= Kruger v Commonwealth =

Judgement of the High Court of Australia

- Court: High Court of Australia
- Full case name: Alec Kruger & Ors v The Commonwealth of Australia; George Ernest Bray & Ors v The Commonwealth of Australia
- Decided: 31 July 1997
- Citations: [1997] HCA 27, (1997) 190 CLR 1.

Court membership
- Judges sitting: Brennan CJ, Dawson, Toohey, Gaudron, McHugh and Gummow JJ

Case opinions
- (4:2) The 1918 Ordinance which purportedly authorised the removal of Aboriginal children, was not invalid as breaching the claimed constitutional rights (per Brennan CJ, Dawson, McHugh & Gummow JJ; Gaudron and Toohey JJ dissenting) (6:0)There is no separate action for a breach of any constitutional right.

In Kruger v Commonwealth, decided in 1997, also known as the Stolen Generation Case, the High Court of Australia rejected a challenge to the validity of legislation applying in the Northern Territory between 1918 and 1957 which authorised the removal of Aboriginal children from their families. The majority of the bench found that the Aboriginals Ordinance 1918 was beneficial in intent and had neither the purpose of genocide nor that of restricting the practice of religion. The High Court unanimously held there was no separate action for a breach of any constitutional right.

== Background ==
Indigenous Australians have lived in the Northern Territory for at least 40,000 years. In 1863 the Territory came under the control of South Australia which in 1910 passed the Northern Territory Aboriginals Act 1910. The Act claimed to be for the "Protection and Control" of the Aboriginal people of the Territory. Under the Act, the "Chief Protector of Aboriginals" was appointed as the legal guardian of every child whose mother was Aboriginal, and had the power to confine such children to a reserve or Aboriginal institution. That is, Indigenous children could be removed by Administrative order, whereas non-Indigenous children at the time could only be removed by order of a Court. This policy of removing Indigenous children from their family continued when control of the Northern Territory was transferred from South Australia to the federal government. The Aboriginals Ordinance 1918 extended these powers, putting Aboriginal females under the total control of the Chief Protector. Most of the Aboriginal institutions were operated by churches. From 1964 indigenous children could only be removed under the same circumstances as non-Indigenous children, however, the conditions of life for Indigenous people put them at greater risk of having their children removed on the ground of neglect or destitution. In 1971 97% of Territory children in foster care were Indigenous.

In 1997 the Human Rights and Equal Opportunity Commission published the Bringing Them Home report on its inquiry into the separation of Aboriginal and Torres Strait Islander children from their families. The report made a range of recommendations, including apologies from governments, churches and charities involved, the payment of monetary compensation and that the federal government legislate to implement the Genocide Convention with full domestic effect.

=== Argument in the High Court ===
The plaintiffs were seeking compensation from the Commonwealth for wrongful imprisonment and deprivation of liberty. For seven of the plaintiffs, Alec Kruger, Hilda Muir, Connie Cole, Peter Hansen, Kim Hill, George Ernest Bray, Janet Zita Wallace and Marjorie Foster, the claim was based on their removal from their families while they were children between 1925 and 1944. The claim of the eighth plaintiff, Rosie Napangardi McClary, was based on her being a mother whose daughter had been removed. One of the barriers for members of the Stolen Generations obtaining compensation was that their removal was authorised by the 1918 Ordinance, a barrier the plaintiffs sought to remove by challenging the legality of the ordinance.

In the High Court the plaintiffs argued that the ordinance was invalid because it

1. infringed the doctrine of separation of powers;
2. offended the common law doctrine of legal equality;
3. restricted their freedom of movement and association;
4. the removal of children constituted genocide; and
5. Removal prevented children from the free exercise of their religion.

== Decision ==
=== Separation of power ===
The plaintiffs argument involved two propositions, that judicial power could only be exercised by a Chapter III Court, and that the removal and detention of people was exclusively a judicial power. That the federal judicial power could only be exercised by a court followed the 1915 decision of the High Court in New South Wales v Commonwealth (The Wheat Case), that the structure of the Constitution required the strict insulation of judicial power such that only a court established under Chapter III of the constitution can exercise the judicial power of the Commonwealth. The reasoning in the Wheat Case was taken further in Waterside Workers' Federation of Australia v J W Alexander Ltd where a majority of judges, Griffith CJ, Barton, Isaacs, Powers and Rich JJ, held that the power to enforce awards, being convictions for offences and the imposition of penalties and punishments, were matters appertaining exclusively to judicial power. The High Court reinforced the doctrine in the Boilermakers' Case, holding that only a Chapter III Court could exercise judicial powers and that a Chapter III Court was only permitted to exercise judicial power. It had previously been held however that the territories were not a part of that federal judicial power.

Authority for the second proposition came from Chu Kheng Lim v Minister for Immigration, where Brennan CJ, Deane and Dawson JJ said "The involuntary detention of a citizen in custody by the State is penal or punitive in character and, under our system of government, exists only as an incident of the exclusively judicial function of adjudging and punishing criminal guilt.

All judges dismissed the separation of powers argument, their reasons differed. Brennan CJ, Dawson and McHugh JJ held that the separation of powers doctrine did not apply to the power to make laws for a territory under section 122 of the Constitution and thus did not decide whether detention was a judicial power. Brennan CJ held that the territories were not part of the federal system that involved the distribution of powers between the Commonwealth and the States. Dawson J, McHugh J agreeing, held that section 122 of the Constitution permitted the Parliament to create courts that were not federal courts and not exercising federal jurisdiction. Dawson J doubted that the actions were of a judicial rather than an executive character.

Toohey, Gaudron and Gummow JJ held that the removal of Indigenous children was not the exercise of judicial power and did not decide whether the separation of powers doctrine applied. Toohey J held that the proposition that the separation of powers doctrine extended to the territories was very persuasive, however his Honour did not determine the question on that basis because "judged by the values and standards prevailing at the time" the Ordinance had a welfare purpose and thus were neither puniative nor the exercise of judicial power. Gaudron J similarly based her decision on the finding that the power to authorise detention in custody was not exclusively judicial power. Gummow J held that at the time the detention was seen as necessary for a legitimate non-punitive purpose and was not the exercise of judicial power.

=== Implied right of legal equality ===
The plaintiffs sought remedies consistent with the dissenting judgements of Deane and Toohey JJ, and Gaudron J in a separate judgment in Leeth v Commonwealth, However, in this case only Toohey J held there was a right of substantive equality; Gaudron J departed from her position in Leeth to support procedural equality only. Gaudron J was accompanied by Dawson, McHugh and Gummow JJ. Brennan CJ did not consider this issue, as he found that such a right could not apply to the territories, as they were creations of parliament.

Per Dawson J, the due process afforded by the existence of Chapter III courts is of a "procedural rather than substantive nature". As for the existence of discrimination in the Constitution, he disagreed with the notion that because there were provisions protecting the States from discriminatory Commonwealth laws, there should be applicable laws for individuals, on the basis that these protections were founded on different considerations. Furthermore, where the Constitution has prescribed equality, it has done so explicitly, such as the section 92 prohibition against discrimination of a protectionist kind. However, he recognised that Deane and Toohey JJ based their doctrine of equality on "considerations of a more fundamental kind".

Dawson J also attacked the notion that legal equality might arise from the Constitution as a free agreement of the people; he noted that there was a degree of equality lacking, with regards to women and Aboriginals. In relation to the common law, even if there were a common law right of substantive equality, the Commonwealth parliament has the ability to usurp the common law otherwise its concurrent power will be less than that of the States. Finally, even with the existence of Chapter III courts, it is not possible to declare a law invalid because it is substantively unequal.

=== Freedom of movement and association ===
The claim for freedom of movement was not based on the express right such as the freedom of interstate commercial travel, but rather an implied right flowing from the implied freedom of political communication, a freedom that may be subject to limitations that are reasonably appropriate and adapted to serve a legitimate end. Toohey, Gaudron, and McHugh JJ held that association and movement were inherent in political communication such that there was an implied freedom of movement and association. Toohey J held that considering the standards and perceptions prevailing at the time of the 1918 Ordinance, it was not necessarily invalid. McHugh J held that the right was intimately connected with voting, and because the people of the Northern Territory, whether indigenous or not, could not vote at that time, freedom of movement did not apply to people in the Northern Territory. Gaudron J was the only judge to have held that any part of the 1918 Ordinance was invalid, holding that sections 6, 16 and 67(1)(c) were invalid as they were not necessary for the attainment of some overriding purpose. These were the sections that permitted the Chief Protector to take children into custody, and to confine them to a reserve or Aboriginal institution.

Brennan CJ and Dawson J did not decide whether or not there was an implied freedom of movement and association. Brennan CJ held that the provisions were not directed to impeding political communication and so were not invalid. Dawson J held that because people in a Territory did not have the right to vote, there was no right for freedom of movement to attach to. Gummow J took the narrowest interpretation, holding that there was not a right to freedom of movement and familial association, and even if such rights existed, the 1918 Ordinance did not infringe them.

=== Freedom from genocide ===
The Bringing Them Home report had found that the removal of Indigenous children was genocide, as defined in the Genocide Convention which was ratified by Australia in 1949, but has not been implemented with legislation in Australia. Article 2 of the Genocide Convention defines genocide as acts committed with intent to destroy a national, ethnical, racial or religious group, including:

(d) Imposing measures intended to prevent births within the group; (e) Forcibly transferring children of the group to another group.

A majority of the High Court, Brennan CJ, Dawson, Toohey, Gaudron and McHugh JJ, found that the 1918 Ordinance required action to be taken in the best interests of the Aboriginal people and thus did not authorise genocide. Thus is, if genocidal acts occurred, they were beyond the power given by the 1918 Ordinance. Gaudron J went further and held that genocide was so fundamentally abhorrent that the Australian Parliament did not have the Constitutional power to make laws authorising acts of genocide. Her Honour was however the only judge to find a right to freedom from genocide.

Dawson J, in addition to holding that the 1918 Ordinance did not authorise genocide, held that section 122 of the Constitution is 'unlimited in terms of subject matter' in contrast to the heads of power under section 51. Therefore the proper construction of the section contains no restriction on legislative power, as the plaintiff argued. Gummow J agreed with this expansive interpretation of section 122.

=== Freedom of Religion ===
Section 116 of the Constitution states:

The Commonwealth shall not make any law for establishing any religion, or for imposing any religious observance, or for prohibiting the free exercise of any religion, and no religious test shall be required as a qualification for any office or public trust under the Commonwealth.

The plaintiffs did not argue that making Aboriginal children attend a church run institution was the imposition of religious observance, but that the system of spiritual beliefs and practices of the Aboriginal people was a religion and the laws prohibited Aboriginal children from the free exercise of that religion by separating them from indigenous culture. The Bringing Them Home report had found that Aboriginal children were removed because their Aboriginality was 'a problem' and to prevent the children from acquiring Aboriginal 'habits', culture and traditions. This argument was rejected by the High Court, with the majority, Brennan CJ, Dawson J, Toohey J, and Gummow J, holding section 116 was directed to the purpose of a law and not to the effect of the law, and that the challenged laws did not have the purpose of restricting the practise of religion. held that none of the laws had that prohibited purpose. Gaudron J agreed with the majority that section 116 was directed to the purpose of the legislation, but that the purpose of the 1918 Ordinance could not be determined on the material before the High Court. Gummow J similarly left open the possibility that section 116 prohibited the use of concealed means or circuitous devices, but that would have to be established by evidence before a law could be found to be invalid.

== Aftermath ==
The High Court upheld the validity of the 1918 Ordinance but that removal could only occur if it was considered as being best interests of the Aboriginal child, "judged by the values and standards prevailing at the time". In this way the Court left open the possibility that the removal of some Aboriginal children may not have been authorised by the 1918 Ordinance. Only one member of the Stolen Generations, Bruce Trevorrow in South Australia, has obtained compensation as a result of litigation. Limited compensation schemes have been implemented in New South Wales and South Australia.

== See also ==
- Australian constitutional law
- Stolen Generations
