= Separation of powers in Australia =

Governmental principle

The separation of powers in Australia is the division of the institutions of the Australian government into legislative, executive and judicial branches. This concept is where the legislature makes the laws, the executive puts the laws into operation, and the judiciary interprets the laws; all independently of each other. The term, and its occurrence in Australia, is due to the text and structure of the Australian Constitution, which derives its influences from democratic concepts embedded in the Westminster system, the doctrine of "responsible government" and the United States version of the separation of powers. However, due to the conventions of the Westminster system, a strict separation of powers is not always evident in the Australian political system, with little separation between the executive and the legislature, with the executive required to be drawn from, and maintain the confidence of, the legislature; a fusion.

The first three chapters of the Australian Constitution are headed respectively "The Parliament", "The Executive Government", and "The Judicature". Each of these chapters begins with a section by which the relevant "power of the Commonwealth" is "vested" in the appropriate persons or bodies. On the other hand, the Constitution incorporates responsible government, in which the legislature and the executive are effectively united. This incorporation is reflected in sections 44, 62 and 64 of the Constitution.

== Legislature and executive ==
Currently in Australia, there is no constitutional system where there is a complete separation of powers. In the Westminster system, ministers (executive) are required to sit in Parliament (legislative). This is to adhere to the concept of Responsible Government, which is a requirement of section 64 of the Constitution.

The specific requirement for ministers to sit in Parliament established the connection between the executive and the legislative; though any person may be appointed a Minister, their appointment lapses if they do not gain a seat in either house of the Parliament within three months. This provision was necessary in 1901, as the first government was sworn in on 1 January but the first parliament was not elected until late March (see 1901 Australian federal election). However, the provision is still relevant, such as the appointment of Bob Carr as Foreign Minister in 2012 prior to his appointment to the Senate. It also applies when a minister in the House of Representatives loses their seat at a general election; despite no longer being a member of parliament, the Minister will typically retain their portfolio for some days after the election, until the new government is sworn in. It also applied when John Gorton became Prime Minister in 1968; he was sworn in while a member of the Senate, then he resigned to contest a by-election for a lower house seat, which he won, but between his resignation from the Senate and being elected to the House of Representatives, he remained Prime Minister without holding any seat in Parliament.

In Victorian Stevedoring & General Contracting Co Pty Ltd v Dignan, the High Court of Australia held that it was impossible, consistent with the British tradition, to insist upon a strict separation between legislative and executive powers. It was found that legislative power may be delegated to the executive, and as a result upheld the validity of delegated legislation. By contrast, in its insistence on a strict separation of "judicial power", the High Court has been less willing to compromise. Furthermore, the role of the courts was discussed in Kable v Director of Public Prosecutions (NSW), whereby a NSW statute was invalidated since it purported to confer non-judicial functions on the court. The principle that a State Court cannot be assigned powers that are incompatible with its constitutionally protected independence was extended to Territory Courts in Ebner v Official Trustee in Bankruptcy (2000).

The legislature can allocate the executive some of its powers, such as the making of regulations under an Act passed by Parliament. Similarly, the legislature could restrict or overrule some powers held by the executive by passing new laws to that effect, though these could be subject to judicial review.

The strong party discipline in Australia, especially in the lower house, has had the effect of weakening scrutiny of the executive by the legislature since, within the lower house, members of the numerically larger party will almost always support the executive and its propositions on all issues.

On the other hand, the Senate has had the effect of restraining the power of the executive through its ability to query, amend and block government legislation. The result of the adoption of a proportional system of voting in 1949 has been that the Senate in recent decades has rarely been controlled by governments. Minor parties have gained greater representation and Senate majorities on votes come from a coalition of groups on a particular issue, usually after debate by the Opposition and Independents.

The Constitution does, moreover, provide for one form of physical separation of executive and legislature. Section 44, concerning the disqualifications applying to membership of Parliament, excludes from Parliament government employees (who hold "an office of profit under the crown" (iv)) along with people in certain contractual arrangements with the Commonwealth. This was demonstrated in 1992 after Independent MP, Phil Cleary, had won the Victorian seat of Wills. Cleary, on leave without pay from the Victorian Education Department at the time of his election, was held in Sykes v Cleary to be holding an office of profit under the Crown and disqualified. The Court noted that Section 44's intention was to separate executive influence from the legislature.

== Judiciary ==
As early as New South Wales v Commonwealth (The Wheat Case), the High Court decided that the strict insulation of judicial power was a fundamental principle of the Constitution. This also applies to tribunals and commissions set up by the Federal Parliament which, unlike some of their equivalents in the states, can only recommend consequences. The Federal Parliament itself has the rarely used privilege of being able to act as a court in some circumstances, primarily where it may regard a non-member as acting "in contempt" of parliament.

The reasoning in the Wheat Case was taken further in Waterside Workers' Federation of Australia v J W Alexander Ltd where a decisive distinction between judicial and arbitral functions was drawn. The High Court made reference to the separation of powers again in R v Kirby; Ex parte Boilermakers' Society of Australia (Boilermakers' Case), highlighting that only a Chapter III Court can exercise judicial powers and, that a Chapter III Court is only permitted to exercise judicial power.

A consequence of the Australian version of the separation of powers is its role in encouraging judicial deference to the "political" arms of government. The normal propensity of the High Court is to recognise that separation of powers requires not only that the "political branches" should not interfere with judicial activity, but also that the judiciary should leave politicians and administrators alone. The importance of deference has been acknowledged in extrajudicial writings, and in decisions such as Drake v Minister for Immigration & Ethnic Affairs (No 2).

As a manifestation of the separation of powers, a 'Chapter III Court' cannot make administrative decisions. In administrative law this means that the courts cannot substitute an original decision of the executive, but can only decide on its correctness.

The doctrine of persona designata permits non-judicial functions to be conferred on judges in their personal capacity, as opposed to their judicial capacity. However, in the Hindmarsh Island Bridge case, it was held that this is subject to the compatibility of the conferred non-judicial function with judicial office.

== Prevalence in States ==
While there are strong textual and structural bases for the independence of the judiciary in the Commonwealth Constitution, the same is not true of the State constitutions. State courts, unlike their federal counterparts, are therefore capable of exercising non-judicial functions. For example, the District Court of South Australia, through its Administrative and Disciplinary Division, conducts merits review of administrative decisions, a function which at Commonwealth level can only be exercised by Executive tribunals. Nevertheless, a degree of judicial independence is maintained at State level by convention.

The federal separation of powers also has implications for State courts, due to the fact that State courts may be invested with federal judicial power under section 71 of the Commonwealth Constitution. On this basis it was held in Kable v Director of Public Prosecutions (NSW) that a State court could not be given a function inconsistent with its status as a potential repository of federal judicial power. The doctrine was rarely applied in the early years following Kable, leading Justice Kirby to describe it as "a constitutional guard-dog that would bark but once." However, there has been a revival in the High Court's application of the doctrine since 2009. One recent case was South Australia v Totani, which involved a challenge to the validity of the Serious and Organised Crime (Control) Act 2008 (SA). Section 14(1) of the Act required members of the Magistrates' Court of South Australia to make control orders on application by the Commissioner of Police, provided only that the Magistrate was satisfied that the person subject to the control order was a member of a declared organisation. Even though the functions of the Magistrates' Court under the Act are purely a matter of South Australian law, the fact that the Court is also capable of exercising federal jurisdiction was held to require that it maintain certain standards of independence and impartiality so that it retains the character of a court.

Parliamentary scrutiny of the executive and, in particular, by the New South Wales Legislative Council, was tested in the 1990s when Treasurer Michael Egan, on behalf of Cabinet, refused to table documents in the Legislative Council of which he was a member. The Council, determined to exercise its scrutiny of the executive, pressed the issues and eventually adjudged the Treasurer in contempt, suspending him from the house twice. The matters were disputed in three cases in the High Court and the Supreme Court of New South Wales. The results upheld the principle that the Legislative Council does have the power to order the production of documents by a member of the House, including a minister, and can counter obstruction. However, the extent of the Legislative Council's power in relation to Cabinet documents remains unclear.

In 2018, the High Court held that all matters falling within section 75, and section 76, of the Constitution formed part of the judicial power of the Commonwealth, including disputes between residents of different States. It followed that the federal separation of powers meant that a State tribunal was unable to determine a dispute between residents of different States.

== Prevalence in Territories ==
One of the bases for the separation of powers in the Constitution is that the powers of the Parliament are found in Chapter I, executive powers are in Chapter II, and judicial powers are in Chapter III. In 1915, it was held that the separation of powers precluded the Inter-State Commission from exercising judicial power, as provided for at section 101, in Chapter IV Finance, and Trade. The power to make laws for the government of the territories is found in section 122, located in Chapter VI New States. How section 122 relates to Chapter III is "a problem of interpretation ... which has vexed judges and commentators since the earliest days of Federation". Three of the six judges in the Stolen Generations case, held that the separation of powers doctrine did not apply to the power to make laws for a territory under section 122 of the Constitution. The High Court later held in 2004 that Australian Parliament can invest federal jurisdiction in a Territory court as well as in a State court. In 2015, the question was again considered by the High Court where Gageler J, and Keane J, held that the power under section 122 was not constrained by the doctrine of separation of powers enshrined in Chapter III of the Constitution. The other members of the Court, French CJ, Kiefel and Bell JJ, and Nettle and Gordon JJ, found it was unnecessary to answer the question.
