= Drake v Minister for Immigration & Ethnic Affairs =

1979 decision of the Federal Court of Australia

- Court: Full Court of the Federal Court
- Decided: 3 May 1979
- Citation: (1979) 46 FLR 409, 24 ALR 577, 2 ALD 60

Case history
- Prior actions: Drake and Minister for Immigration and Ethnic Affairs [1978] AATA 71, (1978) 2 ALD 162
- Appealed from: Administrative Appeals Tribunal
- Subsequent actions: Drake and Minister for Immigration and Ethnic Affairs (No 2) [1979] AATA 179, (1979) 2 ALD 634

Court membership
- Judges sitting: Bowen CJ, Smithers & Deane JJ

Drake v Minister for Immigration & Ethnic Affairs, was a 1979 decision of the Federal Court of Australia dealing with drugs, deportation and judicial roles.

== Background ==
=== Facts ===
Drake was a United States citizen, but had lived in Australia for 10 years. He was convicted of possessing cannabis and was fined $400 and sentenced to 12 months imprisonment, to be released after 3 months on a good behaviour bond. At the time section 12 of the Migration Act 1958, provided that the Minister for Immigration and Ethnic Affairs could order the deportation of a non-citizen who was sentenced to imprisonment for one year or longer. The Minister signed a deportation order.

Drake appealed to the Administrative Appeals Tribunal (AAT).

=== The Administrative Appeals Tribunal ===
The AAT was established in 1975, to conduct an independent merits review of administrative decisions made under Commonwealth laws. The AAT can 'stand in the shoes of the original decision maker' and reconsider the decision using whatever information is brought before it or available to it. The High Court has long held that the separation of judicial power from legislative and executive powers was a fundamental principle of the Constitution. This had the consequence that judicial power could only be exercised by a judge appointed to a court in accordance with section 72 of the Constitution. The High Court also held that the separation of powers meant that a federal court could not validly be given non-judicial powers.

The administrative character of the AAT means that it is not a court and not part of the Australian court hierarchy. The President of the AAT was Gerard Brennan and Daryl Davies was a Deputy President, both of whom were Federal Court judges at the time, appointments referred to as persona designata.

Davies J in the AAT affirmed the Minister's decision.

== Federal Court ==
Drake then appealed to the Federal Court on 4 grounds (1) it was unconstitutional for a federal judge to exercise administrative powers; (2) the section didn't apply to Drake because he had permanent residency (3) Drake wasn't sentenced to imprisonment for one year as he was entitled to be released after 3 months; and (4) the AAT relied too heavily on the policy of the Minister.

=== Judge performing an administrative role ===
The majority, Bowen CJ and Deane J, held that there was nothing in the Constitution that precluded a judge from acting in another role in their personal capacity (i.e. they can hold other positions provided that they are not 'a judge' in those positions). The court held that the role of the AAT was administrative in nature – not judicial – regardless of the fact that the AAT considered questions of law. Smithers J agreed.

=== Construction of the Act ===
The majority held that on the proper construction of the Migration Act section 12 applied to a non-citizen even if they had permanent residency. Further section 12 referred to the period of the sentence, not the term of imprisonment actually served. The dissent of Smithers J was on the basis that the right to be released after 3 months meant that Drake was not in fact sentenced to imprisonment for one year.

=== Ministerial policy ===
Drake argued that the AAT's decision constituted an inflexible use of policy. Smithers J held that the statute provided for the AAT to determine the correct or preferable decision, not merely whether the decision conformed to government policy. While the AAT was entitled to treat government policy as a relevant factor, it was still required to make an independent assessment and independent determination of whether the decision was the correct or preferable one. The majority agreed with the analysis by Smithers J that the AAT had failed to make the independent assessment and determination.

== Subsequent AAT decision ==
The matter was remitted to the AAT to re-hear the matter. In his subsequent decision, Brennan J emphasised the desirability of consistency in decision making before concluding that while the AAT was an independent body and was free to depart from ministerial policy, should generally apply ministerial policy unless the policy was unlawful or “there are cogent reasons to the contrary”. Brennan J affirmed the decision and Drake was deported.
