= Roxborough v Rothmans of Pall Mall Australia Ltd =

- Court: High Court of Australia
- Decided: 6 December 2001
- Citations: [2001] HCA 68, (2001) 208 CLR 516

Case history
- Prior actions: (1999) 161 {ALR 253 Federal Court [1999] FCA 1535, (1999) 95 FCR 185, Federal Court (Full Court)

Court membership
- Judges sitting: McHugh, Gummow, Kirby, Hayne and Callinan JJ

Keywords
- Expense of the claimant

Roxborough v Rothmans of Pall Mall Australia Ltd is an Australian unjust enrichment law case, concerning to what extent enrichment of the defendant must be at the expense of the claimant.

== Facts ==
Mr Roxborough sought to recover a tobacco licence fee from Rothmans Ltd. That was required to be paid by the Business Franchise Licences (Tobacco) Act 1987 (NSW) and was struck down by the High Court of Australia because it was held to be an excise, which only the Federal Government could charge. This left the wholesaler with a windfall, paid to it that were then going to go onto the State government. It had been found that the retailers had already passed on the fees to their customers.

== Judgment ==
The High Court by a majority rejected the defence of passing on. Gleeson CJ, Gaudron J and Hayne J held there was no reason to depart from that view which was expressed in Commissioner of State Revenue (Vic) v Royal Insurance Australia Ltd.

27. ... That, in our view, is the critical question. As between the appellants and the respondent, who has the superior claim? The answer lies in the circumstance that there has been a payment of moneys by the appellants to the respondent for a consideration which has failed, and the respondent has no title to retain the moneys.

Kirby J dissented and held that the defence should be allowed.

115. Must part of the windfall to the wholesaler, who is undeserving, be passed to the retailers, equally undeserving, without any provision, sought or offered, to recompense the consumers, who are deserving because they ultimately paid amounts towards the unrecovered licence fees? Or should the windfall remain where it is, on the footing that no basis is shown by statute, by equity or by the common law to sustain the recovery claimed by the retailers?

[...]

118. In other words, a windfall accruing to a private person would only be disturbed in favour of another private person if the latter could ‘satisfy the court, by the giving of an undertaking or other means, that it will distribute the moneys to the [persons] from whom they were collected, thereby recognizing their beneficial ownership of those moneys. Otherwise, why should the law intervene at all?

143. [If...] demand for recovery is addressed not to a government or government party but to a private corporation the ‘important constitutional value’ of upholding recovery of the unlawful tax from the State is absent... In such a case the fact of ‘passing on’ is certainly relevant. In a given case, it may mean that the taxpayer has, in fact, suffered no loss and is entitled to no legal recovery.

== See also ==
- English unjust enrichment law
