= New South Wales v Commonwealth =

New South Wales v Commonwealth may refer to a number of High Court of Australia cases:

- New South Wales v Commonwealth (1908) 7 CLR 179, Surplus Revenue Case
- New South Wales v Commonwealth (1915) 20 CLR 54, Wheat Case
- New South Wales v Commonwealth (1932) 46 CLR 155, Garnishee Case No 1
- New South Wales v Commonwealth (1975) 135 CLR 337, Seas and Submerged Lands Case
- New South Wales v Commonwealth (1983) 151 CLR 302, Hospital Benefits Fund Case
- New South Wales v Commonwealth (1990) 169 CLR 482, Incorporation Case
- New South Wales v Commonwealth (2006), WorkChoices Case
