= Productivity Commission =

Australian government advisory body

Agency overview
- Formed: 1998
- Preceding agencies: Industry Commission, Bureau of Industry Economics, Economic Planning Advisory Commission
- Type: Statutory agency
- Jurisdiction: Commonwealth of Australia
- Headquarters: Melbourne
- Employees: 179
- Annual budget: A$41,736,000
- Minister responsible: Jim Chalmers, Treasurer
- Agency executives: Danielle Wood, Chair; Lisa Studdert, Head of Office
- Parent department: Treasury
- Key document: Productivity Commission Act 1998
- Website: pc.gov.au

The Productivity Commission is the Australian Government's principal review and advisory body on microeconomic policy, regulation and a range of other social and environmental issues.

The Commission was created as an independent authority by the Productivity Commission Act 1998, an Act of the Australian Parliament. Its reports often form the basis of government policy. However, it does not administer government programs or exercise executive power and governments are not required to act on its recommendations. In practice, however, many recommendations are accepted.

== History ==
=== Timeline ===
The Productivity Commission's lineage extends back to the Tariff Board, which was established in the 1920s. On 1 January 1974, the Tariff Board became the Industries Assistance Commission; in 1989 it became the Industry Commission.

The Commission was created as an independent authority in April 1998 by the Productivity Commission Act 1998, replacing the Industry Commission, the Bureau of Industry Economics, and the Economic Planning Advisory Commission. These three bodies were amalgamated on an administrative basis in 1996.

The Commission's remit may extend beyond Australia, such as when it worked jointly with the former New Zealand Productivity Commission on a study into Trans-Tasman Economic Relations in 2012 and on a 2019 report on Growing the Digital Economy in Australia and New Zealand.

A documentary titled Opening Australia to the world: celebrating 50 editions of the Trade and Assistance Review was produced in 2024.

=== Predecessor agencies ===
- Productivity Commission (1998)
  - Industry Commission (1990)
    - replaced by the Industries Assistance Commission (1974)
      Tariff Board (1921)
    - Inter-State Commission (1975)
  - Bureau of Industry Economics (1978)
  - Economic Planning Advisory Commission (1983)

== Functions ==
The Productivity Commission operates within the federal government's Treasury portfolio. Its core function involves responding to references from the Treasurer, which can request a commissioned study or a public inquiry. Referrals to the Commission stipulate the length and terms of the project. They may cover any sector of the Australian economy, address a particular industry or cut across industry boundaries, and encompass wider social or environmental issues.

The Commission can initiate its own research. Its reports often form the basis of government policy. However, it does not administer government programs or exercise executive power and governments are not required to act on its recommendations. In practice, however, many recommendations are accepted.

Most projects are specified for a duration of nine or twelve months, although some may be six or fifteen months long. Commission studies and inquiries accept submissions from members of the public, although inquiries are additionally required, under the Act, to undertake formal public consultations. All reports are publicly released.

Before September 2026, the PC undertook inquiries into potential safeguard procedures for Australian industries. Safeguard inquiries are now he responsibility of the Australian Trade Remedies Commission (ATRC).

In addition, the Commission acts as the secretariat to the intergovernmental Review of Government Service Provision, and produces annually the Report on Government Services, in addition to regular reports that contribute to a better understanding of the effectiveness of government services provided to Aboriginal and Torres Strait Islander peoples. The Commission operates as the Australian Government's competitive neutrality complaints mechanism.

== Operation ==
The Commission is headed by a Chair and between 4 and 12 other commissioners, who are appointed for a five-year term on the advice of the Treasurer. Some commissioners are required to have particular skills and experience:

- in applying the principles of ecologically sustainable development and environmental conservation
- in dealing with the social effects of economic adjustment and social welfare service delivery
- acquired in working in Australian industry
- dealing with policies and programs that have an impact on Indigenous persons and dealing with one or more communities of Indigenous persons.

Associate commissioners can be appointed by the Treasurer on a full or part-time basis. Staff are Commonwealth public servants. The average number of employees in the 2021–22 financial year was 179.

The Commission reports formally through the Treasurer to the Australian Parliament, where its inquiry reports are tabled. Final inquiry reports must be tabled in Parliament within 25 sitting days of the government receiving the report.

What makes the Commission unusual among public sector institutions around the world is the combination of three core principles which it embodies:

- Independence — The commission operates under the protection and guidelines of its own legislation. It has an arm's length relationship with the Australian Government. While the government largely determines its work program, it cannot tell the Commission what to say and the Commission's findings and recommendations are based solely on its own analyses and judgments.
- Transparency — The commission's advice to government, and the information and analysis on which it is based, are open to public scrutiny. Its processes provide for extensive public input and feedback through hearings, workshops and other consultative forums, and through the release of draft reports and preliminary findings.
- A community-wide focus — The Commission is obliged under its statutory guidelines to take a broad view, encompassing the interests of the economy and community as a whole, rather than only particular industries or groups. Environmental, regional and social dimensions of its work are also considered, informed by public consultation and the Commission's own research capability.

== Appointments ==
=== Chairs ===
Name	Dates
Gary Banks AO	17 April 1998 – 31 December 2012
Peter Harris AO	11 March 2013 – 10 September 2018
Michael Brennan	11 September 2018 – 10 September 2023
Danielle Wood	13 November 2023 – 12 November 2028

=== Deputy Chairs ===
Name	Dates
Richard Snape	24 February 1999 – 4 October 2002
Mike Woods	8 October 2008 – 22 December 2014
Patricia Scott	24 February 2015 – 8 April 2016
Karen Chester	9 April 2016 – 27 January 2019
Alex Robson	28 March 2022 – 27 March 2027

=== Commissioners ===
Name	Dates
John Cosgrove	17 April 1998 – 7 May 2002
Helen Owens	17 April 1998 – 14 April 2006
Richard Snape	17 April 1998 – 4 October 2002
Judith Sloan	17 April 1998 – 16 April 2010
Mike Woods	17 April 1998 – 22 December 2014
Neil Byron	15 July 1998 – 16 April 2010
David Robertson	13 December 2000 – 12 December 2003
Tony Hinton	27 March 2002 – 26 March 2007
Robert Fitzgerald	27 January 2004 – 26 April 2019
Philip Weickhardt	1 January 2004 – 11 December 2014
Gary Potts	17 April 2006 – 30 April 2008
Steven Kates	17 April 2006 – 16 April 2009
Angela MacRae	19 March 2007 – 9 December 2020
Matthew Butlin	1 May 2008 – 30 September 2008
Louise Sylvan	1 August 2008 – 20 September 2011
Wendy Craik	4 June 2009 – 31 December 2014
David Kalisch	4 June 2009 – 10 December 2010
Siobhan McKenna	4 June 2009 – 3 June 2014
Patricia Scott	7 September 2009 – 8 April 2016
Alison McClelland	8 December 2010 – 31 March 2016
Warren Mundy	8 December 2010 – 7 December 2015
Jonathan Coppel	28 July 2011 – 27 July 2021
Karen Chester	12 December 2013 – 27 January 2019
Melinda Cilento	27 November 2014 – 25 August 2017
Paul Lindwall	1 July 2014 – 31 December 2022
Ken Baxter	30 April 2015 – 31 December 2020
Julie Abramson	10 December 2015 – 9 December 2025
Stephen King	1 July 2016 – 31 December 2026
Richard Spencer	27 October 2016 – 28 January 2022
Jane Doolan	8 December 2016 – 7 March 2022
Romlie Mokak	25 March 2019 – 24 March 2024
Malcolm Roberts	1 May 2019 – 10 November 2023
Elizabeth Gropp	1 May 2019 – 31 July 2024
Catherine de Fontenay	1 July 2019 – 30 June 2029
Martin Stokie	1 April 2022 – 31 March 2027
Joanne Chong	1 April 2022 – 31 March 2027
Natalie Siegel-Brown	18 April 2022 – 13 January 2025
Barry Sterland	25 June 2024 – 24 June 2029
Alison Roberts	25 June 2024 – 24 June 2029
Selwyn Button	25 June 2024 – 24 June 2029
Angela Jackson	28 April 2025 – 27 April 2030

== See also ==
- List of Australian Government entities
