= Re Wakim; Ex parte McNally =

- Court: High Court of Australia
- Full case name: Re Wakim; Ex parte McNally & Anor; Re Wakim; Ex parte Darvall; Re Brown & Ors; Ex parte Amann & Anor; Spinks & Ors v Prentice
- Decided: 17 June 1999
- Citations: [1999] HCA 27, (1999) 198 CLR 511; (1999) 163 ALR 270

Court membership
- Judges sitting: Gleeson CJ, Gaudron, McHugh, Gummow, Kirby, Hayne & Callinan JJ

Case opinions
- (5:1) The Commonwealth can only confer such jurisdiction on a federal court as allowed for by ss 75 & 76 of the Constitution and the States cannot confer jurisdiction on federal courts. (per Gummow & Hayne JJ; Gleeson CJ & Gaudron J agreeing; McHugh J & Callinan J concurring separately; Kirby J dissenting)

Re Wakim; Ex parte McNally was a significant case decided in the High Court of Australia on 17 June 1999. The case concerned the constitutional validity of cross-vesting of jurisdiction, in particular, the vesting of state companies law jurisdiction in the Federal Court.

== Background ==
As part of the national corporations law scheme instigated after the High Court's ruling in New South Wales v The Commonwealth (1990) the states were required to legislate for the formation of corporations. As a result of this the states had to vest the Federal Court with state jurisdiction to allow the Commonwealth to have effective judicial control over corporations law.

== The proceedings ==
Four sets of proceedings were initiated in the High Court by different parties. Due to the similarity of the issues involved, all were heard and decided simultaneously.

The first two proceedings were launched by respondents in Federal Court proceedings who were allegedly liable for damages in negligence. They had issued writs of prohibition against the Federal Court.

The third proceeding involved writs of certiorari and prohibition against the Federal Court. One of the orders sought to be quashed was an order for the winding up of a company. The prosecutors sought to prevent the Federal Court from enforcing this order.

The final proceeding involved an application for special leave to appeal the decision of the Full Federal Court affirming orders for the issue of summonses under the corporations law of the Australian Capital Territory.

== Arguments ==
There were two principal arguments in favour of the validity of the legislation:

- that any deficiency in the power of either the states or the Commonwealth to enact a cross-vesting scheme was made good by both the states and the Commonwealth legislating to give effect to the scheme; and
- that the Commonwealth has power to consent to the conferring of jurisdiction by the states on courts created by the Commonwealth parliament.

== The decision ==
The leading judgement on the main issue of cross-vesting of jurisdiction was written by Gummow and Hayne JJ. In relation to the first argument advanced in favour of the validity of the legislation it was held that no amount of Commonwealth-state co-operation could supply a power that did not exist. Their Honours considered that such a situation would simply allow legislative amendment of the Constitution.

The second argument was advanced on the basis that the Commonwealth, as the national polity, could do what was necessary "to protect its own existence and the unhindered play of its legitimate activities". Their Honours also rejected this argument on the basis that convenience or desirability was not a valid criterion of constitutional validity.

Ultimately, it was held that the jurisdiction that may be conferred on a federal court was prescribed by, and limited to, the heads of power contained in ss 75 and 76 of the Constitution and that no other polity could confer jurisdiction on federal courts.

== Consequences ==
The ramifications of the court's decision were immediately apparent. It had raised the possibility that every decision made by a federal court exercising state jurisdiction was invalid. Although the states and the Commonwealth quickly moved to legislate to allow for the affirmation of federal decisions by the state supreme courts, the decision had represented a significant blow to the national corporations law scheme. Subsequent decisions in Bond v The Queen and R v Hughes would eventually see the effective downfall of the scheme and lead to the Corporations Act 2001 (Cth).

== See also ==
- List of High Court of Australia Cases
