= Dunne v Donohoe =

Irish supreme court case

- Coat of arms of Ireland
- Court: Supreme Court of Ireland
- Decided: 1 May 2002
- Citation: Dunne v Donohoe [2002] IESC 35, [2002] 2 IR 533

Court membership
- Judges sitting: Keane CJ, Murphy J, McGuiness J

Case opinions
- Directive 53/00 regarding possession and security arrangements of firearms, with Ireland, was quashed by Supreme Court as it did not comply with the role of Garda Superintendent as Persona Designata and would cause the Garda Superintendent to act ultra vires.

Keywords
- Constitution of Ireland | Ultra Vires | Persona designata | Garda Siochana

Dunne v Donohoe [2002] IESC 35, [2002] 2 IR 533 was an Irish Supreme Court Case wherein the court held that a Garda Superintendent was a persona designata and that a guideline issued the Garda Commissioner that imposed fixed preconditions (in this case, the use of a locked firearms cabinet) to applications for a firearm certificate would result in the superintendent acting Ultra Vires. By ruling that the guideline interfered with the status of a superintendent as a persona designata, the Court provided an important finding in establishing the limits of discretionary powers under the Irish constitution and the legal standing of guidelines issued under the auspices of a national body.

== Background ==
The possession and use of firearms is regulated by a number of statutes, namely the Firearms Acts of 1925 and 1964. The 1925 Act prohibits the possession or use of firearms except where a certificate granted under the provisions of the Act by the Superintendent of the Garda Síochána of the district in which that person resides.

This case regards a directive entitled "Security Arrangements for Licensed Firearms" (Directive 53/00) issued by the second named respondent, an assistant commissioner of the Garda Siochana. This directive required certain security requirements to be in place before certificates were issued; in particular, when the firearm is not in use, it must be kept in a properly constructed firearms cabinet, for which the key must be separately stored.

== Facts of the case ==
The applicants were involved in a voluntary organization involved in, inter alia, game shooting. The applicants challenged the legal validity of the requirements, as established in Directive 53/00, following the first respondent being refused a firearms certificate.

== Lower courts ==
The applicants were granted leave by the High Court to institute proceedings by way of judicial review. O Caoimh J held that the applicants were entitled to orders of certiorari and therefore, quashing Directive 53/00 and the refusal to grant a firearm certification to the first applicant.

The High Court granted the reliefs sought based on two grounds:

"1. The directive was void.. as it had the effect of fettering the discretion of a superintendent in the exercise of the relevant functions under the 1925 Act; 2. That a superintendent was no empowered to impose a fixed precondition requiring every applicant for a firearm certificate to keep the firearms in a locked firearms cabinet constructed in accordance with the requirements of the directive."

The respondents appealed the Supreme Court.

== Appellant's arguments ==
The appellants submitted that the control of firearms was a policing matter and due to the fact that statute regulated such power, did not make their control any less. The appellants also argued that because a licensing function had been conferred on Garda Superintendents, as persona designata, that power could be exercised at absolute discretion. It was also submitted that the Firearms Acts had the intention of local level senior officers granting firearm certificates. Finally, it was submitted that; it was not logical that the Oireachtas would remove, from the Commissioner, any power to ensure minimum acceptable standards of public safety; such a structure would be inconsistent with the purpose of the police force.

== Opinion of the Supreme Court ==
Ultimately, the court held that Directive 53/00 interfered with the persona designata status of the Garda Superintendent, which couldn't be inferred on another. Furthermore, it was held that the Superintendent, in imposing such a condition was acting ultra vires, as there was no requirement for secure storage in the legislation.

Keane CJ, in his judgement, held that the High Court was correct in holding that Superintendent's power, as conferred on them by section 2 of the 1925 Act, was, in fact, granted to the Superintendent as a persona designata, and therefore, such power could not be abdicated to anyone else. Furthermore, he may not be required to exercise it by another body or authority.

This decision was supported by the cases of McLoughlin and Rajan.

Since the Supreme Court was satisfied that the High Court judge had not erred in law in the first ground, it was not necessary to investigate the second. Nevertheless, the court stated that such an act, as set out as the second ground, would constitute the Garda Superintendent, acting ultra vires of the provisions of the 1925 and 1964 Firearm Acts.

The Supreme Court dismissed the appeal and affirmed the order of the High Court.

== Subsequent developments ==
In McCarron v Superintendent Kearney, [2008] IEHC 195, Charleton J., commented that Dunne made the task of "reasonable administration" more difficult for the Garda Siochana.
