= Australia Act 1986 =

Legislation by the Australian and UK parliaments

Parliament of Australia
- Long title: An Act to bring constitutional arrangements affecting the Commonwealth and the States into conformity with the status of the Commonwealth of Australia as a sovereign, independent and federal nation
- Citation: Australia Act 1986 (Cth) No. 142 of 1985
- Enacted by: Parliament of Australia
- Royal assent: 4 December 1985
- Commenced: 3 March 1986
- Status: Current legislation

Australia Act 1986 (Note: Section 17(1).)
- Act of Parliament
- Parliament of the United Kingdom
- Long title: An Act to give effect to a request by the Parliament and Government of the Commonwealth of Australia
- Citation: 1986 c. 2
- Territorial extent: United Kingdom

Dates
- Royal assent: 17 February 1986
- Commencement: 3 March 1986 (5am GMT) (Note: Section 17(2). The Australia Act 1986 (Commencement) Order 1986 (SI 1986/319).)
Other legislation
Amends	Statute of Westminster 1931
Amended by	Merchant Shipping Act 1995

Status: Amended

Text of statute as originally enacted

Revised text of statute as amended

Text of the Australia Act 1986 as in force today (including any amendments) within the United Kingdom, from legislation.gov.uk.

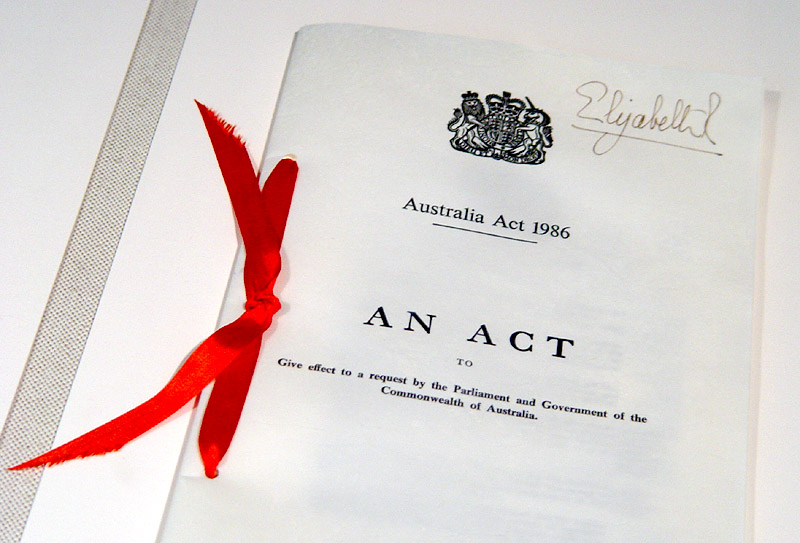
Photo of the Australia Act 1986 (United Kingdom) document located in Parliament House, Canberra

The Australia Act 1986 is the short title of each of a pair of separate but related pieces of legislation: one an act of the Parliament of Australia, the other an act of the Parliament of the United Kingdom. The acts eliminated the ability for the United Kingdom to legislate with effect in Australia, for the UK to be involved in any Australian government, and for an appeal from any Australian court to a British court. (Note: As of 2020 the Australian version has not been amended; the UK version has been amended only as to an element of UK law, without effect in Australia.) This act formally severed all legal ties between Australia and the United Kingdom.

In Australia they are referred to, respectively, as the Australia Act 1986 (Cth) (Note: "Cth" for "Commonwealth [of Australia]") and the Australia Act 1986 (UK). These nearly identical acts were passed by the two parliaments, because of uncertainty as to whether the Commonwealth Parliament alone had the ultimate authority to do so. They were enacted using legislative powers conferred by enabling acts passed by the parliaments of every Australian state. The acts came into effect simultaneously, on 3 March 1986.

At the time, the Commonwealth, state and UK acts were known as the "Australia Acts". However, in discussions of contemporary law (as opposed to legal history), the state acts have performed their function, and thus the expression "Australia Act(s)" refers only to the Commonwealth and UK acts.

== Background ==
The Commonwealth of Australia was formed in 1901 by the federation of six British colonies, each of which became a state. The Constitution of Australia provided for a Commonwealth Parliament, with legislative power on a range of specified topics. The constitution was (and still is) contained in a British statute. (Note: Commonwealth of Australia Constitution Act 1900, suffixed in Australia with "(UK)", or "(Imp)" for "Imperial [Parliament]".)

The United Kingdom Parliament retained some ultimate legislative power in relation to Australia. The UK Parliament's power to legislate with effect for the Commonwealth itself was mostly ended with the Statute of Westminster 1931, when adopted by Australia in 1942 retroactive to 1939. (Note: The adoption was backdated to the outbreak of World War II in 1939.) The statute provided (s 4) that no future UK act would apply to a dominion (of which Australia was one) as part of its law unless the act expressly declared that the dominion had requested and consented to it. Until then, Australia had legally been a self-governing dominion of the British Empire, but with the adoption of the statute became a (mostly) sovereign state.

However, section 4 of the statute only affected UK laws that were to apply as part of Australian Commonwealth law, not UK laws that were to apply as part of the law of any Australian state. Thus, the Parliament of the United Kingdom still had the power to legislate for the states. In practice, however, this power was almost never exercised. For example, in a referendum on secession in Western Australia in April 1933, 68% of voters favoured seceding from Australia and becoming a separate dominion. The state government sent a delegation to Westminster to request that this result be enacted into law, but the British government refused to intervene on the grounds that this was a matter for the Australian government. As a result of this decision in London, no action was taken in Canberra or Perth.

The UK government maintained certain powers over the states until the passage of the acts. For instance, in 1958 the UK vetoed the appointment of then Tasmania premier Robert Cosgrove to be governor, in 1976 UK vetoed the Queensland government's advice to extend Colin Hannah's term as Queensland governor, and in 1979 the British foreign secretary advised the New South Wales government that he would advise the Queen to not assent to two bills that he considered to be unconstitutional. In most of these instances exercised by the UK government, they were in relation to the appointments of state governors, which was a power reserved by the monarch (Queen Elizabeth II at the time). However, the advice to the monarch had been made by UK ministers rather than the relevant state premier.

In addition to the above, the states had other residual constitutional links due to their residual colonial status. These included:

- the Colonial Laws Validity Act 1865 and the "repugnancy" rule, which meant that any state legislation inconsistent with United Kingdom laws extending to the state would be invalid
- limitations on state powers to regulate merchant shipping due to Merchant Shipping Act 1894, which require the monarch's approval

In the 1980s, Canada, Australia, and New Zealand all began the process of severing their last constitutional links to the United Kingdom. Canada began by patriating its constitution in the Constitution Act, 1982, which was enacted by the British Parliament in the Canada Act 1982. New Zealand experienced a constitutional crisis in 1984, leading to a review of New Zealand's constitution. Australia was experiencing the same desire for constitutional modernisation.

=== Appeals to the Judicial Committee of the Privy Council ===
At federation in 1901, the supreme court of each colony became the supreme court of that state. In 1903, a High Court of Australia was established, one of whose functions was to hear appeals from the state supreme courts. The draft of the Constitution, that was put to voters in the various colonies and presented to the British government for embodiment in UK legislation, was that there was to be no appeal from the High Court to the Judicial Committee of the Privy Council in any matter involving the interpretation of the Constitution or of the constitution of a state, unless it involved the interests of some other dominion. (Note: For example the Australasian Federation Enabling Act 1899 No 2 (NSW).) However, the British insisted on a compromise. Section 74 of the Constitution as enacted by the Imperial Parliament provided two possibilities of appeal. There could be an appeal if the High Court issued a certificate that it was appropriate for the Privy Council to determine an inter se matter, i.e. a matter that concerned the constitutional relations between the Commonwealth and one or more states or between two or more states. Furthermore, there could be an appeal with permission of the Privy Council. The Commonwealth Parliament was empowered to legislate to limit the latter path and it did so in 1968 and 1975; but legislation could only limit, not abolish.

Predictably, the High Court proved reluctant to grant certificates for appeal to the Privy Council. The discretion was exercised only once, in 1912. In 1961, delivering on behalf of the whole Court a brief dismissal of an application for a certificate, Chief Justice Sir Owen Dixon said: "experience shows – and that experience was anticipated when s. 74 was enacted – that it is only those who dwell under a Federal Constitution who can become adequately qualified to interpret and apply its provisions". In 1985, the High Court unanimously observed that the power to grant such a certificate "has long since been spent" and is "obsolete".

Although the path of appeal from the High Court to the Privy Council had been effectively blocked, the High Court could not block appeals from state supreme courts directly to the Privy Council. Nor did the Constitution limit, or provide for legislation to limit, such appeals. The expense of any appeal to the Privy Council in London had been a deterrent: in any year, there had never been more than a handful. Nonetheless, by the 1980s the possibility of appeal from a state supreme court was seen as outdated. In addition, in 1978 confusion over the relative precedential value of High Court and Privy Council decisions had been introduced when the High Court ruled that it would no longer be bound by Privy Council decisions.

=== Australian and British legislation ===
Disagreement existed as to whether the Commonwealth Parliament alone had sufficient authority to enact the Australia Act under section 51(xxxviii) of the Constitution, or whether an additional act of the UK Parliament would be required. To put the legal status of the Australia Act beyond doubt, the Australian and British parliaments would each enact the Australia act in substantially similar forms.

The plan to revamp both federal and state constitutional arrangements required each state parliament to pass its own enabling legislation. The long title of these state acts (such as the Australia Acts (Request) Act 1985 of New South Wales) was "An Act to enable the constitutional arrangements affecting the Commonwealth and the states to be brought into conformity with the status of the Commonwealth of Australia as a sovereign, independent and federal nation". The body of each state act set out the state's "request and consent" as to both the Australian and the UK versions of the Australia Act.

The Governor-General of Australia, Sir Ninian Stephen, assented to the Australia Act (Cth) "In the name of Her Majesty" on 4 December 1985. However, Queen Elizabeth II was to visit Australia early in 1986 and, in acknowledgement of Australian sensibilities, it was arranged that she would assent to both versions of the act and then proclaim them so that they would come into force at the same moment in both countries. She assented to the Australia Act 1986 (UK) on 17 February 1986 and on 24 February proclaimed that it would come into force at 05:00 Greenwich Mean Time (Coordinated Universal Time) on 3 March. Then, visiting Australia, at a ceremony held in Government House, Canberra, on 2 March 1986 the Queen signed a proclamation that the Australia Act (Cth) would come into force at 05:00 GMT on 3 March. Thus, according to both UK law and Australian law, the two versions of the Australia Act would commence simultaneously—the UK version at 05:00 GMT in the UK and, according to the time difference, the Australian version at 16:00 AEDT in Canberra. The ceremony was presided over by the Australian prime minister, Bob Hawke, to whom the Queen presented the signed copy of the proclamation, along with the assent original of the UK act.

== The act ==
The Australia Act ended all power of the UK Parliament to legislate with effect in Australia – that is, "as part of the law of" the Commonwealth, a state or a territory (section 1). Conversely, no future law of a state would be void for inconsistency with (being "repugnant to") any UK law applying with "paramount force" in Australia; a state (like the Commonwealth) would have power to repeal or amend such an existing UK law so far as it applied to the state (section 3). State laws would no longer be subject to disallowance and reservation by the monarch (section 8) – a power that, anomalously, remains for Commonwealth legislation (Constitution sections 59 and 60). (Note: The Constitution can only be amended through a national referendum and associated legislation, under Constitution s 128. The referendum process is very difficult; as of 2023, only 8 out of 45 proposals put to referendum have been approved.)

Similarly, the Australia Act removed the power of the British government to be involved in the governing of an Australian state (sections 7 and 10). Specifically, only the state premier could now advise the monarch on appointment or removal of a state governor.

Governors were vested with the ability to exercise all the powers of the monarch (except the power to appoint the governor), which the monarch was barred from exercising unless they were physically present within the state.

=== Amendment or repeal ===
Section 15 of the Australia Act sets out the procedure that the act or the Statute of Westminster 1931 can be amended or repealed as part of the law of the Commonwealth, of a state or of a territory. Mirroring the procedure of Section 51(xxxviii) of the Constitution of Australia that was used to enact the Australia Act 1986 (Cth), any amendment to these two pieces of legislation requires the Commonwealth Parliament to act at the request or concurrence of all the state parliaments. As of 2020, neither the Australia Act nor the Statute of Westminster has been amended in this manner.

=== Appeals ===
Section 74 of the Constitution has not been amended, and the Constitution cannot be amended by legislation alone. Nonetheless, section 11 of the Australia Act goes as far as legislatively possible, to make section 74 a dead letter. Thus, for practical purposes, the Australia Act has eliminated the remaining methods of appeal to the Privy Council. (Note: Appeals were still being lodged up to the last moment. The final such appeal, an equity case from the Court of Appeal of the Supreme Court of New South Wales originating in 1985, was comprehensively dismissed (on the merits, not for lack of jurisdiction) by the Privy Council on 27 July 1987.)

== Legacy ==
The principal difference between the Commonwealth and UK versions of the Australia Act lies in the reference, appearing in the long title and preamble to the Commonwealth version but not present in the UK version, to Australia as "a sovereign, independent and federal nation".

The High Court in Sue v Hill in 1999 did not rely upon the long title or the preamble, which conventionally do not have force of law. But it decided that the effect of the Australia Act 1986 (Cth) was that, at least from the date when the act came into operation, Britain had become a "foreign power" within the meaning of Constitution section 44(i), so that a parliamentary candidate who had British nationality was ineligible to be a member of the Commonwealth Parliament. (Several more cases of British citizenship, as well as citizenship of other countries, in the Commonwealth Parliament came to light in the 2017–18 Australian parliamentary eligibility crisis.)

That view was taken in Sue v Hill by three members of the High Court, supported with misgivings by one other member. One of those who did not find it necessary to express an opinion on this point, Justice Michael Kirby, was in a later case to deliver a dissent in which he argued that section 6 of the Australia Act 1986 (Cth) was invalid. Section 106 of the Constitution guarantees that a state constitution may be altered only in accordance with its own provisions, (Note: This would normally be through a referendum of the people of the state.) hence not by the Commonwealth Parliament. However, both versions of the Australia Act contain amendments to the constitutions of Queensland (section 13) and Western Australia (section 14). In Kirby's view in Marquet (2003), this was inconsistent with section 106 of the Australian Constitution, so that section six of the Australia Act (Cth) was not a valid exercise of Commonwealth legislative power. A majority, however, thought that it was sufficient that the act had been passed in reliance on Constitution s 51(xxxviii), which gives the Commonwealth Parliament power to legislate at the request of the state parliaments.

In Shaw v Minister for Immigration and Multicultural Affairs (2003), the High Court held that the act "gave voice to the completion of Australia's evolutionary independence ... it was a formal declaration that the Commonwealth of Australia and the Australian states were completely constitutionally independent of the United Kingdom".

== See also ==
Comparable acts in ex-Dominions' constitutional law

- Canada Act 1982 and Constitution Act, 1982, Canadian legislation
- Constitution of India
- Constitution of Ireland
- New Zealand Constitution Act 1986
- Pakistan Constitution of 1956
- Sri Lankan Constitution of 1972
- Status of the Union Act, 1934 and South African Constitution of 1961

== Bibliography ==
Primary sources

- "Australia Act 1986 (Cth)". Federal Register of Legislation. 4 December 1985.
- "Australia Act 1986 (UK)". legislation.gov.uk.
- "Australia (Request and Consent) Act 1985 (Cth)". legislation.gov.au. 4 December 1985.
- "Australia Acts (Request) Act 1985 (NSW)". legislation.nsw.gov.au.
- "Australia Acts (Request) Act 1985 (Qld)". legislation.qld.gov.au.
- "Australia Acts (Request) Act 1985 (SA)". legislation.sa.gov.au.
- "Australia Acts (Request) Act 1985 (Tas)". legislation.tas.gov.au.
- "Australia Acts (Request) Act 1985 (Vic)" (PDF). legislation.vic.gov.au.
- "Australia Acts (Request) Act 1985 (WA)". legislation.wa.gov.au.
- "Statute of Westminster Adoption Act 1942". legislation.gov.au. 3 March 1986.
- "Statute of Westminster 1931 (Imp)". legislation.gov.uk.
- "Commonwealth of Australia Constitution Act (The Constitution) (Cth)". legislation.gov.au. 29 July 1977.
- "Commonwealth of Australia Constitution Act 1900 (Imp)". legislation.gov.uk.
- "The Constitution together with Proclamation Declaring the Establishment of the Commonwealth, Letters Patent Relating to the Office of Governor‑General, Statute of Westminster Adoption Act 1942, Australia Act 1986 with Overview, Notes and Index (Cth)". legislation.gov.au.

Secondary sources

- Gilbert, Christopher (1989). "Section 15 of the Australian Acts: Constitutional Change by the Back Door". QUT Law Review. 5: 55–68. doi:10.5204/qutlr.v5i0.313.
- Lee, H P (1988). "The Australia Act 1986 - Some Legal Conundrums". Monash University Law Review. 14: 298–315.
- Lindell, G J (1986). "Why is Australia's Constitution Binding? - The Reason in 1900 and Now, and the Effect of Independence". Federal Law Review. 16: 29–49. doi:10.1177/0067205X8601600102. S2CID 159157171.
- "Sovereignty and independence — Australia — severance of residual links with the United Kingdom — proclamation of the Australia Act 1986". Australian Year Book of International Law. 11: 171–174. 1984–1987.
- Thomson, James (1990). "The Australia Acts 1986: A State Constitution Law Perspective". UWA Law Review. 20: 409–420.
- Twomey, Anne (2006). The Chameleon Crown: The Queen and Her Australian Governors. Annandale: Federation Press. ISBN 978-1-86287-629-3.
- Twomey, Anne (2007). "The De-Colonisation of the Australian States". Sydney Law School Research Paper No. 07/19.
- Twomey, Anne (2008). "The States, the Commonwealth and the Crown—the Battle for Sovereignty". Papers on Parliament. 48.
- Twomey, Anne (2010). The Australia Acts 1986: Australia's Statutes of Independence. Annandale: Federation Press. ISBN 978-1-86287-807-5.
- Twomey, Anne (2012). "The Effect of the Australia Acts on the Western Australian Constitution". University of Western Australia Law Review. 36 (2): 273–296.
- Williams; et al., eds. (2014). Blackshield and Williams, Australian Constitutional Law and Theory (6th ed.). Annandale: Federation Press. pp. 121–125. ISBN 978-1-86287-918-8.
