= Waterside Workers' Federation of Australia v J W Alexander Ltd =

1918 judgement in Australian law

- Court: High Court of Australia
- Decided: 27 September 1918
- Citations: [1918] HCA 56, (1918) 25 CLR 434

Court membership
- Judges sitting: Griffith CJ, Barton, Isaacs, Higgins, Gavan Duffy, Powers and Rich JJ

Case opinions
- (5:2) S 72 of the Constitution required that every Justice of any Court created by the Parliament of the Commonwealth be appointed for life. (per Griffith CJ, Barton, Isaacs, Powers & Rich JJ) (Higgins & Gavan Duffy JJ dissenting)

Waterside Workers' Federation of Australia v J W Alexander Ltd is a landmark Australian judgment of the High Court made in 1918 regarding judicial power of the Commonwealth which established that Chapter III of the Constitution required judges to be appointed for life to a specific court, subject only to the removal provisions in the constitution. The majority of the High Court held that because the President of the Commonwealth Court of Conciliation and Arbitration was appointed for seven years and not life as required by s 72 of the Constitution, the Arbitration Court could not exercise judicial powers of the Commonwealth.

== Background ==
The Waterside Workers' Federation of Australia applied to the Commonwealth Court of Conciliation and Arbitration for a penalty to be imposed on J W Alexander Ltd for the breach of an award. H. B. Higgins was appointed for life as a judge of the High Court, however his appointment as President of the Commonwealth Court of Conciliation and Arbitration was for seven years only. J W Alexander Ltd objected to the case being heard by the Court, arguing that the Court was not validly constituted because the President was not appointed for life.

Higgins referred questions for the opinion of the High Court, by way of a stated case. Two primary issues arose in the case, whether the Commonwealth Court of Conciliation and Arbitration could validly exercise (1) judicial power of the Commonwealth and (2) the arbitration powers of the Commonwealth. In the High Court Owen Dixon represented the Waterside Workers' Federation while Hayden Starke appeared for J W Alexander Ltd.

At the time s 72 of the Constitution provided :

The Justices of the High Court and of the other courts created by the Parliament:

(i) shall be appointed by the Governor-General in Council;

(ii) shall not be removed except by the Governor-General in Council, on an address from both Houses of the Parliament in the same session, praying for such removal on the ground of proved misbehaviour or incapacity;

(iii) shall receive such remuneration as the Parliament may fix; but the remuneration shall not be diminished during their continuance in office.

The case followed shortly after the Wheat Case where the High Court held that the seven year term mandated by s103 of the Constitution for members of the Inter-State Commission precluded that commission from exercising judicial powers of the Commonwealth.

== Decision ==
The High Court was divided with the majority of judges agreeing as to the conclusions but for different reasons such that there was no majority opinion and the ratio decidendi is, in part, uncertain. The plurality opinion is found in the judgments of Isaacs, Powers and Rich JJ.

=== The exercise of judicial power ===
A majority of judges, Griffith CJ, Barton, Isaacs, Powers and Rich JJ, held that the power to enforce awards, being convictions for offences and the imposition of penalties and punishments, are matters appertaining exclusively to judicial power. Because the power conferred by the Commonwealth Conciliation and Arbitration Act 1904-1915 was part of the judicial power of the Commonwealth, the Commonwealth Court of Conciliation and Arbitration could only do so if the Arbitration Act complied with the requirements of a Chapter III court.

Barton, Isaacs, Powers and Rich JJ held that any judge of a Chapter III court must be appointed for life, subject only to the removal powers in section 72(ii). The life appointment must be to the particular court, not just to a court. It followed that the appointment of the President for a term of seven years was contrary to s 72 of the Constitution.

Because the President was invalidly appointed, the Commonwealth Court of Conciliation and Arbitration could not exercise the judicial power of the Commonwealth and the provisions conferring upon it the power to enforce its awards were, therefore, invalid.

Isaacs & Rich JJ in their joint judgement held that the only power the Constitution gave the Governor-General with respect to judges under Chapter III was to appoint or, in limited circumstances, remove the judge from office. The Governor-General had no power to assign judicial duties.

Griffith CJ agreed with the majority that a judge must be appointed for life, however his Honour dissented as to the conclusion, holding at p 448 that being the President of the Commonwealth Court of Conciliation and Arbitration was not a separate judicial office, as it conferred no additional remuneration nor any personal right or advantage. As such the Governor-General was assigning these judicial duties to one of the Justices of the High Court and it was not an appointment under section 72 of the Constitution.

In separate judgments Higgins and Gavan Duffy JJ dissented on the basis that s 72 of the Constitution did not require the appointment of a judge for life and that a person who ceased to be a judge on the expiration of that person's term of office was not removed by the Governor-General.

If the Commonwealth Court of Conciliation and Arbitration could not enforce the award, then who could? Isaacs, Higgins, Powers and Rich JJ held that the award could be enforced in any Magistrates' court exercising summary jurisdiction.

=== The exercise of arbitration powers ===
The majority decision that the provisions conferring judicial power to enforce awards were invalid, raised the issue as to whether the invalidity extended to the provisions that allowed the award to be made. That is whether the invalid conferral of judicial power could be severed from the valid conferral of powers of arbitration. Isaacs, Higgins, Powers and Rich JJ held that these portions could be severed and that the rest of the Act was valid.

Barton J dissented on the basis that the intention of parliament was that the two spheres of power "should coexist in the same tribunal as parts of one whole", such that the Act was wholly beyond the powers of the Parliament and that award was invalid and not enforceable.

Griffith CJ held that the entire Act was valid and so upheld the validity of the award. His Honour however agreed with Barton J that the Act was not severable and that if the enforcement powers were invalid, as found by the majority, then the entire Act was invalid.

== Significance ==
The effect of the decision was to uphold the validity of the award and that it was enforceable, just not in the Commonwealth Court of Conciliation and Arbitration. There was thus no immediate practical need to amend the legislation. Higgins J continued to sit as the president, exercising the arbitral powers until his resignation in 1921. He was replaced as president by Powers J.

It was not until 1926 that the Parliament passed the Commonwealth Conciliation and Arbitration Act 1926, which replaced the president with a chief judge who was appointed in the precise terms of s 72 of the Constitution.

While the case is still quoted in relation to the extent of the judicial power, the main significance of the decision in relation to the powers of the Commonwealth Court of Conciliation and Arbitration was subsumed by the decision in the Boilermakers case in 1956, that no Court could exercise both judicial and arbitral powers.

The case was referred to by the Attorney General in the second reading speech for the proposed referendum to provide for a retirement age for federal judges.

As long ago as 1918, the High Court held in Alexander's case that section 72 requires that every justice of the High Court and every justice of any other court created by the Commonwealth Parliament, and indeed every magistrate so appointed, shall, subject to the power of removal contained in that section, be appointed for life. It has, in consequence, been generally accepted that justices of the High Court, and other Federal judges including magistrates, cannot be required to retire on reaching a specified age. This is an unsatisfactory situation. There is an almost universal practice that the holders of public offices retire on attaining a maximum retirement age. The reasons for this practice are well known and they do not need to be spelt out here.

The subsequent referendum was approved by a majority of electors nationwide, and in a majority of states. The constitution now requires appointment for a term expiring on the judge's age, with the consequence that the interpretation favoured by Higgins and Gavan Duffy JJ, permitting appointment for a fixed term, is not available unless there is a further constitutional amendment.
