= Danielle Wood (economist) =

Australian economist

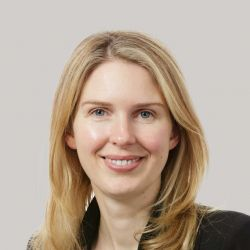

Chair of the Productivity Commission
- Incumbent
- Assumed office 13 November 2023
- Nominated by: Jim Chalmers
- Preceded by: Michael Brennan

Personal details
- Born: 1979 or 1980 (age 46–47)
- Education: University of Adelaide (BEcon Hons); University of Melbourne (MEcon, LL.M.)

Danielle Wood (born 1979 or 1980) is an Australian economist who is as of August 2025 chair of the Productivity Commission. She commenced as chair in November 2023, and is the first woman to hold the role. Before her time as commission chair, she was CEO of the Grattan Institute from 2020 to 2023.

== Early life and education ==
Danielle Wood grew up in the Adelaide Hills, the daughter of Rae and Simon Wood.

She attended Walford Anglican School for Girls in Hyde Park, Adelaide. Walford, however, did not offer economics as a year 12 subject, so she took economics classes at Eynesbury Senior College. She then studied at the University of Adelaide, graduating with a Bachelor of Economics with honours in 2001, before attaining master's degrees in both economics and competition law from the University of Melbourne.

== Career ==
After graduating, Wood began her career as a research economist with the Productivity Commission (PC). She then worked at the Australian Competition and Consumer Commission and NERA Economic Consulting.

In 2014, she joined the Grattan Institute, a public policy think tank based in Melbourne. When the institute's inaugural CEO John Daley retired in July 2020, she succeeded him in the position. Her role helming Grattan made her a prominent and regular economic commentator in the Australian media, with the Australian Financial Review describing her as "one of the most visible and highly regarded economists in the country". She received particular attention for her keynote address to the federal government's Jobs and Skills Summit in September 2022, which focused on efficiency and women's participation in the workforce.

From 2019 to 2022, she was president of the Economic Society of Australia (ESA). She was the first woman to hold the role, which was established in 1925. She also co-founded the Women in Economics Network, which is linked to the ESA.

In September 2023, Treasurer Jim Chalmers announced that Wood would return to the PC, this time as chair. She was appointed after Chris Barrett, whom Chalmers had appointed to the role in July 2023, unexpectedly turned down the position. Barrett’s appointment to the role in July drew some criticism, as he had previously been chief of staff for former Labor treasurer Wayne Swan at a time when Chalmers was working in that office. When she commenced in the role that November, she became the first woman to lead the PC or any of its precursors since their founding over a century before.

Treasurer Jim Chalmers has also appointed Wood as a member of the expert panel that will advise a Competition Taskforce established in Treasury.

== Other activities ==
In May 2024, Wood delivered the Hugh Stretton Oration at the University of Adelaide, on the topic of economic inequality in Australia.

Preceded by Michael Brennan	Chair of the Productivity Commission; From 13 November 2023	Incumbent
