= New South Wales v Commonwealth (1990) =

Australian constitutional law case

- Court: High Court of Australia
- Full case name: New South Wales, South Australia and Western Australia v The Commonwealth of Australia
- Decided: 8 February 1990
- Citations: (1990) 169 CLR 482; [1990] HCA 2; (1990) 90 ALR 335

Court membership
- Judges sitting: Mason CJ, Brennan, Deane, Dawson, Toohey, Gaudron & McHugh JJ

Case opinions
- (6:1) Section 51(xx) of the Constitution does not permit the Commonwealth to make a law for the incorporation of trading or financial corporations nor does it permit the Commonwealth to prohibit the states from making laws with respect to the incorporation of companies. (per Mason CJ, Brennan, Dawson, Toohey, Gaudron & McHugh JJ; Deane J dissenting)

New South Wales v The Commonwealth, the Incorporation Case, was a decision handed down in the High Court of Australia on 8 February 1990 concerning the corporations power in s51(xx) of the Commonwealth Constitution. The states of New South Wales, South Australia and Western Australia brought an application seeking a declaration as to the validity of certain aspects of the Corporations Act 1989 (Cth).

== Background ==
=== History of Section 51(xx) ===
Section 51(xx) of the Constitution provides:

"The Parliament shall, subject to this Constitution, have power to make laws for the peace, order, and good government of the Commonwealth with respect to...

(xx) foreign corporations, and trading or financial corporations formed within the limits of the Commonwealth..."

In an early High Court case, Huddart, Parker & Co Ltd v Moorehead, the corporations power had been construed extremely narrowly, mostly through adherence to the doctrine of reserved state powers which was later abandoned in the Engineers' case. The five justices in Huddart, Parker were of the opinion that the corporations power was confined to companies already in existence and did not extend to their creation.

However, 60 years on, the High Court declined to follow Huddart, Parker in the case of Strickland v Rocla Concrete Pipes Ltd. This was based on the fact that the decision in Huddart, Parker had relied on the now defunct theory of reserved state powers. This decision led to a significant revival in the use of the corporations power.

=== Corporations Law in Australia ===
Corporations law in Australia had historically mirrored developments in English law and was mostly the concern of each separate state legislature. Thus, despite the reliance on the English framework, significant differences emerged between each state's corporations legislation.

After the Second World War it became increasingly clear that these legislative differences were creating unnecessary costs for companies operating nationally. Thus, the states and the Commonwealth co-operated in the formation of uniform national companies legislation which passed in each jurisdiction by 1962. The difficulty with this scheme was that it did not provide for uniformity in amendment of the legislation and with changes of government and policy each state's legislation once again developed on separate lines.

A second co-operative scheme was agreed to in 1978 and implemented by 1982 to overcome the defects in the first system. All laws and amendments would be agreed to by a Ministerial Council and automatically applied in each jurisdiction. This second scheme led the creation of the National Companies and Securities Commission, the forerunner to the present day Australian Securities and Investments Commission.

While an improvement on the first scheme, the 1982 scheme still presented significant difficulties mainly due to the NCSC delegating administrative functions to state commissions but retaining control of takeovers and policy. This led to funding difficulties and inefficient corporate regulation. Thus, the Commonwealth sought to take sole responsibility for corporations law in Australia.

=== Corporations Act 1989 ===
Relying in the main on s51(xx) of the Constitution the Commonwealth enacted the Corporations Act 1989. Concerned with the constitutional validity of the legislation the states of New South Wales, South Australia and Western Australia sought a declaration as to the validity of the aspects of the legislation dealing with the registration and incorporation of companies.

== The decision ==
=== The majority ===
The court split 6:1 in its decision. The majority (Mason CJ, Brennan, Dawson, Toohey, Gaudron & McHugh JJ) wrote a joint judgement in which they affirmed the view in Huddart, Parker that the corporations power was confined to making laws with respect to companies that had commenced trading and could not be interpreted so as to support laws providing for the formation of companies.

The majority placed particular reliance on two arguments. The first being the presence of the past participle adjective "formed" which, in their Honours' opinion, restricted the section to companies which had already been formed. The second argument relied on were the speeches and notes of the Constitutional Convention debates. Successive drafts of the Constitution made it clear that the section was meant to apply to already formed companies. Moreover, the question of giving the Commonwealth the power to legislate for incorporation had been raised and had produced the following response from Sir Samuel Griffith:

"There are a great number of different corporations. For instance, there are municipal, trading and charitable corporations, and these are all incorporated in different ways according to the law obtaining in different states... I think the States may be trusted to stipulate how they will incorporate companies, although we ought to have some general law in regard to their recognition."

=== The minority ===
Deane J wrote a vigorous dissenting judgment in which he said that the words of the constitution itself were authoritative, not the views expressed by the participants at the Constitutional Conventions. Deane J, in opposition to the majority of the court, considered that the wording of s51(xx) could be interpreted so as to give the Commonwealth a general power to incorporate trading and financial corporations.

== Consequences ==
This decision had the practical effect of nullifying the intention of the Corporations Act 1989. However, not to be deterred, the Commonwealth sought the power it wanted through negotiation with the states. This process resulted in each state agreeing to pass identical registration legislation as amended from time to time and accepting the administrative control of ASIC.

To fully achieve the aim of a national scheme the Commonwealth and states entered a cross-vesting of jurisdiction agreement in which the Federal Court was vested with state jurisdiction to hear company law matters. Although this system functioned effectively for several years it was eventually brought to its knees by the High Court in Re Wakim; Ex parte McNally, Bond v The Queen, and R v Hughes, (2000) 171 ALR 155. These decisions precipitated further reform of the national corporation law scheme in 2001.

== See also ==
- List of High Court of Australia cases
- Section 51(xx) of the Australian Constitution
