= Economic Planning Advisory Commission =

Australian government commission

Commission overview
- Formed: 19 June 1983; 43 years ago
- Dissolved: 16 April 1998
- Superseding Commission: Productivity Commission
- Jurisdiction: Federal government of Australia
- Commission executive: Prime Minister Paul Keating, (Chairman) (1994 - 1996)

The Economic Planning Advisory Commission (Economic Planning and Advisory Council until 1994) was a commission formed by the Australian government in 1983 with the goal of investigating medium and long-term economic and social issues, and providing advice to the government on these matters. The council was formed in response to the WA Inc scandal a few years prior. In 1998 with the passing of the Productivity Commission Act 1998 the bureau was merged with the Industry Commission, and the Bureau of Industry Economics to create the Productivity Commission.

Members of the commission included the Australian Council of Social Service and Treasurer Ralph Willis. The commission consisted of eight people.

== Fitzgibbon Report ==
In 1986 Charlie Fitzgibbon, leader of the Waterside Workers' Federation, delivered a report to the commission criticizing the incumbent Hawke government's handling of industrial relations, with particular reference to the Builders Labourers Federation (BLF). His report, titled "International Trade Policy", suggested that the government and industry needed to move quickly to provide an environment more conducive to international trade by reducing the power of "out of control" unions in Australia, and thus the high costs of local companies. He named the BLF as an example of one such union, it was at the time accused of playing companies off each other, and was in danger of deregistration. The Hawke government initially tried to bury the report, however it was eventually released, with the opposition calling for a "trade emergency" over the findings.
