= Bond v The Queen =

Judgement of the High Court of Australia

- Court: High Court of Australia
- Full case name: Bond v The Queen
- Decided: 14 August 1992
- Citations: [2000] HCA 13, (2000) 201CLR 213; 169 ALR 607

Case history
- Prior action: The Queen v Bond (1997) 24 ACSR 518; (1997) 95 A Crim R 246
- Appealed from: WA Court of Criminal Appeal

Court membership
- Judges sitting: Gleeson CJ, Gaudron, McHugh, Gummow, Kirby, Hayne JJ

Case opinions
- (6:0) The authority contained in s17 of the Director of Public Prosecutions Act 1983 (Cth) did not give the Commonwealth DPP the power to institute appeals in state courts. (per curiam) (6:0) The common law principles relating to the validity of acts done by an invalidly appointed public officer had no application. (per curiam)

Bond v The Queen, was a significant case decided in the High Court of Australia regarding the power of the Commonwealth DPP to institute appeals in state courts.

== Background ==
Alan Bond had pleaded guilty in the Supreme Court of Western Australia to two charges of failing to act honestly in his capacity as an officer of a company, with intent to defraud the company and its shareholders. He was sentenced to a total of four years imprisonment. The Director of Public Prosecutions appealed his sentence to the Court of Criminal Appeal, of which the court allowed the appeal and sentenced Alan Bond to seven years imprisonment.

Alan Bond appealed to the High Court on the grounds that the Director of Public Prosecutions did not have the authority to appeal the sentence imposed on him.

== Judgement ==
The appeal was allowed.
