= Inter-State Commission =

Defunct constitutional body in Australia

Commission overview
- Formed: 1912; 1983
- Dissolved: 1920 (de facto); 1950 (de jure); 1990
- Superseding commission: Industry Commission
- Jurisdiction: Commonwealth of Australia
- Commission executive: Various, Chairman
- Key documents: Constitution of Australia; Inter-State Commission Act 1912

The Inter-State Commission, or Interstate Commission, is a defunct constitutional body under Australian law. The envisaged chief functions of the Inter-State Commission were to administer and adjudicate matters relating to interstate trade. The Commission was established in 1912, became dormant in 1920, was abolished in 1950, re-established in 1983, and absorbed into the Industry Commission in 1989.

== Constitutional basis ==
The Constitution of Australia contains the following provisions relating to the envisaged body:

101. There shall be an Inter-State Commission, with such powers of adjudication and administration as the Parliament deems necessary for the execution and maintenance, within the Commonwealth, of the provisions of this Constitution relating to trade and commerce, and of all laws made thereunder.

102. The Parliament may by any law with respect to trade or commerce forbid, as to railways, any preference or discrimination by any State, or by any authority constituted under a State, if such preference or discrimination is undue and unreasonable, or unjust to any State; due regard being had to the financial responsibilities incurred by any State in connexion with the construction and maintenance of its railways. But no preference or discrimination shall, within the meaning of this section, be taken to be undue and unreasonable, or unjust to any State, unless so adjudged by the Inter-State Commission.

103. The members of the Inter-State Commission:

(i) shall be appointed by the Governor-General in Council;
(ii) shall hold office for seven years, but may be removed within that time by the Governor-General in Council, on an address from both Houses of the Parliament in the same session praying for such removal on the ground of proved misbehaviour or incapacity;
(iii) shall receive such remuneration as the Parliament may fix; but such remuneration shall not be diminished during their continuance in office.

104. Nothing in this Constitution shall render unlawful any rate for the carriage of goods upon a railway, the property of a State, if the rate is deemed by the Inter-State Commission to be necessary for the development of the territory of the State, and if the rate applies equally to goods within the State and to goods passing into the State from other States.

Section 73 provides that appeals on questions of law can be made on decisions of the Inter-State Commission to the High Court

== Background in the Constitutional Conventions ==
At the first Constitutional Convention in Sydney in 1891, considerable debate occurred over the issue of freedom in interstate trade, especially over the abuses arising from differential and preferential railway rates being put into effect in New South Wales and Victoria. One delegate remarked that "'Nothing has caused more friction than the practice of imposing differential railway rates and so filching trade from a neighbouring colony ... in fact I know of no other cause of strong feeling between the people of these different communities than that which has arisen from commerce." The later 1897 convention also saw concerns expressed over the effect such predatory rates were having on the river trade, prompting Richard O'Connor to declare that interstate free trade would require institutional, as well as constitutional, (Note: as envisaged in s. 92) protection. The proposal was strongly endorsed by the Convention, and it was later described by Sir John Quick as being a "necessary adjunct to the Constitution". It was seen as being similar in nature to the US Interstate Commerce Commission and the UK Railway and Canal Commission. (Note: as constituted under Part I of the Railway and Canal Traffic Act 1888 (51&52 Vict, c. 25))

== History ==
=== Delay in creation (1901–1912) ===
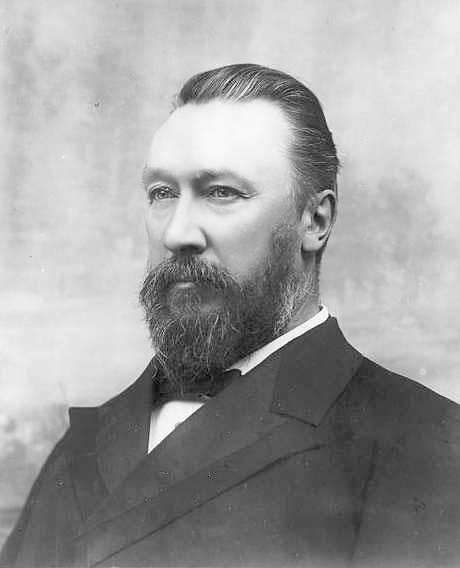
William Lyne, promoter of the Commission's creation

While William Lyne, in his role as the first Minister for Home Affairs, had been working on a draft Bill as early as January 1901 to establish the Commission, fiscal pressures brought on by the Braddon Clause (Note: named after Sir Edward Braddon, Premier of Tasmania in the late 1890s, it referred to s. 87 of the Constitution of Australia, which provided for 75% of all receipts arising from customs and excise duties during the first ten years would be remitted to the States) discouraged efforts to assure its passage before 1911, as its establishment was viewed to be a luxury. Lobbying efforts by the Australian shipping industry, incensed that the Commission's scope would include ocean navigation, also contributed to the delay. As a result, the initial Bill lapsed in 1902.

No attempts were made during the Second Parliament of Australia, owing to the House seats split almost evenly between the Protectionist Party, the Free Trade Party and the new Labour Party. (Note: Described by Alfred Deakin as three elevens in the field, each fighting against the other two teams.)

The next effort to consider the proposal occurred in the Third Parliament of Australia in 1909, when Senator Sir Robert Best introduced the corresponding bill. It failed to proceed, notably because it was also intended to be an industrial tribunal with power to decide whether certain State industrial awards constituted unfair business competition between the States, but the States declined to pass the necessary legislation under the referral power to make the Commission work.

The commission's establishment occurred during the Fourth Parliament of Australia, at which time State practices concerning interstate rivalry and discrimination were becoming quite blatant. Prime Minister Andrew Fisher pushed through the appropriate implementing legislation in 1912.

=== First establishment (1912–1920) ===
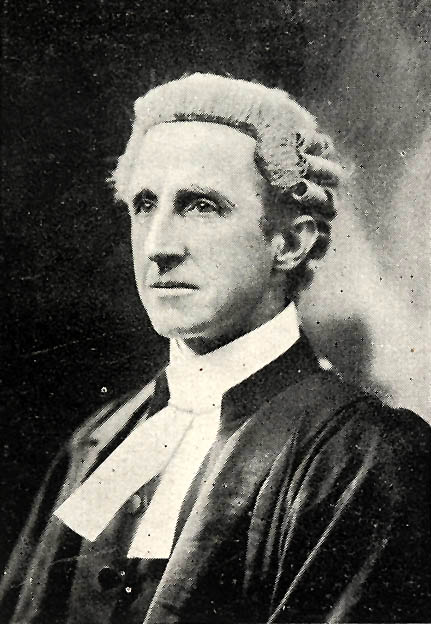
Albert Piddington, Chairman of the Inter-State Commission (1913–1920)

In 1913, the newly elected Cook government appointed Albert Piddington as Chief Commissioner, joining George Swinburne and Sir Nicholas Lockyer.

In addition to wide powers of investigation, the Inter-State Commission Act 1912 granted the Commission judicial power which was broad in scope:

24. The Commission shall have jurisdiction to hear and determine any complaint, dispute, or question, and to adjudicate upon any matter arising as to—

(a) any preference, advantage, prejudice, disadvantage, or discrimination given or made by any State or by any State authority or by any common carrier in contravention of this Act, or of the provisions of the Constitution relating to trade and commerce or any law made thereunder;
(b) the justice or reasonableness of any rate in respect of inter-state commerce, or affecting such commerce;
(c) anything done or omitted to be done by any State or by any State Authority or by any common carrier or by any person in contravention of this Act or of the provisions of the Constitution relating to trade or commerce or any law made thereunder.

The High Court of Australia disagreed in 1915, ruling by 4–2 in the Wheat Case that the Constitution implicitly created a separation of powers, and therefore judicial power can only be vested in the judiciary. (Note: This possibility was contemplated, although described as being "of theoretical interest rather than of practical importance", as early as 1901. However, the general views expressed in the Constitutional Debates as to any provision of the Constitution were held in 1904 to be irrelevant to constitutional interpretation in Tasmania v Commonwealth.) Furthermore, it was held that Chapter Three of the Constitution had the effect that a court must have the following features:

1. being vested with judicial power;
2. not being vested with power other than judicial power; and
3. its members having security of tenure, meaning that members are appointed for life. (Note: as a consequence of the 1977 referendum, this has since been changed to mandatory retirement at age 70)

The Commission as it then existed violated all three criteria. Hence, as it was not part of the judiciary (i.e., not a "Chapter Three Court"), it could not be vested with judicial power. As a result, the s. 73 provision providing for appeals on questions of law from the Commission to the High Court has been 'dead letter law' for most of the Court's history.

Having lost its judicial power in 1915, the Commission "became a body of inquiry without any power of enforcing its decisions." The Commission, without any real purpose, lapsed in 1920 when the terms of the initial Commissioners expired and new appointments were not made. Although there was discussion in the 1930s about reviving the Commission (and a bill on that matter actually received Senate passage in 1938), nothing came about, and the Act itself was formally repealed in 1950.

=== Second establishment (1975–1990) ===
The Commission was reconstituted by the Whitlam Government in 1975 with the envisaged role of inquiring into transport issues that arose due to the federal structure of the Australian government. Issues on the agenda included Victorian shipping to the Riverina; Bass Strait ferries; and disruptions to Fremantle shipping to the eastern states in 1975. In this second incarnation, the Commission did not have any judicial power, but did have powers of arbitration and adjudication, and of investigation and reporting.

The Commission did not become active due to the dismissal of the Whitlam Government. In 1984, following the re-election of Labor Party under Bob Hawke, the Commission received its appointments and was charged with investigating all matters relating to interstate transport. Its first President was the judge Merv Everett.

In 1990, the Commission was abolished with its functions transferred to a new Industry Commission, a statutory body directly responsible to the Commonwealth Government.

== See also ==
- Constitution of Australia
- Separation of powers in Australia
- Federalism in Australia
- Council of Common Interests
- Inter-State Council

== Sources ==
- Bell, Andrew (Winter 2009). "The missing constitutional cog: the omission of the Inter-State Commission" (PDF). Bar News: The Journal of the New South Wales Bar Association: 59–74.
- Gageler, Stephen (2017). "Chapter IV: The Inter-State Commission and the Regulation of Trade and Commerce under the Australian Constitution" (PDF). Public Law Review. 28 (3): 205–218.
- Quick, John (1901). The Annotated Constitution of the Australian Commonwealth. Sydney/Melbourne: Angus & Robertson/Melville & Mullen. pp. 895–922.
- la Nauze, J.A. (1937). "The Inter-State Commission". The Australian Quarterly. 9 (1): 48–58. doi:10.2307/20629406. JSTOR 20629406.
