= Bureau of Industry Economics =

Australian Government body (1977–1998)

Agency overview
- Formed: 1978; 48 years ago
- Dissolved: 16 April 1998
- Superseding agency: Productivity Commission
- Jurisdiction: Federal government of Australia
- Headquarters: Canberra, Australia
- Parent department: Department of Industry and Commerce (1978-1982); Department of Industry and Commerce (II) (1982 - 1984); Department of Industry, Technology and Commerce (1982 - 1993); Department of Industry, Technology and Regional Development (1994); Department of Industry, Science and Technology (1994 - 1996); Department of Industry, Science and Tourism (1996 - 1998

The Bureau of Industry Economics (1978-1998) was an Australian government body dedicated to advising the government on industry matters, particularly pertaining to investment. In 1998 with the passing of the Productivity Commission Act 1998 the bureau was merged with the Industry Commission, and the Economic Planning Advisory Commission to create the Productivity Commission.

In 1992 the Bureau published a report later used by the Howard government detailing potential cuts in the public service. One notable cut was the National Space Program.
