= Industry Commission =

Commission overview
- Formed: 9 March 1990; 36 years ago
- Preceding Commission: Industries Assistance Commission
- Dissolved: 16 April 1998
- Superseding Commission: Productivity Commission
- Jurisdiction: Federal government of Australia
- Website: webarchive.nla.gov.au/awa/19980111184629/http://www.indcom.gov.au/

The Industry Commission was a commission formed by the Australian government in 1990 to oversee industry matters. In 1998 with the passing of the Productivity Commission Act 1998 the bureau was merged with the Bureau of Industry Economics, and the Economic Planning Advisory Commission to create the Productivity Commission.
