= R v Kirby; Ex parte Boilermakers' Society of Australia =

Judgement of the High Court of Australia

- Court: High Court of Australia
- Full case name: The Queen against Kirby and Others; Ex parte Boilermakers' Society of Australia
- Decided: 2 March 1956
- Citations: [1956] HCA 10, (1956) 94 CLR 254

Case history
- Prior actions: Metal Trades Employers Association v Boilermakers Society of Australia (1955) 81 CAR 112 (Orders); Metal Trades Employers Association v Boilermakers Society of Australia (1955) 81 CAR 231 (contempt of court)

Court membership
- Judges sitting: Chief Justice Owen Dixon; Justice Edward McTiernan; Justice Dudley Williams; Justice William Webb; Justice Wilfred Fullagar; Justice Frank Kitto; Justice Alan Taylor

Case opinions
- The judicial power of the Commonwealth cannot be vested in a tribunal that also exercises non-judicial functions (by Dixon, McTiernan, Fullagar and Kitto; Williams and Webb dissenting)

Attorney-General (Cth) v The Queen
- Court: Judicial Committee of the Privy Council
- Decided: 19 March 1957
- Citations: [1957] UKPC 4, [1957] AC 288; [1957] UKPCHCA 1, (1957) 95 CLR 529

Court membership
- Judges sitting: Lord Chancellor Viscount Kilmuir; Viscount Simonds; Lord Morton of Henryton; Lord Tucker; Lord Cohen; Lord Keith of Avonholm; Lord Somervell of Harrow

R v Kirby; Ex parte Boilermakers' Society of Australia, known as the Boilermakers' Case, was a 1956 decision of the High Court of Australia which considered the powers of the Commonwealth Court of Conciliation and Arbitration to punish the Boilermakers' Society of Australia, a union which had disobeyed the orders of that court in relation to an industrial dispute between boilermakers and their employer body, the Metal Trades Employers' Association.

The High Court held that the judicial power of the Commonwealth could not be vested in a tribunal that also exercised non-judicial functions. It is a major case dealing with the separation of powers in Australian law.

== Background ==
=== Separation of powers ===
The High Court had consistently held that the judicial power of the Commonwealth could not be exercised by any body except a court established under Chapter III of the Constitution or a state court invested with federal jurisdiction. This was because the separation of judicial and other powers was a fundamental principle of the Constitution. (Note: New South Wales v Commonwealth [1915] HCA 17, (1915) 20 CLR 54: the Inter-State Commission could not exercise judicial power despite the words of section 101 of the Constitution, because it was set up by the executive and violated the conditions for being a Chapter III court.) (Note: Waterside Workers' Federation of Australia v J W Alexander Ltd [1918] HCA 56, (1918) 25 CLR 434: there was a distinction between judicial and arbitral functions, and the Arbitration Court could not exercise judicial powers of the Commonwealth because the President of the court was appointed for 7 years and not life as required by Chapter III of the Constitution.) (Note: British Imperial Oil Co Ltd v Federal Commissioner of Taxation [1925] HCA 4, (1925) 35 CLR 422: a power of appeal against an income tax assessment was part of the Judicial power of the Commonwealth which could not be conferred upon a Board of Appeal.) (Note: Silk Bros Pty Ltd v State Electricity Commission (Vict) [1943] HCA 2, (1943) 37 CLR 1: a power to determine applications by landlords for recovery of premises and providing for the enforcement of the Board's orders were an invalid attempt to confer judicial power on a body that was not a Federal Court.) (Note: R v Davison [1954] HCA 46, (1954) 90 CLR 353: a registrar was not an officer of the Bankruptcy Court and a legislative attempt to confer upon a registrar the power of making a judicial order was therefore void.)

The High Court had held that the separation of powers did not prevent a federal court or federal judge from discharging other functions. Chief Justice Latham stated that:

Thus, in my opinion, it is not possible to rely upon any doctrine of absolute separation of powers for the purpose of establishing a universal proposition that no court or person who discharges Federal judicial functions can lawfully discharge any other function which has been entrusted to him by statute. This proposition, however, does not involve the further proposition that any powers or duties, of any description whatsoever, may be conferred or imposed upon Federal courts or Federal judges. If a power or duty were in its nature such as to be inconsistent with the co-existence of judicial power, it might well be held that a statutory provision purporting to confer or impose such a power or duty could not stand with the creation of the judicial tribunal or the appointment of a person to act as a member of it.

The power of the Arbitration Court was contained in the Commonwealth Conciliation and Arbitration Act 1904 which relevantly provided that:

29. The Court shall have power-

(b) to order compliance with an order or award proved to the satisfaction of the Court to have been broken or not observed

(c) by order, to enjoin an organization or person from committing or continuing a contravention of this Act or a breach or non-observance of an order or award;

29A (1) The Court has the same power to punish contempts of its power and authority, whether in relation to its judicial powers and functions or otherwise, as is possessed by the High Court in respect of contempts of the High Court.

=== Facts ===
The Metal Trades Award was made by a conciliation commissioner on 16 January 1952 and included a prohibition on industrial action as follows:

(ba) (i) No organization party to this award shall in any way, whether directly or indirectly be a party to or concerned in any ban, limitation or restriction upon the performance of work in accordance with this award.
(ii) An organization shall be deemed to commit a new and separate breach of the above sub-clause on each and every day in which it is directly or indirectly a party to such ban, limitation or restriction.

Members of the Federated Ironworkers Association (FIA) at the Mort's Dock & Engineering Company's shipyard in Balmain, Sydney, including FIA delegate Nick Origlass, went on strike from 16 February 1955 seeking an increase in pay of A£1 per week. Other workers were supporting the strikers by paying a levy of 8 shillings per week. The strike was portrayed by the Communist Party of Australia as a contest between the union members and the National Secretary of the FIA, Laurie Short, who was a grouper, part of the informal Industrial Groups set up by the Labor Party within trade unions to counter the perceived threat of Communist Party influence.

The Arbitration Court made orders against the FIA requiring it to comply with the Metal Trades Award. The strike continued and on 20 May 1955 the FIA was found to be in contempt of court despite genuine attempts to have the employees return to work. No fine was imposed; however, the FIA had to pay legal costs of 160 guineas.

=== Prior actions ===
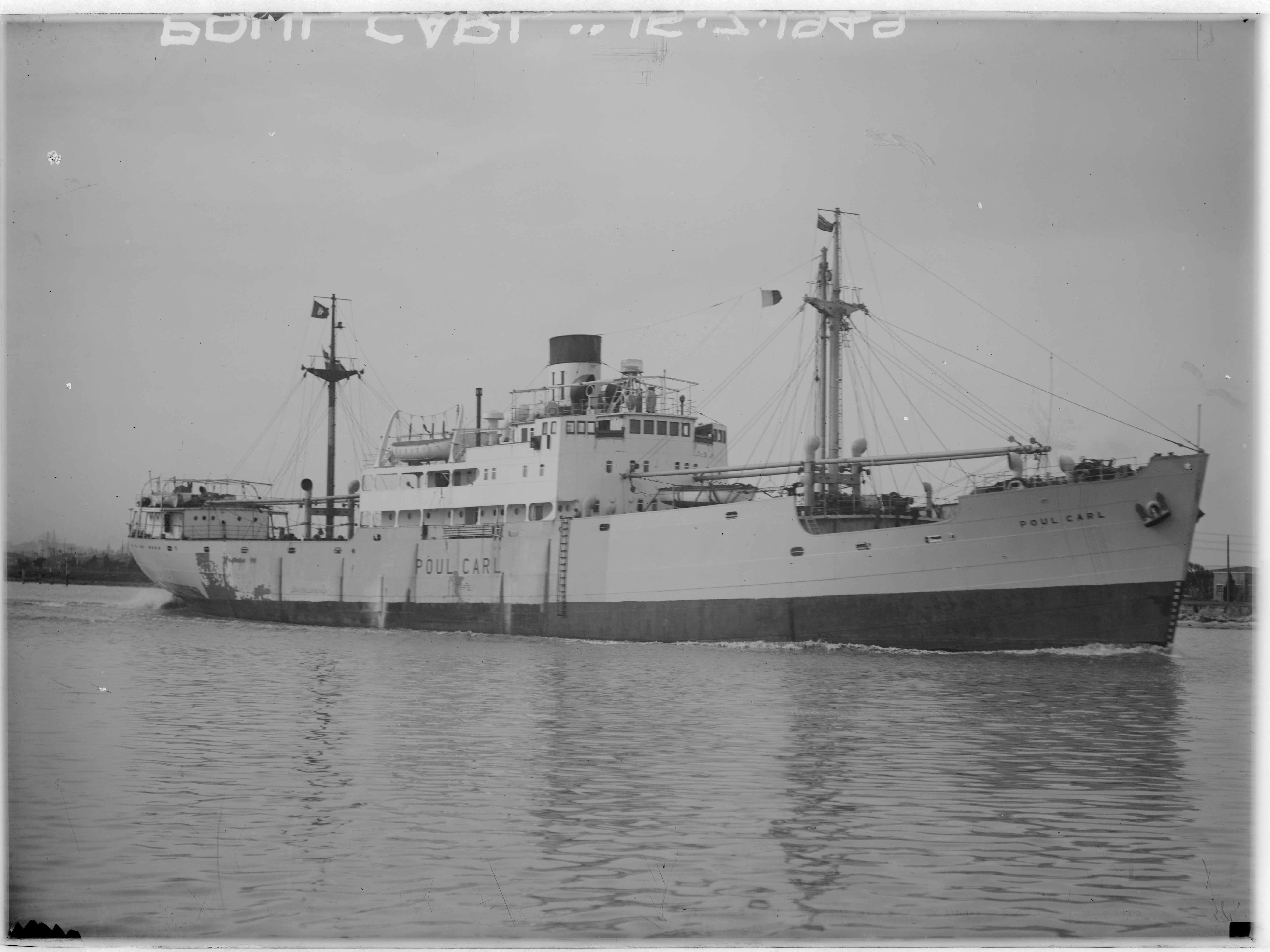
The cargo ship MV Poul Carl

Members of the Boilermakers' Society of Australia were among those supporting the strikers by paying the levy of 8 shillings per week. They also put a ban on repair work on the cargo ship Poul Carl, and the Metal Trades Employers Association sought an order requiring the Boilermakers to comply with the Metal Trades Award. On 21 May 1955 the Arbitration Court, Justices Kirby, Dunphy and Ashburner, held that it had no alternative but to make the orders. The Boilermakers were subsequently found to be in contempt of court by permitting its members to contribute "strike pay", thereby actively subsidising the strike and prolonging it. The Boilermakers were fined A£500 and ordered to pay the employers' legal costs.

=== The High Court application ===
The Boilermakers applied to the High Court for a writ of prohibition compelling Kirby, Dunphy and Ashburner and the Metal Trades Employers Association, to appear before the High Court to show cause why they should not be prohibited from further proceeding on orders. The Boilermakers challenged the orders on the grounds that sections of the Conciliation and Arbitration Act were invalid in that the Court of Conciliation and Arbitration was given non-judicial powers (administrative, arbitral, executive and legislative powers) as well as judicial powers and the separation of powers in Chapter III of the Constitution meant that the same body could not exercise judicial and non-judicial powers. Eggleston QC appeared for the Boilermakers. Menzies QC appeared for the Arbitration Court and the Attorney-General. Macfarlan QC appeared for the Metal Trades Employers Association.

== Judgment of the High Court ==
The High Court held that the judicial power of the Commonwealth could not be vested in a tribunal that also exercised non-judicial functions. It is a major case dealing with the separation of powers in Australian law.

=== Grant of both judicial and non-judicial powers ===
Dixon, McTiernan, Fullagar and Kitto held that it was:

impossible to escape the conviction that Chap. III does not allow the exercise of a jurisdiction which of its very nature belongs to the judicial power of the Commonwealth by a body established for purposes foreign to the judicial power, notwithstanding that it is organized as a court and in a manner which might otherwise satisfy ss. 71 and 72, and that Chap. III does not allow a combination with judicial power of functions which are not ancillary or incidental to its exercise but are foreign to it.

There were three key elements to the majority decision

1. The constitution embodied the separation of judicial power from legislative and executive power;
2. Chapter III & matters incidental thereto were the sole source of power for a federal court or judge; and
3. The arbitration power was foreign to the judicial power.

Each of the dissenting judges took a slightly different approach. Williams agreed that only a court could exercise judicial power, but held that there was no express prohibition on a court exercising non-judicial powers, rejecting an "implication in the Constitution arising from the vague concept of the separation of powers". Webb held that the Constitution should be interpreted liberally and the previous decisions of the High Court should be followed. Taylor saw difficulties in defining or identifying judicial functions, including the overlapping powers or functions that could not be clearly defined as exclusively legislative, executive or judicial.

=== Is it the grant of judicial or of non-judicial powers which fails ===
The majority opinion of Dixon, McTiernan, Fullagar and Kitto, held simply that the Arbitration Court was "a tribunal established and equipped primarily and predominantly for the work of industrial conciliation and arbitration" and thus held it was the attachment of powers of judicial enforcement that were invalid.

Williams held that if the combination of powers was not permissible, it would be the arbitral functions that would be invalid. Webb took a different approach, holding that while judicial power could only be exercised by judges, the arbitral functions could be exercised by anyone, including by individuals who happened to be judges, referred to as persona designata. Taylor did not address this issue.

== Privy Council ==
On 1 June 1956 the attorney-general obtained leave to appeal to the Privy Council, and was represented by the Solicitor-General, Bailey QC. The Boilermakers filed submissions by Eggleston QC, however they did not appear at the hearing.

The advice of the Privy Council was delivered by Viscount Simonds. (Note: At the time there was no provision for dissent or separate judgments in the Privy Council. Instead the advice to the Queen was determined by a majority of judges who heard the appeal and one judge would be chosen to write the judgment. Decisions of the Privy Council tended to be expressed on narrow grounds, a tendency attributed to the need to reflect the agreement of the majority of judges.) The Privy Council largely followed the reasoning of the majority of the High Court.

The question in whatever for it is stated is whether and how far judicial and non-judicial power can be united in the same body. Their Lordships do not doubt that the decision of the High Court is right and that there is nothing in Chap. III, to which alone recourse can be had, which justifies such a union.

The Privy Council concluded that "The true criterion is not what powers are expressly or by implication excluded from the scope of Chapter III but what powers are expressly or by implication included in it".

== Aftermath ==
The significance of the case was that it restricted the use of judicial power only to Chapter III courts (under the Australian Constitution), as well as establishing that these courts could exercise no other power. In this way, it clarified the separation of powers doctrine in Australia.

The decision led to the abolition of the Commonwealth Court of Conciliation and Arbitration and the creation of two new Australian industrial relations bodies: the Conciliation and Arbitration Commission (later known as the Australian Industrial Relations Commission), whose limited-term members could create industrial awards and settle interstate industrial disputes, and the Commonwealth Industrial Court, whose judges could interpret and enforce awards made by the Commission.

There are few Privy Council decisions about the Australian Constitution that are cited in the High Court. While the decision in Boilermakers is often cited, it is High Court decision that is cited, with the notation that it was affirmed by the Privy Council.
