= Persona designata =

Legal doctrine

The persona designata doctrine is a doctrine in law, particularly in Canadian and Australian constitutional law which states that, although it is generally impermissible for a federal judge to exercise non-judicial power, it is permissible for a judge to do so if the power has been conferred on the judge personally, as opposed to powers having been conferred on the court. The doctrine in the more general sense has been recognised throughout the common law countries (including the United States). Persona designata, according to Black's Law Dictionary, means "A person considered as an individual rather than as a member of a class"; thus it may be a person specifically named or identified in a lawsuit, as opposed to the one belonging to an identified category or group. While it has its origin in Montesquieu's doctrine of the separation of powers, it can be traced back as far as Aristotle's Politics.

In Australia the doctrine is considered to be an exception to the Boilermakers' doctrine of separation of powers, which holds that conferral of non-judicial power which is not incidental to the exercise of judicial power on a Chapter III court (a federal court) is unconstitutional.

== Background ==
While the Australian system of government is parliamentary, with a "fusion of powers" between the executive and the legislature, the separation of powers with respect to the judiciary has long been accepted as an important aspect of the Constitution of Australia. The importance of the principle is traditionally said to have reached its high point in 1956 with the Boilermakers' case, in which the High Court of Australia held that non-judicial power could not be conferred on a federal (ie Commonwealth) court established under Chapter III of the Australian Constitution. However, Australia also has a long history of judges being appointed to non-judicial positions.

The idea that some non-judicial functions can be conferred on judges in their personal capacity had been present in Australian law for some time; some trace it to cases such as Medical Board of Victoria v Meyer in 1937, while others regard the doctrine as settled law since at least 1906, and the case of Holmes v Angwin.

== Development of the doctrine ==
The first clear expression of the doctrine in the post-Boilermakers context was in the 1979 Federal Court of Australia case of Drake v Minister for Immigration & Ethnic Affairs, which concerned a challenge to the appointment of Justice Daryl Davies, of the Federal Court, to the position of Deputy President of the Administrative Appeals Tribunal. In their joint judgment, Chief Justice Bowen and Justice Deane said:

"There is nothing in the Constitution which precludes a justice [of a Chapter III court] from, in his personal capacity, being appointed to an office involving the performance of administrative or executive functions including functions which are quasi-judicial in their nature. Such an appointment does not involve any impermissible attempt to confer upon a Chapter III court functions which are antithetical to the exercise of judicial power. Indeed, it does not involve the conferring of any functions at all on such a court."

The doctrine was first clearly applied by the High Court of Australia in the 1985 case of Hilton v Wells, which involved a challenge to the constitutional validity of certain telecommunications legislation which permitted telephone tapping by way of a warrant, which had to be issued by "a judge". The word "judge" in that piece of legislation was defined to mean a judge of the Federal Court or of the Supreme Court of the Australian Capital Territory, or, in certain circumstances, a judge of the Supreme Court of the Northern Territory or any of the State Supreme Courts. In their majority judgment, Chief Justice Gibbs and Justices Wilson and Dawson acknowledged the difficulty of determining whether a function has been conferred on a court or on a judge of that court, saying that:

"It is a question which involves fine distinctions, which some may regard as unsatisfactory... the question is one of construction. Where the power is conferred on a court, there will ordinarily be a strong presumption that the court as such is intended. Where the power is conferred on a judge, rather than on a court, it will be a question whether the distinction was deliberate, and whether the reference to "judge" rather than to "court" indicates that the power was intended to be invested in the judge as an individual who, because he is a judge, possesses the necessary qualifications to exercise it."

The Justices continued, and considered the significance of the nature of the function being conferred to the question of whether the function is to be exercised by the judge in their capacity as a judge, or in their capacity as a regular person:

"If the power is judicial, it is likely that it is intended to be exercisable by the judge by virtue of that character; if it is purely administrative, and not incidental to the exercise of judicial power, it is likely that it is intended to be exercised by the judge as a designated person."

The High Court rejected the challenge to the constitutional validity of the legislation in a three to two decision. Mason and Deane JJ, in dissent, rejected the notion that functions, such as those granted under s 20 of the Telecommunications (Interceptions) Act 1979 (Cth) to provide for the ability of judges to issue telephone taps, could be exercised constitutionally by 'judges' as defined by s 18 of the Act. Mason and Deane JJ were of the opinion that conferring non-judicial functions could not be granted to a Chapter III court without undermining the doctrine in Boilermaker's Case and the separation of powers prescribed by the Constitution as 'a safeguard of individual liberty'.

Following Hilton, the Telecommunications (Interception) Act 1979 (Cth) was amended to clarify that judges who authorised telephone taps under the legislation were acting as a persona designata and not in breach of the constitutionally warranted separation of powers between the judiciary, executive and legislature.

=== Limits ===
Two broad limits to the doctrine have been identified, which essentially act as preconditions to the conferral of a non-judicial function:

1. the judge must agree to the conferral of the function, and
2. the function must not be incompatible with the judge's judicial functions.

=== Incompatibility ===
The issue of incompatibility was expounded in the 1995 case of Grollo v Palmer, which concerned new provisions in the same telecommunications legislation that had been considered in Hilton v Wells. Following the decision in Hilton, the legislation had been amended to make it more explicit that the function of granting warrants was being conferred on judges in their personal capacity, and had made the judge's consent an eligibility requirement, but the changes had also introduced protections and immunities for judges exercising the function, like those afforded to Justices of the High Court. The court unanimously agreed that the function was being conferred on the judges as personae designatae, but the question was whether the function was incompatible with their judicial office.

In a joint majority judgment, Chief Justice Brennan and Justices Deane, Dawson and Toohey, discussed what situations might enliven the incompatibility condition:

"Incompatibility might consist in so permanent and complete a commitment to the performance of non-judicial functions by a judge that the further performance of substantial judicial functions by that judge is not practicable. It might consist in the performance of non-judicial functions of such a nature that the capacity of the judge to perform his or her judicial functions with integrity is impaired. Or it might consist in the performance of non-judicial functions of such a nature that public confidence in the integrity of the judiciary as an institution or in the capacity of the individual judge to perform his or her judicial functions with integrity is diminished."

The majority held that, although the function of issuing warrants was closely connected with the purely executive process of law enforcement, it did not amount to judicial participation in a criminal investigation (which would be incompatible) and that the participation of impartial, independent judicial officers in the process would actually reinforce public confidence in the judiciary. That is, the majority recognised that the incompatibility exception existed, but found that it did not apply in this situation.

In 1996, the High Court applied the incompatibility condition in the case of Wilson v Minister for Aboriginal and Torres Strait Islander Affairs which concerned the appointment of Justice Jane Mathews of the Federal Court to prepare an Indigenous heritage report in relation to the Hindmarsh Island bridge development.The court held that legislation authorising the appointment was invalid, because the functions conferred, which included forming opinions and giving advice about areas which should be protected under heritage legislation, were incompatible with judicial office.

== Criticisms ==
D M Gordon wrote in the Canadian Bar Review:

"the whole persona designata conception could be scrapped without the slightest inconvenience or the least distortion of legal principles". This view has been upheld numerous times in Canadian Supreme Court decisions. For instance in Re Herman and Dep. A.-G. Can (1978), Chief Justice Laskin stated:

"The concept of persona designata came from the Courts and it can be modified or abolished by the Courts. In my view, I think this Court should declare that whenever a statutory power is conferred upon a Judge or officer of a Court, the power should be deemed exercisable in official capacity as representing the Court unless there is express provision to the contrary. "

and affirmed in Minister of Indian Affairs & Northern Development v. Ranville (1982) where Dickson J. held:

" I was rather of the opinion that this troublesome notion of persona designata had been given its quietus in the recent Herman decision. The Chief Justice's aversion in Herman to the concept of persona designata could not have been more evident (at pp. 4–5 D.L.R., pp. 731–2 S.C.R.):

– it is high time to relieve the Courts of the interpretative exercises that have been common in this country when they think that a decision has to be made whether a statutory jurisdiction has been vested in a Judge qua Judge or as persona designata. –

In the test formulated in Herman I endeavoured to confine the notion of persona designata to the most exceptional circumstances. The Federal Court of Appeal and the provincial courts which have had to deal with the notion since the Herman decision have grasped how exceptional recourse to persona designata must be. So far as I am aware, in applying the test in Herman, no federally-appointed judge has yet been found to be a persona designata"

== See also ==
- Legal person
- Separation of powers in Australia

== Additional references ==
- Groves M, Lee HP. Australian Administrative Law: Fundamentals, principles and doctrines. Cambridge 2007
- Northern Territory University: Australian Public Law
- Lacey W. Inherent jurisdiction, judicial power and implied guarantees under chapter III of the Constitution. Fed Law Rev 2003
