= Tasmania v Commonwealth =

- Court: High Court of Australia
- Full case name: State of Tasmania v The Commonwealth of Australia and State of Victoria
- Decided: 8 June 1904
- Citations: [1904] HCA 11, (1904) 1 CLR 329

Court membership
- Judges sitting: Griffith CJ, Barton & O'Connor JJ

Tasmania v Commonwealth, is a landmark decision of the High Court of Australia in 1904. The case concerned a claim by Tasmanian for customs tariffs collected in Victoria during the period between Federation and the commencement of the Commonwealth Customs Tariff. Significantly, the High Court established that the Australian Constitution should interpreted consistently with the ordinary rules of statutory interpretation.

== Background ==
The case concerned customs and excise duties in the transition period following the federation of Australia on 1 January 1901. The intention of the Constitution was that uniform customs duties would be imposed within two years after federation (Note: It is an interesting academic question as to what would have been the consequences if the Federal Parliament had been unable to agree on a tariff and to pass it into law.) and that once uniform customs duties were imposed, trade, commerce, and intercourse among the States shall be absolutely free. The Constitution recognised this would take some time to implement and addressed that transition in 3 periods. The first period was from federation "until the imposition of uniform duties of customs." The second period was from the imposition of uniform duties for 2 years. The third period was between 2 and 5 years from the imposition of uniform duties.

On 8 October 1901 the Commonwealth had imposed uniform customs duties. The Commonwealth had collected customs duties on goods imported into Victoria and excise duty on goods manufactured in Victoria during the first period. During the second period those goods were transported to Tasmania for consumption. The Commonwealth paid the net revenue to Victoria said to be pursuant to section 89 of the Australian Constitution. Tasmania claimed the Commonwealth should have paid the net revenue to it. While the Commonwealth was represented at the hearing, it did not present any argument.

Tasmania's argument invited the High Court to depart from the usual approach to statutory interpretation when interpreting the Australian Constitution. In the course of that argument, Tasmania argued that the contested provisions should be applied consistently with draft bills for the Australian Constitution prepared during the Constitutional Conventions.

== Decision ==
The High Court unanimously held that Tasmania was not entitled under section 89 of the Australian Constitution to be credited with the customs duties collected by the Commonwealth.

More significant than the High Court's ruling, were its statements regarding the correct approach to the interpretation of the Australian Constitution. The High Court concluded that the Australian Constitution should be interpreted according to the approach applied to legislation generally.

Griffith CJ held that:

I will refer to some rules which have been laid down for the interpretation of Acts of Parliament, for this Constitution is an Act of Parliament. ... It is, however, always a question of construction, whether we are called upon to construe the terms of a section, or to decide whether powers are necessarily to be implied in addition to those which are expressed. The same rules of interpretation apply that apply to any other written document.

Barton J similarly applied principles of statutory construction that the ordinary meaning of the words and their grammatical construction applied unless there were reasons from its context or intention to construe the provision otherwise.

O'Connor J stated that :

I do not think it can be too strongly stated that our duty in interpreting a Statute is to declare and administer the law according to the intention expressed in the Statute itself. In this respect the Constitution differs in no way from any Statute of the Commonwealth or of a State. ... The intention of the enactment is to be gathered from its words. If the words are plain, effect must be given to them; if they are doubtful, the intention of the legislature is to be gathered from the other provisions of the Statute aided by a consideration of surrounding circumstances. In all cases in order to discover the intention you may have recourse to contemporaneous circumstances – to the history of the law ... In considering the history of the law ... you must have regard to the historical facts surrounding the bringing [of] the law into existence. ... You may deduce the intention of the legislature from a consideration of the instrument itself in the light of these facts and circumstances, but you cannot go beyond it.
