= Section 122 of the Constitution of Australia =

Section dealing with governance by Australian territories

Section 122 of the Constitution of Australia deals with matters relating to the governance of Australian territories. It gives the Commonwealth Parliament complete legislative power over the territories. This power is called the territories power. The extent and terms of the representation of the territories in the House of Representatives and the Senate are also stated as being at the discretion of the Commonwealth Parliament.

The precise text of the section is:

The Parliament may make laws for the government of any territory surrendered by any State to and accepted by the Commonwealth, or of any territory placed by the Queen under the authority of and accepted by the Commonwealth, or otherwise acquired by the Commonwealth, and may allow the representation of such territory in either House of the Parliament to the extent and on the terms which it thinks fit.

== Relationship with other provisions ==
The usual interpretation of the territories power is that it is a plenary power which is not limited by other provisions in the Constitution, notably section 51. The High Court has revisited its interpretations of section 122 over the years leading to what David Mossop, a judge of the ACT Supreme Court, described as a lack of "a coherent body of doctrine" guiding interpretation of the section.

Parliament's Section 52 powers over acquired property are distinct from its Section 122 powers.

=== Territory courts ===
A court created for a Territory under the territories power is not a "court created by Parliament" for the purposes of Chapter III of the Constitution, even if the law constituting the court was passed by the Federal Parliament. This means that the protections of judicial tenure or the mandatory retirement found in section 72 do not apply to judges of Territory courts. Indictable criminal offences against the law of a Territory do not have to be heard before a jury as section 80 requires of an indictable Commonwealth offense. Despite this separation of the Territory courts from the other courts, a law which confers a non-judicial power incompatible with the exercise of federal judicial power would be invalid under the rule in Kable.

=== Creation of territory legislatures ===
The High Court views territory legislatures to be "new legislative powers" akin to historic colonial legislatures created by the British Parliament. That is to say that, although territory legislatures derive their power from federal law, they are not delegated federal legislative power. A consequence of this is that the territory parliaments are not exercising federal legislative power and cannot enact laws that are exclusive to the federal parliament, such as excises under section 90 of the Constitution.

=== "Just terms" compensation in the territories ===
In the earlier part of the 20th century, the High Court ruled that the "just terms" compensation requirement that applies when the Commonwealth compulsorily acquires property under section 51(xxxi) also does not apply in the territories. That said, the Self-Government Acts of the Australian Capital Territory and the Northern Territory include similar "just terms" clauses restricting the powers of those Territories' parliaments. However, more recent High Court decisions have cast doubt on this proposition. In the 2009 case Wurridjal, the High Court appeared to overrule the earlier cases with respect to compulsory acquisitions of Aboriginal land in the Northern Territory. In May 2023, the Full Federal Court endorsed a broader reading of Wurridjal in the Yunipingu case which suggests that the "just terms" requirement applies to acquisitions of property in the territories.

== See also ==
- Commonwealth v Yunupingu (2023 Federal Court, then 2025 High Court appeal, relating to native title claim compensation)
