= Section 51(xxxviii) of the Constitution of Australia =

Assertion of Australian legal sovereignty

Section 51(xxxviii) of the Constitution of Australia was intended to give the states of Australia independence from the UK Parliament, as it authorised the Commonwealth Parliament to, with the consent of the relevant state parliament(s), do anything the UK Parliament could do on their behalf, including repeal British laws that applied to them.^{:164}

Despite this, the Commonwealth itself remained subject to Imperial laws of paramount force,^{:165} until it finally evolved full legislative independence from the UK with the passage of the Statute of Westminster Adoption Act 1942.^{:167}

51. The Parliament shall, subject to this Constitution, have power to make laws for the peace, order, and good government of the Commonwealth with respect to: [...]

(xxxviii.) The exercise within the Commonwealth, at the request or with the concurrence of the Parliaments of all the States directly concerned, of any power which can at the establishment of this Constitution be exercised only by the Parliament of the United Kingdom or by the Federal Council of Australasia.
