= New South Wales v Commonwealth (1915) =

- Court: High Court of Australia
- Decided: 23 March 1915
- Citations: [1915] HCA 17, (1915) 20 CLR 54

Case history
- Prior action: Commonwealth v NSW (Inter-State Commission 22 February 1915)

Court membership
- Judges sitting: Griffith CJ, Barton, Isaacs, Gavan Duffy, Powers and Rich JJ

Case opinions
- (4:2) The Constitution separated the legislative, executive and judicial functions of Government. The Inter-State Commission was part of the executive function and could not exercise judicial power. (per Griffith CJ, Isaacs, Powers & Rich JJ) (Barton & Gavan Duffy JJ dissenting) (6:0) Freedom of interstate trade is not infringed if there is no differentiation arising by reason of interstate trade. (per Griffith CJ, Barton, Isaacs, Gavan Duffy, Powers & Rich JJ)

New South Wales v Commonwealth, commonly known as the Wheat case, or more recently as the Inter-State Commission case, is a landmark Australian judgment of the High Court made in 1915 regarding judicial separation of power. It was also a leading case on the freedom of interstate trade and commerce that is guaranteed by section 92 of the Constitution.

== Background ==
In 1914 there were rising prices in Australia for various commodities, including wheat, caused by a drought in Australia from 1911 to 1916 and the outbreak of World War I in July 1914. The initial response of the Parliament of NSW was to fix the price of wheat at 4s 2d (4 shillings and 2 pence) per bushel while the then market price was 5 p higher at 4s 7d. Farmers and merchants refused to sell their wheat at that price and resulted in the Government seizure of wheat stored at railway yards. By December 1914 the market price in Victoria had risen to 5s 6d. The NSW Parliament passed the Wheat Acquisition Act 1914 to compulsorily acquire wheat in NSW and for varying or cancelling contracts for the sale and delivery of wheat, paying a price of 5s per bushel of wheat acquired. The acquisition necessarily prevented the performance of any existing contracts for the sale of wheat in NSW to be exported to another State.

In January 1915, the Commonwealth applied to the Inter-State Commission for an order to prohibit the NSW Government and the NSW Inspector-General of Police from preventing the exportation of wheat to other States on the basis that this acquisition infringed the Constitution's guarantee of freedom of interstate trade and commerce. The commission consisted of a chief commissioner, Albert Piddington, who had been briefly appointed to the High Court but resigned before hearing a case, and two laypersons, George Swinburne and Nicholas Lockyer (Comptroller-General of Customs). The Inter-State Commission found that the NSW Wheat Acquisition was invalid and made the order sought by the Commonwealth, with Swinburne and Lockyer finding that NSW had contravened section 92 of the Constitution by compulsorily acquiring wheat which was the subject of contracts for interstate sale and was in the course of interstate transport. Piddington disagreed, holding that the Act was a valid exercise of the power of a State to compulsorily acquire food for the civilian population.

NSW appealed to the High Court, challenging the decision not only on the basis that NSW contended that it had not infringed the freedom of interstate commerce, but challenged the very foundation of the Inter-State Commission. The argument was that the Inter-State Commission Act 1912, was contrary to the separation of powers that was implicit in the Constitution. The argument had its foundation in the structure of the Constitution, where chapter 1 dealt with the Parliament, chapter 2 with the Executive Government and chapter 3 with the Judicature. The Inter-State Commission is not within any of these chapters, instead it is within chapter 4 which deals with finance and trade.

The idea that the executive is unable to exercise judicial power has its origins in the 1607 decision in the Case of Prohibitions which held that the King had no right to personally sit as a judge and interpret the law. The more immediate precursor was the separation of powers under the United States Constitution including the power of the Supreme Court to review whether a law passed by Congress was unconstitutional.

== Decision ==
The High Court upheld the appeal by NSW on both grounds, the majority deciding that the strict insulation of judicial power was a fundamental principle of the Constitution. All judges held that the compulsory acquisition of all wheat, even though it included wheat that was the subject of interstate trade, did not contravene the freedom of interstate trade that was guaranteed by section 92 of the Constitution.

=== Judicial power under the Constitution ===
The High Court held that only a court established under Chapter III of the constitution can exercise the judicial power of the Commonwealth. The Inter-State Commission created by the Inter-State Commission Act 1912 could not exercise judicial power despite the words of section 101 of the Constitution, because it was set up by the executive and violated the conditions for being a Chapter III court.

Griffith CJ noted that under the Constitution a judge of a federal court was appointed for life, while a member of the Inter-State Commission was appointed for a seven-year term and that s73 identified the Inter-State Commission as separate and distinct from a federal court. His Honour held

the functions of the Inter-State Commission contemplated by the Constitution are executive or administrative, and the powers of adjudication intended are such powers of determining questions of fact as may be necessary for the performance of its executive or administrative functions.

Isaacs J considered the use of the word adjudication in section 101 of the Constitution and the related reference in section 73 to "judgments, decrees, orders, and sentences" of, inter alia, the Inter-State Commission. His Honour found that the separation of powers was a fundamental principle of the Constitution.

Rich J held that "The Constitution draws a clear distinction – well known in all British communities – between the legislative, executive and judicial functions of Government of the Commonwealth." and that the Inter-State Commission fitted within the executive function, holding that "I see no reason why powers of adjudication and administration which may be conferred by Parliament on the Inter-State Commission ... should be any wider in scope than the power conferred upon the Executive by sec. 61. Indeed, one would expect that they might well be something less."

Powers J agreed with Griffith CJ and Isaacs J.

Barton & Gavan Duffy JJ disagreed. Barton J held that the Constitution gave the Parliament an absolute discretion as to what adjudicatory or administrative powers it deemed necessary for the Inter-State Commission.

=== Freedom of interstate trade and commerce ===
Griffith CJ held that the power of a State to power to expropriate private property was a power inherent in sovereignty, provided the property was within the territorial limits of the State.

Barton J similarly held that a State had the power to expropriate property. While the Act changed the ownership of wheat, it did not prevent the State as the new owner from participating in interstate trade.

Isaacs J held that because all wheat in NSW was treated alike, with no differentiation arising by reason of inter-State trade, there was no interference with interstate trade.

... while neither States nor Commonwealth can detract from the absolute freedom of trade and commerce between Australian citizens in the property they possess, there is nothing to prevent either States or Commonwealth, for their own lawful purposes, from becoming themselves owners of that property and applying it, according to law, to the common welfare

Gavan Duffy J. said:—

It is to be observed that sec. 51 (I.) of the Constitution enables Parliament to make laws for the peace, order, and good government of the Commonwealth with respect to Trade and commerce with other countries, and among the States. The words absolutely free in sec. 92 must, therefore, be subject to some limitation so as to give them a meaning which is consistent with the existence of this legislative power, and the meaning when ascertained must be the same always and in all conceivable circumstances; it must apply equally when we are considering the right of the Commonwealth to legislate under sec. 51 (i.), and of the States to legislate under sec. 107.

== Significance ==
The Wheat case sounded the death knell, not only to the Inter-State Commission, but also to the combined function approach to administrative adjudication in Australia. The decision continues to have ramifications for both federal courts and non-judicial tribunals and has been followed in numerous High Court decisions, including

- Waterside Workers' Federation of Australia v J W Alexander Ltd where the majority of the High Court held that because the President of the Commonwealth Court of Conciliation and Arbitration was appointed for 7 years and not life as required by Chapter 3 of the Constitution, the Court could not exercise judicial powers of the Commonwealth.
- British Imperial Oil Co Ltd v Federal Commissioner of Taxation a power of appeal against an income tax assessment was part of the Judicial power of the Commonwealth which could not be conferred upon a Board of Appeal.
- Silk Bros Pty Ltd v State Electricity Commission (Vict) a power to determine applications by landlords for recovery of premises and providing for the enforcement of the Board's orders were an invalid attempt to confer Judicial power on a body that was not a Federal Court.
- R v Davison a registrar was not an officer of the Bankruptcy Court and a legislative attempt to confer upon a registrar the power of making a judicial order was therefore void.
- R v Kirby; Ex parte Boilermakers' Society of Australia (Boilermakers' case) established the second limb of the separation of powers doctrine in that a Federal court established under Chapter 3 of the Constitution could not exercise executive power of the Commonwealth.
- Re Wakim; Ex parte McNally that while the constitution permitted the Commonwealth to vest jurisdiction in State Courts, it did not permit the States to vest jurisdiction in Federal Courts.
