= Australian Law Reports =

The Australian Law Reports are a series of law reports which report cases from the High Court of Australia, Federal Court of Australia and the Supreme Courts of the states and territories exercising federal jurisdiction. The reports are not officially authorised. After each authorised series they are the most often cited series of law reports in Australia. They were previously called the Australian Argus Law Reports.

== See also ==
- Commonwealth Law Reports
- List of Law Reports in Australia
