= Chapter III Court =

Chapter of the Constitution of Australia establishing the Judicature

In Australian constitutional law, Chapter III of the Constitution of Australia establishes the Judicature and vests the judicial power of the Commonwealth in the High Court of Australia and such other federal courts as the Parliament creates. Courts capable of exercising Commonwealth judicial power are commonly called Chapter III courts.

Chapter III comprises sections 71 to 80. The text of each section is set out below, with the relevant analysis.

== Separation of powers in Australia ==
The doctrine of separation of powers refers to a system of government whereby three aspects of government power—legislative power, executive power, and judicial power—are vested in separate institutions. This doctrine holds that abuse of power can be avoided by each arm of government acting as a check on another. In Australia, this separation is implied in the structure of the Constitution. Chapter I outlines legislative power—the making, altering or repealing of laws; Chapter II outlines executive power—the general and detailed carrying on of governmental functions; Chapter III outlines judicial power—the interpretation of law, and adjudication according to law.

== Section 71: Judicial power and Courts ==
The judicial power of the Commonwealth shall be vested in a Federal Supreme Court, to be called the High Court of Australia, and in such other federal courts as the Parliament creates, and in such other courts as it invests with federal jurisdiction. The High Court shall consist of a Chief Justice, and so many other Justices, not less than two, as the Parliament prescribes.

— Constitution of Australia, s 71

=== What constitutes judicial power ===
Judicial power is not defined in the Australian Constitution. Instead, it must be determined by reference to seven indicia, viz:

1. binding and conclusive decisions
2. enforceability
3. decisions made about existing rights or duties
4. discretion limited to situations with legally ascertainable tests
5. need for a controversy
6. opinion of the drafters of the Constitution
7. nature of the body on which power is conferred

=== Chapter III Courts as principal repositories of Commonwealth judicial power ===
The judicial power of the Commonwealth can be exercised only by a Chapter III Court or by a state court in which Commonwealth judicial power has been vested under s 77(iii) of the Constitution (although the reverse is not possible). In New South Wales v Commonwealth (1915) (The Wheat Case), the High Court held that judicial power is vested in a court as described under Chapter III, and no other body can exercise judicial power. In that case, it was held that the Inter-State Commission could not exercise judicial power despite the words of the Constitution, because it appeared in Chapter IV of the Constitution, and not Chapter III. More importantly, the commission was set up by the executive and violated the conditions for being a Chapter III court.

There are some exceptions to the rule. Firstly, judicial power may be given to a non-judicial agent provided the judges still bear the major responsibility for exercise of the power and the exercise of power is subject to court review.

Secondly, there are four discrete exceptions:

1. contempt of Parliament
2. courts-martial
3. public service tribunals
4. detention
  - of non-citizens
  - of the mentally ill or those with infectious diseases
  - by police for a limited period of time
  - for the welfare/protection of a person

=== Chapter III courts wielding non-judicial power ===
A Chapter III court cannot discharge powers other than judicial power, except where the function is ancillary to the purpose of the judicial function. In the Boilermakers' Case, the High Court held that a court that discharges both arbitration and judicial powers was invalid. The majority justices held that the maintenance of the constitutional system of government required a rigid adherence to separation of powers.

The only exception to this rule is the discharge of functions ancillary to the exercise of judicial power. Section 51(xxxix) of the Constitution allows the Parliament to vest in Chapter III courts any power incidental to its exercise of judicial power. This exception has in subsequent cases been used to allow courts to be vested with wide-ranging powers. Thus, in R v Joske; Ex parte Australian Building Construction Employees and Builders' Labourers' Federation, powers such as reorganising unions and invalidating union rules were allowed to be exercised by a Chapter III court.

However, the exclusion of non-judicial power from a Chapter III court does not preclude individual justices from performing non-judicial functions, provided that they do so in their personal capacity; that is, they act as "persona designata".

== Section 72: Judges' appointment, tenure, and remuneration ==
The Justices of the High Court and of the other courts created by the Parliament:

(i) shall be appointed by the Governor-General in Council; (ii) shall not be removed except by the Governor-General in Council, on an address from both Houses of the Parliament in the same session, praying for such removal on the ground of proved misbehaviour or incapacity; (iii) shall receive such remuneration as the Parliament may fix; but the remuneration shall not be diminished during their continuance in office.

The appointment of a Justice of the High Court shall be for a term expiring upon his attaining the age of seventy years, and a person shall not be appointed as a Justice of the High Court if he has attained that age.

The appointment of a Justice of a court created by the Parliament shall be for a term expiring upon his attaining the age that is, at the time of his appointment, the maximum age for Justices of that court and a person shall not be appointed as a Justice of such a court if he has attained the age that is for the time being the maximum age for Justices of that court.

Subject to this section, the maximum age for Justices of any court created by the Parliament is seventy years.

The Parliament may make a law fixing an age that is less than seventy years as the maximum age for Justices of a court created by the Parliament and may at any time repeal or amend such a law, but any such repeal or amendment does not affect the term of office of a Justice under an appointment made before the repeal or amendment.

A Justice of the High Court or of a court created by the Parliament may resign his office by writing under his hand delivered to the Governor-General.

Nothing in the provisions added to this section by the Constitution Alteration (Retirement of Judges) 1977 affects the continuance of a person in office as a Justice of a court under an appointment made before the commencement of those provisions.

A reference in this section to the appointment of a Justice of the High Court or of a court created by the Parliament shall be read as including a reference to the appointment of a person who holds office as a Justice of the High Court or of a court created by the Parliament to another office of Justice of the same court having a different status or designation.

— Constitution of Australia, s 72

=== What constitutes a Chapter III Court ===
Federal courts must have those features contained in Chapter III of the Constitution of Australia.

These features serve two purposes: firstly, they prescribe the features of any court created by the federal government; and secondly, they serve as criteria when deciding whether a body qualifies as a Chapter III Court.

The main feature of a Chapter III Court is security of tenure. Under section 72 of the Constitution, justices of federal courts are to be appointed by the Governor-General in Council; have a term of office lasting until they are 70 years of age (unless Parliament legislates to reduce this maximum age before their appointment); and receive a remuneration which must not diminish during their term in office.

Chapter III judges cannot be removed except upon an address from both houses of the Parliament of Australia in the same session, "praying for such removal on the ground of proved misbehaviour or incapacity". Thus, a judge cannot be removed except in the most extraordinary of circumstances. The only instance where the situation has even been close to arising was during the tenure of Justice Murphy of the High Court. However, he died in 1986 before procedures to remove him could begin.

== Section 73: Appellate jurisdiction of High Court ==
The High Court shall have jurisdiction, with such exceptions and subject to such regulations as the Parliament prescribes, to hear and determine appeals from all judgments, decrees, orders, and sentences:

(i) of any Justice or Justices exercising the original jurisdiction of the High Court; (ii) of any other federal court, or court exercising federal jurisdiction; or of the Supreme Court of any State, or of any other court of any State from which at the establishment of the Commonwealth an appeal lies to the Queen in Council; (iii) of the Inter-State Commission, but as to questions of law only; and the judgment of the High Court in all such cases shall be final and conclusive.

But no exception or regulation prescribed by the Parliament shall prevent the High Court from hearing and determining any appeal from the Supreme Court of a State in any matter in which at the establishment of the Commonwealth an appeal lies from such Supreme Court to the Queen in Council.

Until the Parliament otherwise provides, the conditions of and restrictions on appeals to the Queen in Council from the Supreme Courts of the several States shall be applicable to appeals from them to the High Court.

— Constitution of Australia, s 73

== Section 74: Appeal to Queen in Council ==
No appeal shall be permitted to the Queen in Council from a decision of the High Court upon any question, howsoever arising, as to the limits inter se of the Constitutional powers of the Commonwealth and those of any State or States, or as to the limits inter se of the Constitutional powers of any two or more States, unless the High Court shall certify that the question is one which ought to be determined by Her Majesty in Council.

The High Court may so certify if satisfied that for any special reason the certificate should be granted, and thereupon an appeal shall lie to Her Majesty in Council on the question without further leave.

Except as provided in this section, this Constitution shall not impair any right which the Queen may be pleased to exercise by virtue of Her Royal prerogative to grant special leave of appeal from the High Court to Her Majesty in Council. The Parliament may make laws limiting the matters in which such leave may be asked, but proposed laws containing any such limitation shall be reserved by the Governor-General for Her Majesty's pleasure.

— Constitution of Australia, s 74

=== Appeals to the Privy Council ===
The issue of appeals from the High Court to the United Kingdom's Judicial Committee of the Privy Council was a significant one during the drafting of the Constitution and it continued to be significant in the years after the court's creation. The wording of section 74 of the Constitution that was put to voters in the various colonies was that there was to be no appeal to the Privy Council in any matter involving the interpretation of the Constitution or of the constitution of a state, unless it involved the interests of some other dominion. However, the British insisted on a compromise. Section 74 as ultimately enacted by the Imperial Parliament was as follows:

No appeal shall be permitted to the Queen in Council ~~in any matter involving the interpretation of this Constitution or of the Constitution of a State~~ from a decision of the High Court upon any question, howsoever arising, as to the limits inter se of the Constitutional powers of the Commonwealth and those of any State or States, or as to the limits inter se of the Constitutional powers of any two or more States, unless ~~the public interests of some part of Her Majesty's Dominions, other than the Commonwealth or a State, are involved.~~ the High Court shall certify that the question is one which ought to be determined by Her Majesty in Council.

The High Court may so certify if satisfied that for any special reason the certificate should be granted, and thereupon an appeal shall lie to Her Majesty in Council on the question without further leave.

Except as provided in this section, this Constitution shall not impair any right which the Queen may be pleased to exercise, by virtue of Her Royal Prerogative, to grant special leave of appeal from the High Court to Her Majesty in Council. ~~But~~ The Parliament may make laws limiting the matters in which such leave may be asked, but proposed laws containing any such limitation shall be reserved by the Governor-General for Her Majesty's pleasure.

Section 74 did provide that the parliament could make laws to prevent appeals to the Privy Council and it did so, beginning in 1968, with the Privy Council (Limitation of Appeals) Act 1968, which closed off all appeals to the Privy Council in matters involving federal legislation. In 1975, the Privy Council (Appeals from the High Court) Act 1975 was passed, which had the effect of closing all routes of appeal from the High Court. Appeals from the High Court to the Privy Council are now only theoretically possible in inter se matters if the High Court grants a certificate of appeal under section 74 of the Constitution. In 1985, the High Court unanimously observed that the power to grant such a certificate "has long since been spent" and is "obsolete". In 1986, with the passing of the Australia Act by both the UK Parliament and the Commonwealth Parliament (with the request and consent of the Australian states, in accordance with Section 51(xxxviii)), appeals to the Privy Council from state supreme courts were closed off, leaving the High Court as the only avenue of appeal.

== Section 75: Original jurisdiction of High Court ==
In all matters:

(i) arising under any treaty; (ii) affecting consuls or other representatives of other countries; (iii) in which the Commonwealth, or a person suing or being sued on behalf of the Commonwealth, is a party; (iv) between States, or between residents of different States, or between a State and a resident of another State; (v) in which a writ of Mandamus or prohibition or an injunction is sought against an officer of the Commonwealth;

the High Court shall have original jurisdiction.

— Constitution of Australia, s 75

== Section 76: Additional original jurisdiction ==
The Parliament may make laws conferring original jurisdiction on the High Court in any matter:

(i) arising under this Constitution, or involving its interpretation; (ii) arising under any laws made by the Parliament; (iii) of Admiralty and maritime jurisdiction;

(iv) relating to the same subject-matter claimed under the laws of different States.

— Constitution of Australia, s 76

== Section 77: Power to define jurisdiction ==
With respect to any of the matters mentioned in the last two sections the Parliament may make laws:

(i) defining the jurisdiction of any federal court other than the High Court; (ii) defining the extent to which the jurisdiction of any federal court shall be exclusive of that which belongs to or is invested in the courts of the States;

(iii) investing any court of a State with federal jurisdiction.

— Constitution of Australia, s 77

== Section 78: Proceedings against Commonwealth or State ==
The Parliament may make laws conferring rights to proceed against the Commonwealth or a State in respect of matters within the limits of the judicial power.

— Constitution of Australia, s 78

== Section 79: Number of judges ==
The federal jurisdiction of any court may be exercised by such number of judges as the Parliament prescribes.

— Constitution of Australia, s 79

== Section 80: Trial by jury ==
The trial on indictment of any offence against any law of the Commonwealth shall be by jury, and every such trial shall be held in the State where the offence was committed, and if the offence was not committed within any State the trial shall be held at such place or places as the Parliament prescribes.

— Constitution of Australia, s 80

== List of Chapter III courts ==
- High Court of Australia
- Federal Court of Australia
- Federal Circuit and Family Court of Australia

== See also ==
- Separation of powers
- Australian court hierarchy
- Judiciary of Australia
- Article I and Article III tribunals—analogous feature of the US federal court system
