= List of law reports in Australia =

Law reports covering the decisions of Australian Courts are collections of decisions by particulars courts, subjects or jurisdictions. A widely used guide to case citation in Australia is the Australian Guide to Legal Citation, published jointly by the Melbourne University Law Review and the Melbourne Journal of International Law.

Court / subject	Report	citation	Years	Online	comment
High Court	Commonwealth Law Reports	CLR	1903-	Thomson Reuters	Authorised report for High Court. Contains most but not all judgments of the High Court and of the Privy Council on appeal from the High Court.
High Court	Commonwealth Law Reports	CLR	1903-1959	Vols 1-100: High Court Vols 1-100: BarNet JADE	Volumes 1 to 100 digitised by the High Court in the OpenLaw 1 to 100 project.
High Court	Australian Law Journal Reports	ALJR	1927-	Thomson Reuters 2002-	High Court and Privy Council decisions. Contains some decisions not reported in the Commonwealth Law Reports
High Court	Neutral citation	HCA	1903-	AustLII BarNet JADE	
Federal Court	Federal Court Reports	FCR	1984-	Thomson Reuters	Authorised report.
Federal Court	Neutral citation	FCA	1977-	AustLII BarNet JADE	Includes Full Court decisions 1977-2001
Federal Court	Neutral citation	FCAFC	2002-	AustLII BarNet JADE	Earlier Full Court decisions are available as part of the FCA Series
Federal Circuit Court of Australia	Neutral citation	FCCA	2013-	AustLII BarNet JADE	
Federal Magistrates Court of Australia	Neutral citation	FMCA	2000-2013	AustLII BarNet JADE	Family law decisions are in the FMCAfam series
Family Court of Australia	Neutral citation	FamCA	1976-	AustLII BarNet JADE	
Family Court of Australia	Neutral citation	FamCAFC	2008-	AustLII BarNet JADE	Earlier Full Court decisions are available as part of the FamCA Series
Federal Magistrates Court of Australia, family law decisions	Neutral citation	FMCAfam	2000-2013	AustLII BarNet JADE	General law decisions are in the FMCA series
Family law	Family Law Cases	FLC	1976-	CCH	Selected Australian family law decisions of the High Court of Australia, Family Court of Australia, Federal Circuit Court, Family Court of Western Australia and State and Territory Supreme Courts
Family law	Family Law Reports	Fam LR	1961-	Lexis Nexis	Selected family law decisions from the High Court, Family Courts and State Supreme Courts and Federal Magistrates Court
Federal law	Australian Law Reports	ALR		Lexis Nexis	Selected decisions of the High Court of Australia, Federal Court of Australia and the Supreme Courts of the states and territories exercising federal jurisdiction
Federal law	Federal Law Reports	FLR	1961-	Thomson Reuters	Selected decisions from State and Territory Supreme Courts exercising Federal jurisdiction, the Family Court of Australia, the Federal Magistrates Court and Federal tribunals
Corporations Law	Australian Company Law Cases	ACLC	1990-	CCH	Selected decisions of the High Court, Federal Court, State and Territory Supreme Courts, and decisions of the Takeovers Panel
Corporations Law	Australian Corporations and Securities Reports	ACSR	1989-	Lexis Nexis	Selected decisions of the High Court, Federal Court, State and Territory Supreme Courts
Corporations Law	Australian Company Law Reports	ACLR	1974-1989	Lexis Nexis	Selected decisions of the High Court, Federal Court, State and Territory Supreme Courts
Criminal law	Australian Criminal Reports	A Crim R	1979-	Thomson Reuters	Selected decisions on criminal law by the High Court of Australia, Federal Court of Australia and the Supreme Courts of the states and territories
Industrial law	Commonwealth Arbitration Reports	CAR	1905-1993	AustLII	Arbitration decisions of the Commonwealth Court of Conciliation and Arbitration and the Commonwealth Conciliation and Arbitration Commission
Industrial law	Industrial Reports	IR	1981	Thomson Reuters	Selected decisions of the High Court, Federal Court, State and Territory Supreme Courts, and Federal and State Industrial Courts and Tribunals
Administrative law	Administrative Law Decisions	ALD	1976-	Lexis Nexis	Selected decisions of the High Court, Federal Court, State and Territory Supreme Courts and administrative tribunals
Taxation law	Australian Tax Reports	ATR	1969-	WestLaw (Thomson Reuters)	
Taxation law	Australasian Tax Reports	ATR	1970-1990	Butterworths	
Property law	Australian & New Zealand Conveyancing Reports	ANZ Conv R	1979–2008	CCH	
Property law	NSW Conveyancing Reports	NSW Conv R	1980–2008	CCH	
Property law	Butterworths Property Reports	BPR	1971-	Butterworths	
Supreme Court (ACT)	ACT Law Reports	ACTLR	2008-	Thomson Reuters	Authorised report.
Supreme Court (ACT)	Australian Capital Territory Reports	ACTR	1973-	Lexis Nexis	
Supreme Court (ACT)	Neutral citation	ACTSC	1986-	AustLII BarNet JADE	
Supreme Court (NSW)	NSW Law Reports	NSWLR	1970-	New South Wales Law Reports	Authorised report. Includes NSW Court of Appeal and NSW Court of Criminal Appeal
Supreme Court (NSW)	NSW Reports	NSWR	1960-1970	New South Wales Law Reports	Authorised report. Includes NSW Court of Appeal and NSW Court of Criminal Appeal
Supreme Court (NSW)	State Reports NSW	SR NSW	1901-1970	New South Wales Law Reports	
Supreme Court (NSW)	State Reports NSW	SR NSW	1901-1950	via AustLII	
Supreme Court (NSW)	Law Reports (NSW)	LR (NSW)	1856–1900	via AustLII	
Supreme Court (NSW)	Weekly Notes (New South Wales)	WN (NSW)	1884–1987		
Supreme Court (NSW)	Neutral citation	NSWSC	1995-	caselaw.nsw.gov.au AustLII BarNet JADE	Decisions of judges sitting alone
Supreme Court (NSW)	Neutral citation	NSWCA	1988 -	caselaw.nsw.gov.au AustLII BarNet JADE	Court of Appeal
Supreme Court (NSW)	Neutral citation	NSWCCA	1994-	caselaw.nsw.gov.au AustLII BarNet JADE	Court of Criminal Appeal
Supreme Court (NSW)	Neutral citation	NSWSupC	1788-1899	via AustLII	Decisions of Superior Courts of NSW, includes Court of Civil Jurisdiction (1788-1814) & Supreme Court of Civil Judicature (1814-1823)
Supreme Court (NT)	Northern Territory Law Reports	NTLR	1991-	Thomson Reuters	Authorised report
Supreme Court (NT)	Neutral citation	NTSC	1986-	AustLII BarNet JADE	
Supreme Court (Qld)	Queensland Reports	Qd R	1958-2019	Lexis Nexis 1974- Queensland Judgments	Authorised report.
Supreme Court (Qld)	Queensland Reports	QR	2020-	Lexis Nexis 1974- Queensland Judgments	Authorised report.
Supreme Court (Qld)	State Reports Queensland	St R Qd	1902-57	Thomson Reuters	
Supreme Court (Qld)	Neutral citation	QSC	1994-	AustLII BarNet JADE	
Supreme Court (Qld)	Neutral citation	QCA	1992-	AustLII BarNet JADE	Court of Appeal
Supreme Court (SA)	South Australian State Reports	SASR	1971-	Thomson Reuters	Authorised report.
Supreme Court (SA)	State Reports. South Australia	SASR	1920-71	Thomson Reuters	
Supreme Court (SA)	State Reports. South Australia	SASR	1920-1950	via AustLII	
Supreme Court (SA)	South Australian Law Reports	SALR	1863-1920	via AustLII	
Supreme Court (SA)	Neutral citation	SASC	1989-	AustLII BarNet JADE	
Supreme Court (SA)	Neutral citation	SASCFC	2010-	AustLII BarNet JADE	Court of Criminal Appeal and Full Court of the Supreme Court
Supreme Court (Tas)	Tasmanian Reports	Tas R	1978-	Thomson Reuters	Authorised report.
Supreme Court (Tas)	Tasmanian Reports	Tas R	1978-1991	AustLII	
Supreme Court (Tas)	Tasmanian State Reports	Tas SR	1941-1978	AustLII	
Supreme Court (Tas)	Tasmanian Law Reports	TLR	1897-1940	AustLII	
Supreme Court (Tas)	Neutral citation	TASSC	1995-	AustLII BarNet JADE	Decisions of judges sitting alone
Supreme Court (Tas)	Neutral citation	TASFC	2010 -	AustLII BarNet JADE	Full Court
Supreme Court (Tas)	Neutral citation	TASCCA	2010-	AustLII BarNet JADE	Court of Criminal Appeal
Supreme Court (Tas)	Neutral citation	TASSupC	1824-1843	via AustLII	Decisions of Superior Courts of Tasmania
Supreme Court (Vic)	Victorian Reports	VR	1953-	Little William Bourke Thomson Reuters	Authorised report.
Supreme Court (Vic)	Victorian Reports	VR	1953-1996	via AustLII	
Supreme Court (Vic)	Victorian Law Reports	VLR	1875-1956	Little William Bourke via AustLII	
Supreme Court (Vic)	Neutral citation	VSC	1994-	AustLII BarNet JADE	
Supreme Court (Vic)	Neutral citation	VSCA	1998 -	AustLII BarNet JADE	Court of Appeal
Supreme Court (WA)	Western Australian Reports	WAR	1961-	Thomson Reuters	Authorised report.
Supreme Court (WA)	Western Australian Law Reports	WALR	1899-1959	via AustLII	
Supreme Court (WA)	Neutral citation	WASC	1996-	AustLII BarNet JADE	
Supreme Court (WA)	Neutral citation	WASCA	1998 -	AustLII BarNet JADE	Court of Appeal
Digests	Australian Legal Monthly Digest	ALMD	1967-1993		Summaries of significant reported decisions and recent legislative developments
