= Barley Marketing Board (NSW) v Norman =

Judgement of the High Court of Australia

- Court: High Court of Australia
- Decided: 27 November 1990
- Citations: [1990] HCA 50, (1990) 171 CLR 182

Court membership
- Judges sitting: Mason CJ, Brennan, Deane, Dawson, Toohey, Gaudron and McHugh JJ

Case opinions
- (7:0) (per Mason CJ, Brennan, Deane, Dawson, Gaudron & McHugh JJ)

Barley Marketing Board (NSW) v Norman is a High Court of Australia case that deals with the question of whether State-run marketing boards are permissible under Section 92 of the Constitution of Australia, which deals with the freedom of interstate trade and commerce.

== Background ==
By a proclamation under the Marketing of Primary Products Act 1983 (NSW), all barley grown in New South Wales would become the property of the Barley Marketing Board, and all contracts relating to the sale of barley would become void. Norman was a barley grower and he contracted to sell his barley to a buyer in Victoria.

== Decision ==
The judges, Mason CJ, Brennan, Deane, Dawson, Toohey, Gaudron and McHugh JJ, who wrote a joint judgment, acknowledged that in the past, marketing schemes often came into conflict with section 92, as they interfered with interstate trade and commerce. This included schemes that imposed quotas on sales, or schemes whereby all the commodity grown in the State became the property of the marketing board. A way around this problem was to exclude interstate trade, expressly or by reading down the legislation.

However, in this case, the Court was open to reconsider the issue, as the previous cases relied on the discredited "individual rights" theory of section 92. This theory, which guaranteed the right of the individual to engage in interstate trade and commerce, was replaced in Cole v Whitfield, by a test involving consideration of discrimination and protectionism.

Applying the test from Cole v Whitfield, the Court found that there was no discrimination. A person, from New South Wales or from outside the State, who wants to buy barley must purchase it from the marketing board, and thus there was no discrimination. A buyer in New South Wales has no competitive advantage to a buyer from Victoria, as they have equal access to the markets in both States.

The Court distinguished this case from other cases where the marketing scheme took in all the commodity grown within the State as well as the commodity entering the State. The Court also emphasised a passage from Cole v Whitfield, in that it cannot be said that there is discrimination where the commodities and services affected by the restriction are not the ones affected by discrimination.

== See also ==
- Australian constitutional law
