= Bath v Alston Holdings Pty Ltd =

Judgement of the High Court of Australia

- Court: High Court of Australia
- Decided: 7 June 1988
- Citations: [1988] HCA 27, (1988) 165 CLR 411

Court membership
- Judges sitting: Mason CJ, Wilson, Brennan, Deane, Dawson, Toohey and Gaudron JJ

Case opinions
- (4:3) The retail fee in question was found to be discriminatory and protectionist in relation to interstate trade (per Mason CJ, Brennan, Deane & Dawson JJ; Wilson, Toohey & Dawson JJ dissenting)

Bath v Alston Holdings Pty Ltd, is a High Court of Australia case that discusses the application of the freedom of interstate trade, as specified in Section 92 of the Constitution of Australia. This case followed the unanimous decision of Cole v Whitfield, regarding the interpretation of section 92 as about free trade as opposed to individual rights.

== Background ==
The Business Franchise (Tobacco) Act 1974 (Vic) imposed a licensing scheme for the sale of tobacco. For retailers, the fee was composed of a flat fee and an amount equal to 25% of the value of the tobacco sold in the previous twelve months. The Act also made for the provision of wholesalers, and tobacco bought by retailers from Victorian wholesalers would not be taken into account for the assessment of the retailer fee. This was ostensibly to avoid double-taxing the tobacco sold.

The defendant, Alston Holdings Pty Ltd, was a tobacco retailer in Victoria, who imported tobacco from Queensland for sale in Victoria, but did so without a licence. The defendant sought to challenge the Act on section 92 grounds.

== Decision ==
The unanimous decision in Cole v Whitfield, soothed the confused waters with regards to section 92 of the Constitution. However, this decision, which came only weeks later, brought with it a split bench, but as suggested in Castlemaine Tooheys Ltd v South Australia, "The difference ... flowed more from disagreement about the appropriate perspective from which the particular legislative provisions should be viewed than from any disagreement about principle." (per Mason CJ, Brennan, Deane, Dawson and Toohey JJ).

The majority in this case found that the retail fee in this case breached section 92 in being protectionist and discriminatory. The judges viewed the retail fee in isolation, and discounted the existence of the fee on wholesalers. It was possible that other states could impose a retail fee of their own; if the interstate fee was higher, this would only serve to compound the problem, while if it were lower, this additional fee would protect Victorian wholesalers from more competitive interstate wholesalers. Even if this tax were imposed in the pursuit of economic equalisation, the most it would do is to "provide some local justification for the imposition of a protectionist tax in respect of interstate goods at the later retail stage of distribution" (per majority).

The judges emphasised that a tax upon retailers, in order to be consistent with section 92, must apply equally to interstate and local goods sold. Thus, the question to be asked is whether the tax is imposed "on all transactions of the relevant kind without differentiation based on the source or destination of the goods", and if the tax refers to a particular market, the material factor is the effect of the tax on transactions in that particular market.

The minority in this case felt that while it was discriminatory, it was not protectionist in nature and that the arguments presented above only had a "superficial plausibility". The scheme was viewed as structured as it is for convenience of collection of the fee, as there were fewer wholesalers than retailers. The minority noted that if the Act were structured such that the collections occurred wholly at the retail level, the economic impact would be identical - the only difference being that the tax would be more difficult to collect.

== See also ==
- Australian constitutional law
