= Nationwide News Pty Ltd v Wills =

1992 High Court of Australia case

- Court: High Court of Australia
- Full case name: Nationwide News Pty Ltd v Wills
- Decided: 30 September 1992
- Citations: [1992] HCA 46, (1992) 177 CLR 1

Case history
- Prior action: none
- Subsequent action: none

Court membership
- Judges sitting: Mason CJ, Brennan, Deane, Dawson, Toohey, Gaudron and McHugh JJ

Case opinions
- (7:0) The law in question was held to be invalid (per Mason CJ, Brennan, Deane, Dawson, Toohey, Gaudron & McHugh JJ)

Nationwide News Pty Ltd v Wills is a High Court of Australia case that deals with a number of issues regarding the Australian Constitution, including the Express right free interstate trade and commerce (section 92), the implied freedom of political communication, and the role of proportionality.

== Background ==
The Industrial Relations Act 1988 (Cth) made it an offence to bring the Australian Industrial Relations Commission into disrepute. Nationwide News published an article attacking the integrity and independence of the commission.

Nationwide News argued that the Act infringed the implied freedom of political communications, while the Commonwealth argued that the Act was valid under section 51(xxxv) (conciliation and arbitration power), as well as section 51(xxxix) (express incidental power).

== Decision ==
=== Interstate intercourse ===
Although it was not a decisive factor, it was argued that freedom of communication falls under freedom of interstate intercourse.

Per Brennan J, the protection in section 92 is given to such things as the movement of people, goods and communications. The essential ingredient is that there is movement across State boundaries, although the movement need not be perceivable. A test can be specified as follows:

- Is there a burden on interstate intercourse?
- What is the purpose of the law? If the purpose of the law is to hinder interstate intercourse, then the law is invalid.
- If not, is there another purpose to the law? If so, is the burden on interstate trade and commerce appropriate and adapted to that purpose?

=== Implied freedom of political communication ===
Brennan, Deane, Toohey and Gaudron JJ thought that it was within the conciliation head of power, but that it infringed the implied freedom of political communication. Mason CJ, McHugh and Dawson JJ, however, held that it was outside the head of power.

=== Proportionality ===
Nationwide News is a key case where the concept of proportionality was discussed. Proportionality in this context is the idea that there should be a reasonable relationship between an end and the means used to achieve that end. It has been used for:

- Determining if a law has breached constitutional guarantees.
- Purposive powers, if there is a reasonable relationship between the law and the purpose used to achieve it.
- Non-purposive powers, if there is a sufficient connection to a head of power to fall within its implied incidental power.

Dawson J rejects the proportionality test as suggested by Mason CJ, arguing that it should be a test of sufficient connection, and not proportionality.

== See also ==
- Australian constitutional law
- Australian Capital Television Pty Ltd v Commonwealth
