= Williams v The Queen =

- Court: High Court of Australia
- Full case name: Williams v The Queen
- Decided: 26 August 1987
- Citation: [1986] HCA 88

Case history
- Prior actions: Hobart, 1986, March 5, 6; Adelaide, 1987, August 26. 26:8:1987 APPEAL from the Supreme Court of Tasmania

Court membership
- Judges sitting: Gibbs CJ, Mason, Wilson, Brennan, and Dawson JJ

Case opinions
- Arrest – Arrested person to be taken before a justice as soon as practicable – Delay – Desire of arresting officer to question arrested person.

Williams v The Queen was a decision handed down by the High Court of Australia on 26 August 1987, concerning the common law right to personal liberty.

The applicant, Williams, was indicted before the Supreme Court of Tasmania on 29 charges—15 of burglary and 14 of stealing. At the commencement of the trial, counsel for Williams objected to the admission in evidence of a number of records of interview containing confessions allegedly made to the police by Williams. He argued that Williams had been detained unlawfully, because he ought to have been brought before a judge and formally charged as soon as reasonably practicable after his arrest. Instead, he was detained in police custody for 28 hours, and questioned about his role in a variety of burglaries across northern Tasmania. After a voir dire, the trial judge ruled that the records of interview which related to 26 of the charges should not be admitted in evidence, because they were obtained unlawfully through Williams' extended detention. As a result, the trial proceeded with no evidence being tendered by the prosecution in respect of those 26 charges, and the jury was directed to return a verdict of not guilty. Williams pleaded guilty to the remaining three charges.

The Attorney-General for Tasmania appealed to the Tasmanian Court of Criminal Appeal against the applicant's acquittal on the 26 charges. The Court upheld the appeal, and ordered that Williams must be re-tried on the 26 charges. Williams then appealed to the High Court.

The High Court unanimously (5:0) upheld Williams' appeal, finding that, in the absence of a clear statutory power, the police could not detain Williams for longer than it took to take him before a judge, and could not detain him solely for the purpose of questioning him. The purpose of detention in police custody was purely to take an accused before a judge, once the police were reasonably certain a crime had been committed.

Chief Justice Gibbs said:

The critical question is whether the arrested person was detained longer than was reasonably necessary to enable him to be brought before a justice. If he is detained for the purpose of enabling him to be brought before a justice, the fact that he is questioned, whether about the offence for which he was arrested, or about other offences, will not necessarily mean that there has been a failure to bring him before a justice as quickly as was reasonably practicable. On the other hand, if he is detained, not for that purpose, but solely for the purpose of questioning him, the detention will be unlawful. The line may be a fine one, as it often is when a discretion has to be exercised in sensitive matters.

Justices Mason and Brennan said:

The right to personal liberty is, as Fullagar J described it, "the most elementary and important of all common law rights" (Trobridge v Hardy (1955) 94 CLR 147, at p. 152). Personal liberty was held by Blackstone to be an absolute right vested in the individual by the immutable laws of nature and had never been abridged by the laws of England "without sufficient cause" (Commentaries on the Laws of England (Oxford), Bk.1, pp. 120–121, 130–131)... The right to personal liberty cannot be impaired or taken away without lawful authority and then only to the extent and for the time which the law prescribes.

Justices Wilson and Dawson said:

A person is not to be imprisoned otherwise than upon the authority of a justice or a court except to the extent reasonably necessary to bring him before the justice to be dealt with according to law. That, as we conceive it, it one of the foundations of the common law.

As a result, the decision of the Tasmanian Court of Criminal Appeal was set aside, and the verdict of acquittal on the 26 charges was restored.

There is an onus on a person under Section 34A(1) of the Justices Act 1959 Tasmania, to be brought before a justice as soon as practical once taken into custody for an offence. In the ordinary case of an arrest on suspicion, the arresting officer must have satisfied himself at the time of the arrest that there are reasonable grounds for suspecting the guilt of the person arrested although the grounds of suspicion need not consist of admissible evidence. If the arresting officer believes the information in his possession to be true, if the information reasonably points to the guilt of the arrested person and if the arresting officer thus believes that the arrested person is so likely to be guilty of the offence for which he has been arrested that on general grounds of justice a charge is warranted, he has reasonable and probable cause for commencing a prosecution.
