= Dietrich v The Queen =

1992 Australian High Court legal aid case

- Court: High Court of Australia
- Full case name: Dietrich v The Queen
- Decided: 13 November 1992
- Citations: [1992] HCA 57, 177 CLR 292

Case history
- Prior actions: R v Dietrich Supreme Court of Victoria (Court of Criminal Appeal), (unreported, Justices: Norman J. O'Bryan, Peter R. A. Gray and Frank H. R. Vincent) 1988

Court membership
- Judges sitting: Chief Justice: Anthony F. Mason Justices: Francis G. Brennan, William P. Deane, Daryl M. Dawson, John L. Toohey, Mary G. Gaudron and Michael H. McHugh.

Case opinions
- (5:2) where an accused faces serious charges and is (through no fault of their own) not able to obtain representation, any application for adjournment or stay should be granted (unless there are exceptional circumstances) and the trial delayed until such representation can be obtained (5:2) if in such circumstances the seeking of adjournment or stay is denied, resulting in an unfair trial, the conviction must be overturned (per Chief Justice Anthony Mason and Justices William Deane, John Toohey, Mary Gaudron & Michael McHugh)

Dietrich v The Queen is a 1992 High Court of Australia constitutional case which established that a person accused of serious criminal charges must be granted an adjournment until appropriate legal representation is provided if they are unrepresented through no fault of their own and proceeding would result in the trial being unfair.

Until the 5–2 opinion of Dietrich v The Queen, it was customary for those unable to afford legal representation to be forced to represent themselves at trial, even when facing serious criminal charges. Previous High Court rulings found representation preferable but not a requisite for a fair trial.

The case originated in the County Court of Victoria, where Olaf Dietrich, later known as Hugo Rich, had been convicted of importing a trafficable quantity of heroin. Prior to trial, Dietrich had applied for legal assistance through several avenues, all of which were rejected. The Victorian Court of Criminal Appeal rejected the appeal and the matter was escalated to the High Court of Australia. Counsel for Dietrich applied for appeal on one ground; Dietrich's lack of legal representation meant the trial in the County Court of Victoria was quashed and a new trial ordered.

== Background ==
=== Legal ===
The High Court of Australia (High Court) is the most senior court in the Australian legal system. In 1979, the High Court confirmed when a criminal conviction should be set aside if the person convicted had no legal representation during their trial.

This decision was named McInnis v The Queen, where a person was accused of several serious criminal charges. Unable to afford his own legal representation, the accused applied for legal aid, which was ultimately refused. He was then refused a suspension of the trial, known as an adjournment, and ultimately sentenced to a term of imprisonment. The accused then requested for the High Court to hear an appeal on the ground that refusing to adjourn the trial meant he was unable to obtain legal representation, with this causing such prejudice that it constituted a miscarriage of justice.

In a 4–1 decision, the High Court ruled that, while it was preferable for those accused of serious criminal charges to be represented, it was not a legal right and so there had been no miscarriage of justice. Dietrich v The Queen was seen by some as an opportunity for McInnis v The Queen to be overturned and the High Court to set a precedent (a decision lower courts would be required to follow) for the right to legal representation.

=== Case ===
Olaf Dietrich was born in a German refugee camp in 1952 and migrated to Australia at age nine. He left school as a teenager to work in retail. He married at 18 and had a daughter. By the time Dietrich v The Queen was decided, Dietrich had already served his sentence and had been released from prison on parole in July 1990, when he changed his name to Hugo Rich.

Dietrich conspired with his friend Gregory Middap to import narcotics from Thailand to Australia. Dietrich flew to Melbourne from Bangkok, Thailand, on 17 December 1986 carrying heroin he had internally concealed. Middap had informed the Australian Federal Police Dietrich was carrying drugs but the AFP did not find the drugs due to the internal concealment. After recovering most of the importation, Middap again informed on Dietrich, who was arrested and taken to Pentridge Prison hospital, where the remaining heroin was passed.

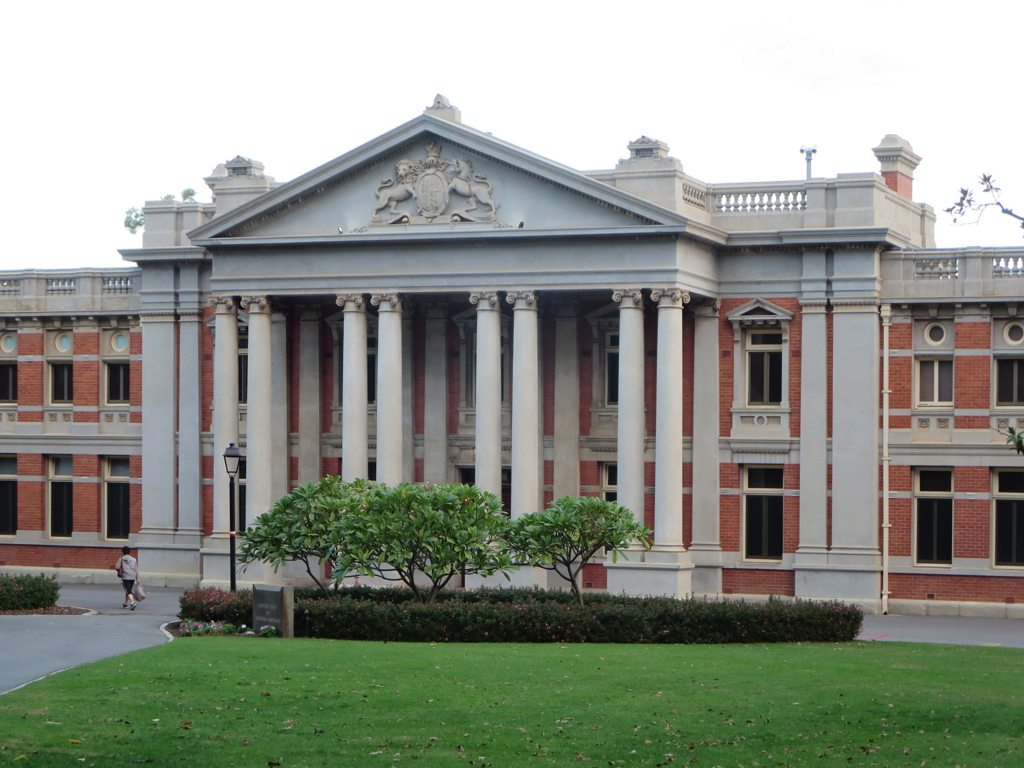
The Supreme Court of Western Australia, where McInnis v The Queen originated

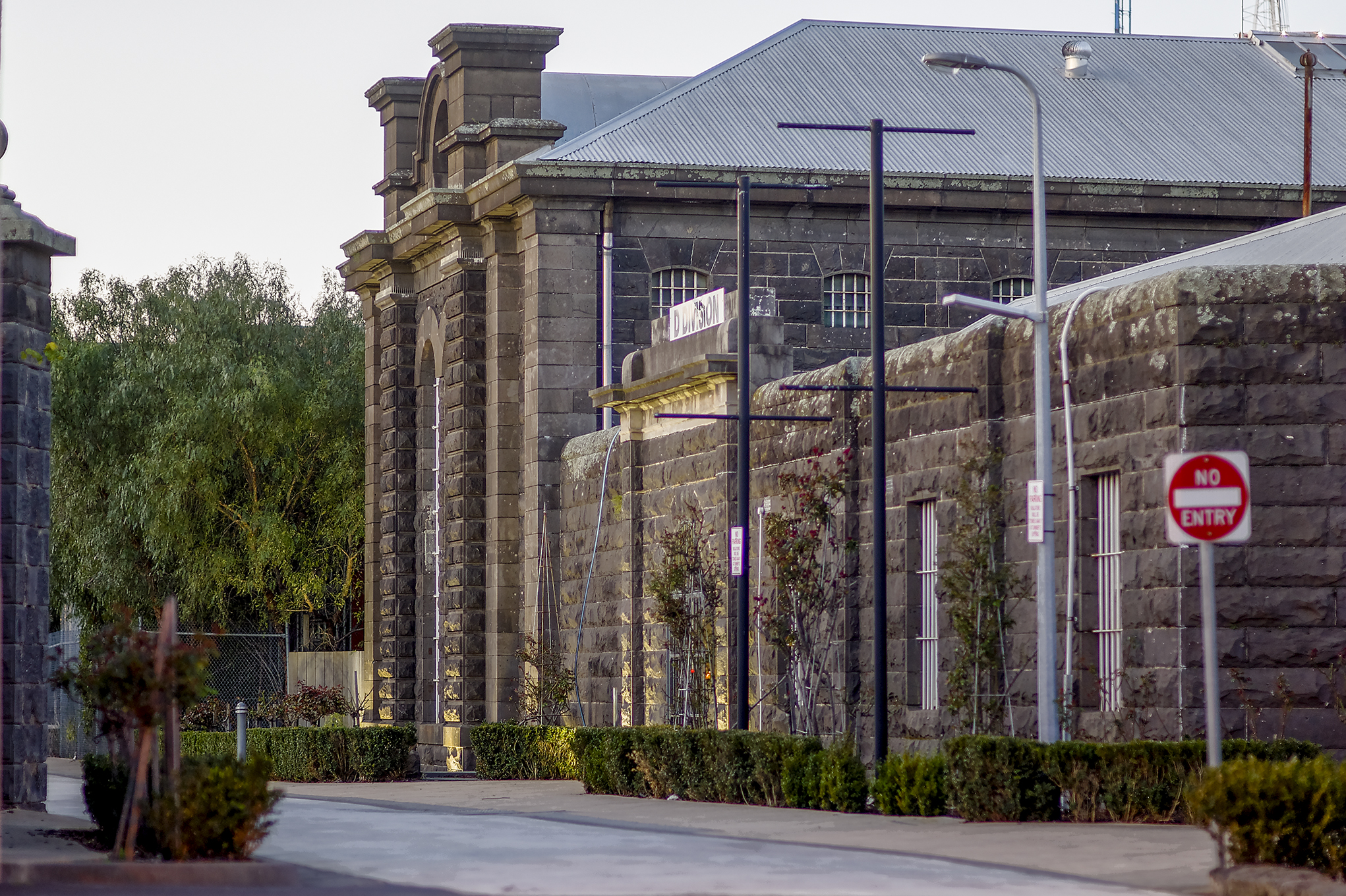
Pentridge Prison, where Dietrich was taken following arrest

Dietrich was charged and sent to trial for the importation in the County Court of Victoria. He applied for publicly funded legal representation, which was refused. Dietrich was hence unrepresented at trial. Dietrich pled not guilty, but a jury found him guilty of one count of importing a trafficable amount of heroin into Australia.

Following the trial, Dietrich was sentenced to a term of seven years imprisonment. He then appealed to the Court of Criminal Appeal, arguing those facing serious criminal charges should be provided with legal representation where unable to afford it; failure for a court to provide such legal representation means a subsequent conviction constitutes a miscarriage of justice. The court refused to hear Dietrich's appeal.

== Appeal to the High Court ==
Dietrich appealed to the High Court on the grounds the Court of Appeal erred in law by holding Dietrich did not have a right to be provided with counsel at public expense. It was argued that not granting adjournment meant a miscarriage of justice had occurred, by refusing publicly funded legal representation meaning he proceeded to trial representing himself.

=== Right to representation ===
International Covenant on Civil and Political Rights

Dietrich asserted a right to counsel on three sources of law. The appeal cited section 397 of the Crimes Act 1958 which, though now repealed, at the time said "every accused person shall be admitted after the close of the case for the prosecution to make full answer and defence thereto by legal counsel".

The appeal also referred to Australia's international obligations, specifically Article 14(3) of the International Covenant on Civil and Political Rights (ICCPR), which says a person must have the right to legal assistance without payment in a case where the interests of justice so require and one does not have the means to pay. Counsel for Dietrich accepted the ICCPR did not form part of domestic law but argued the common law ought be developed to enforce rights provided for in "international instruments to which Australia is a party".

Counsel for Dietrich also cited analogous cases providing a right to counsel in the United States and Canada, both of which are common-law countries. The US Sixth Amendment was interpreted by the US Supreme Court in Powell v. Alabama (1932) to hold courts must provide counsel to defendants in capital cases where capital punishment is a possible sentence for a defendant who is unable to afford their own representation. Johnson v. Zerbst (1938) later expanded that principle to cover federal trials. The Supreme Court in Gideon v. Wainwright (1963) then held under the Fourteenth Amendment the principle also applied to state courts.

=== Miscarriage of justice ===
Secondary to the argument for right to counsel was the assertion the originating judge should have adjourned the matter until Dietrich was able to provide legal representation, and the failure to do so caused a miscarriage of justice.

== High Court judgment ==
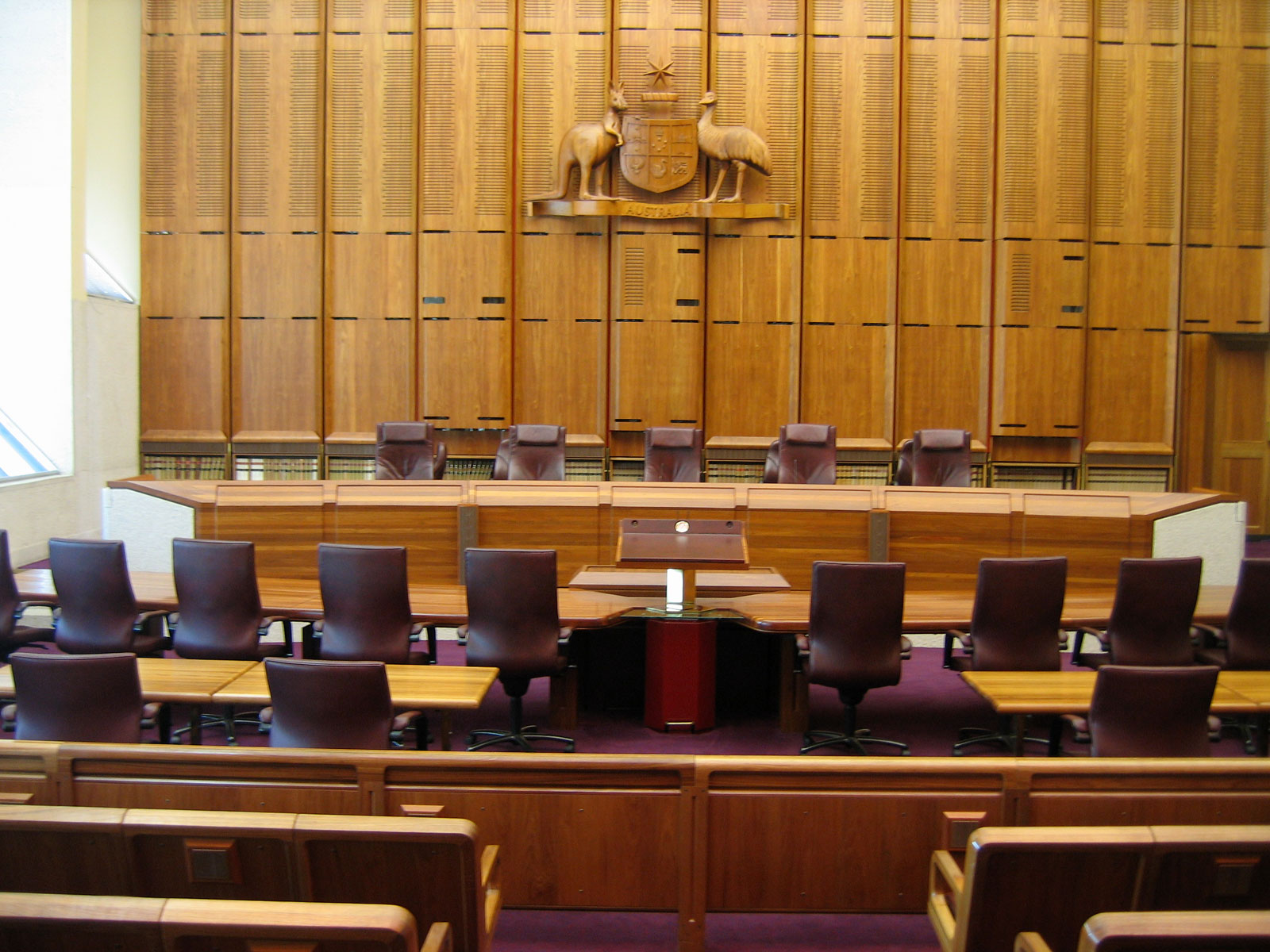
The High Court of Australia

The High Court majority found an accused has the right to a fair trial, and that courts have power to adjourn a matter where necessary to ensure this right is met. Past cases show the trial of an unrepresented person accused of a serious offence will result in an unfair trial.

On the first ground, regarding the arguments made by Dietrich on his right to representation, the High Court considered the decision of Ibrahim v The Queen, where it had also been submitted section 397 provides a right to appointed representation. The court also considered cases decided in Canadian courts, specifically R v Johnson, Re Ewing and Kearney and the Queen, and Barrette v R, which had considered a statutory provision similarly worded to that of section 397. The court found this section meant a person is entitled to be represented because a court cannot actively deny representation but rejected the right to have such representation provided by the state.

In rejecting the second submission, the court noted such an approach is useful in interpreting legislation to resolve ambiguity but said to apply it in this circumstance would be to "declare a right which has hitherto never been recognised should now be taken to exist".

On the third ground, the court accepted the cases cited by the defence team demonstrated United States law precluded an accused from imprisonment without access to publicly funded representation. The court also found such analogous cases did not support such an argument in Australia because these cases were decided based on the United States Constitution, which is not in the High Court of Australia's jurisdiction. In Canada, Section Ten of the Canadian Charter of Rights and Freedoms guarantees the right "to retain and instruct counsel without delay and to be informed of that right". The court examined two applicable cases presented by Dietrich, finding they did not support an argument the Charter entrenched a general right to legal representation "at public expense irrespective of the circumstances of the particular case". The court noted the differences in constitutional law between Australia, the United States and Canada but concluded Australian courts would not uphold foreign rights into Australian law without a constitutional basis.

On the secondary argument regarding miscarriage of justice, the court acknowledged the originating judge reiterated their inability to provide Dietrich with representation but seemed unaware of their authority to adjourn the trial, noting the originating judge had "overlooked the possibility of adjourning the matter" and "erred in this respect". This error was found to have resulted in an unfair trial, depriving Dietrich of a real chance of being found not guilty on all charges, given he was found guilty of only one count.

=== Majority ===
In a five to two decision, Chief Justice Mason, and Justices Deane, Toohey, Gaudron and McHugh held:

- where an accused faces serious charges, is indigent, and through no fault of their own is unable to obtain representation, any application for adjournment or stay should be granted unless there are exceptional circumstances, and the trial delayed until such representation can be obtained
- if in such circumstances the seeking of adjournment or stay is denied, resulting in an unfair trial, the conviction must be overturned.

Toohey noted the disadvantages faced by an unrepresented accused, such as having insufficient legal skills and the inability to present their case to the same level as the prosecution. Mason and McHugh represented the majority of the High Court in concluding the desirability of an accused charged with a serious offence being represented was so high trials should only proceed without representation in exceptional circumstances. Gaudron agreed, referring to the fact judges have powers to prevent unfair trials. As a result of the majority decision, the court ordered the application to appeal be granted, the conviction be quashed and Dietrich be granted a new trial. The majority dismissed the argument there was a right to counsel at public expense but accepted the right of an accused to receive a fair trial is a fundamental element of Australian criminal law. In passing, Deane and Gaudron said the right to representation was in some circumstances constitutionally guaranteed by Chapter III, which requires judicial process and fairness to be observed. Deane and Gaudron also held there is a connection between due process and a right to a fair trial, though made no comment about the nature of this connection; according to an academic, the justices regard the power and obligation of courts to prevent an unfair trial as a fundamental aspect of judicial power.

=== Dissenting ===
Justices Gerard Brennan and Daryl Dawson dissented. Dawson in his dissent acknowledged the idea of "perfect justice", that moving toward it would require anyone accused of an offence to be represented. Graeme Durie, then the Assistant Director of General Law and Policy at the Legal Aid Commission, noted Dawson recognised the interests of justice could not be pursued in an isolated case; that competing demands on public money and the limited budget for legal aid was not an issue for courts to address. Dawson noted the role of courts is to ensure as fair a trial as possible, but that a fair trial did not and could not include publicly funded representation. He also concluded no miscarriage of justice arises due to an accused lacking legal representation, and that while challenges exist for those without representation, courts were not an appropriate means for allocating public money to provide legal aid. Brennan found no miscarriage of justice occurred merely because an accused had no legal representation, saying while without publicly funded representation, criminal justice may not be even-handed, it was for the government and not the courts to allocate such resources.

== Consequences ==
=== Dietrich's later life ===
In 1995, having changed his name to Hugo Rich, Dietrich was convicted of three armed robberies and sentenced to 13 years in jail. After his release in October 2004, he again faced court for firearms charges and later for the murder of security guard Erwin Kastenberger during an armed robbery in Blackburn North on 8 March 2005. Dietrich shot Kastenberger for reasons Justice Lasry, who presided over the case, said were unclear, noting Dietrich's "appalling history" of more than 80 criminal convictions. Lasry stated the court considered Dietrich irredeemable and without prospect of rehabilitation. In the Supreme Court of Victoria on 12 June 2009, Dietrich was found guilty of the murder of Kastenberger, and was jailed for life with a non-parole period of 30 years. In 2014, the Court of Appeal dismissed his appeal.

=== Implications for provision of legal aid ===
Dietrich v The Queen does not necessarily mean the state must provide defence counsel but it means in cases where the accused cannot afford counsel and the crime is grave, to ensure a fair trial, a judge may be required to suspend the case until counsel is appointed. The practical result is the ability of courts to exert pressure on the government to provide the accused with legal representation, representing a careful exercise of judicial power that respects the Australian separation of powers where the High Court stopped short of directly ordering the executive to fund counsel, yet effectively compelling a fair outcome through the remedy of adjournment.

The decision was predicted to have significant impact on future trials and the way legal aid was provided. The decision was markedly different from those in past cases, prompting debate about who should receive legal aid and whether those charged with serious offences could avoid conviction in cases where legal aid was not provided. An Australian Senate committee inquiry received multiple submissions saying the decision could result in legal-aid funds being redirected from civil or family law matters to criminal cases. Dietrich v The Queen restrains the way in which governments could provide assistance, promoting those accused of serious crimes as having a de facto right to public funding while those facing less-serious matters are refused. It was argued a better approach would be to limit court intervention to the most-serious cases and for courts to assess the circumstance of each applicant.

By the late 1990s, the right to legal representation for indigent people facing serious criminal charges was said to be under threat. Provision of legal aid was hampered by budgetary decisions by the Howard government, which cut the budget for legal aid by $70 million, leading to judges adjourning serious trials. The Attorney-General asked courts to be realistic about applying principles from Dietrich v The Queen, leading to criticism of the government for interfering with the independence of the judiciary.

=== Dietrich test ===
For an accused person to succeed in applying for a stay based on the Dietrich v The Queen judgment, the applicant bears the onus of proving they are indigent, are charged with a serious offence, and cannot obtain legal representation through no fault of their own. The High Court did not define the meaning of "indigent" or establish the scope of the terms "serious offence" and "through no fault" of their own. As a result, courts have encountered problems when applying the Dietrich test.

In the years following Dietrich v The Queen, a number of questions about the meaning of indigence were raised, and few were resolved. Shortly after the decision was made, counsel for Dietrich noted several aspects of the ruling would need to be "worked out in practice", specifically the meaning of indigence. Deane said a person not liquidating personal assets to pay for representation will have no complaint at law if they are then not provided with representation at no cost. This left open the question of how future judges would assess a defendant's ability to pay for their own representation. This may mean a defendant whose only asset is their home must sell this to be considered indigent and become eligible for publicly funded representation.

The determinant for "serious offence" was suggested to be a threat of a custodial sentence. However, if the test is a threat of imprisonment without regard to the length of imprisonment, the range of offences to be considered as meeting the Dietrich test is unclear. A lack of representation may not make a trial unfair if an accused elects not to have their own legal representation or refuses legal advice.

== Contemporary application ==
Dietrich v The Queen has been considered and upheld in contemporary trials. At his trial for murder, former Melbourne underworld figure Carl Williams argued an adjournment was required because his preferred representation was unavailable. The judge referred to Dietrich v The Queen and accepted the decision confirmed the right to a fair trial, and that courts may grant an adjournment if a lack of representation might prejudice this right.

== Bibliography ==
Academic literature

- Ciro, Tony; Goldwasser, Vivien; Verma, Reeta (2014). Law and Business (4th ed.). Australia: Oxford University Press. p. 7. ISBN 9780195596939.
- Davies, Margaret (2014). "Commentary on Dietrich v R". In Heather, Douglas; Francesca, Bartlett; Trish, Luker; Hunter, Rosemary (eds.). Australian feminist judgments: righting and rewriting law. Oxford: Hart Publishing. pp. 69–74. ISBN 978-1-78225-540-6. ProQuest 2135960340.
- Durie, Graeme (1993). "Dietrich: legal aid re-defined by High Court" (PDF). Journal of the Law Society Northern Territory. 36: 12–15. ISSN 1039-1940 – via Austlii.
- Fairall, Paul (1992). "Trial without counsel: Dietrich v The Queen" (PDF). Bond Law Review. 4 (2): 234–241. doi:10.53300/001c.5226 – via Austlii.
- Fridell, Ron (2007). Gideon v. Wainwright: the right to free counsel. Tarrytown, NY: Marshall Cavendish Benchmark. ISBN 978-0-7614-2146-7. OCLC 63187523.
- Garkawe, Sam (December 1994). "Human Rights in the Administration of Justice: Dietrich v The Queen". Australian Journal of Human Rights. 1 (1): 371–379. doi:10.1080/1323238X.1994.11910920. ISSN 1323-238X.
- Gibson, Frances (May 2003). "A decade after Dietrich". Law Society Journal. 41 (4): 52–57. ISSN 1839-5287.
- Grace, David (2001). "Civil liberties under threat". University of Western Sydney Law Review. 5 (1). ISSN 1446-9294 – via Austlii.
- Groves, Mathew (2018). "The incomplete right to counsel in criminal trials". Criminal Law Journal. 42 (3). ISSN 0314-1160 – via InfoRMIT.
- Kift, Sally (1997). "The Dietrich Dilemma". Queensland University of Technology Law Journal. 13: 211–234. ISSN 1445-6249 – via Austlii.
- Kinley, David (1998). Human rights in Australian Law: principles, practice, and potential. Sydney: Federation Press. ISBN 9781862873063.
- Roche, Declan (2001). "Dietrich v The Queen". In Coper, Michael; Blackshield, Tony; Williams, George (eds.). The Oxford companion to the High Court of Australia. South Melbourne, Vic.: Oxford University Press. ISBN 9780191735189.
- Shipard, Suzanne (1995). "Fair trial and the indigent accused". Law Society Journal. 33 (10): 64–65. ISSN 1839-5287.
- Wheeler, Fiona (1997). "The Doctrine of Separation of Powers and Constitutionally Entrenched Due Process in Australia". Monash University Law Review. 23 (2): 248–284. ISSN 0311-3140 – via InfoRMIT.
- Zines, Leslie (2008). The High Court and the Constitution. Annandale: Federation Press. ISBN 9781862876910.

Legal cases

- Dietrich v The Queen [1992] HCA 57, (1992) 177 CLR 292, High Court (Australia)
- McInnis v The Queen [1979] HCA 65, (1979) 143 CLR 575, High Court (Australia)
- Rich v The Queen [2014] VSCA 126, (2020) 269, Court of Appeal (Vic, Australia)
- R v Rich [2009] VSC 515, Supreme Court (Vic, Australia)

News reports

- Butcher, Steve (12 June 2009). "Notorious criminal Hugo Rich found guilty of security guard's murder". The Sydney Morning Herald. ISSN 0312-6315. Archived from the original on 13 December 2019.
- Daly, Martin (20 February 1993). "Legal fears over bid to get around High Court". The Age. p. 3. ISSN 0312-6315 – via Newspapers.com.
- Hagan, Kate (14 November 2009). "Life in jail for killer of guard". The Sydney Morning Herald. ISSN 0312-6315.
- Hunt, Elissa (13 November 2009). "Hugo Rich gets life sentence for Kastenberger murder". The Herald Sun. ISSN 1038-3433. Archived from the original on 15 November 2009.
- Kingston, Margo (28 March 1998). "Legal aid for the poor under threat". The Sydney Morning Herald. p. 8. ISSN 1038-3433 – via Newspapers.com.
- Rule, Andrew; Silvester, John (13 November 2009). "Rich man, poor man". The Sydney Morning Herald. ISSN 0312-6315. Archived from the original on 12 June 2022.
- Silvester, Andrew (10 June 2005). "Hugo Rich chose the low road". The Age. ISSN 0312-6315. Archived from the original on 12 June 2022.

Official reports

- Implications of the Dietrich decision. Australian Senate Inquiry into the Australian Legal Aid System (Report). June 1997. Archived from the original on 10 February 2006.
