= Australian Capital Television Pty Ltd v Commonwealth =

1992 Australian High Court case

- Court: High Court of Australia
- Full case name: Australian Capital Television Pty Ltd & Ors v Commonwealth; New South Wales v Commonwealth & Anor
- Decided: 30 September 1992
- Citations: [1992] HCA 45, (1992) 177 CLR 106

Court membership
- Judges sitting: Mason CJ, Brennan, Deane, Dawson, Toohey, Gaudron & McHugh JJ

Case opinions
- (5:2) the Constitution provides for a system of responsible government, and the right to free political communication is an indispensable part of that system (per Mason CJ, Brennan, Deane, Toohey & Gaudron JJ) (4:3) part IIID of the Political Broadcasts and Political Disclosures Act 1991 (Cth) was invalid, because it contravened this implied right (per Mason CJ, Deane, Toohey & Gaudron JJ; Brennan and McHugh JJ dissenting in part)

Australian Capital Television v Commonwealth, is a decision of the High Court of Australia.

The case is notable in Australian Constitutional Law as one of the first cases within Australia's implied freedom of political communication jurisprudence.

On its facts, the case concerned the constitutional validity of Part IIID of the Political Broadcasts and Political Disclosures Act 1991, which regulated political advertising during election campaigns, and required broadcasters to broadcast political advertisements free of charge at other times. The High Court found the laws to be invalid.

== Background to the case ==
The Hawke government in 1992 introduced the Political Broadcasts and Political Disclosures Act 1991, which notably prohibited the broadcasting of politically related material on electronic media such as radio and television during the period leading up to a State or Federal election (except in news, current affairs or talkback programs). The laws also obliged broadcasters to provide "free time" to political parties to air advertisements. Kim Beazley, then the Minister for Transport and Communications, said that the changes were designed to limit corruption, and prevent donors to political parties from exerting undue influence, by restricting the amount of political advertising that could be broadcast. He said that due to the practical cost of advertising, it was only the major parties and very wealthy individuals who could afford to broadcast advertisements. The Government said they had wanted to avoid a situation such as that in the United States, where it is virtually impossible for anyone but the very rich to participate in the political process.

The laws generally prohibited broadcasters from airing matters on behalf of the government or agencies, and from broadcasting political advertisements. The time to be allocated for free political messaging for parties would be divided between the parties based on the amount of representation they had in the Parliament, with only five percent available to other groups, who had to apply for an allocation of free time.

Eight plaintiffs, all commercial television broadcasters, brought a challenge to the law before the High Court. They requested that the court declare Part IIID of the act to be invalid. In a related action which was heard at the same time, the Government of New South Wales also challenged the laws, particularly their application to by-elections. The Government of South Australia intervened in the case in support of the Commonwealth.

== The case ==
The plaintiffs put forth arguments that the new laws interfered with a right to free political speech under the constitution, that the laws were an 'unjust' acquisition of property, and that the laws were discriminatory against the states, and interfered with the proper business of state governments

=== Freedom of speech ===
The principal argument from the plaintiffs was that the changes to the Broadcasting Act contravened an implied right to freedom of participation and communication in political processes. They argued that this right to free political speech arose from the system of representative government which is provided by the Constitution, or alternatively, it arose from the "common citizenship of the Australian people." Sir Maurice Byers QC, who acted for the plaintiffs, paraphrasing former Justice Isaac Isaacs argued that the principle that governments are responsible to the citizens who elect them "permeates the Constitution, forming part of the fabric on which the written words of the Constitution are superimposed," and as such, all voters should be entitled to make comment on political issues.

The plaintiffs argued that since a right to free political communication was recognised in other parliamentary democracies, such as in the United States by the First Amendment to the United States Constitution, and in Canada by the Charter of Rights and Freedoms, it should be recognised in Australia. They said that because the provisions in Part IIID limited the allocation of "free time" to people or groups already represented in the Parliaments, new parties or people not in the Parliament would not be able to express their views.

The Commonwealth argued that the laws enhanced rather than diminished the electoral process, because they prevented corruption, and allowed parties which did not have large amounts of money to have access to radio and television broadcasting. They said that the Parliament has valid powers to protect the integrity of the electoral process under sections 10, 29, 31, 51(36) and 51(39) of the Constitution. Furthermore, they argued that even if there was some implied right to freedom of political communication, this could not override valid legislation. The Commonwealth also pointed out that similar laws operated in countries such as the United Kingdom, France, Norway and Sweden, and that countries such as Canada, Germany, Japan and New Zealand had a system of allocating free broadcasting time for political purposes during election periods.

The Government of South Australia, who intervened in support of the Commonwealth, said that if the framers of the Constitution had intended to include provisions for a right of free speech as in the United States Constitution, they would have done so. They said that although some freedom of communication could reasonably be implied into the Constitution, the parts of the Act in question did not have the effect of preventing "free and meaningful elections" from taking place, and so the laws were not invalid.

The High Court agreed that the new part IIID of the Broadcasting Act had the effect of limiting the freedoms previously enjoyed by citizens to publicly discuss political matters. However, the question remained as to whether there was some sort of Constitutional basis for these freedoms, or whether the Commonwealth was justified in restricting them. While the court agreed that similar laws had been put in place overseas, that did not change the fact that the laws impaired freedom of communication, and privileged those political parties or interest groups who were already represented in the Parliament. The laws would not only disadvantage candidates challenging sitting members, but would severely hinder groups such as trade unions, charities or employers' groups, who may very well have a legitimate desire to make political statements.

=== Acquisition of property ===
The plaintiffs also argued that to force broadcasters to give portions of "free time" to the represented political parties and members of parliament had the effect of taking away their right to charge money for broadcasting advertisements. They suggested that taking away their advertising time and in effect giving it to the legislators constituted an acquisition of property by the Commonwealth, which according to section 51(xxxi) of the Constitution, has to be done "on just terms."

The Commonwealth argued that the laws made no unjust acquisition of property since broadcasting licences were not immune to being modified by the Parliament. They said that it was fair and just to require broadcasters to provide a limited amount of free service in the public interest. In any event, the Commonwealth suggested that "free time" granted by the Act was not a form of property anyway, since it could not be transferred to other people, one of the essential features of any form of property.

Ultimately the court did not decide on this issue, although Justice Brennan said that he agreed with the Commonwealth's argument that the "free time" was not a form of property.

=== Interference with State rights ===
The Government of New South Wales, in addition to supporting the claims of the other plaintiffs, also argued that Part IIID of the Broadcasting Act was invalid because it interfered with the executive functions of the States, and contravened sections 106 and 107 of the Constitution which protects the individual State Constitutions. They said that to interfere with the right of State Governments to make political advertisements went far beyond any legitimate power given to the Parliament of Australia by the Constitution. They also said that in any event, the changes to the Act should not apply to by-elections.

The Commonwealth argued that Part IIID of the Act did not single out the States, nor interfere with their proper activities, since State elections were treated in exactly the same way as Federal elections were.

== The decision ==
The court decided that a right to freedom of political communication was essential to the system of representative government provided for in the Constitution. The court expressed the view that the reason why Australia does not have a bill of rights is because the framers of the Constitution believed that since Australia had a system of representative government, which gave all voters an equal share in political power, laws to protect rights were simply not necessary. To undermine the system of representative government was contrary to this trust which the people gave to the Parliaments, and was not permitted by the Constitution. Although this right is not an absolute one, it is still a right which allows for free and public political discussion.

The court also decided that the relevant laws, contained in Part IIID of the Broadcasting Act, were invalid because there was no reasonable justification for the way they restricted the freedom of political communication. The court decided that the laws also impaired certain functions of the States in terms of their rights to make political advertisements, and so the laws were also invalid for that reason.

In dissent, Justice Dawson accepted that the Constitution implied that electors must have sufficient information to make a true choice at election time. However he appreciated that 'serious difficulties have been experienced in [allocating election] broadcasting time in accordance with capacity to pay'. He concluded that, regardless of whether the means of allocating free air-time in the Act was 'ideal, it is within the ambit of parliamentary power'.

Justice Brennan, not dissimilarly, dissented because whilst accepting an implication of a freedom of political communication, he held that the legislation was tailored to address serious risks to electoral democracy. These risks were three-fold. One related to corruption, via 'covert influences' on parties through their dependency on private political donations, which risked turning 'public debate into a cloak for bartering away the public interest'. Another related to political equality, since a 'reduction in the cost of effective participation in an election campaign reduces one of the chief impediments to political democracy.' A third, if lesser risk, related to improving electoral deliberation, since Parliament could reasonably 'make an adverse assessment of the information value of television advertising [whose] brevity tends to trivialize'.

== Consequences ==
The case was one of the earliest in a series of cases in which the High Court found implied rights in the Constitution. The trend reached a high point in Theophanous v Herald & Weekly Times Ltd, which found that the implied right to freedom of political communication could be used as a defence in a defamation action. Although that is no longer the case, the limited right to freedom of communication remains. It was emphasised in later cases like Lange v ABC, that political communication was not a personal right, rather a constitutional restriction on legislative power.

In discussing the nature of representative government, Chief Justice Mason expressed the view that although the Constitution originally drew its authority from the British Imperial Parliament, it would indeed be appropriate in modern times to recognise that Australian sovereignty derives its force from the Australian people.

== See also ==
- Australian constitutional law
- Nationwide News Pty Ltd v Wills
