= Minister of State for Immigration and Ethnic Affairs v Teoh =

Judgement of the High Court of Australia

- Court: High Court of Australia
- Full case name: Minister of State for Immigration and Ethnic Affairs v Ah Hin Teoh
- Decided: 7 April 1995
- Citations: [1995] HCA 20, (1995) 183 CLR 273
- Transcripts: [1994] HCATrans 88 (24 October 1994); [1994] HCATrans 93 (25 October 1994)

Case history
- Prior actions: Teoh v Minister for Immigration, Local Government and Ethnic Affairs [1993] FCA 423, Federal Court; Teoh v Minister for Immigration and Ethnic Affairs [1994] FCA 1017, Federal Court (Full Court)

Court membership
- Judges sitting: Mason CJ, Deane, Toohey, Gaudron & McHugh JJ

Case opinions
- (4:1) There had been a breach of natural justice (per Mason CJ, Deane, Toohey and Gaudron JJ) (3:1) The ratification of an international convention can be a basis for the existence of a legitimate expectation and that, in this instance, there was a breach of procedural fairness (per Mason CJ, Deane and Toohey JJ)

Minister of State for Immigration and Ethnic Affairs v Teoh (commonly known as Teoh's case) was an Australian court case which was decided by the High Court of Australia on 7 April 1995. The case is notable for giving unprecedented significance to the ratification of international treaties by the executive government (in particular the Convention on the Rights of the Child).

== Facts and background ==
Ah Hin Teoh, a Malaysian citizen, came to Australia in May 1988 and was granted a temporary entry permit. In July 1988, Teoh married Jean Lim, an Australian citizen and the de facto spouse of Teoh's deceased brother. Mrs Teoh had four children, one from her first marriage and three from the de facto relationship. Subsequently, Mr and Mrs Teoh had three children together. In October 1988, Teoh was granted a further temporary entry permit that enabled him to remain in Australia until February 1989. Prior to the expiry of the permit, Teoh applied for a grant of resident status. In November 1990, whilst this application was being processed, Mr Teoh was convicted on charges of heroin importation and possession.

In January 1991, Teoh was notified pursuant to the Migration Act 1958 that his application for resident status had been refused on the ground that he could not meet the good character requirement as he had a criminal record. In February 1991, Teoh applied for a review of the decision, providing documentation that included a testimonial from Teoh's mother-in-law who stated that Teoh was the only person who could keep the family together.

The Immigration Review Panel rejected the review in July 1991, highlighting the seriousness of Teoh's criminal conviction. This decision was accepted by the Immigration Minister, and in February 1992 an order was made that Teoh be deported. Teoh sought a review of both the acceptance of the recommendation and the decision to deport.

In September 1993 in the Federal Court, French J dismissed the application, finding that the acceptance of the Panel's recommendation and the ordering of deportation had not been an improper exercise of power, a denial of natural justice, nor did it involve the consideration of irrelevant factors by the decision-makers.

On appeal, the full bench of the Federal Court (Black CJ, Lee and Carr JJ) found that the decision-maker's power had been improperly exercised because it had failed to make appropriate investigations into the hardship to Teoh's wife and her children were Teoh refused resident status. The full court ordered a stay of the deportation order until the decision had been reconsidered in light of the court's finding. The Immigration Minister appealed against the decision to the High Court of Australia.

== Decision ==
The majority (Mason CJ, Deane, Toohey and Gaudron JJ) agreed with the Federal Court decision that there had been a breach of natural justice, as the Immigration department had failed to invite Teoh to make a submission on whether a deportation order should be made, contrary to the Convention on the Rights of the Child, which provided that in any administrative decision concerning a child, the child's best interests must be a primary consideration.

=== Legitimate expectation ===
Mason CJ, Deane and Toohey JJ accepted as correct the finding of Carr and Lee JJ that the ratification of an international convention can be a basis for the existence of a legitimate expectation and that, in this instance, there had been a want of procedural fairness. McHugh J dissented on this point and Gaudron J did not rely upon it in her reasons.

=== Common law rights of children ===
Gaudron J, although in the majority, did not rely upon the Convention on the Rights of the Child to find in Teoh's favour. The fact that a child is an Australian citizen is enough to establish the principle that the best interests of children should be a primary consideration in the making of administrative decisions. Gaudron J held that whilst the decision-maker was not required to initiate inquiries, procedural fairness required them to inform Teoh that his children's best interests were not being taken into account as a primary consideration and offer him the opportunity to persuade them otherwise.

== Repercussions ==
The Government acted in response to the outcome in Teoh's case by taking up the High Court's statement that a legitimate expectation would not arise where there is either an executive or statutory indication to the contrary. The Minister for Foreign Affairs, Mr Downer, and the then Attorney-General, Mr Williams, issued a joint statement stating that the act of entering into a treaty does not give rise to legitimate expectations in administrative law. The statement replaced a statement made by the then Minister for Foreign Affairs and the then Attorney-General in 1995. The statement foreshadowed the introduction of legislation to address the issue. Legislation was introduced in 1997 and again in 1999. It lapsed on both occasions when Parliament was dissolved for the holding of elections.

== See also ==
- Australian administrative law
