= Cole v Whitfield =

Australian constitutional law case

- Court: High Court of Australia
- Decided: 2 May 1988
- Citations: [1988] HCA 18, (1988) 165 CLR 360

Case history
- Prior action: Court of Petty Sessions (Tas) September 1986

Court membership
- Judges sitting: Mason CJ, Wilson, Brennan, Deane, Dawson, Toohey and Gaudron JJ

Case opinions
- (7:0) Where a law creates a discriminatory and protectionist burden on interstate trade and commerce and is not pursuant or incidental to a non-protectionist purpose, it will be in breach of Section 92 of the Australian Constitution. (per Mason CJ, Wilson, Brennan, Deane, Dawson, Toohey & Gaudron JJ)

Cole v Whitfield, is a decision of the High Court of Australia. At issue was the interpretation of section 92 of the Australian Constitution, a provision which relevantly states:

... trade, commerce, and intercourse among the States, whether by means of internal carriage or ocean navigation, shall be absolutely free.

The court decided that s.92 prohibits burdens upon interstate trade, commerce, and intercourse of a 'protectionist kind'. The previously applied Individual Right interpretation of the section was abandoned in a unanimous joint judgement. Prior to Cole v Whitfield, s.92 was the most litigated section in the Constitution, bringing over 140 cases before the courts. This was partially the consequence of inconsistent and confusing jurisprudence under the previous interpretive approach, as was acknowledged by the joint judgement. The case largely settled s.92 jurisprudence, with the section only being infrequently the subject of litigation since.

== Background ==
=== Facts ===
Whitfield was a crayfish trader charged with the unlawful possession of undersized crayfish. He resided in Tasmania, but the fish were purchased in South Australia and shipped to Tasmania. Under South Australian state's law, the fish that he purchased were of a lawful size, but under Tasmanian laws, they were undersize. The Fisheries Act 1959, empowered the Governor of Tasmania to make regulations relating to a number of subjects, one of which was the classification of undersized fish. The Sea Fisheries Regulations 1962 outlawed catching male crayfish less than 11 cm (110 mm) and female crayfish less than 10.5 cm (105 mm) in length.

Whitfield and his company imported some crayfishes from South Australia for reselling, which were undersized under Tasmanian regulations. Cole, a Fisheries Inspector, charged Whitfield with a breach of the regulations. Whitfield pleaded not guilty and argued that section 92 protected the freedom of his interstate trade. The magistrate dismissed the complaint. Cole appealed to the Supreme Court of Tasmania; however, the case was removed to the High Court for determination of the constitutional question.

== Decision ==
The Court decided that s.92's effect on interstate trade and commerce, was only to make it immune from 'discriminatory burdens of a protectionist kind'.

The court examined the purpose of the Tasmanian laws, and found that as they were aimed at conservation; the laws were not protectionist. Therefore, the laws were not found to be in breach of s.92.

The court rejected s.92 jurisprudence made in earlier cases. The difficulty of s.92 jurisprudence, the court noted, flowed 'from its origin as a rallying call for federationists who wanted to be rid of discriminatory burdens and benefits in trade, and who would not suffer that call to be muffled by nice qualifications'. By 'refraining from defining any limitation on the freedom guaranteed by s.92 ... they ... passed to the courts the task of defining what aspects of inter-state trade were excluded from legislative or executive control or regulation'. This, the court noted, had resulted in a variety of legal propositions having arisen historically.

== See also ==
- Australian constitutional law
- Castlemaine Tooheys Ltd v South Australia
- Bath v Alston Holdings Pty Ltd
