= Castlemaine Tooheys Ltd v South Australia =

Australian constitutional law case

- Court: High Court of Australia
- Decided: 7 February 1990
- Citations: [1990] HCA 1, (1990) 169 CLR 436

Court membership
- Judges sitting: Mason CJ, Brennan, Deane, Dawson, Toohey, Gaudron and McHugh JJ

Case opinions
- (7:0) If a law is protectionist in nature, but has a non-protectionist purpose, the means chosen to attain the non-protectionist purpose must be necessary, or appropriate and adapted, and in this case, the higher deposits on non-refillable beer bottles was not found to be a proportionate means.

Castlemaine Tooheys Ltd v South Australia, is a High Court of Australia case that deals with whether a particular Act of South Australia contravenes Section 92 of the Constitution of Australia, which is about the freedom of interstate trade.

== Background ==
The Beverage Container Act 1975 (SA) required a mandatory deposit of 5 cents per bottle, which would be refunded when they were returned; refillable bottles were exempt from this deposit. A later amendment, the Beverage Container Act Amendment Act 1986 (SA) subjected non-refillable bottles to a refund of 15 cents and refillable bottles to a refund of 4 cents. Furthermore, the refund for non-refillable bottles was to be implemented by retailers, instead of a collection depot.

The Bond brewing companies brewed beer, most notably from the Tooheys Brewery, outside of South Australia, and they used non-refillable bottles as opposed to their South Australian counterparts. Although a 5 cent deposit would not have disadvantaged the Bond companies, the later Act's higher deposit and refund mechanism acted together to make their beer less competitive. Around the time of the amending Act, the Bond companies' advertising campaign had increased their market share at the expense of the principal South Australian brewer. The plaintiffs sought a declaration that the laws were invalid as being contrary to section 92.

== Decision ==
Although all parties conceded that the increase in the deposit disadvantages the Bond companies, the question to be resolved was whether it was permissible for the state legislation to disadvantage interstate beer over local beer, if it on its surface was directed at solving an environmental problem. The court's unanimous decision was that, in this case, the legislation was contrary to section 92 of the constitution.

Prima facie, a law that imposes a prohibition or requirement on both interstate and intrastate trade, or upon a particular interstate trader, is not protectionist. However, if the law is designed to secure a legitimate object and a non-discriminatory method exists, then it may suggest that the object is instead to discriminate. The burden upon interstate trade and commerce is legitimate provided that it is merely incidental to the attainment of the legitimate object, or if such regulation may be necessary or appropriate and adapted for the protection or enhancement of the welfare of the community.

The joint judgment by Mason CJ, Brennan, Deane, Dawson and Toohey JJ outlines the reasons why the 1986 legislation is not appropriate and adapted to the protection of the environment. The magnitude of the difference in refund between refillable and non-refillable bottles greatly exceeded the amount required to disadvantage the sale of beer in non-refillable bottles. The judges also criticised the part of the scheme that allowed for refillable bottles but not non-refillable bottles to be returned to a collection depot as not capable of justification as a means of achieving the environmental aims. The judges clarified that discrimination against interstate trade may still apply even though the "discrimination is directed at, or sustained by, all, some or only one of the relevant interstate traders". Furthermore, the judges did not think that the litter problem or the need to conserve energy resources provided a justification for the implementation of this scheme; they made reference to the quantitative impact of such a law, and the fact that alternative measures were open to the legislature to achieve these aims.

The joint judgment of Gaudron and McHugh JJ accepted the question of whether a law is appropriate and adapted, but also provided some guidance as to discrimination: "the essence of the legal notion of discrimination lies in the unequal treatment of equals, and, conversely, in the equal treatment of unequals".

== See also ==
- Container deposit legislation in Australia
- Australian constitutional law
