= Chifley government =

Government of Australia from 1945 to 1949

Chifley government

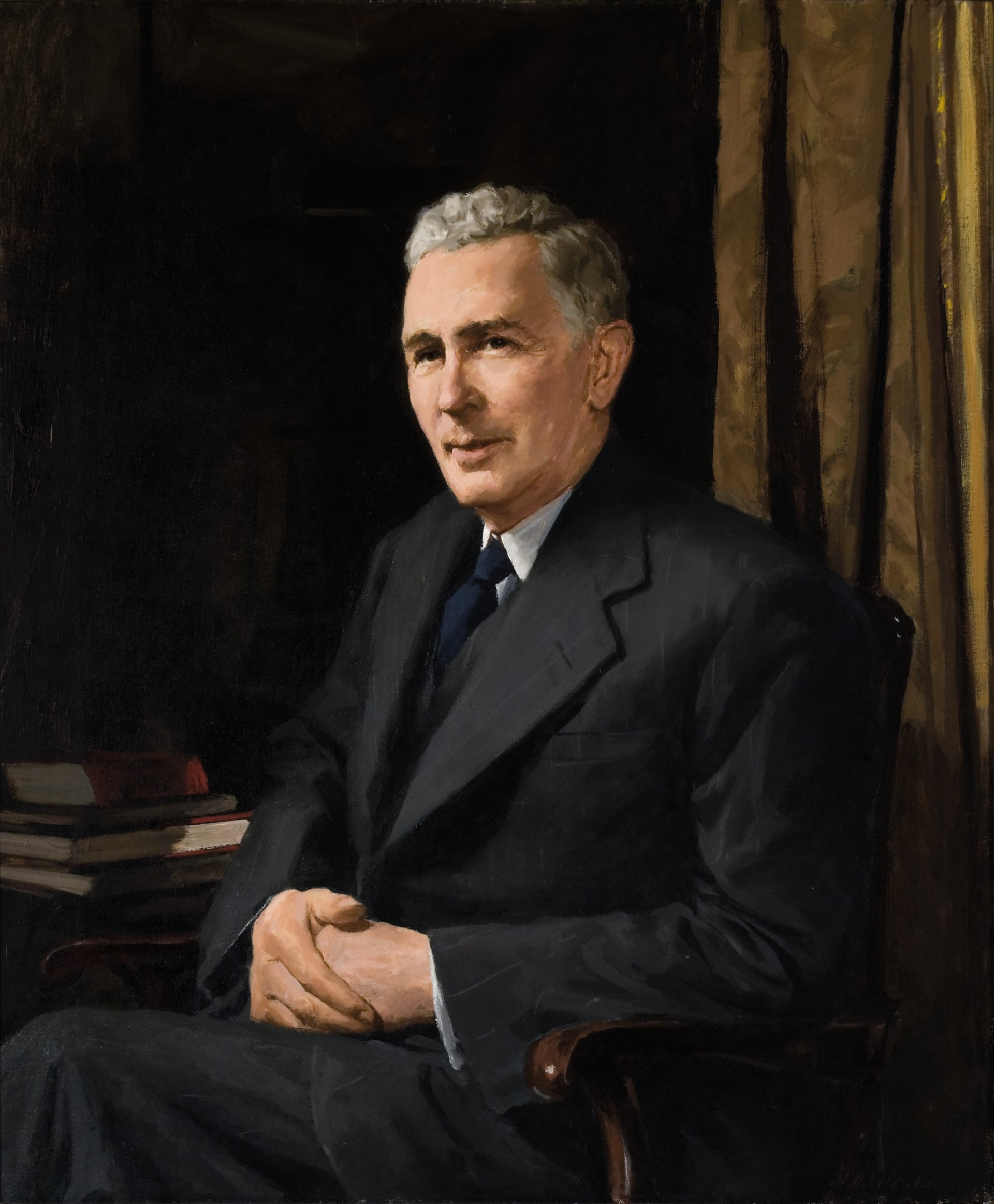

In office
- 13 July 1945 – 19 December 1949
- Monarch: George VI
- Prime Minister: Ben Chifley
- Deputy: Frank Forde (1945–1946); Herbert Evatt (1946–1949)
- Party: Labor
- Status: Majority
- Origin: Chifley wins 1945 Labor leadership election
- Demise: Lost 1949 election
- Predecessor: Forde government
- Successor: Menzies government (II)

The Chifley government was the federal executive government of Australia led by Prime Minister Ben Chifley. It was made up of members of the Australian Labor Party in the Australian Parliament from 1945 to 1949.

== Background ==
A week after Labor Prime Minister John Curtin died on the eve of victory in the Second World War in July 1945, the party elected Ben Chifley as Curtin's successor.

== In office ==
Following his 1945 election as leader of the Australian Labor Party after the death of John Curtin, Chifley, a former railway engine driver, became Australia's 16th Prime Minister on 13 July 1945. The Second World War ended with the defeat of Japan in the Pacific just four weeks later. Chifley served as Prime Minister and Treasurer. To combat inflationary pressures, he proposed a continuation of wartime price and import controls, and rationing of scarce commodities.

In August 1945, only two days after the end of World War II, the Australian parliament passed the Australian National Airways Bill, which set up the Australian National Airways Commission (ANAC) and charged it with the task of reconstructing the nation's air transport industry. In keeping with the Labor government's socialist leanings, the bill declared that licences of private operators would lapse for those routes that were adequately serviced by the national carrier. From this time on, it seemed, air transport in Australia would be a government monopoly. However, a legal challenge (Australian National Airways Pty Ltd v Commonwealth), backed by the Liberal opposition and business interests generally, was successful and in December 1945, the High Court ruled that the Commonwealth did not have the power to prevent the issue of airline licences to private companies. The government could set up an airline if it wished, but it could not legislate a monopoly. Much of the press objected strongly to the setting up of a public airline network, seeing it as a form of socialisation by stealth.

The bill was suitably amended to remove the monopoly provisions, and ANAC came into existence in February 1946. ANAC formed Trans Australia Airlines (TAA) in 1946, and nationalised Qantas in 1947. Chifley went on to win the 1946 election. Labor won 43 House of Representatives seats, with 15 won by the newly formed Liberal Party of Australia led by Robert Menzies, and 11 by their coalition partner, the Country Party (a further 4 seats went to splinter parties). In the Senate, Labor won 16 seats and the Liberal–Country Party coalition won 3 seats.

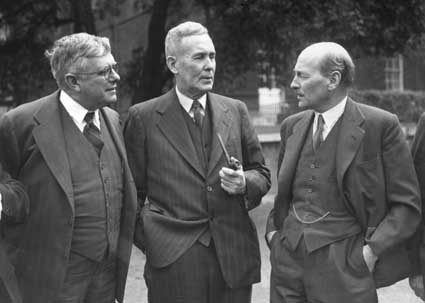
H. V. Evatt (left) and Ben Chifley (middle) with British Prime Minister Clement Attlee (right) at the Dominion and British Leaders Conference, London, 1946

Labor had sought to secure power over the supply of money and credit – amidst opposition from the private banks. The High Court of Australia invalidated part of his government's banking legislation, so in mid-1947 Chifley legislated to require at least local authorities and State governments to bank with the federally owned Commonwealth Bank. The Melbourne City Council successfully appealed against the legislation in the High Court. In response Chifley then proposed the total nationalisation of the banks. The move alarmed conservatives and Menzies said it foretold of a "coming dictatorship in Australia". Chifley told parliament the legislation would guard against both depression and inflation. Country Party leader Earle Page described the plan as a "communist ramp". The High Court declared the law unconstitutional and an appeal to the Privy Council upheld that ruling. Chifley nevertheless refused to repeal the law, and it remained a controversial issue at the 1949 election.

In the pursuit of centralist economic policy, the Chifley government also confirmed the continuation of the wartime measure under which the Commonwealth was the sole collector of income tax. Major national projects were also instituted, including the Snowy Mountains Scheme and an assisted immigration program. Despite demobilisation of Australian forces following war's end, Australia faced a labour shortage and Minister for Immigration Arthur Calwell launched the post war migration program – intended to bring out mainly British migrants to augment the Australian population.

In foreign policy, attorney-general and minister for external affairs H. V. Evatt was active in the formation of the United Nations. Australia played a significant mediatory role in the early years of the United Nations, successfully lobbying for an increased role for smaller and middle-ranking nations, and a stronger commitment to employment rights into the U.N. Charter. Evatt was elected president of the third session of the United Nations General Assembly (September 1948 to May 1949). Internationally, the rise of Communism was a developing concern for many in Australia. Chifley sought to oppose the re-establishment of Dutch control of Indonesia and refused help to British efforts to quell the developing insurgency in Malaya. The Catholic-based "Movement" meanwhile campaigned strongly to drive Communists out of leadership positions in trade unions, prefiguring a coming split in the ALP over the growing influence of the Movement.

At the conference of the New South Wales Labor Party in June 1949, Chifley sought to define the labour movement as having:

[A] great objective – the light on the hill – which we aim to reach by working for the betterment of mankind... [Labor would] bring something better to the people, better standards of living, greater happiness to the mass of the people'.

With an increasingly uncertain economic outlook, and after his attempt to nationalise the banks, his government's continuation of some wartime controls, and a strike by the Communist-dominated Miners Federation, Chifley lost office at the 1949 federal election to Robert Menzies' Liberal-Country Party Coalition. The Liberal Party won 55 seats and its coalition partner the Country Party 19 in the House of Representatives, as opposed to Labor's 47 seats. Labor then commenced a 23-year period in opposition in the federal parliament.

== See also ==
- History of Australia
- History of Australia since 1945
- First Chifley Ministry
- Second Chifley Ministry
