= Bank Nationalisation Case =

Judgment of the High Court of Australia

Bank of New South Wales v Commonwealth
- Court: High Court of Australia
- Decided: 11 August 1948
- Citations: [1948] HCA 7, (1948) 76 CLR 1

Case history
- Appealed to: Privy Council (see below)

Court membership
- Judges sitting: Chief Justice John Latham; Justice George Rich; Justice Hayden Starke; Justice Owen Dixon; Justice Edward McTiernan; Justice Dudley Williams

Case opinions
- The Banking Act 1947 was beyond the power of the Commonwealth Parliament as: it involved compulsory acquisition that was not "on just terms", as required under section 51(xxxi) of the Constitution (per each member of the Court); it violated the requirement that trade and commerce "shall be absolutely free", as required under section 92 of the Constitution, which is to be understood as a right of persons to trade freely inter-state (per Rich, Starke, Dixon and Williams)

The Bank Nationalisation Case, also called Bank of New South Wales v Commonwealth (1948) 76 CLR 1, is a 1948 decision of the High Court of Australia (upheld on appeal to the Privy Council) that invalidated Chifley government legislation that attempted to nationalise the private banking sector. Separate majorities held that the legislation breached three different provisions of the Constitution: section 92 (requiring trade and commerce between the states to be "absolutely free"), section 51(xxxi) (requiring compulsory acquisition of property to be "on just terms") and section 75(iii) (which grants the High Court original jurisdiction in cases where the Commonwealth is sued).

A subsequent appeal application by the Commonwealth to the Privy Council was dismissed on jurisdictional grounds. The Board held that the case involved potential questions around the limits of the powers between the Commonwealth and the states and hence they were precluded from hearing the case under section 74 of the Constitution. However, the Board did affirm that the legislation breached section 92 of the Constitution, thus endorsing the individual right interpretation of the section. Additionally, the Board formulated its own test for when section 92 would be breached. This test was adopted and applied by the High Court until 1988, where in the case of Cole v Whitfield the section was reinterpreted as a prohibition on protectionist legislation.

The case rendered a key pillar of Labor's economic policy unworkable and possibly was influential in the eventual defeat of the government in 1949. Labor remained in opposition for 23 years and with nationalisation no longer an option, the party moved towards less direct methods to achieve its social and economic goals. The use of tied grants to the states (section 65) and the external affairs power (section 51(xxix)) were later utilised by governments, beginning with the Whitlam government in 1972.

== Background ==
Comfortable in government after two strong election wins, the Labor government of Ben Chifley announced in 1947 its intention to nationalise private banks in Australia. To accomplish this goal the Parliament passed the Banking Act 1947. Under the Act, shares in the private banks would be owned by the Commonwealth Bank, which in turn would be owned by the Federal Government. The proposal was controversial, and the constitutional validity of the law was challenged by a number of banks, including the Bank of New South Wales, as well as the non-Labor states of Victoria, South Australia and Western Australia. The banks were represented by a formidable legal team, with the Australian incorporated banks represented by Garfield Barwick KC, who would later become the Chief Justice, and the United Kingdom incorporated banks represented by Frank Kitto KC, who would later be appointed to the High Court, while the Commonwealth was represented by the former High Court judge Herbert Evatt KC.

== High Court decision ==
The Court hearing lasted for a record 39 days. The summary of the parties arguments occupies 143 pages of the Commonwealth Law Report. A number of arguments were put to the Court, most of which were rejected.

However the Court declared the law invalid on four grounds, albeit by different majority of judges:

- Section 92 of the Constitution, in providing that "trade, commerce, and intercourse among the States ... shall be absolutely free." conferred a positive right on the banks to engage in the business of interstate banking.
- it involved the acquisition of property that was not "on just terms, contrary to section 51(xxxi) of the Constitution. The problem with acquisition arose out of the Act's sections detailing the appointment of new directors for all private banks with the power to control, manage, direct and dispose of assets of those banks. Dixon J held that this was a "circuitous device to acquire indirectly the substance of proprietary interest."
- The Act, in setting up a "Court of Claims", invalidly attempted to oust the original jurisdiction of the High Court.

== Privy Council decision ==
Commonwealth v Bank of New South Wales
- Court: Privy Council
- Decided: 26 October 1949
- Citations: [1949] UKPC 37, [1950] AC 235; [1949] UKPCHCA 1, (1949) 79 CLR 497

Case history
- Appealed from: High Court of Australia (see above)

Court membership
- Judges sitting: Lord Porter; Lord Simonds; Lord Normand; Lord Morton of Henryton; Lord MacDermott

Case opinions
- The Board did not have the jurisdiction to hear the case, as it potentially involved "inter se" matters as described in section 74 of the Australian Constitution; In obiter: section 92 of the Constitution protects an individual right to freely trade inter-state. The test to determine if a direct burden on trade is merely regulatory will turn on both legal and "political, social or economic" factors.

Laws applied
- Superseded by
- Cole v Whitfield (1986) (in relation to section 92)

In appealing the decision to the Privy Council, the Commonwealth adopted a deliberate strategy of limiting the grounds of appeal to avoid seeking a certificate from the High Court under section 74 of the Constitution. The case was argued for 37 days before the Privy Council, one of the longest in its history, during which two of the Lordships assigned to the case (Lord Uthwatt and Lord du Parcq) died.

The Privy Council endorsed the High Court decision in adopting the individual rights approach. Provisions of the Commonwealth law prohibited private banks from carrying out interstate business banking. Interstate banking transactions under the law were thus not "absolutely free" and hence in violation of Section 92 of the Constitution. The Law Lords held that a simple legislative prohibition of interstate trade and commerce would be constitutionally invalid, but a law seeking to regulate or prescribe rules as to the manner of trade and commerce would not necessarily be in breach of section 92. The Board noted that the question of whether a law was merely regulatory or unduly discriminatory "will often be not so much legal as political, social or economic. Yet it must be solved by a court of law."

Additionally, while rejected this nationalisation by the government, the Board left the door open to future takeovers where "on its own facts and in its own setting of time and circumstances ... prohibition with a view to State monopoly was the only practical and reasonable method of regulation".

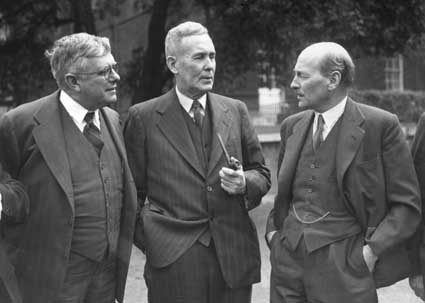
Ben Chifley (centre) with Herbert Evatt (left) and Clement Attlee (right) at the Dominion and British Leaders Conference, London, 1946

== Aftermath ==
At the 1949 federal election the Chifley government lost power, ostensibly due to the problems regarding this legislation and the Court case.

This particular understanding of s 92 would remain highly influential, until it was overturned in favour a free trade interpretation in Cole v Whitfield.

== See also ==
- Constitutionalism
- Constitutional economics
- Political economy
- Rule according to higher law
- Australian National Airways Pty Ltd v Commonwealth (1945)
