= Section 92 of the Constitution of Australia =

Law regulating trade between states

Section 92 of the Constitution of Australia, as far as is still relevant today is:

... trade, commerce, and intercourse among the States, whether by means of internal carriage or ocean navigation, shall be absolutely free.

This provision has been the cornerstone of significant Australian constitutional jurisprudence, which has also been quite complex. As the High Court of Australia observed in Cole v Whitfield:

20. The creation of a limitation where none was expressed and where no words of limitation were acceptable was a task which, having regard to the diverse and changing nature of inter-State trade, commerce and intercourse, was likely to produce a variety of propositions. And so it has. Sir Robert Garran contemplated that a student of the first fifty years of case law on s.92 might understandably "close( ) his notebook, sell( )his law books, and resolve( ) to take up some easy study, like nuclear physics or higher mathematics." ... Some thirty years on, the student who is confronted with the heightened confusion arising from the additional case law ending with Miller v. TCN Channel Nine would be even more encouraged to despair of identifying the effect of the constitutional guarantee.

== Text ==
The full text of Section 92 is as follows:

On the imposition of uniform duties of customs, trade, commerce, and intercourse among the States, whether by means of internal carriage or ocean navigation, shall be absolutely free. But notwithstanding anything in this Constitution, goods imported before the imposition of uniform duties of customs into any State, or into any Colony which, whilst the goods remain therein, becomes a State, shall, on thence passing into another State within two years after the imposition of such duties, be liable to any duty chargeable on the importation of such goods into the Commonwealth, less any duty paid in respect of the goods on their importation.

== Background in the Constitutional Conventions ==
Before the beginning of the first Constitutional Convention in Sydney in 1891, Sir Henry Parkes originally proposed the following resolution:

That the trade and intercourse between the Federated Colonies, whether by means of land carriage or coastal navigation, shall be free from the payment of Customs Duties, and from all restrictions whatsoever, except from such regulations as may be necessary for the conduct of business.

At the Convention itself, the wording of the resolution that was presented was altered to read:

That the trade and intercourse between the Federated Colonies, whether by means of land carriage or coastal navigation, shall be absolutely free.

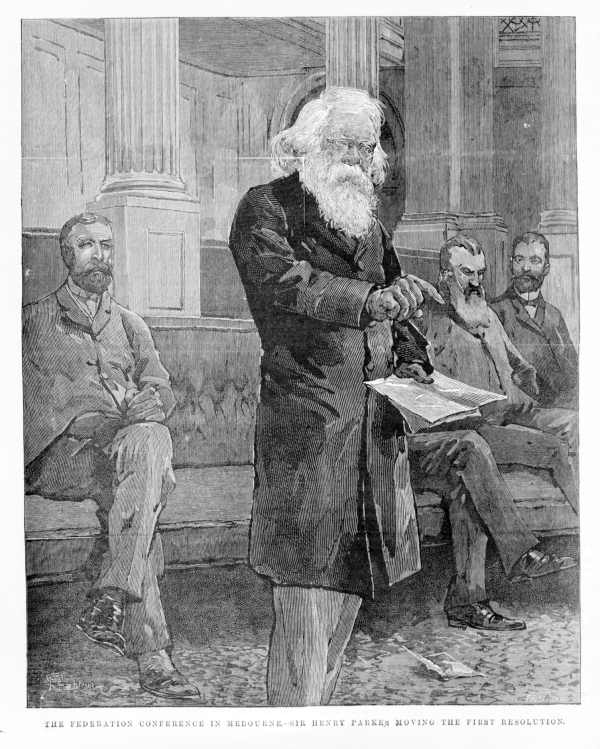
A wood engraving of Sir Henry Parkes moving the first resolution at the federation conference in Melbourne, 1 March 1890

As Parkes said at that Convention, in explaining the nature of his proposal:

I seek to define what seems to me an absolutely necessary condition of anything like perfect federation, that is, that Australia, as Australia, shall be free — free on the borders, free everywhere — in its trade and intercourse between its own people; that there shall be no impediment of any kind — that there shall be no barrier of any kind between one section of the Australian people and another; but, that the trade and the general communication of these people shall flow on from one end of the continent to the other, with no one to stay its progress or call it to account.

While the resolution carried, no action was taken on the Convention's proposals because of political changes in New South Wales. The matter was revisited at the 1897–1898 Convention's first session in Adelaide, where it was promoted by Edmund Barton and adopted as one of the "principal conditions of federation" that "the trade and intercourse between the Federated Colonies, whether by land or sea, shall be absolutely free." In the debates, Alfred Deakin was concerned whether this, together with the proposed Commonwealth power to regulate interstate trade and commerce, would deprive the States of all power to regulate trade even within their own borders, while Isaac Isaacs maintained that the proposal only dealt with the question of border duties between the States.

At the Sydney session, Barton intended to amend the proposal, by declaring that "trade and intercourse throughout the Commonwealth is not to be restricted or interfered with by any taxes, charges or imposts" but no decision was taken at that time.

At the Melbourne session, Isaac Isaacs took issue with this amendment, declaring that such language would extend beyond interstate trade into intrastate trade, as it was both ambiguous and too general. Other speakers, such as John Downer, felt that such was not the case. An amendment was passed, substituting "between the States" for "throughout the Commonwealth." Towards the end of the session, that phrase was changed to read "among the States," but not without intense debate about the nature of the clause. Barton responded to the criticism thus:

I do not know why intercolonial free-trade, if it is essential to federation, should be objected to when it is provided for in the Constitution in so many words.

The final wording that appeared as s. 92 was adopted towards the end of the Melbourne session. "It was typical of the situation that Sir George Reid, the New South Wales Premier famous for the equivocations on both federation and free trade, should have praised the section as 'a little bit of layman's language.' He was probably the last person to give it any praise."

== The nature of "trade, commerce, and intercourse among the States" ==
"Trade and commerce" and "intercourse" are two separate concepts, as noted in Cole v Whitfield:

13. ...The notions of absolutely free trade and commerce and absolutely free intercourse are quite distinct and neither the history of the clause nor the ordinary meaning of its words require that the content of the guarantee of freedom of trade and commerce be seen as governing or governed by the content of the guarantee of freedom of intercourse.

In that regard:

- "trade and commerce" includes "the mutual communings, the negotiations, verbal and by correspondence, the bargain, the transport and the delivery",
- "intercourse" is the ability "to pass to and fro among the States without burden, hindrance or restriction",

and, as noted by Isaacs J. (as he then was) in Duncan v Queensland:

the moment the State says "You may keep but shall not sell your merchantable goods, not because they are deleterious but because they are not," then trade and commerce are directly prohibited; and though this is still perfectly competent to the State so far as relates to its purely internal trade, it is, in my clear opinion, invalid if sec. 92 is to have any operation at all—as to inter-State trade.

As well, "among the States" has been given a broad meaning, as Evatt J. observed in R v Vizzard, ex parte Hill:

The section, if read as a whole, postulates the free flow of goods inter-State, so that goods produced in any State may be freely marketed in every other State, and so that nothing can lawfully be done to obstruct or prevent such marketing. The section may be infringed by hostile action within the State of origin of the goods, ..., or at the border by means of prohibitions upon exit or entry, or by laws preventing or prohibiting sale or exchange within that State to the markets of which the commodities are destined. The declaration of sec. 92 covers goods which are consigned to the market as well as goods which have been already sold, and are in the course of delivery, in this sense, that consignment and delivery, being part of commercial intercourse, cannot be prevented or obstructed by State legislation.

Therefore, "interstate trade" can fall into three categories:

- where a seller in one State contracts with a buyer in another State, and then delivers the goods between the two States
- where a seller brings his goods across the border, finds a buyer in that other State, and then sells the goods to him
- where a seller in one State contracts with a buyer in another State, and then delivers the goods between the two States, though without any contractual obligation to so deliver

The first two categories are clearly completely interstate transactions, but only the delivery component in the third is interstate, as the High Court has resisted the idea that delivery alone would colour the entire transaction, except possibly where it can be shown that both parties had contemplated that the arrangement would entail interstate delivery.

== Interpretation in the courts ==
=== Historical development ===
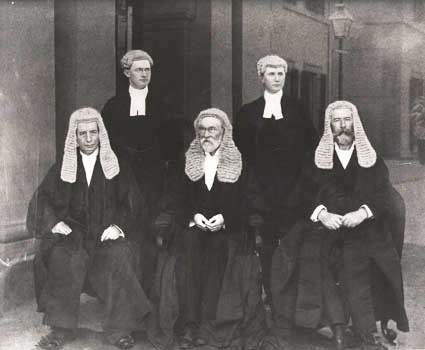
The first bench of the High Court: Barton, Griffith and O'Connor seated, with court officials in the background. Photo taken at the first sitting of the court on 6 October 1903.

Lord Wright of Durley, seven years after his retirement from the Judicial Committee of the Privy Council, expressed the opinion that s. 92 ought to have been construed purely as a fiscal clause. That, however, has not found significant support in Australia's constitutional jurisprudence.

Section 92 was first tested in the High Court of Australia in Fox v Robbins (1909), in which a Western Australia law that assessed a lower rate of tax on liquor made from fruit produced within the State (in comparison with other types of liquor) was held to be invalid. As Barton J. noted:

I must not for a moment be taken to cast any doubt on the capacity of a State to tax, together with its own products, goods produced in other States, when brought into it for sale or consumption. When the inter-state transit is over and they have become part of the mass of property within the State, any goods may be taxed, no matter whence they have come. But they must be taxed alike with all other such goods in the State. The tax must be general, and laid equally on all goods of the kind to be taxed, whether their State of origin be the taxing State or another. And what I say of taxes applies to other imposts and burdens.

In the case of James v Commonwealth (1936), which expanded on the previous ruling in James v. Cowan, the Judicial Committee of the Privy Council decided that s. 92 ought to be construed more in the nature of laisser passer (French for "let it pass") than of laisser faire (French for "let do"). It also ruled that it restricted the Commonwealth Parliament as well as State Parliaments, thus greatly affecting the Parliament's authority to regulate interstate trade and commerce under s. 51(i). In making this ruling, the Privy Council affirmed the observation of Evatt and McTiernan JJ in the High Court:

We are definitely of opinion that sec. 92 lays down a general rule of economic freedom, and necessarily binds all parties and authorities within the Commonwealth, including the Commonwealth itself, because, as was pointed out by the Privy Council itself, it establishes a "system based on the absolute freedom of trade among the States" (Colonial Sugar Refining Co. v. Irving)

Since Fox, the decisions of the High Court have turned on different approaches, the most prominent of which have been:

- the individual rights (or laissez-faire) approach, and
- the free trade approach.

=== "Individual rights" approach ===
The "individual rights" approach became the dominant view in Bank of New South Wales v Commonwealth (1948), where any individual trader who was burdened in carrying on interstate trade could attract s.92 protection, but the freedom was not absolute:

- unless the legislation directly burdened an interstate trade, commerce or intercourse, or an essential attribute thereof, s. 92 would not be breached
- it was subject to the exception for permissible burden or reasonable regulation.

The most notable example of this approach came in Australian National Airways Pty Ltd v Commonwealth (1945), where the High Court ruled that the Commonwealth could establish a state-owned airline, but could not grant it a monopoly on interstate air traffic. Latham C.J. summarised it thus:

The Act is a prohibition, with a single exception, of such services, and that prohibition is quite independent of any considerations relating to safety, efficiency, airworthiness, &c., which otherwise might have been relied upon as the basis of an argument that the statute regulated such services in the sense of introducing regular and orderly control into what otherwise might be unregulated, disorderly, possibly foolishly competitive, and therefore inefficient services. The exclusion of competition with the Commission is not a system of regulation and is, in my opinion, a violation of s. 92. If a provision of this character does not infringe s. 92 when applied to carriers, I can see no answer to the contention that a similar provision might be applied to all inter-State traders without any breach of s. 92. If that were the case, the Commonwealth Parliament could create a corporation and give it an exclusive right to engage in every form of inter-State trade and commerce, or, without creating a corporation, could give an exclusive licence to a particular person to engage in such trade and commerce. Such a result would reduce s. 92 to almost complete insignificance.

Some notable exclusions from the scope of s. 92 have included:

- the withdrawal of beef cattle from interstate trade by the Queensland government, under a law reserving such produce for Imperial forces in the First World War
- the compulsory acquisition of the entire wheat crop of New South Wales in 1914–15 by the State government;
- the expropriation of all milk entering into a milk marketing district established under New South Wales law

The reasoning for this approach was given by Barton J. in New South Wales v Commonwealth (the Wheat case):

Here the Statute converts the dominion of the owner into the dominion of the State. It is no answer to the effect of that change of dominion to say that the sale is not voluntary. The protection given by sec. 92 to the dominion of the old owner is lost to him, and becomes a protection to the dominion of the new owner, whether State or ordinary citizen. It would be a strange thing to say that sec. 92 means that a protection given in respect of dominion is retained by him who lost that dominion under the law, or to say that liability instead of protection is the lot of him to whom the law gives the dominion.

=== Current approach for trade and commerce under Cole ===
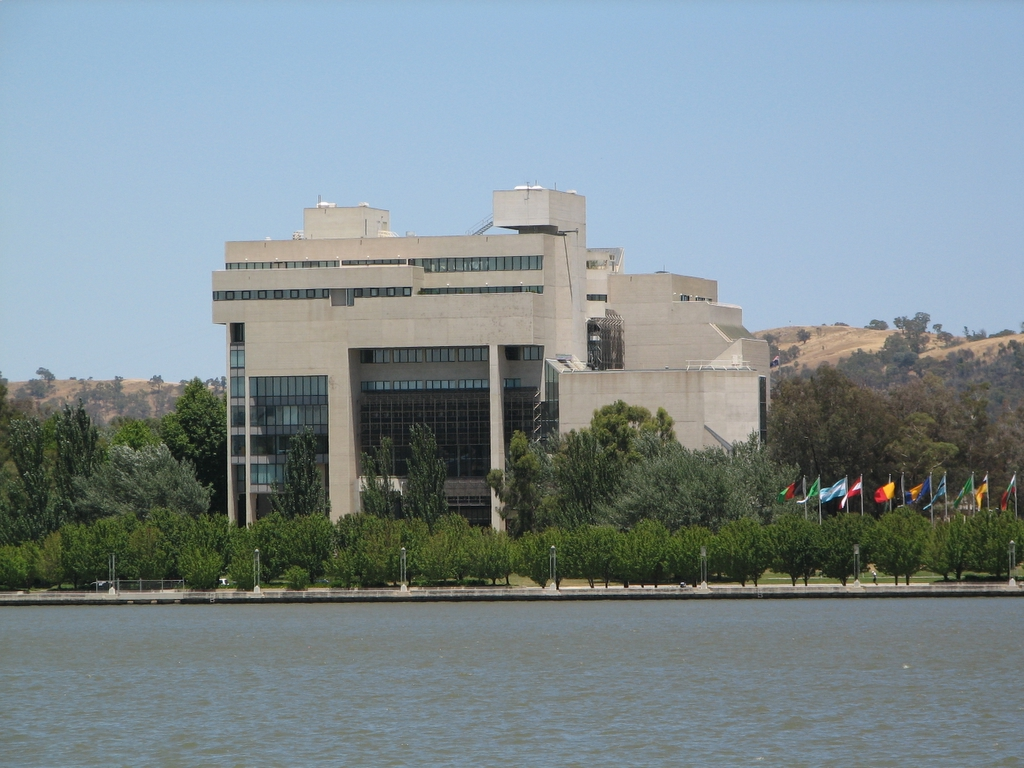
High Court building, view from the lake

This approach would be supplanted in 1988 by the free trade approach in the pivotal case of Cole v Whitfield, where, in a unanimous decision, the High Court identified the full extent of s. 92:

18. The purpose of the section is clear enough: to create a free trade area throughout the Commonwealth and to deny to Commonwealth and States alike a power to prevent or obstruct the free movement of people, goods and communications across State boundaries....

22. The expression "free trade" commonly signified in the nineteenth century, as it does today, an absence of protectionism, that is, the protection of domestic industries against foreign competition....

Accordingly, s. 92 prohibits the Commonwealth and the States from imposing burdens on interstate trade and commerce which:

- discriminate against it by conferring an advantage on intrastate trade or commerce of the same kind, and
- are protectionist in character

Because of the new approach in Cole, the High Court will be less concerned with issues of policy, and, therefore, will not be concerned with the following matters where there is no protectionist purpose or effect:

- a State of Commonwealth law results in the cessation of any type of interstate trade,
- some or all individuals are prevented in carrying out such trade,
- interstate trade is taxed,
- a variety of differing State laws add to the cost of national enterprise, or prevent it from supplying consumers in some States,
- one form of trade or industry is prevented from competition from another, or
- trade or industry is burdened more than is necessary or appropriate to achieve some social object.

Accordingly, in Barley Marketing Board (NSW) v Norman, it was held that the compulsory sale of barley to a State marketing board did not contravene s. 92, as the grain had not yet entered interstate trade.

The appropriate test in determining the issue of unlawful protectionism under s. 92 was subsequently formulated in Castlemaine Tooheys Ltd v South Australia, as follows:

- is there a legitimate local interest in need of protection?
- are the measures necessary and appropriate, and adapted to protecting the local interest?
- is the impact on interstate trade and commerce incidental and not disproportionate to the achievement of the objective of protecting the public interest?

In that regard, Gaudron J. and McHugh J. noted in Castlemaine that:

8. ...whether a law is appropriate and adapted to an objective and whether any burden imposed on interstate trade is incidental and not disproportionate to the achievement of that objective, will often sufficiently reveal that the law is discriminatory in a protectionist sense. However, the essence of the legal notion of discrimination lies in the unequal treatment of equals, and, conversely, in the equal treatment of unequals. Thus, if there is no inequality or relevant difference between the subject matter of interstate trade and the subject matter of intrastate trade, a law which is appropriate and adapted to an objective and burdens interstate trade only incidentally and not disproportionately to that objective will, in our view, offend against s.92 if its practical effect is protectionist – particularly if there exist alternative means involving no or a lesser burden on interstate trade.

The second step of the Castlemaine test was modified in 2008 in Betfair Pty Limited v Western Australia, to include the concept of reasonable necessity, which also depends on proportionality:

110. What is involved here is an attempt at an evidentiary level to measure something of an imponderable. But, allowing for the presence to some degree of a threat of this nature, a method of countering it, which is an alternative to that offered by prohibition of betting exchanges, must be effective but non-discriminatory regulation. That was the legislative choice taken by Tasmania and it cannot be said that that taken by Western Australia is necessary for the protection of the integrity of the racing industry of that State. In other words, the prohibitory State law is not proportionate; it is not appropriate and adapted to the propounded legislative object.

Betfair effectively allows the High Court to consider both the purpose and effect of any law — essentially its pith and substance — that will be contested in future s. 92 jurisprudence, as:

47. ...[A] law the practical effect of which is to discriminate against interstate trade in a protectionist sense is not saved by the presence of other objectives such as public health which are not protectionist in character.

=== Intercourse under Nationwide News ===
In Nationwide News Pty Ltd v Wills, the following test was given by Brennan J. (as he then was) to determine whether a law infringes the s. 92 guarantee to free intercourse:

- whether the law is enacted for the purpose of burdening interstate intercourse.
- if the law is enacted for some other purpose, whether it is appropriate and adapted to the fulfilment of that other purpose, but a law may be found to be enacted for the prohibited purpose by reference to its meaning or effect.
- where a law imposes a burden by reason of the crossing of the border, or it has the effect of preventing or impeding the crossing of the border, it will be held invalid if that is its only or chief purpose.
- the above are subject to permissible regulation which might take the form "of excluding from passage across the frontier of a State creatures or things calculated to injure its citizens", but the severity and need for such measures must still be assessed.

=== Palmer v Western Australia (2021) ===
In 2020, Western Australia closed its border to interstate travellers due to the COVID-19 Pandemic. Mining magnate Clive Palmer challenged the border closure after being refused entry to the state, citing Section 92 of the Constitution. The High Court of Australia ruled against Palmer and upheld the travel ban, ruling that the constitutional guarantee to 'absolutely free' movement of people could be violated if the burden of the restriction was 'reasonably necessary'. In the same week, the court also rejected a challenge against the government lockdowns in Melbourne, finding that there was no 'implied freedom of movement (within a state) in the Constitution'.

== Comparisons ==
- Dormant commerce clause (United States' Constitution)
- Section 121 of the Constitution Act, 1867 (Canadian Constitution)

== Sources ==
- Beasley, F.R. (1948). "The Commonwealth Constitution: Section 92 – Its History in the Federal Conventions (Part 1)". University of Western Australia Law Review. (1948) 1(1) UWA Law Review 97; Beasley, F. R. (1949). "Part 2". University of Western Australia Law Review. (1949) 1(2) University of Western Australia Law Review 273; Beasley, F. R. (1950). "Part 3". University of Western Australia Law Review. (1950) 1(3) University of Western Australia Law Review 433. Retrieved 12 September 2012.
- Lord Wright of Durley (1954). "Section 92 — A problem piece". Sydney Law Review. 1 (2): 145.
- Carney, Gerard (1991). "The Re-interpretation of Section 92: The Decline of Free Enterprise and the Rise of Free Trade" (PDF). Bond Law Review. 3 (2): 149. doi:10.53300/001c.5208.
- Coper, Michael (1985). "In the beginning there was interstate trade..." (PDF). Review of Marketing and Agricultural Economics. 53 (3): 149.
- Coper, Michael (25 March 1992). "Section 92 of the Australian Constitution since Cole v Whitfield" (PDF). Parliament of Australia.
- Puig, Gonzalo Villalta (2008). "A European saving test for Section 92 of the Australian Constitution" (PDF). Deakin Law Review. 13 (1): 99. doi:10.21153/dlr2008vol13no1art154.
- Zines, Leslie (2008). The High Court and the Constitution (5th ed.). Leichhardt, New South Wales: The Federation Press. pp. 139–197. ISBN 978-186287-691-0.
