= Australian National Airways Pty Ltd v Commonwealth =

Judgement of the High Court of Australia

Australian National Airways Pty Ltd v Commonwealth (No 1)
- Court: High Court of Australia
- Decided: 14 December 1945
- Citations: [1945] HCA 41, (1945) 71 CLR 29

Case history
- Subsequent actions: Australian National Airways Pty Ltd v Commonwealth (No 2) [1946] HCA 10, (1946) 71 CLR 115

Court membership
- Judges sitting: Latham CJ, Rich, Starke, Dixon & Williams JJ

Australian National Airways Pty Ltd v Commonwealth (No 1) – most commonly known as Australian National Airways Pty Ltd v Commonwealth and also referred to as The Airlines Case or the ANA Case – was a High Court of Australia decision. The case dealt with limits of the powers of the Australian Federal Government under sections 51 and 92 of the Australian Constitution. The outcome of the case was that the Federal Government could found a federally owned airline, but it could not hinder private sector competition with that airline.

== Background ==
In mid-1945, the Labor Federal Government of Prime Minister Ben Chifley introduced a bill into the House of Representatives that would have the effect of nationalising interstate Airlines in Australia. At the time, Australian National Airways ("ANA") was the dominant domestic carrier in Australia. After the bill received Royal Assent as the "Australian Airlines Act (1945)", it was immediately challenged by ANA in the High Court in its "original jurisdiction" as arbiter of Constitutional Law. ANA argued that the Act was in breach of sections 51 and 92 of the Constitution.

== Decision ==
The High Court, per curiam, found that while nationalised enterprises could be established, ss 51 and 92 did not empower the Commonwealth to acquire pre-existing enterprises (in this case, an airline). ANA then sought to apply for a certificate under Section 74 of the Constitution of Australia to appeal to the Privy Council for a judgment on further restriction of Commonwealth powers. That application was denied in Australian National Airways Pty Ltd v Commonwealth (No 2).

== See also ==
- Amalgamated Society of Engineers v Adelaide Steamship Co Ltd
- Australian constitutional law
- Australian National Airways
- Garfield Barwick
- Trans Australia Airlines
- Two Airlines Policy (1950s-1990)
- Bank Nationalisation Case (1948)
