= Anthony Mason (judge) =

Australian judge (1925–2026)

The Honourable Sir Anthony Mason AC KBE GBM KC
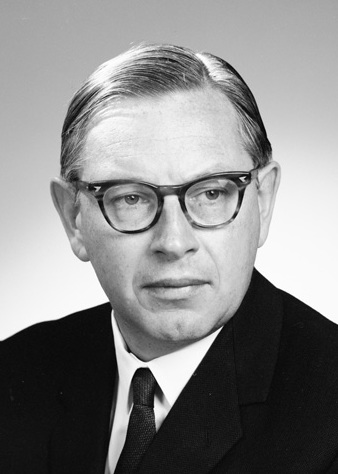
- Mason c. 1968

Non-Permanent Judge of the Court of Final Appeal of Hong Kong
- In office 1997–2015
- Appointed by: Tung Chee-hwa

Chief Justice of Australia
- In office 6 February 1987 – 20 April 1995
- Nominated by: Bob Hawke
- Appointed by: Sir Ninian Stephen
- Preceded by: Sir Harry Gibbs
- Succeeded by: Sir Gerard Brennan

Justice of the High Court of Australia
- In office 7 August 1972 – 6 February 1987
- Nominated by: William McMahon
- Appointed by: Sir Paul Hasluck
- Preceded by: Sir William Owen
- Succeeded by: Mary Gaudron

Judge of the Supreme Court of New South Wales
- In office 1 May 1969 – 6 August 1972
- Nominated by: Robert Askin
- Appointed by: Sir Roden Cutler
- Preceded by: New Seat
- Succeeded by: Robert Hope

Personal details
- Born: 21 April 1925 Sydney, New South Wales, Australia
- Died: 17 March 2026 (aged 100)
- Relations: Harold Mason (uncle)
- Education: University of Sydney

Sir Anthony Frank Mason (21 April 1925 – 17 March 2026) was an Australian judge who served as the ninth Chief Justice of Australia, in office from 1987 to 1995. He was first appointed to the High Court in 1972, having previously served on the Supreme Court of New South Wales. He had also served as a non-permanent judge of the Court of Final Appeal of Hong Kong from 1997 to 2015.

== Early life and education ==
Mason was born in Sydney on 21 April 1925. He was one of four children born to Eileen (née McArdle) and Frank Maxwell Mason. His father, a World War I veteran and Military Cross recipient, was a registered surveyor who developed a substantial practice on the North Shore of Sydney. He served terms as president of the New South Wales bodies for surveying and town planning.

He received his early education at Kincoppal, Elizabeth Bay, where he was an acquaintance of future federal attorney-general Tom Hughes. He went on to attend Sydney Grammar School and became interested in law through his uncle Harold Mason, a prominent Sydney barrister who served briefly in state parliament. His mother had also intended he become a barrister from a young age. Mason's father divorced his mother in 1936, on the grounds she had engaged in "habitual drunkenness and neglect of domestic duties". His father later remarried to Elvira Clare "Bobbie" Wood.

Mason enlisted in the Royal Australian Air Force (RAAF) in January 1944 as an aircraftman (AC2). He was commissioned as a flying officer in November 1944 and undertook training in Canada as a navigator, logging over 100 hours in Avro Ansons. He was discharged in September 1945, at which time he was stationed at the 2nd Aircrew Graduate Training School in Calgary.

After leaving the military, Mason enrolled at the University of Sydney to study arts and law, graduating with first-class honours. He later recalled Julius Stone as an influential lecturer and credited John Holmes with inspiring his interest in constitutional law. He served his articles of clerkship with Clayton Utz in Sydney and was also an associate to David Roper, a judge of the Supreme Court of New South Wales.

== Legal career ==
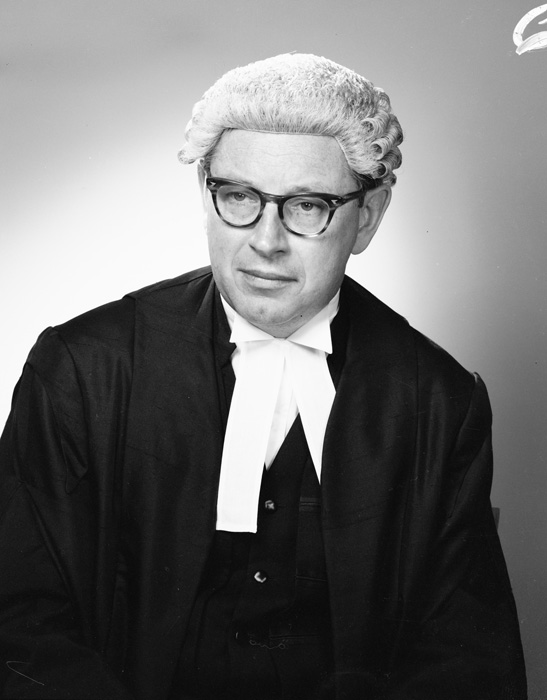
Mason as Solicitor-General, wearing court dress

Mason was admitted to the New South Wales Bar. For five years he lectured in law at the University of Sydney, his students including three future High Court Justices, Mary Gaudron, William Gummow and Dyson Heydon. In November 1964, aged 39, Mason was announced as the new Solicitor-General of Australia, with an accompanying appointment as Queen's Counsel (QC). He was the first person to serve as solicitor-general in a standalone capacity, as the office had previously been held by the secretary of the Attorney-General's Department. In 1966, he appeared opposite future High Court colleague William Deane, successfully arguing that the Judicial Committee of the Privy Council should reject an appeal from the High Court case of R v Anderson; Ex parte IPEC-Air Pty Ltd. He served until 1969 and during this time contributed greatly to the development of the Commonwealth's administrative law system.

== Judicial career ==
In 1969, Mason was made a judge of the Supreme Court of New South Wales, where he sat as a member of the Court of Appeal. In the same year he was appointed by the Gorton government to a three-year term on the council of the Australian National University. He served on the Supreme Court until 1972, when he was appointed to the bench of the High Court of Australia and received a knighthood (KBE). After fifteen years on the High Court, and following the retirement of Sir Harry Gibbs, in 1987, Mason was appointed Chief Justice; he retired in 1995 on reaching the constitutionally mandatory retirement age of 70.

Mason had a significant influence over the High Court. Initially a conservative judge, his tenure as Chief Justice can be seen as the high-water mark of the movement away from the "strict legalism" which characterised the High Court under Sir Owen Dixon. Mason was more flexible in his attitude to precedent than many other judges, viewing it more as a policy for consistency than something which would strictly coerce and constrain his decisions.

During the years of the "Mason Court", a variety of important cases were decided. These included:

- Cole v Whitfield (1988): a landmark decision on the meaning of Constitution section 92. The unanimous judgment observed (par. 7):

No provision of the Constitution has been the source of greater judicial concern or the subject of greater judicial effort than s.92. That notwithstanding, judicial exegesis of the section has yielded neither clarity of meaning nor certainty of operation. Over the years the Court has moved uneasily between one interpretation and another in its endeavours to solve the problems thrown up by the necessity to apply the very general language of the section to a wide variety of legislative and factual situations. Indeed, these shifts have been such as to make it difficult to speak of the section as having achieved a settled or accepted interpretation at any time since federation. The interpretation which came closest to achieving that degree of acceptance was that embodying the criterion of operation formula which we shall subsequently examine in some detail. That formula appeared to have the advantage of certainty, but that advantage proved to be illusory. Its disadvantage was that it was concerned only with the formal structure of an impugned law and ignored its real or substantive effect.

For the first time, the Constitution was interpreted with systematic reference to records of the constitutional conventions of the 1890s in which the text of the Constitution had been agreed (a good edition of the records had recently appeared). The Court also examined not only the "legal" operation of a law (its effects upon legal relations) but also its "practical" operation (its "real or substantive", i.e. social or economic, effects). However, the facts in Cole v Whitfield were relatively simple and the Court soon divided in attempts to apply the criterion of practical operation to more complex facts: Bath v Alston Holdings (1988) and Castlemaine Tooheys v South Australia (1990).

- Polyukhovich v Commonwealth (1991): Mason was in the 4:3 majority who decided, although for a variety of reasons, that retrospective war crimes legislation applying to events in Europe during World War II was a valid exercise of the external affairs power, Constitution section 51(xxix), and was consistent with the judicial power of the Commonwealth, Constitution ch III.
- Mabo v Queensland (No.2) (1992): the colonialist doctrine of terra nullius was superseded by introducing "native title" into Australian law. The decision provoked allegations of "judicial activism", but was soon given statutory form in the Native Title Act 1993 (Cth).
- Australian Capital Television v Commonwealth (1992) and (decided on the same day) Nationwide News v Wills (1992): an important stage in the emergence of a constitutionally implied "freedom of political communication". The Mason Court continued this development until 1994, but it was not to receive unanimous support on the Court until after Mason's departure, in Lange v Australian Broadcasting Corporation (1997). This freedom was considered to be implicit in Constitution sections 7 and 24, which provide that the Commonwealth Parliament shall be "directly chosen by the people". However, the Court has remained reluctant to find further implied freedoms. It has also continued to understand such a "freedom" as a limitation upon legislative power and not, at least directly, a personal freedom or right.
- Dietrich v The Queen (1992): an accused is entitled to publicly funded legal representation where that is necessary to a fair trial (Mason among the majority).
- Minister for Immigration and Ethnic Affairs v Teoh (1995): the high point in Australia of the idea of "legitimate expectation", which Mason favoured although in this and other cases other members of the Court criticised it for illogicality and fictionality. The decision provoked formal ministerial objections, but bills to reverse the precedent failed three times with the calling of a general election. The Court has since considerably reduced the scope of the idea.

After retiring from the High Court, in 1997 Mason was appointed one of the Non-Permanent Judges of the Hong Kong Court of Final Appeal, a position that he held until 2015. He was also President of the Court of Appeal of the Solomon Islands and was a judge on the Supreme Court of Fiji.

In addition to those judicial roles, from 1994 to 1999, Mason served as Chancellor of the University of New South Wales. From 1996 to 1997, he was a professor of legal science at the University of Cambridge and served as Chairman of the National Library of Australia Council from 1995 to 1998. He was also a visiting fellow at the Faculty of Law at the Australian National University.

== Role in the dismissal of Prime Minister Gough Whitlam ==
On 11 November 1975, Governor-General Sir John Kerr summoned Prime Minister Gough Whitlam to his residence and, without warning, handed him a letter dismissing him from office, together with his ministers. Kerr's 1978 autobiography mentions that he had discussed that possibility with Mason but gives no detail.

In 2012, statements in some of Kerr's papers, released by the National Archives following a request by Professor Jenny Hocking, were given publicity in her biography, Gough Whitlam: His Time. Kerr confirms that, in 1975, Mason had advised him on whether the Constitution allows a Governor-General to dismiss a Prime Minister who is unable to obtain supply. Kerr claims that Mason, as well as Chief Justice Sir Garfield Barwick, had advised him that there is such power and that he had followed that advice. In response, on 27 August 2012, Mason published his own account in major newspapers.

Mason's account challenges the accuracy and completeness of Kerr's account in several respects, but most importantly on his advice regarding power to dismiss a Prime Minister. He confirms that, as early as August 1975, he had advised Kerr, as a "close friend", that the Governor-General does have such power. He confirms, as Kerr's autobiography stated (although Kerr's papers give a different impression), that he had only advised Kerr on the available courses of action and had not advised him to pursue the course of dismissal.

Mason also stresses that he had warned Kerr on several occasions, and as late as 9 November 1975, that the Governor-General could exercise that power only after notifying the Prime Minister that he would do so if the Prime Minister did not agree to holding a general election. On 19 November, Mason says, he asked Kerr to ensure that his papers contained that warning, but Kerr did not do so.

However, on 11 November 1975, Kerr dismissed Whitlam summarily. Had Kerr notified Whitlam of his intention, Whitlam could have pre-empted his dismissal by advising the Queen to dismiss Kerr. Mason confirms that Kerr was well aware of the danger of what Kerr referred to as a "race to the Palace". Indeed, Mason says, Kerr had told him that Whitlam had once raised with him the possibility of such a situation.

Mason recounts that, in August, or soon after in 1975, Kerr had been told by a member of the Prime Minister's department that Whitlam was of the view that, if Kerr were to indicate that he might dismiss Whitlam, Whitlam would advise the Queen to dismiss Kerr. Mason states that, at Kerr's request, on 9 November he drafted a letter dismissing Whitlam, although without consulting him further a "very different" text was used.

Mason says that he had declined to provide Kerr with written advice on his powers, particularly because it would be inappropriate for a Justice of the High Court to do so without consulting the Chief Justice. However, at Kerr's request, Chief Justice Barwick did provide written advice, which was that he did have power to dismiss a Prime Minister who could not obtain supply and was unwilling to either resign or agree to a general election.

Mason states that he saw that advice and expressed broad agreement with it. He says that, when Kerr asked him whether, if the matter came to the High Court, Barwick should sit, he had said that he did not know. He says that Kerr did not ask him what his own position would be in that event. But he recalls that he had thought it unlikely that the matter would come to the High Court, which had also been Barwick's advice to Kerr.

Mason's statement ends:

Despite my disagreement with Sir John's account of events and his decision not to warn the prime minister, I consider that Sir John was subjected to unjustified vilification for making the decision which he made. I consider and have always considered that Sir John acted consistently with his duty except in so far as he had a duty to warn the prime minister of his intended action and he did not do so.

== Death ==
Mason died on 17 March 2026, at the age of 100.

== Honours ==
- Commander of the Order of the British Empire (CBE), 1969 Queen's Birthday Honours
- Knight Commander of the Order of the British Empire (KBE), 22 September 1972
- Companion of the Order of Australia (AC), 1988 Australia Day Honours
- Centenary Medal, 1 January 2001
- Grand Bauhinia Medal (GBM), 1 July 2013
- Honorary doctorates in law from ANU, Deakin, Griffith, Melbourne, Monash, Sydney, Hong Kong, Oxford and UNSW universities.
- Invested as an Honorary Fellow (HonFAIB) of the Australian Institute of Building (AIB), by the Honourable Sir Peter Cosgrove AK MC (Retd.) Governor General of Australia and the AIB's National President adjunct Professor Paul Heather AM FAIB FRSN November 2017 at Western Sydney University in the presence of the Chancellor Professor Peter Shergold AC FRSN.
- In 2018 elected as a Fellow of the Royal Society of New South Wales
- In 2019 inducted as a Distinguished Fellow of the Royal Society of New South Wales
- Elected Life Fellow of the Australian Academy of Law.

Legal offices
Preceded by Harry Gibbs	Chief Justice of Australia; 1987–1995	Succeeded by Gerard Brennan
Academic offices
Preceded by Gordon Samuels	Chancellor of the University of New South Wales; 1995–2000	Succeeded by John Yu
