= Owen Dixon =

Australian judge and diplomat (1886–1972)

The Right Honourable Sir Owen Dixon OM GCMG PC
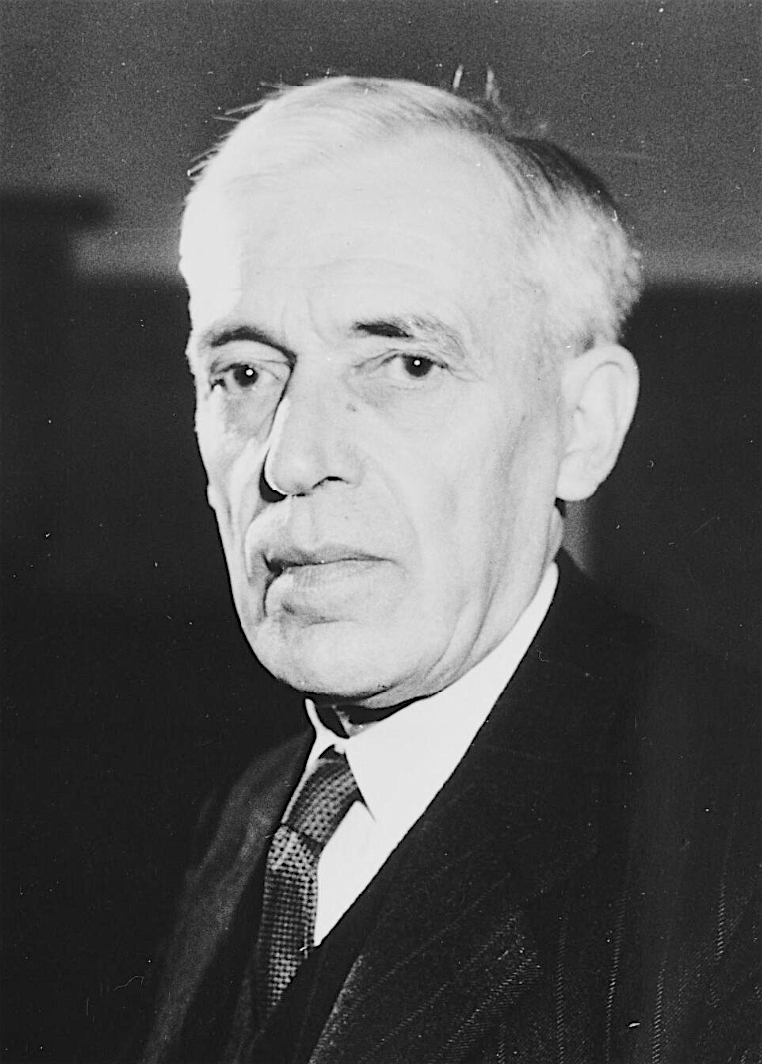
- Dixon in 1950

Chief Justice of Australia
- In office 18 April 1952 – 13 April 1964
- Nominated by: Robert Menzies
- Appointed by: William McKell
- Preceded by: Sir John Latham
- Succeeded by: Sir Garfield Barwick

Justice of the High Court of Australia
- In office 4 February 1929 – 13 April 1964
- Nominated by: Stanley Melbourne Bruce
- Preceded by: H. B. Higgins
- Succeeded by: Sir Alan Taylor

Personal details
- Born: 28 April 1886 Melbourne, Australia
- Died: 7 July 1972 (aged 86) Melbourne, Australia
- Education: University of Melbourne

Sir Owen Dixon (28 April 1886 – 7 July 1972) was an Australian judge and diplomat who served as the sixth Chief Justice of Australia. Many consider him to be Australia's most prominent jurist.

Dixon served as a justice of the High Court for 35 years, including a 12 year period as Chief Justice. He was considered in his time to be one of the world's leading common law jurists, and his judgments reportedly "carried persuasive effect wherever the common law was applied".

In his lifetime, he was showered globally with various honours, including an appointment to the Privy Council, various honours such as the GCMG and Order of Merit, as well as honorary degrees from the university of Oxford, Harvard, Melbourne, and the Australian National University, as well as an award from Yale for "services to mankind".

The British law lord Lord Wilberforce wrote of Dixon: "There is no such thing as substandard Dixon, but from time to time there is Dixon at his superb best."

== Early life and education ==
Dixon was born on 28 April 1886 in Hawthorn, Victoria. He was the son of Edith Annie (née Owen) and Joseph William Dixon, who were both English immigrants originally from Yorkshire. His father was a barrister and solicitor.

Dixon attended Hawthorn College where he was a prize-winning student. He went on to the University of Melbourne, graduating Bachelor of Arts in 1906 and Bachelor of Laws in 1908. During this time, he developed his lifelong love of the classics from his classical philology professor, Thomas George Tucker. He was also influenced by professor of law, William Harrison Moore.

=== Later academic awards ===
Dixon was later awarded honorary doctorates from Oxford, Harvard, and the University of Melbourne.

== Career ==
=== Early career ===
Dixon was admitted to the Victorian Bar in 1909 at the age of 23. In December 1911, he appeared before the High Court of Australia for the first time, aged 25 years. After a slow start, his career became stellar, and he was made a King's Counsel in 1922. In the 1920s, Dixon was a prominent member of the Victorian Bar, along with his colleagues and friends John Latham (who would precede Dixon as Chief Justice of Australia) and Robert Menzies (later the longest serving Prime Minister of Australia). He regularly appeared in the High Court of Australia and the Privy Council in London, including an unsuccessful application for special leave to appeal from the decision of the High Court in the Engineers case. At the time of his appointment to the High Court in 1929, he was the acknowledged leader of the Bar in Victoria, and indeed Australia. In 1919, he married Alice Brooksbank (1891–1969) and they had four children (two sons and two daughters): Franklin (1922–1977), Ted (1924–1994), Betty (1929–2018) and Anne (1934–1979).

=== Judicial career ===
In 1926, Dixon was briefly made an Acting Judge of the Supreme Court of Victoria, and although he was considered to be an excellent judge, he did not enjoy the experience. In 1929, Dixon was appointed to the bench of the High Court, on the recommendation of his friend John Latham, who was then the Commonwealth Attorney-General. During his time on the bench, Dixon also wrote around 18% of the judgments attributed to his colleague, Sir George Rich and 4% of the judgments attributed to Sir Edward McTiernan. (The propriety of one judge writing a judgment under the name of another has not been conclusively determined. However judges swear individual oaths, so they cannot delegate decision-making; they may debate the application or development of legal principles in particular cases with colleagues, but judicial independence includes 'independence from each other'.) Dixon rapidly established himself as a dominant intellectual force on the High Court bench, and many of his judgments from the 1930s and 1940s are still regarded as classic statements of the common law. Examples are McDonald v Dennys Lascelles Ltd (contract terms), Brunker v Perpetual Trustee Company Ltd (gifts, property), Yerkey v Jones (Equity), and Penfolds Wines v Elliott (personal property torts). Dixon also showed that behind his formidable command of legal principle he had a sense of fairness, such as in his joint judgment in Tuckiar v The King, where the Court quashed the murder conviction of an Aboriginal man who had not been given a fair trial.

Dixon had reservations about the appointment of Labor politicians Herbert Vere Evatt and Sir Edward McTiernan by the Government of James Scullin in late 1930 (and is said to have considered resigning in protest). He nevertheless forced himself to get along with all his colleagues, and at one point acted as an intermediary between them and the conservative judge Sir Hayden Starke, who refused to have any direct communication with them. He and Evatt wrote a number of joint judgments prior to Evatt's resignation in 1940 to return to politics.

From 1942 to 1944, Dixon took leave from his judicial duties while he served as Australia's Minister (Ambassador) to the United States, at the request of Prime Minister John Curtin. On 27 May 1950, Dixon was invited by the United Nations to act as their official mediator between the governments of India and Pakistan over the disputed territory of Kashmir. His role was to continue conciliation talks between the two nations in the lead-up to a proposed plebiscite to be put to the residents of Kashmir. His role as mediator ended in October 1950, although he had left India in September frustrated with what he saw as an inability of the respective governments to negotiate.

At about this period, Dixon was in the majority in important constitutional cases which declared unconstitutional pet projects of successive Labor and Liberal governments, namely the Bank Nationalisation Case, and the Communist Party Case. In the former, he considered that many of the operative provisions of the Chifley Government's Banking Act 1947 (which sought to nationalise Australia's banks) were beyond the constitutional powers of the Commonwealth Parliament. In the latter case he considered that the Communist Party Dissolution Act 1950 of the Liberal government led by his old friend Menzies (which sought to ban the Australian Communist Party) could not be supported by any head of Commonwealth legislative power.

In 1951, Dixon was appointed a member of the Privy Council, the English judicial organ which, at that stage, was the final court of appeal in Australian legal matters. However, Dixon never sat on the Privy Council. In fact, Dixon's disdain for the Privy Council is well documented, particularly in Philip James Ayres' biography Owen Dixon. Here, it is revealed that Dixon approached Menzies on at least two occasions, urging a restriction of appeals to the Privy Council. In Dixon's view, the council had a limited understanding of Australian constitutional law, allowed appeals on trivial matters and published confusing judgments. His words to Menzies were "I do not think they have a clue".

In 1952, Dixon was appointed Chief Justice of the High Court by Menzies, who remained Prime Minister throughout Dixon's tenure in the position. This marked the beginning of a period described by Lord Denning as the "golden age" of the High Court. Complemented by the work of Justices Kitto, Fullagar and Windeyer, Dixon led what New South Wales Chief Justice Jim Spigelman has described as "one of the great common law benches of history". This period was one of relative stability in the area of Australian Constitutional Law. This was in part due to Dixon's leadership of his Court, which resulted in a higher proportion of joint judgments than before or since. The most notable decisions from this period include Boilermakers' Case, and the Second Uniform Tax case. As Chief Justice he was also responsible for a number of seminal decisions in areas as diverse as contract law, and criminal law and precedent. In Tait v R he dramatically intervened to prevent the hanging of a mentally ill murderer before his appeal to the High Court could be heard.

In 1952, and again in 1955, Dixon was called upon by the Governor of Victoria to give advice when the upper house of the Parliament of that State refused to pass supply bills. Dixon advised the Governor of his powers in such a situation. This precedent was followed after Dixon's death, when Governor-General Sir John Kerr sought advice from Dixon's successor Sir Garfield Barwick CJ before controversially dismissing the Labor government under Gough Whitlam in 1975.

=== Retirement and later life ===
Dixon maintained an active personal life and was president of the Wallaby Club in 1936–7. He retired from the High Court in 1964, to be replaced by Sir Garfield Barwick. Shortly after his retirement, Dixon turned down an offer to be appointed Australia's Governor-General, because he considered himself "too old". (The post was given, instead, to Lord Casey.) During the early part of his retirement, Dixon read extensively, particularly in the classics, until failing eyesight made this increasingly difficult. In the later 1960s and early 1970s, Dixon's health declined and he died in Melbourne in 1972.

== Assessment ==
Dixon has sometimes been described as a product of his times; for example, he was a strong supporter of the White Australia policy, and was, as Philip James Ayres's biographical work shows, a classicist and rationalist, deeply sceptical in regard to all religions.

With many of the leading Australian politicians in his time, notably Menzies, Dixon had a close working involvement. On occasion he gave advice to federal ministers regarding foreign policy matters. Dixon and his predecessor, Sir John Latham, were consulted by successive national governments on diplomatic and other international missions. Despite this, Dixon is remembered primarily for his attitude of "strict and complete legalism" in his approach to contentious issues and is considered by some to be among the least politically influenced judges his country has ever known.

The phrase occurs in Dixon's speech at his swearing in as Chief Justice in 1952 (emphasis added):

Federalism means a demarcation of powers and this casts upon the court a responsibility of deciding whether legislation is within the boundaries of allotted powers. Unfortunately that responsibility is very widely misunderstood, misunderstood, largely by the popular use and misuse of terms which are not applicable, and it is not sufficiently recognised that the court’s sole function is to interpret a constitutional description of power or restraint upon power and say whether a given measure falls on one side of a line consequently drawn or on the other, and that it has nothing to do with the merits or demerits of the measure.

Such a function has led us all I think to believe that close adherence to legal reasoning is the only way to maintain the confidence of all parties in Federal conflicts. It may be that the court is thought to be excessively legalistic. I should be sorry to think that it is anything else. There is no other safe guide to judicial decisions in great conflicts than a strict and complete legalism.

The line that Dixon draws is between law and politics and does not, as is sometimes thought, represent a commitment to legal formalism. On the contrary, in Australian National Airways Pty Ltd v Commonwealth he had said of constitutional interpretation: "We should avoid pedantic and narrow constructions in dealing with an instrument of government and I do not see why we should be fearful about making implications."

== Honours ==
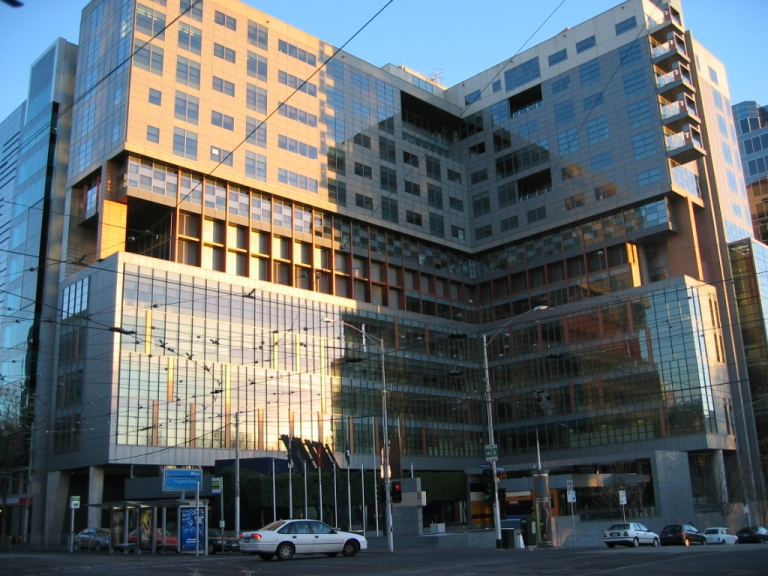
The Owen Dixon Commonwealth Law Courts in Melbourne

- Dixon was made a Knight Commander of the Order of St Michael and St George (KCMG) in 1941, and was elevated to a Knight Grand Cross of that order (GCMG) in 1954.
- The road Owen Dixon Drive in the suburbs of Spence, Evatt and McKellar in Canberra, Australia is named in honour of Sir Owen Dixon.
- The Owen Dixon Commonwealth Law Courts Building, the Melbourne location of the High Court of Australia, the Federal Court of Australia and the Federal Circuit and Family Court of Australia, is named in honour of Sir Owen Dixon.
- Owen Dixon Chambers, in Melbourne, is also named in honour of Sir Owen Dixon.
- Sir Owen Dixon Chambers, in Sydney, is also named in honour of Sir Owen Dixon.

Legal offices
Preceded by Sir John Latham	Chief Justice of Australia; 1952–1964	Succeeded by Sir Garfield Barwick
Diplomatic posts
Preceded by Richard Casey	Australian Ambassador to the United States; 1942–1944	Succeeded by Sir Frederic Eggleston
