= Mary Gaudron =

Australian judge (1943–2026)

The Honourable Mary Gaudron KC
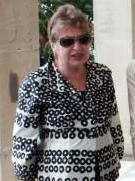
- Gaudron in 2011

Justice of the High Court of Australia
- In office 6 February 1987 – 10 February 2003
- Nominated by: Bob Hawke
- Appointed by: Ninian Stephen
- Preceded by: Anthony Mason
- Succeeded by: Dyson Heydon

Personal details
- Born: Mary Genevieve Gaudron; 5 January 1943 Moree, New South Wales, Australia
- Died: 13 September 2026 (aged 83)
- Spouses: Ben Nurse; John Fogarty
- Children: 2 daughters and 1 son
- Education: University of Sydney

Mary Genevieve Gaudron (5 January 1943 – 13 September 2026) was an Australian lawyer and judge who was the first female Justice of the High Court of Australia. She was the Solicitor-General of New South Wales from 1981 to 1987 before her appointment to the High Court. After her retirement in 2002 she joined the International Labour Organization, serving as the president of its administrative tribunal from 2011 to 2014.

== Early life ==
Mary Genevieve Gaudron was born on 5 January 1943 in Moree in northern rural New South Wales, the daughter of working-class parents Edward and Grace Gaudron. She would later speak about the intense racism towards Indigenous Australians which was part of everyday life in Moree and how it influenced her strong opposition to all forms of discrimination.

In 1951, H. V. Evatt passed through Moree to campaign for the "No" case in the 1951 referendum, at which the Menzies Liberal government was attempting to alter the Constitution of Australia in order to ban the Australian Communist Party. Evatt was addressing a small crowd from the back of a blue Holden Utility, discussing the upcoming referendum and the Constitution. Gaudron, not knowing what Evatt was referring to, asked "Please sir, what's a Constitution?" Evatt explained that it was "the laws by which Parliaments were governed". Gaudron asked whether it was similar to the Ten Commandments and Evatt replied that "you could call it the Ten Commandments of government". Gaudron then asked for a copy and Evatt subsequently sent her one in the mail. Gaudron, expecting two stone tablets, was disappointed to receive only a small pamphlet. However, when the school bullies declared the pamphlet useless, Gaudron retorted that it was of great use to lawyers and that some day she would be one.

== Education ==
Gaudron was educated at St Ursula's College in Armidale. In 1960 Gaudron was awarded a federal government scholarship to study for a Bachelor of Arts degree at the University of Sydney, which she graduated with in 1962. In 1961 she also commenced a part-time Bachelor of Laws degree, graduating in 1965 with first-class honours and the University's Medal for Law. Gaudron was the second female recipient, after Elizabeth Evatt, and the first female part-time student to be awarded the medal.

While studying, Gaudron attempted to obtain articles of clerkship (then five years in duration), but was not successful. She later said, "Many distinguished lawyers took a lot of trouble and effort to explain to me that it was not their policy to take on women as articled clerks."

Instead, she took a job with the Australian Public Service, although, in accordance with the then regulations, she was required to relinquish her employment when she married. In 1988, Gaudron was awarded an honorary doctorate in law from Macquarie University, and another from the University of Sydney in 1999.

== Career ==
=== Barrister ===
Gaudron was admitted to the New South Wales Bar in October 1968 after having completed her articles of clerkship and commenced practice as a barrister. She attempted to buy a room for herself in one of the barristers' chambers in Sydney but was regularly knocked back because she was a woman. When future High Court colleague Michael McHugh attempted to sell his room, the other members of his chambers would not let Gaudron buy it, although there were no other buyers. During her early career as a barrister, she shared chambers with Andrew Cunningham, with whom she remained friends until his death in 2001. She then shared rooms with Janet Coombs, another pioneering female barrister.

Gaudron regularly argued before the Supreme Court of New South Wales and the High Court in the early 1970s, particularly in the area of industrial law. Her first major breakthrough was in 1970 with O'Shaughnessy v Mirror Newspapers Ltd, where as a 27-year-old junior counsel she successfully argued the matter single-handedly before the High Court after the plaintiff, Peter O'Shaughnessy, sacked his senior counsel, Clive Evatt QC, preferring her ability over the veteran. According to O'Shaughnessy, 'she cut a valiant figure, this "slip of a girl", who stood unsupported before the five legal elders of the land. They were obviously impressed by her courage, her sheer elegant dash, her shining intellect finding expression in felicitous language, her good manners, charm, poise. And perhaps, when all is said and done, by her sheer cheek in taking on the case.'

Another one of Gaudron's significant cases was in 1972, when she successfully argued the Equal Pay case for the Whitlam Labor government before the Conciliation and Arbitration Commission.

Early in 1972, Gaudron had entered a bar with a male barrister friend when the waitress informed the friend that the bar did not serve women. Gaudron "patiently explained to the barmaid that my friend didn't want a woman because he'd brought his own", eventually creating "something of a scene" which attracted the attention of Labor politician Clyde Cameron, who said that he didn't realise such sexual discrimination still existed. Gaudron said that "the discrimination being practised in that particular hotel was nothing compared to the discrimination over which he would undoubtedly preside when he became Minister for Industrial Relations after the next election." However, the Whitlam government was elected on 2 December, with Cameron becaming Minister for Industrial Relations, and Whitlam called Gaudron the following day to recruit her to argue the case for equal pay. The case, begun by the Australian Council of Trade Unions and supported by the Whitlam government, extended the reach of the original but limited equal pay decision of 1969. Prior decisions had guaranteed equal pay only for certain specific occupations and later, certain limited industries (industries traditionally considered 'women's work', such as the textile industry), whereas this case extended the principle of equal pay to all workers. Gaudron's argument was based on the principles of the 1951 Equal Remuneration Convention of the International Labour Organization (an organisation she would later work for). However, Gaudron later came to regard her argument, that Australia had not ratified the Convention because the commission would not grant equal pay (thus preventing Australia from fulfilling its obligations under the convention), as somewhat disingenuous, and recalled it with a measure of embarrassment.

=== Conciliation and Arbitration Commission ===
In April 1974, Gaudron was appointed to the Conciliation and Arbitration Commission as Deputy President, becoming the youngest ever federal judge. It was rumoured that Cameron had advocated in Cabinet for her appointment, first by emphasising her outstanding academic record, then by noting her humble working-class background, to which Whitlam supposedly said, "Next you'll be telling us she was born in a bloody manger!"

Gaudron's most notable case on the Arbitration Commission was an important test case for maternity leave in 1979, which laid down award standards allowing for a year's unpaid leave for all full-time and permanent part-time workers. In 1979–1980, Gaudron was the inaugural chair of the NSW Legal Services Commission. Gaudron held the position of Deputy President until her resignation in May 1980.

=== Lecturer, QC and Solicitor-General ===
Gaudron lectured at the University of New South Wales' law school for a brief time, then in February 1981 she was appointed the Solicitor-General of New South Wales, the first female Solicitor-General in any Australian jurisdiction. That same year, she was made a Queen's Counsel (QC), the first female QC in New South Wales. In her capacity as Solicitor-General, Gaudron argued for New South Wales in such landmark High Court cases as the Tasmanian Dams case. From 1981 to 1986, she served on the Council of Macquarie University, and from 1984 to 1986, chaired an advisory council at the University of Wollongong.

=== High Court Justice ===
The death of Justice Lionel Murphy in October 1986 and the retirement of Chief Justice Harry Gibbs in February 1987 created two vacancies on the High Court. On 6 February 1987, John Toohey and Gaudron were appointed to the court. At just 44 years of age, Gaudron was the fourth youngest Justice, after Evatt, McTiernan and Dixon, as well as the first female Justice.

As a High Court Justice, Gaudron contributed to every area of Australian law, most notably to Australian criminal law, in judgments that "combine technical mastery with a general tendency to insist on strict compliance by trial judges with their obligations in directing juries". Gaudron was part of the progressive Mason and Brennan courts, which decided such influential cases as Cole v Whitfield, Dietrich v The Queen, and the Mabo case. Gaudron was consistently opposed to all forms of discrimination, with notable judgments in this vein including the decision in Street v Queensland Bar Association (on Section 117 of the Constitution of Australia) and her joint judgment with Justice McHugh in Castlemaine Tooheys Ltd v South Australia.

Gaudron was generally regarded as not particularly emotive in her writing style, although the judgment for which she is perhaps best remembered popularly was the Mabo case, where, in a joint judgment with Justice Deane, she said that Australia's past treatment of Indigenous Australians was "the darkest aspect of the history of this nation".

The award of Companion of the Order of Australia (AC) was made to six of the seven serving High Court justices in the Bicentennial Australia Day Honours of 1988. Gaudron had declined the award without explanation. She was inducted onto the Victorian Honour Roll of Women in 2001.

On 19 September 1997 Gaudron was appointed the founding Patron of Australian Women Lawyers and continued in this role until 20 February 2009.

=== Retirement ===
On 21 June 2002, Gaudron announced her retirement from the High Court, effective from 10 February 2003. She left the court at the age of just 60, ten years before she reached the mandatory retirement age. Gaudron's early retirement was lamented by all areas of the legal profession. Justice Michael Kirby, who was a close friend of Gaudron, stated several times that her absence left the court with a different character and turned it into "a more blokey place".

In March 2003, Gaudron joined the International Labour Organization (ILO) in Geneva, Switzerland. In 2004 she was a member of an inquiry into trade union rights in Belarus.

Gaudron was also appointed a judge of the ILO's Administrative Tribunal, serving as the president of its administrative tribunal from 2011 to 2014.

== Personal life and death ==
Gaudron had two daughters with her first husband, Ben Nurse. She also had a son with her second husband, John Fogarty.

Gaudron died on 13 September 2026, at the age of 83.

== See also ==
- First women lawyers around the world

Legal offices
Preceded by Gregory Sullivan	Solicitor General for New South Wales; 1981–1987	Succeeded by Keith Mason
