= John Toohey (judge) =

Former justice of the High Court of Australia (1930–2015)

The Honourable John Toohey AC, QC

Justice of the High Court of Australia
- In office 6 February 1987 – 2 February 1998
- Nominated by: Bob Hawke
- Preceded by: Lionel Murphy
- Succeeded by: Ian Callinan

Personal details
- Born: 4 March 1930 Western Australia
- Died: 9 April 2015 (aged 85) Western Australia
- Spouse: Loma Buckenara (m. 1953)

John Leslie Toohey (4 March 1930 – 9 April 2015) was an Australian judge who was a Justice of the High Court of Australia from 1987 to 1998.

== Early life and education ==
Toohey was born in rural Western Australia on 4 March 1930, to Albert and Sylvia Toohey. He was the eldest child, with two younger sisters and a younger brother. He completed his secondary education at St. Louis School (now John XXIII College), a Catholic school in Perth. He studied law and arts at the University of Western Australia. He graduated with first class honours in law in 1950, receiving the FE Parsons Prize (for the most outstanding graduate) and the HCF Keall Prize (for the best fourth year student). He completed his arts degree with first-class honours in 1956.

== Legal career ==
After completing his law degree, Toohey commenced his articles of clerkship at the Perth law firm Lavan & Walsh, and was admitted as a legal practitioner in 1952.

Toohey soon rose to prominence in the Western Australian legal profession, developing expertise in taxation and property law. At the age of 31, he appeared before the High Court in Federal Commissioner of Taxation v Finn, which concerned the deductibility of travelling expenses.

He was a Senior Lecturer in Law at the University of Western Australia from 1957 to 1958, as well as a Visiting Lecturer from 1953 to 1965. He was well known for his lectures in property law.

In December 1966, Toohey commenced practising at the independent bar, becoming the 10th member of the Western Australian Bar Association. In 1968, he was appointed Queen's Counsel. By the early 1970s, he had a busy practice built around criminal law, contract law and property law. In 1972, he appeared in the High Court in Adamson v Hayes, an important case concerning the construction of section 34 of the Property Law Act 1969 (WA). He served as president of the Western Australian Bar Association from 1969 to 1972, and was president of the Law Society of Western Australia from 1972 to 1973.

In 1974, Toohey helped to establish the Port Hedland office of the Aboriginal Legal Service of Western Australia. The following year, he appeared as counsel for the Skull Creek Aboriginal Community in the Laverton Royal Commission investigating the clashes between police and Aboriginal people at Laverton and Skull Creek in December 1974 and January 1975. The Commission's report vindicated the Aboriginal people's version of events and found that police were unable to justify the arrests.

== Judicial career ==
In 1977, Toohey was appointed a justice of the Federal Court of Australia, and, concurrently, a Justice of the Supreme Court of the Northern Territory. In 1980, he was appointed as a Presidential member of the Administrative Appeals Tribunal.

In 1977, he was also appointed as the inaugural Aboriginal Land Commissioner, a position he held until 1982. In his role as Commissioner, Toohey heard claims under the Aboriginal Land Rights (Northern Territory) Act 1976 (Cth). Under the Act, the Commissioner was granted wide statutory powers, and decisions of the Commissioner could be appealed directly to the Full Court of the High Court. During Toohey's term as Commissioner, a number of his decisions were appealed to the High Court:

- R v Toohey; Ex parte Attorney-General (NT);
- R v Toohey; Ex parte Northern Land Council;
- R v Toohey; Ex parte Meneling Station Pty Ltd;

In 1982, at the conclusion of his term as Aboriginal Land Commissioner, he returned to Perth to work full-time in his role as Federal Court judge.

In 1985, Toohey was appointed as a member of the Constitutional Commission, a body formed by the Commonwealth Government in the same year to carry out a fundamental review of the Australian Constitution.

Toohey continued to work as a Federal Court judge until 1987, when he was appointed to the High Court of Australia, replacing Justice Lionel Murphy. He was sworn in as a Justice on 6 February 1987, the same day that Sir Anthony Mason was sworn in as Chief Justice and Mary Gaudron was sworn in as a Justice. Together with Justices Brennan, Deane and Dawson, they were part of the Mason Court, the membership of which was remarkably stable (with only one change, from Justice Wilson to McHugh, occurring in 1989) between 1987 and Mason's retirement in 1995.

Toohey retired from the bench in February 1998. After his retirement, Toohey served as a judge in the judicial system of Kiribati and as a justice of the Supreme Court of Fiji.

He became a visiting professor in Law at the University of Western Australia. In September 2000 he was appointed to be one of the three independent members of the Bloody Sunday Inquiry (chaired by Lord Saville) into the events of 30 January 1972 in Derry, Northern Ireland (replacing New Zealander Sir Edward Somers QC, who retired for personal reasons).

He died peacefully at home on 9 April 2015.

== Honours ==
Toohey was made an Officer of the Order of Australia in 1986, which was advanced to a Companion of the Order of Australia two years later, in 1988 (AC). Also in 1988, Toohey was awarded an honorary doctorate in laws from Murdoch University in Perth, Western Australia. He was awarded the Centenary Medal in 2001.
