= Daryl Dawson =

Australian judge

The Honourable Sir Daryl Dawson AC, KBE, CB, KC

Justice of the High Court of Australia
- In office 30 July 1982 – 15 August 1997
- Nominated by: Malcolm Fraser
- Appointed by: Ninian Stephen
- Preceded by: Sir Keith Aickin
- Succeeded by: Kenneth Hayne

Personal details
- Born: 12 December 1933 (age 92) Melbourne, Victoria, Australia
- Education: Canberra High School
- Alma mater: University of Melbourne; Yale University

Sir Daryl Michael Dawson (born 12 December 1933) is an Australian former judge who served as a justice of the High Court of Australia from 1982 to 1997. Before being appointed to the High Court, he served for periods as a legal officer in the Royal Australian Navy and as Solicitor-General of Victoria.

== Early life and education ==
Dawson was born in Melbourne but raised in Canberra, where he attended Canberra High School. He completed his undergraduate education at the University of Melbourne, living at Ormond College and received a Bachelor of Laws with honours. He later completed a Master of Laws at Yale University on a Fulbright Scholarship.

== Career ==
=== Legal career ===
Dawson was admitted to the Victorian Bar in 1957 (and later to the Tasmanian Bar in 1972). In the 1960s, he served as a commander in the Royal Australian Navy's legal service in Melbourne, holding the rank of lieutenant commander in the Naval Reserve. He was appointed a Queen's Counsel in 1971, and served as the Solicitor-General of Victoria from 1974 to 1982.

=== Judicial career ===
Dawson was a member of the Australian Motor Sport Appeal Court from 1974 to 1986, and was the chairman of this court in 1987. In 1982, he was appointed a justice of the High Court of Australia, a position he held until retiring on 15 August 1997. During his tenure, he earned the nickname Dissenting Dawson, being the only dissenting justice in the landmark cases of Mabo v Queensland and Commercial Bank of Australia Ltd v Amadio. He was notably the only justice in Australian Capital Television v Commonwealth to argue there was no implied freedom of political communication in the Australian Constitution, although he revised his position on this issue in Lange v Australian Broadcasting Corporation.

From 1997 until 2003, Dawson served as a non-permanent judge of the Hong Kong Court of Final Appeal. In 1998, he became a director and chairman of the Menzies Foundation. Dawson is currently a professorial fellow at the Melbourne Law School, and an adjunct professor at Monash University.

Dawson was appointed a Companion of the Order of the Bath (CB) for public service in the 1980 Birthday Honours, and a Knight Commander of the Order of the British Empire (KBE) in 1982.

=== Post-judicial activities ===
Dawson headed a Royal Commission into the 1998 explosion at a natural gas processing plant at Longford, which killed two people and crippled Victoria's energy supply for weeks.

He occasionally adjudicates mooting competitions at the University of Melbourne.

== Honours ==
In the 1980 Birthday Honours, Dawson was made a Companion of the Order of the Bath (CB). Dawson was knighted in 1982, becoming a Knight Commander of the Order of the British Empire (KBE), and known formally as Sir Daryl Dawson. In 1986, Dawson was made a Companion of the Order of Australia; at the time, Australia's highest civilian honour. In 2006, he was awarded a Doctor of Laws (honoris causa) from Monash University, with the University of Melbourne conferring the same award.
