= Gerard Brennan =

Australian judge (1928–2022)

The Honourable Sir Gerard Brennan AC KBE GBS QC

Chief Justice of Australia
- In office 21 April 1995 – 21 May 1998
- Nominated by: Paul Keating
- Appointed by: Bill Hayden
- Preceded by: Anthony Mason
- Succeeded by: Murray Gleeson

Justice of the High Court of Australia
- In office 12 February 1981 – 21 April 1995
- Appointed by: Malcolm Fraser
- Preceded by: Harry Gibbs
- Succeeded by: William Gummow

Personal details
- Born: Francis Gerard Brennan; 22 May 1928 Rockhampton, Queensland, Australia
- Died: 1 June 2022 (aged 94)
- Spouse: Patricia O'Hara (m. 1953; died 2019)
- Children: 7, including Frank

Sir Francis Gerard Brennan (22 May 1928 – 1 June 2022) was an Australian lawyer and jurist who served as the 10th Chief Justice of Australia. As a judge in the High Court of Australia, he wrote the lead judgement on the Mabo decision, which gave rise to the Native Title Act.

== Early life and education ==
Brennan was born on 22 May 1928, in Rockhampton, Queensland. He was the son of Frank Tenison Brennan, a Labor Party politician, lawyer and judge of the Supreme Court of Queensland. He was raised as, and continued to be, a Catholic and has said: "Egalitarianism, tolerance and the respect for conscience are the practical manifestations of faith, hope and charity."

== Career ==
Prime Minister Malcolm Fraser appointed Brennan to the court in 1981. As a High Court judge, Brennan wrote the lead judgement on the Mabo decision, which overturned the doctrine of terra nullius used to justify the Crown's sovereignty over Australia, replacing it with the doctrine of native title, and thus protecting Aboriginal people's claims to land. This decision eventually gave rise to the Native Title Act. Brennan is also notable for his landmark judgement in Waltons v Maher, which established equitable estoppel as a cause of action in itself.

He was appointed by prime minister Paul Keating to become the 10th Chief Justice of Australia in 1995.

== After retirement ==
Following his retirement from the High Court, Brennan was a non-permanent judge of the Hong Kong Court of Final Appeal (2000-2012) and an external judge of the Supreme Court of Fiji (1999–2000), chancellor of the University of Technology Sydney (1998–2004) and Foundation Scientia Professor of Law at the University of New South Wales (1998). He was an honorary visiting professor of law at the University of New South Wales.

In a 2001 exchange of letters with Archbishop George Pell, he defended the primacy of conscience over obedience to authority.

In June 2021, Brennan intervened in a public debate over a family of asylum seekers, supporting the family with a letter in major newspapers. It begins:

Are other Australians ashamed, as I am? How can Australia, proud of our freedoms, respectful of all our peoples, and insistent on human dignity, inflict cruelty on Australian children as a means of achieving a goal of government policy?

== Personal life and death ==
In 1953, Brennan married Patricia O'Hara. Lady Brennan died on 3 September 2019. Their first child, Frank Brennan, born in 1954, became a Jesuit priest, a human rights lawyer and an advocate for the rights of Aboriginal peoples. He is known for his involvement in the Wik debate when Paul Keating referred to him as "the meddling priest". Their second child, Madeline Brennan KC, is a barrister in Brisbane and has served as a director of a number of Catholic health and education providers. Their third child Dr Anne Brennan is a psychiatrist who came to prominence in the Barrett Adolescent Centre Commission of Inquiry. Their fourth child Tom Brennan SC is a barrister in Sydney. A son Paul was CEO of Polynovo Ltd an ASX listed biotechnology manufacturer until his resignation in 2021. A daughter, Bernadette, is the author of renowned literary biographies This Writing Life: Helen Garner and her Work; and Leaping into Waterfalls: The Enigmatic Gillian Mears.

Brennan died on 1 June 2022 in Sydney, aged 94, two days before Mabo Day and the 30th anniversary of the Mabo decision.

== Honours ==
In 1981, Brennan was appointed a Knight Commander of the Order of the British Empire and, in 1988, appointed a Companion of the Order of Australia in recognition of his service to the law.

Brennan was awarded honorary degrees by the University of Melbourne (Hon. LL.D.), the University of Technology, Sydney (Hon. LL.D.), the University of Queensland (Hon. LL.D.), Griffith University (Hon. D.Univ.), Central Queensland University (Hon. D.Litt.), Trinity College Dublin (Hon. LL.D.) and the Australian Catholic University (Hon LL.D). He was a life fellow of the Australian Academy of Law. He served as chancellor of the University of Technology, Sydney, from 1998 to 2004.

In 2013, Brennan was awarded the Gold Bauhinia Star by the Chief Executive of Hong Kong.

Legal offices
Preceded by Sir Anthony Mason	Chief Justice of Australia; 1995–1998	Succeeded by Murray Gleeson
Academic offices
Preceded by none	Chancellor of the University of Technology Sydney; 1998–2004	Succeeded by Vicki Sara
