= Comcare v Banerji =

Judgement of the High Court of Australia

- Court: High Court of Australia
- Decided: 7 August 2019
- Citation: [2019] HCA 23
- Transcripts: [2019] HCATrans 51 [2018] HCATrans 50

Case history
- Prior action: [2018] AATA 892

Court membership
- Judges sitting: Kiefel CJ, Bell, Gageler, Keane, Nettle, Gordon & Edelman JJ

Case opinions
- (7:0) Appeal allowed – the provisions of the Public Service Act (1999) did not impose an unjustified burden on the implied freedom, and that the termination of the respondent’s employment was not unlawful
- Decision by: Kiefel CJ, Bell, Keane, Nettle JJ
- Concurrence: Gageler J, Gordon J, Edelman J

Comcare v Banerji is a decision of the High Court of Australia. It was an appeal brought by Comcare against former public servant Michaela Banerji, seeking to overturn a decision of the Administrative Appeals Tribunal. The tribunal had declared that termination of her employment was not a reasonable administrative action once regard was had to the implied freedom of political communication.

The court ruled unanimously that provisions of the Public Service Act 1999 (Cth), regarding the termination of a public servant's employment, did not contravene the implied freedom of political communication. It further ruled that the decision to terminate her employment based on her use of an anonymous Twitter account was not otherwise unlawful.

== Factual Background ==
Banerji was a public servant at the Australian Human Rights Commission, which later became part of the then-named Department of Immigration and Citizenship (DIAC). In 2012, she began to use an anonymous Twitter account to criticize DIAC, its employees and policies, as well as the immigration policies of both major parties. After a series of investigations the identity of the Twitter user was discovered and in October 2012 a delegate of the departmental secretary determined that Banerji had breached the APS Code of Conduct and recommended the sanction of termination of employment.

After Banerji was terminated, she made a claim for compensation for a workplace injury for depression and anxiety caused by the termination. The Department rejected this claim on the basis that the termination was a reasonable administrative action (an exclusion provided by s5A(1) of the Safety, Rehabilitation and Compensation Act 1988 (Cth).

The respondent applied for review of the decision at the Administrative Appeals Tribunal, arguing that the exclusion did not apply because the provisions used to terminate her employment within the Public Service Act were in breach of the implied freedom of political communication, and thus unconstitutional. Additionally, Banerji argued that the implied freedom was a mandatory consideration in the exercise of delegate's discretion to terminate her employment under s15 of the Act and that their failure to consider it meant the decision was in jurisdictional error.

== Decision ==
The High Court unanimously allowed the appeal, rejecting the respondent's arguments. By majority, Kiefel CJ, Bell, Keane and Nettle JJ rejected Banerji's argument that the impugned provisions could not extend to 'anonymous' communications. They then held that the provisions did not impose an unjustified burden on the implied freedom, and that the termination of the respondent's employment was not unlawful. Finally, the court held that the implied freedom was not a mandatory consideration for the decision maker, as the law was both constitutional, and it already contained a requirement that the decision maker act reasonably. However, the court cautioned that the implied freedom may still be a relevant mandatory consideration, in the exercise of different discretion under other legislation.

The court commented on Banerji's submissions to say that:

"the respondent's implied freedom argument amounts in effect to saying that, despite the fact that her conduct in broadcasting the "anonymous" tweets was conduct which failed to uphold the APS Values and the integrity and good reputation of the APS, Parliament was precluded from proscribing the conduct because its proscription imposed an unjustified burden on the implied freedom of political communication. To say the least, that is a remarkable proposition." (per Kiefel CJ, Bell, Keane, Nettle JJ)

=== Application of Freedom of Political Communication proportionality test ===
In making their finding that the provisions did not create an unjustified burden on the implied freedom, the majority applied the legal test from Lange v ABC, as it was stated in Clubb v Edwards, earlier in 2019. This involved an inquiry as to the law's effective burden on the freedom and the law's purpose, before an evaluation as to whether the law complied with a three-stage freedom of political communication proportionality test. The court's findings were as follows:

1. Did the law impose an effective burden on the implied freedom of political communication?
  The court found that 'a law which prohibits or limits political communication to any extent will generally be found to impose an effective burden on the implied freedom of political communication'.
  The Commonwealth conceded that the sections of the Public Service Act in question did impose an effective burden.
2. Did the laws have a legitimate purpose?
  The court found that the main objects of the act, which included the establishment of 'an apolitical public service that is efficient and effective in serving the Government, the Parliament and the Australian public', among other purposes; is a 'significant purpose consistent with the representative and responsible government mandated by the Constitution'. Therefore, the law passed this stage of the test.
3. Were the laws appropriate and adapted or proportionate to the achievement of a legitimate purpose consistent with the system of representative and responsible government?
  The court restated the Clubb v Edwards formulation of the 'appropriate and adapted' stage of the test, as consisting of analysis as to whether the law is 'suitable, necessary, and adequate in its balance'. The evaluation of the statute under the three-stage proportionality test was performed by the majority as follows:
  1. Suitable
    The court explained that a law is 'suitable' if it exhibits a 'rational connection to its purpose', and that 'a law exhibits such a connection' if it provides for a means of realizing that purpose. The majority found that:
    'it is most desirable if not essential that management and staffing decisions within the APS be capable of being made on a basis that is independent of the party political system, free from political bias, and uninfluenced by individual employees' political beliefs. The requirement imposed on employees of the APS by ss 10(1) and 13(11) of the Public Service Act, at all times to behave in a way that upholds the APS Values and the integrity and good reputation of the APS represents a rational means of realizing those objectives and thus of maintaining and protecting an apolitical and professional public service. The impugned provisions are suitable in the necessary sense.'
    It was found therefore that the relevant sections of the Public Service Act passed the test of suitability.
  2. Necessity
    The court explained that where a law has a 'significant purpose consistent with the system of representative and responsible government', it will not usually be regarded as lacking in necessity unless there is an 'obvious and compelling alternative' which is 'equally practicable and available and would result in a significantly lesser burden on the implied freedom'. The court interpreted Banerji's arguments that the laws were an unjustified burden, by proscribing anonymous communications; to be a submission that an obvious and compelling alternative would be to exclude anonymous communications from the scope of the law's application. The court rejected that implicit submission from Banerji, and expressed that Banerji's assumption that anonymous communications were more deserving of protection than open communications; 'was not necessarily sound'. The law was therefore found to have passed the Necessity stage of the test.
  3. Adequacy in balance
    Finally, the court explained that a law 'is regarded as adequate in its balance, unless the benefit sought to be achieved by the law is manifestly outweighed by its adverse effect on the implied freedom'. The court found that the penalties that could be imposed under Section 15 of the Public Service Act, (including the sanction of termination of employment) did 'not suggest that the impugned provisions are not adequate in their balance.' The impugned provisions were found to have presented as 'a plainly reasoned and focused response to the need (of enforcing APS values)' and 'trespassed no further upon the implied freedom than is reasonably justified'.

As the law was found to have survived each stage of the legal test, Banerji's arguments that the law was unconstitutional were rejected by the majority.

== Aftermath ==
The decision was criticized by the Community and Public Sector Union national secretary Nadine Flood, describing the case as "one of the most important cases on the implied freedom of political communication of recent years". She said "People working in Commonwealth agencies should be allowed normal rights as citizens, rather than facing Orwellian censorship because of where they work".

Kieran Pender of The Canberra Times described the decision as 'no surprise', writing that:

"Even in the United States, that bastion of free speech with its robust First Amendment, the ability of government employees to engage in political debate is limited. American judge Oliver Wendell Holmes once quipped: 'The petitioner may have a constitutional right to talk politics, but he has no constitutional right to be a policeman.' That just about sums up the High Court's judgment in Comcare v Banerji."

== Significance ==
The Banerji decision was the first time a High Court majority explicitly included the word 'proportionate' as part of the Lange test. That development is relevant to academic and judicial debates about the role of proportionality testing in Australian constitutional law. The concept of proportionality testing is borrowed from German jurisprudence (a civil jurisdiction).

The case along with Brown v Tasmania, and Clubb v Edwards, also collectively marks a point of stability for Australian free speech jurisprudence. These cases have only altered the freedom of political communication test in minor ways since reformulation in McCloy v NSW.

It is also an important case for Australia's public service. It is authority for the Commonwealth being allowed to sanction the political speech of public servants without needing even to regard the freedom of political communication doctrine when determining sanctions for such conduct.

== See also ==
- Public Service Act 1999 (Cth)

US jurisprudence

- Pappas v. Giuliani
