= Implied freedom of political communication =

Implied right within the Constitution of Australia

At the Commonwealth level in Australia, there is no explicitly stated protection for freedom of expression in legislation nor the Australian Constitution. (Note: The Australian Capital Territory, Victoria and Queensland have passed human rights legislation which protects freedom of expression at the State level, but the protection may not be entrenched.) (Note: Commonwealth legislation passed in accordance with Section 51 of the Constitution - which conflicts with any State legislation, including human rights charters - will override the State legislation to the extent of the inconsistency, as per Section 109 of the Constitution.) Instead, the Constitution implies a freedom of political communication through an interpretation of Section 7 and Section 24. The principle was established by High Court rulings in 1992.

The implied freedom of political communication is explicitly referenced in multiple, Commonwealth statutes.

The implied freedom of political communication serves as a negative right, since it restricts the legislative power of Commonwealth and State parliaments.

The McCloy v New South Wales case refined a proportionality test, for assessing a law's compatibility with the implied freedom of political communication.

== Background ==
The Constitution of Australia contains no provision expressly guaranteeing freedom of speech, or most other rights comparable to the United States Bill of Rights. Many of the delegates to the constitutional conventions considered that such protections were unnecessary or even insulting toward Australian parliaments, and in some cases were concerned that they would undermine existing laws discriminating against racial minorities.

In 1942, H. V. Evatt proposed an amendment to the Australian constitution to grant sweeping powers to the Commonwealth government for post-war reconstruction, which also would have enshrined the Four Freedoms, including freedom of speech. A pared back version of the amendment which would also only have effect for five years after the end of the war was put to a referendum in 1944. The campaign mostly focused on the powers to be granted to the Commonwealth government, and the referendum was defeated.

Australian Constitutional Law expert, Professor Emerita Anne Twomey, presented the 1988 High Court case Davis v Commonwealth – in which a law concerning slogans about Australia's bicentenary of European colonisation was partially invalidated due to impacts on freedom of expression – as an indirect precursor to the implied freedom of political communication.

=== Proposed amendment ===
As of 2025, Gerard Rennick People First, Pauline Hanson's One Nation and the Libertarian Party have proposed policies to hold a referendum on enshrining freedom of speech in the Australian Constitution.

== Court cases ==
The following legal cases illustrate the extent to which the implied freedom of political communications does, and does not, apply.

=== Related High Court decisions ===
- Nationwide News Pty Ltd v Wills (1992)
- Australian Capital Television Pty Ltd v Commonwealth (1992)
- Theophanous v Herald & Weekly Times Ltd (1994)
- Levy v Victoria
- Lange v Australian Broadcasting Corporation (1997)
- Mulholland v Australian Electoral Commission
- Coleman v Power (2004)
- McCloy v New South Wales
- Monis v The Queen (2013)
- Unions NSW and Ors v State of New South Wales
- Tajjour v New South Wales
- Brown v Tasmania (2017)
- Comcare v Banerji
- Clubb v Edwards (2019)
- Spence v State of Queensland
- Ruddick v Commonwealth of Australia
- Babet v Commonwealth of Australia (2025)
- Ravbar v Commonwealth of Australia
- The Digital Freedom Project Incorporated v. Commonwealth (2025)
- Farmer v Minister for Home Affairs & Anor
- Hopper v Victoria (2026)
- White Australia Party v Commonwealth (2026)

The implied freedom of political communication can also be invoked by state supreme courts, allowing them to invalidate or uphold state legislation, as evidenced below.

=== Related NSW Supreme Court decisions ===
- Jarrett v State of New South Wales
- Lees v State of New South Wales
- Kvelde v State of New South Wales

=== Related Supreme Court of Victoria decision ===
- Cotterill v Romanes

== See also ==
- Australian constitutional law
- Australian Communist Party v Commonwealth – Judgement of the Australian High Court
- Democratic backsliding – Drift towards authoritarianism
- Roach v Electoral Commissioner – Judgement of the Australian High Court
- Rowe v Electoral Commissioner – Judgement of the Australian High Court
