= Defamation in Australia =

In Australia, defamation refers to the body of law that aims to protect individuals, groups, and entities from false or damaging statements that may cause harm to their reputation or standing in society. Australian defamation law is defined through a combination of common law and statutory law. Between 2014 and 2018, Australia earned the title of “world defamation capital”, recording 10 times as many libel claims as the UK on a per-capita basis.

Australia's common law is nationally uniform, and so principles and remedies for defamation are broadly consistent across the States and Territories. However, the application of local statutes result in slight differences in application amongst those jurisdictions.

== Background ==
Australia's defamation law emerged from English common law, but has since evolved in application though statute and judicial decisions. To the extent Australia's system retains commonalities with English law, UK jurisprudence retains value as providing guidance to Australian courts.

One key tension in Australia is a need for defamation law to strike an appropriate balance between the protection of an individual's reputation and values relating to free speech; as well as constitutional protections of political communication. Many of the complexities that arise from defamation proceedings are said to derive from judicial attempts to maintain that balance. The decision of Lange v ABC is an example of a case where Australia's constitutional free speech protections were assessed in the context of a defamation proceeding.

=== Statutory reform ===
In 2005, the Australian states and territories agreed to adopt uniform defamation laws in order to promote consistency across jurisdictions. These laws came into effect on January 1, 2006, and have largely harmonized the defamation laws throughout Australia. However, some minor differences between jurisdictions remain, particularly in relation to procedural matters. One of the major outcomes of the reforms was that all defendants would be able to defend a defamation case on the basis of truth alone. Prior to the legislative changes, New South Wales and Tasmania required both truth and a public interest test for a defence to apply.

The uniform regime from 2005 has since been modified occasionally by Australia's States, usually in an agreed upon and uniform manner. In 2021, a 'serious harm' threshold test was introduced in all jurisdictions except Western Australia and the Northern Territory. Additional reforms included a new public interest defence, a 'single publication rule' to address limitation period issues for material published online, limitations on damages for non-economic loss, and legal recognition of apologies made by a wrongful party.

=== Proposed Defamation Reforms (2024) ===
Australia is set to undergo further significant changes to its defamation laws, with proposed reforms expected to commence on 1 January 2024. These amendments to the Defamation Act 2005 come in the wake of reforms that began on 1 July 2021. Recognizing the rapid technological advancements, especially the rise of social media and internet search engines, these reforms aim to modernize defamation laws. Two landmark cases, Fairfax Media Publications Pty Ltd v Voller & Ors [2021] HCA 27 and Google LLC v Defteros [2022] HCA 27, highlighted the need for clearer laws regarding the liability of digital intermediaries in defamation. The proposed reforms introduce a new 'innocent dissemination' defense for intermediaries, such as search engines, that unintentionally host defamatory material. This defense is contingent upon the intermediary providing a mechanism for complaint submissions and adhering to it. Intermediaries can also offer "prevention steps" as a form of amends, which includes actions like removing or blocking the defamatory content.

== Elements, defences, and remedies ==
For a defamation action to succeed in Australia, a plaintiff must be able to prove four things:

(1) The communication must have been published to a third party (Note: Publication can occur in various forms, including written, spoken, or electronic communication.)

(2) The communication must identify, or be about the plaintiff. (Note: This does not necessarily require the explicit naming of the plaintiff, as long as a reasonable person could identify the plaintiff from the statement.)

(3) The communication must be defamatory.

(4) The plaintiff must prove that the publication has caused (or likely to cause) serious harm.

The test for whether a communication is defamatory in Australia is: 'does the communication lower/harm the plaintiff's reputation, hold the plaintiff up to ridicule, or lead others to shun and avoid the plaintiff?' and is judged from the viewpoint of an 'ordinary reasonable people in the community in general' and in light of contemporary standards. It is irrelevant whether this meaning is direct or implied.

Several defences are available to defamation actions in Australia. Some of these defences are grounded in statute, whereas others are common law defences.

Defences available under the Defamation Act include: justification, contextual truth, absolute privilege, (Note: Applies to statements made in the course of parliamentary proceedings, judicial proceedings, or other protected occasions, where the maker of the statement cannot be held liable for defamation) qualified privilege, (Note: Applies when the defendant has a legal, moral, or social duty to publish the defamatory statement, and the recipient has a corresponding interest in receiving it. This defence is defeated if the plaintiff can prove that the defendant acted with malice) fair report on proceedings of public concern, publication of matter concerning an issue of public interest, honest opinion, scientific or academic peer review, and innocent dissemination. A partial defence to liability is also available in instances where a defendant has offered an apology or to make amends.

In addition to the statutory defences, common law defences include the Lange defence, (Note: The impact of Australia's constitutional free speech protections is explained in Lange v Australian Broadcasting Corp (1997) 180 CLR 520) consent, and the common law variant of justification.

Remedies available if a defamation action is successfully pleaded include damages, injunctions, and in some instances an apology or retraction.

== Concerns notice ==
The uniform defamation laws in Australia, which aim to unify defamation legislation across the country, all mandate the submission of a concerns notice by an aggrieved party to the alleged defamer. This notice must detail the specific defamatory statements and the serious harm caused.

The giving of a concerns notice is compulsory, and a pre-requisite to commencing defamation proceedings. Section 12B(1) of the Defamation Act states:

(1) An aggrieved person cannot commence defamation proceedings unless—

(a) the person has given the proposed defendant a concerns notice in respect of the matter concerned; and

(b) the imputations to be relied on by the person in the proposed proceedings were particularised in the concerns notice; and

(c) the applicable period for an offer to make amends has elapsed.

An aggrieved person cannot commence defamation proceedings unless they have given the proposed defendant a concerns notice.

In Hooper v Catholic Family Services, the plaintiff’s defamation claim was dismissed because they had failed to comply with the relevant requirements of a concerns notice. This procedural non-compliance with the necessary pre-filing requirements led to the summary dismissal of the defamation aspects of the claim.

The Court said at [85]:

In my view, the various deficiencies identified by Mr Ward, which can be summarised as follows … The failure to serve a concerns notice prior to institution of proceedings; and The failure to provide specifics of the actual defamatory imputations made against Ms Mannik and Ms Jones … are of such fatal moment to Ms Hooper’s defamation action that the only conclusion which is open to the Court is that these aspects of her claim have no prospects of success because of their incurable deficiencies.

== See also ==
- Canadian defamation law
- Defamation Law in the United States
- English defamation law
- Tort law in Australia
