= Lewis v ACT =

Legal case in the High Court of Australia

- Court: High Court of Australia
- Full case name: Lewis v Australian Capital Territory
- Decided: 5 August 2020
- Citation: [2020] HCA 26

Case history
- Prior action: [2019] ACTCA 16

Court membership
- Judges sitting: Kiefel CJ, Keane, Gageler, Gordon & Edelman JJ

Case opinions
- appeal dismissed with costs (Kiefel, Keane JJ) (Gageler J) (Gordon J) (Edelman J)

Lewis v ACT is a decision of the High Court of Australia. The decision is a significant Australian Tort Law ruling for its holdings on the role of damages.

The court unanimously ruled that a purported category of damages called "vindicatory damages" are not recognised as a distinct form of common law damages in Australia, as distinct from existing heads of damage such as nominal or compensatory damages.

== Factual Background ==
The appellant, Lewis, was sentenced to 12 month's imprisonment for an assault occasioning bodily harm. His sentence was to be served by a scheme in place at the time in the ACT, whereby he would be subject to periodic detention on weekends. He failed on four occasions to attend the periodic detention in the manner required. He was then notified by the Sentence Administration Board of an inquiry, which he did not attend. The board cancelled Lewis' periodic detention, and he was arrested and imprisoned as a result.

Lewis successfully challenged the decision to cancel his periodic detention through litigation, on the basis he had been denied procedural fairness. Lewis was granted bail pending the hearing of that challenge, and never served his initial sentence of periodic detention.

Lewis subsequently sought damages from the Australian Capital Territory for false imprisonment, for the 82 days of imprisonment he served before being granted bail. The primary judge Refshauge J assessed that damages for a false imprisonment of this kind would ordinarily be set at $100,000; but ordered that only nominal damages should be awarded. That was because the judge found that even if Lewis had not been denied procedural fairness; he would have inevitably been imprisoned full-time upon the cancellation of his periodic detention anyway. In other words, the denial of procedural fairness did not cause Lewis a loss to be compensated for with damages.

Lewis then appealed to the High Court, asking for substantial damages of $100,000 to be awarded against the ACT for his 82 days of imprisonment.

== The Decision ==
The court stated that two questions arose from the appeal. The first was whether Lewis could 'recover substantial damages for the tort of false imprisonment, simply to vindicate his rights irrespective of whether he has suffered any loss, and without an award of exemplary damages'. The court ruled that he could not, as vindicatory damages are not recognised as form of damages in Australia.

The second question was 'whether he could recover substantial damages for the adverse consequences he suffered, from the same imprisonment that would have occurred lawfully; even if the wrongful act had not occurred'. The court found that he could not.

== See also ==
- False imprisonment
