= Lucas Heights Conservation Area =

Conservation area in southern Sydney, New South Wales

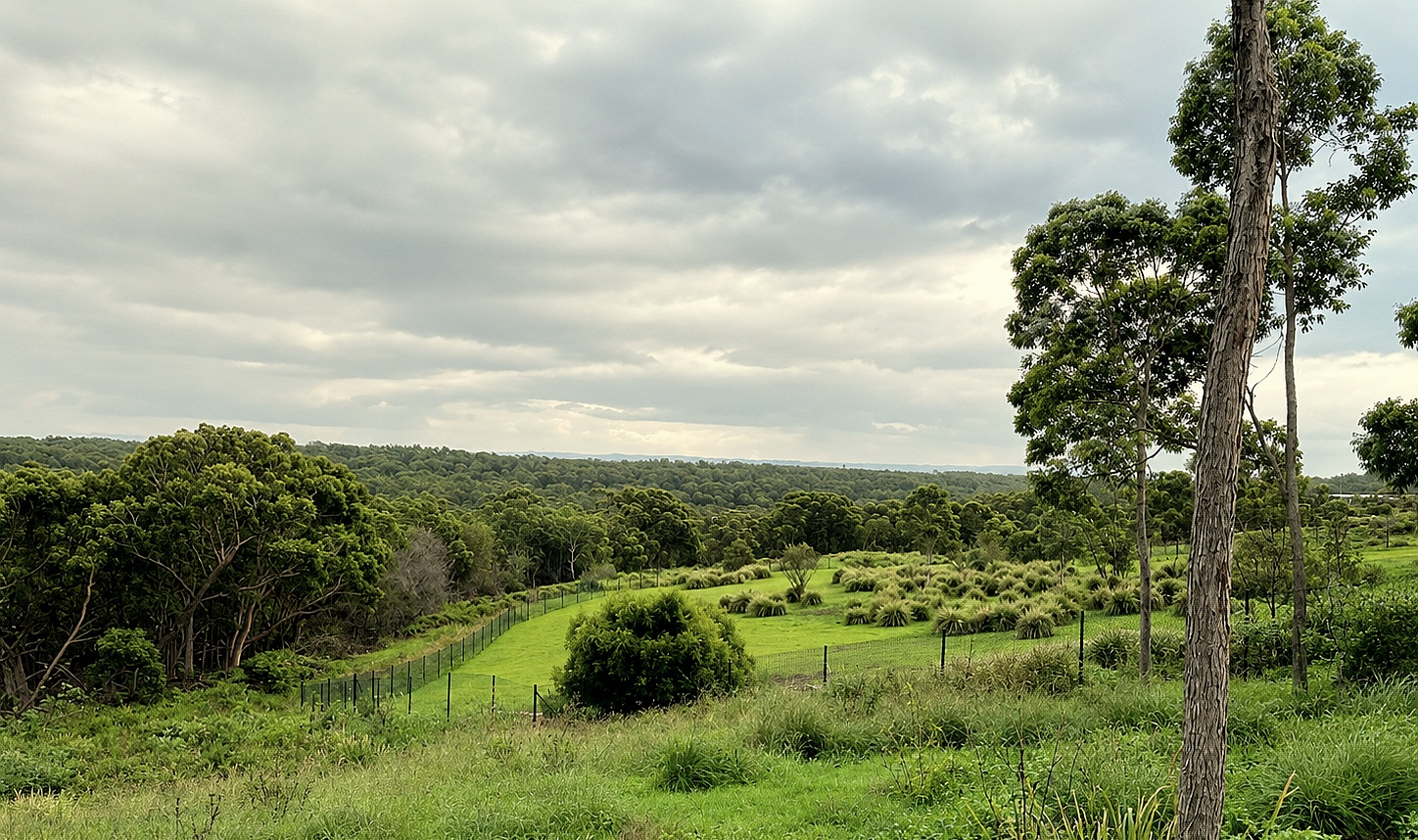
- The reserve in the background, viewed from the east at Barden Ridge
- Interactive map of Lucas Heights Conservation Area
- Location: Lucas Heights and Menai, New South Wales, Australia
- Nearest city: Sydney
- Coordinates: 34.035°S 150.976°E
- Area: 111.7 ha (276 acres)
- Established: 2002
- Governing body: Sutherland Shire Council

The Lucas Heights Conservation Area (LHCA) is a protected bushland area at Lucas Heights and near Menai, in the Sutherland Shire of southern Sydney, New South Wales, Australia. The council-managed conservation area covers approximately 111.7 hectares (276 acres) and lies directly north of the Lucas Heights Resource Recovery Park, near Heathcote Road.

The conservation area forms part of a larger tract of bushland in the Mill Creek catchment and contains sandstone woodland, heath, sedgeland and remnants of shale-associated forest communities. A separately reserved parcel within the wider Little Forest conservation landscape is the Gandangara State Conservation Area, a 6.9-hectare (17-acre) reserve managed by the NSW National Parks and Wildlife Service (NPWS).

The area is notable for its position at the transition between Hawkesbury Sandstone and shale-influenced landscapes and supports threatened ecological communities and species. It also contains Aboriginal cultural sites, including grinding grooves, artefact scatters and rock art. It lies within the area of the Gandangara Local Aboriginal Land Council.

== History ==
The land that became the Lucas Heights Conservation Area was formerly owned by Waste Service NSW and had originally been intended as a northern extension of the Lucas Heights waste management facility. During the 1990s, the future management of the land was considered as part of environmental mediation involving Sutherland Shire Council and Waste Service NSW. A 1996 report by the Office of Environmental Mediation and Inquiry established management responsibilities for several parcels of land in the Lucas Heights area. As part of the resulting arrangements, approximately 111.7 hectares (276 acres) of land was transferred to Sutherland Shire Council in April 2002 for conservation purposes.

An archaeological survey of the conservation area was completed in 1997 and identified several sites of Aboriginal significance. The council's plan of management called for further cultural surveys in consultation with the Gandangara Local Aboriginal Land Council and for the location of walking tracks and visitor infrastructure to take Aboriginal cultural heritage into account. The conservation area has been recorded on the New South Wales Aboriginal Heritage Information Management System.

Sutherland Shire Council adopted the Plan of Management for Natural Areas – Lucas Heights Conservation Area on 20 May 2002. The plan was based on an earlier environmental management plan prepared by National Environmental Consulting Services on behalf of Waste Services NSW and the council. Its objectives included reversing environmental degradation, rehabilitating disturbed land and changing the area's use from uncontrolled four-wheel-drive and trail-bike recreation to conservation and low-impact public use. A smaller area of approximately 6 hectares (15 acres) of stringybark–ironbark open forest was identified for transfer to the National Parks and Wildlife Service. The Gandangara State Conservation Area was formally reserved on 4 March 2011 and covers approximately 6.9 hectares (17 acres). No Aboriginal sites had been formally recorded within the small Gandangara State Conservation Area itself as of 2014, although numerous sites occur in the surrounding landscape, including grinding grooves, artefacts, stone arrangements, rock art and shelters.

== Geography ==
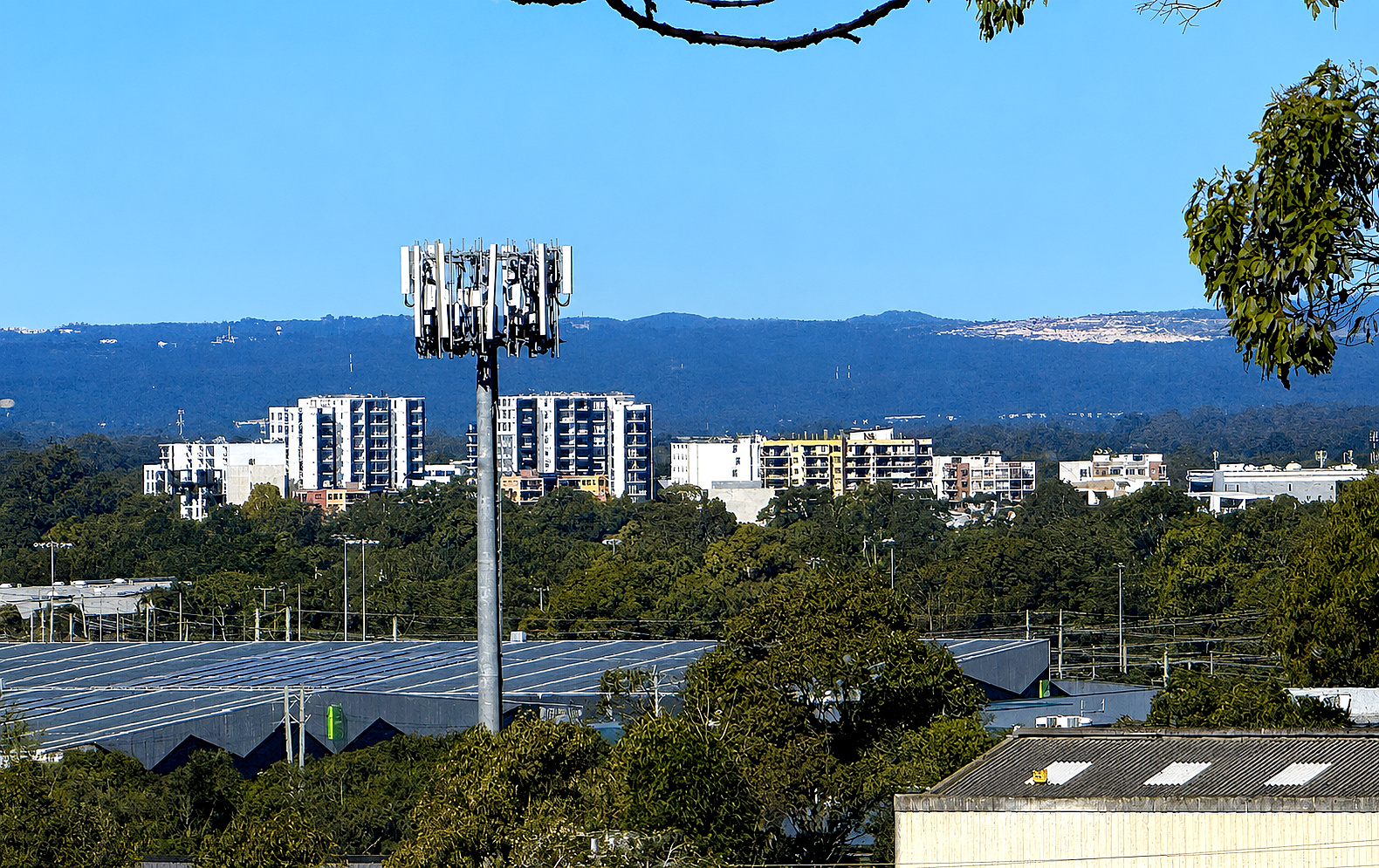
The hilly, forested conservation area viewed from Greystanes, with Fairfield CBD in the foreground

The Lucas Heights Conservation Area is situated on the south-western boundary of the Sutherland Shire, approximately 30 kilometres (19 mi) south-west of the Sydney central business district. It is bounded generally by Heathcote Road and the Holsworthy Barracks to the west, and bushland, Little Forest Road and former waste disposal sites to the east. The area occupies part of the Mill Creek catchment. Mill Creek originates in the vicinity of the Lucas Heights Resource Recovery Park and flows north through the conservation area before ultimately draining into the Georges River. Several smaller tributaries originate within the reserve.

The landscape is characterised by sandstone plateaus, slopes and drainage lines. Rock platforms and sandstone escarpments occur throughout the area. Differences in geology, topography, aspect and soil depth have resulted in a complex mosaic of vegetation communities. The Gandangara State Conservation Area is located near the headwaters of Mill Creek at Menai, approximately 0.5 kilometres (0.31 mi) east of Heathcote Road, in an area locally known as Little Forest. It lies within the Sydney Basin bioregion. The Lucas Heights Resource Recovery Park is situated within the broader conservation area and is largely surrounded by protected bushland.

=== Flora ===
The Lucas Heights Conservation Area predominantly supports native vegetation adapted to the shallow, nutrient-poor sandstone soils of the region, although shale-derived soils occur in parts of the reserve. Five broad vegetation communities were identified in the 2002 plan of management:

- Sydney Turpentine–Ironbark Forest;
- smooth-barked apple woodland;
- scribbly gum–red bloodwood woodland;
- mallee and heathland; and
- wet heath and sedgeland.

Sydney Turpentine–Ironbark Forest occurs on shale soils in the north-eastern part of the conservation area. The Mill Creek Catchment Strategic Management Plan also identified areas of Shale/Sandstone Transition Forest and described the conservation area as containing significant vegetation and habitat values. The Little Forest area is considered an important remnant of shale-associated forest and demonstrates the transition between vegetation growing on shale and vegetation of sandstone geology. The Gandangara State Conservation Area contains Shale Sandstone Transition Forest, a threatened ecological community listed under New South Wales and Commonwealth environmental legislation. The wider Lucas Heights Conservation Area is also significant for populations of Allocasuarina diminuta subsp. mimica, a dwarf she-oak. The Mill Creek catchment plan described the reserve as containing the species' main Australian stronghold. The threatened shrub Melaleuca deanei has also been recorded within the conservation area.

=== Fauna ===
The conservation area supports fauna characteristic of sandstone woodland and heath environments. Threatened species recorded in the Lucas Heights Conservation Area at the time of the 2002 plan included the red-crowned toadlet (Pseudophryne australis), powerful owl (Ninox strenua) and sooty owl (Tyto tenebricosa). Five threatened animal species had been recorded in the vicinity of Gandangara State Conservation Area and were considered capable of occurring within the reserve: the red-crowned toadlet, Rosenberg's monitor (Varanus rosenbergi), powerful owl, koala (Phascolarctos cinereus) and grey-headed flying fox (Pteropus poliocephalus).

At least 14 species of honeyeater have been recorded in Gandangara State Conservation Area, including the regionally significant tawny-crowned honeyeater (Gliciphila melanops). Other woodland birds recorded in the reserve include the dusky woodswallow (Artamus cyanopterus), weebill (Smicrornis brevirostris) and double-barred finch (Taeniopygia bichenovii).

== Management ==
The majority of the Lucas Heights Conservation Area is managed by Sutherland Shire Council as community land categorised as a natural area under the Local Government Act 1993. Management objectives focus on biodiversity conservation, rehabilitation of degraded areas, protection of Aboriginal cultural heritage and low-impact community access. Permitted uses identified in the council's plan of management include bushwalking, environmental education and scientific research on designated walking tracks, as well as access for firefighting and land-management purposes. The plan also provides for Aboriginal community access to identified archaeological sites.

Trail bikes and unauthorised four-wheel-drive vehicles are prohibited. Management measures have included fencing, barriers, signs, rehabilitation of vehicle tracks and cooperation between council, police and the National Parks and Wildlife Service. Gandangara State Conservation Area is separately managed by the NSW National Parks and Wildlife Service under the National Parks and Wildlife Act 1974. The reserve has no public road access. Management priorities include protection of Shale/Sandstone Transition Forest, fire management, pest and weed control, erosion mitigation and reducing illegal off-road vehicle use.

=== Conservation and rehabilitation ===
Before its formal management as a conservation area, the Lucas Heights site was used without authorisation for trail-bike riding and four-wheel driving. Parts of the reserve were also affected by vegetation clearing and rubbish dumping. The extensive network of informal vehicle tracks contributed to erosion, damage to vegetation and fauna habitat, and deterioration of water quality in Mill Creek. Disturbed areas also provided opportunities for weed invasion and changes to soil nutrient conditions. The 2010 Mill Creek catchment plan continued to identify unauthorised vehicle access as a significant management issue. A former clay quarry, known as Bourke's Quarry, is located within the conservation area. The quarry was filled and progressively rehabilitated and revegetated with locally native species. Conservation works in the reserve have included weed control, bush regeneration, vehicle-track closures, fencing, walking-track works and tree planting.

In 2025, a revegetation project included the planting of 2,000 koala habitat trees in a degraded former clay quarry area of the Lucas Heights Conservation Area known as "the Paddock". The site borders a remnant of Cumberland Shale–Sandstone Ironbark Forest. Within Gandangara State Conservation Area, introduced animals recorded or known from the vicinity include red foxes, feral cats and feral deer. Weeds include crofton weed and exotic grasses. Illegal off-road driving has also damaged tracks and trails within the reserve.

== See also ==
- Protected areas of New South Wales
- Heathcote National Park
