= David Ipp =

Australian judge (1938–2020)

David Andrew Ipp AO QC (1938 – 8 October 2020) was a South African-born Australian lawyer, judge and Commissioner of the NSW Independent Commission Against Corruption between 2009 and 2014.

Ipp was a judge of the Court of Appeal of the Supreme Court of New South Wales.

== Education ==
Ipp was born in Johannesburg, where he attended Parktown Boys' High School. He subsequently graduated with a Bachelor of Commerce and Bachelor of Laws from the University of Stellenbosch.

== Career ==
In 1964, Ipp became a partner at Hayman Godfrey & Sanderson Attorneys in Johannesburg. He was admitted to the South African bar in 1973.

Ipp moved to Australia in 1981 and was admitted as a barrister in Western Australia. He was appointed Queen's Counsel in 1985.

Ipp served as Treasurer of the Law Society of Western Australia in 1988. He was a Fellow at the University of Western Australia in 1999–2000, and was awarded an Inns of Court Fellowship at the University of London's Institute of Advanced Legal Studies in 1996–97.

In 1994, Ipp was a Fulbright Senior Scholar. He was scholar in residence at the University of Virginia School of Law.

From 1989 to 2002, Ipp served as a judge of the Supreme Court of Western Australia. From 1993 to 2001, Ipp was also the Judge in Charge of the Civil List. From 2001 to 2002 he was Acting Judge of Appeal of the NSW Court of Appeal before being appointed a Judge of Appeal in 2002.

In 2008, Ipp was a visiting fellow at the Wolfson College, Cambridge.

Ipp also served as a judge on the Supreme Court of Fiji.

Ipp was a member of the Court of Arbitration for Sport and had been since 2000.

=== Tort law reform ===
Ipp was the Chairman of the Panel of Eminent Persons, which former Australian Prime Minister John Howard established in 2002 to reform tort laws. The Panel produced its final report known as the Ipp Report on 30 September 2002. Many of the recommendations in the report were taken up by state Parliaments in enacting new personal injury legislation.

In 2007, Ipp criticised the reforms which were introduced as a result of his recommendations, suggesting many of the reforms had gone too far.

=== Independent Commission Against Corruption ===
In November 2009, Ipp was appointed as the Commissioner of the NSW Independent Commission Against Corruption (ICAC), replacing Jerrold Cripps QC whose fixed term had expired. Ipp's fixed term as Commissioner was due to expire in November 2014; however in October 2013 he announced his retirement with effect from late January 2014, citing ill health.

== Death ==
Ipp died in Sydney on 8 October 2020, aged 82.
