= Coleman v Power =

Legal case in the High Court of Australia

- Court: High Court of Australia
- Full case name: Coleman v Power, Carnes and Attorney-General (Queensland)
- Decided: 1 September 2004
- Citations: [2004] HCA 39, 220 CLR 1

Case history
- Prior actions: [2001] QCA 539, [2002] 2 Qd R 620

Court membership
- Judges sitting: Gleeson CJ, McHugh, Gummow, Kirby, Hayne, Callinan and Heydon JJ

Case opinions
- (4:3) The conviction for using insulting words should be set aside, and the appeal allowed. (per McHugh, Gummow, Kirby and Hayne JJ)

Coleman v Power was a High Court of Australia case that dealt with the implied freedom of political communication found in the Australian Constitution.

== Background ==
Coleman was a law and politics student from Townsville. He started handing out flyers in a shopping centre alleging police corruption in the Queensland police force. He was asked to stop by Power, a police officer, but refused. Coleman was subsequently arrested for insulting language, but violently resisted arrest. He was charged with using "insulting words" under the Vagrancy Act as well as assaulting and obstructing a police officer.

Coleman argued he was not guilty of using insulting words because they were political communication and thus protected under the implied freedom of political communication. A magistrate found him guilty, but he then appealed. All subsequent appeals failed to some extent. He then appealed to the High Court.

== Decision ==
The court held that his conviction under s7(1)(d) of the Vagrancy Act should be set aside but that the conviction for assaulting/obstructing a police officer should stand.

Gummow, Hayne JJ and Kirby J held the impugned section of the VA to be valid, concluded that it would infringe the second limb of the Lange v Australian Broadcasting Corporation test, to the extent that it applied to political communication and read it down so that it did not. What Coleman said was not insulting as intended to be outlawed by the Act, they reasoned. They accepted that communications alleging corruption of police were protected by the implied right to freedom of political communication. They also accepted that political communication could include insults. Further, Kirby J noted that insulting words were a well-known tradition in Australian politics from "its earliest history".

McHugh J also held that the impugned section infringed the second limb of the Lange v ABC test to the extent that it applied to political communication. Rather than read the section down, he declared it invalid altogether.

This meant that a 4-judge majority had ruled his conviction under the VA should be overturned. As the Act had been found valid by all except McHugh J, Coleman's convictions for assaulting/obstructing a police officer were not overturned.

== Significance ==
The case is significant as an iterative step in the High Court's development of Australia's freedom of political communication doctrine. The case is also significant as having confirmed the applicability of the constitutional freedom doctrine to state legislation.
