= Cleanaway =

Australian waste management company

- Type: Public company
- Traded as: ASX: CWY
- Industry: Waste management
- Founded: 1979
- Founder: Brambles
- Headquarters: Melbourne, Australia
- Key people: Mark Schubert (Chairman)
- Number of employees: 7,900 (2025)
- Website: www.cleanaway.com.au

Cleanaway Waste Management Limited is an Australian waste management company. Founded in 1979 by Brambles, it has extensive operations in Australia. As at June 2021, it employed over 6,300 people and operated 5,300 trucks from more than 250 branches, as well as a range of static facilities. It is the largest waste management business in Australia.

== History ==
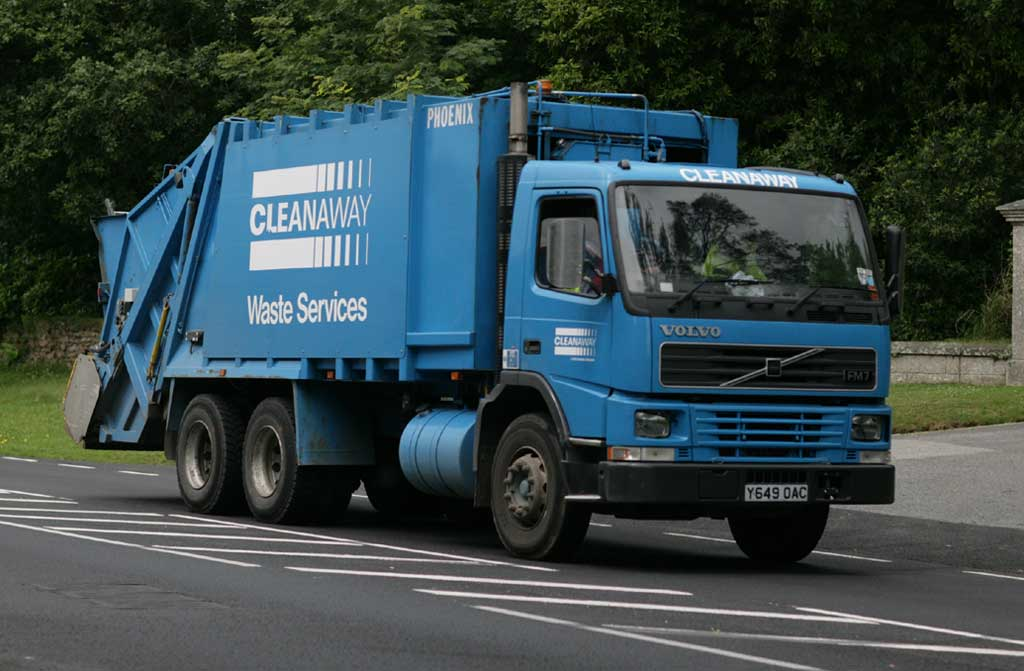
A Cleanaway Volvo FM municipal solid waste collection truck in the United Kingdom in January 2009

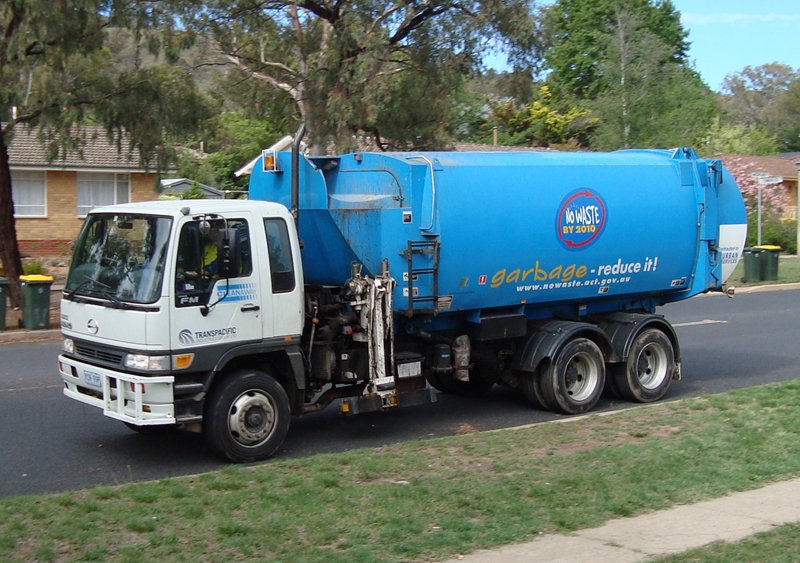
A Cleanaway Hino garbage truck in Canberra in January 2008

Brambles entered the waste management and disposal industry in 1970 when it purchased the Australian waste collection and disposal services of the Purle Group. In 1979, it began trading as Cleanaway.

Cleanaway expanded into Europe in the 1990s, purchasing businesses in the Netherlands, Germany and the United Kingdom. By 2003 the UK operation employed over 8,000 people. The German business was sold in 2005. Veolia acquired Cleanaway UK in 2006.

In June 2006, Brambles sold Cleanaway to KKR, who then sold it to Transpacific Industries in May 2007. Transpacific Industries was formed in 1987, expanding through organic and strategic growth. The combined entity would continue to trade separately as Transpacific Industries and Cleanaway for ten years. In September 2013 the Commercial Vehicles Group that sold Dennis Eagle, MAN and Western Star Trucks was sold to the Penske Automotive Group.

In late 2015 the company rebranded to Cleanaway Waste Management, dropping the Transpacific name. In May 2018, Cleanaway acquired Tox Free Solutions, including its subsidiary Daniels Health.

In 2019, Cleanaway acquired a number of the SKM Recycling Group's assets for $66 million, restoring and reopening the facilities completely by February 2020. The acquisition included two materials recovery facilities and two transfer stations in Victoria, and a material recovery facility in Tasmania. The site in Laverton North includes a plastic sorting facility which separates plastics from material recovery facilities into clean, individual polymer grades for sale or input into a pelletising facility. SKM was in substantial debt after the Victorian Environment Protection Authority placed limitations on its waste intake in response to a series of fires involving recycling stockpiles, leading to SKM ceasing waste collections from more than 30 councils with recycling diverted to landfill. The acquisition of Statewide Recycling in late 2019 expanded Cleanaway's regional Victoria business, including a transfer station in Warrnambool.

In April 2021, Cleanaway agreed terms to purchase the Sydney operations of Suez Environnement, after Suez and Veolia reached a merger agreement. As part of its acquisition of SUEZ Australia's waste and recycling business in 2021, Cleanaway acquired the Lucas Heights Resource Recovery Park in Sydney, one of the largest waste management facilities in New South Wales. The Elizabeth Drive Landfill, which accepts only non-putrescible waste, was also acquired by Cleanaway in 2021 as part of the company's acquisition of Suez's Sydney waste and recycling assets.

Cleanaway shareholders delivered a "first strike" against the company at its annual general meeting on October 21, 2025, following a series of fatal incidents at its worksites. If it receives another strike at its 2026 annual general meeting, it must hold a vote asking investors whether they want to spill the board.

== Incidents ==
On 15 May 2000 an accident at Cleanaway UK's Ellesmere Port toxic waste incinerator killed an employee and seriously injured another. The plant had been shut down to allow replacement of steel structures, and the men were on a scaffolding platform when over a tonne of concrete fell on them. Following a Crown Court trial Cleanaway was convicted of health and safety failings, and fined £200,000 plus £135,000 in costs.

Cleanaway's UK subsidiary was the first company ordered to pay compensation to a worker under the Employment Equality (Sexual Orientation) Regulations 2003, after a gay manager quit following persistent harassment from his seniors because of his sexuality. The case received widespread media attention, with the victim commenting that prior to the case he had tried to keep his sexuality a private matter. The Guardian described it as a landmark judgement, while a Stonewall spokesperson said the ruling showed such abuse "was no longer going to be tolerated" and compared the remarks directed at the victim to "jokes about 'Pakis'" from previous decades.

In April 2017 Cleanaway was issued a fine of $650,000 for a fire at a chemical waste processing facility in which a worker was seriously burned. The sentencing judge accused Cleanaway of initiating a trial process despite giving workers limited information about the trial and the new chemical involved. This was the largest fine ever handed out at a Comcare-initiated prosecution.

In August 2014, a Cleanaway sewage tanker truck collided with many cars at the lower part of the South Eastern Freeway, killing two people. Following the accident the company pulled 2,800 trucks from service for inspections, disrupting waste collections for days. The sewage truck ran away after the driver, a new employee who had never driven a manual truck before and had never driven any vehicle on this segment of road, lost control after passing the arrestor beds. Driver Darren Hicks was seriously injured and testified against Cleanaway at a criminal trial after being granted immunity. The prosecution, brought by Comcare, also heard that the brakes on the vehicle were defective and in 2021 Cleanaway were convicted of eight charges under health and safety legislation. In May 2026, Cleanaway was convicted and fined $1.1m over the incident.

In May 2020 vivasol leaked from a Cleanaway facility in Queanbeyan and entered the Molonglo River, with a further discharge occurring the following month. The New South Wales Environment Protection Authority in March 2021 charged Cleanaway with two water pollution offences and with allegedly taking five hours to notify them of the first incident. As a result of the leak the EPA mobilised 50 inspectors to simultaneously perform unannounced inspections of 27 Cleanaway locations. Three were fined a total of $31,500 for inadequate recordkeeping and waste storage, including two that had previously received fines for improper waste storage. The EPA also described finding "consistent areas of concern" and criticised Cleanaway's "management of its operations" following the inspections.

In September 2024, a contractor visited Cleanaway's Lucas Heights Resource and Recovery Park in Sydney to offload waste, when he sustained fatal crush injuries from a compactor being operated by another worker at the site. In October 2026, Cleanaway were charged with breaching federal work safety laws, and face a potential maximum fine of $2.32m.

Cleanaway's safety record continued to be noticed with nine deaths on worksites in Australia in 2½ years between mid-2022 and December 2025.

== Products and services ==
In addition to general waste disposal, recycling, healthcare and clinical waste collections and disposal etc. Cleanaway also manages several landfills, waste transfer stations and material recovery facilities throughout Australia, turning some received waste into energy and other materials.

In April 2021, Cleanaway launched Greenius, a free online learning resource for residents.

== Joint ventures ==
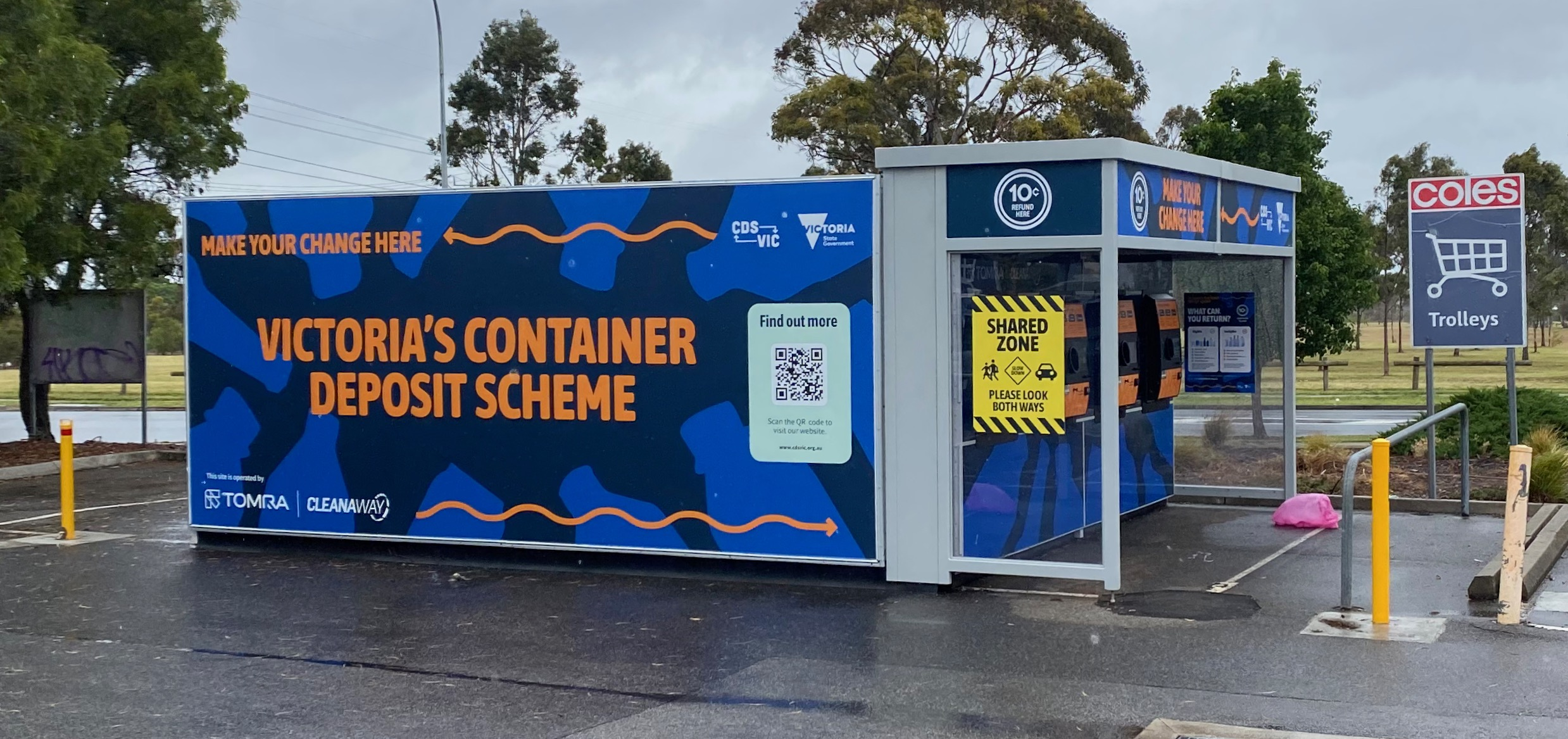
A reverse vending machine in western Melbourne operated by Cleanaway and Tomra

In 2007, Cleanaway formed a joint venture with Veolia and purchased EarthPower, an organic food waste processing facility. The facility uses anaerobic digestion technology to convert food waste into combustible gas similar to natural gas to produce green electricity.

The Tomra Cleanaway partnership was appointed to be the Network Operator for the New South Wales container deposit scheme (also known as Return and Earn). Tomra provides the reverse vending machines, and Cleanaway collects and processes the containers from the machines and collection points around New South Wales. As of 25 February 2021, five billion containers have been returned since the start of the scheme. This same partnership was also chosen as the network operator for western Victoria and western Melbourne for Victoria's container deposit scheme in April 2023.

On 19 February 2020, Asahi Breweries, Cleanaway and Pact Group Holdings announced a joint venture to develop a plastic pelletising facility. This facility is expected to process up to 28,000 tonnes of plastic bottles and other plastic packaging. The facility will trade as Circular Plastics Australia (PET).
