= Theophanous v Herald & Weekly Times Ltd =

Judgment of the High Court of Australia

- Court: High Court of Australia
- Decided: 12 October 1994
- Citations: [1994] HCA 46, (1994) 182 CLR 104

Court membership
- Judges sitting: Mason CJ, Brennan, Deane, Dawson, Toohey, Gaudron, McHugh JJ

Theophanous v Herald & Weekly Times Ltd is a landmark Australian judgment of the High Court. The matter related to implied freedom of political communication that the High Court has inferred, rests in the Australian constitution.

== Background ==
Andrew Theophanous had been an Australian Labor Party member of the Australian House of Representatives since 1980. In 1992, he was the chairperson of the Joint Parliamentary Standing Committee on Migration. The Herald and Weekly Times published an article by Bruce Ruxton, "Give Theophanous the shove", which stated that Theophanous "appears to want a bias shown towards Greeks as migrants". Theophanous sued the Herald & Weekly Times and Ruxton for defamation.

== Decision ==
The judgment held that there was an implied constitutional freedom to publish material discussing government and political matters as well as the way that members of the Parliament of Australia conducted their duties and their suitability for office.

== Significance ==
Just three years later, with a change in the composition of the High Court, the court unanimously reversed the opinion in Lange v Australian Broadcasting Corporation. It held that no direct right to free speech could form a defence to defamation. Still, the case remains important in the development of the implied freedom.
