= Public Service Act 1999 =

Parliament of Australia
- Commenced: 5 December 1999
- Introduced by: Howard government
- Status: In force

The Public Service Act 1999 (Public Service Act, 1999 (Cth)) is an Australian law, passed in 1999 by the Howard government that regulates the federal Australian Public Service.

The Act regulates the employment of federal public servants in Australia.

The Act establishes obligations of the Australian Government toward its public servants, and establishes the code of conduct to which they must adhere, including a requirement that they act apolitically, and not disseminate or exploit government information without authorization. It also establishes requirements that public servants be hired on merit.

Prior to the public service act, other statutes were in force to ensure that public service selection would be on merit. Such statutes arose historically as an effort to eliminate the spoils system from democratic politics.

The Act also established the office of the Australian Public Service Commissioner and the Merit Protection Commissioner as well as the Australian Public Service Commission.

== History ==
In November 1996, Peter Reith issued a discussion paper, Towards a best practice Australian Public Service, that, among other things, recommended key elements which might need to be incorporated into a new streamlined and principles-based Public Service Act.

After several years spent developing a new Act, the Public Service Act 1999 came into effect on 5 December 1999.

== Code of conduct ==
The Act also introduced APS Values and a Code of Conduct for the first time, under which public servants who breach the code of conduct can be demoted, fined, reprimanded or fired.

The constitutionality of the code of conduct of the Act was challenged in 2019 in the High Court case Comcare v Banerji, which ruled unanimously that the code was compatible with Australia's freedom of political communication doctrine.

== See also ==
- Comcare v Banerji
