= Lange v Atkinson =

- Court: Judicial Committee of the Privy Council
- Full case name: D.R. Lange Appellant v (1) J.B. Atkinson and (2) Australian Consolidated Press NZ Limited Respondents
- Citations: [1997] 2 NZLR 22 (HC), [1998] 3 NZLR 424 (CA), [2000] 1 NZLR 257 (PC), [2000] 3 NZLR 385
- Transcript: Privy Council judgment Court of Appeal judgment (2000)

Court membership
- Judges sitting: Lord Nicholls of Birkenhead, Lord Steyn, Lord Cooke of Thorndon, Lord Hope of Craighead, Lord Hobhouse of Woodborough

Keywords
- defamation

Lange v Atkinson [1997] 2 NZLR 22 (HC), [1998] 3 NZLR 424 (CA), [2000] 1 NZLR 257 (PC), [2000] 3 NZLR 385 is a cited case in New Zealand regarding defamation claims in tort.

== Background ==
Joe Atkinson, a political columnist, wrote an article critical of former prime minister David Lange and the 4th Labour Government which was published in the October 1995 issue of North & South magazine.

Lange found the article defamatory, and sued Atkinson, and the magazine's publisher ACP for defamation, upon which they filed a defence of qualified privilege.

Lange spent the next 4 years trying to get their defence struck out.

The Court of Appeal's final hearing in Lange v Atkinson (No. 2) remains the leading case on the law of qualified privilege in New Zealand and affirmed that qualified privilege extends to publications concerning the conduct of publicly elected officeholders and those seeking such office.

== See also ==
Besides featuring in NZ case law for defamation, David Lange also featured in Australian defamation case law in Lange v Australian Broadcasting Corporation (1997) 189 CLR 520; 145 ALR 96 (HCA).
