= Lucas Heights Resource Recovery Park =

Waste management and landfill facility in Sydney, Australia

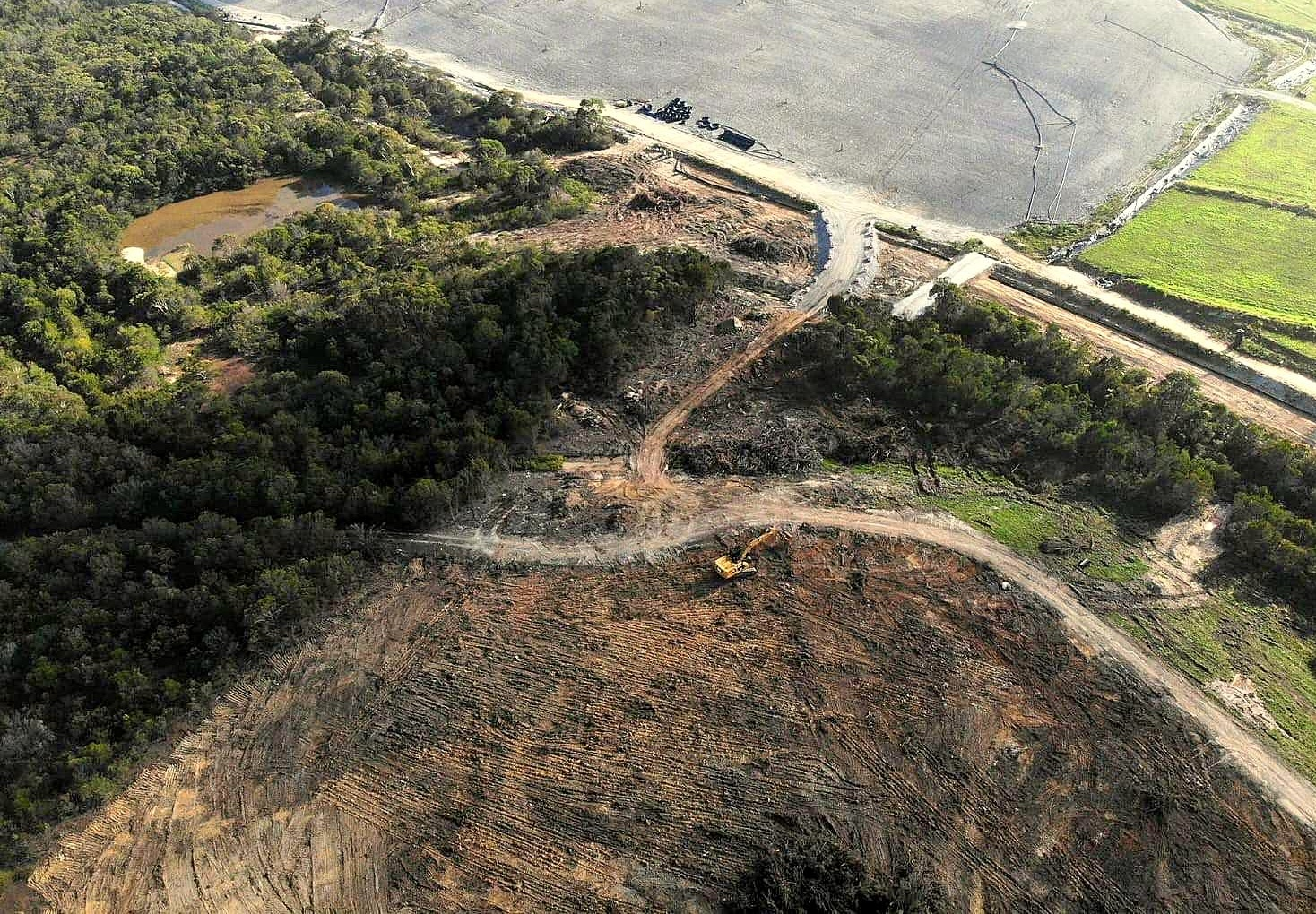
- Bird's eye view of the site
- Country: Australia
- Location: Lucas Heights, New South Wales
- Coordinates: 33.98867°S 150.99699°E
- Status: Operational
- Commission date: 1987
- Owner: Cleanaway
- Operator: Cleanaway

External links
- Website: www.cleanaway.com.au/location/lucas-heights-rrp

The Lucas Heights Resource Recovery Park (LHRRP) is one of the largest waste management and resource recovery facilities in the Sydney metropolitan area, located in Lucas Heights, New South Wales, Australia. Also known as Lucas Heights Landfill, the facility operates as a waste disposal and resource recovery centre, providing public drop-off services for a range of recyclable materials, including paper and cardboard, steel and scrap metal, used oil, and vehicle batteries.

The site also incorporates the Lucas Heights Organic Resource Recovery Facility, which receives and processes organic waste for conversion into compost and other recycled organic products. The facility is licensed to receive up to 550,000 tonnes of putrescible and non-putrescible solid waste annually. Owned and operated by Cleanaway, the facility accepts household waste, construction and demolition waste, commercial waste and industrial waste. As Sydney's only remaining putrescible landfill, the facility receives household, commercial and industrial waste from numerous local councils, including Fairfield, Liverpool and Blacktown City Councils, all of which use Cleanaway as their waste collection contractor.

== History ==
The site formerly contained two principal landfill areas: one operated by Sutherland Shire Council from 1965 to 1976, and a second operated by the Metropolitan Waste Disposal Authority (later Waste Service NSW) from 1976 until 1987. In 1985, Waste Service NSW received approval to fill up the gorge with both putrescible and non-putrescible waste in order to create a revised landform profile. The 1985 approval permitted filling to a maximum elevation of 162 metres (531 ft) AHD. The facility was established in 1987 following the closure of the former Lucas Heights landfill. By the mid-1990s, the southern area of the facility had reached this level, with landfill operations progressively advancing northwards across the remainder of the site. By June 1996, the remaining approved landfill capacity was estimated at 9.12 million tonnes. By 1998, more than 75 per cent of the site had been disturbed by waste-disposal activities, cover-material extraction, site infrastructure and road construction. By that time, approximately 30 hectares (74 acres) of previously disturbed land had undergone partial rehabilitation through the establishment of cover crops, mulching and the planting of native trees. An area to the west of the dumpsite was purged and used as a borrow area to supply soil and other cover materials for landfill operations.

Site investigations undertaken in 1995 confirmed that the landfill contained both putrescible and non-putrescible waste, with waste deposits reaching depths of up to 6 metres (19.7 ft). From 1998, Waste Service NSW held a permissive occupancy arrangement over much of the area, along with the borrow zone, with the former Department of Land and Water Conservation. As part of this arrangement, Waste Service NSW was responsible for rehabilitating the area in accordance with regulatory requirements, including the ongoing operation and maintenance of landfill leachate and landfill gas collection and management systems. Waste Service NSW subsequently contracted Energy Developments to gather landfill gas from much of the site. The recovered gas was used to generate electricity, which was supplied to the local power grid. The agreement with EDL was expected to continue until approximately 2025, or before marketable gas extraction was no longer economically viable.

== Geography ==
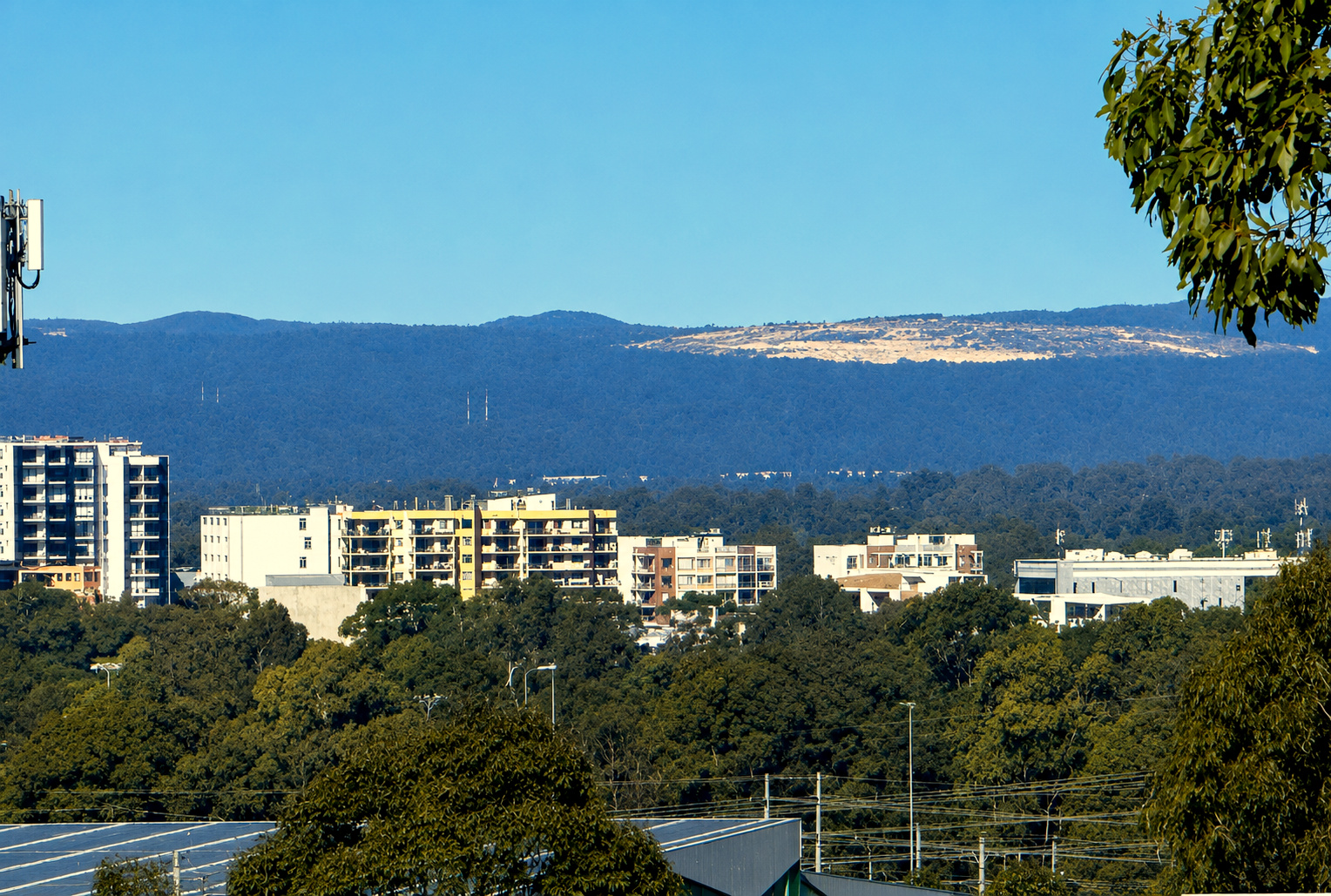
View from the north, showing the park as a yellow patch in the far distance, with the Fairfield CBD skyline in the centre of the image.

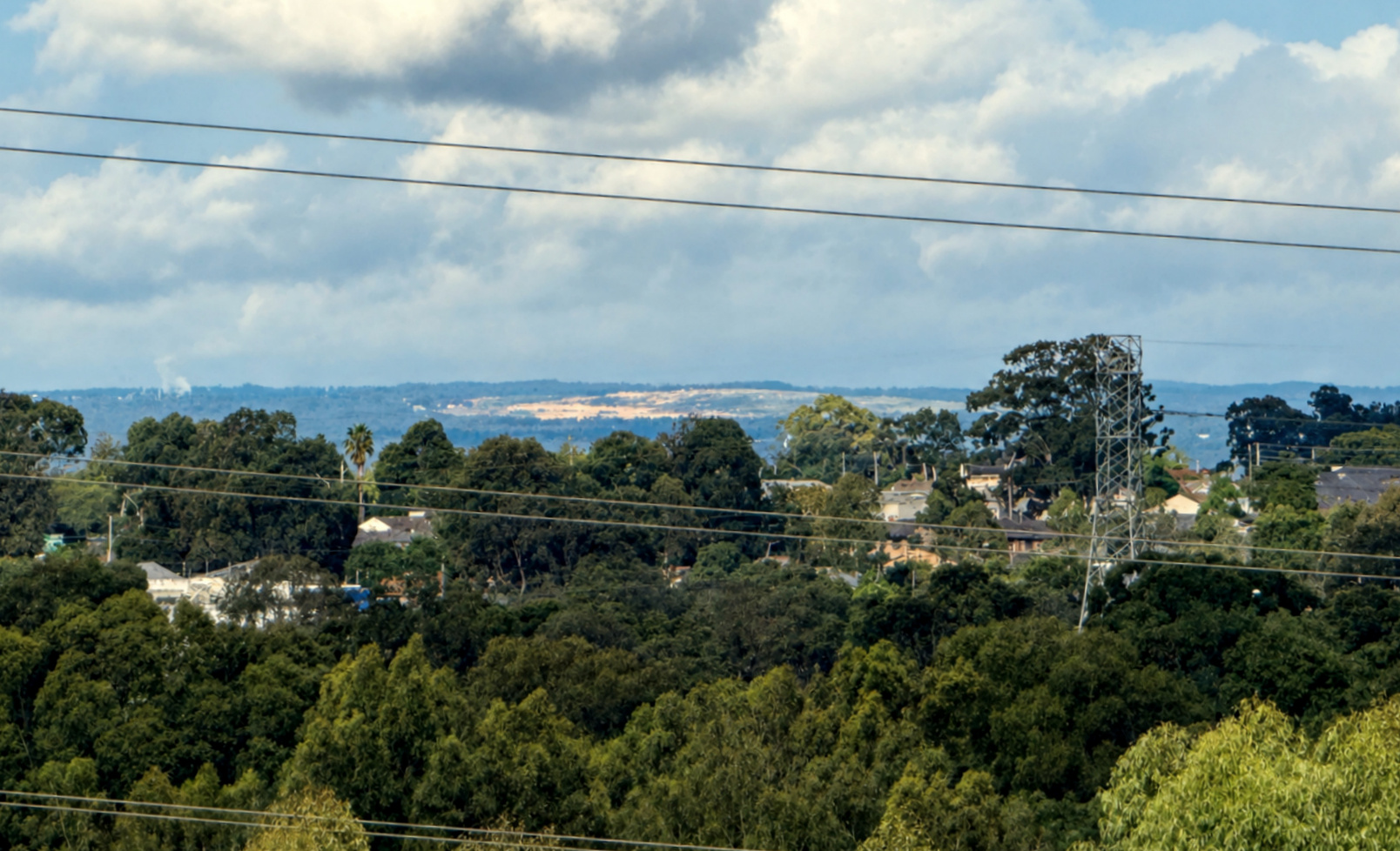
The landfill viewed from Pemulwuy, with Smithfield in the centre of the image

The site is one of the largest waste management facilities in the Sydney region, alongside facilities such as the Eastern Creek landfill and the Woodlawn Eco Precinct. Viewed from above, the facility occupies an irregularly shaped area measuring nearly 2 kilometres (1.2 mi) in length and approximately 1 kilometre (0.6 mi) in width. Ranging in elevation from 115 to 180 metres (377 to 591 ft) above sea level, it occupies a modified ridgeline between two creek systems and covers approximately 110 hectares (272 acres). The landfill consists of a large engineered waste mound covered with soil and rock, with a network of landfill-gas extraction pipes extending across its surface. Beneath the mound are tens of millions of tonnes of compacted waste, forming a landfill cell approximately 25 metres high and about one kilometre in length. Active landfill operations are conducted beyond the crest of the mound, where waste is deposited, compacted and covered by heavy machinery. Active landfill operations are concentrated in the central portion of the site. Areas at the southern end have been capped and are undergoing rehabilitation, while a large excavation near the northern boundary has been prepared for future landfill development.

The facility is situated within the broader Lucas Heights Conservation Area and is largely surrounded by protected bushland. Accessed via New Illawarra Road, the park is situated on Little Forest Road in Lucas Heights, approximately 30 kilometres south-west of the Sydney central business district, within the Sutherland Shire local government area, and is bounded by Heathcote Road to the west and south. The facility occupies approximately 205 hectares, including land owned by Cleanaway and leased land within the 1.6-kilometre exclusion zone surrounding the Australian Nuclear Science and Technology Organisation (ANSTO) complex. To the north-east of the site were a quarry undergoing rehabilitation, the former Harrington's Quarry landfill, a liquid-waste warehouse, a low-level radioactive waste disposal facility, and the former Sutherland Shire Council night-soil depot.

Mill Creek, a tributary of the Georges River, forms on the western side of the facility and flows north through the conservation area. Most of the park is situated inside the Mill Creek catchment. The creek originates within the site and flows north along its western boundary before joining the Georges River. To minimise impacts on water quality, Cleanaway manages surface water by diverting uncontaminated runoff away from active landfill and disturbed areas, while directing stormwater runoff to sedimentation dams for treatment. Areas toward the west and south of the facility are bordered by the Holsworthy Barracks and Heathcote National Park. The nearest residential areas include the ANSTO accommodation facility approximately 300 metres east of the site, as well as the areas of Barden Ridge, Engadine and Menai.

=== Ecology ===
The site meets the Lucas Heights Conservation Area and is bordered by bushland owned by ANSTO. Land surrounding the former Waste Management Centre was largely undeveloped and retained extensive areas of native woodland by the 1990s. The southern part of the site is predominantly grassed, while the northern and western sections are characterised by more sparsely vegetated and disturbed landforms associated with former landfill and borrow-area activities. Vegetation in the southern part of the site is dominated by introduced kikuyu grass grassland, with remnant woodland occurring around the perimeter. Elsewhere, vegetation is sparse and consists mainly of scattered trees and shrubs, interspersed with extensive unvegetated rocky areas associated with the borrow zones.

The site is bordered to the north, west and south by largely undisturbed native open woodland. These woodland communities typically range from 39 to 52 feet (12 to 16 metres) in height and have a canopy cover of approximately 30 to 70 per cent. With the exception of areas proposed for dam construction, development activities were intended to minimise impacts on the surrounding native vegetation. The landfill attracts large numbers of birds, including Australian ravens, ibises, Pacific gulls and the Australian pelicans, which congregate around active waste disposal areas. The site experiences a warm, dry and exposed microclimate, resulting in high rates of evapotranspiration. Average annual rainfall is approximately 1,016 mm (40 inches).

=== Geology ===
The geology of the area is characteristic of the coastal tableland of the Sydney Basin, comprising Hawkesbury sandstone interstratified with shale layers. The landscape is characterised by undulating ridges and plateau surfaces separated by steep-sided valleys. Soils in adjacent undisturbed areas are typically moderately deep, ranging from approximately 0.5 to 1.5 metres (1.6 to 4.9 feet), and consist of lateritic podzols with a bleached, stony sandy clay loam profile. These soils are highly erodible and readily transported by surface runoff.The site's landform comprises several distinct geomorphological zones, including an irregularly sloping southern sector, a broad plane depression proximate to New Illawarra Road, extensive ridgelines and embankments created through landfill operations, and large sloping borrow areas located along the northern and western margins of the site.

The landfill is capped with a stratum of shattered sandstone overlying the putrefiable waste. Soil conditions throughout the site vary considerably, with cover depths ranging from approximately 100 millimetres (3.9 in) to more than 1,000 millimetres (39.4 in). Much of the cover material was sourced from extensive borrow areas located to the north and west of the site. These soils consist primarily of acidic, compacted sandy clay with low levels of nutrients and organic matter. There is little to no topsoil covering the borrow areas, which are characterised by exposed and weathered sandstone surfaces. Across the southern landfill area, the depth of cover material varies from approximately 300 millimetres (11.8 in) to 1,500 millimetres (59.1 in).

== Facilities and operations ==
The facility includes:

- A designed landfill permitting common solid (both decayable and non-decayable) waste and asbestos garbage.
- A green waste processing facility receiving garden organics and timber waste.
- A public drop-off centre for recyclable materials, including paper, pasteboard, steel and aluminium cans, electronic waste, scrap metal, used oil, paint, whitegoods and vehicle batteries.
- A transfer station for small vehicles carrying miscellaneous stacks of comprehensive solid waste.

Waste is transported to the site by truck and deposited in active landfill areas. The facility receives approximately 3,000 tonnes of waste per day, equivalent to nearly one million tonnes annually. The landfill is engineered with a high-density polyethylene liner and clay barrier designed to prevent leachate from contaminating surrounding groundwater and waterways. Captured landfill gas is used to generate electricity, with the site's landfill-gas power station reportedly producing enough energy to supply approximately 25,000 homes. The park also hosts a minibike facility operated by the Police Citizens Youth Clubs NSW on a rehabilitated landfill area, while the Sydney International Clay Target Association leases land on the western boundary for clay target shooting. A former landfill area to the north-east of the site, known as LH1, has been redeveloped for recreational use.

=== Expansion proposals ===
In April 2023, Cleanaway lodged an application to increase the approved annual waste-receipt limit at the park from 850,000 tonnes to 970,000 tonnes, together with proposed increases in garden organics processing capacity. Construction of a new garden organics facility on the western portion of the site commenced in January 2023, beginning with removal of vegetation and the first stage of diggings. Vegetation removed during the works was mulched and processed at the existing garden organics facility, while topsoil was retained on site for future reuse. Excavated material was stockpiled and crushed for use as day-to-day cover at the industrious landfill front. The project was undertaken in part to increase the supply of landfill cover material. Production of the leachate cut-off trench continued throughout the inspection period and was concluded in early 2024. Cleanaway has proposed an extension to the landfill to increase waste disposal capacity and expand associated waste-management infrastructure. The company has stated that the project is intended to address projected landfill-capacity constraints within the Sydney metropolitan area, where the facility is the only remaining putrescible landfill in the Sydney Basin.

Cleanaway has proposed a western extension of the landfill onto adjacent land owned by the facility. The proposal includes extending the landfill footprint into a new western area, relocating leachate storage ponds, stormwater infrastructure and associated pumping systems, temporarily stockpiling excavated material, and realigning Mill Creek along the western and northern boundaries of the site. It would also involve the construction of additional landfill cells, providing approximately 10 million cubic metres of additional landfill capacity, including a dedicated cell for restricted solid waste. The existing landfill is projected to reach capacity by 2030 and, if approved, the Western Extension Project would allow the facility to continue receiving up to 970,000 tonnes of Sydney's red-bin waste annually from 2031 until at least 2046.

Additional works include the treatment of leachate from the Elizabeth Drive Landfill at the Lucas Heights leachate treatment plant, landfill closure and rehabilitation activities, and the implementation of a revised landscape plan intended to support future passive recreational use following the completion of landfill operations. The proposed expansion is intended to address forecast shortages in Greater Sydney's landfill capacity. The proposed development area covers approximately 70.8 hectares, including areas of native vegetation and previously disturbed land. The project would involve vegetation clearing within designated disturbance areas, while other sections would be retained and managed for ecological regeneration. Existing landfill areas would also be recontoured as part of the final landform associated with the extension.

== Environmental performance ==
The landfill incorporates a range of environmental controls designed to minimise impacts on surrounding land and waterways. The base of the landfill is lined with a 2.5-millimetre-thick high-density polyethylene membrane over a substantial clay layer to prevent leachate from entering groundwater or nearby watercourses. Closed landfill areas are progressively capped with layers of rubble, soil and other cover materials before being rehabilitated as open space or bushland. Active landfill cells are also managed using containment measures, including perimeter netting to reduce the dispersal of wind-blown litter. The environmental operation of the park has been assessed through regulatory oversight, incident reporting, community complaints, odour management programs, site inspections, and consultation with government agencies. During the period covered by the 2024 autonomous environmental review, Cleanaway received three warning letters from the Department of Planning, Housing and Infrastructure (DPHI) relating to exceedances of approved waste-receipt limits, as well as an consultative letter from the NSW Environment Protection Authority (EPA) concerning the application of daily landfill cover.

In January 2022, Cleanaway notified DPHI that the facility had exceeded its approved annual waste limits during the 2021 calendar year. The company attributed the exceedance to increased waste volumes associated with flooding across Greater Sydney, reduced capacity at other landfill facilities, and operational challenges following its acquisition of the site from Suez Environnement. DPHI subsequently issued a warning letter for breaches of consent conditions relating to waste limits and incident reporting. A further exceedance occurred during 2022, when the facility received more waste than permitted under its development consent. Cleanaway cited the impacts of the 2022 eastern Australian floods, disruptions to waste transport infrastructure, flood clean-up operations, and reduced landfill capacity elsewhere in Sydney as contributing factors. In December 2022, DPHI issued another warning letter for non-compliance with the facility's approved waste-receipt limits and later sought additional information regarding waste volumes received at the site.

Throughout the audit duration, the facility received 69 complaints, of which 57 related to odour. This represented a decrease from the previous independent environmental audit, during which 98 complaints were recorded, including 96 odour-related complaints. A further eight complaints concerned noise. Seven of these were lodged by a resident of Barden Ridge and associated with noise generated by the leachate treatment factory at the former LH1 landfill site. Odour is an inherent by-product of landfill operations and is primarily associated with the decomposition of organic waste. Different waste streams and stages of decomposition can generate distinct odours, with older waste typically producing stronger and more acidic-smelling emissions than freshly deposited waste. However, the bushland around the site reduces the odour's impact on residents.
