= Heathcote National Park =

National park in Sydney, Australia

- IUCN category II (national park)
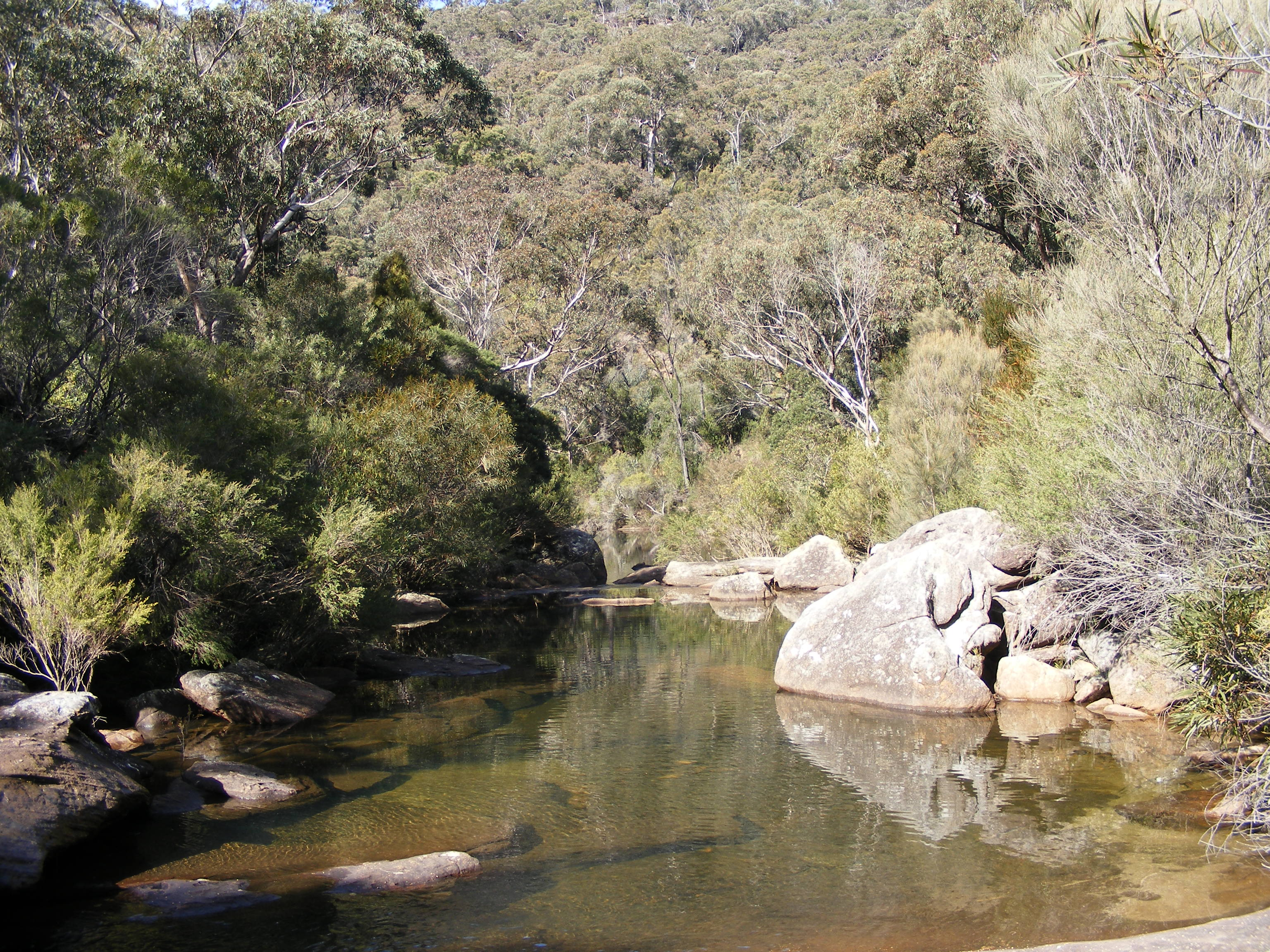
- A view of Heathcote Creek, looking north

- Location within New South Wales
- Location: New South Wales
- Nearest city: Sydney
- Coordinates: 34°07′49″S 150°58′17″E
- Area: 26.79 km^{2} (10.34 sq mi)
- Established: January 1943
- Governing body: NSW National Parks & Wildlife Service
- Website: Official website

Heathcote National Park is a protected national park in the southern area of Sydney, New South Wales in eastern Australia. The 2,679-hectare (6,620-acre) national park is situated approximately 35 kilometres (22 mi) southwest of the Sydney central business district, west of the Illawarra railway line, the Princes Highway and Motorway, and the suburbs of Heathcote and Waterfall.

== Geography ==
The park consists of 2,679 hectares of woodland, predominantly dry sclerophyll forest on the ridges and low heath in the wetter areas. The Hawkesbury sandstone has been carved up by various watercourses like Heathcote Creek, Kingfisher Creek and Myuna Creek, creating deep valleys. The Hawkesbury sandstone has created a sandy, infertile soil that is typical of the Sydney region.

The main walking track is the Bullawarring Track, which stretches from Waterfall to Heathcote. It largely follows the valley of Heathcote Creek, the main watercourse in the park, as well as utilizing a maintenance road that leads from Woronora Dam to Heathcote Road.

It is bounded by Holsworthy and Pleasure Point to the north, Heathcote and Lucas Heights to the east, the Greater Western Sydney region to the west (which include the suburbs of Glenfield, Macquarie Fields and Campbelltown), and Helensburgh to the south in the Illawarra. The Lucas Heights Resource Recovery Park occupies land along the northern boundary of the national park.

== History ==
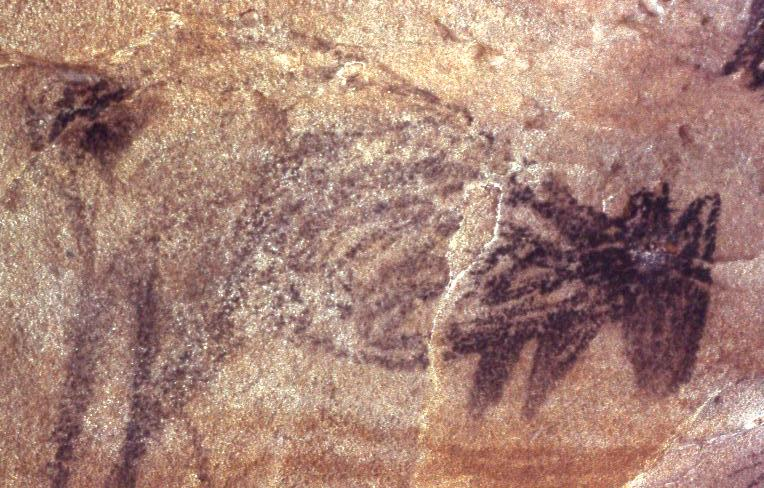
Aboriginal charcoal drawing along Myuna Creek

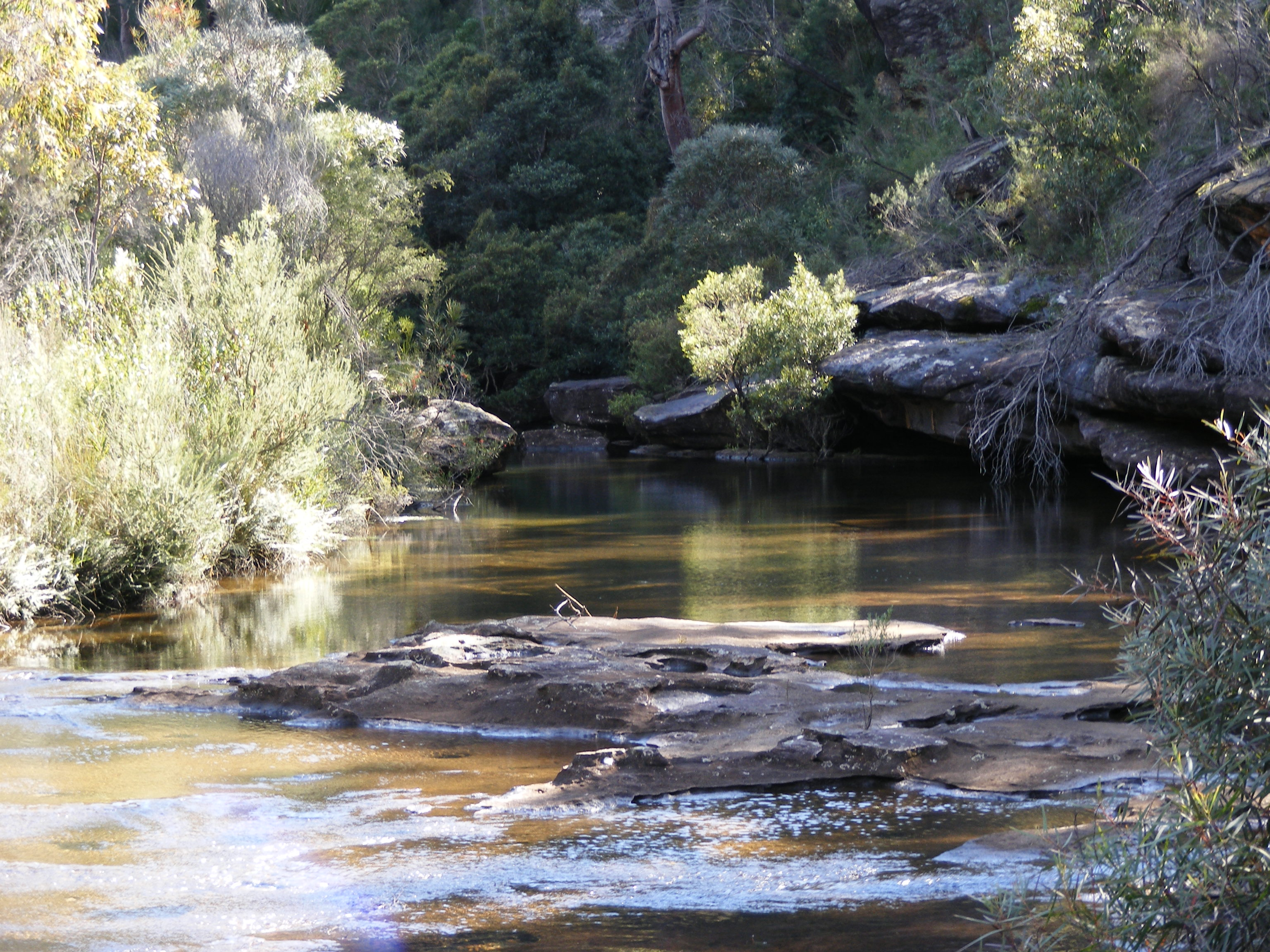
Heathcote Creek

Before European settlement, the Dharawal people, an Aboriginal Australian people, lived in the area. They left their mark at a number of known sites, which include shield trees along the Bullawarring Track and charcoal drawings along Myuna Creek. In addition, a number of Europeans lived in rough huts in the park during the Great Depression, leaving behind meagre ruins at places like Myuna Creek.

In the early 1930s, The Sydney Bushwalkers and the Mountain Trails Club of New South Wales had a lease on 75 hectares (190 acres) of land in the area, and were probably responsible for the creation of some of the early tracks and camp sites. This was the beginning of Heathcote National Park, which eventually grew to over two thousand hectares.

== Features ==
=== Landscape ===
The park consists of a deeply dissected Hawkesbury sandstone plateau, part of the Woronora Plateau The creek gorges include Heathcote Creek, a tributary of the Georges River. The sandstone was formed 200 million years ago, and periods of uplift began about 94 million years ago. Each period of uplift caused stream erosion, which cut more deeply into the plateau surface. Heathcote Creek cascades down a number of rock pools and small waterfalls to the Woronora River at the northern end of the park.

=== Flora ===
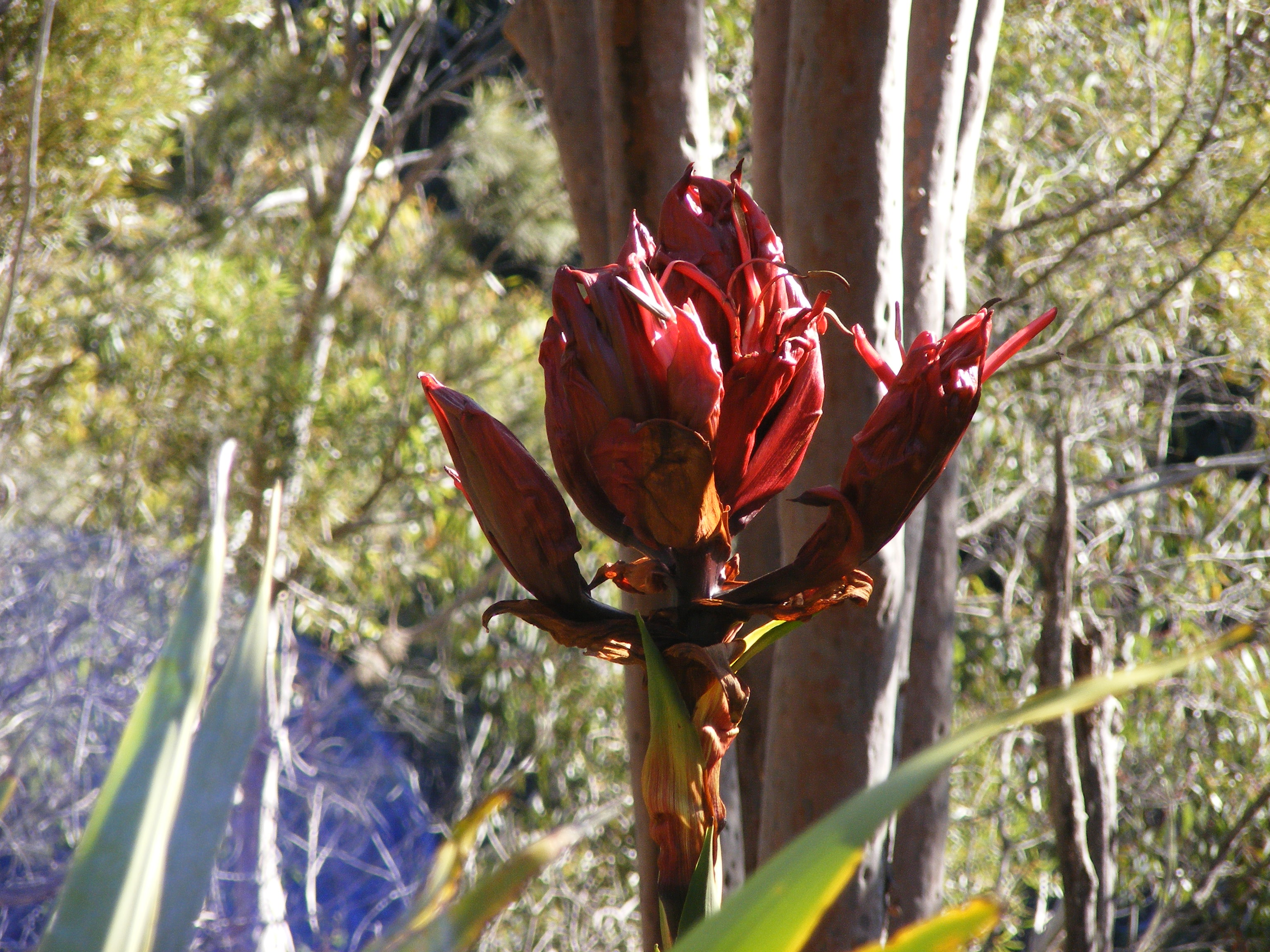
Gymea lilies

The ridges and drier slopes are covered in forest dominated by angophoras and eucalypts such as bloodwood, grey gum, Sydney peppermint, and scribbly gum. Grass-trees are common. Low heath growth consists of shrubs, including ti trees, banksias, hakeas, and waxflowers. Gymea lilies and forest oaks grow on the moister slopes. Blackbutts and grevilleas grow in the Heathcote Creek Valley.

=== Fauna ===
Sugar gliders, ring tail possums, and possibly eastern pygmy possums inhabit both Mirang Creek and Minda Gully. Swamp wallabies are also present. Honeyeaters are often seen, as well as superb lyrebirds. Fish, eels and crayfish are commonly found in the creeks.

== See also ==
- Protected areas of New South Wales
- Royal National Park
- Geography of Sydney
