= Comcare =

Statutory authority of the Australian Government

Coordinates: 35°16′34.90″S 149°07′41.94″E

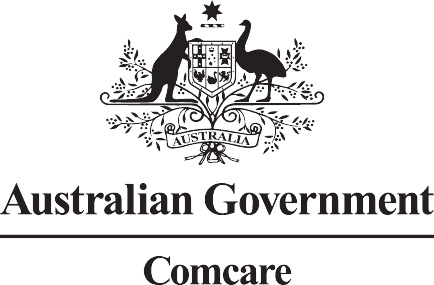

Agency overview
- Formed: 1988
- Jurisdiction: Australian Federal Government
- Employees: 620
- Minister responsible: Murray Watt, Minister for Employment and Workplace Relations
- Agency executive: Greg Vines, CEO
- Website: www.comcare.gov.au

Comcare is a statutory authority of the Australian Government established under the Safety, Rehabilitation and Compensation Act 1988 (SRC Act) and covered by the Public Governance, Performance and Accountability Act 2013 (PGPA Act). Comcare administers the Commonwealth's workers' compensation scheme under the SRC Act; and the Work Health and Safety Act 2011 (WHS Act).

The department is headquartered in Canberra, and has offices in Melbourne, Sydney, Brisbane, Adelaide, Perth, Newcastle, Darwin and Launceston. Since 2023 its current Chief Executive Officer is Greg Vines, former Deputy Director-General for the International Labour Organization (2012-2022).

Comcare also provides secretariat, policy and legislative support to Seacare - the Seafarers' Safety, Rehabilitation and Compensation Authority - in administering the Seafarers Rehabilitation and Compensation Act 1992, the Occupational Health and Safety (Maritime Industry) Act 1993, the Seafarers Rehabilitation and Compensation Levy Act 1992, and the Seafarers Rehabilitation and Compensation Levy Collection Act 1992.

Comcare provides advice to the Minister for Industrial Relations on issues relating to the administration of the Commonwealth's work health and safety and workers' compensation frameworks.

Comcare works with employees and other workers, employers, service providers and other organisations to:

- minimise the impact of harm in the workplace
- improve recovery at work and return to work
- promote the health benefits of good work™

== See also ==
- Comcare v Banerji
