= Brown v Tasmania =

Judgement of the High Court of Australia

- Court: High Court of Australia
- Full case name: Robert James Brown & Anor v The State of Tasmania
- Argued: 2-3 May 2017
- Decided: 18 October 2017
- Defendant: State of Tasmania
- Plaintiffs: Robert James Brown; Jessica Anne Willis Hoyt
- Citation: [2017] HCA 43
- Transcripts: 2 May [2017] HCATrans 93; Audio-visual recording; 3 May [2017] HCATrans 94; Audio-visual recording

Case opinions
- 5:2 provisions of the Workplaces (Protection from Protesters) Act 2014 (Tas) were invalid as they burdened the implied freedom of political communication
- Majority: Kiefel CJ, Bell, Gageler, Keane, Nettle JJ
- Concur/dissent: Gordon J
- Dissent: Edelman J

Brown v Tasmania, was a significant Australian court case, decided in the High Court of Australia on 18 October 2017. The case was an important decision about the implied freedom of political communication in the Australian Constitution in which the majority held that provisions of the Tasmanian Protesters Act were invalid as a burden on the implied freedom of political communication in a way that was not reasonably appropriate and adapted, or proportionate, to the legitimate purpose of protecting businesses and their operations.

== Background ==
In 2014 there was a change of government in Tasmania, under Liberal Premier Will Hodgman. Their pre-election legislative agenda included "rebuilding the forest industry" by "cracking down on illegal and dangerous protests in our forests". The purpose of the Protestors Act was to implement that policy and was intended to send a message to protest groups that intentionally disruptive protest action that prevents or hinders lawful business activity was not acceptable. The Protestors Act applied to protest activity which was defined as activity for the purposes of promoting awareness of or support for an opinion, or belief, in respect of a political, environmental, social, cultural or economic issue. A Tasmanian legal academic described the Protesters Act as being intended to silence protestors by turning protest into a crime.

Bob Brown, the former parliamentary leader of the Greens, had a long history with the Tasmanian environmental movement, being involved in the 1972 campaign to save Lake Pedder and blockading the Franklin Dam project in 1982, for which he spent 19 days in prison.

=== Facts ===
Brown, Jessica Hoyt and others were opposed to logging in the forest surrounding Lapoinya in North West Tasmania and were protesting in the forest when forestry operations were being conducted. In January 2016 they were arrested and charged with offences under the Protesters Act, however those charges were later dropped. Despite the charges being dropped, Brown and Hoyt sought to challenge the validity of the Protesters Act in the High Court. The Attorneys-General for the Commonwealth, NSW, Queensland, South Australia and Victoria intervened.

== Judgment ==
In applying the decision in Lange v Australian Broadcasting Corporation, the High Court had to consider three issues:

1. Does the law effectively burden freedom of political communication?
2. Is the purpose of the law legitimate, in the sense that it is compatible with the maintenance of the constitutionally prescribed system of government?
3. Is the law reasonably appropriate and adapted to advance that purpose in a manner compatible with the maintenance of the constitutionally prescribed system of government?

=== Burden on political communication ===
Six of the judges held that the law was a burden on political communication. The joint judgement of Kiefel CJ, Bell and Keane JJ noted that all 9 charges laid under the Protesters Act were discontinued "because the direction given was not correctly referable to 'business premises' or a 'business access area'", with the result that "some lawful protests will be prevented or discontinued and protesters will be deterred from further protesting." The deterrence of protesters from voicing their protests with respect to forest operations meant that the freedom of political communication was burdened.

The basis of the dissent by Edelman J was that the conduct was already prohibited, within his construction of the act; which through the principle of legality, he reached independently of the 6 other judges. The implied freedom of political communication does not apply when an action is already independently unlawful, hence Justice Edelman held that the Protesters Act did not impose a burden on the freedom. Edelman J emphasised that the court's primary duty is to construe relevant legislation, and if it is possible for a statute to be construed consistently with the constitution, it should be so construed in preference to a construction that would result in the act being held invalid, ‘even if it is perceived to be opaque, fudged, or irrational’. at [484].

=== Purpose of the law ===
All of the judges held that the Protesters Act had a legitimate purpose, being to ensure that protesters do not obstruct the carrying out of business activities.

=== Reasonably appropriate and adapted ===
Kiefel CJ, Bell and Keane JJ held that the principal problem was a practical one, in that the definition of areas to which the Protesters Act applied were so vague that it would often not be possible for police or protesters to determine the boundaries of a prohibited area. The implication for the freedom of political communication was not that the charges were unlikely to succeed, but rather that "lawful protests will be prevented or discontinued and protesters will be deterred from further protesting" because of the police direction, "even if there is no basis in law for the direction". Kiefel CJ, Bell and Keane JJ held that two provisions were not for the legitimate purpose of preventing damage or disruption, but for the purpose of deterring protest. The two provisions were the four day exclusion following a direction from a police officer and the capacity of a police officer to exclude a group of people from an area without having to consider whether each person was about to contravene the Protestors Act.

The test applied by Kiefel CJ, Bell and Keane JJ as to whether the law was reasonably appropriate was to consider the proportionality of the law in relation to the burden, by use of criteria of suitability, necessity and balance. The Forestry Management Act already achieved the legitimate purpose of preventing damage and disruption and therefore the additional burden on the freedom failed the criteria of suitability and necessity without the need to consider the criteria of balance.

Gageler J agreed with the result but gave very different reasons, disagreeing that the proper test was proportionality. The practical difficulty he found with the provisions was not that they were vague or imprecise, but that the practical ability of a person to express a particular political view was significantly burdened by the broad discretion conferred on police officers, based on the formation of a reasonable belief, emphasising "the breadth and severity of the consequences".

Nettle J substantially agreed with the joint judgment and applied the same test of proportionality. He was not persuaded that the significantly heavier penalties were themselves a burden on the freedom. Like Gageler J, Nettle J focused on the police powers that arose from a reasonable belief, merely because a person could be required to leave the forestry land because the police officer believed they had been obstructive in the past or seemed likely to be in the future, a direction that would be lawful even if the police officer were wrong.

While Gordon J concurred with the majority that the law was a burden on the freedom and that the blanket, four-day exclusion was not appropriate and adapted to the purpose, her dissent was that the burden was slight, doing "no more than regulate the time, place and manner" of protest activities. She was thus satisfied that the law was for the most part reasonably appropriate and adapted to the purpose.

== Significance ==
The decision is significant in at least three areas:

1. the continuation of environmental protests in Tasmanian forests;
2. calling into question the validity of similar legislation in NSW, and Western Australia; and
3. the use of proportionality as a test of constitutional validity.

The origin of the test of proportionality can be traced to the 1819 decision of the Supreme Court of the United States in McCulloch v Maryland where Chief Justice Marshall said that it was a matter for Congress to choose how its powers were exercised, within the limits of the constitution, stating:

Let the end be legitimate, let it be within the scope of the constitution, and all means which are appropriate, which are plainly adapted to that end, which are not prohibited, but consist with the letter and spirit of the constitution, are constitutional.

The use of proportionality as a test of constitutional validity starts from the perspective that the freedom of political communication is not unlimited, that the various Australian parliaments may make valid laws that affect the exercise of political communication, and that it is generally up to the parliament to decide whether it should make that value judgment. The question therefore involves the High Court itself making a value judgement about whether the pursuit of a legitimate purpose goes too far. In this regard the debate is the extent to which the High Court defers to the value judgment made by the parliament.
