= Pappas v. Giuliani =

- Court: United States Court of Appeals for the Second Circuit
- Full case name: Thomas Pappas v. Rudy Giuliani & Howard Safir
- Citations: 118 F. Supp. 2d 443, 445 (S.D.N.Y. 2000), 290 F.3d 143 (2d Cir. 2002)

Case history
- Prior history: S.D.N.Y. Index No. 00 Civ. 0320
- Subsequent history: U.S. Supreme Court, Docket No. 02-1441 (denied the petition)

Holding
- The New York Police Department did not violate Pappas' First Amendment rights by terminating his employment after he anonymously spread bigoted and racist speech in violation of department regulations.

Court membership
- Judges sitting: Sotomayor, Leval, McMahon

Case opinions
- Majority: Leval, joined by McMahon
- Concurrence: McMahon
- Dissent: Sotomayor

Pappas v. Giuliani, 290 F.3d 143 (2002), was a case in which the United States Court of Appeals for the Second Circuit held that the First Amendment to the United States Constitution was not violated when a police officer was fired for mailing out racially offensive political materials from his home.

== Facts ==
Thomas Pappas was dismissed by the New York City Police Department for anonymously mailing from his home racially offensive political materials to political and other groups that had solicited him for donations. Pappas was fired for mailing out the material. The Appeals court held that the Police Department's action had not infringed on the plaintiff's Pappas's rights under the First Amendment.

== Majority opinion ==
Judge Pierre N. Leval, with Judge Colleen McMahon concurring, found the firing of Pappas was permissible under the Pickering test. The views Pappas expressed, the finding held, might undermine the effectiveness of the department. They further held that, despite his mailing anonymously, the mailing of the material was seeking to publicize his view. They quote Oliver Wendell Holmes Jr. in the case McAuliffe v. Mayor of New Bedford, "A policeman may have a constitutional right to [speak his mind], but he has no constitutional right to be a policeman."

== Sotomayor dissenting opinion ==
Sonia Sotomayor dissented from the majority's decision to award summary judgment to the police department. Although Sotomayor acknowledged that the speech was "patently offensive, hateful, and insulting," she warned the majority about "gloss[ing] over three decades of jurisprudence and the centrality of First Amendment freedoms in our lives just because it is confronted with speech it does not like."

Sotomayor argued that Supreme Court precedent required the court to consider not only the NYPD's mission and community relations but also that Pappas was neither a policymaker nor a cop on the beat. Moreover, Pappas's speech was anonymous, "occur[ring] away from the office on [his] own time." She expressed sympathy for the NYPD's "concerns about race relations in the community," which she described as "especially poignant," but at the same time emphasized that the NYPD had substantially contributed to the problem by disclosing the results of its investigation into the racist mailings to the public. In the end, she concluded, the NYPD's race relations concerns "are so removed from the effective functioning of the public employer that they cannot prevail over the free speech rights of the public employee."

== See also ==
- New York City Police Department corruption and misconduct
- Employment discrimination law in the United States
