= Tort law in Australia =

Aspect of Australian law

The system of tort law in Australia is broadly similar to that in other common law countries. However, some divergences in approach have occurred as its independent legal system has developed.

Some of these differences include Australia-specific nuances involving: (1) what torts are recognised, (2) the steps to establish liability, and (3) calculations for awards of damages.

These differences have emerged due to both legislative reform, as well as common law developments.

== Overview ==
Throughout Australia's early history, its tort jurisprudence largely complied with UK precedent. In more recent years, its jurisprudence has diverged from the UK and other common law countries.

Developments in Australian Tort law are most powerfully driven by the High Court of Australia. In doing so, the High court frequently refers to other apex courts around the world for comparative law purposes. It has said that it is 'inevitable and desirable that the courts of this country will continue to obtain assistance and guidance from the learning and reasoning of other great common law courts'.

Over the years, differences of application have emerged in Australia's tests for causation, duty of care, calculation of damages, amongst other areas. These have been documented by academics. Specific differences include the 'salient features' framework used to determine a duty of care for negligence, and the lack of an intent element for the tort of trespass.

To the extent tort law is defined by Australia's nationally uniform common law, its tort regime is also nationally unified. (Note: Lipohar v The Queen (‘Lipohar’) (1999) 200 CLR 485) However, due to the fact that Australian State parliaments are able to modify law within their own jurisdictions through statute; in practice each State has its own quirks. There have been attempts on occasion to unify tort law between the States to some extent.

== Statutory reform ==
Parliaments have occasionally decided it necessary to modify the law of torts to address public concerns. A prominent historical example of this is the 1897 Workmen's Compensation legislation, which was enacted in response a perceived failure of the common law to address risks of harm to workers during industrialisation.

Other major reforms affecting tortious liability has included the Trade Practices Act 1974 and the state Fair Trading Acts.

From the early 1980s legislative intervention attempted to reduce the high volume of litigation involving motor vehicle and industrial accidents. Parallel to the rise of Thatcherism in the United Kingdom, in all Australian states common law torts were significantly modified. Speedy "no fault" compensation was made available to workers and victims of motor vehicle accidents in Tasmania, Victoria and the Northern Territory.

=== The decline of HIH Insurance, the Ipp Review and beyond ===
Since 2002 there has been an acceleration of legislative change, driven by a perceived crisis in the price and availability of insurance, which was largely blamed on the law of negligence. The issue became charged politically, reinforced by the direct liability of government and its role as a re-insurer of last resort. New South Wales, the most litigious state, had commenced legislative change prior to 2002. Following the collapse of HIH Insurance and the related escalation in insurance premiums in public liability and medical negligence, the NSW proposals were adopted more widely throughout Australia.

== Elements of various torts ==
=== Tort of Invasion of privacy ===
There is currently no freestanding tort for the invasion of privacy in Australian law. In ABC v Lenah Games Meats in 2001, the High Court left open the possibility of the tort being recognised in future. The court has also held that Victoria Park Racing v Taylor did not inhibit the development of privacy law in Australia.

Puisne decisions entertaining the possibility of the tort have occurred in at least two states. One noteworthy decision was a District Court of Queensland award of damages for the invasion of privacy by Judge Skoien. Another was a decision of Justice Gillard of the Supreme Court of Victoria in Giller v Procopets, in which the Court held the law had 'not developed to the point where the law in Australia recognises an action for breach of privacy' Both cases were settled out of court and, as a result, did not proceed to appeal; and so have no value as legal precedent.

The Australian Law Reform Commission has recommended the Commonwealth create a private right to sue for a serious invasion of privacy. The body has argued that by describing the action as a tort, courts will be encouraged to draw upon established principles of tort law (which it hopes would promote a measure of certainty and consistency to the law). It also considers the enactment of such a cause of action would bring Australia into line with recent common law developments concerning serious invasions of privacy in common law jurisdictions.

=== Defamation ===
Australia's defamation law emerged from English common law, but has since evolved in application though statute and judicial decisions. To the extent Australia's system retains commonalities with English law, UK jurisprudence retains value as providing guidance to Australian courts.

One key tension in Australia is a need for defamation law to strike an appropriate balance between the protection of an individual's reputation and values relating to free speech; as well as constitutional protections of political communication. Many of the complexities that arise from defamation proceedings are said to derive from judicial attempts to maintain that balance. The decision of Lange v ABC is an example of a case where Australia's constitutional free speech protections were assessed in the context of a defamation proceeding.

=== Wrongful life ===
A wrongful life claim is one in which a child plaintiff brings an action against a doctor who negligently diagnosed the plaintiff's mother. Usually, the doctor failed to diagnose rubella during the first trimester, for which there is no cure and which will inevitably cause profound disabilities in the unborn child. Had the mother been correctly diagnosed, she would have exercised her legal right to abortion.

In May 2006, the majority of the High Court rejected wrongful life, refusing to accept that life can be considered a compensable harm. This means that children who are born disabled as a result of a doctor's (admitted) negligence cannot claim damages. Parents are able to pursue 'wrongful birth' claims if the child (disabled or not) is the outcome of a negligently performed sterilisation procedure. However, since the Civil Liability Act, they cannot recover the costs of raising the child in New South Wales.

== Litigation ==
Tort law occupies much of the time of the various Magistrates, Local, District and County Courts and a substantial proportion of the time of the Supreme Courts of each of the states and territories. In addition, there are numerous specialist tribunals dealing with workers' compensation and other cases. Road accident victims are far more likely to make claims and receive tort compensation than any other group This predominance is due not so much to the law of torts, but the fact that liability insurance is compulsory by statute in all Australian states.

== List of torts available in Australia ==
The below is a list of distinct torts relevant to Australian law

Well-established torts

- Breach of public and statutory duties
  - Public nuisance
  - Breach of statutory duties
  - Interferences with the judicial process
- Defamation
- Interference with employment and family relations
  - Actions per quod servitium amisit (injuring an employee rendering them unable to perform services for their employer)
  - Loss of consortium of a spouse (abolished in New South Wales, Tasmania, Western Australia, and the Australian Capital Territory.
- Intentional damage to economic interests
  - Interference with contractual relations
  - Conspiracy
  - Intimidation
- Negligence
- Misrepresentation
  - Deceit
  - Innocent misrepresentation/negligent advice
  - Defamation in Australia
  - Injurious falsehood
  - Passing off
- Trespass
  - against the person – assault, battery, and false imprisonment.
  - against chattels, (personal property)
  - to land
- Occupation or possession of land
  - Private nuisance;
  - Cattle/livestock trespass
  - Liability for animals (scienter)

Torts where the availability is not certain

- Invasion of privacy

Defunct torts

- Loss of consortium
