= Commonwealth Law Reports =

Reports of decisions of the High Court of Australia

Commonwealth Law Reports (CLR)
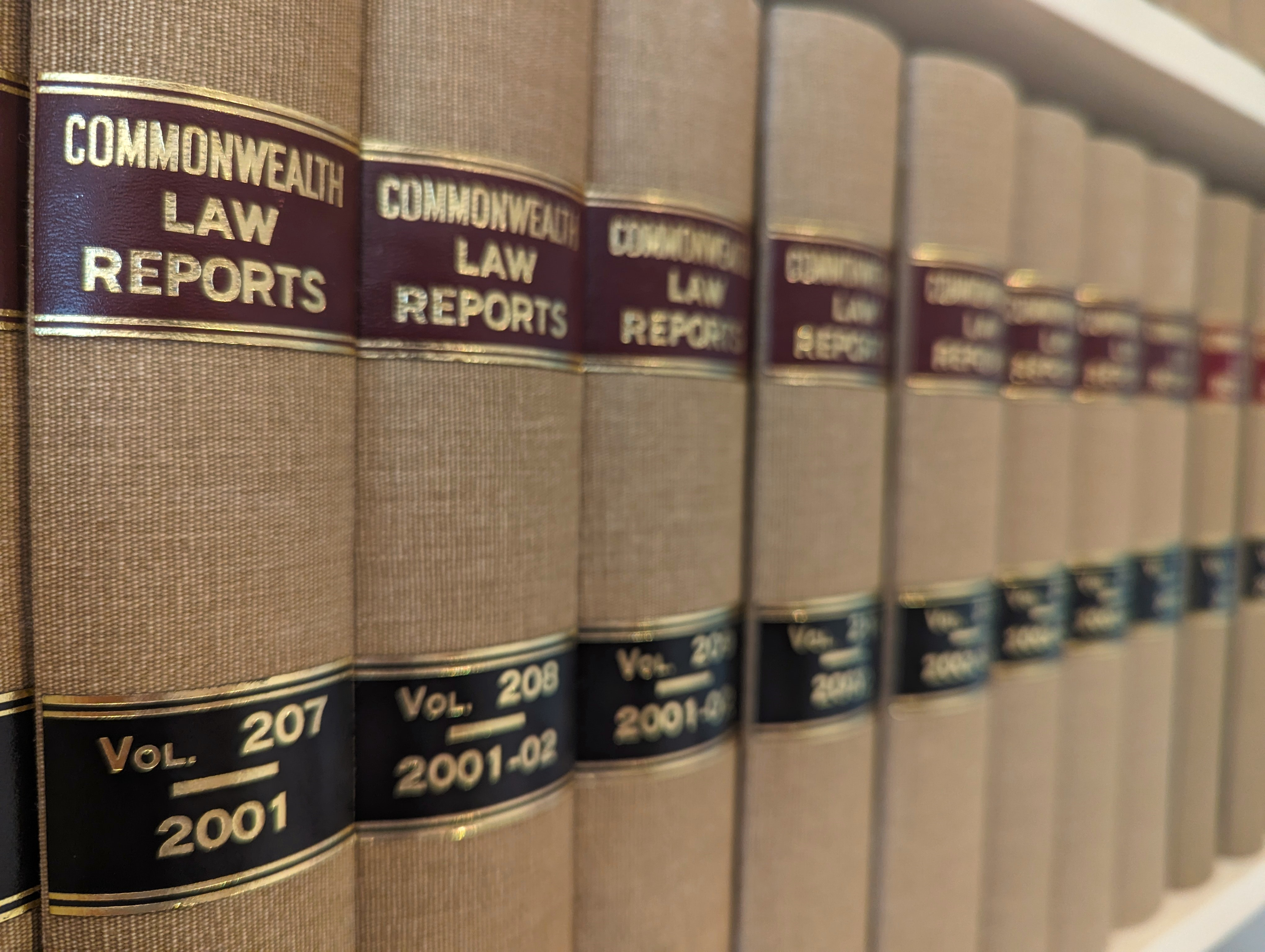
- Selected volumes of the CLRs.
- Editors: Paul Vout KC and Peter Willis SC
- Subject: Law Report
- Publisher: Lawbook Co., a division of Thomson Reuters
- Publication date: April 1903–
- Publication place: Australia
- Media type: Print / Online

The Commonwealth Law Reports (CLR) (ISSN 0069-7133) are the authorised reports of decisions of the High Court of Australia. The Commonwealth Law Reports are published by the Lawbook Company, a division of Thomson Reuters. James Merralls AM QC was the editor of the Reports from 1969 until his death in 2016. The current editors are Paul Vout KC and Peter Willis SC.

Each reported judgment includes a headnote written by an expert reporter (by convention, a practising barrister) which, as an authorised report, has been approved by the High Court. The current reporters are as follows:

- Hannah Canham
- Roshan Chaile
- Bora Kaplan SC
- Alex Lee
- James McComish
- William Newland
- Patrick O'Bryan-Gusah
- Jakub Patela
- Stephen Puttick
- Daniel Reynolds
- Marcus Roberts
- Alexander Solomon-Bridge SC
- Ahmed Terzic
- Michael Wells
- Radhika Withana

The headnotes include a summary of counsel's legal arguments. The Reports also include tables of cases reported, affirmed, reversed, overruled, applied or judicially commented on and cited.

The Reports are available in PDF format from Westlaw AU. Scans of the first 100 volumes of the Reports, covering cases from 1903 to 1959, were freely published on the High Court's website and on BarNet JADE as part of the One-100 project.

== Editors and reporters ==
The editors of the Commonwealth Law Reports from time to time have been as follows:

Editors of the Commonwealth Law Reports
#	Editor	Volumes	Years
1	James C Anderson	1–18	1903–1914
2	Alfred H Hayball	19–50	1914–1934
3	E F Healy	49–64	1933–1941
4	H Headen Cuthbert (Assistant Editor)	51–58	1934–1937
5	B Sugerman KC	64–70	1940–1945
6	B P Macfarlan QC	70–99	1945–1958
7	R A Howell	99–120	1957–1970
8	A J Leslie (Assistant Editor)	114	1965
9	M G Morley (Assistant Editor)	117–122	1967–1970
10	J D Merralls AM QC	118–257	1968–2016
11	C J Horan KC	256–275	2016–2024
12	P T Vout KC	256–	2016–
13	P G Willis SC	276–	2024–

The reporters of the Commonwealth Law Reports from time to time have been as follows:

Reporters of the Commonwealth Law Reports
#	Reporter	Volumes	Years
1	W A Barton	1	1903–1904
2	Bennet Langton	1–41	1903–1929
3	H E Manning	1–3	1903–1906
4	C A White	1–10	1903–1910
5	N G Pilcher	3–4	1905–1907
6	H V Jaques	5–12	1908–1911
7	C E Weigall	9–12	1910–1911
8	Norman McGhie	16–19	1912–1915
9	D Gavan Duffy	17–20	1913–1915
10	A L Campbell	18–19	1914–1915
11	R T Gore	20–22	1915–1917
12	C A Weston	21–26	1915–1919
13	Neil McTague	25–38	1918–1927
14	J L Wassell	30–39	1921–1927
15	P V Feltham	38–39	1926–1927
16	E F Healy	39–42, 66–86	1926–1930, 1942–1953
17	G S Reed	39–40	1926–1928
18	B J Jeffries	39–90	1926–1954
19	Joseph Bales	40–104	1927–1961
20	H Dallas Wiseman	41–66	1928–1943
21	C C Brebner	41–83	1928–1951
22	R C Wright	44–79	1930–1949
23	Oliver J Gillard	62–68	1939–1944
24	B Buller Murphy	66	1942–1943
25	F T P Burt QC	78–102	1948–1960
26	J R Rex	79–87	1949–1953
27	Brian Hunter	83–125	1950–1971
28	Russell D Barton	86–102	1952–1960
29	G D Needham	88–93	1953–1956
30	M G Everett	88–95	1953–1957
31	R A Howell	90–98	1953–1958
32	W J Cuthbert	91–92	1954–1955
33	J M Macrossan	93–95	1954–1957
34	T J Lehane	96–111	1956–1964
35	G H Smith	99–105	1957–1961
36	Richard H Searby	99–103	1957–1960
37	C S C Sheller	101–114	1959–1966
38	J D Merralls	103–117	1959–1968
39	G A Kennedy	103–139	1959–1978
40	R K Todd	103–104	1959–1961
41	J D Phillips	104–109	1960–1964
42	R C Tadgell	105–108	1960–1963
43	R L Hunter	106–111	1961–1964
44	B M Debelle QC	106–154	1961–1984
45	C Brettingham-Moore	106–120	1961–1970
46	I C F Spry	109–134	1963–1976
47	R Smart	112–114	1964–1966
48	Rodney Parker	112–115	1964–1966
49	M G Morley	112–127	1964–1972
50	Michael Lazar	115–116	1965–1967
51	Peter R Graham	116–119	1966–1970
52	Naida Haxton	116–123	1966–1971
53	R A Sundberg QC	118–183	1968–1995
54	G K Downes	120–140	1969–1978
54	H G Fryberg QC	120–154	1969–1984
55	R M Webster	121–140	1969–1978
56	A C Archibald	129–136	1972–1977
57	R C Macaw	133–144	1974–1980
58	M W D White	133–152	1974–1983
59	C J S M Carr	137–177	1976–1993
60	J H Karkar	141–159	1978–1985
61	J G Santamaria	141–168	1978–1990
62	J M Bennett	155–182	1983–1995
63	M Sloss	166–182	1988–1995
64	J D Elliott	173–197	1991–1999
65	K H Bell QC	183–189	1994–1997
66	G S Clarke SC	183–252	1994–2014
67	S G E McLeish	183–221	1994–2005
68	D S Mortimer	183–190	1994–1997
69	C M Caleo	188–208	1996–2002
70	G B Johnston	188–195	1996–1999
71	M K Moshinsky SC	189–231	1997–2007
72	W A Harris	190	1997
73	D J Batt	193–223	1998–2005
74	M Y Bearman	193–250	1998–2013
75	P D Crutchfield	194–220	1998–2005
76	J E Richards	194–228	1998–2006
77	P G Willis SC	199–256, 269	1999–2016, 2019
78	D W Bennett	202–208	2000–2002
79	L G De Ferrari	209–242	2001–2011
80	C J Horan KC	209–256	2001–2016
81	P T Vout	209–256	2001–2016
82	S P Donaghue	210–220	2003–2005
83	G J Ahern	221–242	2006–2011
84	M I Borsky	222–257	2006–2016
85	E M Kingston	223–235	2005–2008
86	C K M Lye	224–250	2005–2013
87	J A Redwood	224–258	2005–2016
88	C G Button	227–256	2005–2016
89	D F C Thomas	227–240	2005–2010
90	A D Pound SC	232–277	2008–2024
91	C P Young	235–256	2007–2016
92	P D Herzfeld	240–257	2009–2016
93	N M Wood	243–263	2011–2014
94	B W Jellis	244–254	2011–2015
95	A M Dinelli KC	246–267	2012–2020
96	A F Solomon-Bridge SC	248–	2012–
97	C J Tran	253–270	2013–2021
98	H A Tiplady	255–263	2014–2018
99	R Chaile	258–	2015–
100	M A Hosking	258–268	2015–2020
101	J A G McComish	258–286	2015–2027
102	S Zeleznikow	258–270	2015–2021
103	O M Ciolek	259–272	2016–2022
104	R W Kruse	259–271	2016–2022
105	M J Wells	259–	2016–
106	R Withana	260–	2016–
107	J Anthony-Shaw	261–262	2016–2018
108	W J Newland	268-	2019-
109	E J Delany	268–276	2019–2024
110	J D Williams	269–276	2020–2024
111	D J Reynolds	271–	2020–
112	B D Kaplan SC	270–	2021–
113	J R Wang	271–283	2021–2026
114	S D Puttick	273–	2023–
115	J Patela	274–	2023–
116	A Terzic	278–	2024–
117	H Canham	280–	2024–
118	M Roberts	280–	2024–
119	P O'Bryan-Gusah	284–	2026–
120	A Lee	286–	2026–

== Citation ==
For lawyers, the Commonwealth Law Reports are the preferred source for decisions of the High Court of Australia. An example of proper citation is:

Coleman v Power (2004) 220 CLR 1

This citation indicates that the decision of the Court in the case entitled Coleman v Power, decided in 2004, can be found beginning at page 1 of volume 220 of the Commonwealth Law Reports.

An alternative citation, which is medium neutral, is:

Coleman v Power [2004] HCA 39

This citation refers to the case entitled Coleman v Power, which was the 39th decision published by the High Court of Australia in 2004.

Both forms of citation (parallel citations) may be used so that users can access the case from different sources:

Coleman v Power [2004] HCA 39; (2004) 220 CLR 1

However, Australian Guide to Legal Citation rule 2.2.7 advises against parallel citations for Australian cases.

== See also ==
- Law report
- List of Law Reports in Australia
- The Law Reports
- United States Reports
- Supreme Court Reports (Canada)
