= Lange v Australian Broadcasting Corporation =

1997 Australian High Court case

- Court: High Court of Australia
- Full case name: David Lange v Australian Broadcasting Corporation (ABC)
- Decided: 8 July 1997
- Citations: [1997] HCA 25, (1997) 189 CLR 520

Court membership
- Judges sitting: Brennan CJ, Dawson, Toohey, Gaudron, McHugh, Gummow and Kirby JJ

Case opinions
- (7:0) The Court decided to reconsider Theophanous and Stephens, and decided that those cases were incorrect. The Constitution does not confer personal rights as to the implied freedom of political communication

Lange v Australian Broadcasting Corporation is a High Court of Australia case that upheld the existence of an implied freedom of political communication in the Australian Constitution, but found that it did not necessarily provide a defence to a defamation action. The High Court extended the defence of qualified privilege to be compatible with the freedom of political communication.

== Background ==
The plaintiff, David Lange, who was the Prime Minister of New Zealand, was the subject of a report on the Australian Broadcasting Corporation current affairs program Four Corners. He brought defamation proceedings in respect of that broadcast.

In April 1990, the defendant broadcast on its Four Corners program a report which had been broadcast the previous night in New Zealand on Television New Zealand's Frontline program. The program alleged that the New Zealand Labour Party, then in government, had come to be improperly under the influence of large business interests as a result of those interests making large donations to New Zealand Labour's 1987 election campaign funds.

The plaintiff was the Prime Minister of New Zealand at the relevant time referred to in the report. He contended, among other things, that the report conveyed the false and defamatory imputations that, as Prime Minister, he:

a. had permitted big business donors to dictate government policy, and had allowed public assets to be sold to some of those donors in repayment for their donations;

b. had abused, and was unfit to hold, public office in that he had permitted a debt incurred by his party in the election campaign to be written off by awarding a government contract to the creditor;

c. was corrupt and deceitful in that he had accepted gifts of shares and profits on share trading from a leading business figure, and had permitted that figure to set up a share trading account on his behalf, all in return for permitting the business figure to influence government policy in favour of business interests.

== Decision ==
=== Implied freedom of political communication ===
In a unanimous judgment, the court sought to clarify the interaction between the implied freedom of political communication and defamation laws, and the applicability of the implied freedom to state as well as commonwealth matters. The implied freedom was held to be an ongoing freedom, and not limited to election periods. The freedom's purpose is grounded on the functioning of democratic and responsible government, requiring freedom of communication between the voters and their representatives. The continuous nature of the freedom is justified by the concept of representative government, requiring the freedom to operate continuously, and not merely during election periods.

The implied freedom was held to be a negative right, not a grant of a free-standing positive right, and operated chiefly as a restraint on executive and legislative power to the extent that such power would burden the implied freedom. The Court thus overturned its earlier decisions in Theophanous v Herald & Weekly Times Ltd and Stephens v West Australian Newspapers.

The Court modified the requirements of the common law defence of qualified privilege because the existing defence did not adequately accommodate the requirements of the implied freedom of political communication. The Court suggested that qualified privilege ordinarily deals with situations where there is reciprocity between the duty of the publisher to inform and the interest of readers in receiving that information. In the context of a publication about governmental or political affairs, the Court held that all voters have an interest in receiving information about such matters. There is hence a duty on publishers to publish that information. In such situations, the Court held that the reasonableness of the publisher in all the circumstances becomes a pertinent issue. Where it was reasonable for the publisher to publish potentially defamatory information, that is a defence to defamation proceedings.

The Court developed a two-part test:

1. Does the law effectively burden freedom of communication about government or political matters? The scope of political communication was narrowed from Theophanous, to mean matters that could affect their choice at elections, or the affairs of federal ministers and the executive.
2. If the law does burden that freedom, is the law reasonably appropriate and adapted to serve a legitimate end which is compatible with the maintenance of representative and responsible government? The objectives of the government in making the law are considered; in this case, the Court accepted that protecting the reputation of individuals was appropriate and adapted.

Factors which may inform the requirement of reasonableness include:

- whether the publisher had reasonable grounds to believe the defamatory matter to be true
- did the publisher take reasonable steps to verify the accuracy of the material?
- did the publisher not believe the imputation to be untrue?
- did the publisher seek a response from the person affected by the publication, or was it unnecessary or impracticable to do so?

The defendants also claimed qualified privilege under the Defamation Act 1974 (NSW), which the court held to be appropriate and adapted.

In 2015 the High Court in McCloy v NSW revised the test of whether the law in question impinges on the implied freedom of political communication through a three-step test:

1. Does the law effectively burden the freedom of communication about government or political matters either in its terms, operation of effect?
2. Is the purpose of the law and the means adopted to achieve that purpose compatible with the maintenance of constitutionally prescribed system of representative government?
3. Is the law reasonably appropriate and adapted to advance that legitimate object? This is analysed through three stages. First, the suitability requirement requires that the law have a rational connection to the purpose of the provision. Secondly, the necessity requirement considers whether there are any obvious and compelling alternative, reasonably practicable means of achieving the relevant purpose in a way which has a less restrictive effect on the freedom. Finally, the adequacy on balance requirement considers whether there is a balance between the 'positive effect of realising the law's proper purpose with the negative effect of the limits on constitutional rights or freedom'.

=== Reconsideration of Theophanous and Stephens ===
The Court was prepared to reconsider the reasoning of the decisions in Theophanous and Stephens because neither of the cases contained strong constitutional law principles. In both earlier cases, Deane J agreed with Mason CJ, Toohey and Gaudron JJ on the outcome, but he differed in the view of the scope of the implied freedom.

=== Common law and Constitution ===
The Court held that the "common law must conform with the Constitution", and the common law cannot run "counter to constitutional imperatives". The common law and constitutional law questions differ: the common law question defines the scope of the right of the defamed, while the constitutional law question specifies the area that cannot be infringed by a Commonwealth or State/Territory law.

=== External matters ===
Although this case does not entirely clarify the issue, discussion of matters at other levels of government (such as at State or Territory level) may impact federal matters, so the fact that Lange was from New Zealand does not preclude the matter.

== See also ==
- Lange v Atkinson (New Zealand case)
- Australian constitutional law
