= Bragg =

Bragg may refer to:

== Places ==
- Bragg City, Missouri, United States
- Bragg, Texas, a ghost town, United States
- Bragg, West Virginia, an unincorporated community, United States
- Electoral district of Bragg, a state electoral district in South Australia, Australia
- Mount Bragg, Queen Elizabeth Land, Antarctica
- Bragg Islands, Graham Land, Antarctica
- Bragg (crater), a crater on the Moon

== People and fictional characters ==
- Bragg (surname), a list of people and fictional characters with the surname
- Dobby Bragg, a pseudonym of American blues musician Roosevelt Sykes (1906–1983)
- Bragg, also known as Experiment 145 and by the English dub name "Flute", an alien character in the Stitch! anime series

== Other uses ==
- Bragg Institute, former name of the Australian Centre for Neutron Scattering, a neutron and X-ray scattering group in Australia
- Bragg Communications, a Canadian cable television provider
- Bragg Live Food Products, Inc, a health food company started by Paul Bragg
- Bragg Memorial Stadium, a football stadium in Tallahassee, Florida

== See also ==
- Bragg Box, a type of traveling museum exhibit invented by Laura Bragg
- Bragg House (disambiguation), various houses on the National Register of Historic Places
- Fort Bragg, North Carolina, a major US Army base
- Fort Bragg, California, a city in coastal Mendocino County
- Camp Bragg (Arkansas), a Confederate encampment during the American Civil War
- Bragg's Mill, Ashdon, an English windmill
- Brag (disambiguation)
- Bragge, a surname
- Braggs (disambiguation)
