= Australia and weapons of mass destruction =

Australia does not possess weapons of mass destruction, although it has participated in extensive research into nuclear, biological and chemical weapons in the past.

Australia chairs the Australia Group, an informal grouping of countries that seek to minimise the risk of assisting chemical and biological weapon proliferation. All states participating in the Australia Group are parties to the Chemical Weapons Convention and the Biological Weapons Convention, and strongly support efforts under those Conventions to rid the world of chemical and biological weapons.

As with chemical and biological weapons, Australia does not possess nuclear weapons and is not seeking to develop them.

== Biological weapons ==
Australia has advanced research programs in immunology, microbiology and genetic engineering that support an industry providing vaccines for domestic use and export. It also has an extensive wine industry and produces microorganisms on an industrial scale to support other industries including agriculture, food technology and brewing. The dual-use nature of these facilities mean that Australia, like any country with advanced biotechnological industries, could easily produce biological warfare agents. The Australian Centre for Disease Preparedness in Geelong, Victoria is researching the Ebola virus. The Australian Microbial Resources Research Network lists 37 culture collections, many of which hold samples of pathogenic organisms for legitimate research purposes.

=== History ===
In the wake of the Japanese advance through South East Asia during World War II, the secretary of the Australian Department of Defence, Frederick Shedden, wrote to virologist Macfarlane Burnet on 24 December 1946 and invited him to attend a meeting of top military officers to discuss biological warfare.

In September 1947, Burnet was invited to join the chemical and biological warfare subcommittee of the New Weapons and Equipment Development Committee and subsequently prepared a secret report titled "Note on War from a Biological Angle". In 1951 the subcommittee recommended that "a panel reporting to the chemical and biological warfare subcommittee should be authorised to report on the offensive potentiality of biological agents likely to be effective against the local food supplies of South-East Asia and Indonesia".

The activities of the chemical and biological warfare subcommittee were scaled back soon after, as Prime Minister Robert Menzies was more interested in trying to acquire nuclear weapons. Australia signed the Biological Weapons Convention on 10 April 1972 and deposited a certificate of ratification on 5 October 1977.

== Chemical weapons ==
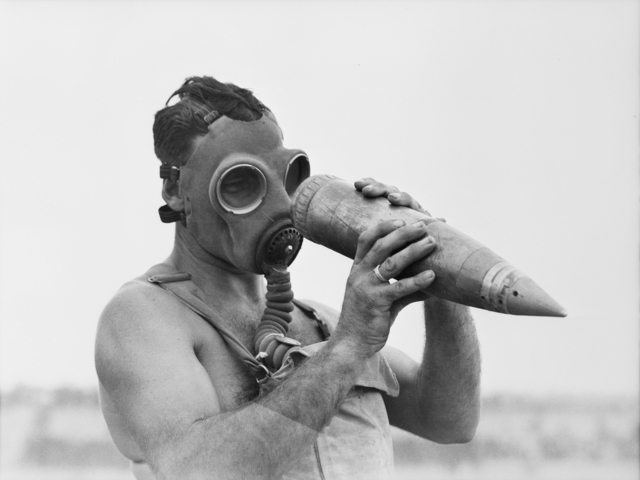
An observer examining an unexploded 25 pound gas shell following a trial of gas weapons at Singleton, New South Wales in 1943.

Australia conducted extensive research into chemical weapons during World War II. Although Australia has never produced chemical weapons, it did stockpile chemical weapons sourced from the United States and Britain. Chemical weapons known to have been stockpiled included mustard gas, phosgene, lewisite, adamsite and CN gas.

Some of the stockpiled weapons in the form of mortar and artillery shells, aerial bombs and bulk agents were sent to New Guinea for potential use against Japanese tunnel complexes. No actual use of the weapons was made although there were many trials using 'live' chemical weapons (such as shown in the adjacent picture).

After World War II, the chemical weapons were disposed of by burning, venting (for phosgene) or by dumping at sea. Some 21,030 tons of chemical weapons were dumped in the seas off Australia near Brisbane, Sydney and Melbourne. This has been covered in a Defence report by Geoff Plunkett. A complete history of Australia's involvement with chemical weapons – titled Chemical Warfare in Australia – has been published in book form by the Army History Unit (Defence Department) in 2013 (2nd Edn) Again it is authored by Geoff Plunkett .

A stockpile of 1,000 pound phosgene bombs was discovered at Embi Airfield, Papua in 1970 and disposed of by Australian Army personnel, and, up to 1990, drums of mustard gas were still being discovered in the bush where they had been tested. Another stockpile of chemical weapons was discovered at Maxwelton, Queensland in 1989. Australia signed the Chemical Weapons Convention in January 1993 and ratified it with the Chemical Weapons (Prohibition) Act in 1994.

== Nuclear weapons ==
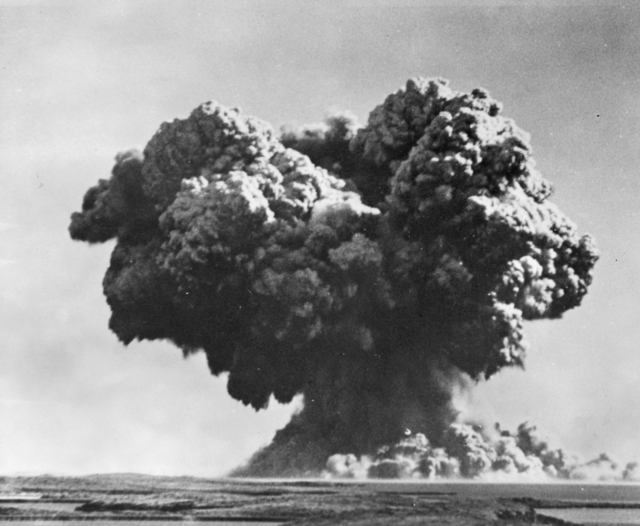
Operation Hurricane, a 25kt nuclear test, Monte Bello Islands, Australia

Australia does not currently have nuclear weapons and has never had its own nuclear weapons, although several federal governments have investigated the idea and conducted research into the question.

Australia investigated acquiring tactical nuclear weapons from the United Kingdom or the United States as early as 1956 when Athol Townley, Minister for Air, wrote to Philip McBride, Minister for Defence, recommending the acquisition of tactical nuclear weapons to arm Australia's English Electric Canberra bombers and CAC Sabre fighters.

Air Chief Marshal Frederick Scherger and Minister for Air Athol Townley supported acquiring nuclear weapons, both for international prestige and because of the small size of the country's military. While Scherger's British and American counterparts were encouraging, the Macmillan and Eisenhower governments were not. Prime Minister Robert Menzies' government decided that domestic production would be too difficult due to cost and international politics.

Australia hosted British nuclear testing in Monte Bello Islands (Operation Hurricane), Emu Field and Maralinga between 1952 and 1957. Maralinga was developed as a joint facility with a shared funding arrangement. During the 1950s, Australia participated in the development of the Blue Streak missile, a Medium-range ballistic missile (MRBM) intended for delivery of a nuclear warhead.

The Australian HIFAR nuclear reactor at Lucas Heights, Sydney, operated from 1958 to 2006 and has now been replaced by the OPAL reactor in 2006. The new reactor is designed to use low-enriched uranium fuel and an open pool light water system.

Australia has substantial deposits of uranium which account for 30% of the world's known reserves. In part due to its connection to nuclear weapons, uranium mining was heavily opposed in Australia during the 1970s and 1980s and protests against it have continued since. Until 1996 government policy restricted exploitation of uranium deposits to three established mines. A fourth site at Four Mile uranium mine was approved in July 2009. Current policy is to develop the export potential of Australia's uranium industry by allowing mining and export of uranium under strict international agreements designed to prevent nuclear proliferation.

Although the RAAF continued to occasionally investigate obtaining nuclear weapons during the 1960s, Australia signed the Nuclear Non-Proliferation Treaty on 27 February 1970 and ratified the treaty on 23 January 1973. Sir Philip Baxter first head of the Australian Atomic Energy Commission (AAEC), now the Australian Nuclear Science and Technology Organisation (ANSTO) and first Vice Chancellor of the University of New South Wales openly advocated Australia acquiring a weapons grade plutonium stockpile and thus nuclear weapons.

During the 1970s and 1980s, ANSTO scientists developed centrifuge enrichment technology, claimed to be comparable with the commercial URENCO centrifuge technology of the time. Such technology, if deployed on an industrial scale, would have been capable in principle of producing highly enriched uranium for nuclear weapons. The research lost government funding in the mid-1980s.

During the 1980s much attention was focused upon the connection of joint Australian-US military intelligence bases to nuclear weapons targeting. Various anti-nuclear protests have been held at the Pine Gap spy base, including one by 800 women in 1983 and a trespass action by five 'Peace Pilgrims' in 2016. Numerous rallies in Fremantle and other Australian cities were also held during the 1980s to oppose visits to Australian ports by potentially nuclear armed and powered US warships.

A commercial-scale enrichment plant would also be capable of producing sufficient highly enriched uranium for a nuclear weapons program. An Australian company has been actively developing a novel process for uranium enrichment, Separation of Isotopes by Laser Excitation (SILEX).

The Prime Minister of Australia, John Howard, began a study in 2006 into the issues surrounding an increase in Australia's uranium usage. Amongst the topics of the study were a domestic uranium enrichment plant for supplying low-enriched fuel for nuclear power reactors, either domestic or foreign.

In 2019, Hugh White, a military strategist, called for Australia to have nuclear weapons.

=== Delivery platforms ===
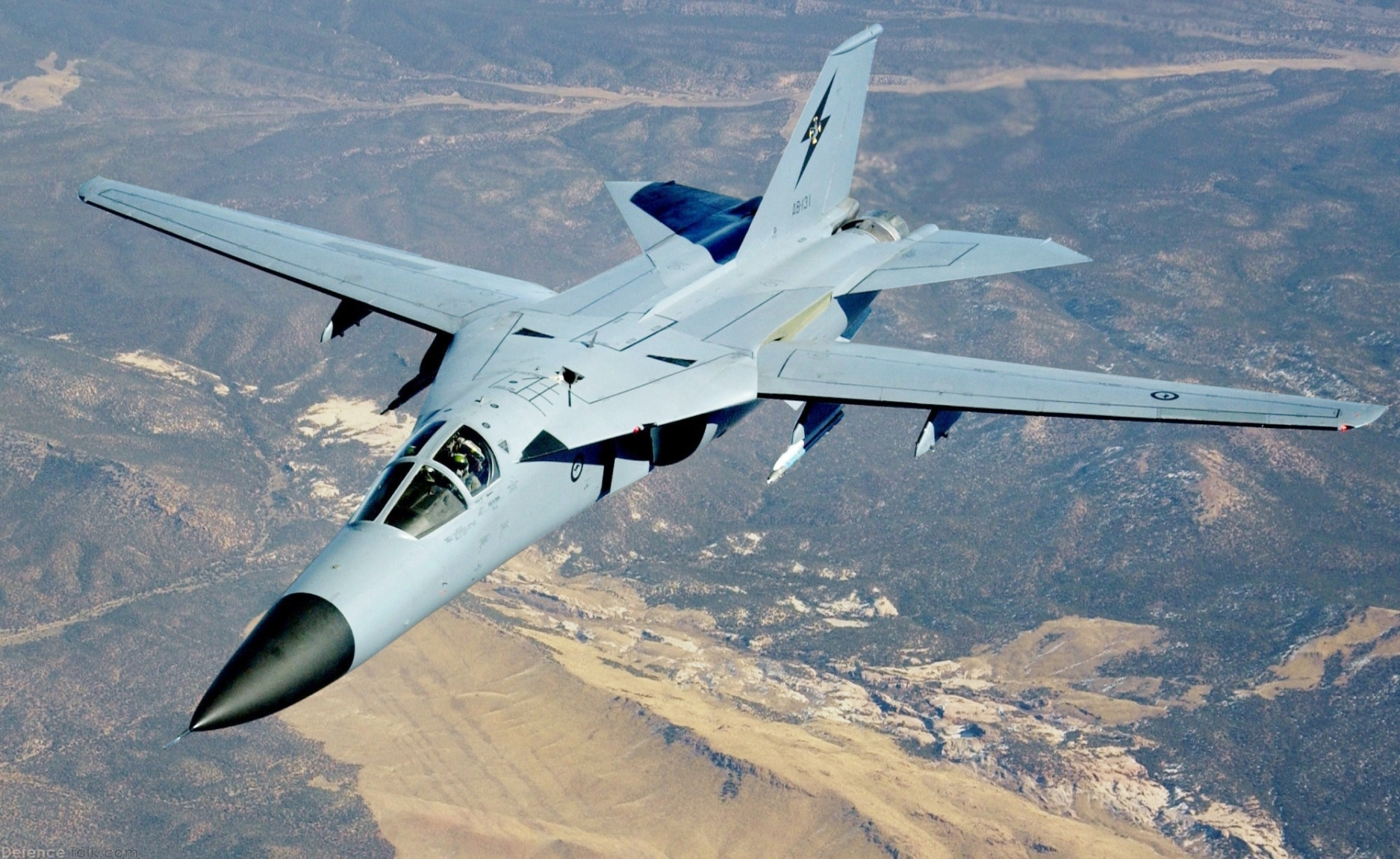
An Australian F-111

Like virtually every other developed nation and most larger developing nations, Australia has weapons systems which could be used to deliver nuclear weapons to its neighbours, if nuclear weapons were developed. The Royal Australian Air Force has 72 F-35A Lightning II strike fighters and 24 F/A-18F Super Hornet strike fighters.

Australia previously operated the Douglas A-4 Skyhawk ground-attack aircraft and the English Electric Canberra and General Dynamics F-111C bombers, which were theoretically capable of delivering nuclear weapons, and F-111G tactical bombers which converted from United States Air Force FB-111A strategic nuclear bombers. 75 F/A-18A/B Hornets were also operated until their retirement in 2021. Prior to the delivery of the F-111C, Australia briefly operated the McDonnell Douglas F-4E leased from the United States Air Force, standard Block 43/44 models capable of delivering nuclear weapons.

As part of Air Staff Requirement (Operational Requirement/Air) 36 for bomber aircraft in the 1950s, the Royal Australian Air Force specified a requirement for "an offensive tactical strike capability" and "strategic defence of Australia" with targets "as far north as the Kra Peninsula". The bomber was required to have a range of not less than 4,000 nautical miles (7,400 km) and be capable of carrying at least 20,000 pounds (9,100 kg) of conventional bombs or one BLUE DANUBE nuclear weapon (which had been air dropped at Maralinga on 11 October 1956). Locally manufactured versions of the Avro Vulcan or Handley Page Victor nuclear bombers were some of the options considered.

== Polling ==
In 2010 Lowy Institute poll asked If some of Australia’s near neighbours were to begin to develop nuclear weapons, would you then be personally in favour or against Australia also developing nuclear weapons?

It found that 16% were in favour (4% strongly in favour, 12% somewhat in favour) while 84% were against (63% strongly against, 21% somewhat against).

In 2022, the Lowy Institute performed another poll on Australians’ support for nuclear weapons. It found 11% strongly in favour and 25% somewhat in favour, for a total of 36% in favour (an increase from the 2010 poll), while 24% were somewhat against and 39% were strongly against acquiring nuclear weapons.

In 2026, a Lowy Institute Poll, found that 39% of Australians are in favour of acquiring nuclear weapons (11% strongly in favour and 28% somewhat in favour), while 58% are against (29% were somewhat against and 29% were strongly against acquiring nuclear weapons). Opposition has softened and support has increased.
