= Bragg (surname) =

- Language: England

Origin
- Origin: Normandy
- Meaning: the boastful person

Other names
- Variant forms: Frost, Ffrost, Ymffrostgar

Bragg is an English surname of Norman origin, the Welsh equivalent of this surname is Frost or Ffrost deriving from Ymffrostgar and may refer to:

People:

== A ==
- Alvin Bragg (born 1973), American politician, current New York County District Attorney
- Andrew Bragg (born 1984), Australian senator
- Art Bragg (1930–2018), American sprinter

== B ==
- Bernard Bragg (1928–2018), deaf actor, writer, director, poet and artist
- Billy Bragg (born 1957), English folk musician
- Braxton Bragg (1817–1876), Confederate Civil War general for whom Fort Bragg was originally named
- Braxton Bragg (baseball) (born 2000), American baseball player

== C ==
- Caleb Bragg (1885–1943), American racecar driver, speedboat racer, aviation pioneer and automotive inventor
- Charles Bragg, (1930–2017), American artist
- Craig Bragg (born 1982), American football wide receiver

== D ==
- Darren Bragg (born 1969), former Major League Baseball outfielder
- Don Bragg (1935–2019), American pole vaulter and Olympic gold medalist
- Don Bragg (basketball) (1933–1985), American basketball player

== E ==
- Edward S. Bragg (1827–1912), American politician, lawyer and Union Army general from Wisconsin

== J ==
- Jacob Bragg (born 2000), Australian long-distance runner
- Janet Bragg (1907–1993), aviator and first African-American woman to hold a commercial pilot license
- Jesse Bragg (1887–after 1918), Negro league baseball player
- John Bragg (disambiguation), various people

== K ==
- Ken Bragg (born 1950), member of the Arkansas House of Representatives

== L ==
- Laura Bragg (1881–1978), American museum director
- Lawrence Bragg (1890–1971), physicist and recipient of the in 1915 Nobel Prize in Physics, together with his father William H Bragg

== M ==
- Marie-Elsa Bragg (born 1964 or 1965), English priest and writer
- Melvyn Bragg (born 1939), English broadcaster and author
- Mike Bragg (born 1946), former National Football League punter

== P ==
- Patricia Bragg (1929–2023), American author and businesswoman
- Paul Bragg (1895–1976), nutritionist
- Philip Bragg (died 1759), Irish lieutenant-general and Member of Parliament

== R ==
- Rick Bragg (born 1959), Pulitzer Prize-winning American author and journalist
- Robert Henry Bragg Jr. (1919–2017), physicist
- Roland L. Bragg (1923–1999), American paratrooper for whom Fort Bragg was renamed in 2025

== S ==
- Stephen Bragg (1923–2014), engineer

== T ==
- Thomas Bragg (1810–1872), North Carolina politician and lawyer

== W ==
- William Henry Bragg (1862–1942), physicist and recipient of the 1915 Nobel Prize in Physics, together with his son Lawrence Bragg

== Fictional characters ==
- Randy Bragg, protagonist of the novel Alas, Babylon

== See also ==
- Bragge (surname)
