= Jervis Bay Nuclear Power Plant =

Proposed nuclear power plant in Australia

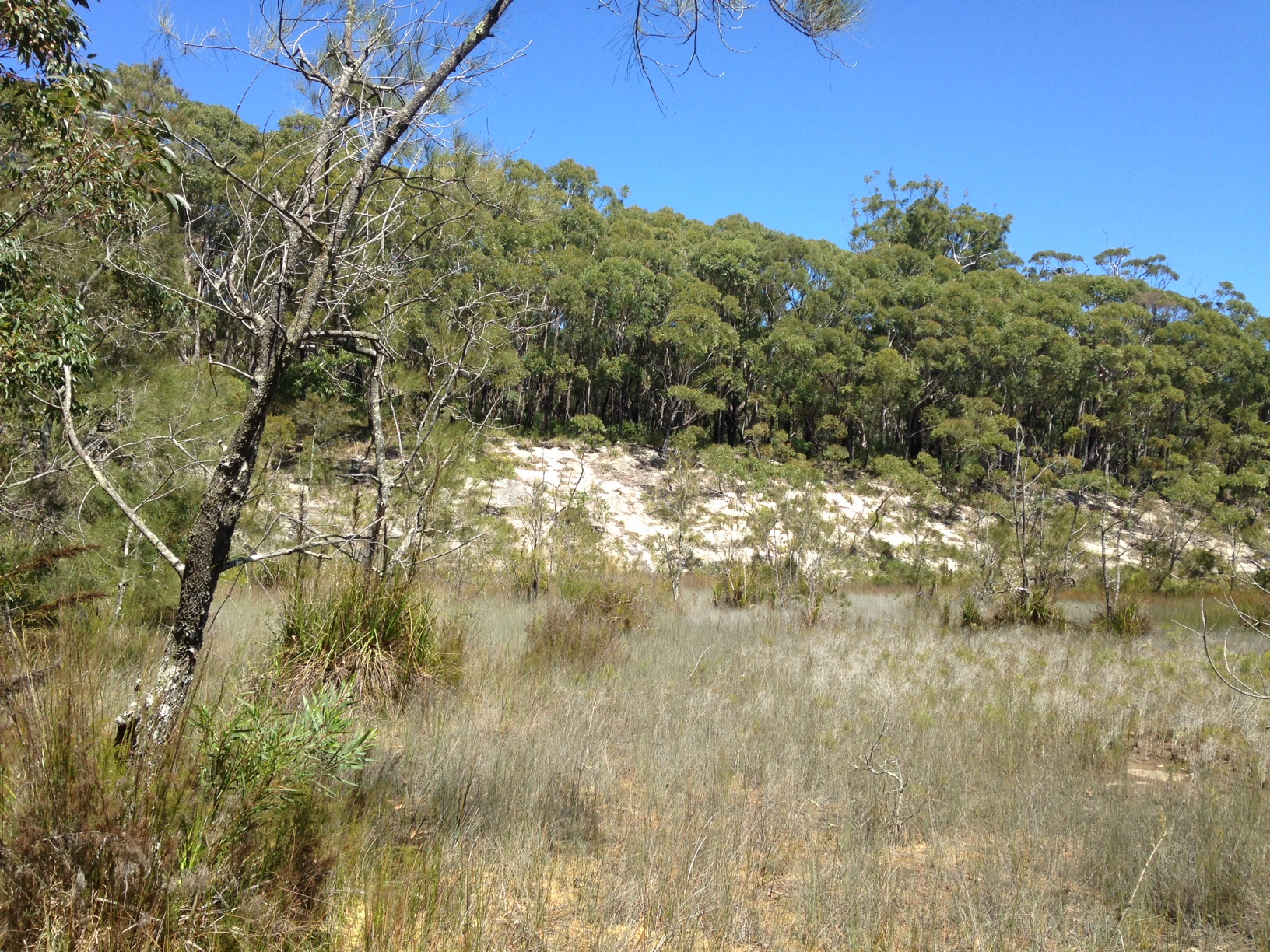
- East end of the proposed site of the Jervis Bay Nuclear Power Plant, 2014
- Country: Australia
- Location: Jervis Bay Territory
- Coordinates: 35°07′34″S 150°45′11″E
- Status: Cancelled
- Decommission date: 1971
- Owner: Australian Government
- Operator: Australian Atomic Energy Commission

Nuclear power station
- Reactor type: Steam-Generating Heavy Water Reactor (SGHWR)
- Reactor supplier: The Nuclear Power Group Ltd. (TNPG)
- Cooling source: Jervis Bay, South Pacific Ocean

Power generation
- Units cancelled: 1 x 600 MWe

The Jervis Bay Nuclear Power Plant was a proposed nuclear power reactor in the Jervis Bay Territory, an Australian federal territory adjoining the South Coast of the state of New South Wales. It would have been Australia's first nuclear power station, and is the only proposal to have reached the design and construction stages as of 2026. Environmental studies and early site works were completed, and two rounds of tenders were called and evaluated, but the Australian Government ultimately decided not to proceed with the project. This was due to the perceived cost, and to the discovery of new coal and hydrocarbon resources that were regarded as more economically attractive.

== Background to the project ==
In 1969, the Australian government proposed to the New South Wales government that a 500 MWe nuclear power station should be built on Commonwealth territory and connected to the New South Wales grid, with electricity generation and distribution being a state responsibility under the Australian constitution. Possible sites were the Australian Capital Territory and Jervis Bay. The plan, supported by the Australian Atomic Energy Commission, was for a reactor design that could generate weapons-grade plutonium, possibly reflecting Australia's long-term post-World War II interest in acquiring nuclear weapons.

In December 1969, invitations to express interest in the construction of a nuclear power plant at Jervis Bay were sent to fourteen organisations. Tender documents were issued in February 1970, with tenders closing in June. Fourteen tenders were received, from seven different organisations. About 70 staff were involved full-time in evaluating tenders, principally from the Australian Atomic Energy Commission and the Electricity Commission of New South Wales. More than 150 other staff had a significant part-time role. As a result, a recommendation was written for the acceptance of a tender to supply a 600 MWe Steam generating heavy water reactor (SGHWR), from the British organisation, The Nuclear Power Group.

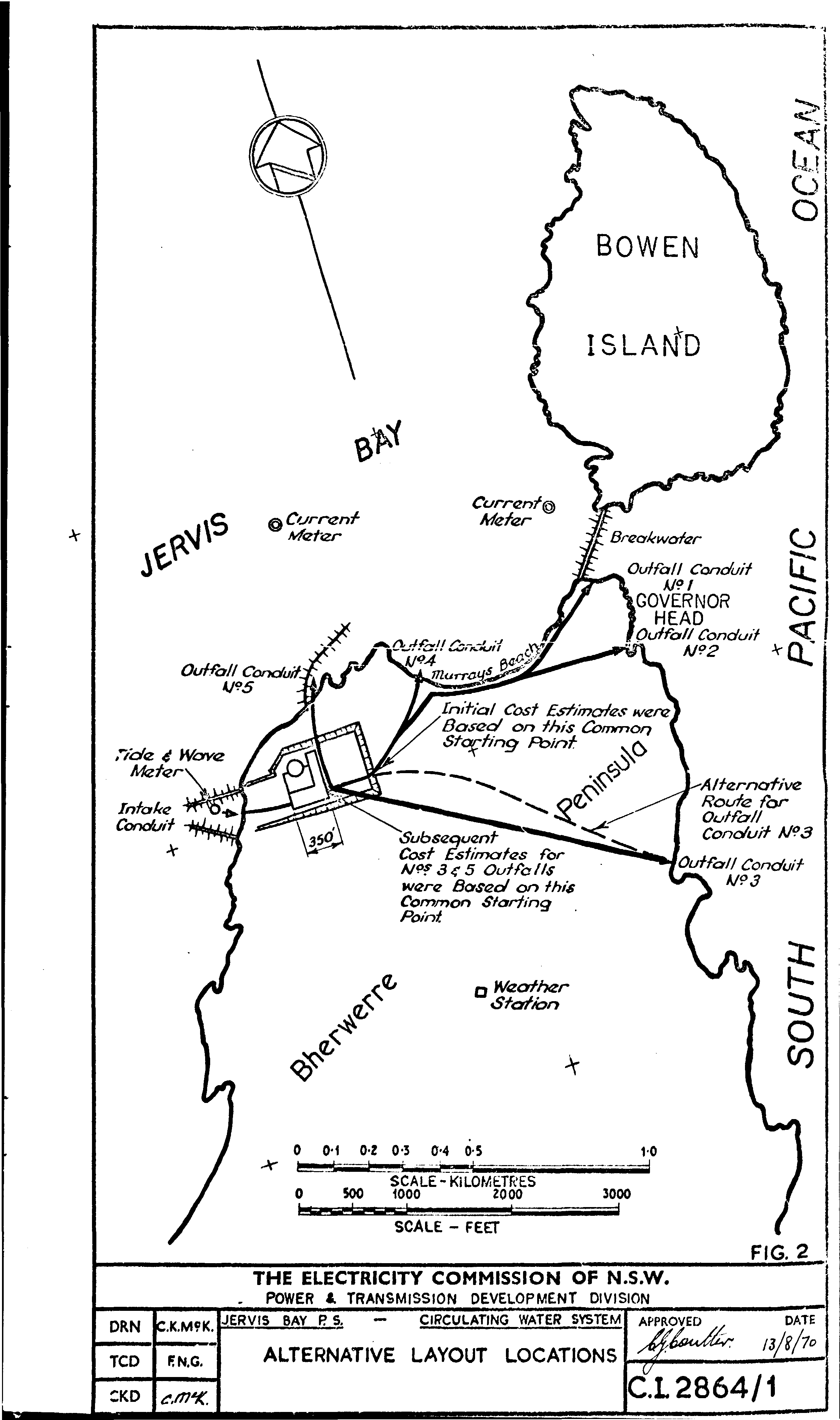
Proposed site layout for a 500 MW reactor at Murrays Beach (c.1970)

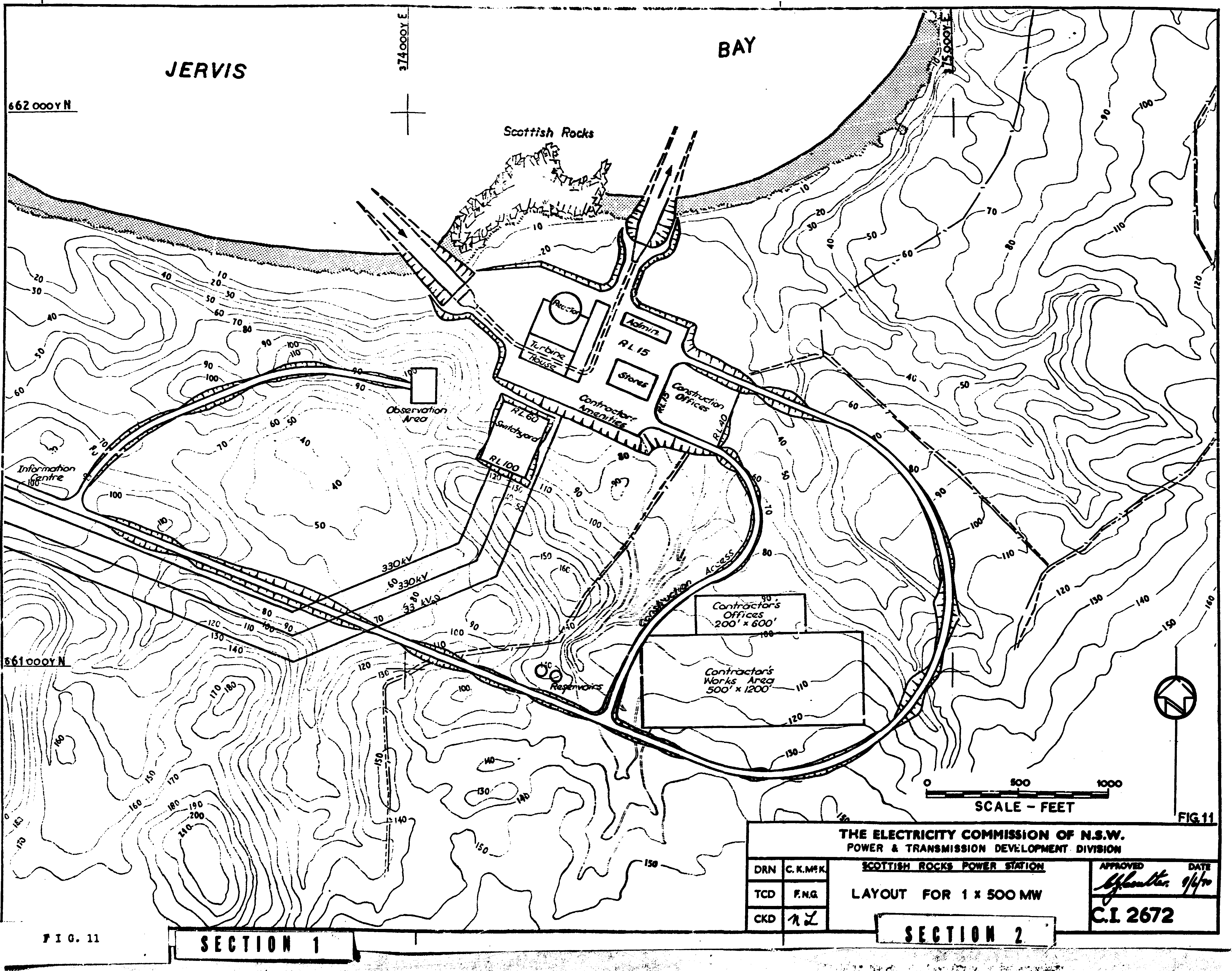
Proposed site layout for a 500 MW reactor at Scottish Rocks (c.1970)

== The abandonment of the proposal ==
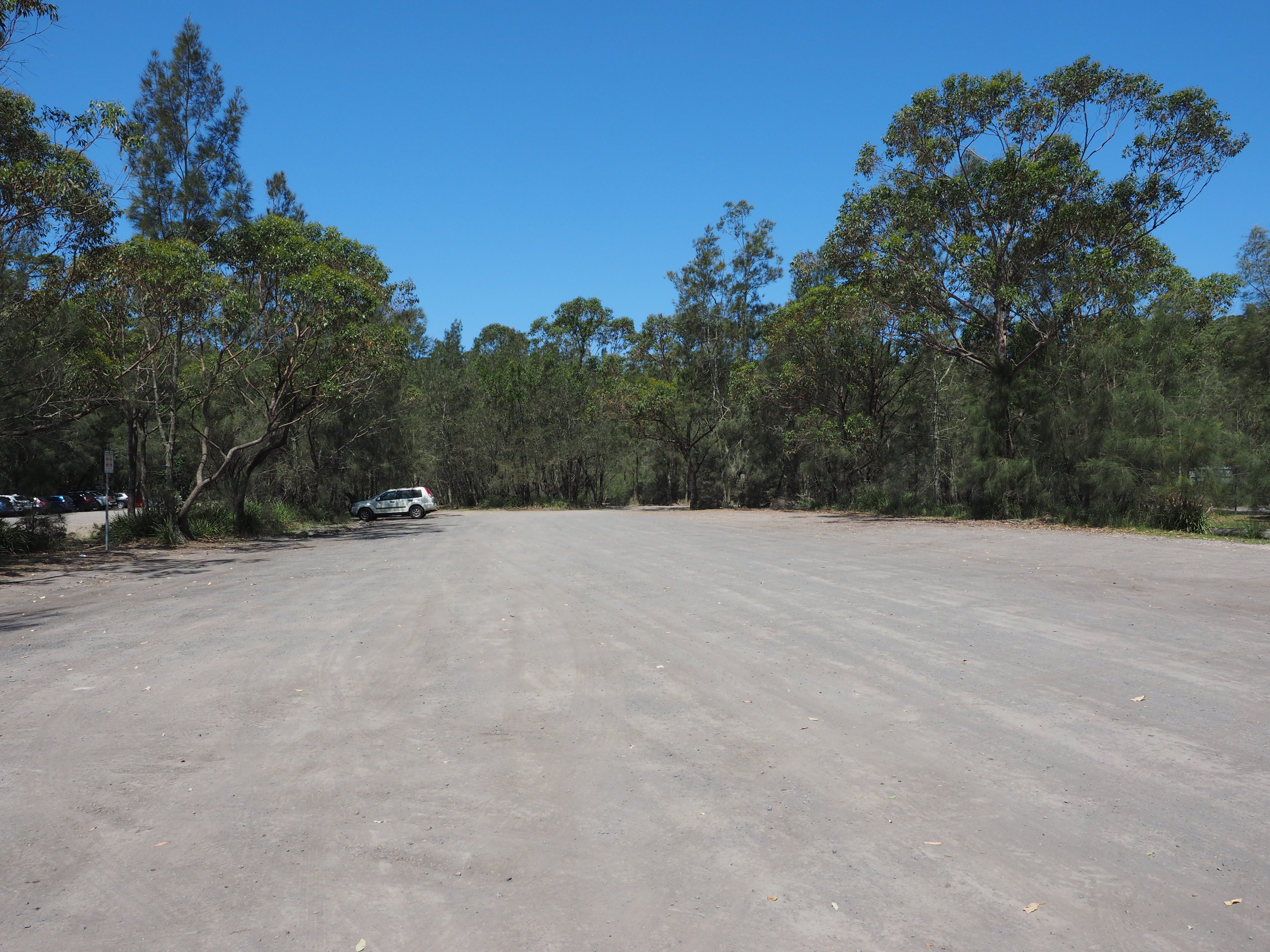
Part of the Murrays Beach car park in 2020. The car park occupies part of the site cleared for the nuclear power station.

Before this recommendation was made, there was a change of prime minister, although not of government. John Gorton had been a supporter of the project. In March 1971, Gorton was replaced as prime minister by William McMahon. McMahon opposed the nuclear power program, and the project was deferred for a year, citing financial constraints – Treasury prepared the first comprehensive comparative cost analysis in 1971 and concluded that nuclear was going to be far more expensive than a conventional coal plant.

Following the discovery of natural gas and oil in Bass Strait, and the development of economic coal resources, most of the energy security incentive had evaporated. Tenders were re-called, only to be again deferred and in practical terms cancelled in June 1971. Organisations like the World Union for Protection of Life, the Ecology Action and the Society for Responsibility in Science had reported about the dangers connected with the nuclear power plant.

Some land clearing was done in preparation for the construction, and concrete footings were installed. The footings are visible to this day.

== See also ==
- High Flux Australian Reactor – Australia's first nuclear reactor
- Nuclear power in Australia
- Open-pool Australian lightwater reactor – Australia's only operational nuclear reactor
