= Cliffbrook =

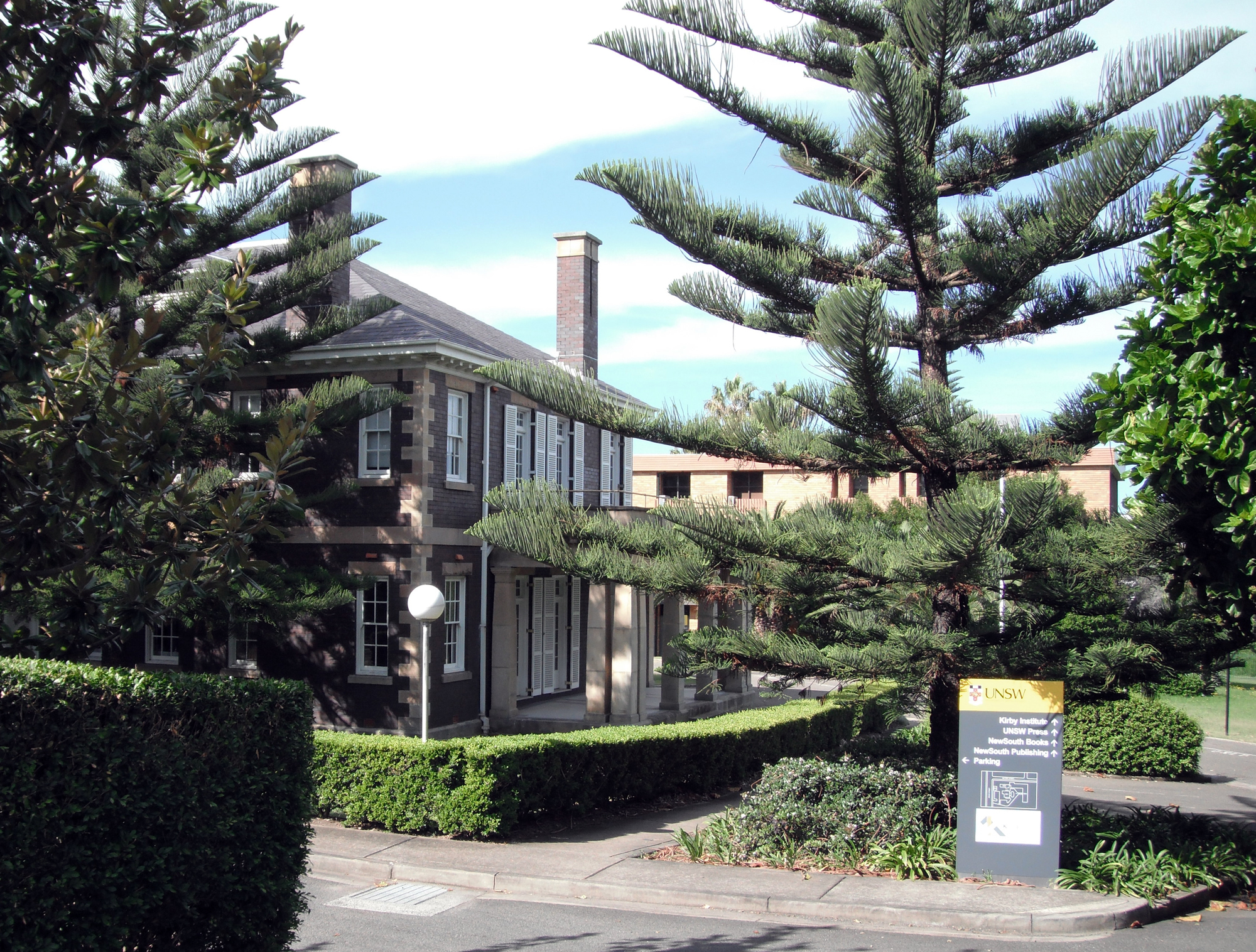
- Cliffbrook House, pictured in March 2013.

- Location within Sydney Location within Australia
- 33°54′50″S 151°15′37″E
- Location: 45–51 Beach Street, Coogee, City of Randwick, New South Wales, Australia

History
- Built: 1921

Site notes
- Architect: John Kirkpatrick (attributed)
- Architectural styles: Victorian Italianate; Federation Free Classical; Inter Wars Free Classical
- Owner: University of New South Wales

New South Wales Heritage Register
- Official name: Cliffbrook
- Type: State heritage (built)
- Designated: 2 April 1999
- Reference no.: 609
- Type: Mansion
- Category: Residential buildings (private)

Cliffbrook is a heritage-listed former residence, school and government building and now university research, administration building and university press located at 45–51 Beach Street, Coogee, New South Wales, an eastern suburb of Sydney, Australia. Built in 1921, its design is attributed to John Kirkpatrick. The building is owned by the University of New South Wales. The property was added to the New South Wales State Heritage Register on 2 April 1999.

== History ==
=== Indigenous history ===
pre-1780s – local Aboriginal people in the area used the site for fishing and cultural activities – rock engravings, grinding grooves and middens remain in evidence. 1789 – Governor Philip referred to "a long bay", which became known as Long Bay. Aboriginal people are believed to have inhabited the Sydney region for at least 20,000 years. The population of Aboriginal people between Palm Beach and Botany Bay in 1788 has been estimated to have been 1500. Those living south of Port Jackson to Botany Bay were the Cadigal people who spoke Dharug, while the local clan name of Maroubra people was "Muru-ora-dial". By the mid nineteenth century the traditional owners of this land had typically either moved inland in search of food and shelter, or had died as the result of European disease or confrontation with British colonisers.

=== Colonial history ===
One of the earliest land grants in this area was made in 1824 to Captain Francis Marsh, who received 12 acres bounded by the present Botany and High Streets, Alison and Belmore Roads. In 1839 William Newcombe acquired the land north-west of the present town hall in Avoca Street.

Randwick takes its name from the town of Randwick, Gloucestershire, England. The name was suggested by Simeon Pearce (1821–86) and his brother James. Simeon was born in the English Randwick and the brothers were responsible for the early development of both Randwick and its neighbour, Coogee. Simeon had come to the colony in 1841 as a 21 year old surveyor. He built his Blenheim House on the 4 acres he bought from Marsh, and called his property "Randwick". The brothers bought and sold land profitably in the area and elsewhere. Simeon campaigned for construction of a road from the city to Coogee (achieved in 1853) and promoted the incorporation of the suburb. Pearce sought construction of a church modelled on the church of St. John in his birthplace. In 1857 the first St Jude's stood on the site of the present post office, at the corner of the present Alison Road and Avoca Street.

Randwick was slow to progress. The village was isolated from Sydney by swamps and sandhills, and although a horse-drawn omnibus was operated by a man named Grice from the late 1850s, the journey was more a test of nerves than a pleasure jaunt. Wind blew sand over the track, and the bus sometimes became bogged, so that passengers had to get out and push it free. From its early days Randwick had a divided society. The wealthy lived elegantly in large houses built when Pearce promoted Randwick and Coogee as a fashionable area. But the market gardens, orchards and piggeries that continued alongside the large estates were the lot of the working class. Even on the later estates that became racing empires, many jockeys and stablehands lived in huts or even under canvas. An even poorer group were the immigrants who existed on the periphery of Randwick in a place called Irishtown, in the area now known as The Spot, around the junction of St.Paul's Street and Perouse Road. Here families lived in makeshift houses, taking on the most menial tasks in their struggle to survive.

In 1858 when the NSW Government passed the Municipalities Act, enabling formation of municipal districts empowered to collect rates and borrow money to improve their suburb, Randwick was the first suburb to apply for the status of a municipality. It was approved in February 1859, and its first Council was elected in March 1859.

Randwick had been the venue for sporting events, as well as duels and illegal sports, from the early days in the colony's history. Its first racecourse, the Sandy Racecourse or Old Sand Track, had been a hazardous track over hills and gullies since 1860. When a move was made in 1863 by John Tait, to establish Randwick Racecourse, Simeon Pearce was furious, especially when he heard that Tait also intended to move into Byron Lodge. Tait's venture prospered, however and he became the first person in Australia to organise racing as a commercial sport. The racecourse made a big difference to the progress of Randwick. The horse-drawn omnibus gave way to trams that linked the suburb to Sydney and civilisation. Randwick soon became a prosperous and lively place, and it still retains a busy residential, professional and commercial life.

Today, some of the houses have been replaced by home units. Many European migrants have made their homes in the area, along with students and workers at the nearby University of NSW and the Prince of Wales Hospital.

=== Cliffbrook ===
The existing property Cliffbrook presently stands on part of an original estate named "Cliff-Brook" which comprised three parcels of crown land granted between 1845–1846 to Lewis Gordon, a State Government Surveyor.

The original land grant was for four acres 1 rood and was followed a year later by two further parcels, one 1 acre 3 roods 30 perches. The Cliffbrook estate today stands on part of the latter parcel. Extensive changes to the boundaries' of the estate have occurred through time.

Lewis Gordon apparently erected a house on the estate, however, no record of it can be found today. Between 1846 and 1856 the estate was sold in full to M. H. Lewis and subsequently to O. M. Lewis.

It was sold again in 1859 to Australian footballer, John Thompson. By this time, the "Cliff-Brook" estate included a further parcel of land. The grounds were "over 5.7 hectares (14 acres) then, and included the sheltered bay" – Gordon's Bay. John Thompson was a local businessman who became Mayor of Randwick in 1873. Thompson is believed to have built the original Cliff-Brook mansion in the 1860s.

Designed in the Victorian Italianate style: "the main walls of the house were solid stone quarried from the site. the balustrades to the verandahs and parapet walls were brickwork rendered in cement. The whole of the external walls and cement mouldings were given a lime and cement wash to give the building a uniform colour. The large verandah on the upper floor was laid in Italian mosaic imported from Rome, the main entrance hall floor was tiled. There was a stone lodge at the main entrance gates. large stone stables with four horse stalls. coach house, harness room and man's quarters."

The stone buildings were located on the northern end of the estate where the current mansion stands. The property was again sold in 1889 to George Hill. The later additions to the mansion, including the towers are believed to have been carried out by George Hill.

Hill was "a squatter and a horse-player and we may never know which sent him broke" but in 1899 he was declared bankrupt and the property was repossessed by the Bank of New South Wales in payment of debts owing to the Bank. The Bank employed a caretaker to look after the house and grounds which were apparently used as a poultry farm. After spending "some (Pounds)600 clearing up the house and garden, the caretaker was finally dismissed.

In 1905 Sir Denison Miller, then assistant to the general Manager of the Bank of New South Wales, was asked to occupy the mansion, rent free. Six years later, Miller now first Governor of the Commonwealth Bank, purchased the estate. "He paid A£8,000 for the land and house and later sold the foreshores of Thompson's Bay" to Randwick Municipal Council for A£3,000. The present Cliffbrook mansion was built in 1921, according to the Randwick Historical Society's documentation, designed by architect John Kirkpatrick in the Federation Free Classical style. The original stone buildings were demolished to accommodate the residence.

Kirkpatrick had established himself as a prominent architect in Sydney by the late 1880s. He was the architect for several important surviving buildings in the City including the Colonial Mutual Life Building, Martin Place (1894) the Commonwealth Bank, Pitt Street (1914). Although Thomas Rowe won the competition for the Sydney Hospital Buildings on Macquarie Street, Kirkpatrick was commissioned by the government to finish the project. The design of the operating Theatre and Chapel at the rear is attributed to Kirkpatrick. He was also architect for grandstands at the Sydney Cricket Ground.

The authorship of the design remains unresolved. The lack of primary source references in secondary sources consulted suggests that a resolution of this question will require much more research. Uncorroborated oral evidence provided in an inquiry to the Australian Heritage Commission suggested a strong friendship between Sir Denison Miller and Kirkpatrick, perhaps connected with Mlller's Governorship of the Commonwealth Bank from 1911 and Kirkpatrick's commission for the Pitt Street Bank Building completed in 1914.

Peter McCallum, who is currently a Principal of E. A. and T. M. Scott, has advised that he recalls the firm's archives were destroyed in 1958. E. A. Scott established his practice in 1888: after World War I the firm was E. A. Scott, Green and Scott: and after 1949 the name E. A. and T. M. Scott was adopted. McCallum is not able to connect Cliffbrook with the firm but did note that E. A. Scott designed many houses in Lang Road, Centennial Park, often recognised because of his use of "plum-coloured" bricks.

The present evidence is circumstantial. Cliffbrook may have been designed by Kirkpatrick, or E. A. Scott, or (a third possibility) by Kirkpatrick in association with E. A. Scott. This theory is based on the presumption that Kirkpatrick, late in his career, may have undertaken part of the commission and sought assistance from a younger architect - or may have, for reasons as yet unknown, been unable to complete the commission which was then taken over by E. A. Scott

The new house took on the name Cliffbrook and the earlier residence was subsequently known as "Gordon Court".

Miller died in 1923 and the property was sold to Welki King before finally being sold to the Australian Government. During the Second World War the estate was occupied by the army to serve as a school of tropical medicine. After 1945, "Gordon Court" and part of the estate was auctioned and sold to Friedrich Schiller, a Hungarian, electrician who lived in, the mansion with his sister. "Gordon Court" was eventually sold in 1977 and promptly demolished to make way for housing development. The site as it stands today was purchased by the Commonwealth and housed the headquarters of the Australian Atomic Energy Commission (AAEC) from 1953 to 1981 (later renamed the Australian Nuclear Science and Technology Organisation) (ANSTO). The property purchase by the AAEC was not finalised until 1959, for the sum of $13,518.42.

The period between 1953 and 1981 saw the most far reaching changes to the site. Three substantial buildings were added to the site. A single-storey brick residence. a single-storey brick office building. and a two- to three-storey brick office building. Along with these were lesser buildings including two fibro buildings (which may date from the army's occupancy) and a small greenhouse. The exact dates of construction of three brick buildings are not known. Max Dupain's photographs of the site dated 1965 show that both the L-shaped brick office building and the single-storey brick office building existed at this time and presumably too the residence. The photographs also show that in 1965 the present two- to three-storey L-shaped building comprised a single storey on its northern wing and three storeys on the eastern wing. This photograph also shows a mature Norfolk Island pine in the space between Cliffbrook and the three-storey wing. It appears from ANSTO records that the single-storey northern wing of the L-shaped building existed prior to 1958 when architects Budden Nangle and Michael designed the three-storey eastern wing. The caretakers cottage was also designed in 1958. The Green house was erected in March 1959.

The eastern wing although containing the equivalent number of storeys as today has been altered on its western and southern faces. The northern wing has had a further level added to it and has also had its facade significantly altered since 1965.

The alterations to the L-shaped building were carried out after 1969. The architects Edwards. Madigan. Torzillo and Partners. were employed to design and document the alterations and additions to this building. The contract documents prepared for this work are dated July 1969 and from this we can assume that the additions were carried out soon after 1969. The most substantial alterations to Cliffbrook were in 1963–64. Plans by Budden Nangle and Michael dated 19 September 1963 show how the original kitchen G 12/G 13 was opened up by removal of the south wall, installation of a new lower ceiling and construction of the existing inquiry counter where a former hall closet existed. The kitchen stove recess had new shelves and doors fitted and the south door and partition wall in G 13 was constructed at this time. A drawing dated 15 May 1964 shows removal of the north wall of the main upstairs bathroom and construction of a new W.C. compartment, new dog-leg stud partition wall (between U7 and U8) and a built in wardrobe. The alterations to the en-suite bathroom and re-opening of the door between U2 and U3 are also shown in the drawing. In 1981 the Australian Atomic Energy Commission now known as the Australian Nuclear Science and Technology Organisation (ANSTO) moved their headquarters to Lucas Heights in 1981.

During 1988 the Commonwealth Government sought to dispose of the property. As an item of State significance a Permanent Conservation Order was placed over the property on 28 October 1988 to ensure the future conservation and management of the property. In 1993 ownership of the property was transferred to the University of New South Wales for research and administrative purposes. It was transferred to the State Heritage Register on 2 April 1999.

== Description ==
=== Site and garden ===
Cliffbrook stands in a large suburban lot, with an established garden. Lawns abut the main house, with sealed drive sweeping up to its portico / porte cochere. Three Norfolk Island pines (Araucaria heterophylla) mark the front yard and view in from Beach Street. A number of palm species are also in the garden. A large Moreton Bay fig (Ficus macrophylla) is towards the rear on the southern side boundary.

=== Stone boundary walls ===
The boundary wall was built in two stages. The western boundary wall is constructed in roughly squared and coursed sandstone with a soft lime mortar containing uncalcified lenses of lime. Successive attempts to repoint eroding mortar in a hard cement rich mix have detracted from its appearance and contributed little to its structural condition. The main entry gates in the western boundary wall are of no significance, however the gate opening is in the same location as the original main gates shown in the 1893 survey. The northern boundary wall's stonework is also irregularly coursed but individual stones are more precisely squared and generally larger in size. A wall is shown in this location in a detail survey by T. B. U. Sloman. 25 September 1893 and encloses the stable yard. A photograph in 1883 shows Cliffbrook and the west boundary wall and a large gap extending east from the north east corner to a paling fence.

The mortar is a very hard white cement rich mix – harder than the stone itself. Attempts to patch erosion in darker grey hard cement mortar appear to address the erosion of stone around the cement mortar joints not deterioration of the mortar itself. The mortar patching which is excessive and unsightly has done little to improve the condition of the wall. There are stone buttresses to both walls. Most of the buttresses to the northern wall are bonded in and are of the same period of construction. The buttresses to the west wall appear to be of two periods of construction: neither type is bonded into the older wall: both are laid in hard cement mortar: the northernmost rectangular form buttress appears to be of the same construction as the buttresses in the north wall.

All but the northernmost buttress in the western boundary wall are shown in the 1893 Survey plan. No buttresses are shown at the north walls at this time. The date of the western boundary wall is not indicated clearly by documentary evidence available at present, although its construction, and particularly the mortar type is consistent with the technology of the original Cliffbrook mansion built in the 1860s. It is unlikely to be later than 1870s when cement was more readily available for mortar mixes and concrete. It is seen in an 1883 photograph. However documentary evidence of Sloman's Survey Plan of 1893 and the 1883 photograph show that the north wall and buttresses to the west wall certainly precede the construction of the 1920s Cliffbrook.

=== The garage ===
The garage is an unimposing structure constructed from recycled sandstone in a hard cement mortar. Its walls are not bonded into the older west wall. Again, documentary evidence has not revealed the precise time of construction. It might be expected that, if it was constructed at the same time as Cliffbrook, it would show some similarity in style and materials. It does not. In the 1920s garages were still a relatively new and uncommon building type owing more to the tradition of stables. Following this tradition garages of this period were usually designed as secondary utilitarian structures which did not attempt to compete with the architecture of the primary residential building on the site. This garage conforms to the usual pattern, although there is no evidence to prove exactly when it was built. It can be confidently concluded that the garage structure dates from some time in the 1920s or early 1930s. The clues to this "time band" for its construction can be seen in the detailing of the northern windows and architraves and the underlying layer of kalsomine paint on the internal faces of the sandstone walls.

Otherwise the building has no features of architectural, aesthetic or technical distinction. It has been modified many times in an ad hoc manner:

- the skillion roof construction is of no particular technical interest and
- the asbestos cement and caneite ceiling panels are in poor condition
- the southern louvre window is a later replacement of an earlier window leaving the original architraves.
- the internal single skin brick walls detract from the spatial quality and appearance of the interior.
- the roller shutter door is a recently added standard item.
- the former southern garage door has been infilled by a timber vertical board wall and door, now in very poor condition.

The petrol pump standing by the south east corner is of early vintage but apparently is now non-functional.

=== House ===
Cliffbrook is a two-storey liver brick building with sandstone detailing. It is designed in the Inter Wars Free Classical style. Its overall form and stylistic elements employed in the external design have antecedents in the Victorian Italianate style, although the liver brick work, the simple stone detailing, the terrazo floors and interior joinery are distinctly of the 1920s. The construction of the house consists of a slate roof, copper gutters and downpipes, bracketed eaves, liver brick walls with sandstone quoins, sandstone window and door heads and sandstone sills, sandstone porticos and terraces in the north, east and west elevations and white painted timber double hung windows, front doors and French doors to the upper level terraces.

The interiors are relatively plain, having moulded plaster ceilings of Regency style with deep coved cornices only to the main living and reception rooms. The original door and window joinery is largely intact - these elements, like the deep timber skirting which survives in most rooms were dark stained maple. In some rooms original timber finishes have been covered by white paint.

== Heritage listing ==
As at 9 September 2011, Cliffbrook is of State heritage significance for its association with the larger original Estate "Cliff-brook" of John Thompson, Mayor of Randwick in 1873, being the largest surviving area of land of that estate, following successive subdivisions and sales. It is significant through its association with the first owner Sir Denison Miller who was the first Governor of the Commonwealth Bank. The house may be found to be a late work of John Kirkpatrick a prominent architect in Sydney from the 1880s responsible for major commissions such as the Colonial Mutual Life Building, Grandstands at the Sydney Cricket Ground and the Commonwealth Bank Pitt Street Sydney. It may also be established that E. A. Scott was involved in the building's creation. The firm established by E. A. Scott in 1888 still practices today in the name of E. A. and T. M. Scott. The house of a high standard of architectural design. It is well proportioned, has an impressive scale and appearance befitting Sir Denison Miller's prestige and position in public life. The design in the Inter Wars Free Classical style contains anomalous applications of the Italianate style rare in the 1920s. It is the more significant for its rarity being such a late example containing elements of the Italianate style. The building displays high standards of craftsmanship in the brickwork and joinery particularly, as excellent examples of the techniques employed and use of the materials in the 1920s.

Cliffbrook was listed on the New South Wales State Heritage Register on 2 April 1999 having satisfied the following criteria.

The place is important in demonstrating the course, or pattern, of cultural or natural history in New South Wales.

Cliffbrook has associations with significant historical figures. The first owner was Sir Denison Miller, the first governor of the Commonwealth Bank. Cliffbrook may also be found to be the work of John Kirkpatrick, a prominent 1880s Sydney architect responsible for major commissions such as the Colonial Mutual Life Building, grandstands at the Sydney Cricket Ground and the Commonwealth bank, Pitt Street. E.A.Scott may also have been involved in the building's creation.

The place is important in demonstrating aesthetic characteristics and/or a high degree of creative or technical achievement in New South Wales.

The house of a high standard of architectural design. It is well proportioned, has an impressive scale and appearance befitting Sir Denison Miller's prestige and position in public life. The design in the Inter Wars Free Classical style contains anomalous applications of the Italianate style rare in the 1920s. It is the more significant for its rarity being such a late example containing elements of the Italianate style.

The place has potential to yield information that will contribute to an understanding of the cultural or natural history of New South Wales.

The building displays high standards of craftsmanship in the brickwork and joinery particularly, as excellent examples of the techniques employed and use of the materials in the 1920s.

Despite its conservative architectural style, the building contains examples of contemporary construction techniques and use of materials in the use of reinforced concrete structures, the use of terrazzo floor finishes and the use of dark "liver" bricks.

== See also ==
- Australian residential architectural styles
