= Bragg Institute =

Neutron and X-ray scattering group in Australia

The Australian Centre for Neutron Scattering (ACNS), formerly the Bragg Institute, is a landmark neutron and X-ray scattering facility in Australia. It is located at the Australian Nuclear Science and Technology Organisation's (ANSTO) Lucas Heights site, 40 km south-west of Sydney, in New South Wales, Australia.

The Institute was formed in December 2002 in preparation for the start-up of the Open-pool Australian lightwater reactor in 2006, and named as a tribute to the father-and-son team Sir William Henry Bragg and son William Lawrence Bragg, who were jointly awarded the Nobel Prize for Physics in 1915 for pioneering the analysis of crystal structures by means of X-rays. Following a restructure of scientific operations in 2016, the Institute was split to form two distinct research platforms, ACNS and the National Deuteration Facility.

ACNS operates the cold- and thermal-neutron scattering facility associated with the OPAL research reactor, including 14 operational neutron beam instruments, and one instrument in transfer from the BER-II Research Reactor at the Helmholtz-Zentrum Berlin. It houses a helium-3 polarisation system to enable polarised-neutron experiments, two small-angle X-ray scattering instruments, an X-ray reflectometer and Physical Properties Measurement System.

Neutron scattering covers an extremely wide range of disciplines from fundamental physics, through chemistry, materials, and biology, right through to interdisciplinary areas such as engineering and archaeology. Science at the Australian Centre for Neutron Scattering covers many of these areas, usually in collaboration with other groups, with a focus on the application of neutron scattering to crystallography, soft condensed matter, solid-state physics, physical chemistry and increasingly biology. The ACNS identifies 6 key scientific projects: The Food Science Project, Thermo-Mechanical Processes, Energy Materials, Magnetism, Cultural Heritage and Planetary Materials.

From its inception until 2016, the Institute was led by Robert Robinson. In 2016 Jamie Schulz became leader of the ACNS. ACNS currently employs approximately 100 staff.

Access to the neutron instrumentation at the ACNS is available to all qualified applications through either proprietary fee-for-service research, non-proprietary peer reviewed merit access, non-proprietary peer reviewed research program process for 3-year programs, or fast-turnaround experiments. Research proposals are accepted and reviewed twice yearly via the ACNS Customer Portal.
