= Open-pool Australian lightwater reactor =

Research nuclear reactor in Australia

Coordinates: 34°03′05″S 150°58′44″E

The Open-pool Australian lightwater reactor (OPAL) is a 20 megawatt (MW) swimming pool nuclear research reactor. Officially opened in April 2007, it replaced the High Flux Australian Reactor (HIFAR) as Australia's only nuclear reactor, and is located at the Australian Nuclear Science and Technology Organisation’s (ANSTO) research establishment in Lucas Heights, a suburb of Sydney, New South Wales. Both OPAL and its predecessor have been known simply as the Lucas Heights reactor.

== Uses ==
The main reactor uses are:

- Irradiation of target materials to produce radioisotopes for medical and industrial applications
- Research in the fields of materials science and structural biology using neutron beams and its sophisticated suite of experimental equipment
- Analysis of minerals and samples using the neutron activation technique and the delay neutron activation technique
- Irradiation of silicon ingots in order to dope them with phosphorus and produce the basic material used in the manufacturing of semiconductor devices

The reactor runs on an operation cycle of 30 days non-stop at full power, followed by a stop of 5 days to reshuffle the fuel.

Typically the reactor runs for a total of 300 days at power per year.

== History ==
The Argentine company INVAP was responsible through a turnkey contract, signed in June 2000, for the delivery of the reactor, performing the design, construction and commissioning. Local civil construction was performed by INVAP's partner, John Holland-Evans Deakin Industries. The facility features a large (20-litre (4.4 imp gal; 5.3 US gal)) liquid-deuterium cold neutron source, modern supermirror guides, and a 35 by 65 metres (115 ft × 213 ft) guide hall. The cold source was designed by the Petersburg Nuclear Physics Institute, the cryogenic system designed and supplied by Air Liquide and the initial set of four supermirror guides supplied by Mirrotron.

On 17 December 2001, 46 Greenpeace activists occupied the Lucas Heights facility to protest the construction of OPAL. Protestors gained access to the grounds, the HIFAR reactor, the high-level radioactive waste store and the radio tower. Their protest highlighted the security and environmental risks of the production of nuclear materials and the shipment of radioactive waste from the facility.

OPAL was opened on 20 April 2007 by then Australian Prime Minister John Howard and is the replacement for the HIFAR reactor. ANSTO received an operating licence from the Australian Radiation Protection and Nuclear Safety Agency (ARPANSA) in July 2006, allowing commencement of hot commissioning, where fuel is first loaded into the reactor core. OPAL went critical for the first time on the evening of 12 August 2006 and reached full power on the morning of 3 November 2006.

== Facility details ==
The OPAL reactor pools. Made of stainless steel and 4.5-metre (15 ft) wide, it contains demineralised water used for shielding and cooling.

The reactor core consists of 16 low-enriched plate-type fuel assemblies and is located under 13 metres (43 ft) of water in an open pool. Light water (normal H_{2}O) is used as the coolant and moderator while heavy water (D_{2}O) is used as the neutron reflector. The purpose of the neutron reflector is to improve neutron economy in the reactor, and hence to increase the maximum neutron flux.

OPAL is the centrepiece of the facilities at ANSTO, providing radiopharmaceutical and radioisotope production, irradiation services (including neutron transmutation doping of silicon), neutron activation analysis and neutron beam research. OPAL is able to produce four times as many radioisotopes for nuclear medicine treatments as the old HIFAR reactor, and a wider array of radioisotopes for the treatment of disease. The modern design includes a cold neutron source (CNS).

The OPAL reactor already has received seven awards in Australia.

== Neutron scattering at OPAL ==
The Bragg Institute at ANSTO hosts OPAL's neutron scattering facility. It is now running as a user facility serving the scientific community in Australia and around the world. New funding was received in 2009 in order to install further competitive instruments and beamlines. The actual facility comprises the following instruments:

=== ECHIDNA ===
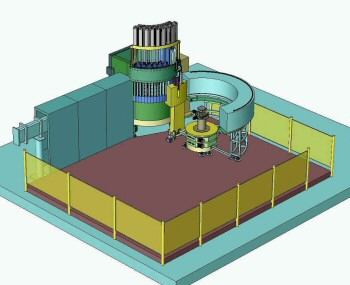
Engineering drawing of the ECHIDNA High-Resolution Powder Diffractometer (August 2003)

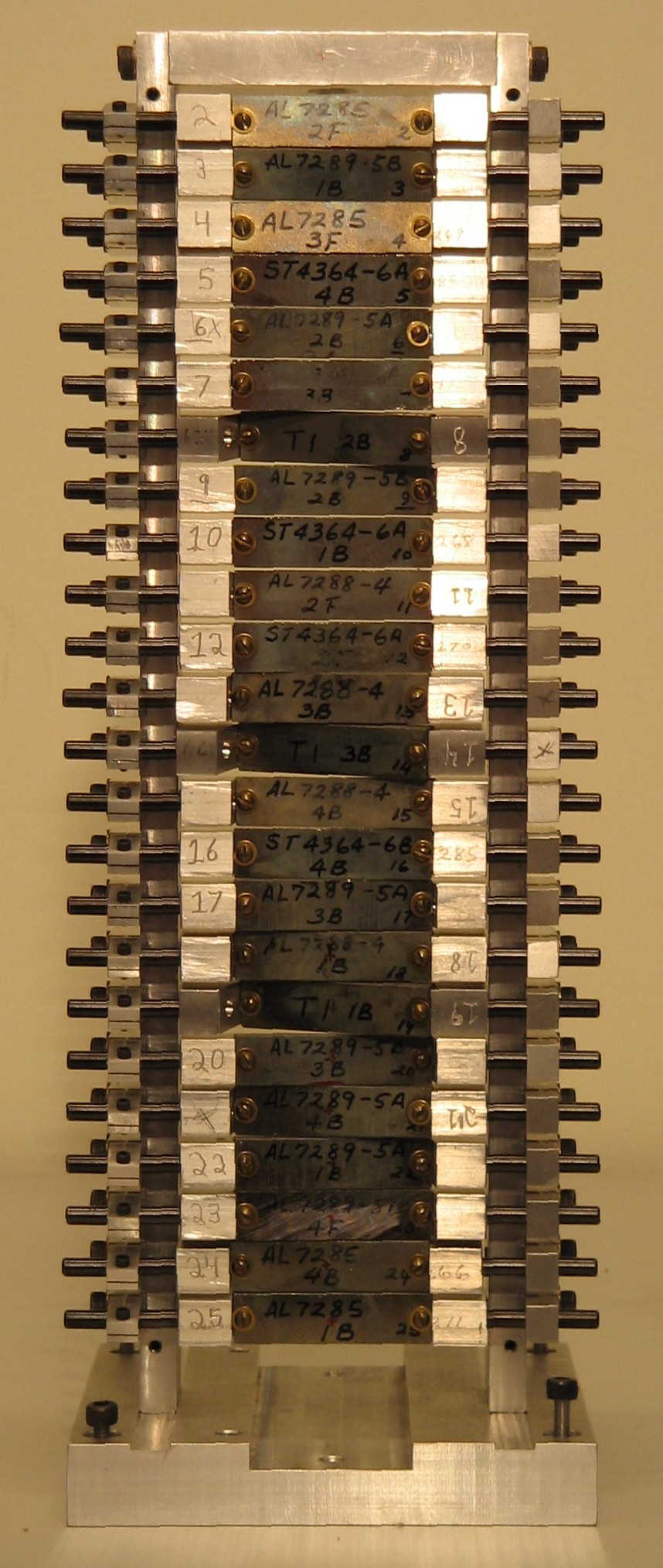
The Ge-115 monochromator has been acquired from the Brookhaven National Laboratory.

ECHIDNA is the name of the high-resolution neutron powder diffractometer. The instrument serves to determine the crystalline structures of materials using neutron radiation analogous to X-ray techniques. It is named after the Australian monotreme echidna, as the spiny peaks of the instrument looks like an echidna.

It operates with thermal neutrons. One of the main features is the array of 128 collimators and position sensitive detectors for rapid data acquisition. ECHIDNA allows for structure determinations, texture measurements and reciprocal space mapping of single crystals in most different sample environments serving the physics, chemistry, materials, minerals and earth-science communities. ECHIDNA is part of the Bragg Institute's park of neutron scattering instruments.

==== Components ====
- Neutron guide
  The instrument is located on the TG1 thermal neutron guide of the OPAL reactor. The distance from the reactor is 58 metres (190 ft). The position is the second on the guide after the WOMBAT instrument. The size of the guide is 300 millimetres (12 in) high by 50 millimetres (2.0 in) wide, and it is plated with supermirror coatings.
- Primary collimator
  There are Söller collimators prior to the monochromator in order to reduce the divergence of the beam and to increase the angular resolution of the instrument. Since this is an intensity compromise, two items of 5' and 10', respectively, can be interchanged or fully removed by an automated mechanism. The collimators cover the full size of the beam delivered by the neutron guide.
- Monochromator
  The monochromator is made by slabs of [115] oriented Germanium crystals which are inclined towards each other in order to focus down the Bragg reflected beam. The device has been acquired from the Brookhaven National Laboratory in the US after the shutdown of their neutron facility.
- Secondary collimator
  Optionally a secondary collimator with 10' angular acceptance and 200 by 20 millimetres (7.87 in × 0.79 in) can be placed in the monochromatic beam between the monochromator and the sample, which again influences the resolution function of the instrument.
- Slit system
  Two automated sets of horizontal and vertical pairs of absorbing plates allow to cut down the size of the monochromatic beam prior to the secondary collimator and sample size. They remove unwanted neutrons and reduce the background near the detector. In addition, they allow selection of the sample position to be studied.
- Beam monitor
  A ^{235}U fission monitor measures the amount of neutrons incident to the sample. The efficiency is 10^{−4} and most neutrons traverse the device undisturbed. The monitor counts are important to correct for beam flux variations due to changes in the reactor or at the upstream instrument.
- Sample stage
  The sample is supported by a heavy load goniometer consisting of a 360° vertical omega rotation axis, x-y translation tables and a chi-phi cross tilt stage of ±20° range. It can hold a few hundred kilograms in order to support heavier sample environments, such as cryostats, furnaces, magnets, load frames, reaction chambers and others. A typical powder sample is filled into vanadium cans which give little unstructured background. The mentioned sample environment allows measurement of changes in the sample as a function of external parameters, like temperature, pressure, magnetic field, etc. The goniometer stage is redundant for most powder diffraction measurements, but will be important for single crystal and texture measurements, where the orientation of the sample plays a role.
- Detector collimators
  A set of 128 detectors each equipped which a 5' collimator in front are arranged in a 160° sector focusing to the sample. The collimators select the scattered radiation into the well defined ranges of 128 angular positions. The whole collimator and detector setup is mounted on a common table which is scanned in finer steps around the sample, to be combined further into a continuous diffraction pattern.
- Detector tubes
  The 128 linear position-sensitive ^{3}He gas detector tubes cover the full opening height of 300 millimetres (12 in) behind the collimators. They determine the position of the neutron event by charge division over the resistive anode towards each end of the detector. Overall and local count rates lie in the several 10000 Hz range.

=== PLATYPUS ===
PLATYPUS is a time-of-flight reflectometer built on the cold neutron source. The instrument serves to determine the structure of interfaces using highly collimated neutron beams. These beams are shone on to the surface at low angles (typically less than 2 degrees) and the intensity of the reflected radiation is measured as a function of angle of incidence.

It operates using cold neutrons with a wavelength band of 0.2–2.0 nm. Although up to three different angles of incidence are required for each reflectivity curve, the time-of-flight nature means that timescales of kinetic processes are accessible. By analysing the reflected signal one builds a picture of the chemical structure of the interface. This instrument can be used for examining biomembranes, lipid bilayers, magnetism, adsorbed surfactant layers, etc.

It is named after Ornithorhynchus anatinus, the semi-aquatic monotreme mammal native to Australia.

=== WOMBAT ===
WOMBAT is a high-intensity neutron powder diffractometer. The instrument serves to determine the crystalline structures of materials using neutron radiation analogous to X-ray techniques. It is named after the wombat, a marsupial indigenous to Australia.

It will operate with thermal neutrons. It has been designed for highest flux and data acquisition speed in order to deliver time resolved diffraction patterns in a fraction of a second. Wombat will concentrate on in-situ studies and time critical investigations, such as structure determinations, texture measurements and reciprocal space mapping of single crystals in most different sample environments serving the physics, chemistry, materials, minerals and earth-science communities.

=== KOWARI ===
KOWARI is a neutron residual stress diffractometer. Strain scanning using thermal neutrons is a powder diffraction technique in a polycrystalline block of material probing the change of atomic spacing due to internal or external stress. It is named after the kowari, an Australian marsupial.

It provides a diagnostic non-destructive tool to optimise e.g. post weld heat treatment (PWHT, similar to tempering) of welded structures. Tensile stresses for example drive crack growth in engineering components and compressive stresses inhibit crack growth (for example cold-expanded holes subject to fatigue cycling). Life extension strategies have high economic impact and strain scanning provides the stresses needed to calculate remaining life as well as the means to monitor the condition of components since it is non-destructive. One of the main features is the sample table that will allow examination of large engineering components while orienting and positioning them very accurately.

=== Others ===
- TAIPAN - Thermal 3-Axis Spectrometer
- KOALA - Laue Diffractometer
- QUOKKA - Small-Angle Neutron Scattering
- PELICAN - Cold-Neutron Time-of-Flight Spectrometer
- SIKA - Cold 3-Axis Spectrometer
- KOOKABURRA - Ultra-Small-Angle Neutron Scattering (USANS)
- DINGO - Neutron Radiography, Tomography and Imaging

== Performance ==
During the initial testing and commissioning period, all the equipment and systems were tested individually, and then in an integrated manner. Initial tests were carried out without nuclear fuel loaded into the core, and then a careful plan was followed for loading nuclear fuel into the reactor core, and subsequently reaching a nuclear chain reaction for the first time. Power to the reactor was increased in successive stages to finally allow the reactor to run at its full output. Once commissioning was completed, Australia’s nuclear regulator, the Australian Radiation Protection and Nuclear Safety Agency (ARPANSA), issued a licence that authorised OPAL’s operation at full power. During the first operation cycles, a typical teething period of a first of a kind design occurred. The reactor has proven itself to be a reliable supplier of radiopharmaceuticals, while also serving as a neutron source to conduct material research.

Since being commissioned, the reactor has been running with a very high availability: during the term 2012–13 it operated 265 days at full power (including an extended routine maintenance period), during 2013–14 for 294 days at full power, and during 2014–15 it operated 307 days at full power. In September 2016 it has accumulated a total of 2200 equivalent Full Power Days. In each 30 day operating cycle, more than 150 batches of silicon are irradiated, and molybdenum-99 is produced on a regular basis for the nuclear medicine market.

By August 2026 OPAL marked 20 years of operations, having delivered over 10 million nuclear medicine doses, irradiated over 900 tonnes of silicone ingots and created neutrons for thousands of scientific experiments. Regarding research with neutrons, the Australian Centre for Neutron Scattering (formerly Bragg Institute) features more than 120 scientists and 13 neutron beam operational instruments, and has produced more than 600 scientific research papers using the neutrons coming from OPAL core.

== See also ==
- Spallation Neutron Source
