= Bragge =

Bragge is a surname. Notable people with the surname include:

- Charles Bragge (1754–1831), English politician, changed name to Charles Bathurst in 1804
- James Bragge (1833–1908), English-born New Zealand photographer
- William Bragge (1823–1884), English engineer, antiquarian and author

== See also ==
- Bragg (surname)
- Braggs (disambiguation)
