= Brag =

Brag or BRAG may refer to:

== People and fictional characters ==
- Albin Brag (1878–1937), a Swedish architect
- Eva Brag (1829–1913), a Swedish writer
- Brag, a character in The Trigan Empire, a science fiction comic series
- Brag (folklore), a creature from the folklore of Northumbria, England

== Other uses ==
- Bicycle Ride Across Georgia, an annual road cycling tour in the state of Georgia, United States
- Boasting, speaking with excessive pride about one's achievements, possessions, or abilities
- Three card brag, a British card game

== See also ==
- The Brag Media, an Australian publishing company
- Bragg (disambiguation)
- June Bragger (1929–1997), English cricketer
