= Mike Quigley (businessman) =

Australian telecommunication business executive (born 1953)

Mike Quigley AM
- Born: Michael P. Quigley
- Education: Bachelor of Science, Bachelor of Engineering
- Alma mater: University of New South Wales
- Occupation: Business executive
- Years active: 1971–present
- Employer: Australian Nuclear Science and Technology Organisation
- Title: Chair
- Term: June 2024 – June 2028

Michael Quigley AM is an Australian telecommunication business executive. He was the first Chief Executive Officer of NBN Co. He is chair of the Australian Nuclear Science and Technology Organisation (ANSTO) until 19 June 2028.

== Early life and education ==
Michael Quigley studied at the University of New South Wales, where he received a Bachelor of Science (Mathematics/Physics) and Bachelor of Engineering (Hons 1).

== Career ==
=== Alcatel ===
From 1971 to 2007 Quigley worked for Alcatel, including the position of COO for the company's American arm. At Alcatel Australia he was responsible for Alcatel's business in Australia and New Zealand and established an early focus on research and development and technical management. At Alcatel USA he was Chief Operating Officer in US, President and Chief Executive Officer of Alcatel’s Fixed Communications Group in Paris. He was President responsible for infrastructure products, including network switches and optical communications systems. He was Alcatel's Chief Operating Officer.

=== NBN ===
Quigley was appointed chief executive officer (CEO) of NBN Co on 25 July 2009. In June 2010 he would donate $2 million to Neuroscience Research Australia (NeuRA), which will use the NBN to deliver remote rehabilitation therapy to stroke patients via the Nintendo Wii game console. Two million dollars is approximately equivalent to the NBN CEO's first year salary.

Mike Quigley announced in July 2013 that he would retire from NBN Co, staying on until a new CEO was found. He departed on 3 October 2013, replaced by former OPTUS & Telstra CEO Ziggy Switkowski as Executive Chairman (and Interim CEO) with immediate effect.

In December 2013, Telsoc (formerly ATUG), the Australian Society for Telecommunications & Digital Communications, awarded their "Charles Todd Medal" for Excellence in Telecommunications to Michael Malone and Mike Quigley. Quigley's acceptance speech at Telsoc.

In 2015 Quigley, as past CEO of NBN Co, publicly attacked the NBN and the MTM, noting cost blowouts and delays that he said were the fault of changes made by the Coalition government to the rollout plan.

=== ANSTO ===
Quigley was appointed chair of the Australian Nuclear Science and Technology Organisation board on 20 June 2024; his term ends on 19 June 2028.

== Other roles ==
Quigley was a board member of Alliance for Telecommunications Industry Solutions (ATIS).

He is director of the Prince of Wales Medical Research Institute.

== Recognition and honours ==
In 2022, Quigley was appointed Member of the Order of Australia in the 2022 Queen's Birthday Honours for "significant service to the telecommunications sector, and to education".

As of 2025 Quigley is adjunct professor at the School of Electrical and Data Engineering at the University of Technology Sydney.

He is a Fellow of the Australian Academy of Technological Sciences and Engineering.

Business positions
New title	Chief Executive of nbn™ 24 July 2009 – 3 October 2013	Succeeded by Ziggy Switkowski
