= Australian Nuclear Science and Technology Organisation =

Australian government statutory body

Agency overview
- Formed: 1987
- Preceding agency: Australian Atomic Energy Commission
- Jurisdiction: Australian Government
- Headquarters: Lucas Heights, New South Wales, Australia; 34°02′56″S 150°58′30″E
- Motto: Science. Ingenuity. Sustainability.
- Employees: 1,000+
- Minister responsible: Tim Ayres, Minister for Science, Minister for Industry and Innovation
- Agency executives: Michael Quigley, Chair of ANSTO; Shaun Jenkinson, Chief Executive Officer
- Parent department: Department of Industry, Science and Resources
- Key document: Australian Nuclear Science and Technology Organisation Act 1987 (Cth)
- Website: ansto.gov.au

The Australian Nuclear Science and Technology Organisation (ANSTO) is a statutory body of the Australian Government that is responsible for nuclear research and the production of radioisotopes for nuclear medicine. It operates a number of advanced research instruments, including the OPAL reactor and ANTARES particle accelerator. ANSTO's headquarters and main research facilities are on the southern outskirts of Sydney in Lucas Heights, Sutherland Shire.

== History ==
ANSTO was established in April 1987 to replace the former Australian Atomic Energy Commission, which was founded in 1952.

== Purpose ==
The Australian Nuclear Science and Technology Organisation Act 1987 (Cth) prescribes its general purpose.

=== Mission statement ===
- To support the development and implementation of government policies and initiatives in nuclear and related areas, domestically and internationally
- To operate nuclear science and technology based facilities, for the benefit of industry and the Australian and international research community
- To undertake research that will advance the application of nuclear science and technology
- To apply nuclear science, techniques, and expertise to address Australia 's environmental challenges and increase the competitiveness of Australian industry
- To manufacture and advance the use of radiopharmaceuticals which will improve the health of Australians

== Governance ==
ANSTO is governed by a board, chaired by Michael Quigley from 20 June 2024 until 19 June 2028. As of December 2025, Shaun Jenkinson is CEO of the organisation. He joined the ANSTO Health team in 2010, becoming Group Executive Nuclear Business, before being appointed CEO.

== Facilities and instruments ==
ANSTO operates five research facilities:

1. OPAL research reactor
2. Centre for Accelerator Science
3. Australian Centre for Neutron Scattering
4. Cyclotron facility
5. Australian Synchrotron

Major research instruments include:

- The ANTARES particle accelerator
- High-resolution neutron powder diffractometer, ECHIDNA
- High-intensity neutron powder diffractometer, WOMBAT
- Strain scanner, KOWARI
- Neutron reflectometer, PLATYPUS

ANSTO also manufactures radiopharmaceuticals and performs commercial work such as silicon doping by nuclear transmutation.

== Nuclear reactors ==
ANSTO has two nuclear research reactors onsite: The High Flux Australian Reactor, or HIFAR, in operation from 1958 to 2007, and the Open-pool Australian lightwater reactor (OPAL) designed by the Argentine company INVAP. HIFAR was permanently shut down on 30 January 2007. The OPAL reactor came online in November 2006 and the facility was officially opened on 20 April 2007.

A third, smaller unit, being a 100 kW thermal Argonaut-class reactor named MOATA, was in operation between 1961 and 1995, before being decommissioned in 2009. The reactor was initially commissioned to train Australian nuclear scientists in the operation of HIFAR, but its envelope was later widened to include neutron imaging and activation analysis, soil analysis, and radioisotopic medical research.

Spent fuel from the reactors is transported to Port Kembla, then shipped to France for reprocessing.

In 2017, ANSTO announced the creation of a NiMo-SiC alloy for use in molten salt reactors.

== Rare-earth processing facility ==
Australia's first rare-earth processing facility is under construction by ANSTO in Sydney, due for completion in 2026. The facility will process rare earths found in clay, and will be used by rare-earth companies from across Australia, with Australian Rare Earths's proposed Koppamurra mining project first to use it.

== See also ==
- Australian Radiation Protection and Nuclear Safety Agency
- Australian Federal Police
- Defence Science and Technology Organisation
- Australian Safeguards and Non-proliferation Office
- Lucas Heights Resource Recovery Park
