= Bragg House =

Bragg House may refer to:

in the United States

(by state)

- Bragg-Mitchell House, Mobile, AL, listed on the NRHP in Alabama
- Bragg Guesthouse, Little Rock, AR, listed on the NRHP in Arkansas
- Bragg House (Camden, Arkansas), listed on the NRHP in Arkansas
- Bragg's Pies Building, Phoenix, AZ, listed on the NRHP in Arizona
- Bragg, Caleb, Estate, Montauk, NY, listed on the NRHP in New York
- Amis-Bragg House, Jackson, NC, listed on the NRHP in North Carolina
