= Australian Safeguards and Non-proliferation Office =

The Australian Safeguards and Non-proliferation Office (ASNO) was established by the Australian Government to enhance national and international security by contributing to "effective regimes against the proliferation of weapons of mass destruction." It combines three Commonwealth agencies: the Australian Safeguards Office (ASO), the Chemical Weapons Convention Office (CWCO), and the Australian Comprehensive Test Ban Office (ACTBO).

ASNO's Director General is a statutory officer, and his staff are public servants employed by the Department of Foreign Affairs and Trade (DFAT). The Director General has reported directly to the Minister for Foreign Affairs since 1994.
