= Bragg, West Virginia =

Unincorporated community in West Virginia, United States

- Unincorporated community
- Location within West Virginia Location within the United States
- Coordinates: 37°46′56″N 80°59′25″W
- Country: United States
- State: West Virginia
- County: Raleigh
- Elevation: 2,779 ft (847 m)
- Time zone: UTC-5 (Eastern (EST))
  - Summer (DST): UTC-4 (EDT)
- Area codes: 304 & 681
- GNIS feature ID: 1536293

Bragg is an unincorporated community in Raleigh County, West Virginia, United States. Bragg is 11 miles (18 km) east of Beckley.

A variant name was New; the present name is after the local Bragg family.
