= Neutron supermirror =

Highly-polished material in particle physics

A neutron supermirror is a highly polished, layered material used to reflect neutron beams. Supermirrors are a special case of multi-layer neutron reflectors with varying layer thicknesses.

The first neutron supermirror concept was proposed by Ferenc Mezei, inspired by earlier work with X-rays.

Supermirrors are produced by depositing alternating layers of strongly contrasting substances, such as nickel and titanium, on a smooth substrate. A single layer of high-refractive-index material (e.g. nickel) exhibits total external reflection at small grazing angles up to a critical angle $\theta_c$. For nickel with natural isotopic abundances, $\theta_c$ in degrees is approximately $0.1 \cdot \lambda$ where $\lambda$ is the neutron wavelength in angstroms.

A mirror with a larger effective critical angle can be made by exploiting diffraction (with non-zero losses) that occurs from stacked multilayers. The critical angle of total reflection, in degrees, becomes approximately $0.1 \cdot \lambda \cdot m$, where $m$ is the "m-value" relative to natural nickel. Values of $m$ in the range of 1–3 are common; in specific areas for high divergence (e.g. using focussing optics near the source, choppers, or experimental areas), $m=6$ is readily available.

Nickel has a positive scattering cross section, and titanium has a negative scattering cross section, and in both elements the absorption cross section is small, which makes Ni–Ti the most efficient technology with neutrons. The number of Ni–Ti layers needed increases rapidly as $\propto m^z$, with $z$ in the range 2–4, which affects cost. This has a strong bearing on the economic strategy of neutron instrument design.
