= John Bragg =

John Bragg may refer to:

- John Bragg (politician) (1806–1878), United States politician
- John Bragg (businessman) (born 1940), Canadian businessman
- John Bragg (climber), United States rock climber and alpine climber
- Johnny Bragg (1925–2004), musician with The Prisonaires
- John Bragg (stockbroker) (1796–1868), English stockbroker and financier
