= Charles Bragg =

American artist and author

- Born: Charles Bragg; 1931; St. Louis, Missouri, U.S.
- Died: January 9, 2017
- Education: High School of Music & Art
- Known for: sculptor, painter
- Notable work: The Screen Goddess
- Style: Social commentary
- Children: Charles Lynn Bragg, Georgia Bragg
- Awards: National Society of Illustrators Gold Medal; Art Directors Guild of New York Award of Merit
- Website: www.charlesbragg.com

Charles Bragg (1931 – January 9, 2017) was an American sculptor, painter, artist and author known best for his satirical artwork.

== Early life ==
Bragg was born in St. Louis, Missouri, in 1931. His parents were Vaudeville performers, and he spent most of his young life traveling on tour with them. During his teenage years, he went to New York's High School of Music & Art in Harlem. At 18, he ran away with his high school sweetheart, fellow artist Jennie Tomao.

== Career ==
Before pursuing art, Bragg worked as a cow driver, a truck driver, a stand-up comedian, and a factory worker. He eventually settled in California, where he began his artistic career. He started by painting portraits of wealthy families, as well as offering lessons. He began to pursue his own creative work and experienced some success. His success came from the humor and satirical style of his work, which often portrayed flaws in American society. His political opinions are featured in his work. Bragg has referred to himself as a "devoted student of the human race" and an "observer."

Bragg's works have been showcased in museums and exhibits around the world, and he has had work commissioned by Playboy magazine. In 1986, PBS made a documentary about him called "Charles Bragg - One of a Kind." One of Bragg's lithographs, The Screen Goddess, is featured prominently in the opening scene of the 1992 Robert Altman film, The Player.

== Books ==
He has published and his work has been featured in books.

- Longbeard the Wizard by Sid Fleischman, illustrated by Charles Bragg (Jun 1970)
- Charles Bragg: The Works! A Retrospective by Alan Bisbort (Oct 1999)
- Charles Bragg on the Law by Charles Bragg (Nov 1, 1984)
- Charles Bragg on Medicine by Charles Bragg (Nov 1984)
- Asylum Earth by Charles Bragg (October 15, 1994)

== Awards ==
Bragg has won many awards, including the Gold Medal for the National Society of Illustrators as well as the Award of Merit from the Art Directors Guild of New York.

== Personal life ==
Bragg lived in Beverly Hills. He had two children and died on January 9, 2017, at the age of 85.
