= Patricia Bragg =

American businesswoman (1929–2023)

- Born: Patricia Pendleton; April 29, 1929; Oakland, California, U.S.
- Died: August 10, 2023 (aged 94); Goleta, California, U.S.
- Education: University of California, Berkeley
- Spouses: Robert E. Bragg (m. 1952; div. 1957) James Cameron Gilroy (m. 1976; div. 1976)
- Parents: Harry Clay Pendleton (father); Nettie Deacon Pendleton (née Coward) (mother)
- Relatives: Paul C. Bragg (ex-father-in-law)

Patricia Bragg (née Pendleton; April 29, 1929 – August 10, 2023) was an American businesswoman, author, and health consultant. She served as the chief executive officer of Bragg Live Food Products and Books, and chairperson of the Bragg Health Institute.

== Early life ==
Patricia Pendleton was born in Oakland, California, on April 29, 1929, daughter of Harry Clay Pendleton (1874–1961), a building contractor, and Nettie (née Coward) Deacon Pendleton (1898–1964). She was raised in Piedmont, California, where she attended both grammar school and high school. She graduated from Mary Wallace School, a private Piedmont high school for girls, in June 1947.

After finishing high school, she attended the University of California, Berkeley for two years. In an interview published in the Santa Barbara News-Press on March 8, 2011, Bragg said she graduated from that institution with a "bachelor's degree in biochemistry". Bragg reported having earned a Ph.D. in health science in 1973 and doctor of naturopathy degree in 1974 from Bernadean University in Nevada, according to an archived article in the Santa Barbara News-Press; "schools of naturopathic medicine offered training but were not recognized by the medical profession when Dr. Bragg wanted to earn her degree." Bernadean University was not accredited institution.

On April 19, 1952, Patricia Pendleton and Robert E. Bragg (1922–1993) married at the First Presbyterian Church in Phoenix, Arizona. The marriage did not last long and they divorced in 1957, in Los Angeles County, California. Prior to and following their divorce proceedings, Bragg assisted her former father-in-law, Paul C. Bragg, with his health products business.

== Business ==
Paul C. Bragg founded Bragg Live Food Products in 1912; Patricia assisted him with the enterprise. Patricia Bragg later appeared on Paul Bragg's Health & Happiness TV show, which ran from September 1959 to an unknown date on Channel 9, KHJ-TV, in Los Angeles, CA. She co-authored a number of books with Paul Bragg earlier in her career, and later was the sole author of many of the later Bragg health books; Goodreads lists 28 distinct works under her name.

Patricia Bragg became chief executive officer of Bragg Live Foods, Inc. sometime in the 1970s. The company acquired organic certification from organic certification agency CCOF (California Certified Organic Farmers) in 2013.

Bragg Live Foods was acquired in 2019 by a group of investors, led by private equity firm Swander Pace Capital, investment firm Dragoneer Investment Group and co-investors singer/songwriter Katy Perry, actor Orlando Bloom, and Hayden Slater, founder of Pressed Juicery; Bragg retired as CEO thereafter. Bragg Live Foods, Inc. is a producer of apple cider vinegar, and other health-focused food and dietary products.

== Death ==
Bragg died at her home in Goleta, California, on August 10, 2023, at the age of 94. "In addition to her work in the natural products industry, Patricia was an avid benefactor of her Santa Barbara community, where she supported local food pantries, animal shelters, and wildlife preservation efforts, in addition to naturopathic and nutrition educational efforts, according to the company."
