= Australian Radiation Protection and Nuclear Safety Agency =

Government agency of Australia

Agency overview
- Formed: 5 February 1999
- Preceding agencies: Nuclear Safety Bureau; Australian Radiation Laboratory
- Jurisdiction: Commonwealth of Australia
- Headquarters: Yallambie, Victoria
- Motto: Protecting people and the environment from the harmful effects of radiation
- Employees: 178
- Ministers responsible: The Hon Rebecca White MP, Assistant Minister for Health and Aged Care; Mark Butler, Minister for Health and Aged Care
- Agency executive: Dr Gillian Hirth AO, CEO
- Parent department: Department of Health, Disability and Ageing
- Website: www.arpansa.gov.au

The Australian Radiation Protection and Nuclear Safety Agency (ARPANSA) is a regulatory agency under the Commonwealth of Australia that aims to protect Australian citizens from both ionising and non-ionising radiation. ARPANSA works under the guidance of the Australian Radiation Protection and Nuclear Safety Act of 1998 as the national regulatory body of radiation in Australia, with independent departments within each state and territory that regulate radiation within each of their jurisdictions.

== History of Bill ==
The Australian Radiation Protection and Nuclear Safety (ARPANS) Bill 1998 was passed by the Australian House of Representatives in May 1998, however Parliament was prorogued for the Federal Election (held 3 October 1998) before the Bill could be considered by the Senate. The Bill was reintroduced into Parliament in November 1998 and passed by both Houses of Parliament on Thursday 10 December 1998.

== Responsibilities ==
ARPANSA's responsibilities include:

- Regulating Commonwealth entities that use or produce radiation
- Setting national standards for radiation use
- Protecting people and the environment from the harmful effects of radiation
- Auditing the safe use of radiation in medicine
- Promoting national radiation standards
- Providing advice to the Australian government and community about radiation or nuclear issues

ARPANSA evaluates research conducted by the International Commission on Non-Ionizing Radiation Protection (ICNIRP) and other foundations to set standards founded on extensive research.

== Radiation in Australia ==
Both ionising and non-ionising radiation is present in Australia, and can be found from man-made sources, or in natural sources as background radiation. Ionising radiation is radiation that does not exceed wavelengths over 100 nanometres, whereas non-ionising radiation exceeds wavelengths of 100 nanometres. Some of the common man-made sources of ionising radiation in Australia include x-rays, CT scans and naturally-found radioactive materials. The common sources of non-ionising radiation include mobile phones, power lines and the sun.

The average Australian is exposed annually to radiation at a level of 1,500-2,000 μSv, which is low in comparison to other countries, such as the 7,800 μSv annual level reported in Cornwall, United Kingdom. These amounts are considered to be natural background radiation levels and exposure to this is not harmful, but radiation can also be used for a variety of health-related purposes. Unlike natural background radiation, there are several risks involved with radiation and nuclear services when used for medical purposes, including increased cancer prevalence. Because of these risks, organisations that use radiation must do so safely and in accordance with regulatory requirements designed to protect people and the environment.

== History ==
From 1935–1972, the authorising body governing radiation in Australia was the Commonwealth X-Ray and Radium Laboratory. This was replaced by the Commonwealth Radiation Laboratory (1972–1973), and then the Australian Radiation Laboratory (1973–1999). In 1999, the Australian Radiation Laboratory then merged with the Nuclear Safety Bureau to create one agency that governed radiation and nuclear safety, ARPANSA. Since its establishment, ARPANSA has offices in both Sydney, NSW, and Melbourne, Victoria.

== Safety standards ==
ARPANSA develops national radiation protection codes and standards that support the safe use of radiation across Australia. ARPANSA consults other health agencies globally, as well as research from relevant disciplines, and forms the standards based on this evidence. The IAEA’s standards and the ICRP’s recommendations are considered when setting ARPANSA’s standards and are established to assign responsibility of safe methods with the use of ionising radiation.

ARPANSA monitors compliance with licence conditions and regulatory requirements through inspections and other regulatory activities. Where non-compliance is identified, ARPANSA can take enforcement action. ARPANSA’s main licence holder is the Australian Nuclear Science and Technology Organisation.

All standards set by ARPANSA must also be assessed by the Australian Government, such as the standard for radiofrequency electromagnetic radiation (RF EMR) that was set by ARPANSA in 2002 and then updated in 2021. This standard specified that adverse health effects can be avoided with RF EMR levels within the range of 3 kHz- 300 GHz.

== Services ==
The agency also publishes daily solar ultraviolet radiation (UVR) levels for many locations in Australia. This UV radiation index is based on data received by ARPANSA's UV detectors from cities through Australia which continuously collect data and update the site each minute. This information also provides data for the Cancer Council’s SunSmart App. ARPANSA also provides testing of clothing, sunglasses and shade cloths, and provides labels to indicate when a product fits Australian sun-protective standards.

== Structure ==
The most senior staff member of ARPANSA is the CEO, who is always appointed by the Governor-General, and each term as CEO cannot exceed five years. The CEO is currently Dr Gillian Hirth AO, who was appointed in March 2022. The majority of activities are regulated by the individual state and territory departments, with ARPANSA only regulating six different commonwealth entities. In 2024-25, ARPANSA regulated 37 Commonwealth entities. ARPANSA does not regulate non-Commonwealth entities. These are instead regulated by state and territory regulatory bodies, where the individual regulatory bodies are as follows:

- NSW EPA
- QLD Health
- VIC Department of Health
- SA EPA
- TAS Department of Health
- WA Radiological Council
- NT Department of Health
- ACT Health and Community Services Directorate

Under the ARPANS Act of 1998, the founding of ARPANSA also established the formation of the Radiation Health and Safety Advisory Council, the Radiation Health Committee and the Nuclear Safety Committee. All of these groups consist of the CEO and an individual to represent the interests of the general public, as well as other specialty members.

The functions of the Radiation Health and Safety Advisory Council include providing advice to the CEO, identifying emerging issues relating to radiation protection and nuclear safety and examine matters of community concern, among others. The members include:

- Two radiation control officers
- An individual nominated by the chief minister of the NT
- Eight other members

The functions of the Radiation Health Committee include developing and reviewing national policies, codes, and standards for radiation protection, and to consult publicly on them, among others. The members include:

- A radiation control officer from each state/territory
- A nuclear safety committee representative
- Two other members

The Nuclear Safety Committee reviews and assesses the effectiveness of the current standards and codes, and to advise the CEO of any issues relating to nuclear safety. The members include:

- A radiation health committee representative
- A local government representative
- Eight other members

== Acclaim ==
After a new quality testing system was implemented at ARPANSA, the agency was accredited by the National Association of Testing Authorities (NATA) to ISO/IEC 17025 in 2007. After the new accreditation, ARPANSA calibration reports then became recognised internationally under the Mutual Recognition Arrangement (MRA).

In 2018, the director general of the Radiation and Nuclear Safety Authority in Finland, Petteri Tiipana, stated that "Australia has demonstrated a strong commitment to continuous improvement in nuclear and radiation safety and in regulatory oversight of such facilities and activities". Following this in 2019, the deputy CEO and head of radiation health services at ARPANSA was appointed chair the United Nations Scientific Committee on the Effects of Atomic Radiation (UNSCEAR). The position was previously held by Dr Hans Vanmarcke of the Nuclear Research Centre in Belgium and will be chaired by Dr Gillian Hirth of ARPANSA for sessions 66 and 67 in 2019 and 2020. The appointment of Dr Hirth to UNSCEAR was considered to be a recognition of her expertise and leadership in radiation health.

Since the 1980s, ARPANSA has had an ongoing collaboration with Cancer Council Victoria (CCV). This collaboration has included collaborating on research to increase understanding on protective sun behaviours and raise awareness about exposure to radiation. In 2016, ARPANSA and CCV signed a Memorandum of Understanding to improve health in regards to radiation exposure and solar ultraviolet radiation. In 2017, ARPANSA were then recognised as a SunSmart workplace by the then Assistant Minister for Health Dr David Gillespie. Prior to this recognition, CCV had only recognised schools and childhood centres in their commitment to protect staff from UV radiation. CCV’s Prevention Director Craig Sinclair commented that the recognition came at a good time due to it occurring during National Skin Cancer Action Week.

== Criticisms and controversies ==
=== 2005 audit ===
From the ANAO audit in 2005, ARPANSA was found to lack a systematic approach to planning, as well as performing monitoring radiological activities. From this audit, ANAO made 19 recommendations, but limited work was made by ARPANSA to enact these, with only 11 being adequately implemented by the following audit in 2014. One of the ANAO comments from the audit stated that ARPANSA's operational objectives are too vague to be assessable.

=== Lucas Heights nuclear reactor ===
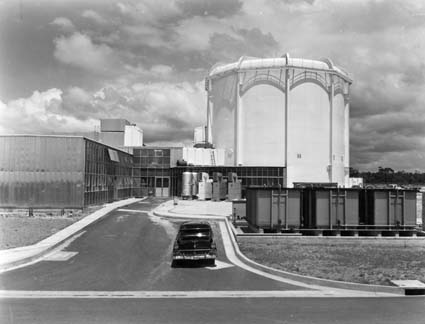
Nuclear Reactor at Lucas Heights

In 2010–2011, ARPANSA was publicly criticised in regards to allegations surrounding the nuclear reactor at Lucas Heights in Sydney. Claims in 2010 arose alleging that safety operational breaches were occurring at the nuclear reactor in Sydney. ARPANSA then released conflicting reports regarding the safety and operational breach claims, denying their existence. Late in 2010, these breaches were confirmed by Australia’s workplace regulator, COMCARE.

In March 2011, ARPANSA went under review again due to safety breaches and bullying occurring at the nuclear reactor. Then Science Minister, Kim Carr, was in charge of the departmental investigation into the relationship between ARPANSA and ANSTO. Later in July 2011, ARPANSA and ANSTO were investigated by the fraud control and audit branch of the department of health, who questioned their impartiality. Whistle-blowers gave reports to the Department of Health that alleged that the relationship between the companies was causing safety reports to be compromised. The Health Department questioned the impartiality of ARPANSA, which then led to a review of ARPANSA's regulatory powers by the federal government.

Criticisms of ARPANSA halted from 2011–2019, until workers at the nuclear reactor were exposed to unsafe doses of radiation in 2019. In April 2019, the nuclear facility was only granted permission to produce limited amounts of Molybdenum-99, but ARPANSA permitted full production on 13 June. Two weeks later, on 21 June, two workers were creating a Molybdenum-99 isotope when radioactive contamination was detected outside their working space. One of the workers touched the substance with their hand as they were removing their gloves, and the other worker made contact with their fingertips. At the time, it was unclear how much radiation the workers were exposed to, but was estimated by ANSTO to be equivalent to a single medical radiation treatment. Both ARPANSA and COMCARE were required to investigate the incident, and the final report released by ARPANSA stated that the radiation exposure received by the workers was two to three times above the statutory annual limit for hands.

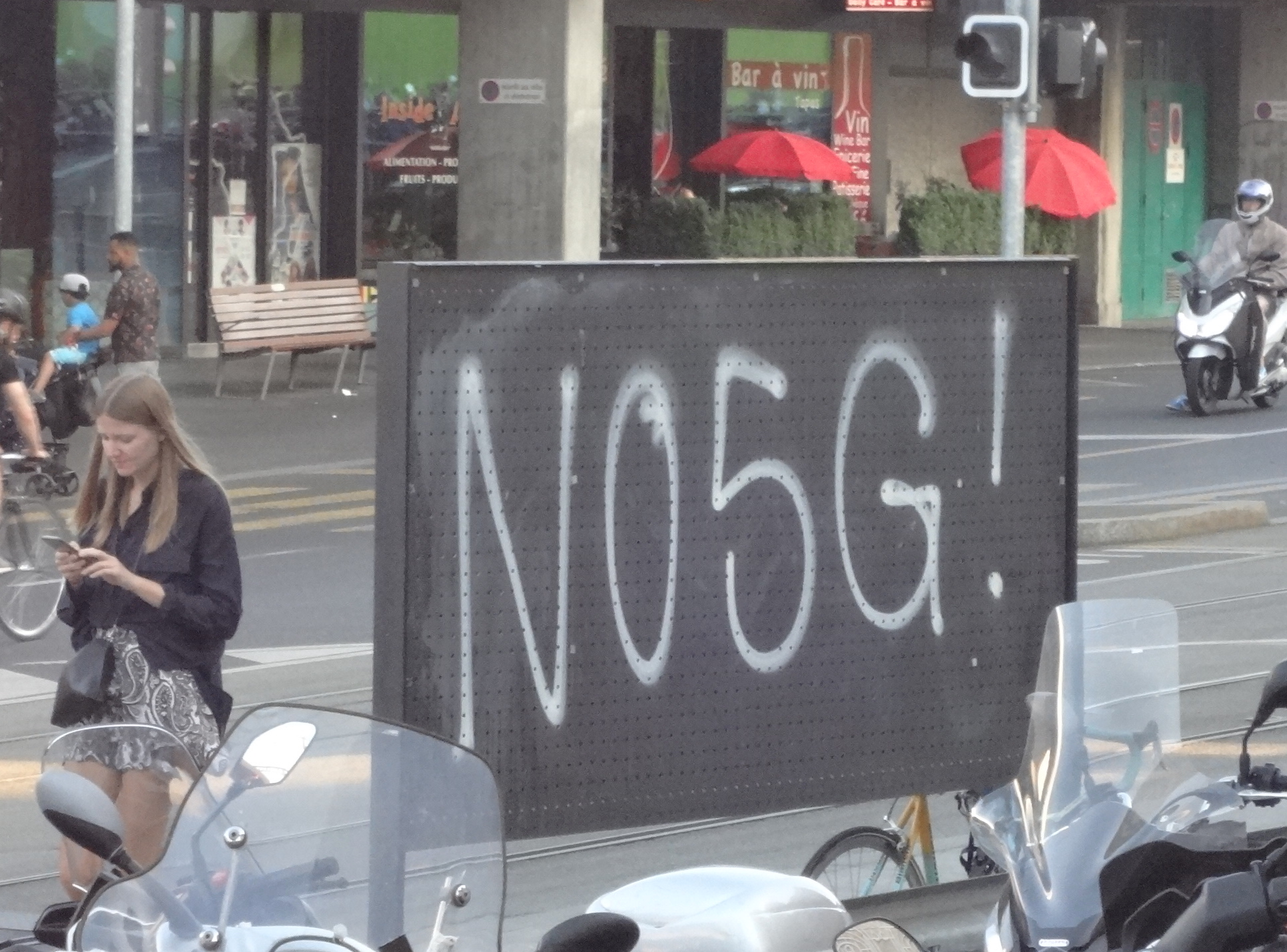
Citizens protesting against the use of 5G via public graffiti

=== 5G in Australia ===
From 2019 with the introduction of 5G in Australia, ARPANSA faced criticisms from the media and general public, amid fears that the technology was not safe. As of September 2019, Telstra and other telecommunications companies had declared that the use of 5G was safe for citizens, but ARPANSA had yet to comment on these claims. At that point in time, ARPANSA had only acknowledged the existence of concerns surrounding 5G technology, and were in regular discussions with multiple stakeholders to increase public understanding.

Citizens criticised ARPANSA for their alliance with the telecommunications companies, and alleged that they were acting in their interests rather than the health of citizens. In response, ARPANSA stated in June that they worked "independently from other parts of government and are not funded by industry", and are defined within the umbrella of a health agency, not a communications agency like Telstra. However, ARPANSA's official website declares they are not a health body and take no responsibility for the advice they have provided.

ARPANSA then made a statement declaring that the evidence shows that the levels of electromagnetic energy (EME) from devices like mobile phones do not pose a health risk to citizens. ARPANSA had set the standards for EME levels, and from the initial testing in 2016–2017, the EME levels for 5G were 1,000 times lower than the set standard. ARPANSA then advised the Australian government that 5G was safe, stating that the levels of 5G signals were less than 1% of the maximum radiation level considered safe for citizens in Australia. In response to this public turmoil questioning the safety of 5G, the Morrison government then announced additional funding to ARPANSA to allow for continuing research on 5G and other emerging technologies.

== See also ==
- Australian Nuclear Science and Technology Organisation
