= Australian Atomic Energy Commission =

Former government agency

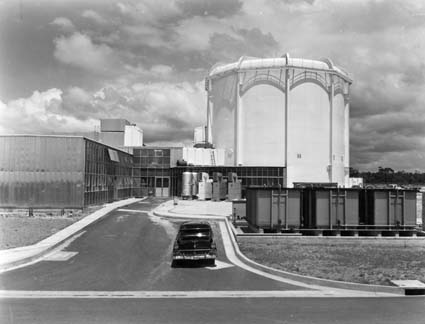
HIFAR reactor at Lucas Heights, 1958

The Australian Atomic Energy Commission (AAEC) was a statutory body of the Australian Government devoted to nuclear science, engineering and research.

It was established in 1952, replacing the Atomic Energy Policy Committee. In 1981, parts of the Commission were split off to become part of the CSIRO, the remainder continuing until 1987, when it was replaced by the Australian Nuclear Science and Technology Organisation (ANSTO). The Commission’s head office was based in the heritage-listed house Cliffbrook in Coogee, Sydney, New South Wales, while its main facilities were located at the Atomic Energy Research Establishment at Lucas Heights, to the south of Sydney, established in 1958.

Highlights of the Commission's history included:

- Major roles in the establishment of the IAEA and the system of international safeguards.
- The construction of the HIFAR and MOATA research reactors at Lucas Heights.
- The selection of the preferred tender for the construction of the proposed Jervis Bay Nuclear Power Plant.
- The Ranger Uranium Mine joint venture.

Other significant facilities constructed by the Commission at Lucas Heights included a 3MeV Van de Graaff particle accelerator, installed in 1964 to provide proton beams and now upgraded to become ANTARES, a smaller 1.3MeV betatron, and radioisotope production and remote handling facilities associated with HIFAR reactor.

Significant research work included:

- Radiochemistry.
- Neutron diffraction.
- Sodium coolant systems.
- Use of beryllium as a neutron moderator.
- Movement of spheres in a closed-packed lattice.
- Gas centrifuge development.
- Health physics.
- Environmental science.
- Development of synroc.
- Molecular laser isotope separation and support of laser development for atomic vapor laser isotope separation.

== See also ==
- Anti-nuclear movement in Australia
- Australian Energy Producers
- Energy law
- Energy policy of Australia
- Nuclear power in Australia
- Renewable energy in Australia
