= Lucas Heights, New South Wales =

Lucas Heights
- Suburb
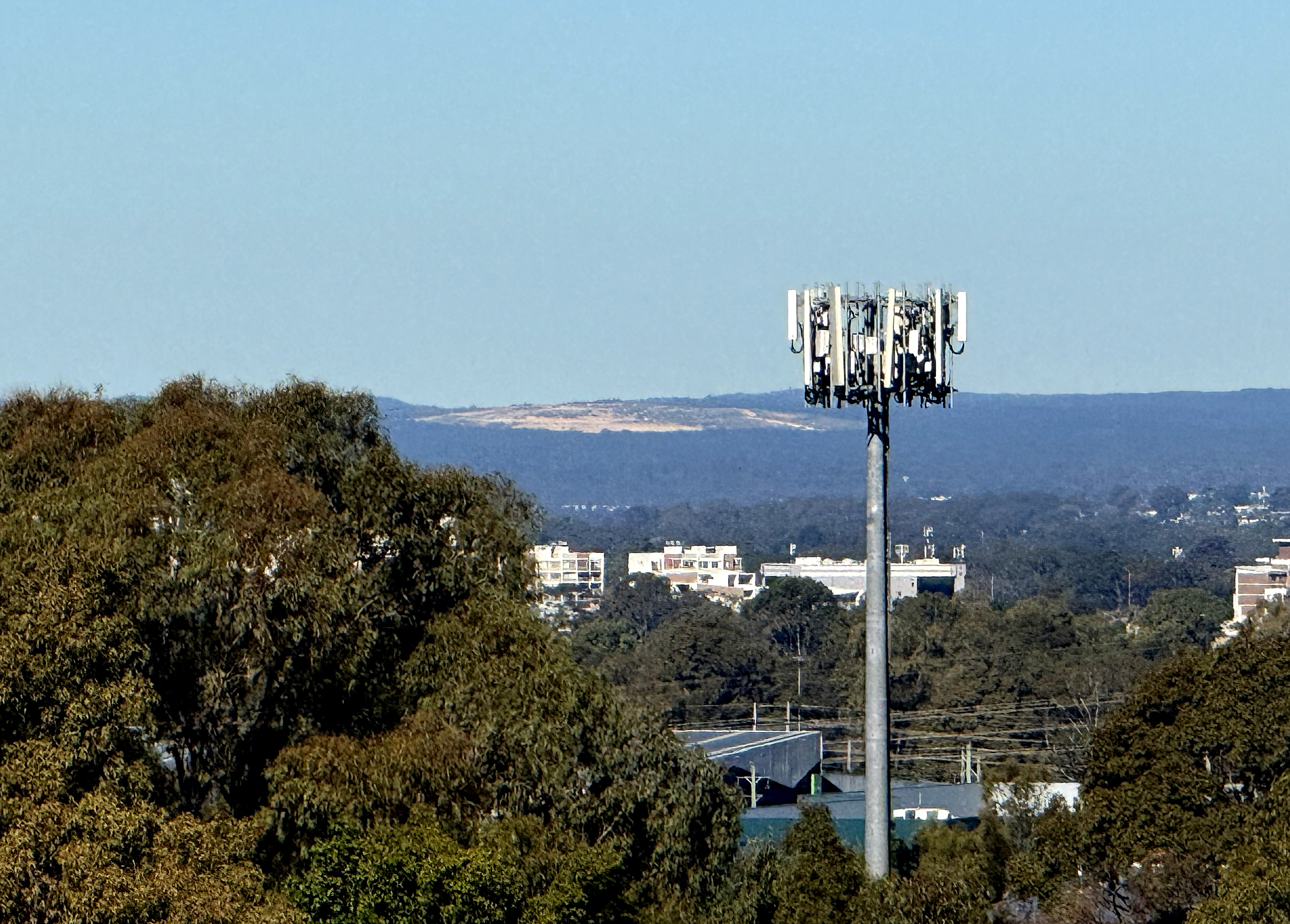
- The hilly sandstone landscape of the suburb, with the LHRRP visible as the yellow patch in the far distance, viewed from Greystanes, with the Fairfield CBD skyline in the centre.

- Interactive map of Lucas Heights
- Country: Australia
- State: New South Wales
- City: Sydney
- LGA: Sutherland Shire
- Location: 31 km (19 mi) south-west of Sydney CBD

Government
  - State electorate: Holsworthy
  - Federal division: Hughes
- Elevation: 151 m (495 ft)

Population
  - Total: 4 (SAL 2021)
- Postcode: 2234
Suburbs around Lucas Heights
Bangor	Barden Ridge	Woronora
Holsworthy	Lucas Heights	Woronora Heights
Engadine	Yarrawarrah	Loftus

Lucas Heights is a suburb in southern Sydney, in the state of New South Wales, Australia. It is near to the Royal National Park.

== History ==
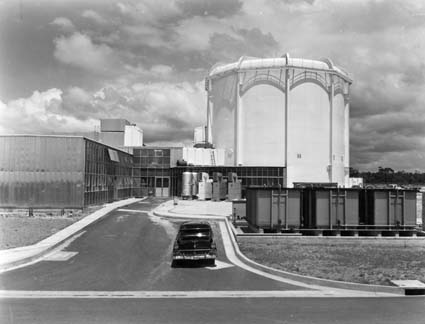
HIFAR reactor at Lucas Heights, c.1958

Lucas Heights was named after John Lucas Senior, a flour miller who in 1823 was granted 150 acres (0.6 km^{2}) on the 'head of unnamed stream into Georges River'. He built a water-driven mill for grinding corn from the Illawarra farms. Small ships sailed up the coast into Botany Bay, Georges River and the Woronora River.

== Geography ==
It is located 31 kilometres south-west of the Sydney central business district, in the local government area of the Sutherland Shire. Lucas Heights is located on the Woronora River, which flows north into the Georges River.

Unusually for a suburb, Lucas Heights does not contain a residential area. The residential area previously part of Lucas Heights was renamed Barden Ridge in 1996 to increase the real estate value of the area, as it would no longer be instantly associated with the High Flux Australian Reactor (HIFAR).

The suburb contains the Lucas Heights Conservation Area, a 111.7-hectare (276-acre) bushland reserve. The conservation area protects native woodland, heath, and sedgeland within the Mill Creek catchment.

== Commercial areas ==
Lucas Heights has become notable as the site of the Australian Nuclear Science and Technology Organisation’s (ANSTO) main research establishment, originally built by the Australian Atomic Energy Commission and home to the historic HIFAR research reactor.

HIFAR was shut down in January 2007 and superseded by the OPAL research reactor. OPAL consists of leading neutron radiation facilities and attracts international scientists as its staff members and many hundreds of third-party users. In 2005, Australian police suggested the HIFAR reactor was a possible target for a foiled terrorist bomb attack.

Spent fuel from the OPAL research reactor is transported to Port Kembla, then exported to France for reprocessing.

The non-governmental Australian Institute of Nuclear Science and Engineering (AINSE) also has its headquarters at Lucas Heights.

Lucas Heights also hosts a (non-nuclear) waste management facility called the Lucas Heights Resource Recovery Park, which was for many years a major disposal site for sanitary carters.

== Climate ==
Due to its elevation, Lucas Heights is one of the few places in Sydney that has a borderline Oceanic (Cfb) and a Humid subtropical climate (Cfa).

Climate data for Lucas Heights
Month	Jan	Feb	Mar	Apr	May	Jun	Jul	Aug	Sep	Oct	Nov	Dec	Year
Record high °C (°F)	41.2 (106.2)	42.0 (107.6)	39.8 (103.6)	32.4 (90.3)	26.9 (80.4)	23.5 (74.3)	24.0 (75.2)	28.0 (82.4)	34.4 (93.9)	34.0 (93.2)	41.5 (106.7)	40.0 (104.0)	42.0 (107.6)
Mean daily maximum °C (°F)	25.9 (78.6)	26.0 (78.8)	24.7 (76.5)	22.3 (72.1)	18.9 (66.0)	16.2 (61.2)	15.8 (60.4)	17.2 (63.0)	19.5 (67.1)	21.6 (70.9)	23.4 (74.1)	25.7 (78.3)	21.4 (70.5)
Mean daily minimum °C (°F)	17.4 (63.3)	17.6 (63.7)	16.1 (61.0)	13.3 (55.9)	10.1 (50.2)	8.2 (46.8)	6.6 (43.9)	7.4 (45.3)	9.4 (48.9)	11.9 (53.4)	13.7 (56.7)	15.9 (60.6)	12.3 (54.1)
Record low °C (°F)	10.9 (51.6)	11.1 (52.0)	8.4 (47.1)	5.6 (42.1)	4.3 (39.7)	−0.5 (31.1)	−0.6 (30.9)	1.6 (34.9)	3.1 (37.6)	3.5 (38.3)	6.8 (44.2)	8.8 (47.8)	−0.6 (30.9)
Average precipitation mm (inches)	92.5 (3.64)	104.1 (4.10)	119.0 (4.69)	92.0 (3.62)	79.9 (3.15)	101.0 (3.98)	59.6 (2.35)	67.6 (2.66)	51.8 (2.04)	70.2 (2.76)	92.9 (3.66)	77.9 (3.07)	1,007.6 (39.67)
Average precipitation days (≥ 0.2 mm)	10.9	11.1	11.8	9.6	9.4	9.8	7.7	7.6	7.9	9.8	10.9	10.0	116.5
Average relative humidity (%)	62	63	63	58	58	61	52	51	52	57	57	57	57
