= Braggs =

Braggs can refer to:

- Glenn Braggs (born 1962), American former Major League Baseball player
- Torraye Braggs (born 1976), American basketball player
- Braggs, Oklahoma, United States, a town
- Braggs, a former chain of bakers based in the English Midlands which were merged into Greggs in 1999
