= Paul Bragg =

American alternative health advocate

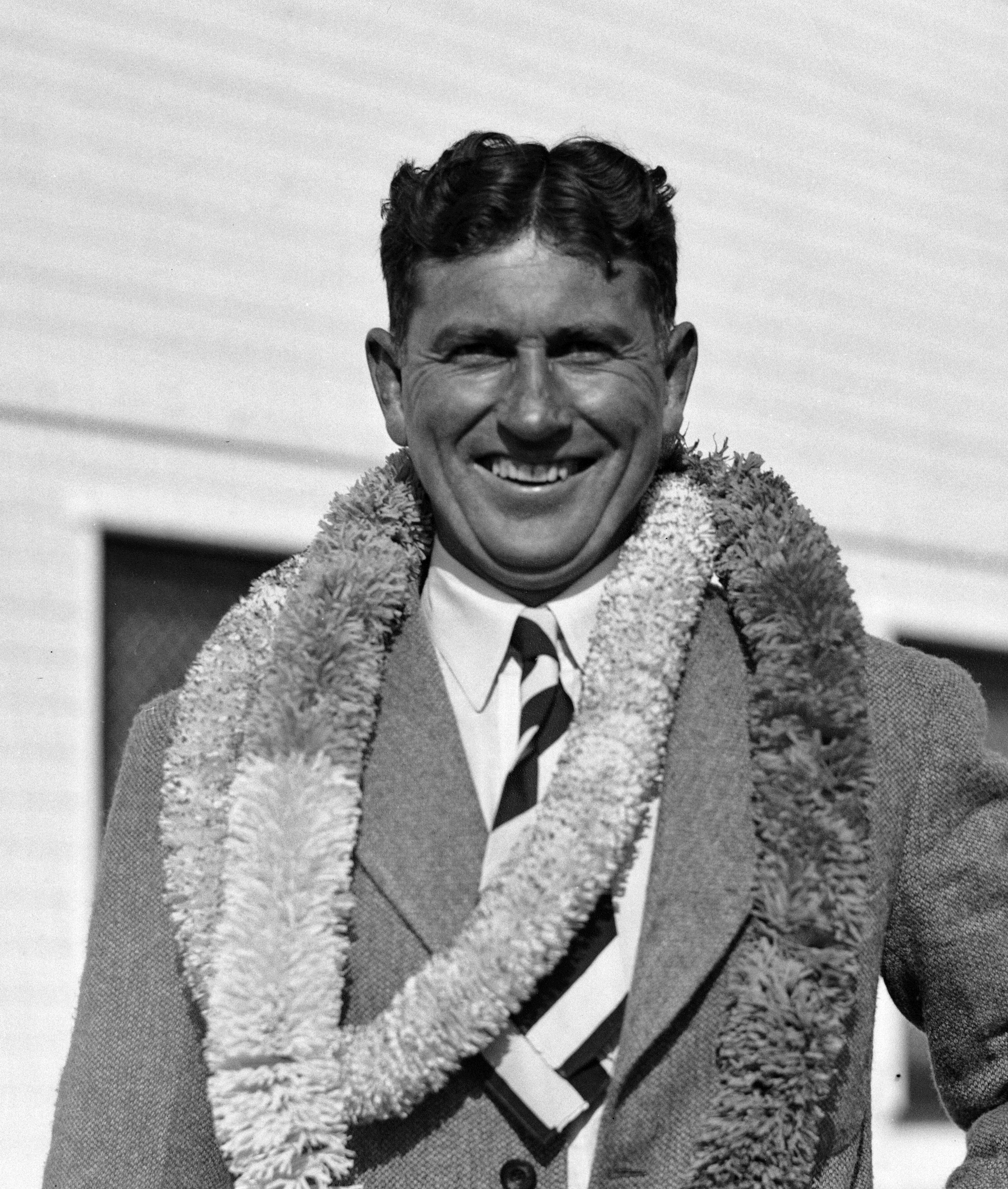
- Bragg in 1932
- Born: February 6, 1895; Batesville, Indiana
- Died: December 7, 1976 (aged 81); Miami Beach, Florida
- Spouses: Neva Parnin (m. 1915; div. 1928) Betty Brownlee (m. 1930; div. 1932)
- Children: 3
- Relatives: Patricia Bragg (daughter-in-law)

Paul Chappuis Bragg (February 6, 1895 – December 7, 1976) was an American alternative health food advocate and physical fitness enthusiast. Bragg's mentor was Bernarr Macfadden. He wrote on subjects such as nutritional detoxification, dieting, fasting, longevity, orthopathy and physical culture. Medical experts criticized Bragg as a food faddist and promoter of quackery.

== Early life ==
Bragg claimed to have been born in 1881 in either Fairfax County, Virginia or Pinkle, Virginia, but genealogical research indicates he was born on February 6, 1895, in Batesville, Indiana, where his father was editor, publisher, and printer of the "Batesville Democratic Herald" newspaper.

Bragg grew up in Washington, D.C., with his parents, Robert Elton Bragg (1866–1944), who had procured a U.S. Civil Service position there, and Caroline (Chappuis) Bragg (1859–1934). He had two brothers, James Elton Bragg and John Harrison Bragg. His father was employed by the U.S. Printing Office. However, in the 1972 Edition of the Bragg Apple Cider Vinegar System booklet, at page 12, and in later editions, Bragg claimed both that his father was "a splendid farmer" and that "I am the oldest of 16 children".

There is no evidence of a sister named "Louise" that Bragg claimed to have tutored to good health in his "Miracle of Fasting" publications, Paul Bragg and his two brothers did have a half brother named "Rufus Albert Chappuis" (1880–1948), from an earlier marriage of their mother, Caroline.

At age 16, it is alleged that Bragg had tuberculosis which was cured at Auguste Rollier's sun sanatorium.

== Career ==
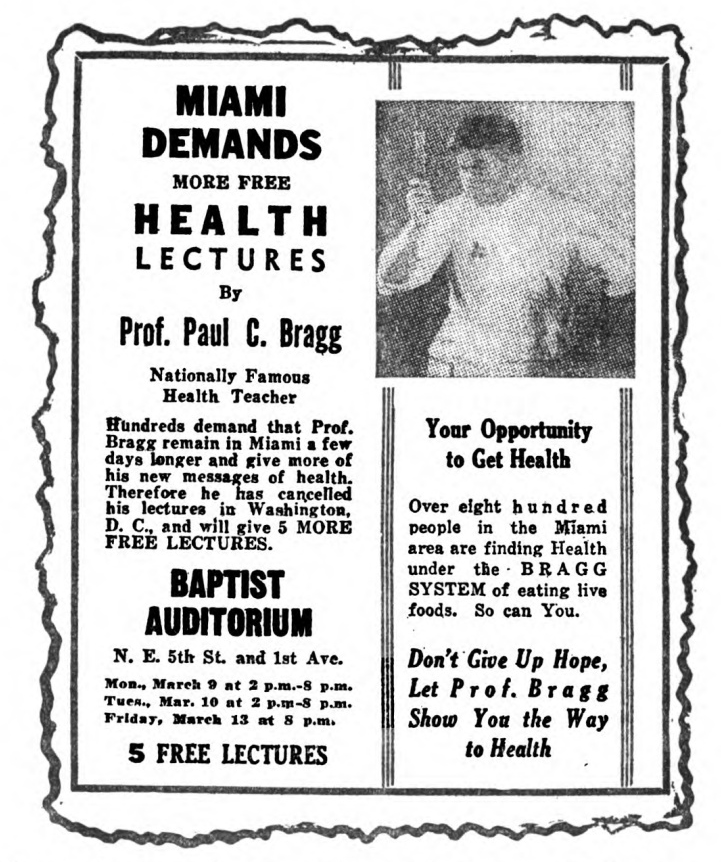
Paul Bragg's health lectures advert

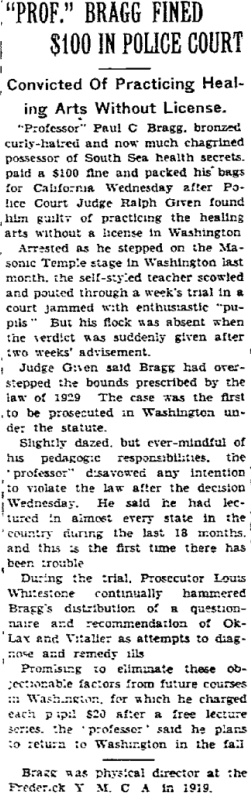
Newspaper clipping, Paul Bragg fined in 1935

At some point, Bragg enlisted with the Washington, D.C., National Guard for "three Years", as is shown on his 1917 Draft Registration, which he filed with the Indianapolis, Indiana draft board that year.

Although Bragg had claimed participation in both the 1908 (London) and 1912 (Stockholm) Olympics as a member of the United States wrestling team, the "Encyclopedia of American Wrestling" (Pub. 1988, Mike Chapman, author) does not show any such person as a member in either year.

In 1915 Bragg married Neva Cecelia Parnin (1897–1988) at the Chapel of St. Barnabas in New York City. They moved to Indianapolis, where Bragg became an agent with The Metropolitan Life Insurance Company.

Several years later, Bragg returned to the East Coast and was employed by various YMCAs and school districts in physical or athletic director capacities, his last known position before moving to California being football coach for the 1920 season at Connersville High School, Connersville, Pennsylvania.

In 1921 Bragg and his family, now also including two young daughters, Neva Pauline/Polly and Lorraine Agnes Bragg (both born in Washington, D.C., on October 14, 1917, and March 10, 1919, respectively), came to California, where Paul was again employed by the YMCA. Son, Robert Elton, was born in Los Angeles County on March 25, 1922. It is unknown how long Bragg stayed with the Los Angeles YMCA, but in 1922 he was in charge of the Physical Education Department at San Luis Obispo High School, and in 1924 he was a physical education teacher at Redondo Union High School, Redondo Beach, California.

Around 1926, Paul Bragg became an entrepreneur in the health field, first by opening an establishment on N. 7th Street, Los Angeles, called "Health Center of Los Angeles" and then, in 1928, "Bragg Health Center" on South Hill Street, Los Angeles. To publicize these businesses, he wrote a weekly health column (in the early days they were "advertorials") in The Los Angeles Times from 1926 to 1928 which he sometimes called "Newslets" and other times "Health Notes". The health services that business endeavors offered are described in the advertorials and columns.

In September 1928, Paul and Neva Bragg divorced, and in the 1930 U.S. Census, Neva and her new husband, August Busch, were shown living with the three Bragg children in Los Angeles, California.

1929 was the beginning of Paul Bragg's health lecture tours where he went to various American cities (San Antonio & Dallas, Texas in 1929; San Francisco & Oakland, California and Denver, Colorado in 1930), rented a facility, advertised heavily, then gave a series of lectures—usually over a period of five or six consecutive evenings. His lectures were free, but he did charge a fee for post-lecture private consultation. ($20 circa 1935—approximately $343 in 2015 dollars per CPI calculation—according to testimony in a Maryland court case against him).

1929 was also the copyright year of the first health book attributed to Bragg as author, Cure Yourself. Since book stores or book departments in retail stores in that era were usually only accessible in the more highly populated areas, another purpose of Bragg's lecture tours was most likely to promote and sell his books.

Bragg married Gertrude Elizabeth Brownlee (born July 6, 1902, Eau Claire, Wisconsin) on February 17, 1930, in Clearwater, Florida. Brownlee was an Advance Manager for the Bragg lectures. On their Florida marriage license application, Bragg stated his age as 49, his residence as Hollywood, California, and his birthplace as Pinkle, Virginia. Paul Bragg and Gertrude Elizabeth Brownlee Bragg were divorced in January 1932 in Los Angeles County, California. Paul Bragg never remarried.

In October 1930, Bragg was sued in Federal Court/San Francisco by St. Louis Estes, a Los Angeles-area raw food health lecturer/manufacturer, charging copyright infringement, stating "A 1929 publication of Bragg is a rearrangement of material in an earlier book on raw food written by Estes." The outcome of this lawsuit is unknown.

Bragg gave health lectures at churches. In 1934, Betty Thompson, an 18-year-old church musician in Bakersfield, California, testified in Superior Court that Bragg had attacked her in April, 1932. She sued Bragg for damages of $100,000.

Burbank, California city directories of the time reflect his residence in that city from 1935 to 1954, and that his food manufacturing company, Live Food Products, Inc., later Bragg Live Foods, Inc., was also located there during that period. Subsequently, he relocated to Desert Hot Springs, California, and later in the 1960s, at least part-time, to Hawaii.

== Education claims ==
On October 8, 1914, Washington, D.C.'s Evening Star newspaper reported that Paul C. Bragg was appointed to the student staff of The Balance Sheet, a newly planned newspaper of that city's "Business High School", as its "Athletic Editor".

The 1940 Federal Census showed him living on National Avenue in Burbank, California, gave his age as "45", and noted that the highest attained academic grade for him as "H1", which would be only one year of high school.

Although Bragg claimed advanced scientific degrees in newspaper and magazine interviews — including his 1975 People article — there is no documentation to back up these claims. In some booklets he published, such as "Bragg Apple Cider Vinegar System" (Thirteenth Printing 1972) and "Building Powerful Nerve Force..." (Fifth Printing 1973), he used the titles "N.D." and "Ph.T", but not "Ph.D". A 1977 publication Bragg co-authored with Patricia Bragg, titled The Shocking Truth about Water, appended the titles of N.D. and Ph.D. behind his name.

Currently, no books authored by Bragg refer to any specific educational accomplishments.

== Business ==
Patricia Bragg, Bragg's former daughter-in-law, according to official records, has since taken over Bragg's health business, having previously married (and later divorced) Bragg's son, Robert Elton Bragg. She has stated that she was legally adopted by Paul. The company they started and ran, Bragg Live Food Products, Inc. was sold to an investment group led by Swander Pace Capital in 2019, and Patricia Bragg is no longer associated with the company. The new ownership continues to sell the products it is known for, such as liquid aminos and apple cider vinegar.

== Health beliefs ==
Bragg advocated using deep breathing, fasting, organic foods, drinking distilled water, juicing, exercise, listening to one's body, and many other techniques as methods of prolonging lifespan. Bragg was not a vegetarian, but ate a mostly pescatarian diet which included fresh fish, fresh fruits, fresh vegetables and raw milk.

Medical experts criticized Bragg as a food faddist and promoter of quackery.

In 1931, the Bureau of Investigation of the American Medical Association (AMA) issued an article on Bragg which stated that he was a "food faddist and sexual rejuvenator debarred from the mails." Arthur J. Cramp of the AMA dismissed Bragg as a "charlatan". Bragg held pseudoscientific views about dieting and disease. He stated that tonsillitis is the result of people eating "mucus forming foods", cancer is caused by "gooey, slimy foods" and that colds are caused by the consumption of white bread or ice cream. Bragg firmly opposed the use of white bread and white flour and sold a substitute for each.

Bragg was criticized for his involvement in "mail-order quackery". He advertised a patent medicine called "Glantex" which he said could make people feel twenty years younger. In December, 1930 after a hearing the Postmaster General issued a fraud order against Bragg and his health center. He got around this by advertising himself as "Paul Chappuis".

In June 1932, ten dozen packages of Bragg's O.K.-Lax were seized. The product was misbranded with false and fraudulent curative effects. Bragg advertised O.K.-Lax as a "miracle substance" that cleanses the intestines and cures asthma, catarrh, and diabetes. An analysis of a sample by the United States Department of Agriculture revealed the product was made from ground leaves, bark, roots, fruit, and a laxative drug. In February 1933, the court ordered the packages to be destroyed by the United States marshal.

In March 1935, Washington, D.C., officials arrested and charged Bragg with practicing healing art without a license. He was fined $100.

Bragg was known to have misbranded his food products with false health claims. His products were investigated by the Food and Drug Administration and Federal Trade Commission. He advertised "Bragg's Grass Tablets" as being rich in Vitamin A, promoting health, and preventing sickness. In October 1941, Bragg agreed not to publish any further health claims about the product. The FDA reported in 1967 that Bragg's papaya tablets and other dietary tablets "contained false and misleading therapeutic claims and lacked adequate directions for use for the purposes attended."

Bragg was an anti-vaccinationist. He argued that vaccines are deadly and recommended that people not take them.

== Death ==
In 1972 at age 77, Bragg claimed incorrectly to be 91 years of age. This led to various books mistakenly reporting Bragg to have died in his 90s.

Bragg died of a heart attack in the emergency room of South Shore Hospital in Miami, Florida on December 7, 1976. He was 81 years old. Patricia Bragg reported that Bragg "was injured by a wave in the surf six months ago and his health began to decline after the accident". Bragg was cremated on December 10, 1976, by the Lithgow Funeral Center, Miami. A memorial service was held in Hawaii and "participants brought flowers to scatter with Mr. Bragg's ashes in the Ft. DeRussey Beach waters off Waikiki."

== Legacy ==
Jack LaLanne, the original "TV Fitness King", said that "Bragg saved my life at age 15 when I attended the Bragg Crusade in Oakland, California". This would have been circa 1929.

Bragg was the inspiration and personal health and fitness adviser to several Olympic athletes: Murray Rose, Betty Cuthbert of Australia, his relative Don Bragg (pole-vaulter), and others.

== Selected publications ==
- The Truth About Sex (1929)
- Cure Yourself (1929)
- Live Food Cook Book and Menus (1930)
- Paul C. Bragg's Personal Health Food Cook Book and Menus (1935)
- The Bragg Toxicless Diet Body Purification and Healing System (1967)
- How to Keep the Heart Healthy and Fit (1968)
- Building Powerful Nerve Force (1969)
- The Shocking Truth About Water: A Universal Fluid of Death (1970)
- Bragg Apple Cider Vinegar System (1972)
- Paul C. Bragg's Four Generation Health Food Cook Book and Menus (1972)
- The Miracle of Fasting (1972)
- Your Hair and Your Health (1972)
- Hi-Protein Meatless Health Recipes (1978)
