= High Flux Australian Reactor =

Australia's first nuclear reactor

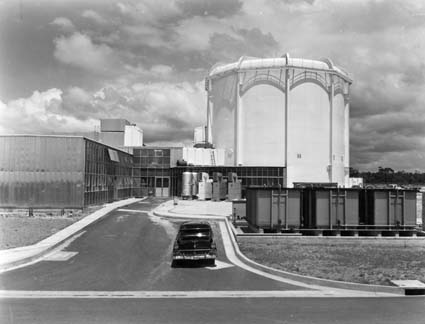
- HIFAR at Lucas Heights, 1958
- Reactor concept: Heavy-water
- Status: Commissioned, 1958; Decommissioned, 2007
- Location: Lucas Heights, Sydney
- Coordinates: 34°03′06″S 150°58′50″E

Main parameters of the reactor core
- Fuel (fissile material): ^{235}U
- Fuel state: Solid
- Neutron energy spectrum: Thermal
- Primary moderator: Heavy water
- Primary coolant: Liquid (heavy water, D_{2}O)

Reactor usage
- Primary use: Neutron diffraction; Radioisotope production
- Power (thermal): 10MW_{thermal}
- Website: www.ansto.gov.au

The High Flux Australian Reactor (HIFAR) was Australia's first nuclear research reactor. It was built at the Australian Atomic Energy Commission (AAEC) research establishment at Lucas Heights, Sydney, New South Wales. The reactor was in operation between 1958 and 2007, when it was decommissioned and replaced with the multi-purpose Open-pool Australian lightwater reactor (OPAL), also in Lucas Heights. Both HIFAR and its successor OPAL have been known simply as the Lucas Heights reactor.

== Background and operation ==
Structure of the HIFAR reactor and building

Based on the DIDO reactor at Harwell in the UK, HIFAR was cooled and moderated by heavy water (D_{2}O), and the fuel was enriched uranium. There was also a graphite neutron reflector surrounding the core. Like DIDO, its original purpose was nuclear materials testing, using its high neutron flux to give materials intended for use in nuclear power reactors their entire expected lifetime neutron exposure in a relatively short period.

HIFAR was used for research, particularly neutron diffraction experiments, production of neutron transmutation doped (NTD) silicon, and for production of medical and industrial radioisotopes.

HIFAR went critical at 11:15 pm local time on 26 January 1958, and was first run at full power of 10 MW (thermal) in 1960. The initial fuel was highly enriched uranium, but over the years the enrichment level of new fuel was steadily reduced, in line with international trends designed to reduce the danger of diversion of research reactor fuel for weapons programs. HIFAR completed conversion to low enriched uranium fuel (LEU) in 2006. Of the six DIDO class reactors built including DIDO itself, HIFAR was the last to cease operation. Permanent decommissioning of HIFAR commenced on 30 January 2007 and was expected to be completed by 2025.

In the second half of 2023, a licence application for HIFAR Phase A decommissioning was considered by ARPANSA. Phase A decommissioning means decommissioning of the peripheral plant and equipment associated with the reactor. The Phase B decommissioning, licence to which is to be considered at a later time, means demolition of the reactor containment structure and reactor building, rendering the reactor site a green-field site. The full Phase B decommissioning was expected to be completed by about year 2030.

On 12 August 2006 Open-pool Australian lightwater reactor (OPAL), the 20 MW replacement reactor located on an adjacent site, went critical. OPAL is served by the same complex of research, isotope production and remote handling laboratories. The two reactors ran in parallel for six months while OPAL was being tested. HIFAR was then permanently shut down and OPAL took over HIFAR's role of Australia's only operating nuclear reactor.

== Engineering heritage award ==
The reactor is listed as a National Engineering Landmark by Engineers Australia as part of its Engineering Heritage Recognition Program.

== See also ==
- Nuclear power in Australia
- Nuclear medicine
- Research reactors
