= R v Tang =

- Court: High Court of Australia
- Decided: 28 August 2008
- Citations: [2008] HCA 39, (2008) 237 CLR 1

Case history
- Prior actions: [2007] VSCA 134, (2007) 16 VR 454; [2007] VSCA 144
- Appealed from: Supreme Court of Victoria - Court of Appeal
- Subsequent actions: [2009] VSCA 182, (2009) 23 VR 332

Court membership
- Judges sitting: Gleeson CJ, Gummow, Kirby, Hayne, Heydon, Crennan and Kiefel JJ

Case opinions
- 6:1 the prosecution did not need to prove that Ms Tang knew or believed that the women were slaves

R v Tang is decision of the High Court of Australia.

It is notable as the first criminal conviction for a slavery offence in Australia. The case concerned an appeal the State of Victoria against Wei Tang, the operator of a Melbourne brothel. The case has been described by commentators as 'the most crucial test of the effectiveness of our criminal laws against … slavery ever to come before an Australian court'.

== Facts ==
Tang was convicted in 2006 of 5 counts of intentionally possessing a slave and 5 counts of intentionally exercising a power of ownership over a slave. (Note: Outlawed by section 270.3(1)(a) of the Commonwealth Criminal Code) She was sentenced to 10 years’ imprisonment, with a non-parole period of 6 years. The charges related to five women, all of whom were Thai nationals.

The Victorian Court of Appeal held that the judge's directions to the jury were inadequate, quashed the convictions and ordered that Tang be retried.

The prosecution was given special leave to appeal to the High Court. Tang was given special leave to cross appeal on the meaning and constitutional validity of section 270.3(1)(a) of the Criminal Code.

The majority of the High Court, Gleeson CJ, Gummow, Hayne, Heydon, Crennan and Kiefel JJ, upheld the prosecutions appeal, holding that the prosecution did not need to prove that Ms Tang knew or believed that the women were slaves. Tang's appeal on the meaning and validity of the legislation was dismissed. Kirby J dissented.

The matter was remitted to the Victorian Court of Appeal to consider Tang's appeal against her sentence. The Victorian Court of Appeal upheld her appeal against sentence and Tang was re-sentenced to 9 years’ imprisonment, with a non-parole period of 5 years.
