= Victims Compensation Tribunal =

The Victims Compensation Tribunal of New South Wales is a former tribunal of the Government of New South Wales that was established to determine the amounts that may be awarded to victims of crime for personal injury in New South Wales, a state of Australia. The tribunal had exclusive jurisdiction to determine the amount which the Victims Compensation Fund of New South Wales would pay to a victim of crime. This tribunal was unique in Australia in that it did not notify nominated defendants of tribunal hearings and therefore did not hear evidence that may exist from such persons.

The tribunal's functions were merged into the Administrative Decisions Tribunal of New South Wales in June 2013; which in turn was merged into the newly established New South Wales Civil and Administrative Tribunal, with effect from 1 January 2014.

== Background to the establishment of the tribunal ==
Prior to the establishment of the tribunal, there were two ways victims could obtain compensation for personal injury:

1. They could sue at common law for injuries sustained as the result of a criminal act. All courts which have civil jurisdiction, such as the Supreme Court of New South Wales, the District Court of New South Wales, or the Local Court of New South Wales can hear and determine a claim for personal injury. Under this method both victims and defendants are required to give oral evidence and be cross-examined in order to assess their individual veracity and the true worth of their claim. Strict rules of evidence apply and the claim must be proven on the civil standard, the balance of probabilities; or,
2. Section 437 of the Crimes Act 1900 also allowed a criminal court to make an order for criminal injuries compensation. Under this method Trial Judges who had heard all the evidence during the criminal trial would then turn their mind to the question of compensation. When an order was made, the Director-General of the Department of the Attorney General and of Justice was empowered to make a payment out of government funds to the victim. The Crimes Act also provided that the Attorney General could take steps to recover any payment made from the criminal concerned.

== The first tribunal ==
In 1987, despite objections from the Liberal State Opposition, New South Wales Labor Premier Barrie Unsworth repealed Section 437. In its place, the Victims Compensation Act 1987 (NSW) was passed then given assent on 16 December 1987 to establish a new compensation tribunal for victims. It provided that a magistrate of the Local Court of New South Wales could constitute the tribunal. The first tribunal ceased to exist when the Victims Support and Rehabilitation Act 1996 commenced. The latter act continued the existence of the old tribunal under the new act.

The primary change was the shift to a tariff approach of awarding compensation for injury, replacing the previous discretionary approach. The new scheme appended a schedule listing a range of body party and particular harms to those body party, specifying amounts for each injury depending on their perceived seriousness. The revamped scheme also introduced an approved counseling scheme providing 20 hours of free counseling to victims.

The first tribunal differed to the way the tribunal now works. Applications for compensation were determined by a magistrate. An appeal from the magistrate could be made to the District Court.

== The former tribunal ==
=== Structure ===
The Victims Compensation Tribunal ('VCT') was constituted under section 59 of the Victims Support and Rehabilitation Act 1996 (NSW). It came into existence on 2 April 1997, although transitional arrangements in the act provided that the VCT was a continuation of the former tribunal.

A magistrate could be appointed as a member of the VCT. One of the members could be appointed by the Governor of New South Wales as the Chairperson of the VCT.

Assessors could also be appointed by the Director-General of the Attorney General's Department to determine applications.

=== Procedure ===
A person who claimed to be a victim of crime could make an application for victims compensation to the VCT. Potential recipients of compensation were one, the primary victim; two, the secondary victim and three, family victims. Applications were to be lodged within two years of the alleged act of violence or in the case of a family victim within two years of the death of the primary victim. An application lodged out of time could be accepted if the applicant established there were "good reasons to do so". Leave is usually given in cases of sexual assault, domestic violence or child abuse. Commonly accepted reasons for leave being granted were the age of the victim, the nature of the offence, the impact of the act of violence on the victim and various intervening acts. Simply being unaware of the scheme would not be a sufficient reason for delay.

An application form could be lodged by the victim or a representative, such as a lawyer, caseworker or parent. Once the application was received, if applicable leave would be considered. The claim would then be registered and assigned a reference number. Once registered, the claimant would be invited to file supporting evidence with the VCT. The onus was on the applicant to prove on the balance of probabilities that they were victim to an act of violence, pursuant to section 5 of the Victims Support and Rehabilitation Act 1996 (the 1996 Act). An 'act of violence' is an offence, involving violent conduct, resulting in the death or injury of the victim.

Commonly relied upon evidence would include sworn statutory declarations by the victim and/or witnesses, medical evidence such as counselling reports, hospital notes and Authorised Report Writer (ARW) reports and police evidence. ARW reports were approved to applicants who were claiming to have sustained either a moderate or severe psychological injury. The applicant would undergo an assessment with a clinical psychologist who had not previously treated them. The cost of these reports were born by the Compensation Fund as a disbursement on the claim. Costs for obtaining evidence up to a capped amount could be claimed on each application.

The next phase was the listing of the application for determination. The VCT would allocate a month in which to list the claim to go before an assessor and provide a deadline for the filing of any further evidence and submissions. As the VCT did not require either the alleged victim or the nominated defendant to be brought before it, the assessor dealt with the application in chambers and made a determination on the evidence and materials that were before it. Pursuant to s.29(2) of the 1996 Act, if the VCT accepted that an act of violence had taken place on the civil standard, the balance of probabilities, and that damage had occurred, it then determined the amount of compensation that would be awarded to the victim. Amounts were determined according to the Schedule of Injuries. The Schedule was a comprehensive list of claimable injuries with either a set figure of compensation or a range. The minimum compensation payable was $7,500 and the maximum was $50,000.

Although this body was given the term "Tribunal" by the then NSW Labor government, it does not adopt the adversarial method of fact finding. It has been a government "policy" since its inception in 1989 that the VCT is NOT to notify nominated defendants that an application has been made for compensation in which their name has been provided on the application form as the perpetrator. If the nominated defendant has never been brought before a criminal court, or has been charged but the charges dismissed at Committal, the VCT is not provided with any evidence that such persons may have been able to provide to suggest that an award should not be made. If the nominated defendant has been charged but is found not guilty at trial on the criminal standard, beyond a reasonable doubt, the tribunal will have access to the various court transcripts. However, the Tribunal will not have access to any other evidence that a nominated defendant may have been able to produce. Nor will the Tribunal have the opportunity to visually access the veracity of either the nominated defendant or the alleged victim as neither are required to appear before it. Unlike the normal adversarial methods adopted in common law courts found throughout Australia, the United Kingdom, Canada, the US and New Zealand this policy deliberately excludes evidence that could weigh against the person making the application. In a sense the VCT is "blind" to the existence of such evidence and can only make a decision on the material that is before it.

Was the VCT inquisitorial in nature? Pursuant to s.65A of the "Act" an assessor may "make such inquiries and undertake such investigations as the assessor considers necessary". Given the Attorney-General's policy not to notify nominated defendants it is reasonable to assume that Tribunal assessors do not consider that nominated defendants can provide any evidence of value to the Tribunal. Such procedure has no relationship to the inquisitorial procedure adopted in civil law countries such as found in Europe in which all available evidence is provided to the Court. In France, this collected evidence is called the "Dosier".

=== Appeal ===
Pursuant to s.36 of the 1996 Act an applicant dissatisfied with a determination by an assessor may appeal to a member of the tribunal. The appeal is held in open court and should be made within three months of the initial determination, although an extension is possible under "exceptional circumstances". The applicant and his or her legal representative can attend the hearing and adduce evidence and make submissions. There is also a legal representative for the Victims Compensation Fund who appears to resist the application. The tribunal is not bound by the rules of evidence and can inform itself in such manner as it thinks fit. The hearings are conducted with as little formality and legal technicality and form as the circumstances of the case permit. Without the consent of the Tribunal, publication of identifying details about witnesses, parties and nominated defendants is not permitted.

As with Assessor hearings the nominated defendant is not a party to the proceedings and consequently, is not notified of the appeal. Again, any evidence that the nominated defendant may have in his or her possession to suggest that the award should not be made is not produced to the Tribunal. As with Assessor hearings the Tribunal hearing is "blind" to the potential existence of such material.

At the conclusion of the hearing, the tribunal members makes a decision on the appeal.

Nominated defendants also have no right under the NSW Government Information Access Act (2010), the ''NSW Privacy and Personal Information Act (1989) or the NSW Victims Charter to apply for a copy of any documents including the judgment in which their name was mentioned.

=== Further appeals ===
While an appeal to a member of the tribunal is generally final, pursuant to s.39 of the act there is a right of appeal to the District Court on a point of law. Such an appeal should be lodged within three months of the day the notice of the tribunal was served on the applicant, although further time may be allowed under 'exceptional circumstances'.

== Recovery of compensation awards ==
=== Convicted persons ===
Pursuant to s.46 of the present Act nominated defendants who have been convicted at Trial in the criminal courts or pleaded guilty are required to repay the compensation award to the Victims Compensation Fund. The Director may make a provisional order for restitution against the person so convicted and must cause notice of that provisional order to be served on the convicted person in accordance with the rules. Conviction includes an order under Section 10 of the Crimes (Sentencing Procedure) Act 1999 (formerly section 556A of the Crimes Act 1900) and (except in Part 4) an order made under section 33(1)(b)-(g) of the Children (Criminal Proceedings) Act 1987.

Under the Act convicted persons have the right to appeal against a restitution order from the Tribunal to repay the State the compensation award. The notice of objection must be lodged within 28 days of receipt of the order of recovery. As with the compensation application hearings, these appeals are also heard in chambers, with the Accesor sitting on one side of the desk and the perpetrator sitting on the other side, often with no legal representation. Pursuant to s.46 of the "Act" the Tribunal may confirm a provisional order if satisfied that the defendant has been convicted of an offence arising from substantially the same facts as those constituting the act of violence in respect of which an award of statutory compensation was made. When it confirms a provisional order, the Tribunal may reduce the amount to be paid under the provisional order having regard to:

1. the financial means of the defendant, and
2. such other matters as are in the opinion of the Tribunal relevant to the determination.

Recovery proceedings against convicted persons must be determined in accordance with the rules of evidence and in accordance with the practice and procedure of Local Courts exercising civil jurisdiction in the same way as the determination by a Local Court of an action commenced by way of an ordinary statement of claim within the meaning of the Local Court (Civil Claims) Act 1970 (section 52).

An order for restitution is taken to be a judgment of the Local Court in proceedings on a statement of claim and may be enforced accordingly (section 54).

Pursuant to s.56 of the "Act" the Tribunal on sufficient cause shown may set aside an order for restitution and may stay the execution of judgment pending the determination of any proceedings to set aside the order.

The 1998 amendments to the Act inserted section 46A which enables the Director to issue a provisional order for restitution against a person other than the convicted person in circumstances where the person against whom a provisional order for restitution had been made under section 46 had disposed of property as part of a scheme for the purpose of avoiding a liability (whether actual or potential) under the Act. See section 49(2A) as to the confirmation of a provisional order made under section 46A.

=== Unconvicted persons ===
Statutory compensation may be paid to victims of an act of violence in circumstances where there is no identifiable offender, where the charge against the alleged offender is dismissed or found not guilty at trial. In those cases where the offender is either unidentified or criminal proceedings have resulted in acquittal or dismissal, payments of statutory compensation cannot be the subject of restitution action.

== Criticism ==
Peter Breen, a former independent Member of the New South Wales Legislative Council and a solicitor of the NSW Supreme Court, made accusations of false applications on the tribunal in the NSW Parliament. Further complaints to this effect were made by Senator Bill Heffernan then Federal Parliamentary Secretary to Cabinet, Roseanne Catt, and the late John Marsden.

It was argued that as the tribunal did not provide an opportunity for the alleged perpetrator to provide evidence and did not hear the alleged victim in person it was inevitable that mistakes would be made. Breen was particularly concerned that in the case of alleged perpetrators who had been found not guilty at trial or who had never been charged, that no proper assessment of their credibility or veracity was made by the compensation assessor. This was due to the policy of Victims Services not to inform alleged perpetrators of a hearing in which their name was put forward by an alleged victim or to require alleged victims to attend the hearing for cross-examination. As alleged perpetrators were not parties to the compensation process, they are unable to provide evidence to the Tribunal that the award should not be made.

In particular, Breen pointed to two inconsistent judgments concerned with claims of sexual abuse made against John Marsden. In Marsden v Amalgamated Television Services Pty Limited, Justice David Levine awarded A$6 million in legal costs and A$0.5 million in damages to Marsden. This was a civil defamation case brought by Marsden against Channel 7 who had aired allegations of child abuse by Marsden. During a two-year period Justice Levine heard evidence in this matter from both Marsden and the alleged victims. In relation to the evidence of one of the alleged victims ("X"), Justice Levine, had this to say. ""X" in the end is a witness in whom I can have no confidence at all as to his veracity. He was a very fragile witness for the defendant to call, as it turned out, on the issue of justification. I do not and cannot, on his evidence, come to the conclusion that more probably than not the events the defendant asserts took place in fact took place. "X was an unbelievable witness". (Marsden v Amalgamated Television Services Pty Limited. "X" had not only labelled Mr Marsden a paedophile, but had also alleged he was a drug lord responsible for smuggling whole shiploads of narcotics into Australia. An Appeal to the NSW Court of Appeal by the Defendant, Channel 7 was dismissed and a cross-appeal by Mr. Marsden for increased damages was upheld.

On 27 October 2000 following the completion of evidence in the Marsden defamation action against Channel 7, but before the judgment, Judge Coorey of the NSW District Court upheld appeals from decisions of the NSW Victims Compensation Tribunal which had the previous December dismissed applications by "X" for compensation. Judge Coorey overturned a decision of Magistrate Jacqueline Milledge, sitting as the Victims Compensation Tribunal and was satisfied on the balance of probabilities that compensable acts of violence by five men, including John Marsden had taken place against "X" and awarded him a grand total of A$142,835 made up of A$100,000 for pain and suffering, A$35,000 for economic loss and another A$7,835 in costs and disbursements. Both decisions were made on the civil standard, the balance of probabilities. Unlike the Supreme Court decision, Judge Correy did not hear any evidence from either John Marsden or "X".

The "X" decision was not the end of the compensation saga for the alleged victims of Marsden. Seven other "discredited" witnesses from the Supreme Court trial also made applications for Victims Compensation. Mr Paul Fraser also commenced a common law action against Mr Marsden on or about 29 May 1997. Despite being successful in overcoming the Limitations Act, Mr Fraser later withdrew his common law action in favour of an application to the NSW Victims Compensation Tribunal. After the Tribunal turned Mr Fraser down he appealed to the NSW District Court. On 6 July 2001 Judge Taylor awarded Mr. Fraser $40,000 in victims compensation, plus $5,078 for psychiatarists' fees and $8000 in legal costs for being sexually assaulted in the 1960s. The Judge however, did NOT find that Marsden had abused anybody, in fact at no stage in the judgment was an offender or alleged offender named. "The word Marsden never appeared". Another alleged victim and discredited witness, John Pearce, informed a Lateline reporter he had lied about Marsden and wished him all the best in the future.

Following the above judgment by Judge Coorey, Breen asked a series of questions of the NSW Attorney-General in relation to the NSW Victims Compensation Tribunal. A response was provided by Michael Egan for the Attorney-Gener;l which explained, "the Tribunal provides a 'non-adversarial, non-court based system' in which the onus is placed 'on the applicant to provide evidence of an act of violence and a compensable injury'. Egan further stated that "it is simply not the case that the allegations made by a claimant are untested" and quoted the evidence which the Tribunal draws upon to make its findings. "The legislation requires that any application for victims compensation must be in the form of a signed affidavit, medical evidence must be provided by the claimant and relevant police and court reports are independently obtained. A major consideration in determining the claim is whether the matter has been reported to the police". Mr. Eagan made no reference to the inconsistent judgments in the Marsden case to which Breen had alluded in his questions.

On 22 November 2006 Breen made the following comments to the NSW Parliament in relation to the passing of the Victims Support and Rehabilitation Amendment Bill:

Similarly, on many occasions the late John Marsden complained about people who were witnesses for Channel 7 in that notorious defamation proceeding, witnesses whom John Marsden did not know from a bar of soap, receiving compensation from the Victims Compensation Authority simply on the basis of a story. The reality of victims compensation in New South Wales is that this is the only jurisdiction in Australia where people can get compensation based on a story. In every other jurisdiction in Australia there needs to be a conviction before a person other than a murder victim, or a person who is claiming as a result of another person's crime, can claim compensation. That issue should have been addressed in this bill.

— The Hon. Peter Breen MLC, in the New South Wales Legislative Council, 22 November 2006

In 2007 Greg Smith, Member for Epping and Shadow Attorney-General in the NSW Parliament asked a series of questions to the Minister for Police. A short reply was provided by the NSW Labor Government that canvassed the current position. Smith later became Attorney-General in the NSW Coalition Government and promised an overall of the Victims Compensation Scheme.

== Financial statistics ==
In December 1997 a Report on the "Long-Term financial Viability of the Tribunal" was completed by the Joint Select Committee on Victims Compensation, Chaired by Mr. Tony Stewart MP. In that report it was stated that: a) a total of A$82.9 million was awarded in Victims Compensation for the years 1995–96 of which a total of $1.86 million was recovered from offenders. b) Outstanding debts to the Fund recorded by the Auditor General at 30 June 1996 totalled A$113.9 million, with a provision for doubtful debts of A$102.9 million.

However, as only 51.2% of all compensation awards for that year were based on a conviction, this means that 48.8% were not based on a conviction.

In the Chairperson's Report for 2007/2008 [32] it was reported that: a) Applications for statutory compensation received during the review period totalled 7031. Assessors determined a total of 4013 claims for compensation. b) A total of A$61 million (statutory compensation awarded by assessors and Tribunal on appeal, professional costs and disbursements) was paid. c) Pending claims have increased from 7297 to 10 241. d) In the year 2004/05, 2887 applications were dismissed in 2005/06, 2210 and, in the year under review, 1383; e) The number of appeals to the Tribunal totalled 639 and 563 were determined. There were 177 appeals pending at the close of the financial year. f) A total of A$3.36 million was collected from convicted offenders during 2007/08 slightly down from the previous year in which A$3.63 million was recovered. g) Since the inception of the statutory scheme in 1988, more than A$41 million has been recovered from convicted offenders. In excess of A$28 million of this amount has been recovered since 2000". h) For the year under review there was a substantial increase in applications received over the previous year – 7031, an increase of nearly 25 per cent. i) Awards for the compensable injury of domestic violence made by compensation assessors totalled 638. Domestic violence is recorded as the offence in 963 claims. There has been a steady rise in the number of claims lodged where the applicant applies for statutory compensation for the compensable injury of domestic violence. j) In the year 2007/08, compensation assessors determined 1044 claims where sexual assault was recorded as the offence. Awards were made in 722 cases. Of the 944 claims for child sexual assault lodged out of time, 142 claims were lodged where the applicant is now aged 41–50 years, 65 claims where the applicant is now 51 to 60 years and 14 claims where the applicant is over 61 years. k) In recent times there has been substantial increase in the number of multiple claims lodged by some applicants – especially where sexual assaults or domestic violence is claimed. At present approximately 1000 victims have multiple compensable claims pending, generally such claims are historic.

In 2013 Howard Brown, a member of the NSW Victims Advisory Board, said the old bill "has been a farce – it is A$300 million in debt".

== Recent developments ==
=== The NSW Civil and Administrative Tribunal ===
In December 2012 the NSW Liberal Government announced that it intended to create a "super-tribunal" to be called the NSW Civil and Administrative Tribunal". The NSW government commissioned a major report into the proposal. This Tribunal will incorporate the functions of twenty-three existing Tribunals, including the NSW Victims Compensation Tribunal. One of the branches of the "Super-Tribunal" will be "Victim Services". The Civil and Administrative Tribunal Act 2013 was passed by the NSW Parliament on 21 February 2013. One prominent member of the NSW Bar said:

"a super-tribunal would more efficiently administer justice than many of the state's smaller tribunals. It would be run better, fairer, more professionally, with less inbred tendencies, less of the quangoism, cronyism and laziness, the club atmosphere, It doesn't do anyone good to have a closed group of 20 men and women who run, and appear before, a tribunal. It's not good for objective justice."
Another critic said "some of the state's tribunals dispensed "Mickey Mouse justice".

=== The Victims Rights and Support Act 2013 ===
The Victims Rights and Support Act 2013 was passed by the NSW Parliament on 30 May 2013. This Bill abolishes the present scheme and the Victims Compensation Tribunal and establish in its place a victim's support division of the Administrative Decisions Tribunal [ADT]. In 2014 this division was transferred to the new NSW Civil and Administrative Tribunal. Features of the new scheme include:

- a statute of limitations for people claiming compensation for violence. Claims for financial assistance must be lodged within two years of the alleged incident or within two years of a child victim turning 18. An application must be made within 10 years of the act or, if the victim was a child when it occurred, within 10 years after they turn 18. Claims in relation to domestic violence must be lodged within 10 years of the incident. However, as a last minute concession made in order to pass the Bill, the government agreed to allow sexual assault complainants who allege they had been assaulted as a child to make application at any time. Also, under transitional provisions (see Retrospectivity below) claims in the backlog of more than 20,000 cases which remain unprocessed by the system (see references below) are only to be processed under the revised legislation. This can be assumed to result in the bulk dismissal of much of the backlog.
- the establishment of a Commissioner of Victims Rights who will also be the chair of the Victims' Advisory Board. The commissioner will be appointed as the head of victims services in the Department of Attorney General and Justice, will oversee the Victims Support Scheme and will otherwise assist victims of crime in exercising their rights.
- Rather than reducing everything to a lump sum compensation payment, the focus of the Victims Support Scheme will instead be on providing a package of practical and financial support that is tailored to victims' individual needs and provided to victims at the time they need it. The schedule of Compensable Injuries under the present scheme will be abolished and in its place will be payments that will be related to the nature of the violent act. Counseling will continue to be provided, but the rates will be increased.
- the following types of support to victims will be provided:

a) 22 hours of counseling which can be extended if appropriate
b) an individually tailored package of up to $5000 to address a victim's immediate needs
c) up to A$8,000 for funeral expenses incurred by family members of homicide victims
d) needs based financial assistance of up to A$30,000 for victims who demonstrate economic loss to aid in their rehabilitation and recovery.
e) a lump sum payment for trauma which will vary according to the nature of the act of violence. A$15,000 for a family member who was financially dependent on a homicide victim; A$7,500 for a parent of a homicide victim but who was not a dependent; A$10,000 for a victim of the most serious kind of sexual assault—one involving serious injury, the use of a weapon or multiple offenders, or for a victim of a series of related acts involving sexual assault, indecent assault or attempted sexual assault involving serious bodily injury; A$5,000 for a victim of a less serious sexual assault, a victim of an attempted sexual assault resulting in serious injury or an assault resulting in grievous bodily harm, including the loss of a foetus, or for a victim of a series of related acts involving the physical assault of a child; and A$1,500 for a victim of an indecent assault, an attempted sexual assault involving violence, a robbery involving violence or an assault not resulting in grievous bodily harm.

Of importance is the fact that this financial assistance will be paid up front rather than victims having to wait for two or three years as under the current scheme.(NSW Parliament, Second Reading Speech, 7 May 2013)

==== Retrospectivity of new law ====
Of minor mention only in public statements so far about the new legislation is that its transitional provisions have the retrospective effect of either completely dismissing or reducing rights of claimants under the old legislation, reported in 2012 as representing °more than 4 years of claims″.

As at 2 June 2013, there were 23,698 pending applications.

==== Moving goalposts ====
Claims which the administration has failed to process since 2009 can now be dismissed in bulk by the application of much shorter time limits introduced in the new legislation, regardless of what laws or time limits, if any, applied when the claims were originally lodged. This in large part may explain why claims are made that the new laws will speed up processing of claims.

The Second Reading speech contained no apology or expression of regret to victims who were previously entitled to claims, had submitted them, had found them inordinately delayed, but are now to have those claims rejected summarily or limited in effect. Some might see this an oversight.

Given the relatively recent emergence of adult victims prepared to discuss or reveal childhood abuse, often only decades after the event, it may be assumed a significant number of old claims to be dismissed will be those related to child abuse victims who have been relatively slow in coming forward. Proportionally few under-28-year-olds are likely to be involved, if any, given that it is only recently that some decades of institutional abuse have emerged, involving hundreds of cases. The relative recency of awareness and disclosure of child abuse cases is one cause cited for the fact that substantiated cases of child abuse notifications doubled throughout Australia in the years between 2001 and 2009, while raw notification figures tripled.

No details appear to be available as to how "up front" payments are to be effectively processed in an area of administration which has a track record of allowing a backlog longer than 4 years to develop and remain.

A complaint has been made to the UN Human Rights Commission by various women's groups against the abolition of the NSW Victims Compensation Scheme

===== Tribunal Procedures =====
Procedures for the new Victims Scheme are very similar to the old scheme.

1. nominated defendants (unconvicted alleged perpetrators) will continue not to be informed that an application has been made for compensation on the basis of their conduct;
2. nominated defendants will therefore not be permitted to provide evidence to the compensation assessors, including both documentary and oral to show that an award should not be made;
3. applicants (alleged victims) will continue not to be required to be cross-examined in relation to their allegations?

These procedures are contrary to the rules of natural justice or procedural fairness which require that nominated defendants be notified of any hearing in which their name is mentioned and that they be given an opportunity to present evidence as to why an award should not be made.[Kioa v West [1985] HCA 81 at 576 and 582 (per Mason J); Haoucher v Minister of State for Immigration and Ethnic Affairs [1990] HCA 22, 169 CLR 648 at 653 (per Deane J);Re Minister for Immigration and Multicultural Affairs; Ex parte Miah [2001] HCA 22; Annetts v McCann (1990) HCA 57 at 598 (per Mason CJ, Deanne and McHuge JJ); Ainsworth v The Criminal Justice Commission (1992) HCA 10 at 571–572 and 574–576 (per Mason CJ, Dawson, Toohey and Gaudron JJ.] This recognises the reputational interest of a person who is at risk of a finding by the Tribunal that they have committed an act of violence. Dr Ian Freckleton SC opined:

"Just as a person's reputation can be adversely affected by findings of fact in a coroner's court, so too can they be by a finding on the balance of probabilities in a crimes compensation forum that a criminal offense has been committed."

— Dr Ian Freckleton SC

The International Covenant on Civil and Political Rights (ICCPR) to which Australia is a signatory also requires governments to honour the following policies:

a) All persons shall be equal before the courts and tribunals: Article 14
b) Everyone shall have the right to recognition everywhere as a person before the law: Article 16
c) There is Right to Privacy, family, home, correspondence, honour and reputation: Article 17
d) All persons are equal before the law and are entitled without any discrimination to the equal protection of the law: Article 26

1. No mechanism will be provided by the Liberal government to allow unconvicted persons to challenge compensation findings over the last 24 years in which their name was submitted as a perpetrator, but which, like the late John Marsden were never notified of the compensation hearing and therefore denied of any opportunity to present evidence as to why the award should not have been made.

Given the extensive review that has taken place in relation to Victims Compensation and the inconsistent result in the Marsden case reviewed above, some may consider the lack of detail in relation to the procedures to be followed by the new scheme as a major oversight.

== Chairpersons ==
- Cecil Brahe (to 2009)
- Magistrate Brian Lulham (to 2013)
