= Pell v The Queen =

2020 judgment of the High Court of Australia

- Court: High Court of Australia
- Full case name: Pell v The Queen [2020] HCA 12

Case history
- Appealed from: Pell v The Queen [2019] VSCA 186

Court membership
- Judges sitting: Kiefel CJ, Gageler, Bell, Keane Nettle, Gordon and Edelman JJ

Pell v The Queen was a High Court of Australia decision that overturned the conviction of Cardinal George Pell for sexual offences against a child. On 22 June 2017, Victoria Police announced Pell's arrest for historical sexual assault charges on two choirboys at St Patrick's Cathedral in Melbourne. The allegations stemmed from Pell's time spent as Archbishop of Melbourne, and pertained to two anonymous victims referred to throughout the court process as victim A and victim B. Victim B died before any allegation was reported to police.

There was a sequence of trials:

- A first trial in the County Court of Victoria failed when the jury was unable to reach a verdict.
- A re-trial in the County Court of Victoria found Pell guilty.
- An appeal to the Victorian Supreme Court of Appeal failed 2 judges to 1.
- Finally an appeal of the Supreme Court appeal, to the High Court of Australia full bench, succeeded, overturning the inferior courts' decisions.

During the County Court trials, Pell pleaded not guilty to all charges. The prosecution alleged he assaulted the victims in the church sacristy and through his choir robes. As the primary evidence in the case was the testimony of A, a key issue in the case was his reliability and credibility. The defence team argued the offence was highly improbable, given the church's layout and number of church attendees. Pell was found guilty by the second jury of sexually penetrating and acting indecently with a child under the age of 16. Pell's appeal of the conviction to the Victorian Supreme Court of Appeal challenged the reasonableness of the conviction. The appeal was dismissed by Chief Justice Ferguson and Justice Maxwell.

The High Court of Australia, the highest court of Australia's legal hierarchy, unanimously overturned the conviction and acquitted Pell. The High Court found the Appeal Court had erred in the legal principles used to evaluate defence evidence, which should have caused them to find necessary reasonable doubt.

Following Pell's release from Barwon Prison on 7 April 2020, there were various reactions. Pope Francis welcomed the decision, Pell maintained his innocence, and the accusers and their families expressed disappointment. Legal experts expressed countering views, with some defending the decision, and others highlighting concerns about judicial discretion and public access to the case as it was underway.

== Background ==
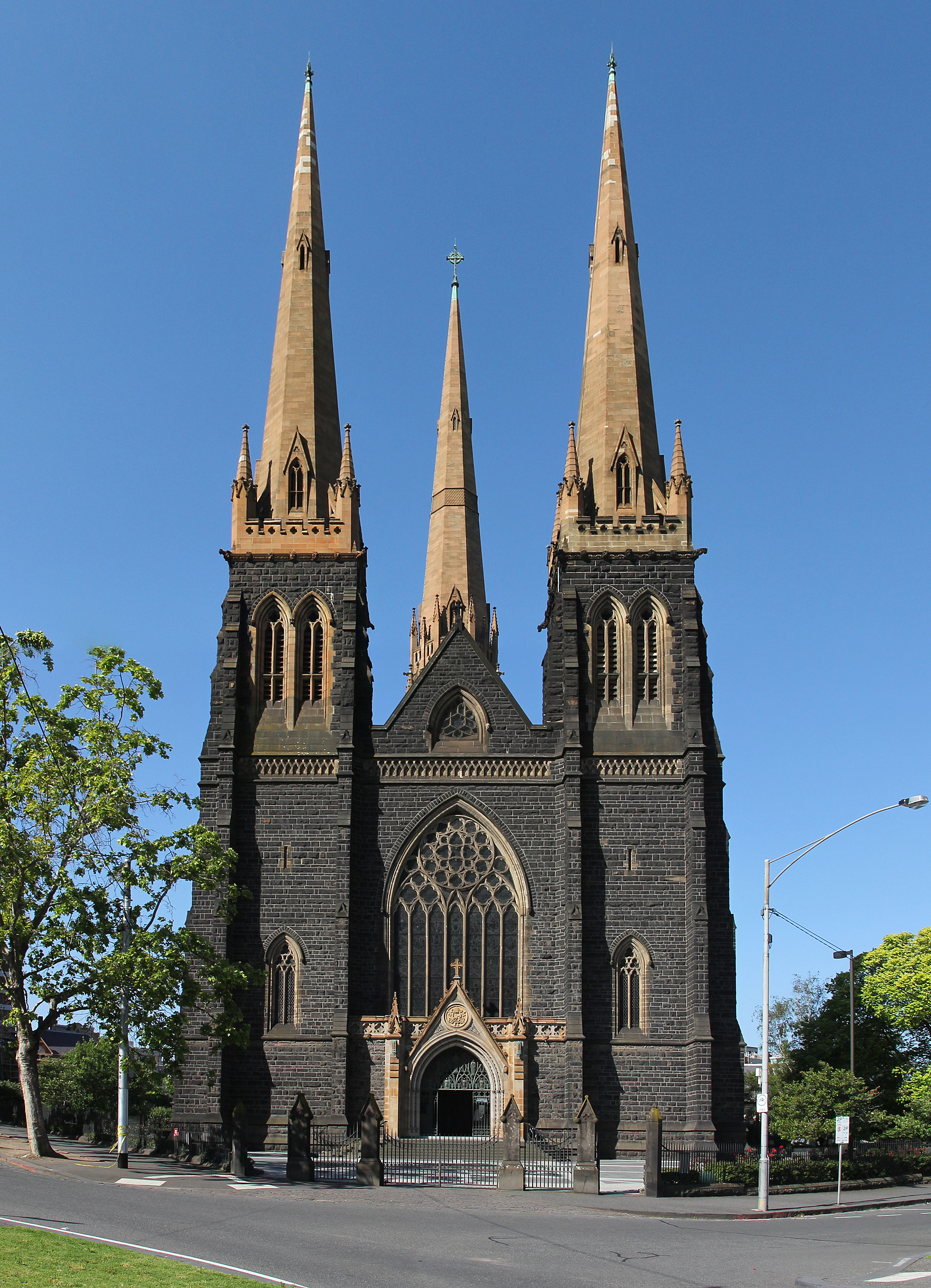
St Patrick's Cathedral, East Melbourne

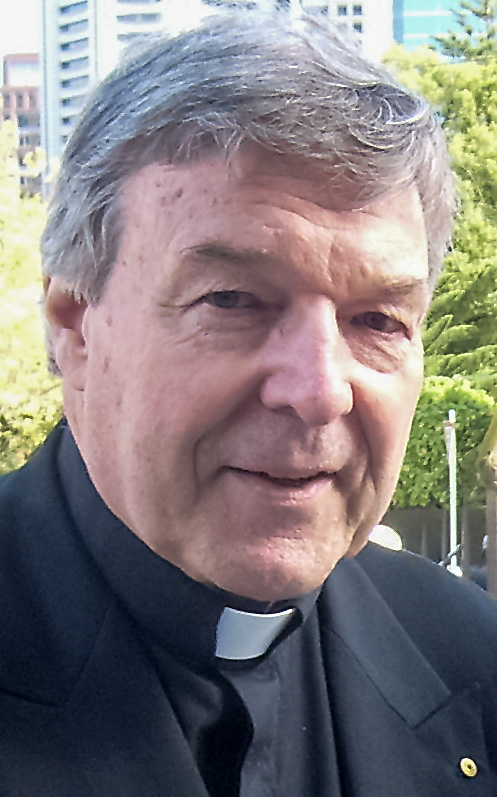
Pell in 2008

On 22 June 2017, Victoria Police announced Pell's arrest charges of historical sexual assault. Pell was accused of sexually assaulting two 13-year-old choirboys after mass at St. Patrick's Cathedral in East Melbourne, shortly after his appointment as Archbishop of Melbourne in 1996. The alleged victims, known as victims 'A' and 'B', remain unnamed. B died before A's allegation was reported to police. Pell was tried twice in the County Court of Victoria and convicted on the second trial. His appeal to the Supreme Court of Appeal was rejected by that court.

=== County Court trials ===
Two trials were conducted at the County Court of Victoria, where Pell pleaded not guilty to all charges. The initial trial ended in September 2018 with a hung jury, as they were unable to reach a unanimous verdict. A second was held in December 2018.

The prosecution alleged that Pell encountered boys A and B drinking wine in the church sacristy. Pell was said to have forced B's head towards his genitalia, and then forced A to fellate him. Pell was then said to have fondled A's genitals while masturbating for five to six minutes. A claimed that about one month later, Pell pushed himself against him and touched A's genitals through his choir robes. B was deceased, and had stated to his mother before his death that he had never been sexually abused while a choirboy, so "the prosecution case was wholly dependent upon the truthfulness and reliability of A's evidence." The key issue argued by the prosecution at the lower trials had been whether A's evidence was reliable or credible; the High Court issue was whether A's evidence should be determinative in the face of unchallenged alibi witnesses.

In both County Court trials, the juries considered several other factors. After mass, boys A and B were part of a strict procession, and Pell's defence team argued it would be impossible for either to leave this procession without being noticed. A witness testified that he introduced Pell to his mother on the steps of the church, which the prosecution conceded if true, meant Pell would not have had the opportunity to commit the sexual abuse of A and B in the first instance. The prosecution though, argued Pell may have been left alone for a short period while church aides tended to other duties.

Pell was represented by Robert Richter, who claimed "only a madman" would sexually assault children in the sacristy after mass given the number of people coming and going from the room. The defence team also argued that the church robe worn by Pell, by nature of its design, would have made it impossible for Pell to expose himself. Questions were also raised as to why the choirboys never informed anyone of what happened until A contacted police in 2015. Judge Kidd informed the juries that many sexual abuse victims do not immediately report the abuse, if ever. The defence team argued Pell could not have conducted the second alleged act of abuse, submitting that someone would have noticed Pell pushing a small child into a wall. The second jury found Pell guilty of all charges.

Subsequent higher courts noted that the prosecutor had acknowledged to the jury "that there were a number of seemingly irreconcilable differences between A's account and the evidence to be given by other prosecution witnesses" and summarized "the prosecution case was that the evidence of the witnesses apart from A left open a realistic possibility that the offending that he described had occurred."

=== Supreme Court appeal ===
Pell appealed to the Victorian Supreme Court of Appeal, that the conviction was unreasonable and that the court should overturn it and find him not guilty of all charges. The appeal was dismissed, with a majority of the court, consisting of Chief Justice Ferguson and Justice Maxwell, finding it was open for the jury to be satisfied beyond a reasonable doubt on the evidence presented that Pell was guilty.

The minority dissenting opinion, by Justice Weinberg, a criminal law specialist and former Commonwealth Director of Public Prosecutions, concluded that the jury ought to have had a reasonable doubt about Pell’s guilt.

== High Court appeal ==
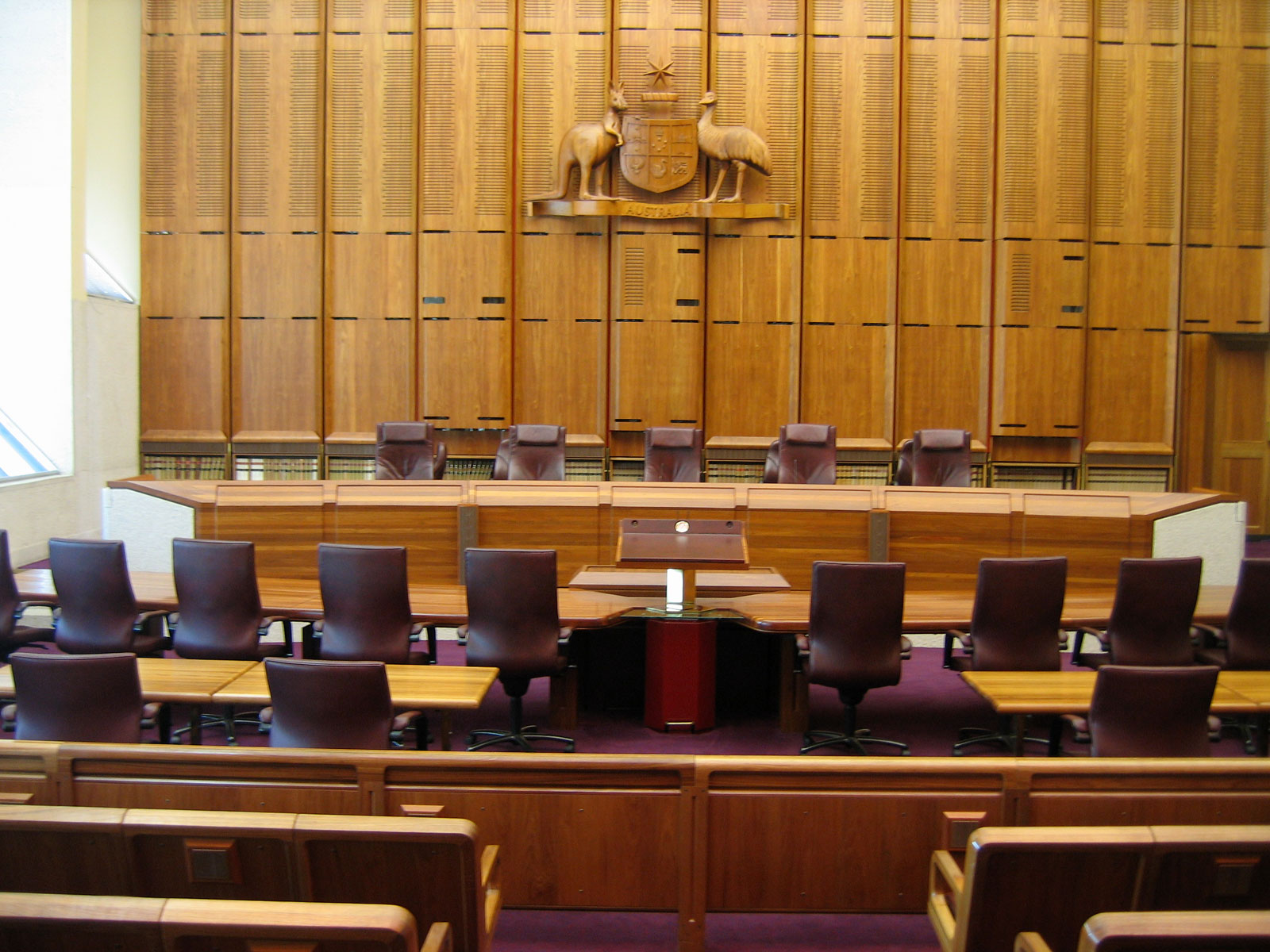
The High Court of Australia

Pell sought permission from the High Court of Australia to appeal the convictions. The High Court can hear appeals from state courts once it grants permission to do so. This permission, known as special leave, is considered based on whether the case involves a significant legal question of public importance or if there is a need to address issues affecting the broader administration of justice. The High Court allowed the appeal without providing a reason for doing so.

Pell's appeal to the High Court contended that the original convictions were unreasonable and lacked sufficient evidence. To succeed, Pell had to prove (that Court of Appeal should have found that the County Court should have found) that as a matter of law the jury necessarily should have doubt in their minds as to whether he committed the acts for which he had been convicted. Pell's defence argued that, based on the totality of the evidence, it was not possible for a jury rationally to find him guilty as accused, and that the majority of the Victorian Court of Appeal had erred in law by upholding the verdict.

Pell's appeal was heard by all seven justices of the High Court, who unanimously allowed (accepted) the appeal and quashed the convictions, acquitting Pell of all charges.

The High Court ruled that, when a court considers an appeal regarding whether a jury verdict is reasonable, it must, by default, assume the alleged victim's evidence as reliable and credible. The High Court emphasised that such a case always proceeds on the assumption that the complainant's evidence is credible and reliable and that the appellate court must examine the record to see whether, notwithstanding that assessment, the court is satisfied that the jury acting rationally ought nonetheless to have entertained a reasonable doubt. To overturn a verdict, that court must then be satisfied that a rational jury would have found there to be a reasonable doubt as to the proof of guilt because of contradictions or deficiencies in the evidence presented at trial.

=== The judgment ===
The High Court found that the Court of Appeal had failed in the legal test they used, and that the evidence could not have removed all reasonable doubt as to Pell's guilt. Certain evidence, particularly about timing, that was unchallenged by the prosecution, required a jury to have doubt.

Instead, the Court of Appeal had applied a too-low bar that had, in effect, flipped the onus of proof: "their Honours' analysis proceeded by asking, in relation to each piece of evidence that was inconsistent with A's account, whether it was nonetheless realistically possible that that account was true." (emphasis added)

The Court of Appeal had "reasoned, with respect to largely unchallenged evidence that was inconsistent with those allegations ..., that notwithstanding each obstacle it remained possible that A's account was correct. The analysis failed to engage with whether, against this body of evidence, it was reasonably possible that A's account was not correct, such that there was a reasonable doubt as to the applicant's guilt.
...the compounding improbabilities caused by the unchallenged evidence...nonetheless required the jury, acting rationally, to have entertained a doubt as to the applicant's guilt."

— High Court of Australia

The High Court instead found that, specifically, to remove reasonable doubt about improbabilities of timing (i.e., opportunity) in the sacristy incident, the Court of Appeal needed to have found that the prosecution had addressed, to the jury, how:

- i) contrary to the applicant's practice and against witnesses, Pell did not stand on the steps of the Cathedral greeting congregants for ten minutes or longer; and
- (ii) contrary to long-standing church practice and against witnesses, Pell returned unaccompanied to the priests' sacristy in his ceremonial vestments; and
- (iii) from the time boy A and boy B re-entered the Cathedral, to the conclusion of the assaults, an interval of some five to six minutes, no other person entered the priests' sacristy, against witnesses saying it was a "hive of activity"; and perhaps how:
- (iv) no persons (e.g., the 6 to 12 altar servers and the concelebrant priests the boys should have passed en route) immediately observed or took action to stop, two robed choristers leaving the procession and going back into the Cathedral.

The decision also considered issues of an appeal court reviewing videotape testimony, and witnesses who are subjectively compelling to juries.

== Reaction ==
On 7 April 2020, Pell was freed from Barwon Prison. Pope Francis, head of the Catholic Church, stated that he "welcomes the High Court's unanimous decision" and that he "has always expressed confidence in the Australian judicial authority". Shortly after Pell's release, Pope Francis held mass, inviting those present to pray for "all those people who suffer unjust sentences resulting from intransigence [against them]". Without mentioning Pell by name, he compared those suffering unjust persecution with Jesus, posting the following to Twitter: "In these days of #Lent, we've been witnessing the persecution that Jesus underwent and how He was judged ferociously, even though He was innocent. Let us #PrayTogether today for all those persons who suffer due to an unjust sentence because of someone had it in for them."

Pell released a statement saying he had "no ill will" toward his accuser and that he had "consistently maintained [his] innocence while suffering from a serious injustice...[which was] remedied...with the High Court's unanimous decision". The father of B was said by his lawyers to be "in shock" and struggling to comprehend the decision. Victoria Police stated it respected the decision and acknowledged the work on the case by investigators.

Associate Professor of Law Andrew Hemming of the University of Southern Queensland defended the High Court's decision to overturn Pell's conviction and called it "predictable". He argued that the case involved "compounding improbabilities", key defence evidence, and a "forensic disadvantage" due to the time lapse. Hemming stated that in his view, the "High Court's decision to quash Pell's convictions was the only outcome consistent with justice".

A lecturer from the same university, Jeremy Patrick, critiqued Hemming's defence of the decision. He considered that Hemming and the High Court placed excessive weight on the witnesses who testified it was practically impossible for Pell to have committed the offences as he was rarely alone after mass. Patrick found the High Court had taken the witness testimony as "gospel", while ignoring possible issues the jury may have had regarding it. Patrick also disagreed with Hemming's support of the High Court finding it was improbable for Pell to have committed the offences, arguing the case should not have discussed what usually happens after ceremonies, or whether altar boys usually sneak into the sacristy. Rather, the jury's role in the case was to evaluate the specific evidence (which Patrick described as compelling), provided by the victim for the instance he testified Pell did have the opportunity to molest him. Patrick argued that applying probabilistic reasoning retrospectively to a unique event was a "fool's errand and an exercise in poor reasoning".

The New York Times viewed the case as illustrating the significant judicial discretion in limiting public oversight and overturning jury verdicts. A suppression order prevented journalists from reporting even basic facts of the case as it occurred. While Pell was initially convicted in 2018, this verdict could not be reported on properly for two months until the suppression order was lifted. Melbourne Law School professor Jason Bosland considers such discretion as prevalent in various aspects of Australian governance.

A second professor from the same law school noted a problem of the case was that "the public mostly couldn't watch". Questions were raised as to whether the public could have been provided access to the case in such a way that the victim's identity remained anonymous. Bosland stated: "The only way the judicial branch of government is held accountable is through principle of open justice, and that requires that the public be given as much information as possible."

== Bibliography ==
Academic and professional literature

- Bonnor, Ann (2020). "A significant possibility that an innocent person has been convicted: 'Pell v the Queen'". Journal of the NSW Bar Association: 28–29. ISSN 0817-0002.
- Buchan, Simon (2023). "The acquittal of Cardinal George Pell". Law Society Journal.
- Dyer, Andrew; Hamer, David (2020). "He 'Came Across as Someone Who Was Telling the Truth': Pell v The Queen". Sydney Law Review. 42 (1): 109–121. ISSN 0082-0512. SSRN 3539938.
- Hemming, Andrew (2022). "Why the Jury in Pell v The Queen Must Have Had a Doubt and the High Court was Right to Quash the Guilty Verdicts". Australian Journal of Law and Religion. 1 (1): 57–75. doi:10.55803/M39F – via University of Southern Queensland.
- Patrick, Jeremy (2023). "Respect for juries: A rejoinder to Hemming on Pell". Alternative Law Journal. 48 (2): 116–119. doi:10.1177/1037969X231159431. ISSN 1037-969X.
- Silbert, Gavin (2020). "Pell v The Queen". Victorian Bar News: 36–38. ISSN 0159-3285.
- Stackpoole, Christopher (2020). "Special leave to a pell: 'Pell v The Queen'". The Proctor: 14–18. ISSN 1321-8794.
- Sullivan, Emma (2019). "A Majority Of The Victorian Court Of Appeal Uphold Cardinal Pell's Conviction For Child Sexual Assault Offences". Journal of the NSW Bar Association: 22–23. ISSN 0817-0002.

News articles

- Albeck-Ripka, Livia; Cave, Damien (25 February 2019). "Cardinal George Pell of Australia Convicted of Sexually Abusing Boys in 1996". The New York Times. ISSN 1553-8095.
- Albeck-Ripka, Livia; Cave, Damien (7 April 2020). "Cardinal Pell's Acquittal Was as Opaque as His Sexual Abuse Trial". The New York Times. ISSN 1553-8095. Archived from the original on 12 January 2023.
- Cooper, Adam (26 February 2019). "The case for and against: What the jury was told in George Pell's trial". The Age. ISSN 0312-6307.
- Le Grand, Chip (2020). "Pell to walk free after High Court overturns conviction". The Sydney Morning Herald. ISSN 0312-6315.
- McKenna, Kate (7 April 2020). "George Pell freed from prison after High Court quashes child sex abuse convictions". ABC News.
- Zauzmer, Julie (28 June 2017). "Top-ranking Vatican cardinal charged with sex offenses in Australia". Washington Post. ISSN 0190-8286.
