= Roche v Kronheimer =

- Court: High Court of Australia
- Decided: 23 March 1921 (decision announced); 2 June 1921 (reasons delivered)
- Citations: [1921] HCA 25, (1921) 29 CLR 329

Court membership
- Judges sitting: Knox CJ, Higgins, Gavan Duffy, Rich and Starke JJ

Case opinions
- (5:0) the Treaty of Peace Act and the Treaty of Peace Regulations made under the Act were valid under the defence power (1:0) the Act and regulations were also valid under the external affairs power per Higgins J

Roche v Kronheimer is an early case in which the High Court considered the defence power and external affairs power of the Commonwealth under the Australian Constitution and the Parliament's power to delegate certain legislative powers to the Executive. The Court concluded that Federal Parliament had the power to implement the Treaty of Versailles under the defence power and to delegate that implementation to the Governor-General. Higgins J also saw it as a valid exercise of the external affair power.

== Background ==
The Treaty of Versailles was signed for Australia by the Prime Minister W M Hughes and Minister for the Navy Joseph Cook 28 June 1919. The Parliament passed the Treaty of Peace Act 1919 to give the Government power to give effect to the treaty. The Act consisted of just one page and the operative terms were that:

2. The Governor-General may make such regulations and do such things as appear to him to be necessary for carrying out and giving effect to the provisions of Part X. (Economic Clauses) of the said Treaty.

3. The regulations may provide for the punishment of offences against the regulations, by the impositions of the following penalties :-

(a) If the offence is prosecuted summarily-a fine not exceeding Five hundred pounds or imprisonment for any term not exceeding twelve months; or both;
(b) If the offence is prosecuted upon indictment-a fine of any amount or imprisonment for not more than seven years, or both

The Governor-General made the Treaty of Peace Regulations, which made extensive provisions, including regulation 20 which set out how the property of German nationals was charged for payments in respect of the claims of British nationals, including subregulation (5) which provided that the Minister for Trade and Customs could make an order vesting the property in the Public Trustee.

Joseph Roche and the other plaintiffs ("the Executors") were the executors of the estate of Joseph Kronheimer, who had died in Victoria in 1914. Max Kronheimer and the other defendants were German nationals who were beneficiaries under the estate ("the German beneficiaries"). The executors asked the Supreme Court of Victoria for advice as to their duties as executors. The German beneficiaries argued that the Treaty of Peace Act 1919 was invalid. Hood J referred the questions to the High Court pursuant to sections 18 and 40A of the Judiciary Act 1903.

Section 51 of the Australian Constitution gives the Commonwealth Parliament the right to legislate with respect to :

"(vi) the naval and military defence of the Commonwealth and of the several States, and the control of the forces to execute and maintain the laws of the Commonwealth"; and
"(xxix) external affairs".

=== Submissions in the High Court ===
The German beneficiaries were represented by Owen Dixon who argued that the defence power did not include a power to make war or to terminate it by a treaty of peace. The external affairs power was limited to matters relating to affairs external to the Australia and did not enable laws to be made as to matters within Australia. The delegation of the legislative power was invalid "Just as the Constitution does not permit the judicial power of the Commonwealth to be vested in any tribunal other than the High Court and other Federal Courts, so the vesting of the legislative power in any other body than Parliament was prohibited." Further regulation 20(5) was invalid as it purported to confer judicial power upon the Minister.

The Executors did not argue in the High Court. Instead the contradictors were the Public Trustee and the Attorney-General (Cth). Sir Robert Garran, the Solicitor-General appeared for the Attorney-General and argued that the Treaty of Versailles was made by the King and as such was binding throughout the British Empire. The defence power included legislating with respect to the termination of war and the Act was also valid under the external affairs power. The Act was a declaration of intention to give effect to Part X of the Treaty of Versailles and the Executive was left to fill in the details.

== The decision of the High Court ==
The Court announced its decision on 23 March 1921 that the Treaty of Peace Act and the Treaty of Peace Regulations made under the Act were valid, and delivered its reasons on 2 June 1921.

=== Knox CJ, Gavan Duffy, Rich and Starke JJ ===
The joint judgement held that it was the intention of the legislature to enable the Governor-General to enforce the provisions of Part X of the Treaty of Versailles within Australia, and, if he thought it necessary for that purpose, to make any of such provisions part of the statute law of Australia. The defence power was not confined to military operations but extends to every measure of defence, including the termination of hostilities by the imposition of terms of peace and the enforcement of those terms. The delegation of power to the Governor-General was consistent with the decision of the High Court in Farey v Burvett. The order of the Minister was not an exercise of judicial power.

=== Higgins J ===
In a separate judgment Higgins J upheld the Act and Regulations under the external affairs power, holding that it was difficult to say what limits (if any) can be placed on the power to legislate as to external affairs. Further the severe punishment of an enemy was valid under the defence power as being reasonably regarded as a deterrent against future attacks. The vesting order was not an exercise of judicial power as it was not the result of a judicial finding as to rights but an order in defiance of admitted rights.

== Significance ==
After his elevation to the High Court, Dixon J said that Roche v Kronheimer decided that:

a statute conferring upon the Executive a power to legislate upon some matter contained within one of the subjects of the legislative power of the Parliament is a law with respect to that subject, and that the distribution of legislative, executive and judicial powers in the Constitution does not operate to restrain the power of the Parliament to make such a law.

The decision continues to be cited for the proposition that the Parliament can delegate legislative power to the Governor-General. Thus in the Tasmanian Dams case, Deane J stated while "a general delegation to the Executive of the legislative power to give effect to the Convention may be thought undesirable, there is strong authority to support the view that it is not, for that reason, beyond power".

The judgment of Higgins J has been identified by the High Court as a significant step in the growth of the external affairs power, supporting the proposition that the external affairs power enabled legislation giving domestic effect to the provisions of an international treaty.

== See also ==
- List of High Court of Australia cases
