= High Court of Australia =

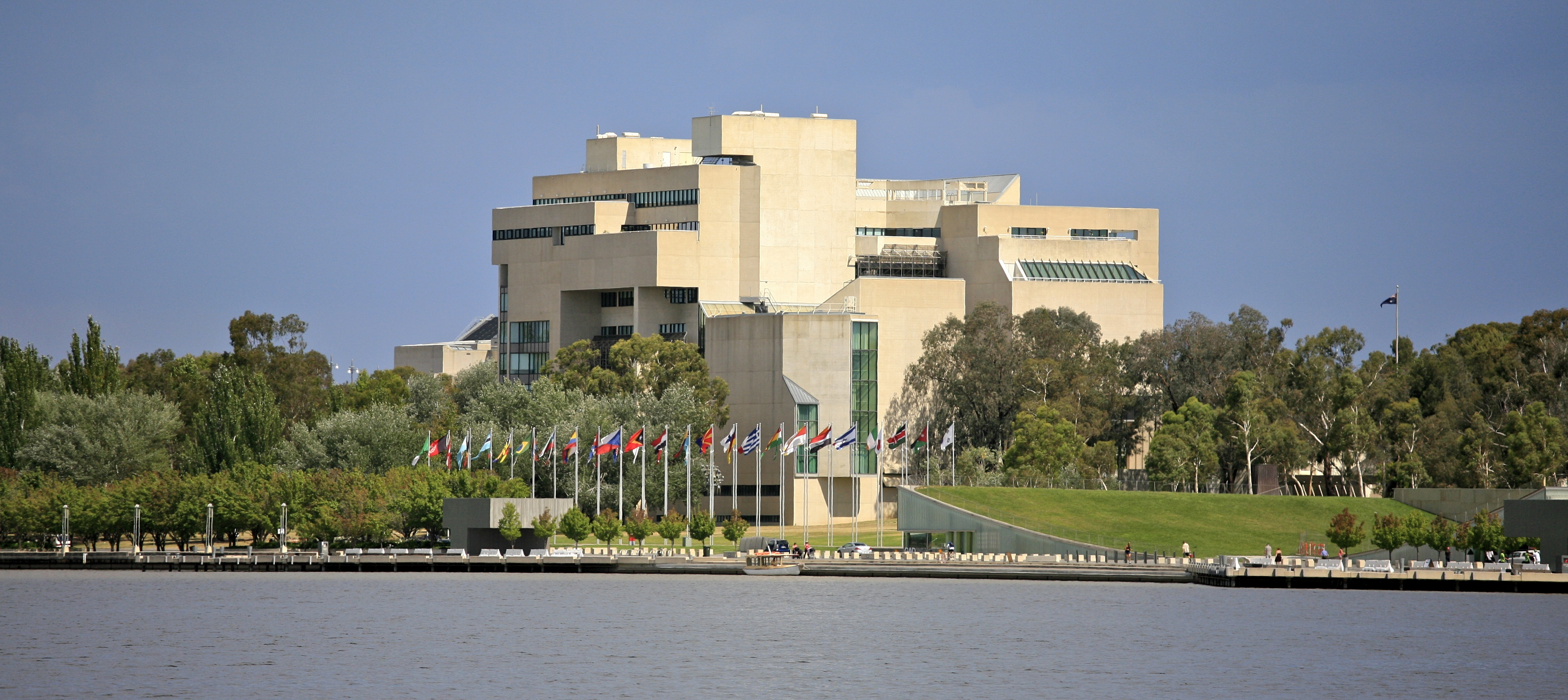
- The High Court building, situated on the shore of Lake Burley Griffin, Canberra
- Interactive map of High Court of Australia
- 35°17′56″S 149°08′09″E
- Established: 25 August 1903
- Jurisdiction: Australia
- Location: Canberra, Australian Capital Territory
- Coordinates: 35°17′56″S 149°08′09″E
- Composition method: Appointed by the governor-general on the advice of the attorney-general following the approval of the prime minister and Cabinet
- Authorised by: Australian Constitution s 71
- Appeals from: State and territory supreme courts (appeal courts or full courts); Federal Court (full court); Federal Circuit and Family Court (full court)
- Judge term length: Mandatory retirement at age 70
- Number of positions: 7, by statute
- Website: www.hcourt.gov.au

Chief Justice of the High Court of Australia
- Currently: Stephen Gageler
- Since: 6 November 2023

The High Court of Australia is the apex court of the Australian legal system. It exercises original and appellate jurisdiction on matters specified in the Constitution of Australia and supplementary legislation.

The High Court was established following the passage of the Judiciary Act 1903 (Cth). Its authority derives from chapter III of the Australian Constitution, which vests it (and other courts the Parliament creates) with the judicial power of the Commonwealth. Its internal processes are governed by the High Court of Australia Act 1979 (Cth).

The court consists of seven justices, including a chief justice, currently Stephen Gageler. Justices of the High Court are appointed by the governor-general on the formal advice of the attorney-general following the approval of the prime minister and Cabinet. They are appointed permanently until their mandatory retirement at age 70, unless they retire earlier.

Typically, the court operates by receiving applications for appeal from parties in a process called special leave. If a party's application is accepted, the court will proceed to a full hearing, usually with oral and written submissions from both parties. After conclusion of the hearing, the result is decided by the court. The special leave process does not apply in situations where the court elects to exercise its original jurisdiction; however, the court typically delegates its original jurisdiction to Australia's inferior courts.

The court has resided in Canberra since 1980, following the construction of a purpose-built High Court building, located in the Parliamentary Triangle and overlooking Lake Burley Griffin.

Sittings of the court previously rotated between state capitals, particularly Melbourne and Sydney, and the court continues to regularly sit outside Canberra.

== Role ==
The High Court exercises both original and appellate jurisdiction.

Sir Owen Dixon said on his swearing in as Chief Justice of Australia in 1952:

The High Court's jurisdiction is divided in its exercise between constitutional and federal cases which loom so largely in the public eye, and the great body of litigation between man and man, or even man and government, which has nothing to do with the Constitution, and which is the principal preoccupation of the court

The broad jurisdiction of the High Court means that it has an important role in Australia's legal system.

=== Original jurisdiction ===
Its original jurisdiction is determined by sections 75 and 76 of Australia's Constitution. Section 75 confers original jurisdiction in all matters:

1. arising under any treaty
2. affecting consuls or other representatives of other countries
3. in which the Commonwealth, or a person suing or being sued on behalf of the Commonwealth, is a party
4. between States, or between residents of different States, or between a State and a resident of another State
5. in which a writ of mandamus or prohibition or an injunction is sought against an officer of the Commonwealth.

Section 76 provides that Parliament may confer original jurisdiction in relation to matters:

1. arising under the constitution or involving its interpretation
2. arising under any laws made by the Parliament
3. of admiralty and maritime jurisdiction
4. relating to the same subject matter claimed under the laws of different states.

Constitutional matters, referred to in section 76(i), were conferred on the High Court by section 30 of the Judiciary Act 1903. While the conferral of constitutional matters might be removed by amending the Judiciary Act, section 75(iii) (suing the Commonwealth) and section 75(iv) (conflicts between states) are broad enough that many constitutional matters would still be within original jurisdiction. The original constitutional jurisdiction of the High Court is now well established; the Australian Law Reform Commission has described the reference to constitutional matters in section 76 rather than in section 75 as "an odd fact of history". The 1998 Constitutional Convention recommended an amendment to the constitution to prevent the possibility of the jurisdiction being removed by Parliament.

The word "matter" in sections 75 and 76 has been understood to mean that the High Court is unable to give advisory opinions.

=== Appellate jurisdiction ===
The court is empowered by section 73 of the Constitution to hear appeals from the supreme courts of the states and territories; as well as any court exercising federal jurisdiction. (Note: Examples of courts exercising federal jurisdiction include the Federal Court of Australia, and the Federal Circuit and Family Court of Australia) It may also hear appeals of decisions made in an exercise of its own original jurisdiction. (Note: e.g. such as a decision made by a single justice of the High Court exercising its original jurisdiction)

The High Court's appellate jurisdiction is limited by the Judiciary Act, which requires special leave to be granted before the hearing of an appeal. Special leave may only be granted where a question of law is raised which is of public importance, involves a conflict between courts or "is in the interests of the administration of justice".

Since November 2023, the High Court has adopted the practice of deciding the majority of special leave applications on the basis of written submissions only. In adopting this practice, the High Court also made the decision to publish decisions in special leave applications on its public website rather than in open court.

=== Appeals to the Judicial Committee of the Privy Council ===
Appeals to the Privy Council in London were a notable controversy when the Constitution was drafted. Section 74 of the Constitution, as it was put to voters, stated that there would be no appeals to the Privy Council in any matter involving the interpretation of the federal or state constitutions. (Note: Excepting for situations in which the controversy involved the interests of some other dominion.)

However, section 74 as enacted by the Imperial Parliament instead only prohibited appeals on constitutional matters when they related to the respective powers of the states and the Commonwealth ("inter se" matters), and even then allowed the High Court discretion to waive the prohibition by certifying cases as being approriate for appeal to the Privy Council. The High Court has used this discretion only once, in 1912, (Note: Colonial Sugar Refining Co Ltd v Attorney-General (Cth) [1912] HCA 94, (1912) 15 CLR 182. The court was equally divided prior to certification being granted.) and in 1985, in Kirmani v Captain Cook Cruises Pty Ltd (No 2), it denied certification and further declared that the discretion was "obsolete", that "such limited purpose as it had has long since been spent", and that it was "impossible to suppose" that the Court would ever use it again.

No certificate was required to appeal constitutional cases not involving inter se matters, such as in the interpretation of section 92 (relating to the freedom of inter-state commerce), and thus the Privy Council regularly heard appeals against High Court decisions. In some cases the Council acknowledged that the Australian common law had developed differently from English law and thus did not apply its own principles. Other times it followed English authority, and overruled decisions of the High Court.

This arrangement led to tensions between the High Court and the Privy Council. In Parker v The Queen (1964), Chief Justice Sir Owen Dixon led a unanimous judgment rejecting the authority of the House of Lords decision in DPP v Smith, writing, "I shall not depart from the law on this matter as we have long since laid it down in this Court and I think that Smith's case should not be used in Australia as authority at all." The Privy Council overturned this by enforcing the UK precedent upon the High Court the following year.

Thirteen High Court judges have heard cases as part of the Privy Council. Sir Isaac Isaacs is the only judge to have sat on an appeal from the High Court, in 1936 after his retirement as Governor-General of Australia. Sir Garfield Barwick insisted on an amendment to Privy Council procedure to allow dissent; however, he exercised that capacity only once in an appeal from Guyana to the Privy Council. The appeals mostly related to decisions from other Commonwealth countries, although they occasionally included appeals from the supreme court of an Australian state.

- Sir Samuel Griffith
- Sir Edmund Barton
- Sir Adrian Knox
- Sir Isaac Isaacs
- Sir George Rich
- Sir Garfield Barwick
- Sir Douglas Menzies
- Sir Alan Taylor
- Sir Frank Kitto
- Sir Edward McTiernan
- Sir Victor Windeyer
- Sir Harry Gibbs
- Sir Ninian Stephen

==== Abolition of Privy Council appeals ====
Section 74 allowed parliament to prevent appeals to the Privy Council. It did so in 1968 with the Privy Council (Limitation of Appeals) Act 1968, which closed off all appeals to the Privy Council in matters involving federal legislation. In 1975, the Privy Council (Appeals from the High Court) Act 1975 closed all routes of appeal from the High Court with the exception of those cases in which High Court issued a certificate of appeal.

In 1986, with the passing of the Australia Acts by both the British and Commonwealth parliaments, appeals to the Privy Council from state supreme courts were closed off, leaving the High Court as the only avenue of appeal. In 2002, Chief Justice Murray Gleeson said that the "combined effect" of the legislation and the announcement in Kirmani "has been that section 74 has become a dead letter, and what remains of section 74 after the legislation limiting appeals to the Privy Council will have no further effect".

=== Appellate jurisdiction for Nauru ===
On 6 September 1976, Australia and Nauru, which was newly-independent from Australia, signed an agreement for the High Court to become Nauru's apex court. (Note: an amendment to Nauru's constitution was made to allow this (section 57)) It was empowered to hear appeals from the Supreme Court of Nauru in both criminal and civil cases, but not constitutional matters. There were a total of five appeals to the High Court under this agreement in the first 40 years of its operation. In 2017, however, this jumped to 13 appeals, most relating to asylum seekers. At the time some legal commentators argued that this appellate jurisdiction sat awkwardly with the High Court's other responsibilities, and ought be renegotiated or repealed. Anomalies included the need to apply Nauruan law and customary practice, and that special leave hearings were not required.

Nauruan politicians (Note: such as the former Justice Minister Matthew Batsiua) had said publicly that the Nauruan government was unhappy about these arrangements. Of particular concern was a decision of the High Court in October 2017, which quashed an increase in sentence imposed upon political protestors by the Supreme Court of Nauru. The High Court had remitted the case to the Supreme Court "differently constituted, for hearing according to law".

On Nauru's 50th anniversary of independence, Baron Waqa declared to parliament that "[s]everance of ties to Australia's highest court is a logical step towards full nationhood and an expression of confidence in Nauru's ability to determine its own destiny". Justice Minister David Adeang said that an additional reason for cutting ties was the cost of appeals to the High Court. Nauru then exercised an option under its agreement with Australia to end its appellate arrangement with 90 days notice. The option was exercised on 12 December 2017 and the High Court's jurisdiction ended on 12 March 2018. The termination did not become publicly known until after the Supreme Court had reheard the case of the protesters and had again imposed increased sentences. In 2022, Australia passed legislation which removed the possibility for reinstatement of the appeal pathway.

== History ==
=== Pre-establishment ===
Following Earl Grey's 1846 proposal to federate the colonies, an 1849 report from the Privy Council suggested a national court be created. In 1856, the Governor of South Australia, Richard MacDonnell, suggested to the Government of South Australia that they consider establishing a court to hear appeals from the Supreme Courts in each colony. In 1860 the South Australian Parliament passed legislation encouraging MacDonnell to put the idea to the other colonies. However, only Victoria considered the proposal.

At a Melbourne inter-colonial conference held in 1870, the idea of an inter-colonial court was again raised. A royal commission was established in Victoria to investigate options for establishing such a court, and a draft bill was put forward. This draft bill, however, completely excluded appeals to the Privy Council, causing a reaction in London which prevented any serious attempt to implement the bill through the British Imperial Parliament.

Another draft bill was proposed in 1880 for the establishment of an Australasian court of appeal. The proposed court would consist of one judge from each of the colonial supreme courts, who would serve one-year terms. (Note: New Zealand, which was at the time also considering joining the Australian colonies in federation, was also to be a participant in the new court.) However, the proposed court allowed for appeals to the Privy Council, which was disliked by some of the colonies, and the bill was abandoned.

==== Constitutional conventions ====
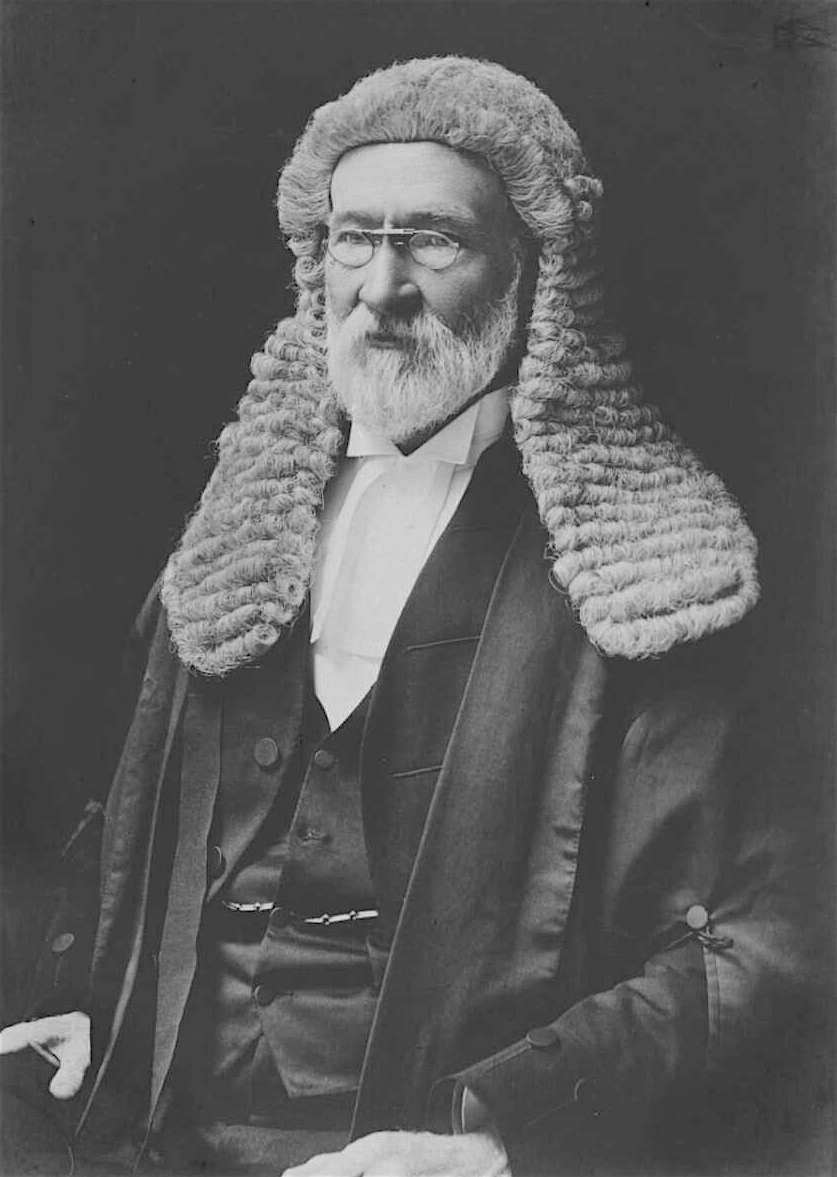
Sir Samuel Griffith, first Chief Justice of Australia

The idea of a federal supreme court was raised during the Constitutional Conventions of the 1890s. A proposal for a supreme court of Australia was included in an 1891 draft. It was proposed to enable the court to hear appeals from the state supreme courts, with appeals to the Privy Council only occurring on assent from the British monarch. It was proposed that the Privy Council be prevented from hearing appeals on constitutional matters.

This draft was largely the work of Sir Samuel Griffith, then the Premier of Queensland. The attorney-general of Tasmania Andrew Inglis Clark also contributed to the constitution's judicial clauses. Clark's most significant contribution was to give the court its own constitutional authority, ensuring a separation of powers. The original formulation of Griffith, Barton and Kingston provided only that the parliament could establish a court.

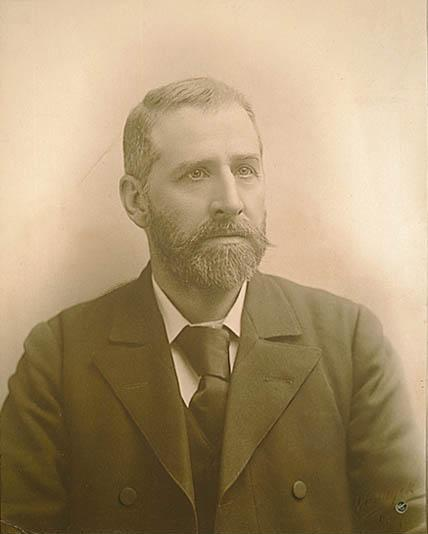
Andrew Inglis Clark, prominent contributor to the clauses about the High Court in the Constitution of Australia

The draft was later amended at various conventions. (Note: In Adelaide in 1897, in Sydney later the same year and in Melbourne in early 1898) In Adelaide the court's proposed name was changed to be the "High Court of Australia".

Many people opposed the idea of the new court completely replacing the Privy Council. Commercial interests, particularly subsidiaries of British companies, preferred to operate under the unified jurisdiction of the British courts, and petitioned the conventions to that effect. Others argued that Australian judges were of a poorer quality than British, and that the inevitable divergence in law that would occur without the oversight of the Privy Council would put the legal system at risk.

Some politicians (e.g. George Dibbs) supported a retention of Privy Council supervision; whereas others, including Alfred Deakin, supported the design of the court as it was. Inglis Clark took the view that the possibility of divergence was a good thing, for the law could adapt appropriately to Australian circumstances. Despite this debate, the draft's judicial sections remained largely unchanged.

After the draft had been approved by the electors of the colonies, it was taken to London in 1899 for the assent of the British Imperial Parliament. The issue of Privy Council appeals remained a sticking point however; with objections made by Secretary of State for the Colonies, Joseph Chamberlain, the Chief Justice of South Australia, Sir Samuel Way, and Samuel Griffith, among others. In October 1899, Griffith made representations to Chamberlain soliciting suggestions from British ministers for alterations to the draft, and offered alterations of his own. Indeed, such was the effect of these and other representations that Chamberlain called for delegates from the colonies to come to London to assist with the approval process, with a view to their approving any alterations that the British government might see fit to make; delegates were sent, including Deakin, Barton and Charles Kingston, although they were under instructions that they would never agree to changes.

After intense lobbying both in Australia and in the United Kingdom, the Imperial Parliament finally approved the draft constitution. The draft as passed included an alteration to section 74, in a compromise between the two sides. It allowed for a general right of appeal from the High Court to the Privy Council, but the Parliament of Australia could make laws restricting this avenue. In addition, appeals in inter se (Note: (matters concerning the boundary between and limits of the powers of the Commonwealth and the powers of the states)) matters were not as of right, but had to be certified by the High Court.

==== Formation of the court ====
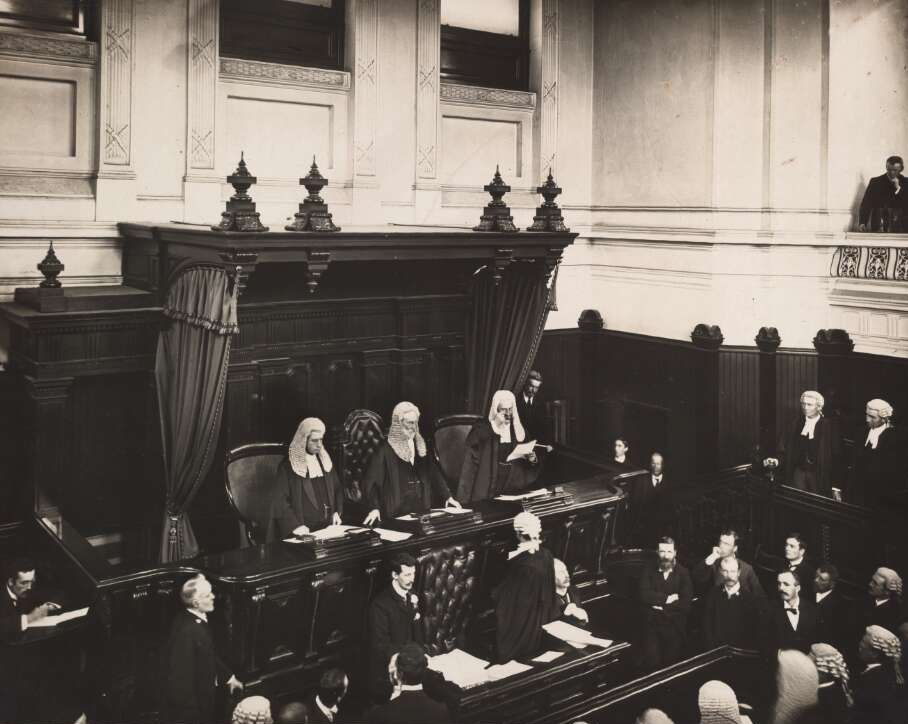
The first Chief Justice of Australia, Sir Samuel Griffith, is administered the judicial oath at the first sitting of the High Court, in the Banco Court of the Supreme Court of Victoria, 6 October 1903.

The High Court was not immediately established after the Commonwealth of Australia came into being on 1 January 1901. Some members of the first Parliament, including Sir John Quick, then one of the leading legal experts in Australia, opposed legislation to set up the court. Even H. B. Higgins, who was himself later appointed to the court, objected to setting it up, on the grounds that it would be impotent while Privy Council appeals remained, and that in any event there was not enough work for a federal court to make it viable.

The then Attorney-General Alfred Deakin introduced the Judiciary Bill to the House of Representatives in 1902. Prior efforts had been continually delayed by opponents in the parliament, and the success of the bill is generally attributed to Deakin's passion and persistence. Deakin proposed that the court be composed of five judges, specially selected to the court. Opponents instead proposed that the court should be made up of state supreme court justices, taking turns to sit on the High Court on a rotation basis, as had been mooted at the Constitutional Conventions a decade before. Deakin eventually negotiated amendments with the opposition, reducing the number of judges from five to three, and eliminating financial benefits such as pensions.

At one point, Deakin threatened to resign as Attorney-General due to the difficulties he faced. In his three and a half hour second reading speech to the House of Representatives, Deakin said,

The federation is constituted by distribution of powers, and it is this court which decides the orbit and boundary of every power... It is properly termed the keystone of the federal arch... The statute stands and will stand on the statute-book just as in the hour in which it was assented to. But the nation lives, grows and expands. Its circumstances change, its needs alter, and its problems present themselves with new faces. [The High Court] enables the Constitution to grow and be adapted to the changeful necessities and circumstances of generation after generation that the High Court operates.

Deakin's friend, painter Tom Roberts, who viewed the speech from the public gallery, declared it Deakin's "magnum opus". The Judiciary Act 1903 was finally passed on 25 August 1903, and the first three justices, Chief Justice Sir Samuel Griffith and justices Sir Edmund Barton and Richard O'Connor, were appointed on 5 October of that year. On 6 October, the court held its first sitting in the Banco Court in the Supreme Court of Victoria.

=== Early years ===
On 12 October 1906, the size of the High Court was increased to five justices, and Deakin appointed H. B. Higgins and Isaac Isaacs to the High Court. Following a court-packing attempt by the Labor Prime Minister Andrew Fisher In February 1913, the bench was increased again to a total to seven. Charles Powers and Albert Bathurst Piddington were appointed. These appointments generated an outcry, however, and Piddington resigned on 5 April 1913 after serving only one month as High Court justice.

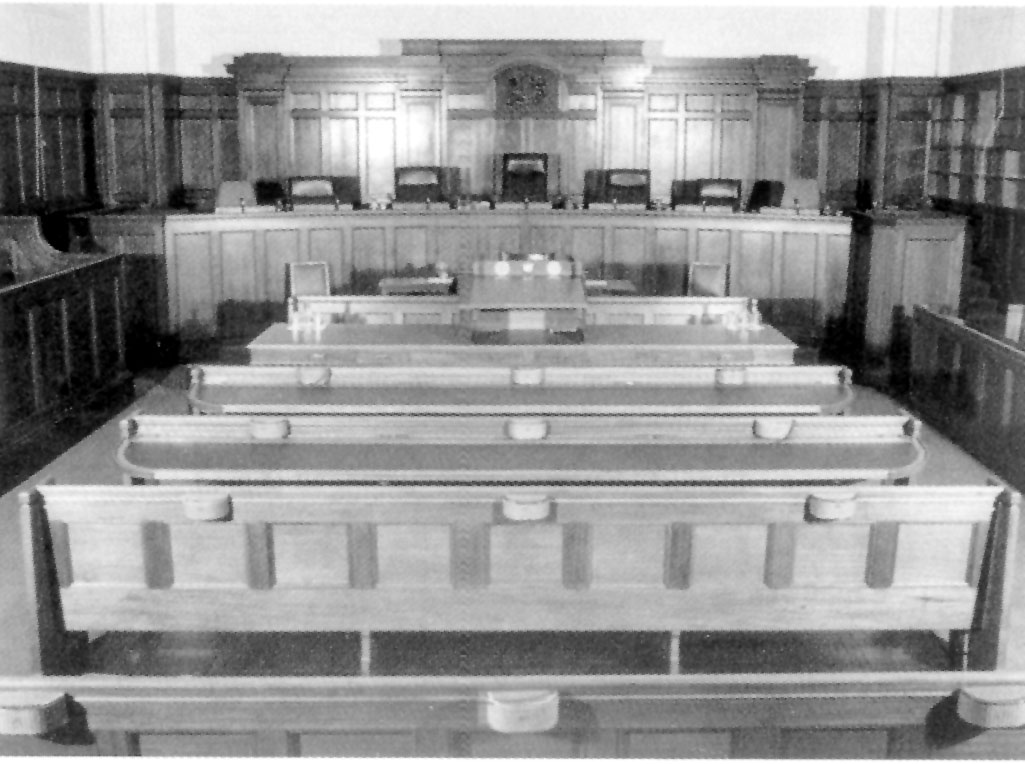
The court's home between 1928 and 1980, the purpose-built courtroom in Little Bourke Street, Melbourne

The High Court continued its Banco location in Melbourne until 1928, until a dedicated courtroom was built in Little Bourke Street, next to the Supreme Court of Victoria. That space provided the court's Melbourne sitting place and housed the court's principal registry until 1980. The court also sat regularly in Sydney, sharing space in the criminal courts of Darlinghurst Courthouse, before a dedicated courtroom was constructed next door in 1923.

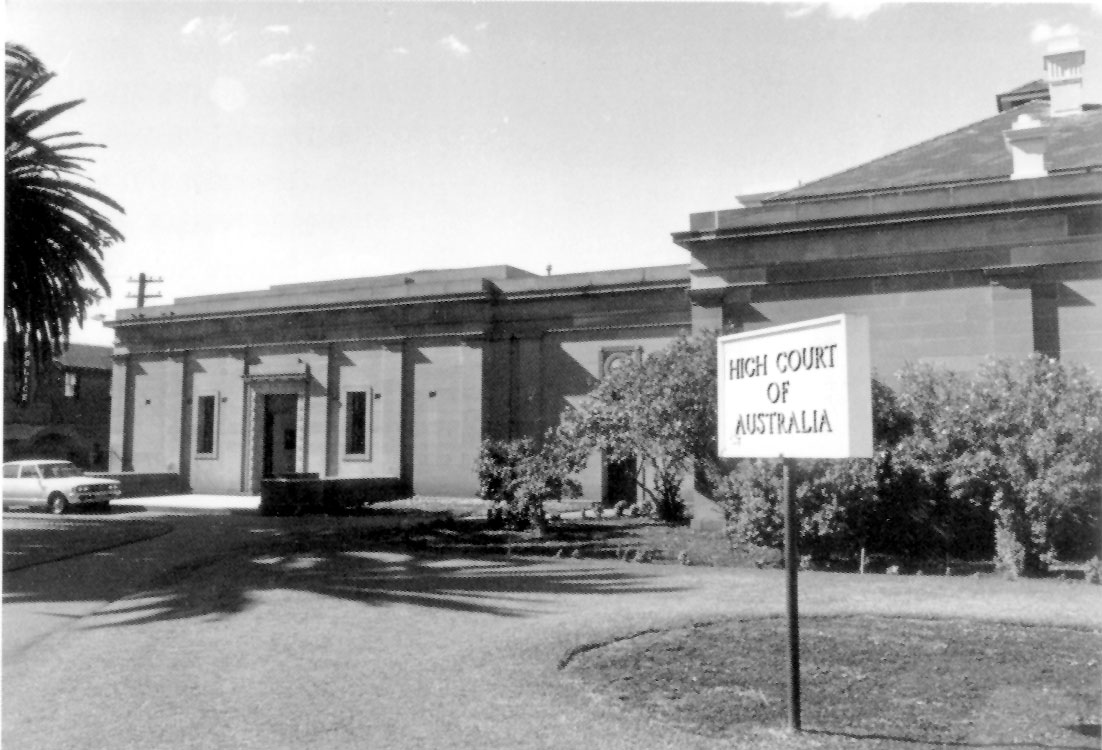
The annexe to the criminal court in Darlinghurst, the court's home in Sydney

The court travelled to other cities across the country, where it would use facilities of the respective supreme courts. Deakin had envisaged that the court would sit in many different locations, so as to truly be a federal court. Shortly after the court's creation, Chief Justice Griffith established a schedule for sittings in state capitals: Hobart in February, Brisbane in June, Perth in September, and Adelaide in October. It has been said that Griffith established this schedule because those were the times of year he found the weather most pleasant in each city.

The tradition of special sittings remains to this day, although they are dependent on the court's caseload. There are annual sittings in Perth, Adelaide and Brisbane for up to a week each year, and sittings in Hobart occur once every few years. Sittings outside of these special occurrences are conducted in Canberra.

The court's operations were marked by various anomalies during World War II. The Chief Justice, Sir John Latham, served from 1940 to 1941 as Australia's first ambassador to Japan; however, his activities in that role were limited by a pact Japan had entered with the Axis powers prior to his arrival in Tokyo. Owen Dixon was also absent for several years of his appointment, while serving as Australia's minister to the United States in Washington. Sir George Rich acted as chief justice during Latham's absence.

=== Post-war period ===
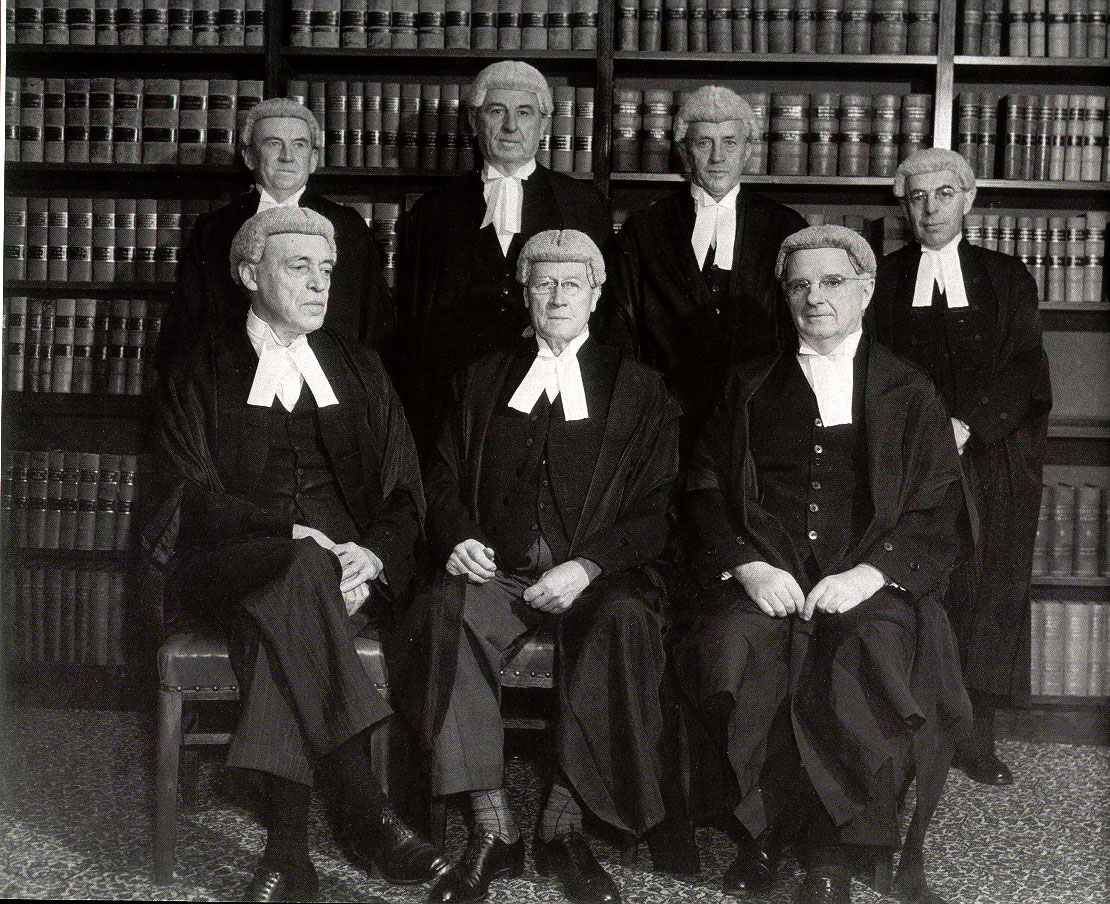
The bench in 1952, shortly before Chief Justice Latham's retirement. Back, left to right, Fullagar, Webb, Williams & Kitto. Front, left to right, Dixon, Latham & McTiernan

From 1952, with the appointment of Sir Owen Dixon as chief justice, the court entered a period of stability. After World War II, the court's workload continued to grow, particularly from the 1960s onwards, putting pressures on the court. Sir Garfield Barwick, who was attorney-general from 1958 to 1964, and from then until 1981 chief justice, proposed that more federal courts be established, as permitted under the Constitution. In 1976 the Federal Court of Australia was established, with a general federal jurisdiction, and in more recent years the Family Court and Federal Magistrates Court have been set up to reduce the court's workload in specific areas.

In 1968, appeals to the Privy Council in matters involving federal legislation were barred. In 1986, with the passage of the Australia Acts direct appeals to the Privy Council from state Supreme Courts were also closed off.

The life tenure of High Court justices ended in 1977. A national referendum in May 1977 approved the Constitution Alteration (Retirement of Judges) 1977, which upon its commencement on 29 July 1977 amended section 72 of the Constitution so as require that all justices appointed from then on must retire on attaining the age of 70 years.

The High Court of Australia Act 1979 (Cth), which commenced on 21 April 1980, gave the High Court power to administer its own affairs and prescribed the qualifications for, and method of appointment of, its Justices.

== Legal history ==
Historical periods of the High Court are commonly denoted by reference to the chief justice of the time, akin to that of the Supreme Court of Canada under the Chief Justice of Canada. However, the chief justice is not always the most influential figure on the Court. (Note: For example; Isaacs J was the primary force in the Knox Court, while his own tenure as Chief Justice saw Dixon J emerge as the Court's leading jurist)

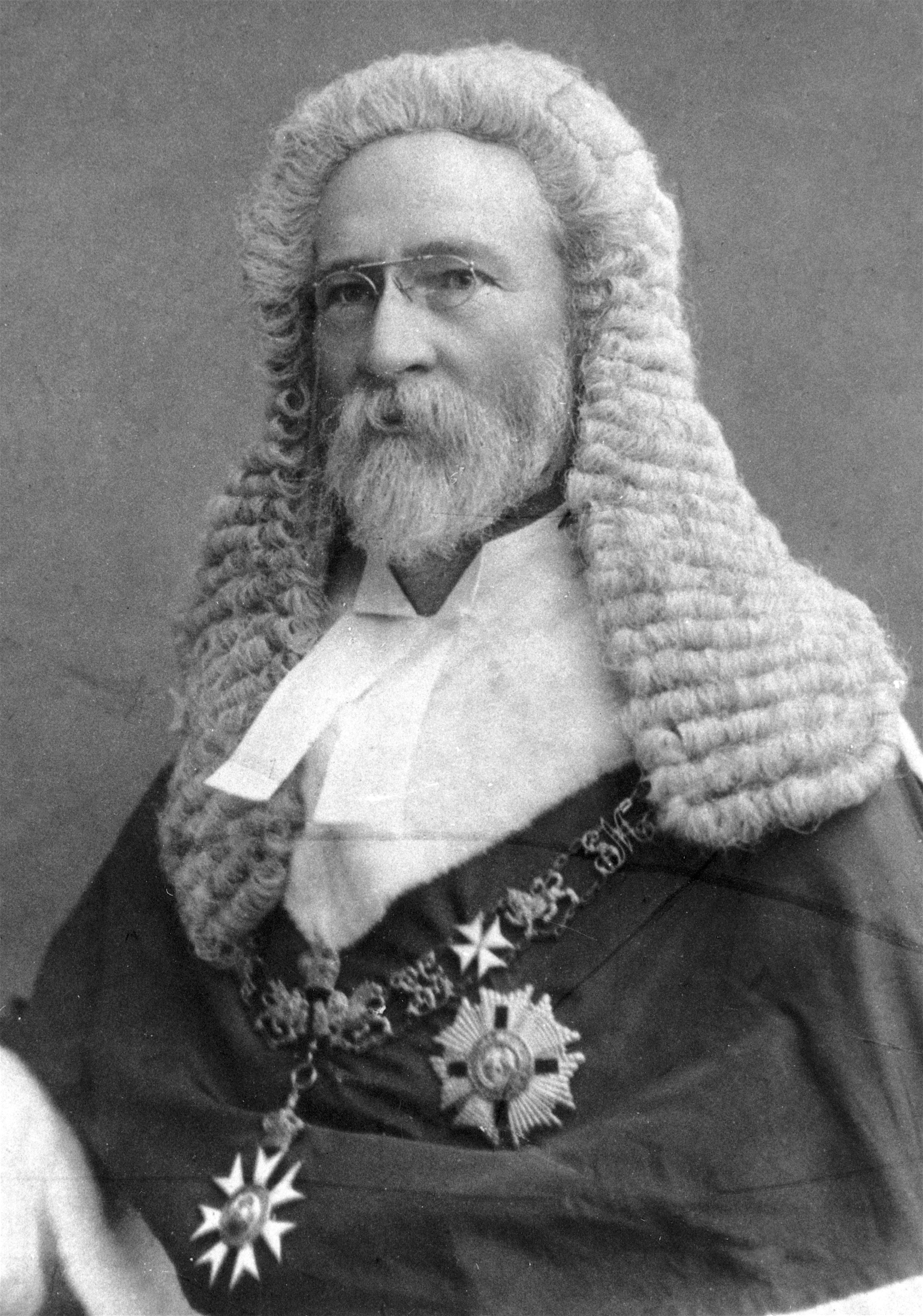
Chief Justice Griffith

=== Griffith court: 1903–1919 ===
The first court under Chief Justice Griffith laid the foundations of Australia's constitutional law. The court was conscious of its position as Australia's new court of appeal, and made efforts to establish its authority at the top of Australia's court hierarchy. In Deakin v Webb (1904) It criticised the Victorian Supreme Court for following a Privy Council decision about the Constitution of Canada instead of its own authority.

In its early years Griffith and other federalists on the bench were dominant. Their decisions were occasionally at odds with nationalist judges such as Sir Isaac Isaacs and H. B. Higgins in 1906. With the death of Justice Richard Edward O'Connor, in 1912; the nationalists achieved majority and Griffith's influence began to decline.

The early constitutional law decisions of the Griffith court was influenced by US constitutional law. (Note: e.g. In the case of D'Emden v Pedder, which involved the application of Tasmanian stamp duty to a federal official's salary, the court adopted the doctrine of implied immunity of instrumentalities which had been established in the United States Supreme Court case of McCulloch v. Maryland)

An important doctrine peculiar to the Griffith court was that of the reserved state powers. (Note: The concept was developed in such cases as Peterswald v Bartley (1904), R v Barger (1908) and the Union Label case (1908).) Under this doctrine, the Commonwealth parliament's legislative powers were to be interpreted narrowly; so as to avoid intruding on areas of power traditionally exercised by the state Parliaments prior to federation. Anthony Mason has noted that this doctrine probably helped smooth the transition to a federal system of government and "by preserving a balance between the constituent elements of the Australian federation, probably conformed to community sentiment, which at that stage was by no means adjusted to the exercise of central power".

Griffith and Sir Edmund Barton were frequently consulted by governors-general, including on the exercise of the reserve powers.

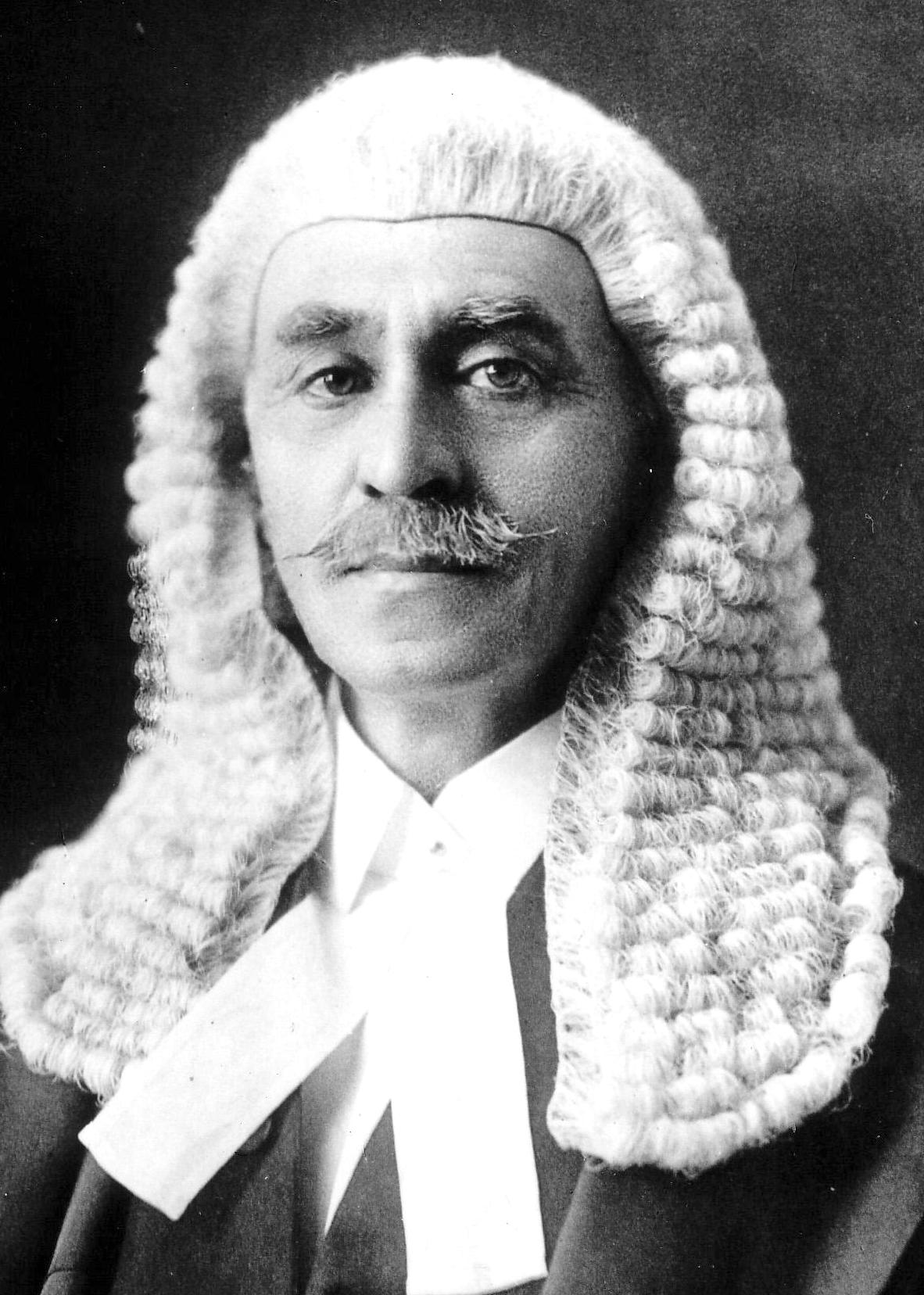
Sir Isaac Isaacs, Justice from 1906 and Chief Justice from 1930 to 1931

=== Knox, Isaacs and Gavan Duffy courts: 1919–1935 ===
==== Knox court ====
Adrian Knox became chief justice on 18 October 1919. Justice Edmund Barton died soon after, leaving no original members. During the Knox court, Justice Isaacs Isaacs had strong influence.

Under the Knox court the Engineers case was decided, ending the reserved state powers doctrine. The decision had lasting significance for the federal balance in Australia's political arrangements. Another significant decision was Roche v Kronheimer, in which the court relied upon the defence power to uphold federal legislation seeking to implement Australia's obligations under the Treaty of Versailles. (Note: Higgins opted to rely upon the external affairs power; making this the first instance where a judge attempted to rely upon the external affairs power to implement an international treaty in Australia)

==== Isaacs court ====
Sir Isaac Isaacs was Chief Justice for only forty-two weeks; he left the court to be appointed governor-general. He was ill for most of his term, and few significant cases were decided in this time.

==== Duffy court ====
Sir Frank Gavan Duffy was Chief Justice for four years from 1931; but he was already 78 when appointed to the position. He was not influential, and only participated in 40% of the cases during his tenure. For the most part he gave short judgements, or joined in the judgements of his colleagues. His frequent absence resulted in many tied decisions which have no lasting value as precedent.

Important cases of this time include:

- Attorney-General (New South Wales) v Trethowan (Note: which considered the NSW Premier Jack Lang's attempt at abolishing the New South Wales Legislative Council)
- The First State Garnishee case (Note: which upheld federal legislation compelling the Lang government to repay its loans)
- Tuckiar v The King (Note: which examined legal ethics and the treatment of Indigenous people before the Australian justice system)

=== Latham court: 1935–1952 ===
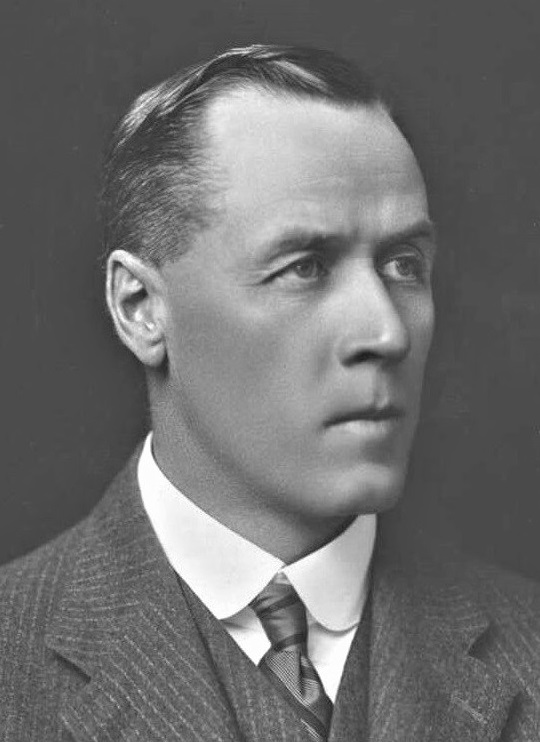
John Latham, as Deputy Prime Minister prior to appointment

John Latham was elevated to Chief Justice in 1935. His tenure is most notable for the court's interpretation of wartime legislation, and the subsequent transition back to peace.

Most legislation was upheld as enabled by the defence power. (Note: e.g. Andrews v Howell (1941) and de Mestre v Chisholm (1944).) The Curtin Labor government's legislation was rarely successfully challenged, with the court recognizing a necessity that the defence power permit the federal government to govern strongly.

The court allowed for the establishment of a national income tax scheme in the First Uniform Tax case, and upheld legislation declaring the pacifist Jehovah's Witnesses denomination to be a subversive organisation. (Note: see: Jehovah's Witnesses case)

Following the war, the court reined in the scope of the defence power. It struck down several key planks of the Chifley Labor government's reconstruction program, notably an attempt to nationalise the banks in the Bank Nationalisation case (1948), and an attempt to establish a comprehensive medical benefits scheme in the First Pharmaceutical Benefits case (1945).

Other notable cases of the era include:

- The Communist Party case (Note: In which the court struck down Menzies Liberal government legislation banning the Communist Party of Australia)
- Proudman v Dayman (Note: which developed the criminal defence of honest and reasonable mistake of fact)
- R v Burgess; Ex parte Henry (Note: presaged an expansive interpretation of the external affairs power, by upholding the implementation of an air navigation treaty)

=== Dixon court: 1952–1964 ===
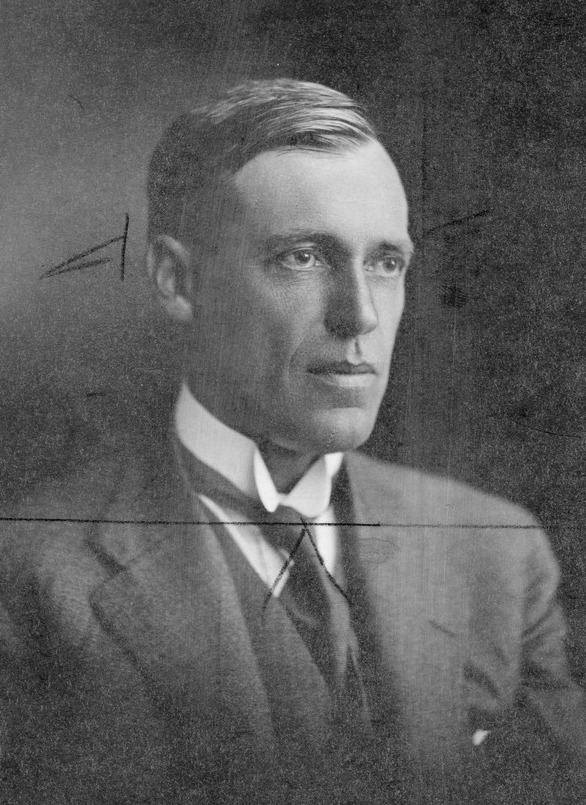
Owen Dixon

Owen Dixon was appointed Chief Justice in 1952, after 23 years as a Justice on the court.

During his tenure the court experienced what some have described as a "Golden Age". Dixon had strong influence on the court during this period. The court experienced a marked increase in the number of joint judgements, many of which were led by Dixon. The era has also been noted for the presence of generally good relations among the court's judges.

Notable decisions of the Dixon court include:

- The Boilermakers' case (Note: In which the applicability of the separation of powers in protecting the judiciary from interference was firmly asserted)
- Second Uniform Tax case (Note: In which the continued existence of the federal government's wartime income tax scheme was upheld as constitutional)

During Dixon's time, the court came to adopt by majority several of the views he had expressed in minority years prior.

=== Barwick court: 1964–1981 ===
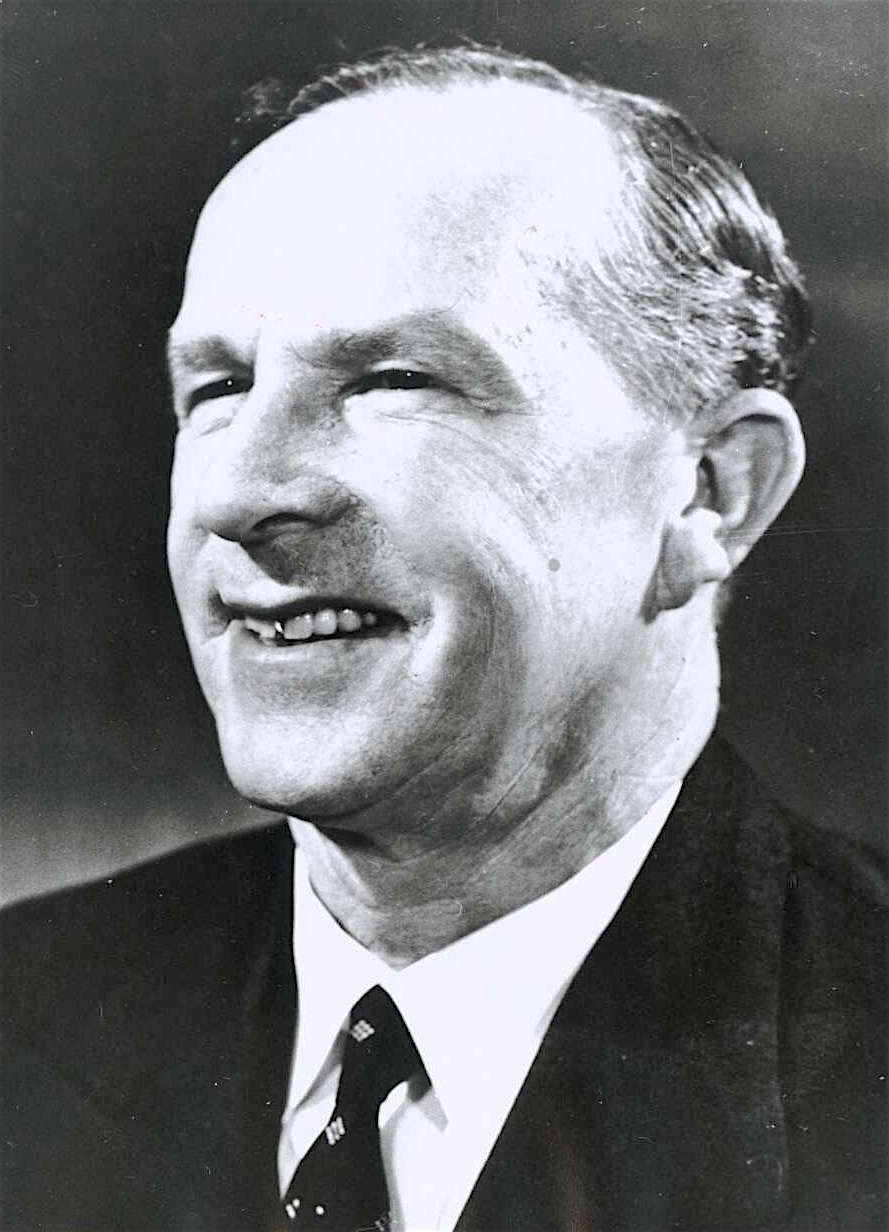
Garfield Barwick

Garfield Barwick was appointed Chief Justice in 1964.

Among other things, the Barwick court is known for controversially deciding several cases on tax avoidance and tax evasion, almost always deciding against the taxation office. Led by Barwick himself in most judgments, the court distinguished between avoidance (legitimately minimising one's tax obligations) and evasion (illegally evading obligations). The decisions effectively nullified the anti-avoidance legislation and led to the proliferation of avoidance schemes in the 1970s, a result which drew much criticism upon the court.

Notable decisions of the Barwick court include:

- Bradley v Commonwealth
- The Concrete Pipes case (Note: a case that marked the beginning of the modern interpretation of the corporations power; which had been interpreted narrowly since 1909. It established that the federal parliament could exercise the power to regulate at least the trading activities of corporations. Earlier interpretations had allowed only the regulation of conduct or transactions with the public)
- The Seas and Submerged Lands case (Note: upholding legislation asserting sovereignty over the territorial sea)
- The First and Second Territory Senators' cases (Note: Which concerned whether legislation allowing for the mainland territories to be represented in the Parliament of Australia was valid)
- Russell v Russell (Note: concerning the validity of the Family Law Act 1975)
- Cormack v Cope (Note: a case relating to the historic 1974 joint sitting of the Parliament of Australia)
- Victoria v Commonwealth

=== Gibbs court: 1981–1987 ===
Sir Harry Gibbs was appointed as Chief Justice in 1981.

Among the Gibbs court's notable jurisprudence is an interpretive expansion of the Commonwealth's legislative powers. Scholars have also noted a tendency away from the traditions of legalism and conservatism that characterised the Dixon and Barwick courts.

Notable decisions of the court include:

- Koowarta v Bjelke-Petersen (Note: In which the court held 4:3 that the Racial Discrimination Act 1975 was validly supported by s51(xxix))
- The Tasmanian Dams case (Note: In which the court held that federal environmental legislation interfering with a Tasmanian dam construction was validly supported by s51(xxix))
- Kioa v West (Note: In which the court expanded on the doctrines of natural justice and procedural fairness)
- The Chamberlain case
- A v Hayden (Note: concerning the botched ASIS exercise at the Sheraton Hotel in Melbourne)

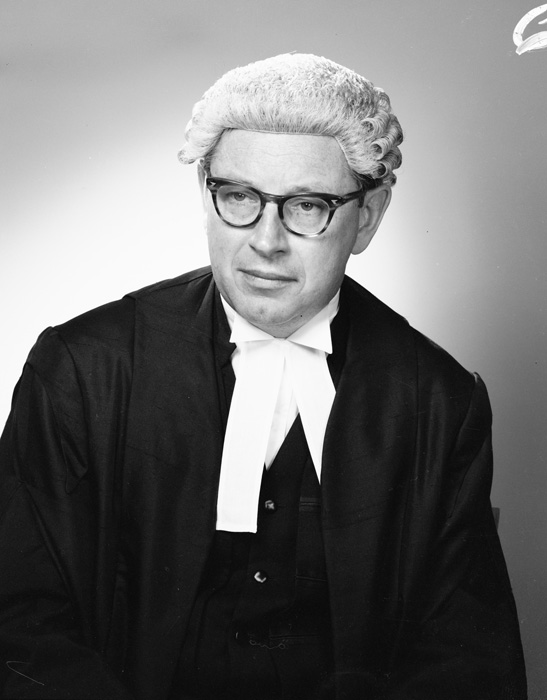
Anthony Mason

=== Mason court: 1987–1995 ===
Sir Anthony Mason became Chief Justice in 1987.

The Mason court is known for being one of the most legally liberal benches of the court. It was a notably stable court, with the only change in its bench being the appointment of McHugh following Wilson's retirement.

Some of the decisions of the court in this time were politically controversial. (Note: Especially Mabo) Scholars have noted that the Mason court has tended to receive "high praise and stringent criticism in equal measure".

Notable decisions of the court include:

- Cole v Whitfield (Note: Known for resolving an interpretive controversy regarding s92 of the Constitution; a section pertaining to free trade. Prior to Cole v Whitfield, the High Court was plagued with litigation on this section.)
- Dietrich v The Queen (Note: In which the court established a de facto constitutional requirement that legal aid be provided to defendants in serious criminal trials)
- Mabo v Queensland (No 2) (Note: In which it was found that native title was recognized by Australia's common law)
- Polyukhovich v Commonwealth (Note: regarding the validity of the War Crimes Act 1945)
- Sykes v Cleary (Note: regarding the disputed election of Phil Cleary)
- Waltons Stores v Maher

This era is also notable for originating Australia's implied freedom of political communication jurisprudence; through the cases Australian Capital Television Pty Ltd v Commonwealth and Theophanous.

=== Brennan court: 1995–1998 ===
Sir Gerard Brennan succeeded Mason in 1995.

The court experienced many changes in members and significant cases in this three year period.

Notable decisions of the court include:

- Ha v New South Wales (Note: In which the court invalidated a New South Wales tobacco licensing scheme, reining in the licensing scheme exception to the prohibition on states levying excise duties, contained in Section 90 of the Constitution)
- Grollo v Palmer (Note: Known for the persona designata doctrine)
- Kable v DPP (Note: Known for establishing the 'Kable Doctrine')
- Lange v ABC (Note: An important case within Australia's implied freedom of political communication jurisprudence)
- The Wik case (Note: on whether statutory leases extinguish native title rights)

Murray Gleeson

=== Gleeson court: 1998–2008 ===
Murray Gleeson was appointed Chief Justice in 1998. The Gleeson Court has been regarded as a relatively conservative period of the court's history.

Notable decisions of the court include:

- Al-Kateb v Godwin
- Egan v Willis
- New South Wales v Commonwealth (Workchoices Case)
- R v Tang
- Re Wakim; Ex parte McNally (Note: In which the court struck down legislation vesting state jurisdiction in the Federal Court)
- Sue v Hill
- Western Australia v Ward
- The Yorta Yorta case

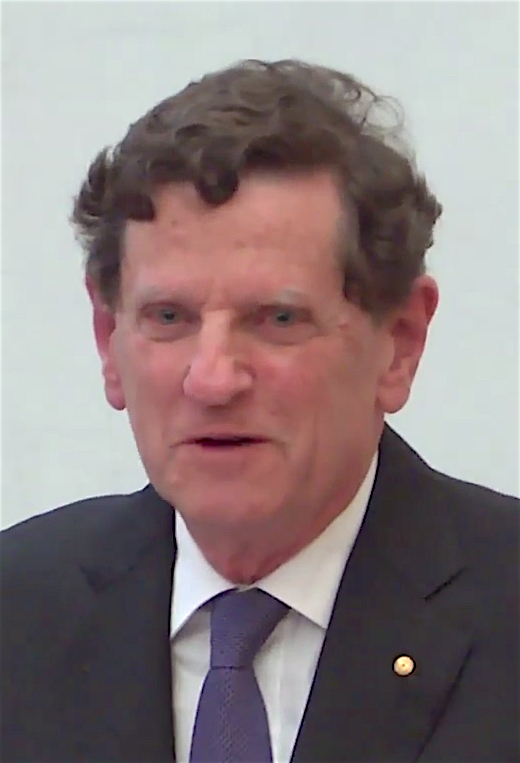
Robert French

=== French court: 2008–2017 ===
Robert French was appointed Chief Justice in September 2008.

Notable decisions of the French court include:

- Pape v Commissioner of Taxation
- Plaintiff M70
- Williams v Commonwealth

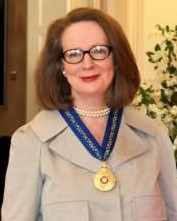
Susan Kiefel in 2011

=== Kiefel court: 2017–2023 ===
Susan Kiefel was appointed Chief Justice in January 2017.

Legal scholars have noted a shift in judicial style within the Kiefel court to one that attempts broad consensus. The frequency of dissenting judgements has decreased; and there have been relatively fewer decisions with a 4:3 split. Extrajudicially, Kiefel has expressed sympathy for judicial practices that maximise consensus and minimise dissent.

Additionally, it has been noted that Kiefel, Keane, and Bell frequently deliver a joint judgement when a unanimous consensus is not reached; often resulting in their decisions being determinative of the majority. This recent practice of the court has been criticised by the scholar Jeremy Gans, with comparisons drawn to the Four Horsemen era of the US Supreme Court.

Notable decisions of the Kiefel court include:

- Re Canavan (Note: See: 2017–18 Australian parliamentary eligibility crisis)
- Wilkie v Commonwealth (Note: In which the Court held that expenditure for the Australian Marriage Law Postal Survey had been approved by Parliament and was the collection of "statistical information" that could be conducted by the Australian Bureau of Statistics.)
- AB v CD; EF v CD (Note: Release of this decision revealed the 'Lawyer X' scandal and the use of the criminal barrister Nicola Gobbo as a secret informant by the Victoria Police to the Australian public which lead to a Royal Commission)
- Pell v The Queen
- Love v Commonwealth (Note: In which the court decided that Aboriginal Australians and Torres Strait Islanders could not be considered "alien" to Australia, and so the Commonwealth Government's power to deport "aliens" under Constitution section 51(xix) did not apply to them.)
- Palmer v Western Australia
- Vanderstock v Victoria

=== Gageler court: November 2023 – Present ===
Stephen Gageler was appointed Chief Justice in November 2023.

Notable decisions of the Gageler court include:

- Commonwealth v Yunupingu
- NZYQ v Minister for Immigration

== Appointment process, composition, and working conditions ==
=== Appointment and tenure ===
High Court Justices are appointed by the Governor-General in Council. The advice of the Council typically consists of the advice of the prime minister assisted by the Attorney-General for Australia. Advice from the attorney-general is legally required by implication, because since 1979 the attorney-general has been required by statute to consult the attorneys-general of the states (but not the territories). Some reformers have advocated for states to have a determinative role.

Originally, no particular qualifications for appointment to the High Court were required by the Constitution or by statute. The only constitutional requirement is that the appointee be under the compulsory retirement age of 70. Further qualifications were introduced by statute in 1979: that an appointee be a judge of a federal, state or territory court; or have been an Australian legal practitioner for at least five years. Unlike members of the Parliament, it is not necessary to be an Australian Citizen and a member of the Court may be a dual citizen.

The appointment process has been relatively uncontroversial. (Note: Especially in comparison to the appointment process of the United States. See: US Supreme Court confirmation hearings) This has, however, been due in part to the opacity of the process. There is no procedure for application, the only definite criteria are the minimal criteria above, and nothing is publicly known until an appointee is announced. Appointment to federal courts was extensively formalised in 2007, except for the High Court, and those reforms were reversed by the next federal government. Some recent attorneys-general have stated that they were consulting widely—to include, for instance, Australian Women Lawyers, the National Association of Commonwealth Legal Centres and the heads of Australian law schools. However, the nature of the attorney-general's consultations remains almost wholly discretionary.

Some appointments to the High Court have displayed clear political influence. Three early justices had been conservative politicians prior to their appointment as chief justice; (Note: Knox, Latham, and Barwick) and Justices H. V. Evatt, Edward McTiernan, and Lionel Murphy were all Labor party politicians at some stage in their careers prior to being appointed to the High Court by a Labor prime minister.

Members of the Court are required to retire when they reach the age of 70. This requirement was introduced by constitutional amendment in 1977. Previously, there had been no retirement age and Sir Edward McTiernan had served for 46 years until being persuaded to retire at age 84. Retired members of the Court do not retain the title of 'Chief Justice' or 'Justice'.

=== Composition ===
The High Court has seven justices—the chief justice and six other justices.

As of 2025 the High Court has had 57 justices, fourteen of whom have been chief justice.

| Name | State | Date appointed | Mandatory retirement | Appointing Governor-General | Nominating Prime Minister | Previous posting(s) | Education |
|---|---|---|---|---|---|---|---|
| Stephen Gageler (Chief Justice) | NSW | 6 November 2023 (as Chief Justice); 9 October 2012 (as Justice) | 4 July 2028 | David Hurley (as Chief Justice); Quentin Bryce (as Justice) | Anthony Albanese (Labor, as Chief Justice); Julia Gillard (Labor, as Justice) | Solicitor-General of Australia | Australian National University; Harvard University |
| Michelle Gordon | Vic | 9 June 2015 | 18 November 2034 | Peter Cosgrove | Tony Abbott (Liberal) | Federal Court of Australia | University of Western Australia |
| James Edelman | WA | 30 January 2017 | 8 January 2044 | Peter Cosgrove | Malcolm Turnbull (Liberal) | Supreme Court of Western Australia; Federal Court of Australia | University of Western Australia; Murdoch University; University of Oxford |
| Simon Steward | Vic | 1 December 2020 | 9 January 2039 | David Hurley | Scott Morrison (Liberal) | Federal Court of Australia | University of Melbourne |
| Jacqueline Gleeson | NSW | 1 March 2021 | 6 March 2036 | David Hurley | Scott Morrison (Liberal) | Federal Court of Australia | University of Sydney |
| Jayne Jagot | NSW | 17 October 2022 | 18 June 2035 | David Hurley | Anthony Albanese (Labor) | Federal Court of Australia; Land and Environment Court of New South Wales | Macquarie University; University of Sydney |
| Robert Beech-Jones | NSW | 6 November 2023 | 2035 | David Hurley | Anthony Albanese (Labor) | Supreme Court of New South Wales | Australian National University |

==== Initial composition ====
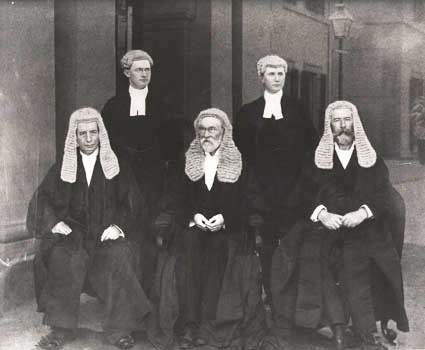
The first bench of the High Court: Barton, Griffith and O'Connor seated, with court officials in the background. Photo taken at the first sitting of the court on 6 October 1903.

The first High Court bench consisted of three justices: Samuel Griffith, Edmund Barton, and Richard O'Connor.

According to the contemporary press, among those considered and overlooked were Henry Higgins, Isaac Isaacs, Andrew Clark, John Downer, Josiah Symon, and George Wise.

Barton and O'Connor were both members of the federal parliament's government bench. Each appointee had participated in the drafting of the Constitution. All three have been described as relatively conservative justices for the time, and were strongly influenced by law of the United States in their constitutional jurisprudence.

==== Expansion of the court ====
In 1906, at the request of the Justices, two seats were added to the bench, with Isaacs and Higgins being appointed.

After O'Connor's death in 1912, an amendment was made to the Judiciary Act expanding the bench to seven, which took place the following year.

Following Isaacs' retirement in 1931, his seat was left vacant, and an amendment to the Judiciary Act reduced the number of seats to six. This, however, led to some decisions being split three-all.

With the appointment of Justice Webb in 1946, the court returned to seven seats, and has had a full bench of seven justices since.

==== Historical and Current demographics ====
Only seven of the High Court's fifty-six justices have been women.

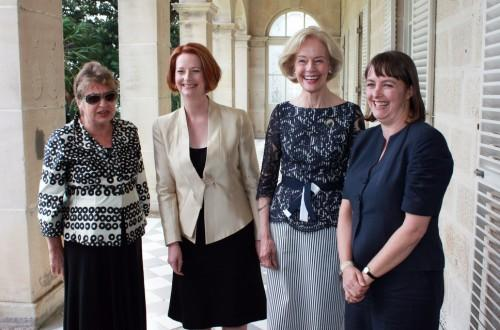
Mary Gaudron (left) with Prime Minister Julia Gillard, Governor-General Quentin Bryce, Attorney-General Nicola Roxon in 2011

The first female appointee to the bench was Mary Gaudron (who was a justice from 1987 to 2003), the second was Susan Crennan (who was a justice from 2005 to 2015), and the third Virginia Bell from 2009 to 2021.

As of October 2022, for the first time there is now a female majority of the justices on the current bench with justices Susan Kiefel, Michelle Gordon, Jacqueline Gleeson, and Jayne Jagot (as replacement for Patrick Keane)

In 2017, Justice Kiefel became the first woman to be appointed Chief Justice.

Michael Kirby was the first openly gay justice of the Court. He was replaced by Virginia Bell, who was the first lesbian justice on the bench.

Twenty-eight appointees have been residents of New South Wales, twenty-five of which graduated from Sydney Law School. Sixteen have come from Victoria, eight from Queensland, and four from Western Australia. No resident of South Australia, Tasmania, or any of the territories has ever been appointed to the bench.

The majority of justices have been of Protestant backgrounds, with a smaller number of a Catholic background. Two Jewish members have been appointed, Sir Isaac Isaacs and James Edelman, making them the only members of the court to have a faith background other than Christianity. However, many justices have refrained from commenting publicly upon their religious views.

Almost all judges on the High Court have taken silk in some form prior to their appointment, in the form of appointment to King's Counsel (KC), Queen's Counsel (QC) or Senior Counsel (SC). The exceptions are Starke, McTiernan, Webb, Walsh, Kirby, French, Edelman and Jagot.

Thirteen justices of the court previously served in a Parliament, however no previous parliamentarian has been appointed to the court since Lionel Murphy in 1975.

=== Working conditions ===
Salaries are determined by the Remuneration Tribunal. The regular justices receive $551,880, while the Chief justice receives $608,150. High Court judicial compensation is constitutionally protected from decrease during appointment.

The court typically sits for two weeks for each calendar month of the year, excepting for January and July in which no sitting days are held.

==== Judicial associates ====
Each judge engages associates for assistance in exercising their functions. The usual practice is to engage two associates simultaneously for a one-year term. Additionally, the chief justice is assisted by a legal research officer employed by the court library.

Associates have varying responsibilities; typically their work involves legal research, assistance in preparation for oral arguments, tipping in court during oral argument, editing judgments and assisting with extrajudicial functions, such as speech-writing. Associates are typically recruited after having graduated from an Australian law school with grades at or near the top of their class. Hundreds of applications for associate positions are received by the High Court annually.

Former associates include former federal attorney-general Nicola Roxon, legal scholar Adrienne Stone, and constitutional scholar George Williams.

Three High Court justices served as associates prior to their elevation to the bench: Aickin to Dixon, Gageler to Mason, and Edelman to Toohey.

== Facilities ==
=== Building ===
The High Court of Australia building is located on the shore of Lake Burley Griffin in Canberra's Parliamentary Triangle. The High Court was designed between 1972 and 1974 by the Australian architect Christopher Kringas (1936–1975), a director of the firm Edwards Madigan Torzillo and Briggs. The building was constructed from 1975 to 1980. Its international architectural significance is recognised by the Union of International Architects register of Architectural Heritage of the 20th Century. It received the Australian Institute of Architects Canberra Medallion in 1980 and the award for Enduring Architecture in 2007. The High Court was added to the Commonwealth Heritage List in 2004.

=== Online ===
The High Court makes itself generally available to the public through its own website. Judgment alerts, available on the Court's website and by email with free subscription, provide subscribers with notice of upcoming judgments (normally a week beforehand) and, almost immediately after the delivery of a major judgment, with a brief summary of it (normally not more than one page). All of the court's judgments, as well as transcripts of its hearings since 2009 and other materials, are made available, free of charge, through the Australasian Legal Information Institute. The court has recently established on its website an "eresources" page, containing for each case its name, keywords, mentions of relevant legislation and a link to the full judgment; these links go to the original text from 2000 onward, scanned texts from 1948 to 1999 and facsimiles from the Commonwealth Law Reports for their first 100 volumes (1903 to 1959); there are also facsimiles of some unreported judgments (1906–2002). Since October 2013, audio-visual recordings of full-court hearings held in Canberra have been available on its website.

== Gallery ==
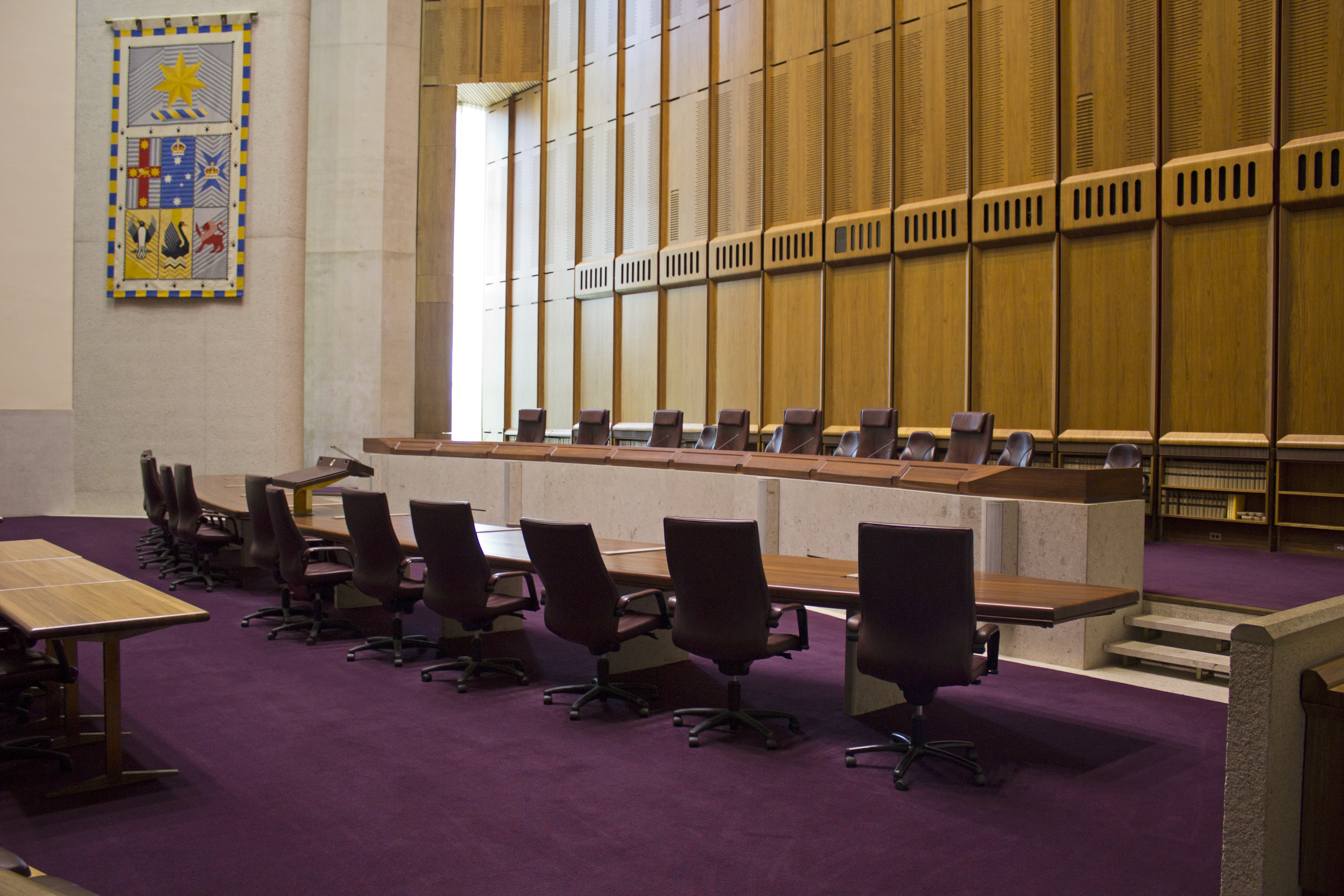
The No. 1 Courtroom, used for all cases that require a full bench of seven justices

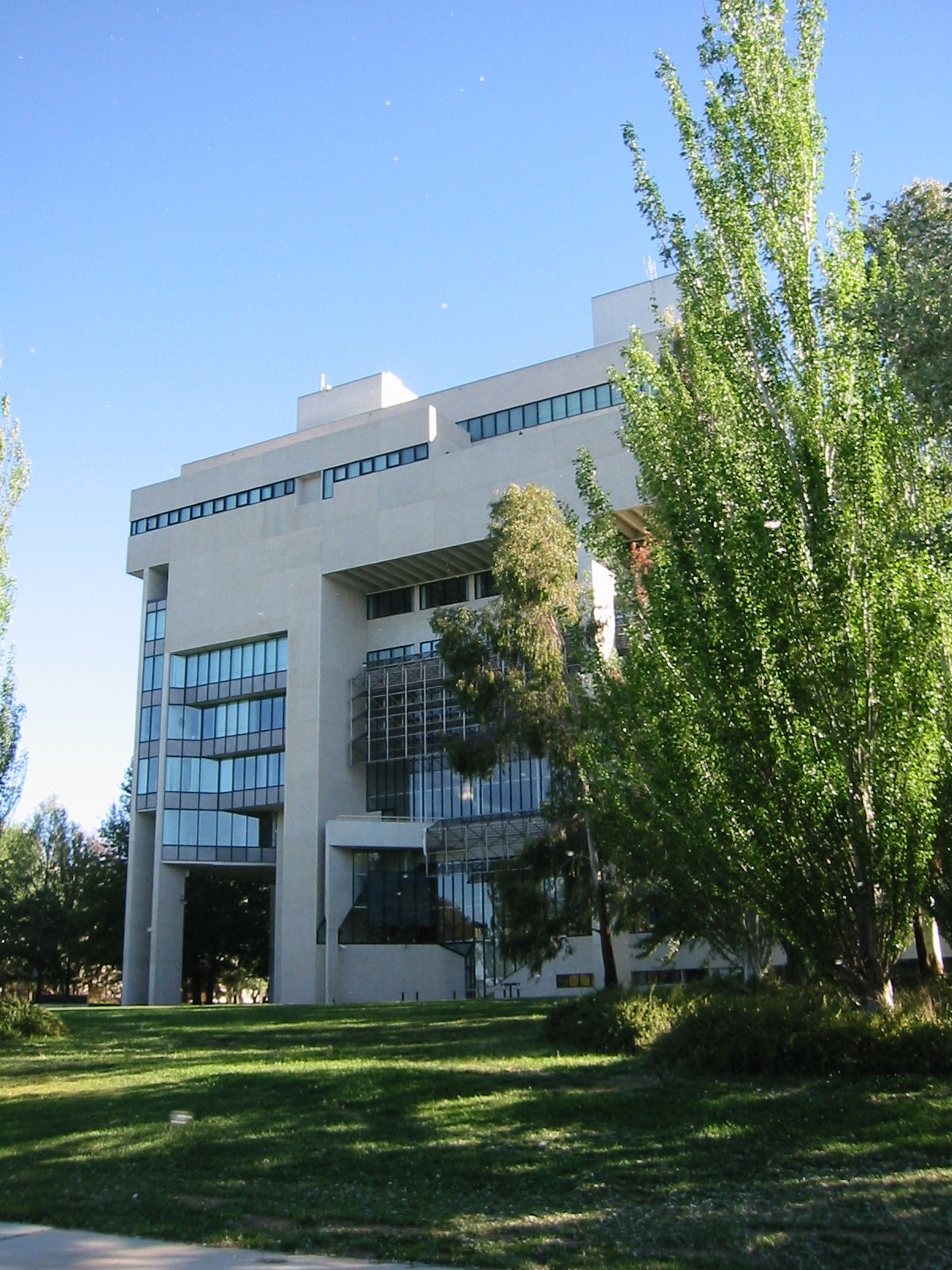
High Court building

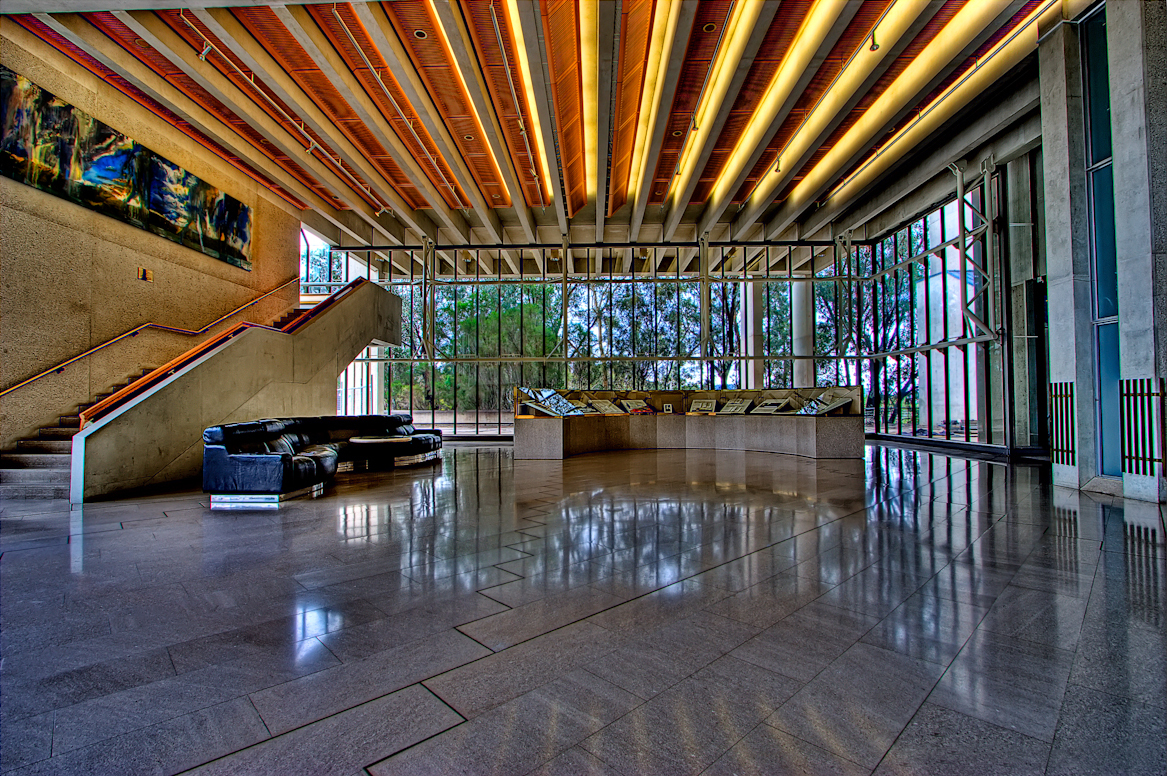
Entry hall

== See also ==
- Australian court hierarchy
- Judiciary Act 1903
- Judiciary of Australia
- Law of Australia
- List of chief justices of Australia by time in office
- List of High Court of Australia cases
- List of justices of the High Court of Australia
- List of law schools attended by Australian High Court justices
