= Special leave in the High Court of Australia =

Special leave refers to a procedure in the High Court of Australia where parties apply to have their cases heard by the court.

During this process the court decides whether or not the appeal a party is attempting to raise merits the attention of the High Court.

To be granted special leave to appeal, the applicant must convince the Court that the case raises a question of public or legal importance that is significant enough to warrant the attention of the High Court. The precise criteria for this is detailed in Section 35A of the Judiciary Act. The Australian parliament has the authority to regulate the form of appeals to the High Court, virtue of section 73 of the Australian constitution.

The overwhelming majority of special leave applications fail before the court. In the later half of the 2010s, only ~10% of applications were accepted by the court and proceeded to a further hearing. Of those cases that proceeded to a further hearing, usually, a little over half are successful on appeal each year.

== Procedure ==
Special leave applications are governed by Part 41 of the High Court Rules. The rules set out the procedure for making a special leave application, including the form and content of the application, the time limits for making an application, and the requirements for supporting documents and evidence.

One notorious rule of the special leave process is that parties must (typically) fully detail their oral submissions within a strict 20 minute time limit. These oral submissions are usually supported by written submissions provided to the court prior to special leave process. Another is that written applications must typically not exceed twelve pages, while the respondent's written response must not exceed ten pages.

Usually, special leave applications are heard by a panel of three justices, with decisions as to whether a case shall be raised decided by a majority of the justices. However, they may also be heard and decided by single judges, or even the full bench of the court. While rare, this does occur in practice.

== Outcomes ==
Around 80% of special leave applications are decided by the High Court without an oral hearing. Nearly all of these are dismissed.

Special leave applications in the High Court are typically an extremely complex and expensive process. Legal practitioners who have experience in the special leave process are highly prized, and barristers with a proven ability to successfully raise cases through the special leave process are highly regarded.

One minor quirk of the special leave process is that it is possible for special leave to be withdrawn at any time by the Court, which effectively dismisses the applicant's appeal. On occasion the court does decide cases in this way, even after the full hearing has occurred; a practice that has puzzled Australian legal academics.

Written reasons are typically not provided for dismissal of special leave applications. This practice has been criticised by some Australian academics on rule of law grounds.
