= Victorian Reports =

The Victorian Reports (VR) are a series of law reports which report significant cases from the Supreme Court of Victoria in its first decisions and appeal decisions jurisdictions.

The reports were initially titled the Victorian Law Reports (VLR) (1875 to 1956), before adopting their present title in 1957. Earlier equivalent reports, published between 1847 and 1851, had been known as "Williams practice cases" and "A'Beckett's reserved judgments".

In 2016, Little William Bourke commenced publishing the Victorian Reports. The new portal contains both the VRs and the VLRs (1875 to date) in a searchable format.

== See also ==
- List of Law Reports in Australia
