= Kioa v West =

Judgement of the High Court of Australia

- Court: High Court of Australia
- Full case name: Kioa and Others v Minister for Immigration and Ethnic Affairs and Another
- Decided: 18 December 1985
- Citations: [1985] HCA 81, (1985) 159 CLR 550

Case history
- Prior action: Kioa v West (1984) 6 ALN N21 - Federal Court
- Subsequent action: none

Court membership
- Judges sitting: Gibbs CJ, Mason, Wilson, Brennan & Deane JJ

Case opinions
- (5:0) The Administrative Decisions (Judicial Review) Act does not oblige the repository of a statutory power to observe the rules of natural justice in exercising that power. (per Curiam) (4:1) The rules of natural justice applied to the exercise of the power to deport a prohibited immigrant. (per Mason, Wilson, Brennan & Deane JJ; Gibbs CJ dissenting) (4:1) The failure to provide an opportunity to respond to prejudicial material in submissions made to the decision maker was a failure to afford procedural fairness. (per Mason, Wilson, Brennan & Deane JJ; Gibbs CJ dissenting) (3:0) The decision maker was not bound to take into account specific international conventions but was obligated to consider general humanitarian principles. (per Gibbs CJ, Wilson & Brennan JJ; Mason & Deane JJ not considering)

Kioa v West, was a notable case decided in the High Court of Australia regarding the extent and requirements of natural justice and procedural fairness in administrative decision making. The case was also a significant factor in Australia's subsequently limiting what had previously been completely unrestricted jus soli now only to children born to an Australian citizen or permanent resident.

== Background ==
Mr and Mrs Kioa, who were both from Tonga, entered Australia on temporary entry permits in late 1981. When their permits expired they changed their address without informing authorities. Mr Kioa worked in Victoria until he was arrested as a prohibited immigrant in 1983. In the intervening period the Kioas had a daughter, who by virtue of her birth in Australia, was an Australian citizen. Mr Kioa explained that he overstayed his permit in order to earn money to send home to relatives who were suffering as a result of a cyclone in Tonga.

In October 1983, a delegate of the Minister for Immigration and Ethnic Affairs made a decision that the Kioas should be deported. In arriving at that decision the delegate took into account a departmental submission which, inter alia, submitted that Mr Kioa had been actively involved with people who were seeking to circumvent Australia's immigration laws.

The Kioas unsuccessfully appealed the decision to the Federal Court, and the Full Federal Court. They then appealed to the High Court.

== Kioas' arguments ==
The Kioas' principal argument was that the decision maker had failed to afford them procedural fairness in not disclosing and allowing an opportunity to respond to the adverse allegations made in the departmental submission.

They further argued that the delegate had wrongly failed to take into account:

- the detrimental effect the decision may have on their child; and
- the provisions of the International Covenant on Civil and Political Rights and the Declaration of the Rights of the Child.

== The full court ==
The full court of the Federal Court held that the principles of natural justice did not apply to the decision to deport a person under the Migration Act and there was no evidence that the delegate had failed to take into account the interests of the Kioas' child. It was further held that the provisions of the Covenant and Declaration did not form part of Australian domestic law and were not required to be taken into account.

== High Court's Decision ==
=== Administrative Decisions (Judicial Review) Act ===
Section 5(1)(a) of the Administrative Decisions (Judicial Review) Act provided that administrative decisions may be appealed on the ground that there had been a breach of the requirements of natural justice. The court unanimously held that this provision did not oblige a decision maker who was exercising a statutory power to observe the rules of natural justice. In the court's opinion the applicability of natural justice was to be determined by looking at the nature and circumstances of the decision to be made. Brennan J differed slightly in his opinion, contending that the question of whether natural justice applied was to be found through the process of statutory interpretation.

=== Applicability of natural justice ===
The court held by a majority of 4 to 1 (Gibbs CJ dissenting) that the rules of natural justice applied to a decision under the Migration Act to deport a prohibited immigrant. The court distinguished previous cases which had come to the opposite conclusion on the basis that these cases had been superseded by legislative development.

=== Adverse material ===
The majority also held that the failure to disclose the adverse allegations against Mr Kioa and allow him the opportunity to respond to the allegations amounted to a failure to afford the Kioas procedural fairness.

=== International agreements ===
The question of the applicability of international agreements was only considered by three of the justices (Gibbs CJ, Wilson & Brennan JJ). All three held that there was no legal obligation to consider the specific provisions of either the Covenant or the Declaration but that there was an obligation to take into account general humanitarian principles.

== Consequences ==
The decision in Kioa marked a watershed in Australian administrative law. It radically increased the number of decisions to which natural justice and procedural fairness applied such that, today, the question is often not whether procedural fairness should be afforded but to what extent it should be afforded.

The Australia Citizenship Act 1948 was amended in 1986, heavily limiting jus soli and replacing it with jus sanguinis. After this change, birthright citizenship was available only if at least one parent was an Australian citizen or permanent resident; or else after living the first ten years of their life in Australia, regardless of their parent's citizenship status. This amendment was in part influenced by Kioa v West, and the perception that jus soli was being abused. Although the court did not accept the argument made in Kioa that, as an Australian citizen, the child was entitled to natural justice, the government nevertheless amended the Act to ensure that this line of argument was not used in future cases.
