= List of law schools attended by Australian High Court justices =

There have been 49 men and seven women who have been appointed as justices of the High Court of Australia. Together, the judges are alumni of six Australian universities, two universities in the United Kingdom, three in the United States of America and one Barristers' Admission Board.

== Australia ==
=== University of Sydney ===
- Sydney Law School – 20 alumni
  1. H. V. Evatt (Bachelor of Laws and Doctor of Laws)
  2. Edward McTiernan (Bachelor of Laws)
  3. George Rich (Bachelor of Laws)
  4. Dudley Williams (Bachelor of Laws)
  5. Frank Kitto (Bachelor of Laws)
  6. Alan Taylor (Bachelor of Laws)
  7. Victor Windeyer (Bachelor of Laws)
  8. Garfield Barwick (Bachelor of Laws)
  9. Cyril Walsh (Bachelor of Laws)
  10. Anthony Mason (Bachelor of Laws)
  11. Kenneth Jacobs (Bachelor of Laws)
  12. Lionel Murphy (Bachelor of Laws)
  13. William Deane (Bachelor of Laws)
  14. Mary Gaudron (Bachelor of Laws)
  15. William Gummow (Bachelor of Laws and Master of Laws)
  16. Michael Kirby (Bachelor of Laws and Master of Laws)
  17. Murray Gleeson (Bachelor of Laws)
  18. Susan Crennan (Bachelor of Laws)
  19. Virginia Bell (Bachelor of Laws)
  20. Jacqueline Gleeson (Bachelor of Laws)
  21. Jayne Jagot (Bachelor of Laws)

=== University of Melbourne ===
- Melbourne Law School – 14 alumni
  1. Isaac Isaacs
  2. H. B. Higgins
  3. Frank Gavan Duffy
  4. Hayden Starke
  5. Owen Dixon
  6. John Latham
  7. Wilfred Fullagar
  8. Douglas Menzies
  9. Ninian Stephen
  10. Keith Aickin
  11. Daryl Dawson – also completed a Master of Laws from Yale Law School
  12. Kenneth Hayne – also completed a Bachelor of Civil Law from Oxford
  13. Geoffrey Nettle – also completed a Bachelor of Civil Law from Oxford
  14. Simon Steward

=== University of Queensland ===
- University of Queensland – 6 alumni
  1. Charles Powers
  2. William Webb
  3. Harry Gibbs
  4. Gerard Brennan
  5. Ian Callinan
  6. Patrick Keane – also completed a Bachelor of Civil Law from Oxford

=== University of Western Australia ===
- University of Western Australia – 5 alumni
  1. Ronald Wilson – also completed a Master of Laws from the University of Pennsylvania
  2. John Toohey
  3. Robert French
  4. Michelle Gordon
  5. James Edelman – also completed a Doctor of Philosophy from Oxford.

=== Australian National University ===
- Australian National University College of Law – 2 alumni
  1. Stephen Gageler – also completed a Master of Laws from Harvard
  2. Robert Beech-Jones

== United Kingdom ==
=== University of Cambridge ===
- University of Cambridge – 2 alumni
  1. Adrian Knox
  2. Susan Kiefel

=== University of Oxford ===
- University of Oxford – 5 alumni
  1. Dyson Heydon
  2. Patrick Keane
  3. Geoffrey Nettle
  4. Kenneth Hayne
  5. James Edelman

== United States ==
=== Harvard University ===
- Harvard Law School – 1 alumnus
  1. Stephen Gageler

=== University of Pennsylvania ===
- University of Pennsylvania – 1 alumnus
  1. Ronald Wilson

=== Yale University ===
- Yale Law School – 1 alumnus
  1. Daryl Dawson

== No formal law school ==
- New South Wales Legal Profession Admission Board – 2 alumni
  1. Michael McHugh
  2. Susan Kiefel – also completed a Master of Laws from Cambridge

== See also ==
- List of universities in Australia
- List of law schools in Australia
- Tertiary education in Australia
