= Order of precedence in Australia =

Relative preeminence of officials for ceremonial purposes

Australia has several orders of precedence that depends on whether an event is organised by the Commonwealth or a state. This is a reflection of the continuing partial sovereignty of the states.

== Commonwealth order of precedence ==
The following is the federal order of precedence for Australia:

1. King of Australia: King Charles III (Note: While the monarch is not listed in the official order of precedence, in practice they are accorded the highest precedence. No previous official order of precedence included the monarch either; however until 1975 the official order included the note that the precedence of those not listed "who are entitled to precedence in the United Kingdom or other parts of the Empire, or in foreign countries, in relation to the above mentioned Officers [is] to be determined as a matter of courtesy by the Governor-General".)
2. Governor-General of Australia: Sam Mostyn
3. Governor of the State when within their own State.
4. Governors of the other (or all) States in order of appointment:
  1. Governor of New South Wales: Margaret Beazley (2 May 2019)
  2. Governor of Tasmania: Barbara Baker (16 June 2021)
  3. Governor of South Australia: Frances Adamson (7 October 2021)
  4. Governor of Queensland: Jeannette Young (1 November 2021)
  5. Governor of Western Australia: Chris Dawson (15 July 2022)
  6. Governor of Victoria: Margaret Gardner (9 August 2023)
5. When within the Northern Territory, the Administrator of the Northern Territory: Hugh Heggie (2 February 2023)
6. Prime Minister: Anthony Albanese
7. When within their own State or Territory, the Premier of the State or the Chief Minister of the Territory
8. The President of the Senate and the Speaker of the House of Representatives in order of election (if they are elected at the same time, the President of the Senate takes precedence):
  1. President of the Senate: Senator Sue Lines (26 July 2022)
  2. Speaker of the House of Representatives: Milton Dick (26 July 2022)
9. Chief Justice of Australia: Stephen Gageler
10. Senior diplomatic posts:
  1. Ambassadors and High Commissioners in order of date of presentation of the Letters of Credence or Commission
  2. Chargés d'affaires en pied or en titre in order of date of presentation of the Letters of Credence or Commission
  3. Chargés d'affaires ad interim and Acting High Commissioners in order of date of assumption of duties
11. Members of the Federal Executive Council under summons (in practice, this is all current Ministers and Assistant Ministers of the Commonwealth of Australia):
  1. Ministry List
12. The Administrator of the Northern Territory: Hugh Heggie
13. The Leader of the Opposition: Angus Taylor (13 February 2026)
14. Former holders of high offices:
  1. Former governors-general in order of leaving office:
    1. Sir William Deane (1996–2001)
    2. Dame Quentin Bryce (2008–2014)
    3. General Sir Peter Cosgrove (2014–2019)
    4. David Hurley (2019–2024)
  2. Former prime ministers in order of leaving office:
    1. Paul Keating (1991–1996)
    2. John Howard (1996–2007)
    3. Kevin Rudd (2007–2010, 2013)
    4. Julia Gillard (2010–2013)
    5. Tony Abbott (2013–2015)
    6. Malcolm Turnbull (2015–2018)
    7. Scott Morrison (2018–2022)
  3. Former chief justices in order of leaving office:
    1. Murray Gleeson (1998–2008)
    2. Robert French (2008–2017)
    3. Susan Kiefel (2017–2023)
15. Premiers of states in order of state populations, then chief ministers of the territories in order of territory populations:
  1. Premier of New South Wales: Chris Minns
  2. Premier of Victoria: Ben Carroll
  3. Premier of Queensland: David Crisafulli
  4. Premier of Western Australia: Roger Cook
  5. Premier of South Australia: Peter Malinauskas
  6. Premier of Tasmania: Jeremy Rockliff
  7. Chief Minister of the Australian Capital Territory: Andrew Barr
  8. Chief Minister of the Northern Territory: Lia Finocchiaro
16. The lord mayor when within their jurisdiction
17. Justices of the High Court in order of appointment:
  1. Michelle Gordon (9 June 2015)
  2. James Edelman (30 January 2017)
  3. Simon Steward (1 December 2020)
  4. Jacqueline Sarah Gleeson (1 March 2021)
  5. Jayne Jagot (17 October 2022)
  6. Robert Beech-Jones (6 November 2023)
18. Senior judges:
  1. Chief justice of the Federal Court of Australia: Debra Mortimer
  2. Chief justice of the Federal Circuit Court of Australia (Division 1; the former Family Court of Australia): Will Alstergren
  3. Chief judge of the Federal Circuit and Family Court of Australia (Division 2; the former Federal Circuit Court of Australia): Jointly held with the above by Will Alstergren
19. The chief justice of the Supreme Court of the (Australian) jurisdiction
20. The other chief justices of the Supreme Courts of the States and Territories in order of appointment (where the lieutenant-governor of the states is not also Chief Justice, they take precedence immediately after that State's chief justice) :
  1. Chief Justice of the Supreme Court of the Northern Territory: Michael Grant (5 July 2016)
  2. Chief Justice of the Supreme Court of Western Australia: Peter Quinlan (13 August 2018)
  3. Chief Justice of the Supreme Court of New South Wales: Andrew Bell (7 March 2022)
  4. Chief Justice of the Supreme Court of the Australian Capital Territory: Lucy McCallum (8 March 2022)
  5. Chief Justice of the Supreme Court of Queensland: Helen Bowskill (19 March 2022)
  6. Chief Justice of the Supreme Court of Tasmania: Chris Shanahan (20 January 2025)
  7. Chief Justice of the Supreme Court of Victoria: Richard Niall (3 February 2025)
  8. Chief Justice of the Supreme Court of South Australia: Laura Stein (19 February 2026)
21. Australian members of the Privy Council in order of appointment:
  1. Ian Sinclair (17 January 1977)
  2. Sir William Heseltine (26 March 1986)
22. The chief of the Defence Force (Admiral David Johnston)
23. Chief judges of State and Territory courts in order of their appointment to any of their respective jurisdictions' courts
24. Members of parliament (see Members of the Australian Senate, 2025–2028 and Members of the Australian House of Representatives, 2025–2028)
25. Presidents of federal tribunals:
  1. President of the Fair Work Commission: Adam Hatcher SC
  2. President of the Administrative Review Tribunal: Emilios Kyrou
26. Other judges of federal, state and territory courts in order of their appointment to any of their respective jurisdictions' courts
27. Lord mayors of capital cities in order of city populations:
  1. Lord mayor of Sydney: Councillor Clover Moore
  2. Lord mayor of Melbourne: Councillor Nicholas Reece
  3. Lord mayor of Brisbane: Councillor Adrian Schrinner
  4. Lord mayor of Perth: Bruce Reynolds
  5. Lord mayor of Adelaide: Dr Jane Lomax-Smith
  6. Lord mayor of Hobart: Councillor Anna Reynolds
  7. Lord mayor of Darwin: Lord Mayor of Darwin, Kon Vatskalis
28. Heads of religious communities according to the date of assuming office in Australia
29. The presiding officer(s) of the state legislature when in their own jurisdiction.
30. Presiding officers of the other (or all) state legislatures in order of appointment, then presiding officer of territory legislatures in order of appointment:
  1. President of the Tasmanian Legislative Council: Craig Farrell (21 May 2019)
  2. President of the Western Australian Legislative Council: Alanna Clohesy (25 May 2021)
  3. President of the South Australian Legislative Council: Terry Stephens (3 May 2022)
  4. Speaker of the Victorian Legislative Assembly: Maree Edwards (2 August 2022)
  5. President of the Victorian Legislative Council: Shaun Leane (20 December 2022)
  6. President of the New South Wales Legislative Council: Ben Franklin (9 May 2023)
  7. Speaker of the New South Wales Legislative Assembly: Greg Piper (9 May 2023)
  8. Speaker of the South Australian House of Assembly: Leon Bignell (11 April 2024)
  9. Speaker of the Legislative Assembly of Queensland: Pat Weir (26 November 2024)
  10. Speaker of the Western Australian Legislative Assembly: Stephen Price (8 April 2025)
  11. Speaker of the Tasmanian House of Assembly: Jacquie Petrusma (19 August 2025)
  12. Speaker of the Northern Territory Legislative Assembly: Robyn Lambley (15 October 2024)
  13. Speaker of the Australian Capital Territory Legislative Assembly: Mark Parton (6 November 2024)
31. The members of the particular State Executive Council under summons (in practice, the ministers and assistant ministers of the government of the State), then the members of the other State Executive Councils in order of state populations, and then the ministers of the Australian Capital Territory and then members of the Northern Territory Executive Council:
  1. Executive Council of New South Wales (Minns ministry)
  2. Executive Council of Victoria (Allan ministry)
  3. Executive Council of Queensland (Crisafulli ministry)
  4. Executive Council of Western Australia (Cook ministry)
  5. Executive Council of South Australia (Malinauskas ministry)
  6. Executive Council of Tasmania (Third Rockliff ministry)
  7. Ministers of the Australian Capital Territory (Fourth Barr ministry)
  8. Executive Council of the Northern Territory (Finocchiaro ministry)
32. The Leader of the Opposition of the particular State, and then Leaders of the Opposition of State Legislatures in order of state populations, then Leaders of the Opposition in Territory Legislatures in order of territory populations:
  1. Leader of the Opposition of New South Wales: Kellie Sloane
  2. Leader of the Opposition of Victoria: Jess Wilson
  3. Leader of the Opposition of Queensland: Steven Miles
  4. Leader of the Opposition of Western Australia: Basil Zempilas
  5. Leader of the Opposition of South Australia: Vincent Tarzia
  6. Leader of the Opposition of Tasmania: Josh Willie
  7. Leader of the Opposition of the Australian Capital Territory: Mark Parton
  8. Leader of the Opposition of the Northern Territory: Selena Uibo
33. Members of the Federal Executive Council not under summons (in practice, all past ministers and assistant ministers)
34. Members of the particular State or Territory legislature, and then Members of State and Territory Legislatures in order of population:
  1. New South Wales Legislative Assembly (Members 2023–2027) and Legislative Council (Members 2023–2027)
  2. Victorian Legislative Assembly (Members 2022–2026) and Legislative Council (Members 2022–2026)
  3. Legislative Assembly of Queensland (Members 2024–2028)
  4. Western Australian Legislative Assembly (Members 2025–2029) and Legislative Council (Members 2025–2029)
  5. South Australian House of Assembly (Members 2022–2026) and Legislative Council (Members 2022–2026)
  6. Tasmanian House of Assembly (Members 2025–2029) and Legislative Council (Members 2023–2029)
  7. Australian Capital Territory Legislative Assembly (Members 2024–2028)
  8. Northern Territory Legislative Assembly (Members 2024–2028)
35. The Secretaries of Departments of the Australian Public Service and their peers and the Chiefs of the Air Force, Army, and Navy in order of first appointment to this group:
  1. Chief of Army: Lieutenant General Simon Stuart (2 July 2022)
  2. Chief of Navy: Vice Admiral Mark Hammond (6 July 2022)
  3. Chief of Air Force: Air Marshal Stephen Chappell (3 July 2024)
36. Consuls-General, Consuls and Vice-Consuls according to the date on which recognition was granted
37. Recipients of awards and honours, at or above the Knight Bachelor, precedence being established according to the Australian honours order of wearing, and recipients of equivalent awards according to the date on which the award was announced.

=== Notes ===
- The Location of Officials matters for precedence; an official enjoys different precedence within and without his or her state.
- Anyone who is acting on behalf of one of the above takes the precedence of whoever they are acting for, however where they fall within a class of people with equal precedence, they take the lowest precedence within that class.
- A couple takes the highest precedence of their spouse/partner. For example, Simeon Beckett (spouse of Governor-General Sam Mostyn) has equal precedence to the Governor-General.
- The recipients of Decorations or Honours gain precedence in the order of Seniority or Superiority of the Orders themselves; the Orders of Knighthood in Australia have the same seniority as in the United Kingdom, with a few insertions or promotions of entirely Australian, non-British honours; see Australian Honours Order of Wearing.
- Until 2022, no reference was made to the Chief Minister, the Leader of the Opposition or the Speaker of the Australian Capital Territory. This appeared to be an oversight after the ACT was granted self government. A new Table of Precedence was gazetted on 1 September 2022 which included the ACT.

== State orders of precedence ==
Each of the Australian states (apart from Western Australia) also publishes an order of precedence that differs from the Commonwealth order of precedence, generally with the relevant premier and state officials given higher precedence compared to federal officials.
