= Farm Transparency International v New South Wales =

- Court: High Court of Australia
- Full case name: Farm Transparency International Ltd & Anor v. State of New South Wales
- Decided: 10 August 2022
- Citation: [2022] HCA 23
- Transcripts: 27 Sep 2021 [2021] HCATrans 151; 10 Feb 2022 [2022] HCATrans 5; 11 Feb 2022 [2022] HCATrans 6

Court membership
- Judges sitting: Kiefel CJ, Gageler, Keane, Gordon, Edelman, Steward, Glesson JJ

Case opinions
- Sections 11 and 12 of the Surveillance Devices Act 2007 do not impermissibly burden the freedom of political communication

Farm Transparency International v New South Wales (Farm Transparency) was a case heard by the High Court of Australia, which held that sections 11 and 12 of the Surveillance Devices Act 2007 of New South Wales do not impermissibly burden the freedom of political communication.

== Background ==
Farm Transparency International is a non-profit charity that seeks to raise public awareness of animal cruelty, and is "dedicated to ending the abuse and exploitation of animals". The organisation engages in the publication of photographs and videos of animal agricultural practices in Australia, including in New South Wales to further their aims of advocating for changes to animal welfare standards and practices.

The second plaintiff in the case was Chris Delforce, a director of Farm Transparency International, and a member of the Animal Justice Party, participated "in the entry onto the property of others to install, use or maintain an optical surveillance device to record the carrying out of an activity on the premises without the consent of the owner or occupier of the premises".

Section 11 of the Surveillance Devices Act 2007 prohibits the publication or communication of private conversations and reports of such conversations, as well as records and reports of activities, that have come to be known due to the use of a surveillance device, including listening, optical surveillance, and tracking devices. Section 12 of the Act prohibits the possession of a record of a private conversation or activity if it was knowingly obtained using a surveillance device. Further, Section 8 prohibits the installation of an optical surveillance device if it involves trespass.

== Decision ==
The High Court's decision was handed down on 10 August 2022, with its reasons published the same day. In the judgment summary, the Court stated that they held:

that ss 11 and 12 of the SD Act did not impermissibly burden the implied freedom in their application to, respectively, the communication or publication by a person of a record or report, or the possession by a person of a record, of the carrying on of a lawful activity, at least where the person was complicit in the record or report being obtained exclusively by breach of s 8 of the SD Act.

The Court found that ss 11 and 12 achieved an adequate balance between the protection of privacy and the adverse effect on the freedom of political communication.
