= BHP Group Limited v Impiombato =

2022 High Court case

- Court: High Court of Australia
- Full case name: BHP Group Ltd v. Vince Impiombato & Anor
- Decided: 12 October 2022
- Citation: [2022] HCA 33
- Transcripts: 18 Feb 2022 [2022] HCATrans 13; 9 Aug 2022 [2022] HCATrans 124

Court membership
- Judges sitting: Kiefel CJ, Gageler, Gordon, Edelman, Steward

Case opinions
- Part IVA of the Federal Court of Australia Act 1976 permits representative proceedings to be brought on behalf of group members who are not resident in Australia

BHP Group Limited v Impiombato was a case heard by the High Court of Australia in 2022, which held that foreign residents can be group members in an Australian class action.

== Background ==
In November 2015, the Fundão dam in Brazil, owned by a joint venture between BHP and Vale, ruptured, resulting in the Mariana dam disaster. The village of Bentro Rodrigues was almost entirely flooded by toxic water and mud. The final death toll was 19, with more than 16 injured.

A class action was lodged in May 2018 in the Federal Court under Part IVA of the Federal Court of Australia Act 1976 by people who contracted to acquire an interest in fully paid-up ordinary shares in BHP through various international stock exchanges. The members of the class action alleged that they suffered loss due to BHP's contravention of continuous disclosure obligations as set out by the Australian Securities Exchange Listing Rules and the Corporations Act 2001. They further alleged that they suffered loss due to BHP acting in misleading or deceptive conduct, disallowed under the Australian Securities and Investments Commission Act 2001 and the Corporations Act.

In 2020, in Impiombato v BHP Group Ltd (No 2), Justice Moshinsky of the Federal Court refused BHP's application to strike the claims of group members in the class action who were not residents of Australia. BHP applied and was granted special leave to appeal to the High Court of Australia.

== Decision ==
The High Court's decision was handed down on 12 October 2022, with its reasons published the same day. In the published reasons, the Court asked why "If a person in the pool can become a representative party irrespective of their place of residence, as BHP accepts, why can a person in the pool become a group member only if resident in Australia?". The Court found that Part IVA of the Federal Court of Australia Act does not geographically or territorially restrict the ability of a person to be a part of a class action. BHP's argument that section 21(1)(b) of the Acts Interpretation Act 1901 and the common law presumption against extraterritoriality should both be applied to this case so that Part IVA must be interpreted as not permitting group members who are not resident in Australia was unanimously rejected.
