= Love v Commonwealth =

2020 case in High Court of Australia

Love v Commonwealth; Thoms v Commonwealth
- Commonwealth Coat of Arms
- Court: High Court of Australia
- Full case name: Love and The Commonwealth of Australia; Thoms and The Commonwealth of Australia
- Decided: 11 February 2020
- Citations: [2020] HCA 3; (2020) 270 CLR 152
- Transcripts: 8 May 2019; 5 December 2019

Court membership
- Judges sitting: Chief Justice Susan Kiefel; Justice Virginia Bell; Justice Stephen Gageler; Justice Patrick Keane; Justice Geoffrey Nettle; Justice Michelle Gordon; Justice James Edelman

Case opinions
- Aboriginal Australians do not fall under the ambit of the Commonwealth Parliament's power, under section 51(xix) of the Constitution, to legislate in regard to "aliens" (per Bell, Nettle, Gordon and Edelman; Kiefel, Gageler and Keane dissenting).; As Thoms is an Aboriginal Australian and therefore not an alien, the Commonwealth does not have the power to deport him under the provisions of the Migration Act 1958 (per Bell, Nettle, Gordon and Edelman).; On the facts before them, the Court was unable by majority to determine whether or not Love was an Aboriginal Australian.

Area of law
- Constitutional law

Love v Commonwealth; Thoms v Commonwealth is a decision of the High Court of Australia. It is an important case in Australian constitutional law, deciding that Aboriginal Australians are not "aliens" for the purposes of section 51(xix) of the Constitution. The case was decided on 11 February 2020.

The High Court delivered its judgements on both Love v Commonwealth and Thoms v Commonwealth as one due to the virtually identical facts of both cases.

== Background ==
Daniel Love and Brendan Thoms were men who had failed their migration character tests as a result of serving jail sentences. Neither Love nor Thoms was an Australian citizen, but both identified as Aboriginal Australians. The government was trying to deport both men as aliens under the provisions of the Migration Act 1958, based on a 2014 amendment of the Act.

Love was a recognised member of the Kamilaroi people who was born in Papua New Guinea. He had been placed in immigration detention after he was sentenced to more than a year in jail for assault occasioning actual bodily harm. His permanent residency visa was revoked by Home Affairs Minister Peter Dutton, but this was later overturned and he was released from detention.

Thoms was a native title holder and a member of the Gunggari people who was born in New Zealand. He was also placed in immigration detention after serving part of an 18-month sentence for domestic violence. He remained in detention until the judgment was handed down.

The two men were aged in their 30s and 40s at the time of the court case. Both had lived in Australia since they were small children, and had close family in Australia. Both men were legal Australian permanent residents prior to their jail sentences.

The Attorney-General for the State of Victoria intervened and made submissions in support of both Love and Thoms. It argued that Aboriginality is equivalent to citizenship, on the basis the unique relationship between members of Aboriginal societies and the land and waters of Australia meant that Aboriginal Australians could not be considered "aliens" for the purposes of s 51(xix) of the Constitution.

== Decision ==
In the judgment, each justice issued a separate opinion. A majority of the Court (Bell, Nettle, Gordon and Edelman) found that Aboriginal Australians (understood according to the tripartite test in Mabo v Queensland (No 2)) were not within the reach of the "aliens" power conferred by section 51(xix) of the Constitution.

As Thoms had already been recognised as an Aboriginal Australian through his native title claim, the majority of the Court determined that he was not an alien. This meant that the power to deport non-citizens under the Migration Act 1958 could not be exercised against him. The majority could not, however, determine whether Love was an Aboriginal Australian and remitted the matter to the Federal Court to deal with that question.

=== Dissenting opinions ===
Kiefel and Gageler and Keane each delivered dissenting opinions.

Kiefel criticised Edelman who in his judgement argued that it would create a "hopeless and incoherent contradiction" within the legal system if despite the recognition of native title Aboriginal Australians could be treated as aliens. She stated that it would be wrong to assume that a connection to land, necessary for native title, could be used in a completely different area of the law, and that race is irrelevant to questions of citizenship.

Justice Gageler said he was opposed to the “judicial creation of any race-based constitutional distinction”, and that such a distinction, if it was to be created, should be created by a referendum. He argued that citizenship and alienage are mutually exclusive, and that it was within the power of parliament to define these and not to be justiciable. Keane expressed similar concerns about a race based limitation.

All three dissenting justices found no basis to limit parliament's power to determine alienage. They implied that the majority's decision recognised a competing Aboriginal sovereignty, which was carefully rejected in the Mabo decision. Kiefel and Kean said that the determination by Aboriginal elders of Aboriginality would prevent parliament from designating such people as aliens, thus creating a sovereignty which was rejected by Mabo (No. 2) ("Indigenous people are part of the people of Australia"). Mabo is limited to native title law and geographically limited, only applying to Indigenous groups and their specific to particular lands. They concluded that Aboriginal Australians can be aliens, and as the plaintiffs were not citizens, they could be deported.

== Consequences ==
The following day, Christian Porter, then Attorney-General of Australia, said the decision created "an entirely new category of people in terms of what the government can and can't do" a non-citizen non-alien, or "belonger". Porter said that the government would be looking to deport the small group of Aboriginal non-citizens who have committed serious offences in a different way. Peter Dutton described the decision as "a very bad thing" that would be "exploited by lawyers", and said he had sought legal advice from the Department of Home Affairs that would be "looking to restrict the damage".

Constitutional law professor Anne Twomey said that it was too early to tell what the ramifications would be, especially in light of the fact that each of the seven-person bench had given individual reasonings. The Law Council of Australia said that a number of "complex issues" had been raised, and would give rise to a great deal of debate and scrutiny.

Wamba Wamba lawyer Eddie Synot of the Indigenous Law Centre at the University of New South Wales said the judgment concerned a "very narrow application of the aliens power" and explicitly stated that it was not a recognition of Aboriginal sovereignty.

== Related cases ==
On 8 June 2022, the High Court delivered its judgment in Thoms v Commonwealth. It held that Thoms' detention under the Migration Act had not been unlawful, despite him being an Aboriginal Australian (and therefore a non-alien) at the time. According the majority of the Court (Kiefel, Keane and Gleeson, with whom Gageler and Steward generally agreed), this was because the power in section 51(xix) of the Constitution supports laws which authorise the detention of persons who are "reasonably suspected" of being an alien (applying the Court's earlier decision in Ruddick v Taylor). Because the officers who had detained Thoms could not have reasonably predicted the Court's decision in Love v Commonwealth, their suspicion that he was an alien was held to be objectively reasonable in the circumstances.

The Commonwealth Government subsequently sought to overturn the precedent of the High Court's decision in Love v Commonwealth in Minister for Immigration, Citizenship, Migrant Services and Multicultural Affairs v Montgomery, a case in involving a New Zealand citizen culturally adopted as Aboriginal. However, the Commonwealth's appeal was ultimately discontinued on 28 July 2022, following the election of the Albanese Labor Government in the 2022 Australian federal election.

== See also ==
- Australian Aboriginal identity
- Australian constitutional law
