= List of chief justices of Australia by time in office =

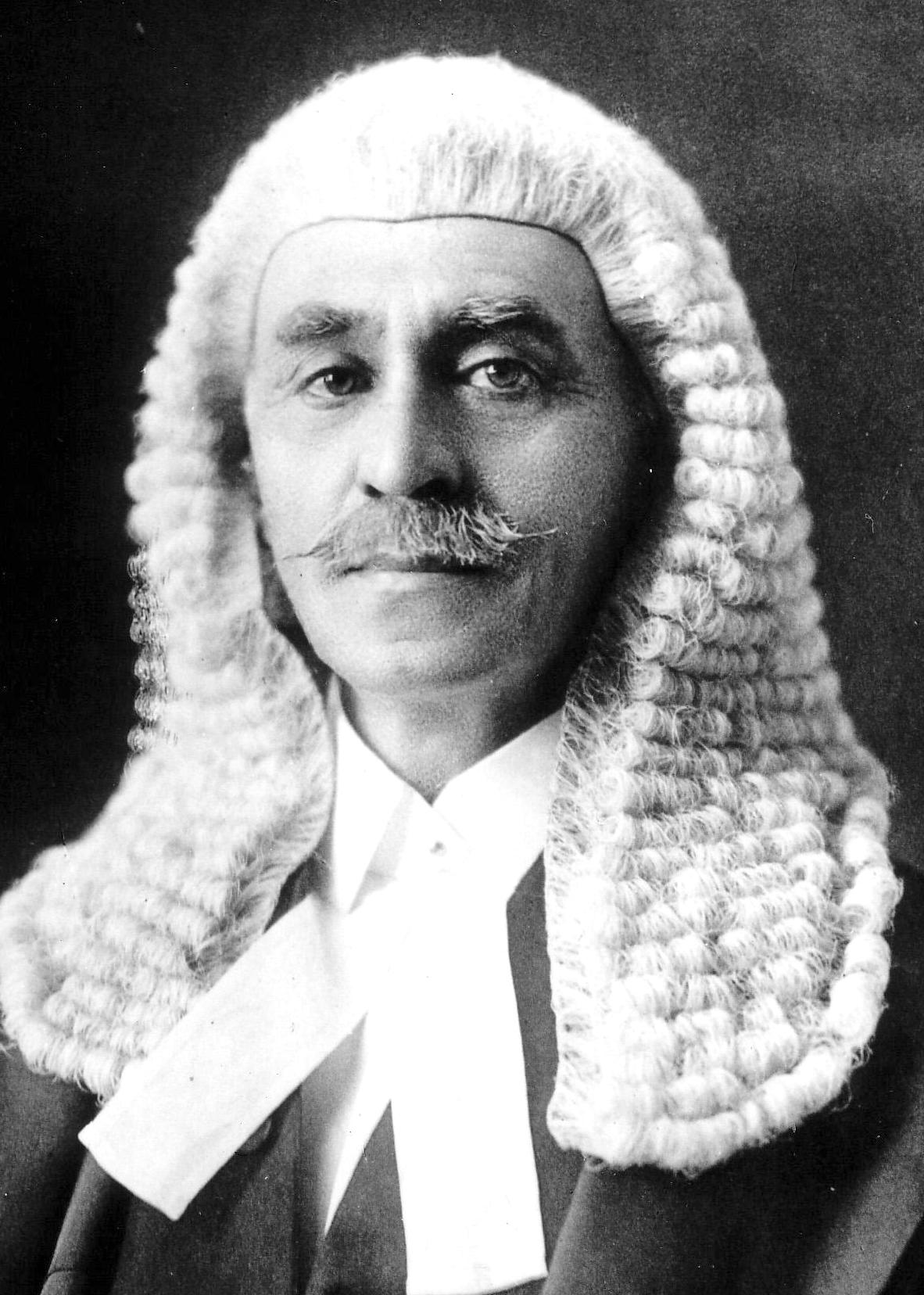
294 days Sir Isaac Isaacs Shortest serving Chief Justice: 1930 - 1931

This is a list of Australian chief justices by time in office.

== Chief justices of Australia ==
Rank by length of term	Chief Justice	Appointed by	Date of appointment	Date of retirement	Length of term	Length of retirement	Date of death	Order by date
1	Garfield Barwick	Menzies	27 April 1964	11 February 1981	16 years, 290 days	16 years, 153 days	14 July 1997	7
2	John Latham	Lyons	11 October 1935	7 April 1952	16 years, 179 days	12 years, 109 days	25 July 1964	5
3	Samuel Griffith	Deakin	5 October 1903	17 October 1919	16 years, 12 days	297 days	9 August 1920	1
4	Owen Dixon	Menzies	18 April 1952	13 April 1964	11 years, 361 days	8 years, 85 days	7 July 1972	6
5	Adrian Knox	Hughes	18 October 1919	31 March 1930	10 years, 164 days	2 years, 27 days	27 April 1932	2
6	Murray Gleeson	Howard	22 May 1998	29 August 2008	10 years, 99 days	17 years, 325 days		11
7	Robert French	Rudd	1 September 2008	29 January 2017	8 years, 150 days	9 years, 172 days		12
8	Anthony Mason	Hawke	6 February 1987	20 April 1995	8 years, 73 days	31 years, 91 days		9
9	Susan Kiefel	Turnbull	30 January 2017	5 November 2023	6 years, 279 days	2 years, 257 days		13
10	Harry Gibbs	Fraser	12 February 1981	5 February 1987	5 years, 358 days	18 years, 140 days	25 June 2005	8
11	Frank Gavan Duffy	Scullin	22 January 1931	1 October 1935	4 years, 252 days	302 days	29 July 1936	4
12	Gerard Brennan	Keating	21 April 1995	21 May 1998	3 years, 30 days	24 years, 11 days	1 June 2022	10
13	Stephen Gageler	Albanese	6 November 2023	Incumbent	2 years, 256 days			14
14	Isaac Isaacs	Scullin	2 April 1930	21 January 1931	294 days	17 years, 21 days	11 February 1948	3

== See also ==
- List of justices of the High Court of Australia
