= Kakavas v Crown Melbourne Ltd =

Judgement of the High Court of Australia

- Court: High Court of Australia
- Full case name: Kakavas v Crown Melbourne Ltd
- Decided: 5 June 2013
- Citations: [2013] HCA 25; 250 CLR 392

Case history
- Prior actions: Kakavas v Crown Melbourne Ltd [2009] VSC 559; Kakavas v Crown Melbourne Ltd [2012] VSCA 95
- Subsequent action: none

Court membership
- Judges sitting: French CJ, Hayne, Crennan, Kiefel, Bell, Gageler and Keane JJ

Kakavas v Crown Melbourne Ltd & Ors [2013] HCA 25 is a landmark Australian judgment of the High Court. The matter related to claims that the casino had taken unfair or unconscientious advantage of the opportunity created by a patron's special disadvantage, being a gambling problem.

Harry Kakavas – a known problem gambler who had a gambling turnover of $1.5 billion and losses of $20.5 million – claimed Melbourne's Crown Casino had engaged in unconscionable conduct by "luring" him into the casino with incentives and the use of the casino's private jet. In earlier proceedings it had also been claimed that Crown owed a duty of care to a patron with a known gambling problem, and that Crown lured or enticed him into its casino.

The High Court, in a joint judgement, approved the observation by the primary judge that "[i]n the absence of a relevant legislative provision, there is no general duty upon a casino to protect gamblers from themselves." The Court found that Kakavas wasn't at a special disadvantage which made him susceptible to exploitation by Crown and was able to make rational decisions in his own interests, including deciding to refrain from gambling altogether. Crown did not knowingly victimise Kavakas by allowing him to gamble at its casino.
