= Cesan v The Queen =

Judgement of the High Court of Australia

- Court: High Court of Australia
- Full case name: Cesan v The Queen; Mas Rivadavia v The Queen
- Decided: 3 September 2008
- Citations: [2008] HCA 52, (2008) 236 CLR 358
- Transcripts: 16 May [2008] HCATrans 191; 3 Sep [2008] HCATrans 320

Case history
- Prior actions: Cesan v DPP (Cth) [2007] NSWCCA 273, (2007) 174 A Crim R 385

Court membership
- Judges sitting: French CJ, Gummow, Hayne, Heydon, Crennan and Kiefel JJ

Case opinions
- 1. Appeals allowed.; 2. Convictions quashed and retrial ordered.

Cesan v The Queen was a decision handed down in the High Court of Australia on 3 September 2008 quashing the convictions of two men for conspiring to import a commercial quantity of narcotics because the trial judge was asleep during parts of the trial. The Court subsequently delivered reasons for its decision on 6 November 2008.

The appellants were convicted in the District Court of New South Wales of conspiring to import a commercial quantity of the drug ecstasy. On appeal to the Court of Criminal Appeal of the Supreme Court of New South Wales, it was alleged that the trial judge had been asleep during some parts of the trial when evidence was being given. While the Court of Criminal Appeal found that the judge "was nodding off and on occasion actually asleep from time to time during the trial", it said that this did not necessarily mean that there had been a miscarriage of justice. The Court held (by a 2:1 majority) that "there was no failure of process of such a kind as to make it impossible for the Court to decide that the convictions were just" and accordingly upheld the convictions.

The High Court granted the appellants special leave to appeal on 16 May 2008. The appeal was heard before the Full Court on 3 September 2008 which gave orders allowing the appeals, quashing the convictions and remitting the cases for retrials. The Court indicated that it would publish its reasons at a later date.

== See also ==
- List of High Court of Australia cases
