= UWA Law School =

Law school in Perth, Western Australia

- Parent school: University of Western Australia
- Established: 1927
- School type: Public
- Dean: Sharon Mascher
- Location: Perth, Western Australia, Australia
- Faculty: Faculty of Arts, Business, Law and Education
- Website: UWA Law School

The UWA Law School is the law school of the University of Western Australia in Perth, Western Australia.

== History ==
The UWA Law School was established in 1927, and is the fifth-oldest law school in Australia. In 2020, UWA Law School was ranked among the top 100 law schools in the world by QS World University Rankings and Times Higher Education, and thus is one of the highest ranked Australian law schools.

== UWA Law Review ==
The UWA Law School publishes the UWA Law Review. Founded in 1948, it is the oldest university law review in Australia.

== Notable alumni ==
- Ben Wyatt (Treasurer of Western Australia, 2017–2021)
- Michelle Gordon AC (High Court Justice, 2015–present)
- James Edelman (High Court Justice, 2017–present)
- Malcolm McCusker AC CVO KC (Governor of Western Australia, 2011–2014)
- Stephen Smith (federal minister, 2007–2013)
- Christian Porter MP (federal minister, 2015–2021)
- Robert French AC (Chief Justice of Australia, 2008–2017)
- Sue Gordon AM (magistrate and public servant)
- Bob Hawke AC GCL (Prime Minister of Australia, 1983–1991)
