= McGinty v Western Australia =

Judgement of the High Court of Australia

- Court: High Court of Australia
- Full case name: McGinty & Ors v The State of Western Australia
- Citations: [1996] HCA 48, (1996) 186 CLR 140

Case opinions
- Majority: Brennan CJ, Dawson, Gaudron, McHugh and Gummow JJ
- Dissent: Toohey J

McGinty v Western Australia was a significant case decided in the High Court of Australia in 1996. The plaintiffs sought to enshrine the principle of ‘one vote, one value’ in the Australian Constitution, and has had a significant impact on how the High Court approaches matters of the franchise, as well as malapportionment. The plaintiff's submissions were unanimously rejected by the court, who found that the interpretation of sections 7 and 24 of the Australian Constitution did not require that all votes hold the same value. The High Court exercised its original jurisdiction in hearing the matter, meaning that the case did not need to proceed as an appeal from the Supreme Court of Western Australia.

== Background ==
=== Western Australian elections ===
The Western Australian Legislature is made up of a bicameral parliamentary system, a legislative council and a legislative assembly, established in 1890. By 1996 the assembly had 57 members, which were divided between 34 metropolitan seats, clustered in Perth, and 23 rural electoral divisions. The Electoral Distribution Commission determined the borders and number of electors in each division, guided by the Electoral Districts Act 1947 (WA) as amended by the Acts Amendments (Electoral Reform) Act 1987 (WA), which required that each area contain an equal number of electors plus or minus 15 per cent.

Western Australia is the largest state in Australia, comprising 2,529,875 square kilometres (976,790 sq mi), and by 2014 73% of the population lived in the capital of Perth. At the time of the enactment of the 1987 amendments 669,293 voters were enrolled in the metropolitan and 240,081 in the remainder of the state. As a result, in the 1993 elections the largest district for state electors held 291% of the number of electors in the smallest electorate. This is the phenomenon known as malapportionment, where there are significant divergences in the number of electors in electorates, leading to an unequal value of each vote. This should be distinguished from gerrymandering, which is a partisan manipulation of the borders of electorates to ensure an outcome.

The 1987 Amendments to the Electoral Districts Act 1947 (WA) also changed the way the legislative council, the state's upper house, was comprised. There were 34 available seats, which were distributed amongst six regions; "North Metropolitan Region (7 members), South Metropolitan Region (5 members), East Metropolitan Region (5 members), South West Region (7 members), Agricultural Region (5 members) and the Mining and Pastoral Region (5 members)". The populations of the regions for the 1993 election were; "North Metropolitan 34,161; South Metropolitan 33,876; East Metropolitan 32,822; South West 13,721; Agricultural 13,161; Mining and Pastoral 9,097". The disparities resulted in the North Metropolitan Region holding 376% of the population in the Mining and Pastoral Region, while only having two extra seats.

== The arguments ==
The questions to be resolved in

"(i) Is Section 6 of the Constitution Acts Amendment Act 1899 (WA) invalid?

(ii) Are Sections 2A(2), 6 and 9 of the Electoral Distribution Act 1947 (WA), or any of them, invalid?

(iii) If any of the Sections 2A(2), 6 or 9 of the Electoral Distribution Act 1947 (WA) is or are invalid, is it or are they severable and, if so, to what extent?"

The Plaintiffs argument rested on two primary grounds;

Representative democracy requires,

1. That every person with capacity have the right to vote; and
2. That each vote should be equal in importance.

The nature of this definition implies that there must be some restriction on voting, the determination of capacity is left to the legislature. The Plaintiffs argued that both the Commonwealth and Western Australian constitutions required that representative democracy be the starting point of any government structure in Australia. Brennan CJ noted that;

"In this century, the age of legal adulthood has been reduced from 21 to 18 and the legal incapacity of women to vote has been removed. Aborigines, who were once constitutionally disqualified from the franchise, are no longer so disqualified. But age, sex and race are not the only qualifications that have governed an adult's right to vote. Other qualifications have related to ownership of property and education or a period of residence within the electoral district. Disqualifications still include the status of convicted criminal and mental infirmity or absence from registered address. In view of the fact that the franchise has historically expanded in scope, it is at least arguable that the qualifications of age, sex, race and property which limited the franchise in earlier times could not now be reimposed so as to deprive a citizen of the right to vote."

The High Court had already accepted the general proposition that the Commonwealth Constitution did not require a 'one man one vote' test in Attorney General; Ex Rel McKinlay v The Commonwealth (1975) 135 CLR 1.

Alternatively, Western Australia argued that prior precedent weighed to the view that the proper construction of both the Western Australian Constitution and the Commonwealth Constitution did not require an equality of voting power. Western Australia also advanced the argument that a disparity in voting power did not necessarily preclude fairness in elections, as relying on strict majoritarianism can result in bad outcomes for minorities.

== Judgment ==
=== The majority ===
Brennan CJ, Dawson, Gaudron, McHugh and Gummow JJ formed the majority view that the first two of the three questions outlined above were to be answered in the negative, and as a result it was unnecessary to address the third. The majority largely took the view that whilst the principle of representative government was contained within the Commonwealth Constitution and the Western Australian Constitution it did not necessitate an equality of voting power. The majority made reference to ss 7 and 24 of the Commonwealth Constitution, which provides that the Senate and House of Representatives respectively will be "directly chosen by the people". Gummow J found that whilst these sections read with the rest of the Constitution did give rise to a requirement for a representative government; "It does not follow from the prescription by the Constitution of a system of representative government that a voting system with a particular characteristic or operation is required by the Constitution. What is necessary is the broadly identified requirement of ultimate control by the people, exercised by representatives who are elected periodically". Further, the proposed restriction of malapportionment did not entirely reduce the problem, which was near impossible and, "One consideration in [the decision] was that the challenged electoral distribution laws respectively permitted a similar and lesser degree of malapportionment than legislation in 1978 permitted. Accepting the plaintiffs' argument would entail that the 1978 Parliament was not itself 'chosen directly by the people'. In essence, the Western Australian Constitution was interpreted according to its legislative and historical context, and the phrase 'chosen directly by the people' did not give rise to a strict equality of value in voting. Gaudron J subscribed to some similar reasoning to the dissent of Toohey J, including how the historical realities of the Western Australian electoral system evolved; "Ultimately, it is a question of what is required in the light of current democratic standards, including those which so recently applied in Western Australia."

=== Dissent ===
Toohey J formed the sole dissent on the court. He considered that the words of the Commonwealth Constitution have varied over time, he noted that the High Court of Australia found that the connotation of the word jury had changed significantly over time in Cheatle v The Queen. Toohey J considered that if the court considered that the meaning of 'representative' juries had changed over time this should carry over into the constitutional meaning of 'directly chosen by the people'. Whilst this reasoning was similar to Gaudron J, the difference of judgments was the result of an analysis of the causative factors in the denial of franchise; i.e. was malapportionment considered as sufficiently serious as the historical denial of suffrage to oppressed minorities. Toohey J considered that "The point is that, while the essence of representative democracy remains unchanged, the method of giving expression to the concept varies over time and according to changes in society."

== Consequences ==
The 5-1 result in favour of The State of Western Australia answered question (i) (Is section 6 of the Constitution Acts Amendment Act 1899 (WA) invalid?) in the negative. Question (ii) (Are Sections 2A(2), 6 and 9 of the Electoral Distribution Act 1947 (WA), or any of them, invalid?) was similarly rejected, and question (iii) (If any of the Sections 2A(2), 6 or 9 of the Electoral Distribution Act 1947 (WA) is or are invalid, is it or are they severable and, if so, to what extent?) was unnecessary to consider. By ruling against the case, the High Court set the precedent that the phrase "directly chosen by the people" in ss 7 and 24 of the Constitution could not be construed to incorporate a principle of one vote, one value. The court has thus far declined to consider any other state constitutional amendments, or state parliaments, that have entrenched malapportioned electoral districts in their electoral map. The role of malapportionment in Australian politics remains strong, and the impact on states such as Western Australia remains difficult to fully value. The lack of population densi

McHugh J's judgment also extended a line of jurisprudence that had flowed from a series of cases in the 1980s and 1990s dealing with implied freedoms of political communication, that ‘the political and legal sovereignty of Australia now resides in the people of Australia’. A distinction between the 'political' conception of sovereignty, and the legal definition, was a concept first elucidated by James Bryce in the early 20th century. The concept of the political, or popular, version of sovereignty could be defined as ‘the notion that the ultimate source of all authority exercised through the public institutions of the state originates in the people." A consequence of this decision could be viewed as to what extent this judgment adopts the view that the sovereignty of the nation now resides in the Australian population and how that could impact on prior constitutional law. George Duke suggests that this judgment doesn't clear up entirely the position of the High Court and; "taken as a whole, the dicta of the High Court on popular sovereignty suggest a preference for a weak conception tied to elective parliamentary representation. The relevant High Court dicta on popular sovereignty are far from uniform". The basis of this argument is that the Australian Constitution has been popularly affirmed prior to enaction, and that following the termination of links with the United Kingdom via the Australia Acts the continuing effectiveness of the Constitution has been by the 'acquiescence of the people'. McGinty v Western Australia directly impacted this by adding definition to the words 'directly chosen by the people' and considering what impact the idea of representative democracy should have on subsequent constitutional interpretation. Gummow J's consideration of the role of the population was also particularly interesting, he noted that the extent of the population's control over the Commonwealth Constitution was limited only to an affirmative or negative vote on a proposition, the actual substance of alteration is decided by the parliament. Even the people's control over the governance of the nation is only limited to the election of representatives who are periodically up for re-election.
