= List of justices of the High Court of Australia =

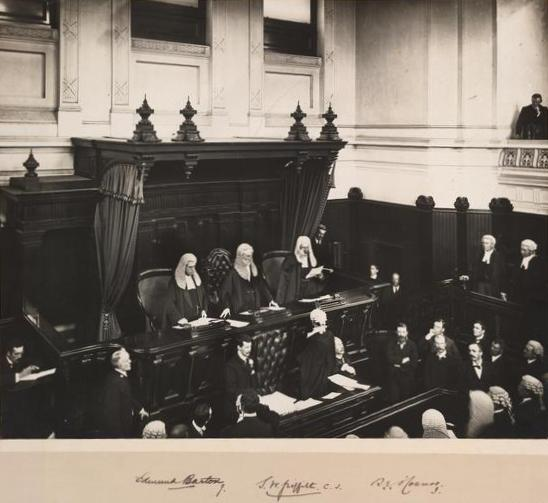
Official photograph of the first session of the High Court of Australia in the Banco Court, Supreme Court of Victoria, 6 October 1903. The mounting is autographed by the three foundation justices: from left to right, Edmund Barton, Samuel Griffith and Richard O'Connor.

The High Court of Australia is composed of seven justices: the chief justice of Australia and six other justices. There have been 57 justices who have served as justices of the High Court since its formation under the Judiciary Act 1903. Under Section 71 of the Australian Constitution, the judicial power of the Commonwealth of Australia is vested in the court, and it has been the highest court in the Australian court hierarchy since the passing of the Australia Act 1986.

In a May 2017 speech, Justice Virginia Bell observed that "few Australians outside the law schools are likely to be able to name the Chief Justice, let alone the puisne justices of the High Court".

== History ==
Initially, there were three justices of the High Court – Chief Justice Sir Samuel Griffith, Justice Sir Edmund Barton and Justice Richard Edward O'Connor. The number was expanded in 1906, at the request of the justices, to five, with the appointment of Justices Sir Isaac Isaacs and H. B. Higgins. After O'Connor's death in 1912, an amendment to the Judiciary Act 1903 expanded the bench to seven. For most of 1930, two seats were left vacant due to monetary constraints placed on the court by the Depression. The economic downturn had also led to a reduction in litigation and consequently less work for the court. After Isaacs retired in 1931, his seat was left empty, and in 1933 an amendment to the Judiciary Act officially reduced the number of seats to six. However, this led to some decisions being split three-all. With the appointment of William Webb in 1946, the number of seats returned to seven, and since then the court has had seven justices. As of 2021 there have been 55 justices, 13 of whom have been chief justice.

Appointments to the court were for life until 1977, when a mandatory retirement age of 70 was established, though several post-1977 justices have retired before reaching the age of 70 (William Deane resigned as a justice to be appointed governor-general).

== Composition of the High Court ==
There have been 57 justices of the High Court; fifty have been men and seven women. The first female justice was Mary Gaudron who served from 1987 to 2003. Susan Crennan was a justice from 2005 to 2015, and Virginia Bell from 2009 to 2021. Susan Kiefel was the first woman to be appointed Chief Justice of Australia. She was appointed in 2017 and had been a justice from 2007 to 2017. Of the seven current justices, four are men, including the chief justice, and three are women. Michelle Gordon was appointed in 2015 and Jacqueline Gleeson in 2021, replacing Bell. Jayne Jagot replaced Justice Keane on the court in 2022, giving women a majority on the High Court for a period of just over a year.

Thirteen politicians, serving or former, have been appointed to the High Court of Australia. Nine justices have served in the Parliament of Australia: Edmund Barton, Richard O'Connor, Isaac Isaacs, H. B. Higgins, Edward McTiernan, H. V. Evatt, John Latham, Garfield Barwick, and Lionel Murphy. All but Evatt were appointed after their parliamentary service; Evatt resigned from the bench in order to pursue his federal political career, although he had previously served in the New South Wales Legislative Assembly. In addition to the above, four justices served in colonial parliaments: Samuel Griffith, Charles Powers, Albert Piddington and Adrian Knox, although all concluded their political careers more than 10 years prior to their appointments. The most recent justice to serve in state or federal parliament is Lionel Murphy.

The majority of justices have come from the eastern states, particularly New South Wales (29 justices), Victoria (16 justices) and Queensland (8 justices). It was not until 1979 that a justice was appointed from Western Australia. There has never been a justice from South Australia. Robert Beech-Jones was born in Tasmania but went to university in Canberra and spent most of his career in Sydney.

Most justices had previously served as judges of other Australian courts prior to their appointment to the High Court. Prior to the creation of the Federal Court of Australia in 1976, this was primarily the Supreme Courts of the States. Since 1976, a number of justices of the Federal Court have been appointed to the High Court. A small number of justices served on both a State Supreme Court and the Federal Court before being appointed to the High Court.

== List of justices ==
The current judges are listed in bold on the table below.

| # | Image | Name | State | Birth – death | Position | Term began | Term ended | Time in office | PM at app't | Prev. experience | Notes |
|---|---|---|---|---|---|---|---|---|---|---|---|
| 1 | | Sir Samuel Griffith | Qld | 1845–1920 | Chief justice | 5 October 1903 | 17 October 1919 | 16 years, 12 days | Deakin | Chief justice, Sup Ct of Qld | |
| 2 | | Sir Edmund Barton | NSW | 1849–1920 | Justice | 5 October 1903 | 7 January 1920 | 16 years, 94 days | Deakin | None | Former prime minister Died in office |
| 3 | | Richard O'Connor | NSW | 1851–1912 | Justice | 5 October 1903 | 18 November 1912 | 9 years, 44 days | Deakin | None | Died in office |
| 4 | | Sir Isaac Isaacs | Vic | 1855–1948 | Justice | 12 October 1906 | 21 January 1931 | 24 years, 101 days (Note: Terms as puisne justice and chief justice combined) | Deakin | None | Resigned to be appointed governor-general |
| 4 | | Sir Isaac Isaacs | Vic | 1855–1948 | Chief justice | 2 April 1930 | 21 January 1931 | 294 days | Scullin | None | Resigned to be appointed governor-general |
| 5 | | H. B. Higgins | Vic | 1851–1929 | Justice | 13 October 1906 | 13 January 1929 | 22 years, 92 days | Deakin | None | Died in office |
| 6 | | Sir Frank Gavan Duffy | Vic | 1852–1936 | Justice | 11 February 1913 | 1 October 1935 | 22 years, 232 days | Fisher | None | |
| 6 | | Sir Frank Gavan Duffy | Vic | 1852–1936 | Chief justice | 22 January 1931 | 1 October 1935 | 4 years, 252 days | Scullin | None | |
| 7 | | Sir Charles Powers | Qld | 1853–1939 | Justice | 5 March 1913 | 22 July 1929 | 16 years, 139 days | Fisher | None | |
| 8* | | Albert Piddington | NSW | 1862–1945 | Justice | 6 March 1913 | 5 April 1913 | 30 days (Note: Albert Piddington resigned from the High Court before being sworn in. He never sat on the High Court bench.) | Fisher | None | Resigned before sitting |
| 9 | | Sir George Rich | NSW | 1863–1956 | Justice | 5 April 1913 | 5 May 1950 | 37 years, 30 days | Fisher | Sup Ct of NSW | |
| 10 | | Sir Adrian Knox | NSW | 1863–1932 | Chief justice | 18 October 1919 | 31 March 1930 | 10 years, 164 days | Hughes | None | |
| 11 | | Sir Hayden Starke | Vic | 1871–1958 | Justice | 5 February 1920 | 31 January 1950 | 29 years, 360 days | Hughes | None | |
| 12 | | Sir Owen Dixon | Vic | 1886–1972 | Justice | 4 February 1929 | 13 April 1964 | 35 years, 69 days | Bruce | None | |
| 12 | | Sir Owen Dixon | Vic | 1886–1972 | Chief justice | 18 April 1952 | 13 April 1964 | 11 years, 361 days | Menzies | None | |
| 13 | | H. V. Evatt | NSW | 1894–1965 | Justice | 19 December 1930 | 2 September 1940 | 9 years, 258 days | Scullin | None | Resigned to return to politics |
| 14 | | Sir Edward McTiernan | NSW | 1892–1990 | Justice | 20 December 1930 | 12 September 1976 | **45 years, 267 days** | Scullin | None | |
| 15 | | Sir John Latham | Vic | 1877–1964 | Chief justice | 11 October 1935 | 7 April 1952 | 16 years, 179 days | Lyons | None | |
| 16 | | Sir Dudley Williams | NSW | 1889–1963 | Justice | 15 October 1940 | 31 July 1958 | 17 years, 289 days | Menzies | Sup Ct of NSW | |
| 17 | | Sir William Webb | Qld | 1887–1972 | Justice | 16 May 1946 | 16 May 1958 | 12 years, 0 days | Chifley | Chief justice, Sup Ct of Qld | |
| 18 | | Sir Wilfred Fullagar | Vic | 1892–1961 | Justice | 8 February 1950 | 9 July 1961 | 11 years, 151 days | Menzies | Sup Ct of Vic | Died in office |
| 19 | | Sir Frank Kitto | NSW | 1903–1994 | Justice | 10 May 1950 | 1 August 1970 | 20 years, 83 days | Menzies | None | |
| 20 | | Sir Alan Taylor | NSW | 1901–1969 | Justice | 3 September 1952 | 3 August 1969 | 16 years, 334 days | Menzies | Sup Ct of NSW | Died in office |
| 21 | | Sir Douglas Menzies | Vic | 1907–1974 | Justice | 12 June 1958 | 29 November 1974 | 16 years, 170 days | Menzies | None | Died in office |
| 22 | | Sir Victor Windeyer | NSW | 1900–1987 | Justice | 8 September 1958 | 29 February 1972 | 13 years, 174 days | Menzies | None | |
| 23 | | Sir William Owen | NSW | 1899–1972 | Justice | 22 September 1961 | 31 March 1972 | 10 years, 191 days | Menzies | Sup Ct of NSW | Died in office |
| 24 | | Sir Garfield Barwick | NSW | 1903–1997 | Chief justice | 27 April 1964 | 11 February 1981 | 16 years, 290 days | Menzies | None | |
| 25 | | Sir Cyril Walsh | NSW | 1909–1973 | Justice | 20 September 1969 | 29 November 1973 | 4 years, 70 days | Gorton | Sup Ct of NSW; NSW Ct of App | Died in office |
| 26 | | Sir Harry Gibbs | Qld | 1917–2005 | Justice | 4 August 1970 | 5 February 1987 | 16 years, 185 days | Gorton | Fed Ct of BK; Sup Ct of Qld | |
| 26 | | Sir Harry Gibbs | Qld | 1917–2005 | Chief justice | 12 February 1981 | 5 February 1987 | 5 years, 358 days (Note: Justices to whom mandatory retirement (age 70) applied/applies; appointments since 1977) | Fraser | Fed Ct of BK; Sup Ct of Qld | |
| 27 | | Sir Ninian Stephen | Vic | 1923–2017 | Justice | 1 March 1972 | 11 May 1982 | 10 years, 71 days | McMahon | Sup Ct of Vic | Resigned to be appointed governor-general |
| 28 | | Sir Anthony Mason | NSW | 1925–2026 | Justice | 7 August 1972 | 20 April 1995 | 22 years, 256 days | McMahon | Sup Ct of NSW; NSW Ct of App | Previously Solicitor-General of Australia |
| 28 | | Sir Anthony Mason | NSW | 1925–2026 | Chief justice | 6 February 1987 | 20 April 1995 | 8 years, 73 days | Hawke | Sup Ct of NSW; NSW Ct of App | Previously Solicitor-General of Australia |
| 29 | | Sir Kenneth Jacobs | NSW | 1917–2015 | Justice | 8 February 1974 | 6 April 1979 | 5 years, 57 days | Whitlam | Sup Ct of NSW; NSW Ct of App | |
| 30 | | Lionel Murphy | NSW | 1922–1986 | Justice | 10 February 1975 | 21 October 1986 | 11 years, 253 days | Whitlam | None | Died in office |
| 31 | | Sir Keith Aickin | Vic | 1916–1982 | Justice | 20 September 1976 | 18 June 1982 | 5 years, 271 days | Fraser | None | Died in office |
| 32 | | Sir Ronald Wilson | WA | 1922–2005 | Justice | 21 May 1979 | 13 February 1989 | 9 years, 268 days | Fraser | None | |
| 33 | | Sir Gerard Brennan | Qld | 1928–2022 | Justice | 12 February 1981 | 21 May 1998 | 17 years, 98 days | Fraser | Fed Ct | |
| 33 | | Sir Gerard Brennan | Qld | 1928–2022 | Chief justice | 21 April 1995 | 21 May 1998 | 3 years, 30 days | Keating | Fed Ct | |
| 34 | | Sir William Deane | NSW | 1931– | Justice | 25 June 1982 | 11 November 1995 | 13 years, 139 days | Fraser | Fed Ct | Resigned to be appointed governor-general |
| 35 | | Sir Daryl Dawson | Vic | 1933– | Justice | 30 July 1982 | 15 August 1997 | 15 years, 16 days | Fraser | None | |
| 36 | | John Toohey | WA | 1930–2015 | Justice | 6 February 1987 | 2 February 1998 | 10 years, 361 days | Hawke | Fed Ct | |
| 37 | | Mary Gaudron | NSW | 1943–2026 | Justice | 6 February 1987 | 31 January 2003 | 15 years, 359 days | Hawke | None | |
| 38 | | Michael McHugh | NSW | 1935– | Justice | 14 February 1989 | 31 October 2005 | 16 years, 259 days | Hawke | Sup Ct of NSW; NSW Ct of App | |
| 39 | | William Gummow | NSW | 1942–2026 | Justice | 21 April 1995 | 8 October 2012 | 17 years, 170 days | Keating | Fed Ct | |
| 40 | | Michael Kirby | NSW | 1939– | Justice | 6 February 1996 | 2 February 2009 | 12 years, 362 days | Keating | Sup Ct of NSW; Pres, NSW Ct of App | |
| 41 | | Kenneth Hayne | Vic | 1945– | Justice | 22 September 1997 | 5 June 2015 | 17 years, 256 days | Howard | Sup Ct of Vic; Vic Ct of App | |
| 42 | | Ian Callinan | Qld | 1937– | Justice | 3 February 1998 | 31 August 2007 | 9 years, 209 days | Howard | None | |
| 43 | | Murray Gleeson | NSW | 1938– | Chief justice | 22 May 1998 | 29 August 2008 | 10 years, 99 days | Howard | Chief justice, Sup Ct of NSW | |
| 44 | | Dyson Heydon | NSW | 1943– | Justice | 1 February 2003 | 28 February 2013 | 10 years, 27 days | Howard | Sup Ct of NSW; NSW Ct of App | |
| 45 | | Susan Crennan | Vic | 1945– | Justice | 1 November 2005 | 2 February 2015 | 9 years, 93 days | Howard | Fed Ct | |
| 46 | | Susan Kiefel | Qld | 1954– | Justice | 4 September 2007 | 5 November 2023 | 16 years, 62 days | Howard | Sup Ct of Qld; Fed Ct | |
| 46 | | Susan Kiefel | Qld | 1954– | Chief justice | 30 January 2017 | 5 November 2023 | 6 years, 279 days | Turnbull | Sup Ct of Qld; Fed Ct | |
| 47 | | Robert French | WA | 1947– | Chief justice | 8 September 2008 | 29 January 2017 | 8 years, 143 days | Rudd | Fed Ct | |
| 48 | | Virginia Bell | NSW | 1951– | Justice | 3 February 2009 | 28 February 2021 | 12 years, 25 days | Rudd | Sup Ct of NSW; NSW Ct of App | |
| 49 | | **Stephen Gageler** | NSW | 1958– | Justice | 9 October 2012 | Incumbent | 14 years, 40 days | Gillard | None | Previously Solicitor-General of Australia |
| 49 | | **Stephen Gageler** | NSW | 1958– | Chief justice | 6 November 2023 | Incumbent | 3 years, 12 days | Albanese | None | Previously Solicitor-General of Australia |
| 50 | | Patrick Keane | Qld | 1952– | Justice | 1 March 2013 | 17 October 2022 | 9 years, 230 days | Gillard | Sup Ct of Qld; Fed Ct | |
| 51 | | Geoffrey Nettle | Vic | 1950– | Justice | 3 February 2015 | 30 November 2020 | 5 years, 301 days | Abbott | Sup Ct of Vic | |
| 52 | Justice Gordon at Singapore Management University in 2024 | **Michelle Gordon** | Vic | 1964– | Justice | 9 June 2015 | Incumbent | 11 years, 162 days | Abbott | Fed Ct | |
| 53 | | **James Edelman** | WA | 1974– | Justice | 30 January 2017 | Incumbent | 9 years, 292 days | Turnbull | Fed Ct; Sup Ct of WA | |
| 54 | | **Simon Steward** | Vic | 1969– | Justice | 1 December 2020 | Incumbent | 5 years, 352 days | Morrison | Fed Ct | |
| 55 | | **Jacqueline Gleeson** | NSW | 1966– | Justice | 1 March 2021 | Incumbent | 5 years, 262 days | Morrison | Fed Ct | |
| 56 | | **Jayne Jagot** | NSW | 1964/65– | Justice | 17 October 2022 | Incumbent | 4 years, 32 days | Albanese | Fed Ct; NSW LEC | |
| 57 | | **Robert Beech-Jones** | NSW | c.1964 | Justice | 6 November 2023 | Incumbent | 3 years, 12 days | Albanese | Sup Ct of NSW | |

== Current justices ==
| Name | State | Date appointed | Mandatory retirement | Appointing Governor-General | Nominating Prime Minister | Previous posting(s) | Education |
|---|---|---|---|---|---|---|---|
| Stephen Gageler (Chief Justice) | NSW | 6 November 2023 (as Chief Justice); 9 October 2012 (as Justice) | 4 July 2028 | David Hurley (as Chief Justice); Quentin Bryce (as Justice) | Anthony Albanese (Labor, as Chief Justice); Julia Gillard (Labor, as Justice) | Solicitor-General of Australia | Australian National University; Harvard University |
| Michelle Gordon | Vic | 9 June 2015 | 18 November 2034 | Peter Cosgrove | Tony Abbott (Liberal) | Federal Court of Australia | University of Western Australia |
| James Edelman | WA | 30 January 2017 | 8 January 2044 | Peter Cosgrove | Malcolm Turnbull (Liberal) | Supreme Court of Western Australia; Federal Court of Australia | University of Western Australia; Murdoch University; University of Oxford |
| Simon Steward | Vic | 1 December 2020 | 9 January 2039 | David Hurley | Scott Morrison (Liberal) | Federal Court of Australia | University of Melbourne |
| Jacqueline Gleeson | NSW | 1 March 2021 | 6 March 2036 | David Hurley | Scott Morrison (Liberal) | Federal Court of Australia | University of Sydney |
| Jayne Jagot | NSW | 17 October 2022 | 18 June 2035 | David Hurley | Anthony Albanese (Labor) | Federal Court of Australia; Land and Environment Court of New South Wales | Macquarie University; University of Sydney |
| Robert Beech-Jones | NSW | 6 November 2023 | 2035 | David Hurley | Anthony Albanese (Labor) | Supreme Court of New South Wales | Australian National University |

== Seats of the High Court ==
This following chart illustrates the composition of the High Court. It indicates the seven seats of the court, and who has occupied each seat at different points in the court's existence. The red portions represent the future part of a judge's term and show the date at which they are bound to retire from the court (although they may choose to retire before that date). The blue portions of a judge's term show a period in which that judge was chief justice.

== See also ==
- High Court of Australia
- List of chief justices of Australia by time in office
- List of jurists
- List of law schools attended by Australian High Court justices
