= Rainbow Giving Australia =

Australian LGBT charitable organisation

Rainbow Giving Australia is a foundation supporting the LGBTQIA+ community. It was formed in 2024, following the merger of The Aurora Group and GiveOUT.

== History ==
Since being founded in 1999, Aurora has organised events connected with quality food, wine and entertainment. Its signature event is the Aurora Annual Dinner, held since 2000, a large formal gala dinner held in late June each year to commemorate International Stonewall Day.

The keynote address delivered at the Aurora Annual Dinner each year is a significant statement on current issues of importance to the Australian gay and lesbian community. The 2006 keynote address was delivered by New South Wales Supreme Court Justice Virginia Bell. The 2007 keynote address was delivered by New Zealander Georgina Beyer, the world's first transsexual Mayor and Member of Parliament.

The Aurora Group raises funds through two main categories of activities - a giving program and its events program. Aurora exists so people can donate to a broad range of causes that benefit the lesbian, gay and transgender communities. Aurora's two major beneficiaries are Twenty Ten GLBT Youth Support and the Gay and Lesbian Counselling Service of NSW in addition to a broad range of other community organisations and projects.

Aurora was founded by a group of friends who shared a common history of extensive involvement in many community organisations. Aurora was included in the name because it contains all the colours of the rainbow, which symbolises freedom. But in an aurora, the colours are presented in a living display of dazzling movement and glitter. Ruby was included to provide context for the glittering colours of the aurora because of its symbolic links with the gay community through the ruby slippers worn by Dorothy as she travelled the Yellow Brick Road.
