= Dudley Williams (judge) =

Australian judge (1889–1963)

The Honourable Sir Dudley Williams KBE MC QC
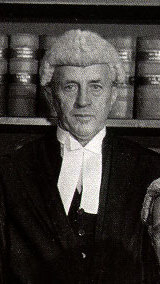
- Justice Williams, cropped from a 1952 image of the full bench of the High Court

Justice of the High Court of Australia
- In office 15 October 1940 – 31 July 1958
- Nominated by: Robert Menzies
- Preceded by: H.V. Evatt
- Succeeded by: Sir Victor Windeyer

Personal details
- Born: 7 December 1889 Sydney, Colony of New South Wales
- Died: 8 January 1963 (aged 73)

Sir Dudley Williams (7 December 1889 – 8 January 1963), Australian judge, was a Justice of the High Court of Australia.

Williams was born in Sydney, and was educated at Sydney Church of England Grammar School (Shore). He later studied at the University of Sydney, where he graduated with a Bachelor of Arts in 1912 and a Bachelor of Laws (with honours) in 1915.

He was admitted to the New South Wales Bar later in 1915, but did not practise until 1921, because of his service in the First World War. He was a captain in the Royal Field Artillery, and was awarded the Military Cross. In 1935 Williams was made a King's Counsel. In 1939 he was appointed as an Acting Judge of the Supreme Court of New South Wales and in 1940 he was elevated to the position of a full Judge of the court. In the same year, Williams was appointed to the bench of the High Court, on 15 October. He remained on the bench until his retirement in 1958.

Sir Dudley Williams died in 1963.
