= Jacqueline Gleeson =

Australian High Court justice (born 1966)

The Honourable Justice Jacqueline Gleeson

Justice of the High Court of Australia
- Incumbent
- Assumed office 1 March 2021
- Nominated by: Scott Morrison
- Appointed by: David Hurley
- Preceded by: Virginia Bell

Judge of the Federal Court of Australia
- In office 15 April 2014 – 28 February 2021

Personal details
- Born: 7 March 1966 (age 60)
- Parents: Murray Gleeson (father); Robyn Gleeson (mother)
- Relatives: Eric Bana (brother-in-law)
- Education: Monte Sant'Angelo Mercy College; University of Sydney
- Occupation: Jurist

Jacqueline Sarah Gleeson (born 7 March 1966) is an Australian jurist. She has been a Justice of the High Court of Australia since 1 March 2021, and was a judge of the Federal Court of Australia, based in Sydney, from April 2014 to February 2021.

== Early life and education ==
Gleeson is the eldest of four children of former Chief Justice of Australia Murray Gleeson and Robyn Gleeson. Speaking about her upbringing, Gleeson stated that "my wellbeing and development was my mother's job and she can justly take credit for any success of mine." She was educated at Monte Sant'Angelo Mercy College and attended Sancta Sophia College, University of Sydney, where she completed a Bachelor of Arts in 1986 and a Bachelor of Laws in 1989.

== Career ==
Gleeson was admitted as a lawyer in 1989, and worked as an associate to Justice Trevor Morling of the Federal Court and then as a solicitor for Bush Burke & Company. Gleeson was admitted as a barrister in 1991. In 2000, she left the Bar to work as general counsel for the Australian Broadcasting Authority and then from 2003 a senior executive lawyer for the Australian Government Solicitor. She completed a Master of Laws from the University of Sydney in 2005, before returning to the Bar in 2007. She gained senior counsel status in 2012. Her practice specialised in administrative law, competition and consumer law, professional liability, disciplinary proceedings and taxation. Gleeson represented the New South Wales government at the Royal Commission into Institutional Responses to Child Sexual Abuse, and represented QBE Insurance in the Canberra bushfires litigation in 2013, then the Australian Capital Territory's largest ever civil case.

=== Federal Court ===
Gleeson was appointed to the Federal Court by Attorney-General George Brandis on 15 April 2014, replacing retired Justice Dennis Cowdroy. Gleeson has sat on a number of high-profile cases, dismissing claims against the Australian Securities and Investments Commission brought by clients of Storm Financial that alleged that the regulator should have taken action to prevent their loss. Gleeson held that a company promoting a scheme "how to buy a house for $1" had engaged in misleading and deceptive conduct. Gleeson was a member of the Full Court of the Federal Court that unanimously upheld an appeal by the Australian Defence Force, finding that the ADF had not breached the implied freedom of political communication when it terminated Gaynor's commission in the army reserve after he expressed anti-homosexual and anti-Islamic views. The High Court refused special leave to appeal against the decision. In June 2019, Gleeson found in favour of Kimberly-Clark Australia in Australian Competition and Consumer Commission's (ACCC) case against them for the claim that "flushable wipes" were in fact safely flushable in Australia's sewerage system, saying that although they contributed to household sewerage system blockages in an unknown number of instances, even faecal matter and toilet paper contributed to those problems. ACCC argued unsuccessfully that Kimberly-Clark shouldn't be able to take advantage of the difficulty to isolate individual causes in individual cases, and that it was a significant cause of systematic issues.

=== High Court ===
On 28 October 2020, Prime Minister Scott Morrison and Attorney-General Christian Porter announced that Gleeson and Simon Steward would be appointed to the High Court of Australia to fill the vacancies caused by upcoming retirements of Geoffrey Nettle and Virginia Bell. She began her term on 1 March 2021 in succession to Bell.

== See also ==
- List of Judges of the Federal Court of Australia
