= Robert Beech-Jones =

Australian judge

The Honourable Justice Robert Beech-Jones

Justice of the High Court of Australia
- Incumbent
- Assumed office 6 November 2023
- Nominated by: Anthony Albanese
- Appointed by: David Hurley
- Preceded by: Stephen Gageler

Personal details
- Born: Wynyard, Tasmania, Australia
- Spouse: Suzie Miller
- Education: Australian National University
- Occupation: Barrister

Robert Beech-Jones is an Australian judge. He was appointed to the High Court of Australia in 2023, and previously served as a judge of the Supreme Court of New South Wales from 2012 to 2023.

== Early life and education ==
Robert Beech-Jones was born in Wynyard, Tasmania. He is the youngest of four children born to Joan and Mike Beech-Jones, who emigrated to Australia from Wales in 1963. His father adopted a double-barrelled surname to honour Beech-Jones' paternal grandmother, who died from ovarian cancer when his father was a child.

Beech-Jones grew up in Savage River, a small mining town on the west coast of Tasmania, where his father held a management position. He had to complete his secondary education elsewhere as the local high school ended after year 10. His family also lived in Montreal, Canada, from 1975 to 1977.

Beech-Jones graduated from the Australian National University in 1988 with the degrees of Bachelor of Science and Bachelor of Laws. Whilst at the Australian National University, Beech-Jones resided at Burgmann College.

== Legal career ==
Beech-Jones began practising law in Sydney in the 1980s. He was called to the New South Wales Bar in 1992, joined 11th Floor St James Hall, and was appointed Senior Counsel in 2006. He practised primarily in the areas of commercial law, regulatory enforcement, white collar crime, and administrative law.

Beech-Jones was appointed to the New South Wales Supreme Court in 2012 and in August 2021 was appointed the Chief Judge at Common Law and a judge of the New South Wales Court of Appeal.

On 22 August 2023, his appointment to the High Court of Australia was announced, to take effect on 6 November 2023. He is the first High Court justice born in Tasmania.

== Personal life ==
Beech-Jones is married to Australian playwright Suzie Miller, with whom he has two children.

Legal offices
Preceded by Stephen Gageler	Justice of the High Court of Australia; 2023–present	Incumbent
