= William Gummow =

Justice of the High Court of Australia (1942–2026)

The Honourable William Gummow AC

Justice of the High Court of Australia
- In office 21 April 1995 – 8 October 2012
- Nominated by: Paul Keating
- Appointed by: Bill Hayden
- Preceded by: Sir Gerard Brennan
- Succeeded by: Stephen Gageler

Non-Permanent Judge of the Court of Final Appeal of Hong Kong
- In office 29 July 2013 – 17 September 2026
- Appointed by: Leung Chun-ying

Personal details
- Born: William Montague Charles Gummow; 9 October 1942 Sydney, New South Wales, Australia
- Died: 17 September 2026 (aged 83)
- Occupation: Judge, barrister, solicitor

Chinese name
- Chinese: 甘慕賢
Transcriptions
Yue: Cantonese
- Yale Romanization: Gām Mouh Yìhn
- Jyutping: Gam^{1} Mou^{6} Jin^{4}

William Montague Charles Gummow AC (9 October 1942 – 17 September 2026) was an Australian judge who was a Justice of the High Court of Australia, the highest court in the Australian court hierarchy. He was appointed to the Court of Final Appeal of Hong Kong on 8 April 2013 as a non-permanent judge from other common law jurisdictions.

== Early life and education ==
Gummow was born in Sydney, pre-deceased by his father, who was killed on active service in the Royal Australian Navy during World War II. Gummow completed his secondary education at Sydney Grammar School. He went on to study at the University of Sydney, where he graduated as Bachelor of Arts, and later Master of Laws, both with first-class honours. One of his lecturers was Sir Anthony Mason.

== Career ==
=== Early legal career ===
Gummow first practiced as a solicitor with law firm Allen Allen and Hemsley. He was admitted as a solicitor in 1966 and became a partner of the firm in 1969. He had a diverse practice, including banking law, trusts and revenue law, intellectual property litigation, commercial transactions and some constitutional law.

=== Barristerial career ===
After 10 years in practice as a solicitor, Gummow was called to the New South Wales Bar in 1976. At the bar, his practice included equity, commercial, tax and intellectual property matters. It also included large constitutional issues and in several cases he appeared as a junior to then Commonwealth Solicitor-General, Maurice Byers. Gummow was appointed a Queen's Counsel in 1986.

=== Judicial career ===
In 1986, Justice Gummow was appointed to the Federal Court of Australia. He was appointed to the High Court of Australia in April 1995. He retired from the High Court on 8 October 2012, upon reaching the constitutionally mandatory retirement age of 70.

On 8 April 2013, he was appointed to the Court of Final Appeal of Hong Kong as a non-permanent judge from other common law jurisdictions. He remained in the position as of July 2025, along with other Australian judges Patrick Keane and James Allsop, after British judge Jonathan Sumption resigned, criticising the judiciary of Hong Kong after 14 prominent democratic activists were convicted of subversion.

=== Academic career ===
For 30 years, from the year of his graduation until his appointment as a judge, Gummow taught at the Faculty of Law at the University of Sydney. He lectured in equity from 1970 to 1995. Gummow's essay Legal Education (1988) emphasised the importance of statutes and legal history; areas he considered were and are insufficiently taught in Australian law schools. He further advocated the need for practitioners in legal education, who were exposed to 'the law in action'.

Following his retirement from the High Court of Australia, Gummow was appointed a Professor of the Sydney Law School, where he gave guest lectures, and a professor at the Australian National University (ANU) College of Law, where he taught in the constitutional, equity, conflict of laws and refugee law programs.

== Jurisprudence ==
Gummow's judgments are notable for their careful attention to statutory language and context, and are marked by a thorough and scholarly examination of doctrinal history. Gummow is particularly known for his contribution to intellectual property law and equity.

Any attempt to select notable judgments of Justice Gummow is made difficult because he is so often a participant in joint judgments, whose authorship cannot be attributed. However, some of his more notable individual opinions include: Breen v Williams, Kable v Director of Public Prosecutions for New South Wales, The Wik Peoples v The State of Queensland, Hill trading as R F Hill & Associates v Van Erp, Pyrenees Shire Council v Day, Scott v Davis, Roxborough v Rothmans of Pall Mall, and Al-Kateb v Godwin.

Gummow was also the author of, or participant in, numerous leading judgments in intellectual property law. See, for example: Werner & Co v Bailey Aluminium Products (1989), Advanced Building Systems v Ramset Fasteners (1998), Prestige Group v Dart Industries (1990), ConAgra v McCain Foods (1992).

Statistics in recent years have consistently shown Justice Gummow to be most likely to participate or be joined in a majority opinion. He only dissented once in 2006, out of 55 judgments. Justice Gummow also often joined with Justice Hayne; in 2006 this number was 40 (75.47%) joint judgments. Similarly, in the same year Justices Gummow and Hayne joined each other in judgment in all 11 constitutional cases. Michael McHugh, who served on the court with Gummow for ten years, has called Gummow as a "great judicial politician", referring to his ability to convince other justices of the court to join in his opinions.

== Publications ==
Gummow wrote extensively and published numerous essays and articles.

He was the author of books including Change and Continuity: Statute, Equity, and Federalism, which is based upon the lectures he delivered at Oxford University in 1999 as part of the Clarendon law lectures series. These lectures take up themes of continuity and change in the law, particularly as they appear in the great common law jurisdictions.

Gummow was a co-author of Jacobs' Law of Trusts in Australia, and Equity: Doctrines and Remedies, the pre-eminent text on equity in Australia. Gummow also wrote, with Dyson Heydon and Robert Austin, several editions of Cases and Materials on Equity and Trusts (4th ed, 1993).

== Personal life and death ==
Gummow was unmarried and protective of his personal life.

In 2018, Gummow suffered a blood clot in a leg following a long-haul flight and had to have part of his leg amputated in Sydney.

Gummow died on 17 September 2026, at the age of 83.

== Honours ==
Gummow was appointed a Companion of the Order of Australia (AC), Australia's highest civil honour, in 1997, and awarded the Centenary Medal in 2001.

The University of Sydney honoured Gummow's scholarly contributions to the law by conferring him with an honorary doctorate in law (LLD).

Legal offices
Preceded by None	Non-Permanent Judge of the Court of Final Appeal of Hong Kong; 2013–2026	Succeeded by None
