= Geoffrey Nettle =

Australian judge

The Honourable Geoffrey Nettle AC

Justice of the High Court of Australia
- In office 3 February 2015 – 30 November 2020
- Nominated by: Tony Abbott
- Appointed by: Sir Peter Cosgrove
- Preceded by: Susan Crennan
- Succeeded by: Simon Steward

Personal details
- Born: 2 December 1950 (age 75) Cottesloe, Western Australia
- Education: Australian National University; University of Melbourne; University of Oxford

Geoffrey Arthur Akeroyd Nettle (born 2 December 1950) is a former Justice of the High Court of Australia, the highest court in the Australian court hierarchy, who served from 3 February 2015 to 30 November 2020. Prior to his appointment to the High Court, he served as a judge at the Court of Appeal, Supreme Court of Victoria, where he presided from June 2004 to 2015.

== Early life and education ==
Geoffrey Nettle was born in Cottesloe, Western Australia, a beachside suburb of Perth and moved to Victoria at an early age. Nettle received his secondary education at Wesley College, Melbourne.

Nettle completed a Bachelor of Economics at the Australian National University followed by a Bachelor of Laws, for which he received First Class Honours, at the University of Melbourne in 1975. While studying at Melbourne, he was a resident at Trinity College, where he rowed and played rugby. Nettle then completed a Bachelor of Civil Laws with First-Class Honours at Magdalen College, Oxford.

== Career ==
Nettle was admitted to practice in 1977 and was a solicitor with Mallesons Stephen Jaques (now Mallesons). He was called to the bar in November 1982. He became a Queen's Counsel in 1992. His major areas of practice were commercial law, taxation, constitutional law and administrative law. In 2001, Nettle was the crown prosecutor in the extradition case of Konrāds Kalējs, an alleged Nazi collaborationist.

Nettle was appointed a Judge of the Supreme Court of Victoria, Trial Division, in 2002, and a Judge of Appeal of the Victorian Court of Appeal, Supreme Court of Victoria, in 2004.

Unusually for an Appeal Justice, in 2013, he presided over the trial at first instance of Adrian Ernest Bayley for the rape and murder of Jill Meagher in Melbourne, Australia.

=== High Court ===
On 4 December 2014, the Commonwealth Attorney-General, Senator George Brandis, announced that Nettle would become a justice of the High Court of Australia, replacing Justice Susan Crennan. He took office on 3 February 2015, at the age of 64, making him the oldest person ever appointed to the High Court. He served a maximum of only five years and ten months on the court. and retired on 30 November 2020, the day before his 70th birthday.

== Awards and honours ==
On Australia Day 2019, Nettle was appointed a Companion of the Order of Australia "for eminent service to the judiciary, and to the law, to criminal and civil appeals reform, to legal education, and to professional standards".
