= Susan Crennan =

Former Justice of the High Court of Australia

The Honourable Susan Crennan AC KC
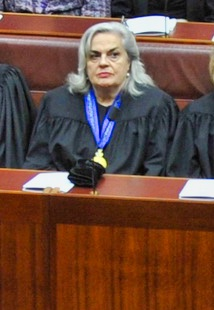

Justice of the High Court of Australia
- In office 1 November 2005 – 2 February 2015
- Nominated by: John Howard
- Appointed by: Michael Jeffery
- Preceded by: Michael McHugh
- Succeeded by: Geoffrey Nettle

Personal details
- Born: Susan Maree Walsh; 1945 (age 80–81) Melbourne, Victoria, Australia
- Spouse: Michael Crennan
- Children: 3
- Education: University of Melbourne; Sydney Law School

Susan Maree Crennan (née Walsh; born 1945) is a former Justice of the High Court of Australia, the highest court in the Australian court hierarchy.

== Early life and education ==
Susan Maree Crennan was born in 1945 in Melbourne, one of six children born to World War 2 veteran, John Maurice Walsh, and Marie Therese (née Henley), Catholics of Irish descent. She attended Our Lady of Mercy College, Heidelberg and the University of Melbourne, where she received a Bachelor of Arts. She later received a Bachelor of Laws from the University of Sydney. Crennan also completed a Postgraduate Diploma (History) at the University of Melbourne on the constitutional history of the state of Victoria.

== Career ==
Crennan was a teacher of English literature and was employed by various patent attorneys in New South Wales and Victoria between 1967–1978. She was admitted as a barrister in New South Wales in 1979 and Victoria in 1980. She was made Queen's Counsel in Victoria in 1989 and in New South Wales in 1990. From 1992–1997, Crennan served as a commissioner of the Human Rights and Equal Opportunity Commission (now the Australian Human Rights Commission), the peak human rights body in Australia.

In 1993, Crennan was the first woman to be appointed chair of the Victorian Bar Council, and the following year the first female president of the Australian Bar Association. Between 2003–2005, she was a member of the Council of the University of Melbourne.

Crennan was appointed to the Federal Court in 2003 and took her seat on the bench on 3 February 2004. In September 2005 it was announced that she would succeed Justice Michael McHugh in the High Court. Attorney-General of Australia Philip Ruddock, on announcing Crennan's appointment, said that Crennan "demonstrated, through the quality of her jurisprudence and her leadership, that she has the confidence of the legal profession and the broader Australian community".

She was sworn into the High Court by Chief Justice Murray Gleeson on 8 November 2005. The appointment made her the second female Justice to sit on the bench of the High Court of Australia, the first being Justice Mary Gaudron.

=== Retirement ===
After earlier plans to retire on her 70th birthday, in November 2014 it was announced that she would retire on 3 February 2015, five months before her 70th birthday.

This was explained as being in order that her retirement would not coincide with the retirement of Justice Kenneth Hayne, also planned for around that time. That would have left the court with only five justices for a period, making it difficult to consider constitutional cases.

Her final cases included consideration of the legality of the detention of 157 Sri Lankan Tamil asylum seekers at sea in July 2014, under Operation Sovereign Borders.

She was replaced by Victorian Court of Appeal judge Geoffrey Nettle.

== Honours ==
In January 2008 Crennan was awarded the highest Australian civilian honour, Companion of the Order of Australia (AC), for outstanding service to the law and the judiciary, particularly through leadership and mentoring roles with legal and professional associations, as a contributor to reform, and to the community.

In 2013, Crennan was also inducted into the Victorian Honour Roll of Women.

== Personal life and other activities ==
Susan Crennan and her husband, Michael Crennan QC, a barrister, have three children.

Crennan launched the Peter Steele Poetry Award, a scholarship available to PhD students in the Faculty of Arts at the University of Melbourne, in November 2017. She and her husband Michael are two of the donors to the trust that funds the scholarship.
