= Murray Gleeson =

Australian former Chief Justice

The Honourable Murray Gleeson AC GBS KC
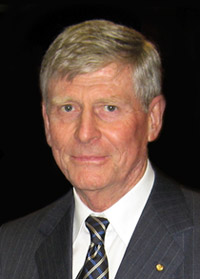
- Gleeson in 2006

Chief Justice of Australia
- In office 22 May 1998 – 29 August 2008
- Nominated by: John Howard
- Appointed by: Sir William Deane
- Preceded by: Sir Gerard Brennan
- Succeeded by: Robert French

Chief Justice of New South Wales
- In office 2 November 1988 – 21 May 1998
- Nominated by: Nick Greiner
- Appointed by: Sir James Rowland
- Preceded by: Sir Laurence Street
- Succeeded by: James Spigelman

Non-Permanent Judge of the Court of Final Appeal of Hong Kong
- In office 1 March 2009 – 29 February 2024
- Appointed by: Donald Tsang

Personal details
- Born: 30 August 1938 (age 88) Wingham, New South Wales, Australia
- Spouse: Robyn Paterson (m. 1965)
- Children: 4, including Jacqueline
- Relatives: Eric Bana (son-in-law)
- Education: University of Sydney

Chinese name
- Chinese: 紀立信
Transcriptions
Yue: Cantonese
- Yale Romanization: Géi Laahp Seun
- Jyutping: Gei^{2} Lai^{5} Seon^{3}

Anthony Murray Gleeson (born 30 August 1938) is an Australian former judge who served as the 11th Chief Justice of Australia, in office from 1998 to 2008.

Gleeson was born in Wingham, New South Wales, and studied law at the University of Sydney. He was admitted to the New South Wales Bar in 1963 and appointed Queen's Counsel in 1974, becoming one of the state's leading barristers. Gleeson was appointed Chief Justice of New South Wales in 1988, serving until his elevation to the High Court in 1998. He and Samuel Griffith (appointed 1903) are the only people to have been elevated directly from the chief justiceship of a state to the chief justiceship of the High Court. As required by the constitution, he retired from the court when he reached his 70th birthday.

In October 2020, Prime Minister Scott Morrison announced that Gleeson's daughter, Jacqueline Gleeson, will be elevated to the High Court following the retirement of Justice Virginia Bell.

== Early life ==
Gleeson was born in Wingham, New South Wales, the eldest of four children. He was educated at St. Joseph's College, Hunters Hill, where he won the Lawrence Campbell Oratory Competition in both 1953 and 1955, before matriculating to receive first class honours degrees in Arts and Law from the University of Sydney. Among his graduating class of 1962 were John Howard, later to become Prime Minister; and Michael Kirby, who later served alongside him as a judge on the High Court.

== Legal career ==
After graduation, Gleeson spent one year as a solicitor at Messrs Murphy & Moloney. Gleeson was admitted to the New South Wales Bar in 1963, where he read with Laurence Street and Anthony Mason - his future predecessors as Chief Justice of New South Wales and Chief Justice of Australia respectively.

His appearances as junior counsel focussed mainly on matters of taxation and commercial law, as well as important constitutional cases including Strickland v Rocla Concrete Pipes Ltd, which concerned the scope of the corporations power.

Upon his appointment as Queen's Counsel (QC) in 1974, Gleeson's career as senior counsel continued to focus on commercial and constitutional matters. However he also appeared in some high-profile criminal cases, including his successful defence before a jury of National Party MP Ian Sinclair in 1980. In the same year he appeared for the appellants in Port Jackson Stevedoring v Salmond & Spraggon, the last case granted leave to appeal to the Privy Council from the High Court. In 1981 he appeared for former Prime Minister Sir William McMahon in Evans v Crichton-Browne, excluding the rhetoric of electoral advertising from judicial scrutiny under the Commonwealth Electoral Act 1918. Gleeson was President of the New South Wales Bar Association 1984–1985.

Gleeson was a methodical counsel, who prepared his cases and even his cross examinations in minute detail. Retired Justice of Appeal Roddy Meagher said jokingly of Gleeson: "He has written nothing outside his professional work. He takes no interest in either music or art. He does, however, like flowers. He stares at them to make them wilt."

== Judicial career ==
=== Chief Justice of New South Wales ===
Gleeson was appointed Chief Justice of New South Wales in 1988, the first barrister to be directly elevated to the Chief Justiceship since Frederick Jordan in 1934. According to convention, he was also made Lieutenant Governor of New South Wales in 1989. During Gleeson's decade as Chief Justice of New South Wales, the court system dealt with considerable change including fast growing demand, cost constraints and delays. He sought to delineate appropriate boundaries for the political debate surrounding litigation, and was adamant that the proper administration of justice was a part of civilised government and not a free market privilege.

The tradition of the Chief Justice frequently appearing in the Court of Criminal Appeal was continued under Gleeson's tenure. In this role, he appeared as a judge in R v Birks, where it was found a trial counsel's proved incompetence was a ground of appeal, and Attorney-General (NSW) v Milat, where an indigent accused was found to be entitled to legal representation as a basic requirement of fairness in a serious legal trial.

Gleeson also frequently presided in the Court of Appeal, a forum more suited to his expertise in administrative, commercial, and constitutional law. In 1992, he presided over Greiner v Independent Commission Against Corruption, which exonerated Nick Greiner from charges of corruption, although Greiner was forced to resign as Premier months earlier by independents who controlled the balance of power in the New South Wales Legislative Assembly. Other notable cases include Ballina Shire Council v Ringland, where he endorsed the constitutionally implied right to freedom of political communication and concluded that councillors could not sue for defamation on statements about their performance, and Egan v Willis where the New South Wales Legislative Council was found to be empowered to compel the treasurer Michael Egan (then a member of the Legislative Council) to produce documents and to suspend him for non-compliance. In Egan v Chadwick, this power was found to be not limited by legal professional privilege.

=== Chief Justice of Australia ===
In May 1998, Gleeson was appointed Chief Justice of the High Court of Australia, replacing Sir Gerard Brennan. He was the first Chief Justice of a state supreme court to be appointed Chief Justice of the High Court since Samuel Griffith, whose own state Chief Justiceship preceded the formation of the High Court. He is also the first Chief Justice not to have been made a knight (however, Australia had ceased the practice of awarding knighthoods some years previously). During his tenure as Chief Justice, Gleeson actively maintained the importance of judicial independence in the face of increasing executive government power and public anger with court decisions. He also spoke out against the use of torture, forced confessions and detention without trial.

His tenure as Chief Justice was also characterised by a large number of joint judgments, and a relatively frequent number of judgments that clearly and plainly provide the Court's ratio decidendi. In 2020, at least six former associates of Dyson Heydon, another member of the bench led by Murray Gleeson, accused Heydon of sexual harassment, and one alleged that another judge, Michael McHugh had told Murray Gleeson about one of alleged acts.

On 30 July 2008, it was announced that Federal Court justice Robert French would succeed Gleeson as Chief Justice. In accordance with the Australian Constitution, he retired from the High Court on 29 August 2008, the day before his 70th birthday. The occasion was marked by a ceremonial sitting of the High Court in Canberra.

=== Court of Final Appeal of Hong Kong ===
On 7 November 2008, Gleeson was appointed a non-permanent judge of the Court of Final Appeal of the Hong Kong Special Administrative Region and served until 29 February 2024. He was given a Chinese name, "紀立信" (Jyutping: gei2lap6seon3) by the Hong Kong Judiciary.

== Honours ==
- He was appointed an Officer of the Order of Australia (AO) in 1986.
- He received Australia's highest civil honour when he was made a Companion of the Order of Australia (AC) in 1992.
- He was awarded the Centenary Medal in 2001.
- Life Fellow of the Australian Academy of Law.
- Grand Bauhinia Medal of Hong Kong in 2020.

== Personal life ==
He married Robyn Paterson in 1965, and the couple have four children. Their eldest daughter, Jacqueline, was appointed a judge of the Federal Court of Australia in 2014, after practising law as a barrister at the Sydney Bar and as general counsel of the Australian Broadcasting Authority. In October 2020, she was appointed to the High Court of Australia by Prime Minister Scott Morrison. Another daughter, Rebecca, is married to actor Eric Bana.

In September 2006, The Australian Financial Review magazine named Gleeson Australia's seventh most overtly powerful person.

Legal offices
Preceded by Sir Laurence Street	Chief Justice of New South Wales; 1988–1998	Succeeded by James Spigelman
Preceded by Sir Gerard Brennan	Chief Justice of Australia; 1998–2008	Succeeded by Robert French
Government offices
Preceded by Sir Laurence Street	Lieutenant-Governor of New South Wales; 1989–1998	Succeeded by James Spigelman
