= James Edelman =

Australian High Court justice since 2017 (born 1974)

The Honourable Justice James Edelman AC

Justice of the High Court of Australia
- Incumbent
- Assumed office 30 January 2017
- Nominated by: Malcolm Turnbull
- Appointed by: Peter Cosgrove
- Preceded by: Susan Kiefel

Justice of the Federal Court of Australia
- In office 20 April 2015 – 29 January 2017
- Appointed by: Peter Cosgrove
- Preceded by: Peter Jacobson

Justice of the Supreme Court of Western Australia
- In office 22 July 2011 – 19 April 2015
- Appointed by: Christian Porter
- Preceded by: Peter Blaxell
- Succeeded by: Peter Martino

Personal details
- Born: James Joshua Edelman; 9 January 1974 (age 52) Perth, Western Australia
- Education: University of Western Australia; Murdoch University; Magdalen College, Oxford

James Joshua Edelman AC (born 9 January 1974) has been a justice of the High Court of Australia since 30 January 2017, and is a former justice of the Federal Court of Australia and the Supreme Court of Western Australia. He is noted for his various achievements at a young age, including becoming a professor at Oxford University before the age of 35 and a justice of the Supreme Court of Western Australia before the age of 40. He was 43 years old upon commencing his appointment on the High Court and is eligible to continue until reaching the constitutionally required retirement age of 70 in 2044.

== Early Life ==
Edelman is Jewish.

== Education ==
Edelman completed high school at Scotch College in Perth, Western Australia. He completed bachelor's degrees in economics (1995) and Law (first class honours, 1996) at the University of Western Australia and a Bachelor of Commerce (1997) at Murdoch University.

He was awarded a Rhodes Scholarship in 1998 and completed a doctorate at Magdalen College, Oxford, in 2001.

== Career ==
=== Legal ===
Edelman was admitted to practice in the Supreme Court of Western Australia in 1998 after serving as an associate to Justice John Toohey in the High Court of Australia in 1997 and completing an articled clerkship at Blake Dawson Waldron. He was a member of the Chambers of Malcolm McCusker QC from 2001 until his appointment as a justice in 2011.

Edelman was called to the English bar in 2008 and was a member of One Essex Court chambers.

Edelman appeared as junior counsel to Malcolm McCusker on behalf of Andrew Mallard in Mallard's successful appeal to the High Court of Australia.

=== Academic ===
Edelman became a tutor at Keble College, Oxford, in 2005.

Following his appointment to the Supreme Court, Edelman continued to teach as an Adjunct Professor at the University of Queensland and University of Western Australia, as well as holding the honorary position of Conjoint Professor at the University of New South Wales.

Edelman is also a patron and former editor of the Oxford University Commonwealth Law Journal.

Edelman has been noted as having a "prodigious" record of publications. At the time of his appointment to the Supreme Court, his publications included six books and more than 80 articles, reviews, and notes.

=== Judicial ===
Edelman was appointed to the Supreme Court of Western Australia in April 2011 following the retirement of Justice Peter Blaxell. He took the oath of office on 22 July 2011. It was reported that, at the age of 37, Edelman was the youngest person to join the Supreme Court bench. However, at the welcome ceremony for Edelman, Chief Justice Wayne Martin noted that the reports were incorrect and in fact Sir Lawrence Jackson was appointed at the age of 36 in 1949.

In April 2015, Edelman was appointed to the Federal Court of Australia. He replaced Justice Peter Jacobson, who had retired in January 2015.

In November 2016, it was announced that Edelman would be appointed as a Justice of the High Court of Australia. He commenced the appointment when Justice Susan Kiefel became Chief Justice of Australia on 30 January 2017. He is the fourth youngest person to join the Court, after H. V. Evatt, Sir Edward McTiernan and Sir Owen Dixon.

== Notable judgments ==
- Love v Commonwealth of Australia [2020] HCA 3 - concerning the meaning of "aliens" under s 51(xix) of the Constitution.
- Palmer v Western Australia [2021] HCA 5 - concerning the validity of COVID-19 border directions and the operation of s 92 of the Constitution.
- WorkPac Pty Ltd v Rossato [2021] HCA 23 - concerning the characterisation of casual employment and the role of written contractual terms.
- Construction, Forestry, Maritime, Mining and Energy Union v Personnel Contracting Pty Ltd [2022] HCA 1 - concerning whether a labour-hire worker was an employee or an independent contractor.
- ZG Operations Australia Pty Ltd v Jamsek [2022] HCA 2 - concerning whether long-serving truck drivers were employees or independent contractors.
- Vanderstock v Victoria [2023] HCA 30 - concerning whether Victoria's ZLEV distance-based charge was an impermissible duty of excise under s 90 of the Constitution.
- Karpik v Carnival plc [2023] HCA 39 - concerning unfair contract terms and the extraterritorial application of the Australian Consumer Law to class-action waiver clauses.

== Honours and recognition ==
Edelman was appointed a Companion of the Order of Australia in the 2025 Australia Day Honours.

== Personal ==
Edelman is married and has two children.

== Bibliography ==
- Unjust Enrichment (2nd ed.). Bloomsbury Publishing. 2016. ISBN 9781782255628. (with Elise Bant)
- Unjust Enrichment in Commercial Law. Lawbook Company. 2008. ISBN 978-0455225043. (with Simone Degeling)
- Cases and Materials on the Law of Restitution (Revised ed.). Oxford University Press. 2007. ISBN 978-0199296514. (with Andrew S. Burrows and Ewan McKendrick)
- Unjust Enrichment in Australia. Oxford University Press. 2006. ISBN 0195517199. (with Elise Bant)
- Interest Awards in Australia. LexisNexis Butterworths. 2003. ISBN 0409318248. (with Derek Ian Cassidy)
- Gain-Based Damages: Contract, Tort, Equity and Intellectual Property. Bloomsbury Publishing. 2002. ISBN 1847316824.
- Gain-based Awards for Wrongs. University of Oxford. 2001.
