= Simon Steward (judge) =

Australian High Court justice since 2018 (born 1969)

The Honourable Justice Simon Steward AC

Justice of the High Court of Australia
- Incumbent
- Assumed office 1 December 2020
- Nominated by: Scott Morrison
- Appointed by: David Hurley
- Preceded by: Geoffrey Nettle

Judge of the Federal Court of Australia
- In office 1 February 2018 – 30 November 2020

Personal details
- Born: Simon Harry Peter Steward; 9 January 1969 (age 57) Melbourne, Victoria, Australia
- Education: Xavier College
- Alma mater: University of Melbourne
- Occupation: Barrister

Simon Harry Peter Steward (born 9 January 1969) is an Australian judge and former barrister currently serving as a Justice of the High Court of Australia. He was previously a judge of the Federal Court of Australia from 2018 until his appointment to the High Court.

== Education ==
Steward grew up in Melbourne, attending Sacred Heart School in Kew before going on to Xavier College. He graduated from the Melbourne Law School in 1991 with first-class honours. He later completed a Master of Laws degree in 2000 with a thesis on the constitutional limitation of taxation powers.

== Professional career ==
After graduating, Steward joined Mallesons Stephen Jaques (now King & Wood Mallesons) as a solicitor within its tax division. He was called to the Victorian Bar in 1999, specialising in revenue law, and was appointed Senior Counsel (SC) in 2009, later converting to Queen's Counsel (QC). He also taught at the Melbourne Law School as a senior fellow. Steward was president of the Victorian Tax Bar Association from 2013 to 2014.

== Judicial career ==
Steward was appointed to the Federal Court of Australia on 1 February 2018.

On 28 October 2020, Prime Minister Scott Morrison and Attorney-General Christian Porter announced that Steward and Jacqueline Gleeson would be appointed to the High Court of Australia to fill the vacancies caused by upcoming retirements of Geoffrey Nettle and Virginia Bell. His term began on 1 December 2020 following the compulsory retirement of Nettle. Although described as a "little-known tax expert", the Australian Financial Review reported that he enjoyed the backing of Victorian conservatives supportive of his black-letter approach to jurisprudence. He was reportedly endorsed by the Samuel Griffith Society.

Steward was appointed a Companion of the Order of Australia in the 2025 King's Birthday Honours for "eminent service to the law and to the judiciary, to legal education and training, to mentorship of legal practitioners, and as an advocate".

== Personal life ==
Steward met his wife Anne on a fine art course. The couple have two children.

According to The Australian, Steward has a "reputed love for all things British"; he placed a bust of Winston Churchill in his chambers.

== See also ==
- List of judges of the Federal Court of Australia
- List of justices of the High Court of Australia
