= Virginia Bell (judge) =

Australian judge

The Honourable Virginia Bell AC
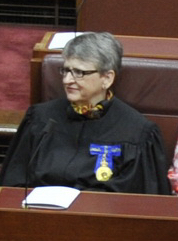

Justice of the High Court of Australia
- In office 3 February 2009 – 28 February 2021
- Nominated by: Kevin Rudd
- Appointed by: Quentin Bryce
- Preceded by: Michael Kirby
- Succeeded by: Jacqueline Gleeson

Judge of the Supreme Court of New South Wales
- In office 25 March 1999 – 19 December 2008

Judge of the New South Wales Court of Appeal
- In office 2008 – 19 December 2008

Personal details
- Born: 7 March 1951 (age 75) Sydney, New South Wales, Australia
- Education: SCEGGS Darlinghurst
- Alma mater: University of Sydney
- Occupation: Jurist

Virginia Margaret Bell (born 7 March 1951) is a retired Australian judge. She is a former Justice of the High Court of Australia, the highest court in the Australian court hierarchy. She was sworn in on 3 February 2009, and retired on 28 February 2021.

Previously a public defender, she assisted in the Wood Royal Commission into the New South Wales Police Service from 1995 until 1999. She was appointed a judge of the Supreme Court of New South Wales in 1999, before being appointed to the High Court. After her retirement, in 2022, she led an inquiry into former prime minister Scott Morrison's self-appointment to several ministerial positions. In 2026, Prime Minister Albanese selected her to lead a Royal Commission into antisemitism in Australia and social cohesion, following the 2025 Bondi Beach shooting.

== Early life and education ==
Virginia Margaret Bell was born on 7 March 1951 in Sydney, New South Wales, the daughter of a naval captain, John Bell. As a child, she lived for some years at the Garden Island naval base in Sydney, where her father was general manager. John Bell was estate manager for the University of Wollongong, and oversaw the design and layout of the campus. He was made a Fellow of the University in 1986. She has one brother.

Bell was educated at SCEGGS Darlinghurst, where she excelled academically and took an interest in drama.

She then attended both Dame Doris Fitton's School of Dramatic Art at the Independent Theatre and the University of Sydney. In 1976, she graduated from the drama school as well as from university, with a degree in law.

As a young woman, Bell was a prominent advocate of prison reform, and a member of the group Women Behind Bars.

== Legal career ==
Bell was admitted as a solicitor of New South Wales in 1977 and worked as a solicitor at the Redfern Legal Centre in Sydney from 1978 to 1984, initially as a volunteer. In that capacity she represented armed robber Darcy Dugan in 1981, and was involved in several landmark civil liberties cases. She was also instrumental in the establishment of the Prisoners' Legal Service.

On 20 December 1984, Bell was called to the NSW bar joining Frederick Jordan Chambers. She was appointed a public defender in 1986, returning to private practice in late 1989. During her time as public defender, she worked part-time as a commissioner on the Law Reform Commission of New South Wales.

Between 1982 and 1984, Bell was a member of the Board of Governors of the Law Foundation. She was one of the counsel assisting the Wood Royal Commission into the New South Wales Police Service between 1994 and 1997. On 6 November 1997, she was appointed Senior Counsel.

From 1997 to 1999, she served as a part-time Commissioner of the Law Reform Commission of New South Wales.

=== Judicial career ===
On 25 March 1999, Bell was sworn in as a judge of the Supreme Court of New South Wales. During her time on the Supreme Court, she presided over a defamation case brought by Rene Rivkin, holding that allegations of homosexuality were no longer defamatory at common law. From 2007 to 2008, she was president of the Australasian Institute of Judicial Administration, a research and educational institute founded in 1976. Funded by both Australian and New Zealand governments as well as subscription payments by members, the institute's aims include research into judicial administration and the provision of educational programmes about court administration and judicial systems, for people working within these systems. She also served as chair of the University of Wollongong Law Faculty Advisory Committee from 2007 to 2008.

Bell was elevated to the New South Wales Court of Appeal in early 2008, resigning on 19 December 2008 in order to be appointed to the High Court of Australia.

In December 2008, Attorney-General Robert McClelland announced that Bell would succeed Michael Kirby on the High Court. She was sworn in on 3 February 2009. She was the 48th person and the fourth woman appointed to the High Court since the federation of Australia in 1901.

Bell retired on 28 February 2021.

=== Significant cases ===
Bell was one of six High Court Justices who presided over the case Monis v The Queen in 2013, which was headed by Chief Justice Robert French. The case dealt with implied freedom of political communication, examining the constitutionality of a law that prevents people from targeting others through the mail using "offensive and harassing speech". In their judgments, Bell and the two other justices upheld this law, while three justices (including French) dissented.

== Other activities ==
Bell has long been involved in the LGBT and human rights issues, participating in the first Mardi Gras LGBT rights rally in Sydney in 1978, which was broken up by police. In 1979 she participated in the inaugural "Gays and the Law" forum as part of the National Summer Offensive for Gay Rights, where she advocated for the equal right of lesbian prisoners to conjugal visits.

Bell is a lover of theatre, and known for her sense of humour. Under the stage name "Ginger de Winter", she was barrel-spinner on television game shows, and was president of the "Australian Barrel Girls Association". She was patron of the Rose Scott Women Writers' Festival for some years.

Bell was appointed host of the ABC Radio National program Late Night Live in 1990, succeeding fellow lawyer Richard Ackland. She was replaced as host by Phillip Adams in 1991.

=== Speeches ===
Bell has been called upon to give a number of addresses and lectures during her time at the High Court, the transcripts of which are available online. These include:

- 2013: "Section 80 - The Great Constitutional Tautology", for The Lucinda Lecture, Monash University
- 2014: Tristan Jepson Memorial Foundation Lecture, honouring Tristan Jepson, a law graduate and comedic actor and writer who suicided aged 26 in 2004
- 2015: "Magna Carta – Resonances in the Common Law of Australia", Spring Conversazione, Melbourne
- 2016: "Equality, Proportionality and Dignity: The Guiding Principles for a Just Legal System", the Sir Ninian Stephen Lecture, University of Newcastle Conservatorium Concert Hall, Newcastle, New South Wales
- 2017: "Examining The Judge", speech at the launch of volume 40 of the University of New South Wales Law Journal
- 2018: Criminal Law Stream, Australian Bar Association & New South Wales Bar Association National Conference
- 2019: The Sir James Martin Oration, honouring SirJames Martin, who was premier of the Colony of New South Wales three times before becoming the fourth Chief Justice

== Post-retirement appointments ==
=== Inquiry into joint ministerial positions ===
On 26 August 2022, Prime Minister Anthony Albanese and Attorney-General Mark Dreyfus announced that the government had appointed Bell "to lead an inquiry into the appointment of former Prime Minister, the Hon Scott Morrison MP, to administer departments other than the Department of the Prime Minister and Cabinet and related matters". after Morrison had secretly appointed himself to five ministries without even his colleagues' knowledge. The report was published on 25 November.

=== Royal Commission into anti-Semitism ===
On 8 January 2026, Prime Minister Anthony Albanese announced a Royal Commission on Antisemitism and Social Cohesion, following the 2025 Bondi Beach shooting, to be led by Bell. Its terms of reference and overall direction have been supported by the Executive Council of Australian Jewry, the Zionist Federation of Australia, and the Business Council of Australia.

Mr. Albanese said that the appointment had been decided after consultation and discussion, after looking at over a dozen suggested names. However, there was nobody else of Bell's standing, as a former High Court justice and who has a background in criminal law and is "widely respected across the board". While various mainstream media have reported that some Jewish Australians wanted a commissioner whom they saw may be more sympathetic to anti-Semitism concerns, and Liberal politician Josh Frydenberg expressed his disagreement with the choice, the Law Council of Australia, which had advocated for the establishment of the Royal Commission, expressed appreciation for her appointment. LCA president Tania Wolff said that she is "an eminent Australian jurist", and that "the conduct of royal commissions are governed by clear and well-established legal principles... In Australia, judges decide matters impartially and independently, by applying the law to the evidence before them. They do not act on personal views, political considerations, or public pressure". Attorney-General Michelle Rowland said "Her experience speaks for itself".

== Recognition and honours ==
On 26 January 2012, Bell was appointed a Companion of the Order of Australia for "eminent service to the judiciary and to the law through leadership in criminal law reform and public policy development, to judicial administration, and as an advocate for the economically and socially disadvantaged".

On 19 December 2013, Bell received a Doctor of Laws honoris causa from the University of Wollongong. She was also a recipient of an honorary degree from the University of Sydney.

== Commentary ==
On her appointment to the High Court, Australian Law Reform Commission president David Weisbrot opined that Bell would be a "progressive" jurist in the tradition of Michael Kirby. Kate Hannon wrote in The Sydney Morning Herald that her appointment was "welcomed as redressing a lack of criminal law expertise on the bench of Australia's superior court, and as going some way towards correcting the gender imbalance". Commentator Natasha Stojanovich noted the "disproportionate media focus on Justice Bell's gender and commitment to social justice sadly distract from the strong merit of her appointment".

Jeremy Gans, a Melbourne Law School professor, wrote in 2018 that Bell's partnership with Susan Kiefel and Patrick Keane was "the most powerful bloc of judges in the court's history". Gans found that the three justices had been in agreement in 88 percent of the 116 cases where they had sat together.

== Personal life ==
As of 2009 Bell was living in inner Sydney with her partner, a barrister.

Bell has retained a strong interest in the arts and theatre throughout her life.
