= Susan Kiefel =

Australian judge (born 1954)

The Honourable Susan Kiefel AC KC
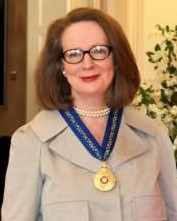
- Kiefel in 2011

Chief Justice of Australia
- In office 30 January 2017 – 5 November 2023
- Nominated by: Malcolm Turnbull
- Appointed by: Sir Peter Cosgrove
- Preceded by: Robert French
- Succeeded by: Stephen Gageler

Justice of the High Court of Australia
- In office 4 September 2007 – 30 January 2017
- Nominated by: John Howard
- Appointed by: Michael Jeffery
- Preceded by: Ian Callinan
- Succeeded by: James Edelman

Judge of the Federal Court of Australia
- In office 17 October 1994 – 4 September 2007
- Nominated by: Paul Keating
- Appointed by: Bill Hayden

Judge of the Supreme Court of Queensland
- In office 16 June 1993 – 16 October 1994
- Nominated by: Wayne Goss
- Appointed by: Leneen Forde

Personal details
- Born: 1954 (age 71–72) Cairns, Queensland, Australia
- Spouse: Michael Albrecht
- Relations: Russell Kiefel (brother)
- Education: Legal Profession Admission Board; Wolfson College, Cambridge
- Website: susankiefelackc.com

Susan Mary Kiefel (/ˈkiːfəl/; born 1954) is an Australian lawyer and barrister who was the 13th Chief Justice of Australia from 2017 to 2023. She concurrently served on the High Court of Australia from 2007 to 2023, previously being a judge of both the Supreme Court of Queensland and the Federal Court of Australia. Kiefel is the first woman to serve in the position of Chief Justice.

== Early life and education ==
Kiefel was born in Cairns, Queensland, in 1954. She attended Sandgate District State High School, leaving at the age of 15 upon completing year 10. In 1971, she completed secretarial training at Kangaroo Point Technical College on a scholarship. She worked as a secretary for a building society, an architect, and an exploration company before starting work as a receptionist for a group of barristers. During this time, she completed secondary school and began studying law.

In 1973, Kiefel joined a firm of solicitors as a legal clerk. Completing her education at night, she enrolled in the Barristers Admission Board course and passed her course with honours.

In 1984, while on sabbatical leave, she completed a Master of Laws (LLM) at the University of Cambridge, where she was awarded the C.J. Hamson Prize in Comparative Law and the Jennings Prize. In 2008, she was elected to an honorary fellowship of Wolfson College, Cambridge. She is a life fellow of the Australian Academy of Law.

== Career ==
=== Legal and judicial career ===
Kiefel was admitted to the bar in 1975. She became an honorary secretary of the Queensland Bar Association in 1978 and served on its committee in 1993. She was appointed as the first female Queen's Counsel in Queensland in 1987 and was appointed to the Human Rights and Equal Opportunity Commission in 1989. In May 1993, Kiefel was appointed to the Supreme Court of Queensland. The following year she was appointed by the Keating Government to the Supreme Court of Norfolk Island and was one of the first women to be appointed to the Federal Court of Australia on 17 October 1994, after Justice Deirdre O'Connor.

In October 2001, Kiefel was appointed Deputy President of the Australian Federal Police Disciplinary Tribunal and became its president in April 2004. In 2003, Kiefel was appointed as a part-time commissioner of the Australian Law Reform Commission, and was re-appointed for a further three years in 2006.

=== Appointment to the High Court ===
On 13 August 2007, Attorney-General Philip Ruddock announced Kiefel as the nominee to the High Court of Australia to replace the retiring High Court Justice Ian Callinan. Kiefel had previously been considered a favourite nominee to replace former High Court Justice Mary Gaudron when she retired in 2003, and again in 2005 as replacement for Justice Michael McHugh. Kiefel is the third female High Court Justice and the forty-sixth overall. Her appointment alongside incumbent Justice Susan Crennan marked the first time two women sat concurrently on the High Court bench.

Kiefel's nomination was met with support from the Australian Bar Association amid criticism of the lack of consultation by the Australian government. She was considered a conservative "black-letter" judge.

=== Chief Justice of Australia ===
On 29 November 2016, Prime Minister Malcolm Turnbull and Attorney-General George Brandis announced Kiefel's appointment as Chief Justice of Australia. The appointment took effect from 30 January 2017, following the retirement of Robert French. Kiefel is the first woman to be appointed as Chief Justice. Her seat on the court was filled by James Edelman.

Giving the inaugural Lord Atkin Lecture in November 2017, Kiefel expressed her disapproval of the prevalence of judicial dissent, which she believes should be reserved for only the most important cases. She said law students should devote more attention to "mundane majority opinion", and described judges who frequently dissent as "somewhat self-indulgent". She further observed that "humorous dissent may provide the author with fleeting popularity, but it may harm the image the public has of the court and its judges". An article in May 2018 noted that Kiefel had dissented in only two out of 164 cases before the High Court since 2014, classing her as one of the court's "great assenters" along with Patrick Keane and Virginia Bell.

==== High profile cases ====
Kiefel was on the panel that handed down a unanimous verdict during the 2017–18 Australian parliamentary eligibility crisis, in which several high-profile politicians lost their jobs owing to having dual citizenship, whether unknowingly or knowingly.

In June 2020, Kiefel announced that the High Court had in 2019 commissioned an independent investigation into sexual misconduct allegations against her former colleague Dyson Heydon. The inquiry, led by Vivienne Thom, concluded that Heydon had sexually harassed six female associates. In a statement, Kiefel said that she had apologised to the women on behalf of the court and that it had adopted recommendations from the inquiry.

She was one of three dissenters who held the minority view in a 4-3 split in Love v Commonwealth (2020), which found that Aboriginal Australians are not subject to the aliens power in section 51(xix) of the constitution. She stated that the majority had confused property rights with citizenship rights, and said that "race is irrelevant to the questions of citizenship and membership of the Australian body politic".

In general her judgments have been regarded as conservative, but ANU professor Heather Roberts commented that she was hard to label, and that she "values the court as an institution".

=== Retirement ===
On 15 June 2023, at the end of a hearing, Kiefel announced her retirement as of 5 November 2023. She gave her farewell address to the court on 16 October 2023. Her successor is Justice Stephen Gageler.

== Recognition and honours ==
In August 2009, Justice Kiefel was granted an honorary doctorate from Griffith University. Justice Kiefel was chosen to recognise her distinguished contributions to the legal profession and for leading the way for women in the industry.

On 13 June 2011, she was named a companion of the Order of Australia for eminent service to the law and to the judiciary, to law reform and to legal education in the areas of ethics, justice and governance.

== Personal life ==
While at Wolfson College, Kiefel met her future husband, Michael Albrecht, a social anthropologist, when she became a member of the college rowing crew and Albrecht was her coach.

Actor Russell Kiefel (1951–2016) was her brother.

== See also ==
- List of first women lawyers and judges by nationality

Legal offices
Preceded by Robert French	Chief Justice of Australia; 2017–2023	Succeeded by Stephen Gageler
