= Michael McHugh =

Justice of the High Court of Australia

The Honourable Michael McHugh AC KC

Justice of the High Court of Australia
- In office 14 February 1989 – 31 October 2005
- Nominated by: Bob Hawke
- Appointed by: Ninian Stephen
- Preceded by: Ronald Wilson
- Succeeded by: Susan Crennan

Personal details
- Born: 1 November 1935 (age 91) Newcastle, New South Wales, Australia
- Spouse: Jeannette McHugh (m. 1960)

Michael Hudson McHugh (born 1 November 1935) is a former justice of the High Court of Australia; the highest court in the Australian court hierarchy.

== Early years ==
The son of a miner and steelworker, McHugh left school at 15 despite excelling academically and in rugby league at Marist Brothers, Newcastle. For the next seven years, he worked as a telegram boy, crane chaser, sawmill worker and labourer until he enrolled at evening school. At 22, with his Leaving Certificate in hand, he started studying law as a student-at-law with the Legal Profession Admission Board and taught by the University of Sydney.

== Legal career ==
McHugh was admitted to the New South Wales Bar in 1961 after taking the Barristers Admission Board Examinations.

He was appointed Queen's Counsel (QC) in 1973 and was Vice President of the New South Wales Bar Association, 1978–81, and later President, 1981–83.

In 1980, he was counsel for Wyong Shire Council in Wyong Shire Council v Shirt, a landmark negligence case on breach of duty. He was President of the Australian Bar Association 1983–84.

=== NSW Court of Appeal judicial appointment ===
He was appointed as a Judge of Appeal of the New South Wales Court of Appeal on 30 October 1984.

=== High Court appointment ===
He was appointed as a judge of the High Court in February 1989, a position he held until his retirement in October 2005 in accordance with Section 72 of the Australian Constitution, which states that Justices of the High Court must retire from office upon turning 70. He was succeeded by Justice Susan Crennan, then of the Federal Court of Australia.

=== Post-retirement ===
After he retired from the High Court, McHugh was appointed as one of the Non-Permanent Justices of the Court of Final Appeal in Hong Kong. Another Australian judge on the Court of Final Appeal is Sir Anthony Mason.

McHugh was appointed to head the Special Commission of Inquiry into the Greyhound Racing Industry in New South Wales on 6 May 2015. McHugh provided his report on 16 June 2016, finding overwhelming evidence of systemic animal cruelty. Following the report, the Government of New South Wales decided to shut down the greyhound racing in NSW from 1 July 2017, a decision that was reversed on 11 October 2016.

McHugh currently practises as an independent mediator and arbitrator at Eleven Wentworth in Sydney.

== Family ==
He is married to former Australian federal MP and Minister Jeannette McHugh.

== Honours ==
- He received Australia's highest civil honour when he was made a Companion of the Order of Australia (AC) in 1989.
