= Michelle Gordon =

Australian High Court justice since 2015 (born 1964)

The Honourable Justice Michelle Gordon AC
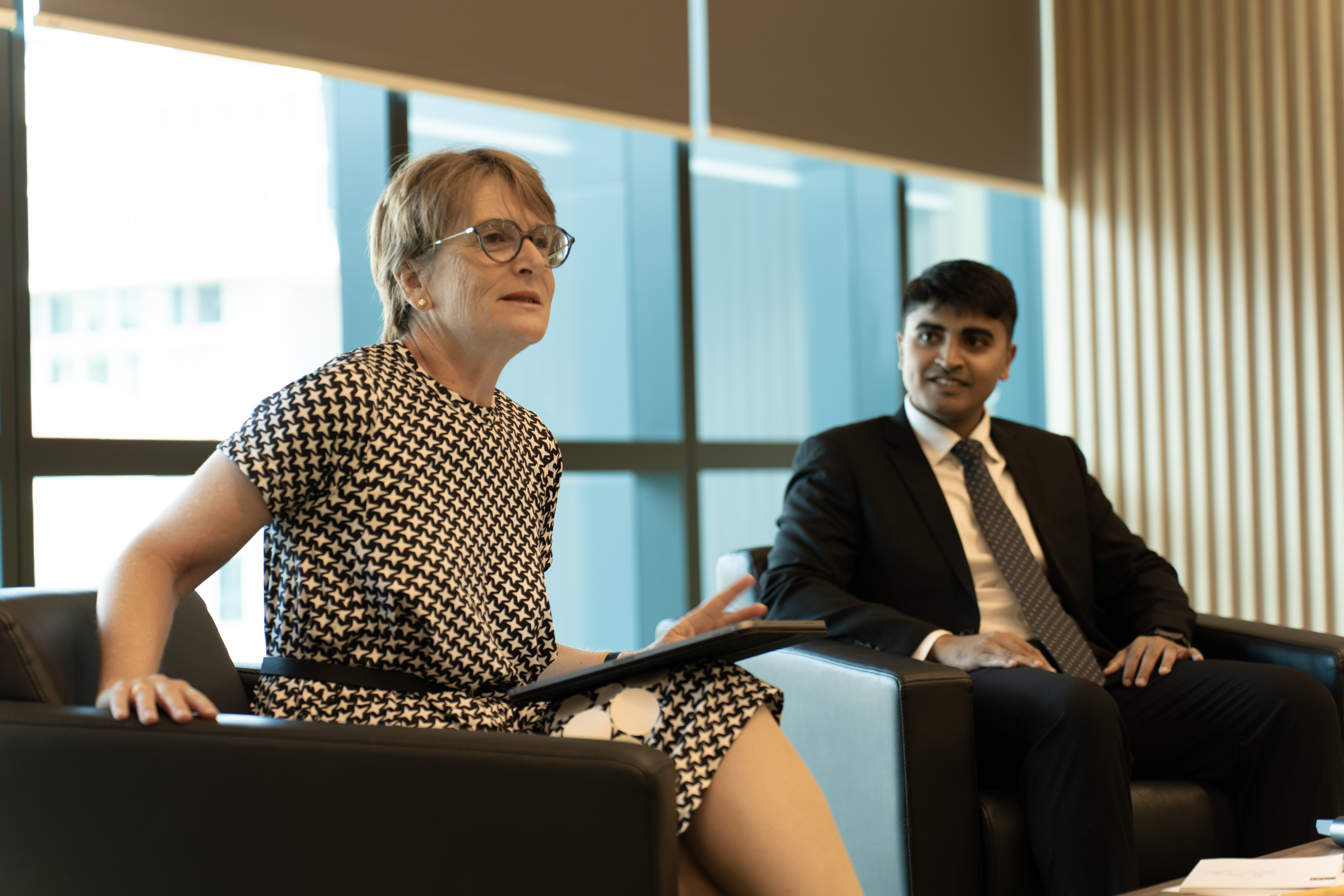

Justice of the High Court of Australia
- Incumbent
- Assumed office 9 June 2015
- Nominated by: Tony Abbott
- Appointed by: Sir Peter Cosgrove
- Preceded by: Kenneth Hayne

Personal details
- Born: Michelle Marjorie Gordon; 19 November 1964 (age 61) Perth, Western Australia
- Spouse: Kenneth Hayne (m. 1995)
- Children: 1
- Education: University of Western Australia
- Profession: Barrister

Michelle Marjorie Gordon (born 19 November 1964) is a Justice of the High Court of Australia. She was appointed to the High Court in June 2015. Prior to her appointment, she was a Justice of the Federal Court of Australia, to which she was appointed in 2007.

== Early life ==
Gordon was born in Perth, Western Australia in 1964, to George Gordon and Coral Troy, and received her secondary schooling at St Mary's Anglican Girls' School and Presbyterian Ladies' College. She graduated from the University of Western Australia with a Bachelor of Laws (LL.B., B.Juris.).

== Career ==
=== Legal career ===
From 1987, Gordon practised as a solicitor in the Western Australian firm Robinson Cox, and in 1992 was a senior associate at Arthur Robinson & Hedderwicks. In 1992, she became a barrister and in 2003, took silk as a Senior Counsel on the Victorian Bar.

=== Judicial career ===
Gordon was appointed a judge of the Federal Court of Australia on 20 April 2007. In one judgment, Gordon said that Coles Supermarkets "threatened harm to suppliers if they didn't meet their demands". In 2014, she ruled against ANZ in a class action on credit card fees. ANZ appealed this decision and were successful in overturning her findings at the Full Court of the Federal Court in 2015. The applicant in the class action then appealed to the High Court of Australia, which heard the appeal and handed down the decision after Gordon was appointed to the High Court (though without her sitting on the appeal). A majority of the High Court dismissed the appeal in 2016, ruling in favour of ANZ.

In April 2015, the Abbott Government announced that Justice Gordon would replace her husband, Kenneth Hayne, on the bench of the High Court of Australia upon his compulsory retirement on reaching the age of 70. Justice Gordon was sworn in on 9 June 2015.

In 2023, Gordon gave the inaugural Margaret Stone Lecture, a joint initiative of the University of New South Wales and Herbert Smith Freehills.
