= Stephen Gageler =

Chief Justice of Australia since 2023

The Honourable Chief Justice Stephen Gageler AC
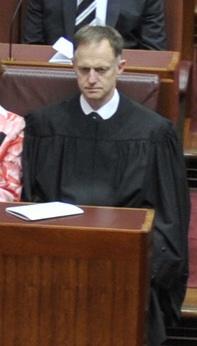

Chief Justice of Australia
- Incumbent
- Assumed office 6 November 2023
- Appointed by: David Hurley on the advice of Anthony Albanese
- Preceded by: Susan Kiefel

Justice of the High Court of Australia
- In office 9 October 2012 – 6 November 2023
- Appointed by: Quentin Bryce on the advice of Julia Gillard
- Preceded by: William Gummow
- Succeeded by: Robert Beech-Jones

Solicitor-General of Australia
- In office 1 September 2008 – 9 October 2012
- Preceded by: David Bennett
- Succeeded by: Justin Gleeson

Personal details
- Born: Sandy Hollow, New South Wales, Australia
- Spouse: Carla
- Children: 3
- Education: Australian National University (BEcon, LLB); Harvard University (LLM)
- Occupation: Barrister

Stephen John Gageler (/ɡeɪɡlər/;) is an Australian judge. He has been a Justice of the High Court of Australia since 2012 and was appointed Chief Justice of Australia in 2023. He previously served as Solicitor-General of Australia from 2008 to 2012. He is a graduate of the Australian National University and Harvard Law School and was a barrister in private practice before his appointment as solicitor-general.

== Early life and education ==
Stephen John Gageler was born and raised in the small community of Sandy Hollow, New South Wales, where his father, John, and grandfather, Clive, were sawmillers operating his grandfather's company.

His interest in law was sparked during a stint of work experience in a solicitor's office in year 9, when he also attended local Magistrates Court. The solicitor referred him to barrister Bryan Beaumont, at the time the owner of a property near Gageler's boyhood home, who later became a judge of the Federal Court of Australia.

Gageler's primary school education was at a one-teacher school, Giant's Creek Primary School, about 3 km from Sandy Hollow. His secondary education was at Muswellbrook High School. He graduated from the Australian National University with a Bachelor of Economics in 1980 and a Bachelor of Laws with First Class Honours in 1982. He resided at Ursula College (now Ursula Hall) for his first two years at ANU, and at Bruce Hall in his third year.

He became an associate for High Court Justice Sir Anthony Mason. He then attended Harvard Law School on a Fulbright scholarship, graduating with a Master of Laws degree in 1987.

== Legal career ==
Upon return from Harvard Law School, Gageler was called to the bar in Sydney where, for 20 years, he worked as a barrister specialising in constitutional, administrative, revenue and commercial law. He was made a Senior Counsel in 2000. Gageler represented, among others, Betfair, the Humane Society, the ACT Government, and John Howard (the Prime Minister of Australia). Gageler was assistant counsel for the Commercial Radio Enquiry in 1999.

=== Solicitor-General ===
Gageler was appointed the Solicitor-General of Australia on 1 September 2008, based in Canberra, Australian Capital Territory. This position is the second law officer of the Commonwealth, advising the Government and appearing as counsel in significant cases.

Gageler defended the Commonwealth unsuccessfully in the Malaysian solution challenge and successfully in the tobacco plain packaging cases in 2012.

== High Court of Australia ==
Gageler's appointment as a Justice of the High Court of Australia was announced on 21 August 2012 by the Attorney-General of Australia, Nicola Roxon, for whom Gageler had worked as Solicitor-General of Australia since 2008. Roxon announced that Gageler would replace Justice William Gummow on his retirement in October 2012.

Gageler is the second solicitor-general to be appointed to the High Court, after Anthony Mason's appointment in 1972, and the first to be appointed directly to the court with no prior judicial experience – Mason had previously served on the Supreme Court of New South Wales.

On 22 August 2023 the Federal Government announced that Gageler would succeed Susan Kiefel as the 14th Chief Justice of the High Court upon her retirement at the end of the year.

== Recognition and honours ==
Gageler's likeness appears in a painting from 2003 that was commissioned to mark the High Court's centenary. The painting depicts the High Court sitting on Tuesday 29 April 2003 to hear the case Purvis v State of New South Wales [2003] HCA 62. The artist, Robert Hannaford, painted the Full Bench (seven member) hearing. Gageler was arguing the case for the appellant and is shown standing at the lectern addressing the court.

In 2017 Gageler was appointed a Companion of the Order of Australia for eminent service to the law and to the judiciary through contributions in the areas of constitutional, public, international, common and criminal law, to legal reform, education and academic discourse, and to professional organisations.

== Personal life ==
Gageler met his wife, Carla, while at ANU. They have a daughter and two sons. The family attends a Roman Catholic church, through the influence of Carla, although Gageler considers himself an Anglican.

Gageler has a black belt in taekwondo, a sport that he took up in his early 40s after seeing his sons training. He took three years to attain the black belt. He trains several times a week.

Government offices
Preceded by David Bennett	Solicitor-General of Australia; 2008–2012	Succeeded by Justin Gleeson
Legal offices
Preceded by Susan Kiefel	Chief Justice of Australia; 2023–present	Incumbent
