= Robert French =

Former Chief Justice of Australia

The Honourable Robert French AC
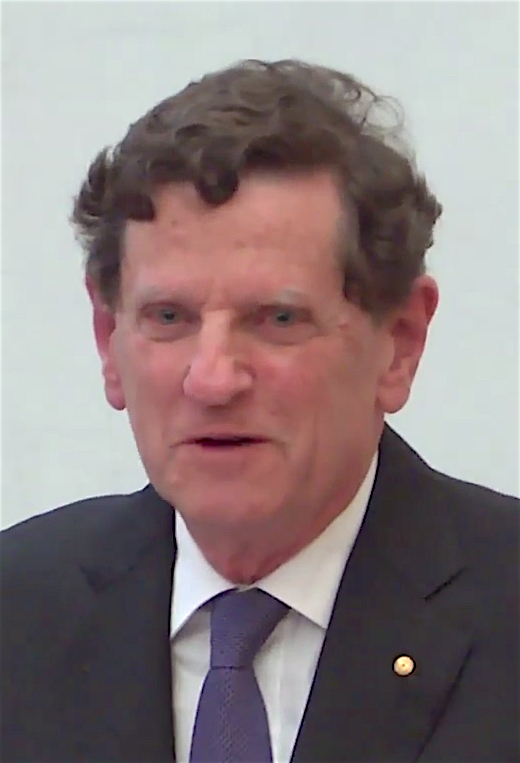

Chief Justice of Australia
- In office 1 September 2008 – 29 January 2017
- Nominated by: Kevin Rudd
- Appointed by: Michael Jeffery
- Preceded by: Murray Gleeson
- Succeeded by: Susan Kiefel
Other offices
Judge of the Federal Court of Australia
In office 25 November 1986 – 1 September 2008
Nominated by	Bob Hawke
Appointed by	Ninian Stephen
Additional Judge Supreme Court of the ACT
In office November 2004 – 1 September 2008
Nominated by	Kevin Rudd
Appointed by	Michael Jeffery
Preceded by	Murray Gleeson
Succeeded by	Susan Kiefel
Judge of the Supreme Court of Fiji
In office 2003–2004
Judge of the Singapore International Commercial Court
Incumbent
Assumed office 5 January 2018
Nominated by	Lee Hsien Loong
Appointed by	Halimah Yacob
Preceded by	Dyson Heydon
Non-Permanent Judge of the Court of Final Appeal of Hong Kong
In office 31 May 2017 – 31 March 2025
Appointed by	Leung Chun-ying
15th Chancellor of University of Western Australia
Incumbent
Assumed office December 2017
Nominated by	Mark McGowan
Appointed by	Kerry Sanderson
Preceded by	Michael Chaney AO
1st Chancellor of Edith Cowan University
In office 1991–1997
Nominated by	Carmen Lawrence
Appointed by	Francis Burt
Preceded by	University created
Succeeded by	Robert Nicholson

Personal details
- Born: 1947 (age 78–79) Perth, Western Australia
- Spouse: Valerie J. French
- Education: University of Western Australia

Chinese name
- Chinese: 范禮全
Transcriptions
Yue: Cantonese
- Yale Romanization: Faahn Láih Chyùhn
- Jyutping: Faan^{6} Lai^{5} Cyun^{4}

Robert Shenton French (born 1947) is a former judge of the Federal Court of Australia and was Chief Justice of the High Court of Australia from 2008 to 2017. From 2017 to 2024, he was chancellor of the University of Western Australia, of which he is a graduate. He served as an overseas non-permanent judge of the Hong Kong Court of Final Appeal from 2017 to 2025.

== Early life and education ==
Robert Shenton French was born in Perth, Western Australia, in 1947.

He was educated at St. Louis School (now John XXIII College) in Perth. In 1964 he was one of two students from Western Australia to attend the International Science School, then known as the Nuclear Research Foundation Summer Science School, at the University of Sydney.

French attended the University of Western Australia (UWA) in Perth, where he graduated with a Bachelor of Science in physics in 1968. He then continued with further study at UWA, earning a Bachelor of Laws in 1971. He said later that he had enrolled in law "with no particular idea of being a lawyer", but after realising that he "was not going to be a great theoretical physicist". He was president of the university's Liberal Club at UWA.

== Career ==
In 1969, at the age of 22, French contested the safe Labor Federal seat of Fremantle for the Liberal Party, which he lost to Kim Beazley, Sr. He later said: "Fortunately I lost. I do not think I would have made a very good politician... It was an enjoyable learning experience. It involved the kind of valuable interaction with people whom I would never normally have encountered. That has served me well in later life." He is a close friend of Kim Beazley, Jr.

In 1972, French was admitted as a barrister and solicitor in Western Australia. He worked on important cases, such as the High Court case Yager v The Queen, which focused on complex matters of law and botanical science.

The Hawke government appointed French to the Federal Court in 1986, at the age of 39.

During the Tampa Affair in 2001, French was part of the Full Court of the Federal Court that reversed the order of habeas corpus that had been earlier granted by a single judge.

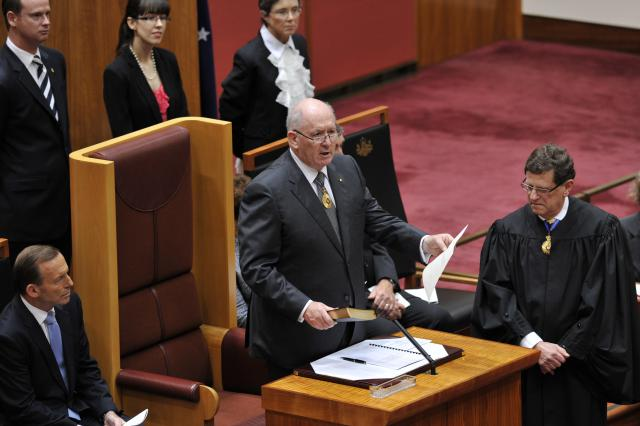
Chief Justice French (right) swearing in Governor–General Peter Cosgrove in March 2014.

On 30 July 2008, Prime Minister Kevin Rudd announced that French would succeed Murray Gleeson as Chief Justice of the High Court of Australia. He was sworn in on 1 September 2008. He became the first chief justice, and the third justice overall (after Sir Ronald and John Toohey), from Western Australia. He was the first Chief Justice of the High Court not to have taken silk at appointment.

French retired as Chief Justice on 29 January 2017. He was succeeded by Susan Kiefel.

On 18 January 2017, French was appointed a non-permanent judge of the Court of Final Appeal of the Hong Kong Special Administrative Region. He was given the Chinese name "范禮全" by the Hong Kong Judiciary. In June 2024, he remained in the position, along with other Australian judges Patrick Keane, William Gummow, and James Allsop, after British judge Jonathan Sumption resigned, criticising the judiciary of Hong Kong after 14 prominent democratic activists were convicted for subversion. French resigned on 31 March 2025, stating: "I reject the proposition that [the overseas judges] are somehow complicit in the application by the executive of national security laws or somehow confer on them a spurious legitimacy".

He has also served as an international commercial court judge on the DIFC Courts in Dubai.

== Other roles ==
French held a number of other positions during his time as Chief Justice, notably serving as chancellor of Edith Cowan University (1991–1997), chairman of the National Native Title Tribunal (1994–1998), and on the Supreme Court of Fiji (2003–2008). After his retirement from the position, on 20 June 2017, the University of Western Australia announced French's appointment as its 15th chancellor. He succeeded Michael Chaney AO as chancellor in November 2017. He is due to end his term at the end of 2024.

He was part-time Commissioner of the Australian Law Reform Commission (2006–2008), Additional Judge of the Supreme Court of the ACT (2004–2008), council member of the Australian Institute of Judicial Administration (1992–1998), chancellor of Edith Cowan University (1991–1997), member of the Law Reform Commission of Western Australia (1986), chairman of the Town Planning Appeals Tribunal of Western Australia (1986), associate member of the Australian Trade Practices Commission (1983–1986), member of the Legal Aid Commission of Western Australia (1983–1986), member of the Barristers' Board of Western Australia (1979–1986), and chairman of the Aboriginal Legal Service of Western Australia (1973–1975).

== Beliefs and positions ==
=== On politics ===
Although once the President of the Liberal Club of the University of Western Australia, French's views are described as being closer to socially progressive, small–l liberal, and moderate.

=== On republicanism ===
French said in a WA Law Society speech in May 2008:

"It is unacceptable in contemporary Australia that the legal head of the Australian state... can never be chosen by the people or their representatives, cannot be other than a member of the Anglican Church, can never be other than British and can never be an indigenous person."

=== On Indigenous issues ===
Justice French is known for working for the rights of Indigenous Australians: in the early 1970s, he helped found the WA Aboriginal Legal Service. He was also the first president of the National Native Title Tribunal, from 1994 to 1998.

At his swearing-in ceremony as Chief Justice, French specifically referred to the long history of Indigenous Australia:

Recognition of their presence is no mere platitude. The history of Australia's Indigenous people dwarfs, in its temporal sweep, the history that gave rise to the Constitution under which this court was created. Our awareness and recognition of that history is becoming, if it has not already become, part of our national identity.

However, the "French Testing" incident has coloured the legacy of French on Indigenous issues. French admitted his "error" when he explained the incident:

As I soon discovered, the responsibilities of an administrator trying to develop procedures to implement a legal process are very different from those of a judge required to decide a particular case about whether an administrator's decision is legally flawed. The Tribunal was judicially reviewed on many occasions. The high point or low point, depending on your point of view, occurred after I had refused registration of a claim by the Waanyi people over land the subject of the proposed Century Zinc mine in North Queensland. I refused registration on the basis that the application could not succeed because of the extinguishing effects of historical pastoral leases in the area. I took the view that observations about the extinguishing effects of leases made by Brennan J in Mabo put the matter beyond doubt. My refusal to register the claim was an administrative act in the application of a test designed to screen out hopeless claims. The decision was overturned by the High Court in North Ganalanja[2] with such moral enthusiasm that the Court gave judgment immediately and reasons later. In so doing, it described my approach as "tantamount to a proleptic exercise of federal jurisdiction". To add insult to injury, members of the Waanyi people were sitting in Court wearing T-shirts with the message "Ban French Testing". I have no doubt, in retrospect, that I was properly found to have been in error. The considerations influencing my approach were those of the administrator, the urgent need to get the process moving and to establish its credibility in the face of ongoing attacks. There was a legal bottleneck on the issue of the relationship between pastoral leases and native title which was not resolved until the decision in Wik. Many ill-prepared applications were being lodged and upon registration were entitled to procedural rights affecting third party interests particularly in relation to mining and the release of Crown land for development around regional centres. I learned a useful lesson from all of this and that is that the worldview and culture of the administrator which I had adopted is very different from that of the courts.

=== On the 2023 Voice referendum ===
In an address at the National Press Club on 5 October 2023, French spoke in favour of establishing the Indigenous Voice to Parliament, ahead of the referendum on the matter. He criticised the No campaign's slogan, "if you don't know, vote no", as well as some of their main arguments against the Voice, including their argument that it posed a legal risk, dismissing this as "misguided". French also observed that the Voice would instead “provide a new impetus and new mechanism to address the generational effects of the collision of our histories” and will do so by providing an opportunity for “coordinated, national advice from a First People’s body”.

== Awards and recognition ==
- Honorary Doctor of Laws, Edith Cowan University, 1998
- Western Australian Citizen of the Year – Professions, 1998
- Centenary Medal, 2001, for service as President of the National Native Title Tribunal and as a Federal Court judge
- Companion of the Order of Australia, 2010, for eminent service to the law and to the judiciary, to legal education and administration in the areas of constitutional, competition and native title law, and to legal reform.
- Life Fellow, Australian Academy of Law

== Personal life ==
French married Valerie J. French, who completed her LL.B. at UWA in 1971 and has served as the president of the Children's Court of Western Australia.

French is a fan of the Fremantle Dockers AFL team, and likes science fiction.

Legal offices
Preceded by Murray Gleeson	Chief Justice of Australia; 2008–2017	Succeeded by Susan Kiefel
Preceded by None	Non-Permanent Judge of the Court of Final Appeal of Hong Kong; 2017–2025	Succeeded by none
