= Chief Justice of Australia =

Presiding justice of the High Court of Australia

- Incumbent; Stephen Gageler since 6 November 2023
- Style: The Honourable
- Appointer: Governor-General on the advice of the attorney-general
- Term length: No set term, though retirement is mandatory at age 70
- Inaugural holder: Sir Samuel Griffith
- Formation: 5 October 1903
- Salary: $672,630
- Website: www.hcourt.gov.au

The chief justice of Australia is the presiding justice of the High Court of Australia and the highest-ranking judicial officer in the Commonwealth of Australia. The incumbent is Stephen Gageler, since 6 November 2023.

== Constitutional basis ==
The office of chief justice is established under section 71 of the Constitution of Australia, which establishes the High Court as consisting of a chief justice and at least two other justices. The court was constituted by, and its first members were appointed under, the Judiciary Act 1903, with the first appointments to the High Court commencing on 5 October 1903.

== Role ==
The chief justice is first among equals among the justices of the High Court, and the position differs little from that of the other justices. All justices, including the chief justice, are appointed by the governor-general of Australia, on the advice of the federal government. They can be removed only by the governor-general, on a request from both houses of the federal parliament, although this has never been done. Since 1977, justices have been required to retire at the age of seventy. (Previously, an appointment was for life). The one substantial difference between a chief justice and the other justices of the court is that, when the opinion of the court is evenly divided, where exercising its original jurisdiction and not appellate jurisdiction, the side of the question that is supported by the chief justice prevails.

The chief justice often acts as the governor-general's deputy, especially at ceremonies such as the opening of Parliament after an election. Chief Justice Samuel Griffith was several times consulted by governors-general on the exercise of the reserve powers. However, Chief Justice Garfield Barwick created controversy during the 1975 Australian constitutional crisis when he advised Governor-General Sir John Kerr on the constitutional legality of dismissing a prime minister—especially as the prime minister, Gough Whitlam, had refused Kerr's request for permission to consult Barwick or to act on any advice except Whitlam's own.

The chief justice also administers the oath of allegiance and the oath of office to the governor-general-designate when they take up their appointment.

== List ==
There is a strong tradition of appointing new chief justices from within the existing ranks of the High Court. Out of the fourteen chief justices, eight were incumbent puisne justices on the High Court. Others have included incumbent chief justices of states (Samuel Griffith and Murray Gleeson) and incumbent attorneys-general (John Latham and Garfield Barwick). Uniquely, Robert French was appointed directly to the chief justiceship from a lower federal court, while Adrian Knox was appointed as a barrister in private practice with no judicial experience.

No.	Image	Chief Justice	Tenure	Nominating Prime Minister	State	Previous Post
1		Sir Samuel Griffith (1845–1920)	5 October 1903 – 17 October 1919 (16 years)	Alfred Deakin	Queensland	Chief Justice of Queensland (1893–1903)
2		Sir Adrian Knox (1863–1932)	18 October 1919 – 31 March 1930 (10 years, 5 months)	Billy Hughes	New South Wales	Barrister in private practice
3		Sir Isaac Isaacs (1855–1948)	2 April 1930 – 21 January 1931 (9 months)	James Scullin	Victoria	Justice of the High Court (1906–1930)
4		Sir Frank Gavan Duffy (1852–1936)	22 January 1931 – 1 October 1935 (4 years, 8 months)	James Scullin	Victoria	Justice of the High Court (1913–1931)
5		Sir John Latham (1877–1964)	11 October 1935 – 7 April 1952 (16 years, 5 months)	Joseph Lyons	Victoria	Attorney-General of Australia (1932–1934)
6		Sir Owen Dixon (1886–1972)	18 April 1952 – 13 April 1964 (11 years, 11 months)	Sir Robert Menzies	Victoria	Justice of the High Court (1929–1952)
7		Sir Garfield Barwick (1903–1997)	27 April 1964 – 11 February 1981 (16 years, 9 months)	Sir Robert Menzies	New South Wales	Attorney-General of Australia (1958–1964)
8		Sir Harry Gibbs (1917–2005)	12 February 1981 – 5 February 1987 (5 years, 11 months)	Malcolm Fraser	Queensland	Justice of the High Court (1970–1981)
9		Sir Anthony Mason (1925–2026)	6 February 1987 – 20 April 1995 (8 years, 2 months)	Bob Hawke	New South Wales	Justice of the High Court (1972–1987)
10		Sir Gerard Brennan (1928–2022)	21 April 1995 – 21 May 1998 (3 years, 1 month)	Paul Keating	Queensland	Justice of the High Court (1981–1995)
11		Murray Gleeson (born 1938)	22 May 1998 – 29 August 2008 (10 years, 3 months)	John Howard	New South Wales	Chief Justice of New South Wales (1988–1998)
12		Robert French (born 1947)	1 September 2008 – 29 January 2017 (8 years, 4 months)	Kevin Rudd	Western Australia	Judge of the Federal Court of Australia (1986–2008)
13		Susan Kiefel (born 1954)	30 January 2017 – 5 November 2023 (6 years, 9 months)	Malcolm Turnbull	Queensland	Justice of the High Court (2007–2017)
14		Stephen Gageler (born 1958)	6 November 2023 – present (3 years)	Anthony Albanese	New South Wales	Justice of the High Court (2012–2023)

Chief Justice Sir John Latham took a leave of absence from the office from 1940 to 1941 to serve as Australia's first ambassador to Japan. Sir George Rich was Acting Chief Justice in his absence.
