= Huddart, Parker & Co Pty Ltd v Moorehead =

Australian constitutional law case

- Court: High Court of Australia
- Full case name: Huddart, Parker & Co Pty Ltd v Moorehead; Appleton v Moorehead
- Decided: 7 June 1909
- Citations: [1909] HCA 36, (1909) 8 CLR 330

Case history
- Prior action: Court of Petty Sessions 28 Sep 1908

Court membership
- Judges sitting: Griffith CJ, Barton, O'Connor, Isaacs and Higgins JJ

Case opinions
- (5:0) the inquiry powers authorized by section 15B of the Australian Industries Preservation Act 1906 were not an exercise of the judicial power of the Commonwealth. (4:1) Sections 5 and 8 of the Act were beyond the corporations power of the Commonwealth per Griffith CJ, Barton, O'Connor & Higgins JJ

Laws applied
- Overruled by
- Amalgamated Society of Engineers v Adelaide Steamship Co Ltd (Engineers' case) [1920] HCA 54, (1920) 28 CLR 129

Keywords
- Australian constitutional law; judicial power; corporations power

Huddart, Parker & Co Pty Ltd v Moorehead is a leading decision by the High Court of Australia that dealt with two issues under the Australian Constitution, the identification and extent of judicial power that is vested in the courts and the corporations power of the Parliament. The Court unanimously held that the inquiry provisions of the Australian Industries Preservation Act 1906 were not an exercise of judicial power. The judgement of Griffith CJ in particular continues to be cited in relation to its examination of the identification and extent of judicial power. The court, however, divided on the proper approach to the corporations power. The majority, Griffith CJ, Barton & O'Connor JJ, strongly influenced by the now discredited doctrine of reserved State powers, held that the corporations power was to be construed narrowly because the trade and commerce power did not include intrastate trade and commerce. While the reserved powers doctrine was unambiguously rejected by the High Court in 1920, Huddart, Parker was not formally overruled by the High Court until Strickland v Rocla Concrete Pipes Ltd (1971).

== Background ==
The case was the first in a series of cases in which members of a cartel, described as the "Coal Vend" were prosecuted under the Australian Industries Preservation Act, commonly referred to as the Anti-trust law. The Act sought to ensure freedom of trade and commerce, protection from unfair competition and preventing price fixing and monopolies. Sections 4 and 7 of the Act were directed to conduct in relation to "trade or commerce with other countries or among the States" relying on the trade and commerce power while sections 5 and 8 of the Act were directed to conduct of foreign, trading or financial corporations, relying on the corporations power. The Act was amended to give the Comptroller-General of Customs investigative powers including requiring people to answer questions.

The original Coal Vend cartel in Newcastle operated between 1872 and 1880 and was effective in raising the price of coal from 7 shillings to 14 shillings a ton. A new Coal Vend cartel began in around 1906 that had horizontal (coal miners) and vertical (shipping companies) dimensions. The coal miners were organised as the Associated Northern Collieries, which comprised virtually all of the proprietors of coal mines in Newcastle and Maitland. Huddart, Parker & Co was an Australian shipping company, one of the major coastal shippers in Australia at a time when shipping was the principal means of interstate and trans-Tasman transport. Appleton was the manager of Huddart, Parker & Co at the time. The other shipping companies initially involved were Adelaide Steamship, Howard Smith Co and McIlwraith McEacharn & Co, each of which had colliery interests. Moorehead was an officer of Customs who wanted the answer to questions concerning an alleged arrangement that:

1. Huddart, Parker would only purchase or ship coal from certain mining companies;
2. those mining companies would only use 5 listed shipping companies, Huddart, Parker, Adelaide Steamship Co, Howard Smith Co, McIlwraith McEacharn Pty Ltd and Union Steam Ship Company of NZ; and
3. Huddart, Parker had entered into various price fixing agreements about coal and shipping.

There was a subtle difference between the requests in that Huddart, Parker was told it was suspected of contravening subsections 5(1) and 8(1) of the Act while Appleton, the manager of Huddart, Parker was told that the contraventions were of subsections 4(1)(a) and 7(1) of the Act. Both Huddart, Parker and Appleton were charged with having refused to answer the questions. Both were convicted in the Court of Petty Sessions and fined A£5.

The convictions were challenged in the High Court on three grounds:

1. sections 5 and 8 of the Australian Industries Preservation Act 1906 were beyond the corporations power of the Commonwealth;
2. section 15B was an exercise of judicial power and beyond the power of the Commonwealth to make; and
3. Huddart, Parker and Appleton were denied natural justice in not being given an opportunity to be heard.

== Decision ==
=== Judicial Power ===
The Court unanimously held that the power of inquiry or investigation was not the exercise of judicial power. Griffiths CJ, with whom Barton J agreed, relied on the decision in Cox v Coleridge holding that a preliminary inquiry as to whether there was sufficient ground for a person to be tried was not a judicial function. His Honour held that 'judicial power' means the power to

decide controversies between its subjects, or between itself and its subjects, whether the rights relate to life, liberty or property. The exercise of this power does not begin until some tribunal which has power to give a binding and authoritative decision (whether subject to appeal or not) is called upon to take action.

The other judges reached a similar conclusion, for reasons that were largely consistent. O'Connor J held that the power of inquiry was necessarily included in the executive functions of government. Issacs J held that judicial power connected the determination of rights in relation to life, liberty or property of a person. Higgins J did not refer to the argument in any detail, noting simply that he concurred with his colleagues on the issue.

The conclusion that these were powers of inquiry or investigation, and the failure to answer the questions asked would appear to preclude any suggestion of a denial of natural justice and the reasons for judgement did not address that issue.

=== Corporations power ===
The Court held that the Corporations power did not enable the Parliament to make a valid law controlling the intra-State trading operations of foreign, trading or financial corporations. In giving their reasons, each member of the Court held that the corporations power does not confer on the Commonwealth Parliament power to create corporations. While four of the judges agreed as to the outcome, there was no majority view of the meaning of the corporation power. As all five members of the Court had been leading participants in the Constitutional Conventions and are properly seen as among the framers of the Constitution, these differences of opinion deny that there was then any settled understanding, accepted by these framers of the Constitution, of what meaning or effect was to be given to the corporations power. Three of the judges, Griffith CJ, Barton & O'Connor JJ, relied upon the doctrine of reserved powers, holding that intra-State trading activities were reserved to the States. The importance of the reserved powers doctrine does not however explain all aspects of the differences in opinion about the ambit of the corporations power, in particular the distinction between regulating a corporations relations with outside parties and regulating the internal affairs of a corporation.

Griffith CJ distinguished between a law denying the capacity to enter into a contract with a law governing the validity of a contract, holding that the corporations power does not authorize "the Commonwealth to invade the field of State law as to domestic trade, the carrying on of which is within the capacity of trading and financial corporations formed under the laws of the State." The corporations power permits "the Commonwealth to prohibit a trading or financial corporation formed within the Commonwealth from entering into any field of operation, but does not empower the Commonwealth to control the operations of a corporation which lawfully enters upon a field of operation, the control of which is exclusively reserved to the States."

Barton J held that the corporations power did not "constitute an exception to the otherwise exclusive reservation to the States of the power to deal by legislation with matters within the field of their internal or domestic trade"

O'Connor J held that "the Constitution, whilst empowering the Parliament of the Commonwealth to legislate with respect to foreign corporations and financial and trading corporations formed by the laws of any State, also vests in each State exclusive control over its own purely internal trade and commerce. The corporations power extended "no further than the regulation of the conditions on which corporations of the class described shall be recognised, and permitted to carry on business throughout the Commonwealth" so "as to be consistent as far as possible with the exclusive control over its internal trade and commerce vested in the State."

Higgins J agreed with the majority that sections 5 and 8 of the Act were beyond power, but, having rejected the reserved powers doctrine in his dissent in R v Barger, and the Union Label case, his Honour reasons were significantly different. Higgins J distinguished between the status of corporations and the rights and liabilities attaching to that status, holding that the trade and commerce power and the corporations power were mutually exclusive. In this case the Act was substantially with respect to trade and commerce and thus it could not validly be a law with respect to corporations.

Issacs J had also rejected the reserved powers doctrine in R v Barger, and the Union Label case. His Honour, in dissent, gave a broad meaning to the corporations power but attempted to set limits to the power, in particular holding that the corporations power does not "concern itself with purely internal management, or mere personal preparation to act; it views the beings upon which it is to operate in their relations to outsiders, or, in other words, in the actual exercise of their corporate powers, and entrusts to the Commonwealth Parliament the regulation of the conduct of the corporations in their transactions with or as affecting the public." It would appear, for reasons that are not explained in the judgement, that his Honour saw manufacturing and mining corporations as falling outside the class of trading or financial corporations.

== Aftermath ==
The immediate response was a proposal by the then Acting Prime Minister and Attorney-General, Billy Hughes, to amend the Constitution on the basis that "[t]he National Parliament must have this power of dealing with corporations", a power which "[w]e thought that paragraph xx gave us" The proposal was a single question to amend section 51 of the Constitution to include intrastate trade and commerce, the regulation and control of corporations power and to remove the limitations of conciliation and arbitration and the inter-state requirement. The 1911 referendum was not approved by a majority of voters, and a majority of the voters was achieved in only one state, Western Australia.

In 1913 the Attorney-General tried again. This time the proposals were divided into six different questions, with each question addressing a different power. There was a significant increase in support for all questions, however each question fell just short of a majority of voters, and a majority of the voters was achieved in 3 out of 6 states,

In 1926 the proposal from Prime Minister Bruce was again a compendium of measures, of which the corporations was a part. The proposal was supported by just 44% of voters, and a majority of the voters was achieved in 2 out of 6 states,

Referendum results
Question	NSW	Vic	Qld	SA	WA	Tas	States in favour	Voters in favour	Result
1911 (4) Trade and Commerce	36%	39%	44%	38%	55%	42%	1:5	39%	Not carried
1913 (7) Corporations	47%	49%	54%	51%	53%	45%	3:3	49%	Not carried
1926 (14) Industry and Commerce	52%	36%	52%	29%	29%	45%	2:4	44%	Not carried

The failure of these referendums was followed by co-operation between the states and the Commonwealth in the formation of uniform national companies legislation which passed in each jurisdiction by 1962.

== Significance ==
The reserved powers doctrine that formed the basis of the decision of three judges did not have an enduring legacy. By 1920 each member of the majority had left the court. The reserved powers doctrine was rejected by the High Court in 1920 in the Engineers' case. Given the dubious foundation for the decision, surprisingly the decision itself was not overturned for 60 years.

In the Incorporation case in 1990 the High Court affirmed the view in Huddart, Parker that the corporations power was confined to making laws with respect to companies that had commenced trading and could not be interpreted so as to support laws providing for the formation of companies.

The majority in the WorkChoices case held that the Corporations power permitted law which made the relevant corporations the "object of command" and rejected the proposition that the power should be read down by reference to the Conciliation and Arbitration power, in a manner reminiscent of the discredited doctrine of reserved State powers.

== See also ==
- List of High Court of Australia cases
