= Redfern v Dunlop Rubber Australia Ltd =

- Court: High Court of Australia
- Decided: 25 February 1964
- Citations: [1964] HCA 9, (1964) 110 CLR 194

Court membership
- Judges sitting: Dixon CJ, McTiernan, Kitto, Taylor, Menzies, Windeyer and Owen JJ

Case opinions
- (7:0) Section 4 of the Australian Industries Preservation Act applied to a contract in the restraint of trade which dealt with intrastate and interstate trade. (per Dixon CJ, McTiernan, Kitto, Taylor, Menzies, Windeyer & Owen JJ)

Redfern v Dunlop Rubber Australia Ltd, was a case decided in the High Court of Australia regarding the scope of the trade and commerce power in section 51(i) of the Constitution.

== Background ==
The plaintiffs, Highway Tyre Service, Pakenham Tyre Service, and H.J. King Tyre Service ("Redfern") were three companies engaged in carrying on the business of buying, selling and dealing in motor and cycle tyres and tubes. The defendants consisted of five companies: Dunlop Rubber Australia Limited, B.F. Goodrich Australia Pty. Limited, The Olympic Tyre & Rubber Co. Proprietary Limited, Hardie Rubber Company Pty. Limited, and The Goodyear Tyre & Rubber Co. (Australia) Limited. These companies were all incorporated in the state of Victoria.

The companies entered into a series of contracts between them, which contained terms to the effect of fixing the prices of goods for traders, and the terms on which the goods could be retailed. It was alleged that all of this was done in restraint of, or with intent to restrain, trade and commerce among the States. The plaintiffs claimed that damage resulted from the contracts, arising in their inability to obtain tyres and other goods at wholesale prices and the ability to obtain them only at the prices established under the contracts.

The case involved the Australian Industries Preservation Act, which made it an offence to enter into a contract covering a restraint of trade. The action was commenced in the original jurisdiction of the High Court. The defendants objected to the sufficiency of the claims and the case was referred to the Full Court.

== Decision ==
The issue present was whether the Commonwealth Act could regulate contracts concerning trade and commerce of companies within a single state. The High Court held that the Commonwealth could render the contract void, even if it contained terms that cover purely intrastate trade. This involved a practical consideration where a party could void the involvement of the Commonwealth in regulating trade and commerce by simply inserting an intrastate clause in a contract.

Menzies J stressed the importance of the principle that the Commonwealth's power over trade and commerce extends only to intrastate trade and commerce that is inseparably connected with interstate trade and commerce. Menzies J further noted that this principle was quite consistent with allowing the Commonwealth the power to prohibit or regulate acts that relate to intrastate trade and commerce if they relate to interstate trade and commerce or overseas trade and commerce as well

The High Court hence unanimously adopted Owen J's dissent in Swift Australian Co (Pty) Ltd v Boyd Parkinson, by holding that the Commonwealth was within power to produce legislation covering mixed activities.

== See also ==
- Section 51(i) of the Australian Constitution
- Australian constitutional law
