= Strickland v Rocla Concrete Pipes Ltd =

- Court: High Court of Australia
- Decided: 3 September 1971
- Citations: [1971] HCA 40, (1971) 124 CLR 468

Court membership
- Judges sitting: Barwick CJ, McTiernan, Menzies, Windeyer, Owen, Walsh and Gibbs JJ

Case opinions
- (5:2) The Trade Practices Act 1965 was incapable of being read down to be within Commonwealth legislative power on the basis that s 7, the "reading down" provision, required the Court to legislate rather than read down the law. The Court unanimously agreed that the restrictions placed over Commonwealth power to regulate constitutional corporations in Huddart, Parker & Co Pty Ltd v Moorehead have been overturned, and the Commonwealth may regulate trading activities of trading corporations (per Barwick CJ, McTiernan, Menzies, Windeyer, Owen, Walsh & Gibbs JJ)

Laws applied
- This case overturned a previous ruling
- Huddart, Parker & Co Pty Ltd v Moorehead [1909] HCA 36, (1909) 8 CLR 330

Strickland v Rocla Concrete Pipes Ltd, also known as the Concrete Pipes Case, is a 1971 High Court of Australia case that discusses the scope of the corporations power in section 51(xx) of the Australian Constitution. This was an important case in Australian constitutional law because it overruled the decision in the earlier case of Huddart, Parker & Co Pty Ltd v Moorehead, which held that the corporations power only extended as far as the regulation of their conduct in relation to their transactions with or affecting the public. Since this case, the Commonwealth has had at least the ability to regulate the trading activities of trading corporations, thus opening the way for an expansion in Commonwealth power.

The width of this power was later considered again in the cases of Actors and Announcers Equity Association v Fontana Films, Commonwealth v Tasmania (the Tasmanian Dam Case), Re Dingjan; Ex parte Wagner, and New South Wales v Commonwealth (the WorkChoices Case).

== Background ==
Section 43 of the Trade Practices Act 1965-1969 (Cth) made certain agreements between competitors restricting competition "examinable", and the respondents in this case were charged with breaching that section. The agreements in question were exclusively related to trade in Queensland. Because this is purely intrastate trade, the respondents would not have fallen within the legislative power granted by section 51(i) of the Constitution. The Commonwealth Industrial Court, at first instance, rejected the charge, following Huddart, Parker & Co Pty Ltd v Moorehead, in which it was held that a law with respect to the trading activities of constitutional corporations was not within power.

== Decision ==
=== Corporations power ===
The Court unanimously rejected the decision in Huddart, Parker & Co Pty Ltd v Moorehead, holding that it was based on the rejected doctrine of reserved State powers, which was abolished in Amalgamated Society of Engineers v Adelaide Steamship Co. Ltd.; "the earlier doctrine virtually reversed the Constitution" (per Barwick CJ). The Court found that laws with a sufficient connection to the trading activities of constitutional corporations were valid. In addition, the broader conception of the corporations power, that allows for the regulation of any activities of constitutional corporations, was flagged; "I must not be taken as suggesting that the question whether a particular law is a law within the scope of this power should be approached in any narrow or pedantic manner" (per Barwick CJ).

=== Reading down ===
Barwick CJ also gave guidance as to reading laws with respect to section 15A of the Acts Interpretation Act 1901 (Cth). While he noted that there can be an express intention by the Parliament as to the interpretation of the law, he stated that if it is "single and indivisible", it will not be possible to read down the law and provide it with an alternative interpretation. The coexistence of sections 7 and 35(1) meant that it would have had to apply to both all trade, and to only foreign and interstate trade. However, since section 35(1) is a single provision and not a series of paragraphs, Barwick CJ felt that it would be "legislating and not construing" if it were broken up accordingly.

== See also ==
- Section 51(xx) of the Australian Constitution
- Australian constitutional law
