= O'Sullivan v Noarlunga Meat Ltd (No 2) =

Judgement of the High Court of Australia

- Court: High Court of Australia
- Decided: 13 October 1956
- Citations: [1956] HCA 9, (1956) 94 CLR 367

Case history
- Prior action: O'Sullivan v Noarlunga Meat Ltd (1954) 92 CLR 565
- Subsequent actions: O'Sullivan v Noarlunga Meat Ltd [1956] UKPC 24, [1957] AC 1; [1956] UKPCHCA 4, (1956) 95 CLR 177, Privy Council (on appeal from Australia)

Court membership
- Judges sitting: Dixon CJ, McTiernan, Williams, Webb, Fullagar, Kitto and Taylor JJ

Case opinions
- (7:0) The Court rejected an application to appeal to the Privy Council from the previous case.

O'Sullivan v Noarlunga Meat Ltd (No 2), was a High Court of Australia case, in which a certificate, under s 74 of the Australian Constitution, was sought for leave to appeal to the Privy Council against the previous decision of O'Sullivan v Noarlunga Meat Ltd.

In the preceding case, it was held that the Commonwealth's extensive regulations regarding premises used for the slaughtering of livestock for export were valid under s 51(i) of the Constitution. In June 1955 the Privy Council gave special leave to appeal except to the extent they required a certificate of appeal under section 74. O'Sullivan applied to the High Court for a certificate of appeal.

Dixon CJ, Williams, Webb and Fullagar JJ wrote a joint judgment refusing a certificate of appeal stating that the policy of section 74 was to confine the decision of essentially federal questions to the High Court. McTiernan, Kitto and Taylor JJ each delivered concurring judgments.

The Privy Council took a narrower view of section 74 than the High Court, holding that the question of whether laws were inconsistent involved the application of section 109 of the Constitution and did not involve a question in relation to the constitutional powers of the Commonwealth and the States. The Privy Council dismissed the appeal, approving the earlier decision of the statutory majority of the High Court, particularly the judgment of Fullager J.

== See also ==
- Section 51(i) of the Australian Constitution
- Australian constitutional law
