= Swift Australian Co (Pty) Ltd v Boyd Parkinson =

- Court: High Court of Australia
- Decided: 8 August 1962
- Citations: [1962] HCA 41, (1962) 108 CLR 189

Case history
- Appealed from: Court of Petty Sessions (Qld)

Court membership
- Judges sitting: Dixon CJ, McTiernan, Kitto, Taylor, Menzies, Windeyer and Owen JJ

Case opinions
- (6:1) Regulation 5 of the Customs Act did not cover the regulation of mixed export and domestic meat producers. (per Dixon CJ, McTiernan, Kitto, Taylor, Menzies & Windeyer JJ)

Swift Australian Co (Pty) Ltd v Boyd Parkinson, was a case decided in the High Court of Australia regarding the scope of the trade and commerce power in section 51(i) of the Constitution.

== Background ==
Swift (the appellant) was a company incorporated in Queensland which conducted a business in the meat and meat exporting trade in that state and elsewhere. The company owned a building in Maryborough where it conducted a number of operations including the killing and treatment of poultry. It was registered under the Commonwealth Commerce (Meat Export) Regulations made under the Customs Act 1901. It was registered as an establishment at which a long list of operations was allowed to take place, including the "Slaughtering, chilling, freezing and storage of poultry for export". While Swift was in possession of a Commonwealth licence for the production and export of poultry, it did not have the relevant state licence for the same purpose, as mandated under the Poultry Industry Acts, 1946 to 1959 of the State of Queensland. Swift was subsequently convicted by a Court of Petty Sessions for an offence against such a regulation.

== Decision ==
Swift argued that the Queensland Acts were invalid because they were inconsistent with a Commonwealth Act legislating the same matter. Specifically, the Court had to ascertain whether the Commonwealth Act intended to "cover the field", and include the regulation of all meat exporters.

The critical issue before the Court was the nature of Swift's business, which included the production of meat for both export and domestic consumption. Did the Commonwealth legislation intend to cover the mixed nature of the business? The Court decided in the negative, distinguishing the case from O'Sullivan v Noarlunga Meat Ltd, where all of the meat produced was exported. The High Court held that the Commonwealth did not intend to cover a mixed operation and that the law only covered the export part of the business. Hence, Swift required both a state and a Commonwealth licence.

Owen J dissented, holding the Commonwealth did intend to regulate mixed premises. Owen J argued the Court had to consider whether the trade and commerce power allowed the Commonwealth to legislate in this manner. In order for the Commonwealth to make effective its conditions and regulations in an industry, with an objective procedure for export, then it must have the power to regulate abattoirs where there is a mixed operation.

== See also ==
- Section 51(i) of the Australian Constitution
- Australian constitutional law
