= Reserved powers doctrine =

Defunct principle of Australian law

The reserved powers doctrine was a principle used by the inaugural High Court of Australia in the interpretation of the Constitution of Australia, that emphasised the context of the Constitution, drawing on principles of federalism, what the Court saw as the compact between the newly formed Commonwealth and the former colonies, particularly the compromises that informed the text of the constitution. The doctrine involved a restrictive approach to the interpretation of the specific powers of the Federal Parliament to preserve the powers that were intended to be left to the States. The doctrine was challenged by the new appointments to the Court in 1906 and was ultimately abandoned by the High Court in 1920 in the Engineers' Case, replaced by an approach to interpretation that emphasised the text rather than the context of the Constitution.

== Background ==
The Constitution sets up the Commonwealth of Australia as a federal polity, with enumerated limited specific powers conferred on the Federal Parliament. The constitutional convention held in Adelaide in 1897, passed a resolution that, as the first condition for the creation of a federal government, "the powers, privileges and territories of the several existing colonies shall remain intact, except in respect of such surrenders as may be agreed upon to secure uniformity of law and administration in matters of common concern." The intention of the framers of the Australian Constitution has been said to be "to create a federal government, albeit of limited jurisdiction, which would be responsive to the popular will in specified matters of national concern and to superimpose it upon existing colonial or state governments which were seen as each adequately responsive to the popular will within their respective territorial constituencies."

One of the tasks facing the inaugural High Court was to establish its reputation and in so doing to win the confidence of the Australian people. Another was to resolve "constitutional loose ends" about the nature of the federal system and the legislative powers of the new Commonwealth that remained unresolved following the debates in the constitutional conventions.

For the first two decades, the High Court stayed reasonably true to the "co-ordinate" vision of the framers in which the Commonwealth and the States were both financially and politically independent within their own spheres of responsibility. The High Court rejected Commonwealth government attempts to extend its authority into what were perceived as areas of State jurisdiction. The court did so by adopting a doctrine of "reserved State powers" combined with "implied inter-governmental immunities", to protect both the Commonwealth and the states from legislative or executive action which "would fetter, control, or interfere with, the free exercise" of the legislative or executive power of the other.

The essence of the first part of the doctrine was that grants of power to the Commonwealth in the Constitution should be read in a restrictive way so as to preserve areas that had been intentionally left as the responsibility of the states, particularly where the Commonwealth power had an interstate element, the trade and commerce power, and the conciliation and arbitration power.

=== Composition of the High Court ===
The three inaugural judges of the High Court, Griffith CJ, Barton and O'Connor JJ, and the two new judges appointed in 1906, Isaacs and Higgins JJ, had been leading participants in the Constitutional Conventions and all are properly seen as among the framers of the Constitution. The Court described the Constitution as "framed in Australia by Australians, and for the use of the Australian people", thus when the Court spoke of what was framers of the Constitution knew, intended or expected, their Honours are referring to their personal experience in that process, and not to the intention or knowledge of the Imperial Parliament in passing the Commonwealth of Australia Constitution Act 1900.

- Griffith CJ, a former Premier of Queensland, wrote most of the text of the Constitution. In 1891 Griffith resisted the idea of a commonwealth tribunal to deal with interstate industrial disputes. His objection was grounded in his notion of the reserve powers of the States. According to Griffith, "property and civil rights are left to the States". The danger of Kingston's proposal, as Griffith saw it, was that a national arbitral tribunal could cut across such rights.
- Barton J, a former member of the Parliament of NSW and the first Prime Minister of Australia, had been the leader of Australian federation following the death of Sir Henry Parkes and was the political leader who carried the draft constitution through the 1897–1898 Conventions and had intimate knowledge of the compromises that informed the text of the constitution. Barton resisted the proposal for Commonwealth power in relation to interstate industrial disputes. Barton was part of the delegation to London in 1900 that lobbied for the successful passage of the Bill through the British Parliament.
- O'Connor J was also a former member of the Parliament of NSW and a close associate of Barton, including in the campaign for Australian Federation and as a member of the first federal ministry under then Prime Minister Barton. O'Connor had joined Barton in resisting proposal the proposal of interstate industrial disputes. After Federation he was Vice-President of the Executive Council and led the government in the Senate until his appointment as one of the inaugural justices of the High Court in 1903.
- Isaacs J had been a member of the Parliament of Victoria and had many reservations about the draft constitution. Alfred Deakin attributed the failure to elect him to the committee drafting the constitution to "a plot discreditable to all engaged in it" and that this antagonizing and humiliating snub sharpened his "tendency to minute technical criticism ... so as to bring him not infrequently into collision" with the drafting committee. In March 1898 Isaacs pleaded for delay for further consideration. After federation Isaacs was a member of the Australian Parliament and three of the leading cases in relation to the doctrine concerned legislation drafted while he was Attorney-General. Sir Robert Garran, then secretary of the Attorney-General's Department, recalled that Isaacs "had a remarkably keen brain but it was apt to be sometimes too subtle for my liking. When we were drafting a bill whose constitutionality was not beyond doubt, his devices to conceal any possible want of power were sometimes so ingenious as to raise, rather than evade, suspicion."
- Higgins J had also been a member of the Parliament of Victoria and had successfully argued at the 1897–1898 conventions that the constitution should contain a guarantee of religious freedom, and also a provision giving the federal government the power to make laws relating to the conciliation and arbitration of industrial disputes. The industrial disputes proposal was initially unsuccessful, however Higgins was undeterred and succeeded in 1898. Despite these successes, Higgins J had opposed the draft constitution produced by the convention as too conservative, and campaigned unsuccessfully to have it defeated at the 1899 Australian constitutional referendum. Higgins was also a member of the Australian Parliament. When the Australian Labor Party sought to amend the Conciliation and Arbitration Bill to cover State railway employees, Higgins was one of the radicals who supported the amendments and helped bring down Deakin's government. When Labor formed a minority government under Prime Minister Chris Watson in 1904, Higgins became Attorney-General in the Labor ministry, because Labor had no suitably qualified lawyer in Parliament.

== Developments of the doctrine ==
=== Peterswald v Bartley (1904) ===
Peterswald v Bartley concerned a brewer of beer at Cootamundra in the state of New South Wales. Bartley had a licence under the Commonwealth Beer Excise Act 1901, which involved payment of an annual fee together with duty on the quantity of beer. He didn't however have a licence under the NSW Liquor Act 1898 which required payment of a fixed fee regardless of the brewer's output. Bartley had successfully argued in the Supreme Court of NSW that the NSW licence fee was an excise duty and that the effect of section 90 of the Australian Constitution was that the State Act ceased to have effect once the Commonwealth imposed uniform customs duties.

The High Court held that the NSW licence fee was not an excise as the fee did not depend on the quantity or value of the goods. Instead the NSW Act was for regulating the trade, including ensuring there was no adulteration of the beer. In delivering the opinion of the Court, Griffith CJ set out a principle that would be refined to the reserved state powers doctrine, stating:

In construing a Constitution like this it is necessary to have regard to its general provisions as well as to particular sections, and to ascertain from its whole purview whether the power to deal with such matters was intended to be withdrawn from the States, and conferred upon the Commonwealth. The Constitution contains no provisions for enabling the Commonwealth Parliament to interfere with the private or internal affairs of the States, or to restrict the power of the State to regulate the carrying on of any businesses or trades within their boundaries.

=== Railway servants case (1906) ===
Whether State railways employees should be covered by the Commonwealth Conciliation and Arbitration Bill was a politically contentious issue. When the Australian Labor Party sought to amend the Conciliation and Arbitration Bill to cover State railway employees, a number of radicals in Deakin's government, including Isaacs and Higgins, supported the amendments and helped bring down the government, with Labor forming a minority government under Prime Minister Chris Watson. When finally passed in December 1904, the Commonwealth Conciliation and Arbitration Act 1904, purported to cover State railway employees with "Industrial dispute" defined as "including disputes in relation to employment upon State Railways".

The High Court considered the validity of this provision in the Railway servants case. The NSW Rail Traffic Employees Association was, as the name suggests, a union that represented railway employees of the State of NSW and only those employees and sought to be registered under the Commonwealth Act. Another union, the Federated Amalgamated Government Railway and Tramway Service Association, objected to the registration of the NSW union and the issue was referred to the High Court. Higgins KC who appeared for the respondents, in arguing that the Act was valid, relied not only on the conciliation and arbitration power, but also submitted that railways were vital to interstate trade and commerce and as such was an exercise of the trade and commerce power. Isaacs represented the Commonwealth in his capacity as the then Attorney-General, also arguing for validity based on both the conciliation and arbitration power and the trade and commerce power. NSW and Victoria intervened to argue that the Conciliation and Arbitration Act 1904 was invalid in so far as it purported to include State railway servants.

The High Court held that to regulate the terms and conditions of the engagement, employment and remuneration of the State railway servants was to interfere with the control of the State railways. The Court applied the converse of the "implied inter-governmental immunities" to protect the States from legislative or executive action by the Commonwealth which "would fetter, control, or interfere with, the free exercise" of the legislative or executive power of the States. Griffiths CJ again delivered the judgement of the Court, which again emphasised the federal nature of the Constitution, stating that "The Constitution Act is not only an Act of the Imperial legislature, but it embodies a compact entered into between the six Australian Colonies which formed the Commonwealth. ... the Constitution as framed was to be, and was, submitted to the votes of the electors of the States."

== Expansion of the Court and the emergence of dissent ==
The appointment of Isaacs and Higgins JJ in 1906 disrupted the unanimity of the inaugural members of the Court, with a clash between the three inaugural 'federalists' and the two 'nationalists'. The division in the Court can be seen as a continuation of the debate in the constitutional conventions about the nature of the federal system and the legislative powers of the new Commonwealth.

=== R v Barger (1908) ===
In R v Barger the Court had to consider whether the Commonwealth could use an excise tariff under the taxation power, as a means of protecting manufacturers who paid "fair and reasonable" wages to their employees. The Court was divided 3:2 with the majority, Grifith CJ, Barton & O'Connor JJ, holding that the Excise Tariff Act 1906, was invalid. While the doctrine of reserved powers permeated the decision of the majority it is not clear that the decision rested solely on that doctrine. In the course of argument, Griffith CJ stated "The express power given to the Commonwealth Parliament to deal with foreign and inter-state trade and commerce implies a prohibition against interfering with interstate trade and commerce, and that must be remembered in dealing with the other powers given." The majority described the applicable rule in this case as "different, but ... founded upon the same principles", concluding that the power of taxation could not be exercised so as to operate as a direct interference in the internal affairs of the States.

==== Isaacs & Higgins JJ in dissent ====
Isaacs J strongly opposed the reserved powers doctrine, holding "There can be no derogations from the grant expressly made, except those which are expressly stated or which of necessity inhere. It is an inherent consequence of the division of powers between governmental authorities that neither authority is to hamper or impede the other in the exercise of their respective powers, but that doctrine has no relation to the extent of the powers themselves; it assumes the delimitation aliunde. It is contrary to reason to shorten the expressly granted powers by the undefined residuum".

Higgins J similarly rejected the reserved powers doctrine stating "To say that the Federal Parliament cannot make a law because legislation on the subject belongs to the States is rather to invert the true position. The Commonwealth has certain powers, and as to those powers it is supreme; the State has the rest. We must find what the Commonwealth powers are before we can say what the State powers are".

=== Union Label Case (1908) ===
The Union Label case, concerned the use of union labels to indicate that goods were produced by members of a union. Isaac Isaacs, the then Attorney-General, supported the Trade Marks Bill in parliament, describing the union label as a guarantee of wholesomeness, in respect of the wages, hours of labour, and health requirements that applied to the manufacture of the goods. H.B. Higgins, then a member of the House of Representatives, similarly spoke in support of the union label. The Trade Marks Act 1905 provided that an employer could use the union label if there was a closed shop or if the union agreed.

The majority, Griffiths CJ, Barton and O'Connor JJ held that the power with respect to "trade and commerce with other countries, and among the States" does not extend to the internal trade and commerce of a State. The intention of the Constitution was that the power to legislate as to internal trade and commerce was reserved to the States, to the exclusion of the Commonwealth as if section 51(i) contained words prohibiting the exercise of such powers by the Commonwealth. Isaacs and Higgins JJ dissented however their reasons do not specifically address their continued opposition to the reserved powers doctrine.

=== Huddart Parker v Moorehead (1908) ===
In Huddart, Parker & Co Pty Ltd v Moorehead, the court was considering the Australian Industries Preservation Act 1906, commonly referred to as the Anti-trust law, which was an Act that sought to ensure freedom of trade and commerce, protection from unfair competition and preventing price fixing and monopolies. Sections 5 and 8 of the Act were directed to conduct of foreign, trading or financial corporations, relying on the corporations power. The majority, Griffith CJ, Barton & O'Connor JJ, strongly influenced by the doctrine of reserved State powers, held that the corporations power was to be construed narrowly because the trade and commerce power, did not include intrastate trade and commerce, holding "a more flagrant invasion of the spheres of the domestic law of trade and commerce and the domestic criminal law can hardly be conceived".

The importance of the reserved powers doctrine does not however explain all aspects of the differences in opinion about the ambit of the corporations power, in particular the distinction between regulating a corporations relations with outside parties and regulating the internal affairs of a corporation.

Higgins J agreed with the majority that sections 5 and 8 of the Act were beyond power, but for reasons that were significantly different, with his Honour maintaining his rejection of the reserved powers doctrine in his dissent in R v Barger, and the Union label case. Isaacs J similarly maintained his opposition in respect of the reserved powers doctrine.

=== A challenge to the doctrine – Farey v Burvett (1916) ===
The internal dynamic to the High Court shifted with each retirement of an existing judge and each appointment of a new judge. By 1916 there had been further changes to the composition of the Court, with the death of O'Connor J in 1912, and his replacement by Gavan Duffy J and the expansion of the Court in 1913 with two additional judges, Powers J and Rich J. These changes did not substantially shift the approach of the Court to the interpretation of the Constitution, however there was a gradual shift toward nationalism, coming not just from the changes to the court, but from a growing political centralism, the rise of the Labor party, and nationalism as a consequence of World War I.

In 1916 Farey v Burvett the Court had to consider the validity of legislation and regulations made under the defence power that fixed the maximum price for bread. One of the challenges for Griffith CJ and Barton J was how to accommodate the doctrine of reserved powers. If the Commonwealth Parliament was unable to regulate the brewing industry, conditions for railway employees, manufacturers of agricultural machinery, or unfair competition by corporations, how could the Commonwealth's defence powers extend to directly fix a maximum price for bread?

Griffith CJ held that "The power to make laws with respect to defence is, of course, a paramount power, and if it comes into conflict with any reserved State rights the latter must give way." Barton J distinguished between powers in peace and war, holding that "If an activity belongs solely to a State in time of peace it does not follow that it is not a means of defence for Commonwealth hands in time of war."

Isaacs J, with whom Powers J agreed, doubted that it was permissible to give legal prominence to any one Commonwealth power, even one as necessary as defence, maintaining his previous rejection of the reserved powers doctrine, holding the limits of the defence power "are bounded only by the requirements of self-preservation. It is complete in itself, and there can be no implied reservation of any State power to abridge the express grant of a power to the Commonwealth". His Honour acknowledged that the Commonwealth was entering a legislative area normally outside of its powers, but that this was a legitimate result of the war.

Higgins J similarly maintained his rejection of the reserved powers doctrine, holding that the constitutional question was limited to the interpretation of the express defence power and rejected the suggestion that the defence power was paramount, holding "All the subjects for legislation in sec. 51 are on the same logical level: there is no hierarchy in the powers, with the power as to defence on the top."

Gavan Duffy & Rich JJ in their dissent placed emphasis on the powers of the States, holding that "The enumerated powers entrusted by the States to the Commonwealth are stated in language adopted after prolonged and meticulous discussion. The powers distributed and reserved were intended to enable the individual States and the federation of States to move, each in its own orbit, in a complete and permanent harmony."

== Emphatic rejection ==
More dramatic consequences flowed from the change in the composition of the Court as a result of the retirement of Griffith CJ in 1919, replaced by Knox CJ and the death of Barton J in 1920, and his replacement by Starke J. Within months, the reserved powers doctrine was unambiguously rejected by the High Court, marking the emergence of Isaacs J as the primary force in the Knox Court.

The High Court abandoned the doctrine in the 1920 Engineers' Case after changes in the composition of the Court. The Court now insisted on adhering only to the language of the constitutional text read as a whole in its natural sense and in light of the circumstances in which it was made: there was to be no reading in of implications by reference to the presumed intentions of the framers. In particular, since there is no mention of "reserved State powers," only one express inter-governmental immunity (regarding property taxes: section 114), and, an express provision asserting the superiority of valid Commonwealth laws over inconsistent State laws (section 109), there was no longer any room for the doctrine previously asserted in favour of the States.

== Subsequent consideration ==
In the Payroll Tax case Windeyer J challenged the foundation of the doctrine, that the Constitution was a compact between the former colonies as independent sovereign bodies, holding that:

The Commonwealth Constitution was enacted at Westminster in 1900 as a product of the assent and agreement of the peoples of the Australian Colonies. It was sought by Australians, not imposed upon them. The Constitution Act itself was carefully worded so as not to be coercive. ... As an agreement of peoples, British subjects in British Colonies, and the enactment thereafter by the sovereign legislature of the British Empire of a law to give effect to their wishes, the Australian federation can be described as springing from an agreement or compact. But agreement became merged in law. The word "compact" is still appropriate but strictly only if used in a different sense-not as meaning a pact between independent parties, but as describing a compaction, a putting of separate things firmly together by force of law. The Colonies which in 1901 became States in the new Commonwealth were not before then sovereign bodies in any strict legal sense; and certainly the Constitution did not make them so. They were self-governing colonies which, when the Commonwealth came into existence as a new Dominion of the Crown, lost some of their former powers and gained no new powers. They became components of a federation, the Commonwealth of Australia. It became a nation. Its nationhood was in the course of time to be consolidated in war, by economic and commercial integration. by the unifying influence of federal law, by the decline of dependence upon British naval and military power and by a recognition and acceptance of external interests and obligations.

Despite the emphatic rejection, the States have continued to use the concept in argument against the further expansion of federal power. One of the arguments put forward by the States in the WorkChoices case, was that the powers conferred by s 51 must be construed so that they do not authorise a law with respect to the prevention and settlement of industrial disputes other than by conciliation and arbitration. Victoria submitted that this limitation was based on the text and structure of s 51 and not on any doctrine of reserved powers. Queensland put forward another argument focused on the rejection of attempts to broaden the scope of the corporations power or to confer on the Commonwealth a general industrial relations power in 1910, 1912, 1926 and 1946. Neither argument found favour with the majority, holding that there were three "insuperable difficulties in arguing from the failure of a proposal for constitutional amendment to any conclusion about the Constitution's meaning", (1) the failed referendums were broader than the question the court was asked to determine, (2) the failure of referendums was much more complex than the choice of electors between clearly identified constitutional alternatives & (3) it was unclear whether the referendums were said to confirm or alter the meaning of the Constitution. On the question of reserved powers, the majority noted that "No party to these proceedings questioned the authority of the Engineers' Case, or the Concrete Pipes Case, or the validity of the Trade Practices Act in its application to the domestic (intrastate) trade of constitutional corporations. Necessarily, however, the plaintiffs experienced difficulty in accommodating their submissions to those developments."

Aroney argues that the reserved powers doctrine is often misunderstood and that the description of it in the Engineers case, was a mere caricature of the doctrine. Properly construed the doctrine is said to rest on firmer foundations, being:

1. a clear and defensible account of the political origins, underlying ideas, structural features and intended purposes of the Constitution;
2. a careful articulation of the grounds upon which the specific content of the powers reserved to the states can be identified — one that requires very close attention to be given to the precise terms in which federal heads of power are defined, such that what is not granted to the Commonwealth may be as significant as what is granted; and
3. a sophisticated recognition that constitutional interpretation inevitably requires choices to be made and that these choices can be guided by a general orientation either to expand federal power as far as possible or to read federal power with an eye to the resulting impact on the remaining legislative powers of the states.

== See also ==
- Constitution of Australia
- Constitutional history of Australia
- Australian constitutional law
- Federalism in Australia
