= O'Sullivan v Noarlunga Meat Ltd =

Judgement of the High Court of Australia

- Court: High Court of Australia
- Decided: 16 June 1954
- Citations: [1954] HCA 29, (1954) 92 CLR 565

Case history
- Appealed to: Privy Council [1956] UKPC 24, [1957] AC 1; [1956] UKPCHCA 4, (1956) 95 CLR 177
- Subsequent actions: O'Sullivan v Noarlunga Meat Ltd (No 2) [1956] HCA 9, (1956) 94 CLR 367

Court membership
- Judges sitting: Dixon CJ, McTiernan, Webb, Fullagar, Kitto and Taylor JJ

Case opinions
- (3:3) The Commonwealth licensing system was inconsistent with the state licensing system (per Dixon CJ, Fullagar & Kitto JJ; McTiernan, Webb & Taylor JJ dissenting) (3:3) Section 51(i) of the Constitution permits the Commonwealth to regulate the slaughter of meat for export (per Dixon CJ, Fullagar & Kitto JJ; McTiernan, Webb & Taylor JJ dissenting)

O'Sullivan v Noarlunga Meat Ltd, was a case decided in the High Court of Australia regarding the scope of the trade and commerce power, under s 51(i) of the Australian Constitution, and inconsistency between Commonwealth and State laws, under section 109 of the Constitution.

== Background ==
Noarlunga Meat Ltd was charged with contravening the Metropolitan and Export Abattoirs Act 1936 (SA), s 52a, because it did not hold a State licence for slaughtering stock. All premises outside the metropolitan area "for the purpose of slaughtering stock for export as fresh meat in a chilled or frozen condition" were required to obtain a licence from the State Agriculture Minister. However, the defendant company was registered under the Commerce (Meat Export) Regulations (Cth). Regulation 4B prohibited the exportation of meat unless an export permit had been granted, and regulation 5 required that all premises used for the slaughter of meat to be registered.

The defendant company argued that the State act was invalid by virtue of inconsistency with the Commonwealth regulations, which is dealt with in s 109 of the Constitution.

== Decision ==
=== Trade and commerce power ===
The Commonwealth has the power to make laws with respect to "trade and commerce with other countries, and among the States", as per s 51(i) of the Constitution. This power authorises the prohibition of the export of certain commodities, and by extension the prohibition of commodities with certain restrictions. Regulation 4B is therefore within its power.

Regulation 5 does not fall under the direct head of power. Instead, it falls within the implied incidental power, which was best expressed in D'Emden v Pedder (1904) 1 CLR 91 at p 110. Fullagar J, with whom Dixon CJ and Kitto J concurred, stated that the Commonwealth may control any steps leading to the export itself (generally labelled as "production") that may affect "beneficially or adversely" Australia's export trade. This includes provisions to control the quality of meat being exported, which may involve regulation of such stages as packaging and handling. In fact, it may be necessary to "enter the factory or the field or the mine" to secure Australia's export industry.

In general regulation of production may occur where there is an objectively different method of production between meat destined for home and foreign consumption, but Fullagar J was clear in restricting the application of the principle to the specific factual circumstances at hand.

=== Inconsistency ===
Fullagar J noted that it was possible to obey both sets of laws simultaneously, by acquiring both State and Commonwealth licenses. However, it was his opinion that the regulations expressed an intention to "completely and exhaustively" cover the field with regards to the regulation of such premises; he found the detailed regulations compelling in this regard. Furthermore, the State law would have acted to deny the rights granted by a certificate obtained under the Commonwealth regulations.

The court was split 3-3. As this was a stated case and not an appeal, the decision of the Chief Justice prevailed, in what is sometimes described as a statutory majority.

== Appeal ==
In June 1955 the Privy Council gave special leave to appeal except in relation to the constitutional powers of the Commonwealth and the States. The High Court subsequently refused to issue a certificate under section 74 of the Constitution. The Privy Council held that the question of whether laws were inconsistent involved the application of section 109 of the Constitution and did not involve a question in relation to the constitutional powers of the Commonwealth and the States. The Privy Council approved the decision of the statutory majority, particularly the judgment of Fullagar J and dismissed the appeal.

== See also ==
- Section 51(i) of the Australian Constitution
- Section 109 of the Australian Constitution
- Australian constitutional law
