= Truth About Motorways Pty Ltd v Macquarie Infrastructure Investment Management Ltd =

- Court: High Court of Australia
- Decided: 9 March 2000
- Citations: [2000] HCA 11, (2000) 200 CLR 591
- Transcripts: 1 Sep 1999 [1999] HCATrans 300; 2 Sep 1999 [1999] HCATrans 303

Case history
- Subsequent actions: [2001] FCA 1603, Federal Court

Court membership
- Judges sitting: Gleeson CJ, Gaudron, McHugh, Gummow, Kirby, Hayne and Callinan JJ

Truth About Motorways Pty Ltd v Macquarie Infrastructure Investment Management Ltd, is a landmark Australian judgment of the High Court. The matter related to standing of third parties with no direct involvement.

== Facts ==
The third party, a community group called Truth About Motorways, sought a writ of prohibition against Macquarie Infrastructure Investment Management Ltd to stop the publishing of a prospectus calling for investors in a new toll road proposal in Sydney. The prospectus, claimed Truth About Motorways, was misleading with regard to the number of cars that would use the road and sought an order compelling the publication of corrective advertising. Such action they claimed was misleading contrary to the Trade Practices Act 1974.

== Findings ==
The High Court was asked to determine whether the community group had standing, that is the legal right to bring the legal action.

The High Court of Australia found that a third party could have standing.

- Although it has been suggested that a stranger could only obtain the remedy of prohibition at the discretion of a court (ex debito justitiae) it has never been doubted that, in a proper case, the remedy is available to a stranger, ie a person without standing in the sense of a special or personal interest. (per Kirby J at 162)
- It is not accurate to say that for all classes of proceedings the law required that the moving party have a real, or actual, or special interest in the outcome....an absence of a special interest, or of a particular grievance does not preclude a grant of prohibition or certiorari respectively. A stranger may seek habeas corpus and quo warranto may be granted at the suit of either the Attorney-General ex officio, or any other person. (per Callinan J at 211)

The litigation was ultimately dismissed because the community group was unable to provide security for Macquarie’s legal costs, but the decision is important as it established a very wide standing in matters of the public interest.
