= Section 51(xxvii) of the Constitution of Australia =

Section 51(xxvii) of the Constitution of Australia (the immigration power) grants the Commonwealth Parliament the power to make laws with respect to "immigration and emigration." Historically, it was the principal legislative power in support of Australia's immigration scheme, which is now embodied in the Migration Act 1958 (Cth).

== History ==
The High Court discussed the immigration power in R v Macfarlane; Ex parte O'Flanagan (1923). The plaintiffs were British subjects who had been charged with sedition. While the prosecution was pending, they were summoned to appear before a Board constituted under s 8A of the Immigration Act 1901–1920 (Cth) to show cause why they should not be deported from Australia.

The plaintiffs contended that s 8A was not authorised by s 51(xxvii) of the Constitution on five grounds, three of which concerned the content of the migration power. (The other two grounds concerned federal judicial power and executive power.) The High Court dismissed all five grounds. First, it was established that British subjects were "immigrants" for the purpose of s 51(xxvii). Secondly, the Court extended that proposition to temporary immigrants who did not intend to settle in Australia. Third, the Court adopted an expansive view of the power, holding that because the Parliament "had power to prohibit absolutely the entry into Australia of any person who is an immigrant," it could "prescribe the conditions on which an immigrant may be permitted to enter" (Knox CJ).

Isaacs J (Rich J agreeing) agreed that the power was wide, reciting the history of the White Australia policy from before Federation of Australia to 1923. Starke J also drew on the history of British immigration laws in adopting an expansive view of the power. Higgins J found that the plaintiffs were not entitled to relief for procedural reasons, but expressed doubt as to whether the immigration power should be construed so widely, noting the distinction between a law with respect to immigration and one with respect to immigrants.

== Current application ==
The Migration Reform Act 1992 (Cth) changed the Migration Act so that in terms, it was based on s 51(xix) (the aliens power) rather than the immigration power. The scope of the power has therefore become less significant in contemporary Australian migration law. Although the scope of the power was the subject of submissions in Plaintiff S156 (the PNG solution case), the Court's finding that the law was supported by the Aliens power made it unnecessary to consider the argument that the Migration Act 1958 when it relates to cancelling an Absorbed person visa was not supported by the Immigration power.

== See also ==
- Australian constitutional law
- Section 51 of the Constitution of Australia
- Migration Act 1958
- Immigration to Australia
- Pacific Solution
