= Attorney-General for NSW v Brewery Employees Union of NSW =

Judgement of the High Court of Australia

Attorney-General (NSW) v Brewery Employees Union of NSW (Union Label case)
- Court: High Court of Australia
- Full case name: Attorney-General (NSW) ex rel. Tooth & Co Ltd and ors v Brewery Employees' Union of NSW
- Decided: 8 August 1908
- Citations: [1908] HCA 94, (1908) 6 CLR 469

Court membership
- Judges sitting: Griffith CJ, Barton, O'Connor, Isaacs and Higgins JJ

Attorney-General (NSW) v Brewery Employees Union of NSW, commonly known as the Union Label case, was a landmark decision by the High Court of Australia on 8 August 1908. The case was significant in relation to the endorsement by the majority of the court of the reserved powers doctrine and as the first case to consider the scope of the power of the Commonwealth regarding trade marks. It also addressed who could challenge a law as unconstitutional. There was a strong division in the Court between the original members, Griffith CJ, Barton and O'Connor JJ and the two newly appointed justices, Isaacs and Higgins JJ.

== Background ==
The case concerned the use of union labels to indicate that goods were produced by members of a union. Isaac Isaacs, the then Attorney-General, supported the Trade Marks Bill in parliament, describing the union label as a guarantee of wholesomeness, in respect of the wages, hours of labour, and health requirements that applied to the manufacture of the goods. H.B. Higgins, then a member of the House of Representatives, similarly spoke in support of the union label. The Trade Marks Act 1905 provided that an employer could use the union label if there was a closed shop or if the union agreed.

The Brewery Employees Union of NSW registered a union label as a trade mark. The Attorney-General (NSW) commenced proceedings in the High Court on behalf of four brewing companies in NSW: Tooth & Co., Toohey and Co., the Maitland Brewing Company, (Note: The Maitland Brewing Company was acquired by Tooth & Co in 1913, "Maitland Brewing Co". The Sunday Times. 2 November 1913. p. 2 – via National Library of Australia.) and the Castlemaine Brewery and Wood Brothers Company. (Note: The Castlemaine Brewery and Wood Brothers Company was unrelated to the brewery company that became Castlemaine Perkins or the Castlemaine Brewery, WA. The company was acquired by Tooth & Co in 1921 "Tooth-Castlemaine Wood". The Sydney Morning Herald. 18 February 1921. p. 8 – via National Library of Australia..) The brewing companies argued that some people would stop buying their beer if the union label was used and other people would stop buying their beer if the union label was not used and that union label would make it difficult for them to employ workmen who were not members of the union.

The case considered three issues:

- Who had standing to argue that an Act of the Commonwealth Parliament was invalid under the constitution;
- Whether the Commonwealth power on Trade Marks was limited by an implication that the Constitution "reserved" power over intrastate commerce to the States; and
- Whether a union label was a trade mark within the meaning of the Constitution.

== Decision ==
Each member of the Court held that the Court would not decide a constitutional question unless it was necessary to do so. The majority, Griffiths CJ, Barton and O'Connor JJ held that Attorney-General for a State had standing to commence proceedings in relation to the constitution and that part of the Trade Marks Act 1905 was invalid, both because of the reserved powers doctrine and because the union label was not a trade mark within the meaning of the Constitution. Isaacs J agreed that the Attorney-General had standing to commence the proceedings, but dissented on the basis that the union label was a trade mark and that the trade marks power was not limited by the doctrine of reserved powers. Higgins J dissented on each ground, holding that the Attorney-General did not have standing, that the union label was a trade mark and that the trade marks power was not limited by the doctrine of reserved powers.

=== Standing ===
The majority, Griffiths CJ, Barton, O'Connor and Isaacs JJ settled the question that the Attorney-General of a State can maintain an action against the Commonwealth to obtain a declaration and consequential relief against the Commonwealth's ultra vires activity.

Griffiths CJ held that:

The first condition of any litigation in a Court of Justice is that there should be a competent plaintiff, i.e., a person who has a direct material interest in the determination of the question sought to be decided. The Court will not decide abstract questions, nor will it decide any question except when raised by some person entitled by reason of his interest to claim a decision.

O'Connor J gave a wider consideration to the role of the several Attorneys-General of the States and of the Commonwealth, holding that the Attorney-General represented not just the State as a legal entity but the people of that State generally:

In a unitary form of government, as there is only one community and one public which the Attorney-General represents, the question which has now been raised cannot arise. It is impossible, therefore, that there can be any decision either in England or in any of the Australian Colonies before Federation exactly in point. But it seems to me that in the working out of the federal system established by the Australian Constitution an extension of the principle is essential.

=== Reserved powers ===
The majority, Griffiths CJ, Barton and O'Connor JJ held that the power with respect to "trade and commerce with other countries, and among the States", does not extend to the internal trade and commerce of a State. The intention of the Constitution was that the power to legislate as to internal trade and commerce was reserved to the States, to the exclusion of the Commonwealth as if section 51(i) contained words prohibiting the exercise of such powers by the Commonwealth.

=== Meaning of trade mark ===
The majority held that a union label was not a trade mark within the meaning of the Constitution in that the constitutional term should be of the technical meaning that it had held in 1900.

Griffith CJ said that in 1900 trade marks did not have a signification that embraced union labels in that the a union label did not distinguish the goods made by any particular person or persons from goods manufactured by other persons.

Barton J held that a trade mark was

A mark which is placed on goods (1) to distinguish them as the goods of the person who uses the mark; (2) exercising dominion over the goods, whether he has absolute ownership or only a contractual right to the possession; (3) in the course of his trade; and (4) exercising a right to the exclusive use of the mark.

O'Connor J held that there were two essential elements of a trade mark, (1) that the proprietor of a trade mark must have some trade or business connection with the goods and (2) the mark must be capable of distinguishing the particular goods from other goods of a like character. The union had no business connection with the goods to which the union label was to be affixed and the mark made no distinction as to the manufacture of the goods.

Higgins J held that "The usage in 1900 [of the term trade marks] gives us the central type [of legislative power conferred]; it does not give us the circumference of the power. To find the circumference of the power, we take as a centre the thing named—trade marks—with the meaning as in 1900; but it is a mistake to treat the centre as the radius." Higgins J also held that

... although we are to interpret the words of the Constitution on the same principles of interpretation as we apply to any ordinary law, these very principles of interpretation compel us to take into account the nature and scope of the Act that we are interpreting – to remember that it is a Constitution, a mechanism under which laws are to be made, and not a mere Act which declares what the law is to be.

== Subsequent consideration ==
The decision as to the competence of the Attorney-General of a State to sue the Commonwealth to protect the public from the operation of an invalid federal law was the basis for the development of the modern constitutional doctrine of standing.

The decision continues to be cited as authority for the long settled practice of the High Court to decline to answer unnecessary constitutional questions.

The reserved powers doctrine did not have an enduring legacy. By 1920 each member of the majority had left the court. (Note: O'Connor J died in 1912, Griffith CJ retired in 1919 and Barton J died in 1920.) The reserved powers doctrine was rejected by the High Court in the landmark Engineers' case in 1920.

For over three-quarters of a century the Union Label case remained the only decision of the High Court which directly addressed the validity of a law said to have been made under section 51(xviii). However, the narrow approach adopted in that case to the concept of a trade mark was not reflected in decisions of the High Court in the latter part of the 20th century.

== See also ==
- List of High Court of Australia cases
