= Section 51(xxxvii) of the Constitution of Australia =

Section 51(xxxvii) of the Constitution of Australia (also called the referral power) is a provision in the Australian Constitution which empowers the Australian Parliament to legislate on matters referred to it by any state. As Australia is a federation, both states and the Commonwealth have legislative power, and the Australian Constitution limits Commonwealth power (see Section 51 and Section 52). Section 51(xxxvii) allows for a degree of flexibility in the allocation of legislative powers.

In practice, the referral power has been quite important in allowing the Commonwealth to enact legislation.

== Uncertainty Regarding the Scope of Section 51(xxxvii) ==
Section 51(xxxvii) grants power regarding:

matters referred to the Parliament of the Commonwealth by the Parliament or Parliaments of any State or States, but so that the law shall extend only to States by whose Parliaments the matter is referred, or which afterwards adopt the law.

Uncertain issues concern:

- Revocability: whether a State can revoke a referral or if it has the status of a quasi-amendment to Section 51.
- Exclusivity: whether a referral grants exclusive Commonwealth power or concurrent power. That is, whether the states may continue to legislate on fields referred to the Commonwealth.

== Limitation of conferred power ==
Chief Justice French of the High Court of Australia in a speech on the Australian constitution commented:

At the outset it may be observed that the power is not, in express terms, a power to refer matters. It is a power conferred upon the parliament of the Commonwealth to make new laws with respect to matters referred. This has the important consequence that the laws so made are federal laws. Federal laws must be uniform throughout the commonwealth and these laws only apply to certain States. These new laws made are more correctly State/Federal laws that can only be applied within a State and strictly speaking a State court exercising State/Federal jurisdiction. The legislative power conferred by section 51(xxxvii) is subject to the Constitution. A question has been raised in academic commentary about whether a law adopted by a State parliament pursuant to section 51(xxxvii) is also a Commonwealth law. The power conferred by section 51(xxxvii) is qualified so as to limit the operation of a law made under it to the referring States and to any States adopting that law.

Justice Kirby commenting on the case of Thomas v Mowbray in regard to States referring anti terrorism laws justified a narrow reading of the referral due to the 'principle of legality' -

Commonwealth power acquired through state references is ultimately power derived in such distinctive circumstances that a suitably different approach to its reading must necessarily follow. That approach must be to always interpret referrals strictly rather than expansively even if this runs counter to how the scope of Commonwealth power is normally viewed by the court and even if doing so inconveniences efforts at co-operative federalism.

The interpretative presumption that legislation is not intended to curtail common law rights or contravene international human rights standards.

There was ambivalence on these issues within the constitutional convention itself. The issue of revocability has not been clarified today. This explains why referrals of power are usually very narrow. Referrals usually include in their terms an expiry period, after which a further referral is required. Limitations of time were upheld as valid by the High Court in 1964, although the general issue of revocability was not resolved. Uncertainty may lead to the use instead of mirror legislation (see below), in which the states retain their legislative power.

The issue of exclusivity seems to have been resolved in favour of the concurrent legislative power approach. That is, as with other powers in section 51, states can continue to legislate subject to inconsistency with Commonwealth legislation (Constitution s 109).

== Examples of the use of Section 51(xxxvii) ==
This list is not comprehensive. Rather, this article intends to highlight some significant examples of referral of powers and demonstrate how and why the power is used.

=== De facto relationships ===
The Australian Constitution confers legislative power to the Commonwealth over marriage (Section 51(xxi)) and matrimonial causes (Section 51xxii)). The Australian Commonwealth created the Family Court of Australia as a specialist court dealing with divorce, including custody of children. However, the custody of children born outside of a marriage was outside of the Commonwealth's jurisdiction. As a result, these matters had to be litigated in non-specialist state courts.

Between 1986 and 1990 all states, except for Western Australia, referred the custody, maintenance, and access of ex-nuptial children to the Commonwealth. This referral excluded child welfare matters. Given that abuse of children is frequently a matter of contention in family law cases that reach litigation, this limitation is important in that it establishes a split system and creates bureaucratic hurdles. The referral also did not refer to property matters arising at the end of de facto relationships. As a result, maintenance orders are made in the Family Court and property settlements in state courts, although the matters may be inter-related. In 2003 Victoria, Queensland, and New South Wales referred financial settlements to the Commonwealth. However, the issue remains unresolved in relation to other states.

Western Australia has not referred powers, and has its own specialist court, the Family Court of Western Australia.

=== Limited jurisdiction over de facto relationships since 1 March 2009 ===
From 1 March 2009 a new section in the Family Law Act 1975 has limited jurisdiction over de facto relationships that have a geographical connection with a participating State, sections 90RG, 90SD and 90SK of the Family Law Act. Participating States and territories are: New South Wales, Victoria, Queensland, South Australia, Tasmania, the Australian Capital Territory, the Northern Territory, Norfolk Island, Christmas Island or the Cocos (Keeling) Islands. These States referred de facto matters under section 51(xxxvii) of the Constitution of Australia.

=== Difference in referral of power over marriage and de facto ===
The Commonwealth power to legislate for marriage and 'matrimonial causes' is supported by paragraphs 51(xxi) and (xxii) of the Constitution, whereas the power to legislate for de facto financial matters relies on referrals by States to the Commonwealth in accordance with paragraph 51(xxxvii) of the Constitution. A special cause was created called a 'de facto financial cause' see the Family Law Amendment (De Facto Financial Matters and Other Measures) Bill 2008 Explanatory Memorandum

However, the definitions of 'matrimonial cause' and 'de facto financial cause' differ in some respects, due to the different sources of Commonwealth power to legislate for these matters. Paragraphs (a) to (d) of the definition of 'de facto financial cause', in the Family Law Act 1975 therefore, limit the proceedings within each of those paragraphs to proceedings taken once the relevant de facto relationship has broken down.

=== No jurisdiction over de facto relationships outside Australia ===
Unlike a marriage which has a recognised legal status in the Constitution and is also internationally recognised, the legal status of a de facto relationship and a 'de facto financial cause' can only be applied within a participating State due to the limitations of section 51 (xxxvii) where it states the law shall extend only to States by whose Parliaments the matter is referred, or which afterward adopt the law.

To explain further, the unmarried couple do not take the State with them when they move out of the State and the de facto legal status cannot exist outside of a participating State. Thus, the unmarried couple's relationship is then covered by the laws on unmarried relationships of that country where they are ordinarily resident. To interpret the legislation otherwise would be to override the Australian constitution due to limitations on how the power was derived from State power and the international human rights on the right for self-determination and to choose status, see Articles 1 and 2 International Covenant on Civil and Political Rights.

=== Corporations ===
The corporations power, Constitution s 51(xx), empowers the Commonwealth to legislate with respect to "foreign corporations, and trading or financial corporations formed within the limits of the Commonwealth". On the basis of this power, in 1989 the Commonwealth enacted comprehensive legislation on corporations in Australia, the Corporations Act 1989 (Cth).

The Act covered not only corporations already in existence but also processes of incorporation. Having different sets of rules in each jurisdiction for the establishment of companies, and different registers for the existence of companies, created red-tape and legal hurdles for business. However, in the Incorporation Case (1990), the High Court held that "formed" related to corporations only after their creation and so did not support legislation prescribing incorporation processes. To that extent, the act was invalid.

The Commonwealth then obtained power to legislate with respect to incorporation processes by persuading the states to refer their powers over incorporation processes to the Commonwealth. The current Corporations Act 2001 (Cth) is supported by the combination of the corporations power with this referral of power. The referral also allowed the passage of the Australian Securities & Investments Commission Act 2001 (Cth).

=== Industrial relations - Victoria ===
In 1996 Victoria referred certain industrial relations matters to the Commonwealth, in the Commonwealth Powers (Industrial Relations Act) 1996 (Vic). This allowed Commonwealth industrial relations law, the Workplace Relations Act 1996, to apply to Victorian industrial relations. The Workplace Relations Act would otherwise have been limited in operation by Section 51(xx) of the Constitution of Australia (the corporations power) and Section 51(xxxv) of the Constitution of Australia (the conciliation and arbitration power). No other state followed Victoria's lead and the question of referral mostly disappeared with the establishment of a largely national regime of workplace relations through the Workplace Relations Amendment (Work Choices) Act 2005 (Cth).

=== Terrorism ===
Although Section 51(vi) of the Constitution of Australia (the defence power) empowers the Commonwealth to legislate on military matters, it is considered unlikely that this power extends to the making of laws relating to internal security.

In 2002–2003, all states referred a limited power to allow the enactment of the Criminal Code Amendment (Terrorism) Act 2003 (Cth). The referral required that the act not be amended without consultation with the states.

=== Consumer credit ===
In 2009, the National Consumer Credit Protection Act (Cth) transfers regulatory responsibility for credit from the states and territories to the Commonwealth. This is a wide-reaching reform of the regulation of the consumer credit in Australia. Previously, consumer credit was regulated at state level amongst each of the states but it was agreed at a COAG meeting that this area of the law should be reformed as a result of the 2008 financial crisis and on a constitutional level, this was made possible because of the referral power.

=== Mutual recognition ===
In 1992, the Mutual Recognition Act 1992 was enacted and it allowed for mutual recognition between the various states of certain goods and occupations. It allowed people with certain occupations (e.g. nurse, physician, teacher) to work that occupation in another state with minimal delay or fuss. Likewise, most goods that meet the standards of the state they originated from can be sold in any other state regardless of the specific standards of that state.

== Alternatives to Section 51(xxxvii) when the Commonwealth Lacks Power ==
=== Mirror Legislation ===
The referral power in section 51(xxxvii) should not be confused with the practice of 'mirror legislation'. Mirror legislation occurs when state parliaments enact identical legislation to achieve consistency across the states. Such legislation may be led by the Commonwealth, perhaps through framework legislation of its own. Nonetheless, the mirror legislation itself is state legislation, based on state powers. Mirror legislation may be preferred by the states as it gives them control over subsequent repeal and amendment. However, this can introduce inconsistencies when different amendments are subsequently made in different jurisdictions.

=== Tied Grants ===
A 'tied grant' is when the Commonwealth dictates state policy direction by granting funding to the states under section 96 of the constitution subject to the 'terms and conditions' that a certain policy be implemented. As with mirror legislation, the enacting legislation is state legislation and based on state legislative power, although the grant is made by the Commonwealth.

Tied grants have often been 'forced' upon states due to the vertical fiscal imbalance between states and the Commonwealth. By contrast, the areas where s51(xxxvii) have been used generally reflect a consensus that differing state systems are undesirable.
