= New South Wales v Commonwealth (2006) =

Judgement of the High Court of Australia

- Court: High Court of Australia
- Full case name: New South Wales & Ors v Commonwealth
- Decided: 14 November 2006
- Citations: [2006] HCA 52, 229 CLR 1
- Transcripts: Day 1 [2006] HCATrans 215; Day 2 [2006] HCATrans 216; Day 3 [2006] HCATrans 217; Day 4 [2006] HCATrans 218; Day 5 [2006] HCATrans 233; Day 6 [2006] HCATrans 235

Court membership
- Judges sitting: Gleeson CJ, Gummow, Kirby, Hayne, Callinan, Heydon & Crennan JJ

Case opinions
- Decision by: Gleeson CJ, Gummow, Hayne, Heydon and Crennan JJ (par. 1–422)
- Dissent: Kirby J (par. 423–616) and Callinan J (par. 617–914)

Keywords
- WorkChoices; Australian constitutional law; corporations power; conciliation and arbitration power

New South Wales v Commonwealth (also called the WorkChoices case) is a landmark decision of the High Court of Australia, which held that the federal government's WorkChoices legislation was a valid exercise of federal legislative power under the Constitution of Australia. In essence, the majority (Gleeson CJ, Gummow, Hayne, Heydon & Crennan JJ) found the Constitution's corporations power capable of sustaining the legislative framework, while the conciliation and arbitration and territories powers were also seen as supporting parts of the law. Furthermore, the majority also held that the legislation permissibly limited State powers and did not interfere with State constitutions or functioning. A minority (Kirby and Callinan JJ) dissented.

The case attracted considerable attention before, during and after the High Court decision was delivered on 14 November 2006. As a legal precedent, it may signify a shift in the distribution of power from the States to the Federal Parliament. Thus, the decision could well be regarded by historians of Australian federalism as an important legal landmark.

== Background to the case ==
From at least 1904 through to the last decade of the 20th century, the constitutional basis of most Australian federal industrial relations legislation was the conciliation and arbitration power. In general, the Federal Parliament would exercise this power to establish an independent tribunal to set minimum terms and conditions of employment by the compulsory conciliation and arbitration of interstate industrial disputes.

Another important historical fact of note is that for much of the 20th century, the States and Territories had their own workplace relations legislation setting terms and conditions for employees not affected by the arbitration of interstate industrial disputes.

=== WorkChoices legislation ===
In December 2005, the WorkChoices legislation was passed by Federal Parliament. There were many elements in the reforms, including some which elicited political and social controversy and consternation. In a legal sense, perhaps the two most fundamental changes were (1) the purported elimination of State and Territory workplace relations legislation from the federal industrial landscape and (2) the attempt to rely almost completely on the corporations power directly to prescribe minimum terms and conditions of employment regardless of the existence of an intrastate industrial dispute. This unprecedented (but not novel) use of the corporations power to enact federal industrial legislation was accompanied by claims that 85% of the Australian workforce would be covered by WorkChoices.

A legal challenge to the constitutional basis of WorkChoices followed in short order. The plaintiffs were States of New South Wales, Western Australia, South Australia, Queensland, Victoria, and the Australian Workers' Union and Unions New South Wales. The defendant was the Commonwealth of Australia. Attorneys-General for the State of Tasmania, the Northern Territory and the Australian Capital Territory intervened in support of the plaintiffs. The Full Court of the High Court hearing the case comprised Gleeson CJ, Gummow, Kirby, Hayne, Callinan, Heydon and Crennan JJ.

Hearings of substantial matters began on 4 May 2006, and concluded on 11 May. The outcome of the challenge was the High Court decision of New South Wales & Ors v Commonwealth, delivered on 14 November 2006.

== Legal contentions ==
=== Commonwealth ===
The Commonwealth argued the WorkChoices legislation was constitutionally valid. It said the corporations power supported any law that directly created, altered, or impaired the rights, powers, duties, liabilities or privileges of a corporation. Furthermore, it was said that the power was validly exercised by any law:

- relating to the conduct of those who work for corporations
- relating to the business functions, activities or relationships of corporations
- protecting corporations from loss or damage, and
- otherwise materially affecting a corporation.

The principal argument of the Government of Australia is that the legislation is supported by Section 51(xx) of the Commonwealth of Australia Constitution Act 1901, commonly known as "the corporations power", which gives the Parliament of Australia the power to make laws with respect to "foreign corporations, and trading or financial corporations formed within the limits of the Commonwealth."

Some sections of the legislation are also based on other powers in the Constitution, for example the territories power, insofar as the laws apply to territories, and sections relating to employees of the Government of Australia. Generally speaking, those sections were not challenged by the states and the unions.

=== States and unions ===
Shortly put, the plaintiffs argued the WorkChoices legislation was constitutionally invalid. They said that the corporations power did not support the legislative framework. In this regard, the plaintiffs argued there were three alternative limitations on the corporations power:

- it was limited to regulation of corporations' external relationships, and/or
- it was limited to laws in which the nature of the corporation was significant, and/or
- it was limited by the existence of the conciliation and arbitration power.

The states and trade unions involved in the case divided the issues between themselves, with the lawyers for each party arguing a particular part of the overall argument.

The challengers argued that the legislation was not a valid law under the Constitution of the Australian Commonwealth Act 1901, because it is not supported by any of the heads of power granted to the Parliament of Australia by Section 51 of the Constitution of the Australian Commonwealth Act 1901. Their principal argument was that the corporations power did not extend far enough to support the legislation.

They distinguished the WorkChoices legislation from other laws which rely on the corporations power (such as the Trade Practices Act 1974) on the basis that those other laws are "manifestly laws with respect to... corporations" because they have "a structure whereby the corporation is a relevant actor and the activities in question are to be in trade or commerce." That is, those other laws were aimed directly at corporations, and more specifically at their trading and commercial activities. They argued that the WorkChoices legislation was really directed at industrial relations, and was only remotely connected with corporations.

The challengers argued that the limits of the corporations power had not really been tested, since the vast majority of the case law was focused on determining to which corporations the power applies.

The states also argued that since the time of Federation, the industrial relations system in Australia had been largely state run. The Commonwealth's conciliation and arbitration power is specifically limited to interstate disputes, and does not extend to disputes existing entirely within one state.

== The judgment ==
The Court ruled 5:2 in favour of the Commonwealth (Gleeson CJ, Gummow, Hayne, Heydon and Crennan JJ; Kirby and Callinan JJ dissenting).

=== Majority judgment ===
The majority of the High Court :

- rejected the plaintiffs' argument that the corporations power was limited to external relationships. Their Honours said it was inappropriate and unhelpful to draw any distinction between external and internal relationships of a corporation.
- did not expressly accept the plaintiffs' argument that the nature of the corporation had to be a significant element in the law. Their Honours said that the corporations power was validly exercised if a law prescribed norms regulating the relationship between corporations and their employees.
- rejected the plaintiffs' argument that the corporations power had to be limited by the existence of the conciliation and arbitration power. Their Honours said, amongst other things, this contention was contrary to the Constitution's text and structure and High Court precedent since 1920.

Their Honours also rejected other arguments of the plaintiffs that parts of the WorkChoices legislation

- which covered employers in Territories were an invalid exercise of the Territories power
- which removed State and Territory industrial laws from the new federal workplace relations system were an invalid exercise of the corporations power or curtailed or interfered with the capacity of States to function

The majority declared:

A law which prescribes norms regulating the relationship between constitutional corporations and their employees, or affecting constitutional corporations in the manner considered and upheld in Fontana Films or, as Gaudron J said in Re Pacific Coal, "laws prescribing the industrial rights and obligations of [constitutional] corporations and their employees and the means by which they are to conduct their industrial relations" are laws with respect to constitutional corporations.

=== Kirby J (dissenting) ===
The significant ideas put forward by Kirby J include:

- At paragraph 481-3: it is unnecessary for this case to outline or define the scope of the corporations power. The corporations power is restricted in relation to laws regarding industrial disputes by s51(xxxv). What is forbidden is basing a law on one head of power (i.e. corporations power) when it is clearly a law with respect to another head of power (i.e. industrial disputes);
- At paragraph 607: laws with respect to industrial disputes must fit within the two safeguards in s51(xxxv) namely interstateness and independent resolution;
- At paragraph 609 (titled Preserving Industrial Fairness): the idea of a fair go that was at the heart of federal workplace laws is destroyed which has the potential to affect the core values that shaped the Australian Community and Economy; and
- At paragraph 613: the high court should be attentive to the federal character of the Constitution.

=== Callinan J (dissenting) ===
Callinan J summarises his judgment at paragraph 913. Generally, the reasons set down in paragraph 913 include:

- The Constitution should be read as a whole;
- The substance of the legislation in question is with regards to industrial affairs;
- The industrial affairs power includes the two safe guards;
- As much as the corporations power may purport to support the legislation, the power is still subject to the restrictions of the industrial affairs power for industrial affairs legislation;
- To affirm the validity of the Act would be to trespass on the functions of the states; and
- The validation of the Act would result in an unacceptable distortion of the federal balance.

== Significance and controversy ==
Media coverage and commentary on the case has been significant. The case has been "hailed as the most important constitutional case in 80 years" (a probable reference to Engineers, heard 86 years prior). It has also been described as potentially one of the most important cases in the history of the Court.

The case is also significant because of the politics surrounding it. Underpinning the challenge is a major political rift in Australian politics between the two major political forces: the Australian Labor Party (ALP) and the Liberal/National Coalition.

In 2006 not only did the Coalition hold the Federal Government of Australia but they also held a majority in the Senate allowing them to completely dominate the Federal Parliament. Federal Labor's poor result at the 2004 federal election provided the Coalition with control of the Senate for the first time since 1980. This gave the Coalition complete Federal legislative freedom. Conversely, Labor governments have been elected in all six states and two territories.

The Workplace Relations WorkChoices Act is itself politically contentious and perceived by some as an attack on both the Union and Labor movements, and the minimum wage setting system as a whole. The Coalition (inspired by conservative think tank the H. R. Nicholls Society) believe the step to have "bravely taken advantage of...new found legislative freedom and have created a substantially different and national industrial relations system". The ALP have been aggressive critics of the new laws. On the day the Bill was introduced into the Australian House of Representatives 11 members of the ALP were ejected during heated debate over the Bill. In this context the creation of "one national system" is seen by some as a sensible step to modernise Australia's industrial relations regime. Others see it as a coup d'état of the Labor Party's power to create union friendly legislative regimes through their respective State Parliaments.

The political (and party political) dimension has led commentators to draw comparisons between this case and two others: the Bank Nationalisation Case and the Communist Party Case, because in those cases the High Court was the final arbiter of divisive political issues.

The Case is also significant in that it had the most lawyers to ever appear in the High Court at one time (39), outstripping Wik Peoples v Queensland for the title. A picture of the proceedings has been placed on the High Court of Australia's website for this reason.

Queensland Premier Peter Beattie has said that if the Commonwealth were successful in the case, it would pave the way for the Commonwealth to use the corporations head of power to move into other areas of law traditionally within the purview of the States, such as transport, education and health. He has stated that this "would leave the federation in confusion" and has suggested that a Constitutional Convention would be necessary if that situation arose.

== See also ==
- Australian constitutional law
- Australian labour law
