= Ian Callinan =

Former Justice of the High Court of Australia

The Honourable Ian Callinan AC

Justice of the High Court of Australia
- In office 3 February 1998 – 31 August 2007
- Nominated by: John Howard
- Appointed by: William Deane
- Preceded by: John Toohey
- Succeeded by: Susan Kiefel

Personal details
- Born: Ian David Francis Callinan; 1 September 1937 (age 89) Casino, New South Wales

Ian David Francis Callinan (born 1 September 1937) is a former Justice of the High Court of Australia, the highest court in the Australian court hierarchy.

== Education ==
Born in Casino, New South Wales, Callinan was raised in Brisbane, Queensland, and educated at Brisbane Grammar School. He received a Bachelor of Laws from the University of Queensland while working as an articled clerk. On 23 July 2010, the University of Queensland awarded him a Doctorate of Laws (honoris causa) in recognition of his service to the law and the arts. In 2012, James Cook University awarded Callinan an Honorary Doctorate in Laws (honoris causa) in recognition of his service to the law.

== Pre-judicial career ==
Callinan was admitted as a solicitor of the Supreme Court of Queensland in 1960 and a barrister in 1965. He was appointed as a Queen's Counsel (QC) in 1978. He was President of the Queensland Bar Association between 1984 and 1987 and President of the Australian Bar Association between 1984 and 1985.

At the Bar he developed a broad national practice, appearing in cases concerning almost all areas of the law, including high-profile commercial law cases, industrial relations disputes, defamation trials, constitutional cases and criminal matters. He was briefed by the Commonwealth Director of Public Prosecutions to prosecute a sitting High Court justice, Lionel Murphy, to appear in extradition proceedings against fugitive businessman Christopher Skase in both Spanish and Australian courts, and to prosecute the first "bottom of the harbour" tax fraud case, which was appealed to the High Court.

He also appeared for high-profile corporate and sporting personalities such as Alan Bond, Greg Chappell and Andrew Ettingshausen. While at the Bar he held retainers from some of Australia's largest banks and media companies.

He advised the then Deputy Premier of Queensland, Bill Gunn to establish an inquiry into police corruption following the broadcast on the Australian Broadcasting Corporation's (ABC) Four Corners program of a report entitled "The Moonlight State" which detailed extensive police corruption. He subsequently appeared for the Queensland Government in the Commission of Inquiry into Possible Illegal Activities and Associated Police Misconduct, more usually known as the Fitzgerald Inquiry.

Callinan was particularly noted for his work in defamation cases. He successfully defended what was then the longest civil jury trial in Australian legal history, when he appeared as leading counsel for Channel 9 in a 13-week defamation trial, in which Sir Leslie Thiess sought damages from Channel 9 following a report broadcast on that network that he had bribed the Premier of Queensland, Joh Bjelke-Petersen.

== Judicial activity ==
Callinan was appointed as a Justice of the High Court in February 1998. He remained a Justice of the High Court until 1 September 2007, when he was compelled to retire under the Commonwealth of Australia Constitution Act 1901 (Cth) s 72 provision which requires all Federal judges to retire upon attaining the age of 70. He was replaced by fellow Queenslander Susan Kiefel.

He is considered a strong defender of federalism. His judgments show a willingness to innovate in common law areas (for example in, tort and contract law cases), but a strong reluctance to depart from the original intent of the Constitution.

In constitutional cases Callinan expressed a clear preference for a restrained interpretation of the Constitution and for significant developments to be by way of referendum rather than judicial decision. That view was most trenchantly expressed in his lengthy dissent in New South Wales v Commonwealth, a case concerned with the constitutional validity of the Howard government's WorkChoices legislation. Callinan's judgment in that case is the longest in the history of the High Court, containing approximately 55,000 words and running for 165 pages.

There is nothing in the text or the structure of the Constitution to suggest that the Commonwealth's powers should be enlarged, by successive decisions of this Court, so that the Parliament of each State is progressively reduced until it becomes no more than an impotent debating society. This Court too is a creature of the Constitution. Its powers are defined in Ch III, and legislation made under it. The Court goes beyond power if it reshapes the federation. By doing that it also subverts the sacred and exclusive role of the people to do so under s 128.

— Justice Ian Callinan, New South Wales v Commonwealth

Consistent with his restrained approach to constitutional interpretation and preference for democratic participation in constitutional alteration, Callinan expressed dissatisfaction with the High Court's implied rights jurisprudence and, in particular, the Court's decision in Lange v Australian Broadcasting Corporation [1997] HCA 25, which confirmed an implied constitutional right to political communication. In Coleman v Power Callinan cast doubt on the constitutional foundation for the Lange implication, but did not need to decide whether it was correct in order to decide the case.

He has called for debate on a tort of interference with privacy in his judicial and extrajudicial writing. That call was first made in his reasons for judgment in Australian Broadcasting Corporation v Lenah Game Meats Pty Ltd.

It seems to me that, having regard to current conditions in this country, and developments of the law in other common law jurisdictions, the time is ripe for consideration whether a tort of invasion of privacy should be recognised in this country, or whether the legislatures should be left to determine whether provisions for a remedy for it should be made.

— Justice Ian Callinan, ABC v Lenah Game Meats

He set out his own views on how the law should respond to 'rights of privacy' in an article published in the Oxford University Commonwealth Law Journal in 2007 entitled "Privacy, Confidence, Celebrity and Spectacle", in which he called for the development of a tort of privacy and indicated a preference for tortious protection of privacy and image rather than the expansion of the equitable doctrine of breach of confidence.

While on the High Court he spoke out against the death penalty (which has been abolished in Australia), most notably in a speech to the 2005 Law Asia conference.

The criminal justice system is fallible. Mistakes occur. Any system that retains the death penalty will inevitably, even if infrequently, cause an innocent person to die. It is not within our capability to avoid the possibility of error. In my experience, the phenomenon of human fallibility is irrefutable, and, in my view, must be accorded primacy when weighing the arguments in favour of, and against, the death penalty ... There does seem to be little empirical data to suggest that the death penalty is a greater deterrent than imprisonment for life without parole. The fallibility of the criminal justice system, the inability to prove the deterrence theory, and my personal revulsion of state sponsored execution of human beings support the abolition of capital punishment.

— Justice Ian Callinan AC, "Capital Punishment", Speech to the 2005 LAWASIA Conference (22 March 2005)

Callinan was described by Justice Susan Kenny of the Federal Court of Australia in article published in 2003 as 'the leading' exponent of the 'prudential ethical' method of constitutional adjudication during the 2002 term. Justice Kenny defined the 'prudential ethical mode' as 'a constitutional argument that relies on economic, social or political considerations attending the case ... a self-consciously evaluative style'.

Callinan's broader legal philosophy was considered by Professor Michael Bryant in a 2008 article published in the University of Queensland Law Journal. Bryant concluded that in his judgments on private law, Callinan 'showed a strong preference for achieving corrective justice, and a corresponding reluctance to take into account arguments based on considerations of distributive justice ... based on clearly held and expressed views on the proper limits of the appellate judicial role'.

== Post-judicial activities ==
=== Government inquiries ===
Immediately upon his retirement from the High Court, Callinan was called back into public service through his appointment to conduct a Commission of Inquiry into the outbreak of equine influenza in Australia. His report was handed down in April 2008 and on 12 June 2008 the Commonwealth Government responded to the report, accepting all 38 of its recommendations and putting in place an implementation program.

On 11 October 2012, he was appointed by the Queensland Attorney-General to conduct a review of the Crime and Misconduct Commission.

On 20 August 2013, Callinan released a report commissioned by the Victorian Minister for Corrections and Minister for Crime Prevention, Edward O'Donohue, on the state of the parole system in Victoria. The report stated that the parole board frequently put the rights of prisoners ahead of community safety when issuing parole. As an example, Callinan used the Jill Meagher case, in which Adrian Bayley raped and murdered Meagher, to highlight the flaws within the system, stating that "the Parole Board had both cause and opportunity to cancel Bayley's parole" prior to the incident.

In March 2015, the New Zealand Government chose Callinan to review once again David Bain's claims for compensation for wrongful conviction and imprisonment after rejecting an earlier report by Canadian judge Ian Binnie. On 26 January 2016, Callinan's report was delivered to New Zealand Justice Minister Amy Adams and on 2 August 2016, Adams formally announced that his finding was that Bain did not meet the threshold of "innocent on the balance of probabilities".

In 2016, Callinan was appointed by the Deputy Premier of New South Wales Troy Grant MP to conduct a review of the effectiveness of the Sydney lockout laws, which restrict the sale of alcohol and the admission of patrons to some alcohol-serving venues. Callinan's review was submitted to the Government on 13 September. As of October 2016, the recommendations were yet to be taken up by the State Government.

=== Private arbitrations and mediations ===
Since leaving the High Court bench, Callinan has been appointed to arbitrate and mediate many disputes, including arbitrating claims by customers of the Commonwealth Bank arising out of the collapse of Storm Financial, mediating a dispute between a rebel Catholic parish and the Archbishop of Brisbane, mediating sexual assault claims involving the Catholic Diocese of Toowoomba and acting as global mediator of claims arising out of the collapse of the Westpoint Corporation.

In July 2014 he was appointed Chairman of the Commonwealth Bank of Australia's Independent Review Panel for its Open Advice Review Program (OARP). The OARP was established by the Commonwealth Bank following a Senate Economics References Committee Inquiry into ASIC's performance. The other Panel members are the Hon. Julie Dodds-Streeton and the Hon. Geoffrey Davies AO.

== International Court of Justice ==
On 20 January 2014 Callinan became an ad hoc Judge of the International Court of Justice (ICJ) for the proceeding Timor-Leste v Australia (The Case Concerning Questions relating to the Seizure and Detention of Certain Documents and Data), after being nominated by the Commonwealth of Australia. On the same day the ICJ commenced hearing a request by Timor-Leste for provisional measures of protection. On 3 March 2014, Callinan delivered a dissenting judgment on Timor-Leste's application for provisional measures.

== Other activities ==
While at the Bar, Callinan devoted much time to supporting the Arts in Queensland. He served on the board of many art galleries and was Chairman of Trustees of the Queensland Art Gallery and a trustee of the Brisbane Community Arts Centre and the Brisbane Civic Art Gallery Trust. He has also served as a member of the Council of the National Gallery of Australia.

Apart from his judicial writings he is a novelist (The Lawyer and the Libertine, The Missing Masterpiece, The Coroner's Conscience, Appointment at Amalfi, After the Monsoon, The Russian Master, Betrayals and The Only Case) and a playwright (Brazilian Blue, The Cellophane Ceiling, The Acquisition, A Hero's Funeral and The Turtle Towers Case). He has also written short stories.

He served on the board of several public companies before being appointed to the bench and was also a board member of the Australian Broadcasting Corporation. Between 2000 and 2008 he was the Chairman of the Australian Defence Force Academy, Australia's higher education institution for defence force personnel.

== Controversy ==
Shortly after his appointment to the High Court, advice given by Callinan while he was at the Bar became the subject of a major Federal Court case, in which it was found that the advice given by Callinan had resulted in proceedings being filed that were an abuse of the Court's process (White Industries v Flower & Hart). Callinan was not a party to the proceedings, but was called as a witness. The trial judge (Goldberg J) made adverse findings against both Callinan's instructing solicitors (who were the defendants to the proceedings) and Callinan. The trial judge referred the matter to the Commonwealth Attorney-General. The Attorney-General's Office did not proceed with the matter.

== Honours ==
In 2003, Justice Callinan was appointed a Companion of the Order of Australia (AC) for his services to the law, arts and the community. He received the Centenary Medal in 2001 for his service as a Justice of the High Court of Australia. Justice Callinan is also a life member of the Queensland Bar Association and of the Australian Bar Association and an honorary Fellow of the Institute of Arbitrators and Mediators in Australia.
