= Section 51(xx) of the Constitution of Australia =

Subsection of the Australian Constitution

Section 51(xx) of the Australian Constitution is a subsection of Section 51 of the Australian Constitution that gives the Commonwealth Parliament the power to legislate with respect to "foreign corporations, and trading or financial corporations formed within the limits of the Commonwealth". This power has become known as "the corporations power", the extent of which has been the subject of numerous judicial cases.

== Jurisprudence to 1971 ==
After the High Court's decision in Huddart, Parker & Co Ltd v Moorehead (1909), the "corporations" power was largely ignored as a basis for Commonwealth legislation. The majority judges agreed in this case that the power should be construed narrowly, though they were unable to agree on any appropriate interpretation. Their approach reflected the perceived need to protect "the reserved powers of the States", an idea abandoned in 1920 as a result of the Engineers case. Justice Issacs dissent in Huddart, Parker & Co. gave a broad meaning to s 51(xx) but attempted to set limits to the power, in particular pointing out:

- it is exerciseable wherever these specific objects are found, irrespective of whether they are engaged in foreign or interstate commerce, or commerce confined to a single State
- the power is to operate only on corporations of a certain kind, namely, foreign, trading, and financial corporations
- it is not a power to create or dissolve corporations
- it is not restricted to internal company regulation
- it is concerned with the regulation of the conduct of the corporations in their transactions with, or as affecting, the public

It was not until 1971, when Huddart, Parker & Co. was overruled in Strickland v Rocla Concrete Pipes Ltd, that the modern development of the power began. In that case, the leading judgment was delivered by Chief Justice Barwick, who, although agreeing that Isaacs' dissent in Huddart, Parker & Co. conformed to the reasoning in Engineers, refused to define the scope of the corporations power. He stated instead that "the decision as to the validity of particular laws yet to be enacted must remain for the Court when called upon to pass upon them".

== Corporations subject to the power ==
The High Court in New South Wales v Commonwealth (1990) (the Incorporation Case) confirmed that the ambit of the corporations power extends only to corporations that have already been formed, and, therefore, it does not include the power to incorporate them. It extends only to domestic corporations of a trading or financial character, and to all corporations formed outside Australia, and they are collectively referred to as "constitutional corporations".

In most of the early cases, the question of what aspects or activities of a corporation can be regulated under s 51(xx) was not directly addressed. Some incidental points were clarified in R v Australian Industrial Court; Ex parte CLM Holdings Pty Ltd. That case established that, where the activities of a s 51(xx) corporation were validly regulated, the conduct of individual persons taking part in those activities, such as company directors, could incidentally be regulated as well.

In Actors and Announcers Equity Association v Fontana Films Pty Ltd, the Court still did not deal directly with the regulation of a corporation's activities. The whole Court upheld a section that protected a corporation against a secondary boycott. The legislative purpose thus upheld was protection of corporations rather than regulation of them. The case also provided an opportunity for extensive discussion of how far the "corporations" power might extend.

The WorkChoices case provides the current definition for the extent of the corporations power, as noted in its majority opinion:

- the regulation of the activities, functions, relationships and the business of the specified types of corporation
- the creation of rights, and privileges belonging to such a corporation
- the imposition of obligations on it
- the regulation of the conduct of those through whom it acts, its employees and shareholders and, also, the regulation of those whose conduct is or is capable of affecting its activities, functions, relationships or business
- including laws prescribing the industrial rights and obligations of corporations and their employees and the means by which they are to conduct their industrial relations

== Characteristics of trading and financial corporations ==
Whether a corporation falls within the group of "trading or financial corporations" has been the focus of much attention and debate. The dominant issues revolve around the type of corporation and the nature of the activities that characterise it as falling within s. 51(xx). In that regard:

- A constitutional corporation can be a "trading corporation" and a "financial corporation" at the same time
- A "trading corporation" is one where trading is a substantial or significant part of its activities, and that determination is irrespective of the purpose for which the corporation formed (Quickenden v O'Connor)

- A trading corporation can be found to exist on the basis of the nature of its established activities (the "activities test"), or with respect to the objects for which it was incorporated (the "purpose test")
- "Trading activities" are those that involve some form of buying and selling, and generate revenue, regardless of whether carried out at a profit (R v Federal Court of Australia; Ex parte WA National Football League ("Adamson's case"))
- The type of ownership is not material—a State corporation established to generate electricity has been held to be subject to regulation (Tasmanian Dam case)
- Where a corporation has not yet commenced trading (i.e., a shelf company), it can still be subject to regulation based on its objects of incorporation (Fencott v Muller)
- however, the High Court, in a controversial ruling, has held that a municipal corporation was to be distinguished from a trading corporation, notwithstanding the fact that it carried out trading activities (R v Trade Practices Tribunal; Ex parte St George County Council )

- A "financial corporation" is one that engages in substantial financial activities or intends to do so, but it is not necessary for such activities to be predominant or characteristic of it—however, a corporation that carries on substantial financial activities in the course of carrying on its primary business will be classified as a financial corporation (State Superannuation Board of Victoria v Trade Practices Commission)

== See also ==
- WorkChoices
- Workplace Relations Act 1996
