= Section 51 of the Constitution of Australia =

Legal powers of the Australian parliament

Section 51 of the Constitution of Australia enumerates the legislative powers granted to the Parliament of Australia by the Australian States at Federation. Each subsection, or 'head of power', provides a topic under which the parliament is empowered to make laws. There are other sections in the constitution that enable the parliament to enact laws, although the scope of those other sections are generally limited in comparison with section 51.

== Text ==
The Parliament shall, subject to this Constitution, have power to make laws for the peace, order, and good government of the Commonwealth with respect to:

(i) Trade and commerce with other countries, and among the States;
(ii) Taxation; but so as not to discriminate between States or parts of States;
(iii) Bounties on the production or export of goods, but so that such bounties shall be uniform throughout the Commonwealth:
(iv) Borrowing money on the public credit of the Commonwealth;
(v) Postal, telegraphic, telephonic, and other like services;
(vi) The naval and military defence of the Commonwealth and of the several States, and the control of the forces to execute and maintain the laws of the Commonwealth;
(vii) Lighthouses, lightships, beacons and buoys;
(viii) Astronomical and meteorological observations;
(ix) Quarantine;
(x) Fisheries in Australian waters beyond territorial limits;
(xi) Census and statistics;
(xii) Currency, coinage, and legal tender: despite this, coins of the Australian pound were not introduced until 1910, following the enactment of the Coinage Act 1909. The federal government did not issue banknotes until 1913, following the passage of the Australian Notes Act 1910. From 1901 to 1910 the states could not issue tender and the Commonwealth had not issued tender, so private currency was used as the common medium of exchange whilst the British pound sterling was the national unit of account;
(xiii) Banking, other than State banking; also State banking extending beyond the limits of the State concerned, the incorporation of banks, and the issue of paper money;
(xiv) Insurance, other than State insurance; also State insurance extending beyond the limits of the State concerned;
(xv) Weights and measures;
(xvi) Bills of exchange and promissory notes;
(xvii) Bankruptcy and insolvency;
(xviii) Copyrights, patents of inventions and designs, and trade marks;
(xix) Naturalization and aliens;
(xx) Foreign corporations, and trading or financial corporations formed within the limits of the Commonwealth;
(xxi) Marriage;
(xxii) Divorce and matrimonial causes; and in relation thereto, parental rights, and the custody and guardianship of infants;
(xxiii) Invalid and old-age pensions;
(xxiiiA) The provision of maternity allowances, widows' pensions, child endowment, unemployment, pharmaceutical, sickness and hospital benefits, medical and dental services (but not so as to authorize any form of civil conscription), benefits to students and family allowances;
(xxiv) The service and execution throughout the Commonwealth of the civil and criminal process and the judgments of the courts of the States;
(xxv) The recognition throughout the Commonwealth of the laws, the public Acts and records, and the judicial proceedings of the States;
(xxvi) The people of any race for whom it is deemed necessary to make special laws;
(xxvii) Immigration and emigration;
(xxviii) The influx of criminals;
(xxix) External affairs;
(xxx) The relations of the Commonwealth with the islands of the Pacific;
(xxxi) The acquisition of property on just terms from any State or person for any purpose in respect of which the Parliament has power to make laws;
(xxxii) The control of railways with respect to transport for the naval and military purposes of the Commonwealth;
(xxxiii) The acquisition, with the consent of a State, of any railways of the State on terms arranged between the Commonwealth and the State;
(xxxiv) Railway construction and extension in any State with the consent of that State;
(xxxv) Conciliation and arbitration for the prevention and settlement of industrial disputes extending beyond the limits of any one State:
(xxxvi) Matters in respect of which this Constitution makes provision until the Parliament otherwise provides;
(xxxvii) Matters referred to the Parliament of the Commonwealth by the Parliament or Parliaments of any State or States, but so that the law shall extend only to States by whose Parliaments the matter is referred, or which afterwards adopt the law;
(xxxviii) The exercise within the Commonwealth, at the request or with the concurrence of the Parliaments of all the States directly concerned, of any power which can at the establishment of this Constitution be exercised only by the Parliament of the United Kingdom or by the Federal Council of Australasia;
(xxxix) Matters incidental to the execution of any power vested by this Constitution in the Parliament or in either House thereof, or in the Government of the Commonwealth, or in the Federal Judicature, or in any department or officer of the Commonwealth.

== The powers ==
The powers enumerated within section 51 are reflective in their topics of being those that Australia's colonies perceived as being best within the purview of a national government. The full list of powers is available on the Australian Parliament's website.

In modern times, the most prominent heads of power for Commonwealth legislative purposes are arguably: (i) the interstate trade and commerce power, (ii) the taxation power, (xx) the corporations power, and (xxix) the external affairs power. This is because these sections have been interpreted by the High Court as wide in scope, and so are extensively relied upon by the Commonwealth when attempting legislative enactment. The wide scope of these sections have at times been legally controversial in Australia; most notably in the Workchoices and Tasmanian dams cases, which expanded the understood applicable scope of the corporations power, and external affairs power, respectively.

Other particularly notable powers in history have been the (vi) defence power, (see: Australian Communist Party v Commonwealth), the (xix) naturalisation and aliens power, the (xxxi) 'just terms' property acquisition power, the (xxvi) power to make special laws in relation to peoples of a particular race, and the s51(xxiii) & (xxiiiA) power to provide social services (notable in part for having been implemented in 1946 via referendum)

With some exceptions, the remainder of the powers in s51 pertain to the standardization of commerce across Australia, empowering the federal government to enact laws in relation to metrics, statistics, finance, interstate commercial disputes, and other related issues.

Additionally, two subsections provide for the referral of matters to the Australian Parliament by Australia's State Governments. Specifically, (xxxvii) allows State Parliaments to refer matters within their competence to the commonwealth, and (xxxviii) allows state parliaments to refer any matter that the UK Parliament or Federal Council of Australasia could legislate on their behalf at the establishment of the Commonwealth.

The incidental power (xxxix) allows the Commonwealth to act on matters 'incidental' any power of the constitution. Most notably this includes section 61 of the constitution, which vests the Australian Government with Executive Power. As a result, it is one of the most important sections in practice.

== Interpretive history ==
The High Court's approach to section 51 has changed over time. Initially, the court adopted the 'Reserved Powers' doctrine, an interpretive view that the Australian States had implicitly retained competence in core areas, which were unable to be displaced by the Commonwealth even through reliance upon the powers enumerated in s51.

This doctrine was famously, and emphatically, rejected by the Isaacs court in the Engineers' Case. Following this case, the reserved powers doctrine was abandoned; although it has notably reappeared a number of times in argument by State governments when arguing against Commonwealth legislation.

Since federation the enumerated powers in section 51 have tended overall to have expanded in scope. In particular, the Corporations and external affairs powers are notable for having a significantly larger breadth in modern times than at federation.

When interpreting whether a particular act of parliament is within the scope, or is incidental to an enumerated power; the dominant legal test applied by the court has been whether the law in question is a reasonable and appropriate means of furthering an object or purpose in the power.

== Tied grants ==
In practice, section 51 is not a strong limit on federal involvement in Australia's political life. Section 96 of the Australian Constitution grants the power to grant money to any State, "on such terms and conditions as the Parliament thinks fit." In effect, the Commonwealth can make grants subject to States implementing particular policies in their fields of legislative responsibility. Such grants, known as tied grants (since they are tied to a particular purpose), have been used to give the federal parliament influence over state policy matters such as public hospitals and schools.

Section 96 does not compel a state to accept a grant, so constitutionally a state may refuse a grant and not implement any policy conditions. However, since a uniform federal system of income tax was introduced in 1942 (under s51(ii)) a vertical fiscal imbalance has arisen and the Commonwealth Parliament has had a vastly larger budget. It also has control over state borrowings (under subsection iv). This has meant that the Parliament's powers have effectively been extended beyond the constraints of section 51 and other explicit grants of legislative power (e.g. section 52 and section 90).

== See also ==
- Section 51(xxxviii) of the Constitution of Australia
- Enumerated powers (United States)
