= Australian constitutional law =

Australian constitutional law is the area of the law of Australia relating to the interpretation and application of the Constitution of Australia. Legal cases regarding Australian constitutional law are often handled by the High Court of Australia, the highest court in the Australian judicial system. Several major doctrines of Australian constitutional law have developed.

== Background ==
Constitutional law in the Commonwealth of Australia consists mostly of that body of doctrine which interprets the Commonwealth Constitution. The Constitution itself is embodied in clause 9 of the Commonwealth of Australia Constitution Act, which was passed by the British Parliament in 1900 after its text had been negotiated in Australian Constitutional Conventions in the 1890s and approved by the voters in each of the Australian colonies. The British government did, however, insist on one change to the text, to allow a greater range of appeals to the Privy Council in London. It came into force on 1 January 1901, at which time the Commonwealth of Australia came into being.

The Constitution created a framework of government some of whose main features, and sources of inspiration, were the following:

- constitutional monarchy (British and existing colonial models)
- federalism (United States model)
- parliamentary, or "responsible", government (British and existing colonial models)
- distinct textual separation of powers (US model)
- direct election to both Houses of Parliament (then a novelty)
- Governor-General as a representative of a monarch (existing colonial models, notably Canada)
- requirement of a referendum for amendment of the Constitution (Swiss model)
- only very limited guarantees of personal rights (rejection of the US model)
- judicial review (US model)

== The Constitution and the High Court ==
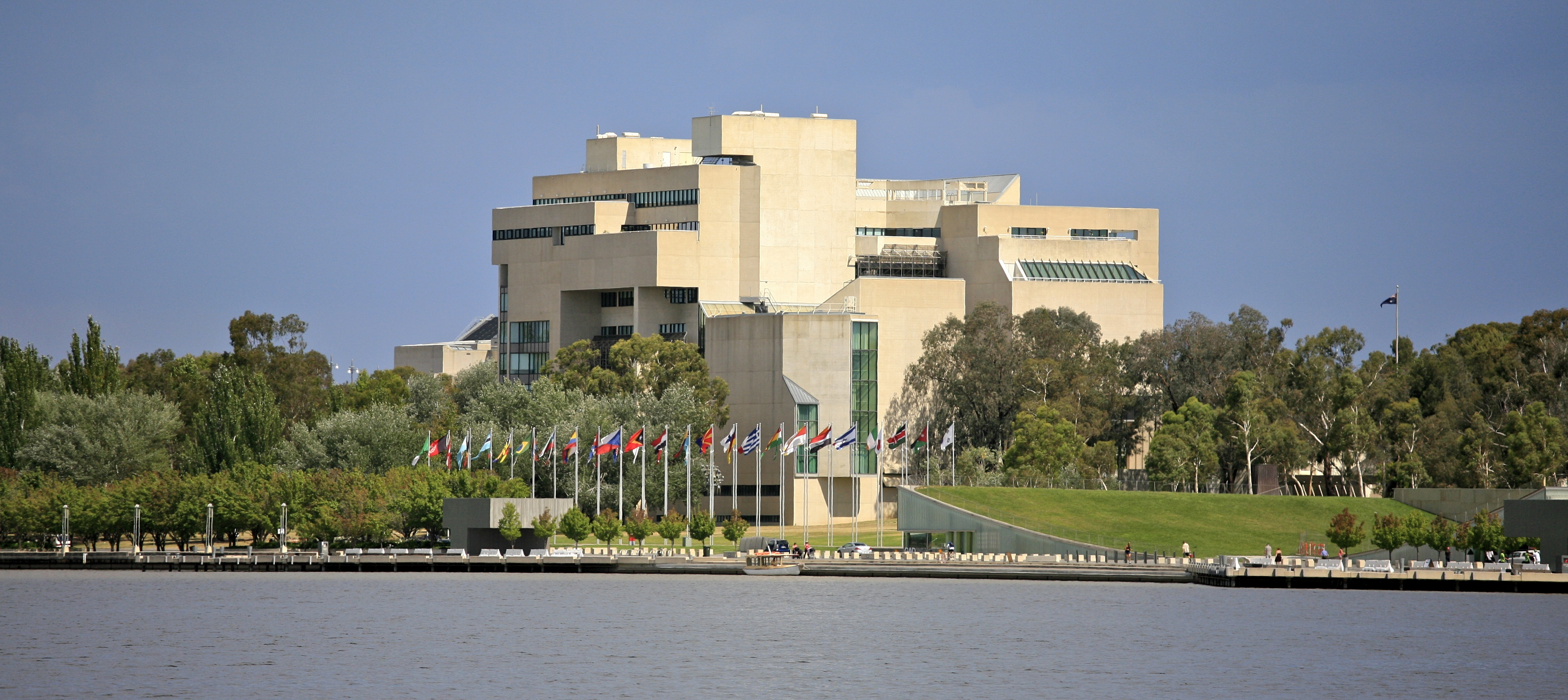
The High Court of Australia in Canberra, ACT

The process of judicial review – the ability of The High Court of Australia to declare legislation unconstitutional and therefore invalid – has its origin in American experience, where the right of the Supreme Court of the United States to strike down legislation deemed incompatible with the Constitution was first asserted by the Supreme Court itself in the seminal case of Marbury v. Madison in 1803. Although completely foreign to both British and Australian colonial experience, the framers of the Australian Constitution clearly intended that the practice would take hold in Australia, and even expressly adverted to it in the Constitutional text (in section 76). This power of judicial review of legislation for conformity with the Constitution has been exercised almost exclusively by the High Court of Australia, and almost invariably with a full bench of all its members, such as in the Communist Party case. Influence from American jurisprudence has occurred in specific cases.

A brief overview of the other listed features will provide a background for the doctrinal developments examined below.

== Constitutional monarchy ==
Australia is a constitutional monarchy. Although the term "Head of State" is not used in the Constitution, it was intended that the Commonwealth (like the colonies) would continue to recognise the British Sovereign. "The Queen" (meaning Queen Victoria, defined to include "Her Majesty's heirs and successors in the sovereignty of the United Kingdom"), was one of the three elements of Parliament, along with the Senate and the House of Representatives (section 1). Today, the King of Australia has replaced the King of the United Kingdom within Australia's parliament, but they happen to be the same person. The Monarch is represented in Australia by an appointed Governor-General. The executive power is vested in the Governor-General "as the Queen's representative" (section 61), as is the command-in-chief of the armed forces (section 68).

The Australian Constitution provides the Governor-General with a number of powers, including; the power to dissolve Parliament (Sections 5, 57), the power to refuse assent to bills presented to her (section 58) and the power to dismiss the government Ministers (section 64)., however, the practical use of such powers is restricted by constitutional convention, which mandate the Governor General to act on ministerial advice, except in exceptional circumstances. Because the conventions are not written in The Constitution, the limits of the Governor General's powers are unclear. Convention does, however, allow The Governor General to exercise some powers without ministerial advice in exceptional circumstances. These powers are known as reserve powers.

The reserve powers allow The Governor General to commission a Prime Minister when no party, or coalition of parties has a majority of seats in The House of Representatives and the power to dismiss a Prime Minister, who has been subject to a vote of no confidence in the House of Representatives.

The reserve powers may also include the power to dismiss a Prime Minister who is engaging in persistent illegal action (Governor Sir Philip Game of New South Wales dismissed Premier Jack Lang on this ground in 1932). However, it remains controversial whether they include the power to dismiss a Prime Minister who, while retaining the confidence of the House of Representatives, is not able to get the annual supply Bill passed by the Senate, as happened during the Australian constitutional crisis of 1975 when the Governor-General acted against the advice of Ministers.

The role of the Monarch is today even more circumscribed and amounts only to appointing (and, in theory, dismissing) a Governor-General on the advice of the Prime Minister, as well as performing (by invitation) certain ceremonial functions when personally present in Australia. See Constitutional history of Australia for further details on the development of the monarch's role in relation to Australia.

The importance of constitutional conventions in this area means that Australia cannot be said, strictly, to operate entirely under a written constitution, but has to some extent a system like the British unwritten constitution. However, it would be a mistake to exaggerate the importance of this aspect of Australia's constitutional arrangements:

- the reliance on constitutional convention is confined almost entirely to the relations between the Queen/Governor-General and the Ministers of State; and
- more completely written constitutional systems also develop binding conventions: for instance, popular election to the Electoral College of the United States, though not mandated by the United States Constitution, has probably become a binding norm.

== Federalism ==
=== Division of powers ===
The Constitution sets up the Commonwealth of Australia as a federal polity, with enumerated limited specific powers conferred on the Federal Parliament. The State Parliaments are not assigned specific enumerated powers; rather the powers of their predecessor colonial Parliaments are continued except insofar as they are expressly withdrawn or vested exclusively in the Federal Parliament by the Constitution. The framers rejected an alternative model, the Canadian, which has been described as "an allocation of exclusive powers to both levels of government, not concurrent powers."

The bulk of enumerated powers are contained in section 51 and section 52. Section 52 powers are 'exclusive' to the Commonwealth (although some section 51 powers are in practice necessarily exclusive, such as the power with respect to borrowing money on the public credit of the Commonwealth in paragraph (iv), and the power to legislate with respect to matters referred to the Commonwealth by a State in paragraph (xxxvii)). By contrast, the subjects in section 51 can be legislated on by both state and Commonwealth parliaments. However, in the event of inconsistency or an intention by the Commonwealth to cover the field the Commonwealth law prevails (section 109).

Both concurrent (section 51) and exclusive (section 52) powers are stated to be "subject to this Constitution". As a result, the Commonwealth's law-making power is subject to the limitations and guarantees in the Constitution (both express and implied). For example, section 99 forbids the Commonwealth from giving preference to any State or part of a State "by any law or regulation of trade, commerce, or revenue". And as discussed below, an implied guarantee of freedom of political communication has been held to limit the Commonwealth's power to regulate political discourse.

The list of powers assigned to the Federal Parliament is quite similar to that assigned by the United States Constitution to the Congress, but is in some respects broader: for instance, it includes "astronomical and meteorological observations", marriage and divorce, and interstate industrial relations. The interpretation of similar heads of power – for instance the Trade and Commerce Power in Australia and the Commerce Clause in the US – has in some cases been different.

The constitution also provides some opportunities for Federal-State co-operation: any State can "refer" a "matter" to the Commonwealth Parliament, and the Commonwealth Parliament can exercise, "at the request or with the concurrence of the Parliaments of all the States directly concerned", any power which, at the time of Federation, could be exercised only by the British Parliament.

=== Parliamentary structures ===
Representation in the House of Representatives is based on population and 'original states' have equal numbers in the Senate. The two houses are equal in power except for certain restrictions in financial matters. For example, the Senate may not amend a supply Bill, although as the Australian constitutional crisis of 1975 demonstrates, it may defer or refuse to pass such a Bill altogether; Bills to impose taxation or appropriate revenue may not originate in the Senate; and the Senate may not amend a Bill so as to increase taxation.

Again, federalism is evident in the process of constitutional amendment, which requires that the Bill to amend the Constitution be approved by a majority of electors overall and a majority of electors in a majority of States (that is, four out of the six).

Additionally, amendments "altering the limits" of a State or diminishing its proportional representation in Parliament require the approval of electors in that State.

== Parliamentary government ==
It was assumed by the framers, in line with British and local colonial tradition, that the executive government would consist of Ministers who were members of Parliament and "responsible", that is, answerable, to it, and that the continued existence of the government would depend on it maintaining the confidence in the House of Representatives.

These arrangements, however, are only hinted at in the text of the Constitution. There is a requirement (section 64) that the "Queen's Ministers of State", who are nominally appointed by the Governor-General, be or swiftly become members of either House of Parliament. The existence of the Prime Minister and Cabinet, and the requirement for them to have the confidence of the House of Representatives, are not mentioned. Nonetheless, these have been fundamental features of Australian constitutional practice from the start. More recently, the principle of responsible government was reinforced by the High Court of Australia which upheld orders for a Minister of the government to table documents in the NSW Legislative Council after he refused to do so.

== Separation of powers ==
The Constitution features a distinct separation of powers. Legislative power is dealt with in Chapter I, and is vested in the Federal Parliament (section 1). Executive power is dealt with in Chapter II, and is vested in the Governor-General as the Queen's representative (section 61). The judicature is dealt with in Chapter III, and is vested in the Federal High Court and "in such other federal courts as the Parliament creates, and in such other courts as it invests with federal jurisdiction" (section 71).

However, the Queen is an element of the Parliament as well as being head of the executive; and the Ministers of State who "advise" the Governor-General are actually required to be or become members of Parliament.

While there is no significant separation of the legislative and executive powers (the "political branches"), the High Court has developed an increasingly stringent doctrine of the separation of the judicial power from the other two.

== Direct election to both Houses of Parliament ==
The Constitution required direct election of members to both Houses of Parliament from the beginning (sections 7 and 24). This was a novelty at the time, since the national upper houses with which the framers were best acquainted were chosen by other means: indirect election by the State legislatures (United States Senate before the Seventeenth Amendment in 1913), executive appointment for life (Senate of Canada), or a combination of appointment for life and hereditary succession (British House of Lords).

== Referendum for constitutional amendment ==
The text of the Constitution was not presented to the British Parliament for formal enactment until it had been approved by the electors of the colonies.

On the same principle, any amendment to the Constitution requires approval at a referendum, by the process set out in section 128 of the Constitution. A double majority – a majority of electors and of a majority of states – is required.

Constitutional referendums were based on the Swiss practice. However, the Swiss use of the popular initiative in constitutional amendment was not followed, so that constitutional alterations, although they must be approved by the people, can only be initiated by Parliament.

The use of the referendum in initially adopting the Constitution, and its requirement for constitutional amendment, has been cited by justices of the High Court to argue that the Constitution is fundamentally based on popular sovereignty (rather than on the supremacy of the British Parliament, which is its technical legal foundation). This doctrine has achieved greater prominence since the cessation, in 1986, of all authority of that Parliament over Australia: see Constitutional history of Australia for details.

There have been 44 proposals for constitutional amendment put to the people since Federation. Of these, only 8 have passed.

== Growth of federal power ==
Probably the most obvious development in Australian constitutional law has been the steady growth in the power of the federal government relative to the states. Several factors could account for this, including:

- doctrines of constitutional interpretation which favour a broad reading of Commonwealth powers
- the "fiscal imbalance" between the Commonwealth and the States (see Constitutional basis of taxation in Australia)
- the development of new areas of competence which did not exist at Federation, and which have fallen to the Commonwealth
- the growing importance of legislative areas that were always Commonwealth powers (for example, external affairs and trading corporations)
- constitutional amendment or referral by the States
- the willingness of Australian governments, including supporters of States' rights, to exercise their powers to the full

=== Centralising interpretations ===
==== Reserved State powers doctrine and the Engineers case ====
Prior to 1920 the "reserved State powers" doctrine and "implied inter-governmental immunities" were used to preserve state power. Reserved state powers holds that the Constitution should be read in a restrictive way so as to preserve as much autonomy as possible for the States. Implied intergovernmental immunities holds that Commonwealth and States are immune to each other's laws and cannot mutually regulate each other's governmental apparatus.

In 1920, the Engineer's case (after changes in the composition of the Court) swept away this doctrine. The court now insisted on adhering only to interpreting a statute "expounded according to the intent of the Parliament that made it; and that intention has to be found by an examination of the language used in the statute as a whole". There was to be no reading in of implications by reference to the presumed intentions of the framers.

As a result, the constitution is no longer read in a way which attempts to preserve the power of the states.

==== Broad interpretation of Commonwealth powers ====
Even before the Engineer's case, a line of judicial reasoning asserted that Commonwealth powers should be interpreted broadly rather than narrowly wherever possible.

After Engineers, this approach was reinforced. For example, Section 109, regarding inconsistency between Commonwealth and State laws, was broadly interpreted. Commonwealth law prevails not only where inconsistent obligations are imposed, but where Commonwealth legislation evinces an intention to "cover the field" by being the whole law on a particular subject. The Commonwealth can "manufacture" inconsistency by expressly stating that its legislation is intended to cover the field. However, an issue that was raised, without being conclusively resolved, in the Workplace Relations Challenge was whether the Commonwealth can "clear the field" by stating an intention that State laws are not to apply even if the Commonwealth does not enact other laws in their place.

The Commonwealth can only legislate with respect to an enumerated head of power, This does not mean that the law must be solely, or even predominantly, directed at that head of power. As long as it can be "fairly characterized" as a law with respect to an enumerated power, it is irrelevant that it could also be categorised as a law regarding some other subject matter.

Likewise, Parliament's motivation in passing the law is irrelevant. An example is environmental legislation. The Constitution does not provide the Commonwealth Parliament with any power to control the environment or its use. Nonetheless, a very broad-ranging environmental protection Act could be passed relying on a combination of powers such as interstate and international trade, corporations, taxation, foreign affairs and so on. The law can be supported by those powers although Parliament intended it to be an 'environmental law'. Particularly in the last two decades, many Acts of very wide-ranging effect have been passed on just these bases, in fields as diverse as environment protection, privacy, and anti-discrimination, fields in which the Commonwealth has no direct power.

=== Fiscal imbalance ===
At the time of Federation, the colonies' main source of revenue consisted of customs and excise duties (income tax being still a newer notion). Since one of the main reasons for Federation was to create a common market, inevitably authority over these taxes was vested exclusively in the Commonwealth Parliament (section 90). It was acknowledged that this would create a situation where the Commonwealth would raise much more money than it could spend, whereas the States, being still responsible for most areas of law and of social infrastructure, would need to spend much more money than they could raise (the problem now known as "vertical fiscal imbalance"). Although the framers were able to agree on a formula for distribution of the Commonwealth's surplus to the States in the first few years after Federation, they could not agree on a long-term formula. Accordingly, section 96 of the Constitution provides that the Commonwealth Parliament "may grant financial assistance to any State on such terms and conditions as it thinks fit".

One result of this has been that the Commonwealth has been able to make grants to the States on terms so specific as to amount to the virtual takeover of particular fields of competence. For instance, although the Constitution gives the Commonwealth no express power over education, by means of "tied grants" it has in fact become paramount in the field of tertiary education. Although any state has the option to refuse a grant, the consequences of doing so make this unattractive. Similarly, the Commonwealth has become dominant in the field of public hospitals, and a major player in the field of roads and other major infrastructure.

The Commonwealth has also come to monopolise income tax. Once the advantages of income tax were recognised, both the Commonwealth and the States levied income taxes. However, during World War II, the Commonwealth government decided to take over the collection of income taxes and return some proceeds to the States as grants. The Commonwealth passed legislation to levy income tax at a nationwide rate similar to the previous combination of Commonwealth tax and the various state taxes. Separate legislation then granted section 96 monetary grants to states if the State did not levy income taxes. In practice, it would be difficult for States to continue taxing.

This arrangement was twice challenged by the States in the High Court and twice upheld. In the Second Uniform Tax case the taxation part of the scheme was held to be valid based on the taxation power, and the grants held to be valid on the basis of the words 'terms and conditions' of section 96.

States are also at the mercy of the High Court's definition of an "excise duty," which states cannot levy. The High Court has long stated the definition in terms such as "an inland tax on a step in production, manufacture, sale or distribution of goods". However, it does not include a mere fee for a licence to carry on a particular business or profession. Accordingly, the States had for a long time levied, with the compliance of the High Court, "business franchise fees" on retailers of products, particularly liquor and tobacco products.

These "franchise fees" were mostly calculated according to the value of the retailer's sales in a specific preceding period, rather than on the value of goods currently being sold. Although these seem similar to excise duties, a series of High Court precedents had effectively "quarantined" such fees from disallowance in the areas of liquor retailing, tobacco retailing, and petrol distribution. In 1997, by a bare majority, the High Court decided that this area of doctrinal quarantine was incoherent with the rest of the law relating to excise duties and removed it. The immediate result was the loss of some $5 billion (Australian) in the annual revenues of the States and Territories.

In 1999, the Commonwealth Parliament passed legislation introducing a new broad-based Federal indirect tax, the Goods and Services Tax; the revenue from this tax was to go entirely to the States and Territories in exchange for abolishing a range of other indirect taxes. By this stage, the financial dependence of the States on the Commonwealth had become almost complete.

=== New areas of competence ===
The development of various technologies during the twentieth century also added to the power of the centre. Section 51(v) of the Australian Constitution gives the Commonwealth Parliament power over "postal, telegraphic, telephonic, and other like services". With little controversy, this power now covers radio, television, satellite, cable, and optic fibre technologies.

A greater struggle occurred over Commonwealth legislation in the field of aviation. Commonwealth regulation is based on the interstate and international trade and commerce power. Prima facie, it does not cover intrastate aviation. However, a purely intrastate aviation industry is no longer economically feasible and separate systems of state regulation pose safety concerns. As a result, the High Court held that all aviation has an interstate character, placing it within Commonwealth legislative power. In 1937 a referendum was submitted to the people giving the Commonwealth power over aviation, and that the referendum was rejected by the people. The rejection of a power by the people has never persuaded the Court that the Commonwealth should not exercise the power.

Another example concerns intellectual property. Although the Constitution gave the Commonwealth Parliament power over "copyrights, patents of inventions and designs, and trade marks", the enormous growth of electronic media content has given this power a much wider scope than could possibly have been envisaged at Federation.

=== New powers ===
The Commonwealth power has been extended by four constitutional amendments. An amendment in 1910 and an amendment in 1928 allowed the Commonwealth to take over and manage state debts. An amendment passed in 1967 gave the Commonwealth power over Aboriginal affairs, which has had a significant effect particularly in the pastoral and central regions of Australia.

An amendment passed in 1946 gave the Commonwealth power to provide a wide range of social services. This included unemployment and sickness benefits, maternity allowances, child endowment, and medical and dental services. Apart from defence, social services is the largest area of Commonwealth expenditure. Along with the grants power, it is the basis for the Medicare scheme of universal health insurance.

The High Court decided that the corporations power was not broad enough to cover incorporation itself. This decision threatened the validity of Australian companies incorporated under commonwealth law. The states used 'the referral power' to refer the power over incorporation to the Commonwealth Parliament.

=== The external affairs power ===
The Constitution gives the Commonwealth Parliament power over "external affairs". Originally this power had little content, because Australia's foreign relations were managed by the United Kingdom. As Australia gained independence and international personality, so did the significance of this power.

Australia's relations with other countries fall directly under the subject of external affairs. It includes relations with other British Dominions and further extends to relations with international organisations. The pursuit and advancement of friendliness with foreign governments is another vital aspect under the external affairs power. The High Court has held that the power covers the regulation of conduct that takes place outside Australia, suggesting that mere externality to Australia could enliven the power. In particular, Commonwealth legislation of 1998 that retroactively criminalised war crimes committed during World War II in Europe by Australian citizens was held a valid exercise of the external affairs power.

The power has also been held to extend to the implementation of international treaties, even if the subject matter of the treaty is otherwise not within Commonwealth power. In the case of Koowarta v Bjelke-Petersen, the High Court found that the Commonwealth had the power to implement the United Nations Convention on the Elimination of All Forms of Racial Discrimination in the form of the Racial Discrimination Act. In the case of Tasmanian Dams Case, the High Court has upheld Commonwealth legislation forbidding the Tasmanian government from proceeding with a dam that would have submerged an area of Tasmanian government-owned land that had been declared a World Heritage Area under the World Heritage Convention to which Australia is a party. Land use is otherwise a State responsibility.

More recently, the external affairs power has been used to remove the States' power to criminalise male homosexual activity. This followed an adverse report by the Human Rights Committee on Tasmanian provisions. The Human Rights Committee was established under the International Covenant on Civil and Political Rights, to which Australia is a party. Rather than challenge the resulting Commonwealth Human Rights (Sexual Conduct) Act of 1994, the Tasmanian Parliament repealed the legislation in question.

Although it would appear that there is an open-ended potential for the Commonwealth to encroach on areas of traditional State competence through the external affairs power, to date it has been used with some discretion, if only because the use of the power in this way inevitably excites considerable political controversy.

=== The corporations power ===
The corporations power allows the Commonwealth to legislate on "foreign corporations, and trading or financial corporations formed within the limits of the Commonwealth". Although the width of the expression "trading or financial corporations" has never been authoritatively settled, it appears that it covers at least all commercial enterprises carried out under the corporate form.

As corporations have come to dominate the economy, the practical scope the corporations power has increased. For example, in 2005 the Commonwealth Parliament enacted the WorkChoices legislation, which, relying primarily on the corporations power, seeks to create a uniform national industrial relations system to the exclusion of both the States' and the Commonwealth's own industrial relations systems. Previous systems were based on the 'conciliation and arbitration' power. The new legislation applies to all employees of a "constitutional corporation." A constitutional corporation is a corporation within the meaning of section 51(xx) of the Constitution. The legislation also applies to employees of the Commonwealth and its agencies, and some others. The expected coverage of this law is approximately 85% of the Australian workforce. That proportion is likely to increase as employers who operate as sole traders or in partnerships incorporate to take advantage of the new legislation's relatively "employer-friendly" provisions.

On 14 November 2006, the High Court by a 5-to-2 majority upheld the validity of the WorkChoices legislation against all the challenges that had been made to it in an action brought by each of the States and mainland Territories, as well as certain trade unions. The single majority judgment, while it did not expressly adopt, waved aside all the objections that had been argued against the "object of command" test for the validity of the exercise of the corporations power. Accordingly, the judgment suggests that, henceforth, it may be a sufficient basis of validity that Federal legislation be specifically addressed to constitutional corporations ("A constitutional corporation must...", "A constitutional corporation must not..."), without any additional requirement that the legislation also address some aspect of the status or activities of corporations which is specific to such entities. If this is correct, then given the preponderant role of corporations in the modern economy, the possibility exists for substantial Federal control of the greater part of the economy, with little if any regard to the traditional constitutional "heads of power".

== Protection of rights ==
=== Access to the High Court ===
To a very large extent, the Constitution leaves it to Parliament to determine both the High Court's original jurisdiction (section 76), and the exceptions to, and conditions on, its power to hear appeals (section 73). However, the Constitution grants the Court some original jurisdiction directly, without the possibility of Parliamentary limitation (section 75). This includes matters in which "a writ of Mandamus or prohibition or an injunction is sought against an officer of the Commonwealth".

In recent years, the Parliament has all but eliminated the possibility of appeal against many decisions in the area of migration, especially in regard to applications for refugee status. However, since the Parliament is not constitutionally able to limit or abolish access to the High Court for the purpose of applying for one of these "constitutional writs", such applications have become a major means of challenging migration decisions. In 2014–15 94% of the applications for constitutional writs involved immigration matters.

=== No Bill of Rights ===
The Constitution contains no comprehensive set of human rights guarantees. Factors sometimes cited for this include faith in the common law's protection of rights and a belief that a powerful Senate would effectively resist overzealous governments. The Constitution does contain protection for several specific rights. These include:

- right to vote in Commonwealth elections if one can vote in State ones (section 41)
- freedom of religion, and prohibition of religious tests for Federal offices (section 116)
- trial by jury in Federal cases tried on indictment (section 80)
- "just terms" for the compulsory "acquisition" of property by the Commonwealth (section 51(xxxi))
- an ambiguously worded prohibition on discrimination against residents of other States (section 117)

All but the last of these have been read down by the High Court, at least relative to the content of the corresponding United States guarantees. On the other hand, since the 1990s the High Court has been developing a jurisprudence of rights said to be implied in the text and structure of the Constitution.

In addition, a constitutional requirement that "trade, commerce, and intercourse among the States ... shall be absolutely free" (section 92) was, for a time, interpreted as a guarantee of some degree of freedom from economic regulation by either Commonwealth or State Parliaments. The reference to "intercourse", on the other hand, has always been understood as guaranteeing a right to movement across State boundaries.

Although express protections for human and civil rights in the Constitution are scant, and have mostly been read down, some protections have been created by the High Court through its jurisprudence on the separation of powers and through its findings of rights implied by the text and structure of the constitutional document.

=== Express rights ===
As mentioned, there are five rights which the Constitution guarantees against the Commonwealth – religious freedom, trial by jury, "just terms" compensation, free trade between the states, and protection against discrimination based on the state an individual lives in. (A referendum proposal to amend the Constitution to clarify these rights and to make them good also against the States was defeated in 1988.) As will be seen, guaranteed access to the High Court can itself amount to an important right. And the guarantee of free trade and commerce was for a time interpreted as something like an individual right.

==== Freedom of religion ====
The Constitution states that the Commonwealth "shall not make any law for establishing any religion, or for imposing any religious observance, or for prohibiting the free exercise of any religion, and no religious test shall be required as a qualification for any office or public trust under the Commonwealth" (section 116).

In determining what is considered a religion, the High Court has adopted a broad approach; demonstrating an unwillingness to create a limiting definition.

The prohibition on establishing any religion has had nothing like the impact that the corresponding ban on making a law "respecting an establishment of religion" in the First Amendment to the United States Constitution has had in that country. The High Court, in rejecting a challenge to Federal funding of church schools, seemed to take the view that nothing less than an explicit establishment of a State Church as the official religion of the Commonwealth would come within the terms of the prohibition.

Section 116 also protects the right of a person to have no religion by prohibiting the Commonwealth from "imposing any religious observance".

==== "Just terms" compensation ====
The Constitution gives the Commonwealth power "with respect to ... the acquisition of property on just terms" in Section 51(xxxi). By contrast, the Fifth Amendment to the United States Constitution contains a prohibition: "nor shall private property be taken ... without just compensation". The differences between acquisition and taking, and between terms and compensation, combined with the fact that the Australian provision is expressed as a positive grant of power coupled with a limitation, have been read so as to weaken the Australian guarantee relative to the American one.

The use of the term "acquisition" has been interpreted so as to require that the Commonwealth (or some other party for a Commonwealth purpose) actually acquire possessory or proprietary rights over the property in question, or at least some benefit: the mere extinguishment of a person's proprietary rights by the Commonwealth (or a prohibition on effectively exercising them) is insufficient to amount to an acquisition. And "just terms" has been taken to mean something less than "just compensation"; in particular, it does not necessarily require payment to the owner of the value of the property when it was compulsorily acquired

The Australian film The Castle addresses this issue.

==== Protection against residency discrimination ====
Section 117 of the Constitution of Australia provides protection against discrimination on the basis of state of residence.

Historically, section 117 had been read down by the High Court so as to be devoid of any real meaning. For example, in 1904 it was found that discrimination in favour of people who are "residents of and domiciled in Western Australia" was permissible, as the Constitution only prohibited discrimination on the basis of a person's state of residence, not their state of domicile.

In the 1989 landmark case Street v Queensland Bar Association, the modern approach to interpretation was developed. The court held that the purpose of the section was national unity, and consequentially, residence should be given a broader meaning. In addition, the court overruled a case in which the historical approach was used.

In reaching its conclusion, each of the seven Justices issued a separate opinion. Combining this with the fact that there is little case law referencing section 117, there remains significant debate over the nature and extent of the right contained within it.

==== Trial by jury for indictable offences ====
The constitutional guarantee that a trial on indictment for a federal offence must be by jury (section 80) has been rendered virtually worthless because the High Court has decided that it is applicable only to a trial that proceeds formally by way of indictment, and it is completely in Parliament's discretion to decide which offences are triable on indictment and which are not. This narrow view is confirmed in the majority judgement of Kingswell v the Queen. Powerful dissents to the effect that the section must be given some substantive meaning (the trial of offences of some specific degree of gravity must be by jury) have not prevailed.

On the other hand, where Parliament has prescribed jury trial, the Court has been willing to impose some content on that notion. In particular, it has insisted that conviction by a jury for a Federal offence must be by the unanimous agreement of the jurors – a majority verdict will not suffice.

==== Freedom from economic regulation ====
The constitutional requirement that "trade, commerce, and intercourse amongst the States ... shall be absolutely free" (section 92) was for a considerable time interpreted as a guarantee of some degree of freedom from government regulation. A notable example of this line of jurisprudence was the High Court's disallowance of a Commonwealth Act which had the aim of nationalising the banking industry.

In 1988 following the decision in Cole v Whitfield, which was notable also for the Court's willingness to use the transcripts of the Convention debates as an aid to interpretation, the Court unanimously decided that what the section prohibited, in relation to interstate trade and commerce, were only "discriminatory burdens of a protectionist kind". That is, the section did no more than guarantee "free trade" (in the conventional sense) among the States. But in relation to "intercourse" (i.e. personal movement between States), the Court suggested that the scope of the guarantee would be much wider, and may even, in relation to some forms of such intercourse, be truly absolute.

=== Implied rights ===
Implied rights are the political and civil freedoms that necessarily underlie the actual words of the constitution but are not themselves expressly stated directly in the constitution. The High Court has held that no implication can be drawn from the Constitution which is not based on the actual terms of the Constitution, or on its structure. Since the 1990s the High Court has discovered rights which are said to be implied by the very structure and textual form of the Constitution. Chief amongst these is an implied right to freedom of communication on political matters. In addition, some protections of civil liberties have been the result of the High Court's zealous attempts to safeguard the independence of, and confidence in, the Federal judiciary.

==== Freedom of political communication ====
Two cases decided in 1992 established a new implied right to freedom of communication on political matters. The first case, Nationwide News Pty Ltd v Wills, concerned a Federal provision criminalising the "bringing into disrepute" of members of an industrial relations tribunal, and a prosecution under that provision of a person who had published a newspaper article repeatedly describing such members as "corrupt" and "compliant". The second case, Australian Capital Television Pty Ltd v Commonwealth, concerned a Federal attempt to ban political advertising on radio and television during election periods and to strictly control it at other times, via a system of "free time" entitlements.

In both cases, the majority of the High Court reasoned that, since the Constitution required direct election of members of the Federal Parliament, and since moreover the Ministers of State were required to be or swiftly become members of that Parliament, the result was that "representative democracy is constitutionally entrenched". That being so, freedom of public discussion of political and economic matters is essential to allow the people to make their political judgments so as to exercise their right to vote effectively. Furthermore, since "public affairs and political discussion are indivisible", it is impossible to limit this necessary freedom to purely Federal issues: it applies also to issues which might be the preserve of the State or local levels of government. Therefore, there is implied in the Constitution a guarantee of freedom of communication on all political matters.

The Court stressed that this freedom is not absolute, but the result in both cases was that the relevant Federal legislation was struck down. In the latter case, some strong dissents to the effect that limiting expenditure on political advertising in the electronic media might actually enhance representative democracy did not prevail.

Both these cases concerned the validity of Federal legislation. But two years later, the Court extended the implied guarantee into the area of private law, by holding that it also applied to limit the statutory and common law of defamation. A former chairman of a Commonwealth Parliamentary Committee on Migration claimed to have been defamed by a newspaper which had published a letter accusing him of bias, in his official capacity, towards people of his own ethnic background. By trial, it was conceded that the accusation was false. However the Court accepted a "constitutional defence" which was said (by three Justices) to operate when otherwise defamatory statements concerning the fitness of a public official to hold office were published without knowledge of, or recklessness as to, their falsity, and when publication was reasonable in the circumstances.

This case, however, and a series of following cases, failed to produce a clear statement of the operative principle which commanded the support of a majority of the Court. But in 1997 in Lange v Australian Broadcasting Corporation which involved the alleged defamation of a former Prime Minister of New Zealand a unanimous Court did state the operative principle. It rejected the "constitutional defence" of the migration-bias case just discussed, and instead expanded the scope of "qualified privilege", requiring the defendant to have actively taken reasonable steps to verify the accuracy of the published material, and also, in most circumstances, to have given the defamed person an opportunity to respond. On the other hand, the Court made it clear that the qualified privilege may extend to discussion concerning the United Nations and other countries, even where there is no direct nexus with the exercise of political choice in Australia. In McCloy v New South Wales, the High Court further endorsed the view that a qualified freedom of political communication exists and provided an updated and more detailed legal test.

The constitutional guarantee of freedom of political communication is, prima facie, far more restricted than the generalised guarantee of freedom of speech and of the press in the First Amendment to the United States Constitution. But it remains to be seen whether a suitable expansion of the notion of "political communication" may not lead, in time, to a similar result. In the migration-bias case, some of the Justices, while being careful to quarantine "commercial speech without political content", seemed to imply that the scope of "political speech" may nevertheless be very broad indeed. Mitchell Landrigan goes as far as arguing that the exception to the Anti-Discrimination Act 1977 (NSW) permitting the exclusion of women from ordination as priests infringes the right of women to "rise to positions from which they may take part in political speech as [politically persuasive] religious leaders." Any such constitutional protection would depend on a court finding that the anti-discrimination laws, first, effectively burdened political speech (as relevant to the Commonwealth Parliament) and, secondly, disproportionately burdened such speech.

==== Right to vote ====
The Constitution is silent as to many aspects of the democratic process, leaving these details to be provided by Parliament. The Constitution does however require in sections 7 and 24 that the members of Parliament be "directly chosen by the people". In 1975 two judges of the High Court suggested that these requirements may amount to a right to vote, holding "the long established universal adult suffrage may now be recognized as a fact and as a result it is doubtful whether ... anything less than this could be described as a choice by the people." In 1983 the High Court took a limited view of the right to vote in R v Pearson; Ex parte Sipka. The High Court Judge Michael Kirby, writing extrajudicially in 2000, said that "...in Australia, there may be a basic right to vote implied in the text of the constitution itself". Prior to 2006 prisoners were only disenfranchised if they were serving sentences of three years or more. 2006 legislation sought to disenfranchise all prisoners, regardless of the length of their sentence. The validity of the disenfranchisement was challenged by Vickie Roach who was serving a four-year jail term for negligently causing serious injury in a car accident and her legal team comprised Ron Merkel, QC and Michael Pearce, SC.

In 2007 the High Court held in Roach v Electoral Commissioner that the requirement that members be "directly chosen by the people" conferred a limited "right to vote". In principle, these words guaranteed qualified universal franchise, and limited the Federal government's legislative power to limit that franchise. The court held that removing right to vote for serious misconduct was acceptable and that the previous legislation was valid, however imprisonment failed as a method of identifying serious criminal misconduct such that the 2006 amendments were invalid.

The 2006 legislation was again considered in Rowe v Electoral Commissioner, where the High Court held that amendments restricting the enrolment of voters once an election has been called were also invalid. * The High Court subsequently held that closing the electoral roles 7 days after the issuing of writs was not a burden on the constitutional mandate that members of Parliament be directly chosen by the people. The right to vote does not involve a corresponding right not to vote. The High Court rejected a challenge to the 2016 Senate voting changes holding that both above the line and below the line voting were constitutionally valid methods for the people to choose their Senators.

==== Right to due process ====
As mentioned above, the fact that the Constitution prescribes a system of "responsible", or parliamentary, government means that there can be no meaningful separation of the legislative and executive powers, despite their distinct textual separation in the Constitution. However, the same consideration does not militate against a separation of the judicial power from the other two, and in fact the High Court has come to insist on this with some force. It has also held that the separation of the judicial power implies that a body exercising that power must do so in a manner that is consistent with traditional notions of what constitutes judicial process. The result may be a limited constitutional guarantee of due process.

The judicial power of the Commonwealth is vested, in Chapter III of the Constitution, in the High Court and such other courts as the Parliament creates or invests with Federal jurisdiction. (Note: High Court Justice Sir Owen Dixon described the power of the Australian Parliament to invest State courts with Federal jurisdiction as an "autochthonous expedient", essentially an economy measure in a country of small population.) In Australian constitutional jargon, such courts are called "Chapter III courts". The members of Chapter III courts may not be removed except by the Governor-General on an address from both Houses of Parliament on the ground of proved misbehaviour or incapacity; they otherwise hold office until the age of 70.

In separate cases in 1915, and 1918, the High Court held that "judicial power" (essentially, the power of interpretation of the law and enforcement of decisions) could not be invested in anything other than a Chapter III court, and specifically, in anything other than a body whose members have life tenure. In Kruger v Commonwealth (1997) the High Court considered claims by members of the Stolen Generation, including that their removal and subsequent detention without due process was in contravention of the Constitution. Dawson J, and McHugh J, held that the Constitution contained no general guarantee of due process of law. Toohey, Gaudron and Gummow JJ held that the removal of Indigenous children was not the exercise of judicial power, hence no question of due process arose.

The converse of the separation of powers is the decision of the High Court in Boilermakers' Case in 1956, that Chapter III courts cannot be invested with anything other than judicial power. To some extent the rigour of the separation of powers doctrine was softened by the Court's subsequent acceptance that judges could, constitutionally, be assigned functions in their personal capacity as judges rather than as members of a Chapter III court. But this raised the question of which such functions were compatible with the simultaneous holding of Federal judicial office. The answers offered by the Court have been controversial and involved some very fine distinctions: for instance, it has held that a power to authorise telephone interceptions is compatible, while a power to make recommendations concerning the protection of land which might be of heritage significance to Aboriginals is not compatible. The most striking application (and extension) of this "incompatibility" doctrine, however, has involved the Supreme Court of the State of New South Wales, a court that may be invested with Federal jurisdiction. Kable v Director of Public Prosecutions (1996) concerned a criminal law passed by the New South Parliament and directed at a single named individual (somewhat in the manner of a Bill of attainder).

The individual was a prisoner (under state law) whose sentence was about to expire but who was alleged to have made threats against the safety of various persons, to be carried out when released. The State Parliament enacted a law, applying only to him, which authorised the Supreme Court of New South Wales to make "preventive detention orders" for periods up to six months, with the possibility of renewal. The orders were to be made if the Court was satisfied, "on the balance of probabilities", that the person to whom the Act applied was "more likely than not to commit a serious act of violence".

It is clear that, had the Federal Parliament passed such an Act, it would be found invalid, as it was in effect a legislative judgment and so violated of the constitutional separation of the judicial power. However, the High Court found that the separation of powers was not a feature of the New South Wales constitution, so the State Act was not invalid on that ground.

The Act was found invalid, however, on the ground that since the Supreme Court of New South Wales had been invested with federal jurisdiction, it must not be required to perform a function "incompatible" with the exercise of the judicial power of the Commonwealth. To that extent, the States are not free to legislate as they please with respect to their own courts. A requirement to order the "preventive detention" of someone who has not been charged with any criminal offence was found "incompatible" with the exercise of Federal judicial power. In this rather circuitous manner, the High Court has found a limited constitutional guarantee of due process.

== See also ==
- Australian Constitution
- Constitutional history of Australia
- Separation of church and state in Australia
- Separation of powers in Australia
- Federalism in Australia
- Referendums in Australia
  - Section 51 of the Australian Constitution – federal heads of power

  - Trade and Commerce Power; Corporations Power; External Affairs Power

  - Section 109 of the Australian Constitution – inconsistency between state and federal laws

== Bibliography ==
- Tony Blackshield and George Williams, Australian Constitutional Law and Theory: Commentary and Materials (3rd ed., Federation Press, Annandale NSW, 2002)
- John Quick and Robert Garran, The Annotated Constitution of the Australian Commonwealth (LexisNexis Butterworths, Sydney, [1901] 2002)
- Leslie Zines, The High Court and the Constitution (4th ed., Butterworths, Sydney, 1997)
- Greg Craven, "Conversations with the Constitution" (1st ed, UNSW Press, Sydney, 2004)
