= Section 51(i) of the Constitution of Australia =

Section 51(i) of the Australian Constitution enables the Parliament of Australia to make laws about:

Trade and commerce with other countries, and among the States;

The meaning of trade and commerce is clarified in section 98 of the Constitution which provides

The power of the Parliament to make laws with respect to trade and commerce extends to navigation and shipping, and to railways the property of any State.

== Interpretation by the courts ==
"Trade" and "commerce" have been broadly construed. The early case of W & A McArthur Ltd v Queensland, declared:

"Trade and commerce" between different countries—we leave out for the present the word "intercourse"—has never been confined to the mere act of transportation of merchandise over the frontier. That the words include that act is, of course, a truism. But that they go far beyond it is a fact quite as undoubted. All the commercial arrangements of which transportation is the direct and necessary result form part of "trade and commerce." The mutual communings, the negotiations, verbal and by correspondence, the bargain, the transport and the delivery are all, but not exclusively, parts of that class of relations between mankind which the world calls "trade and commerce."

"Trade and commerce" has been subsequently held to include:

- financial transactions;
- Federal participation in trade and commerce;
- peripheral matters, such as the employment conditions of workers involved in such activity; and
- the absolution prohibition of a specific trade.

However, the High Court has also ruled that a distinction must be maintained between interstate trade and trade that is strictly within a State. In Wragg v New South Wales, Dixon J. remarked:

The distinction which is drawn between inter-State trade and the domestic trade of a State for the purpose of the power conferred upon the Parliament by s. 51 (i.) to make laws with respect to trade and commerce with other countries and among the States may well be considered artificial and unsuitable to modern times. But it is a distinction adopted by the Constitution and it must be observed however much inter-dependence may now exist between the two divisions of trade and commerce which the Constitution thus distinguishes. A legislative power, however, with respect to any subject matter contains within itself authority over whatever is incidental to the subject matter of the power and enables the legislature to include within laws made in pursuance of the power provisions which can only be justified as ancillary or incidental. But even in the application of this principle to the grant of legislative power made by s. 51 (i.) the distinction which the Constitution makes between the two branches of trade and commerce must be maintained. Its existence makes impossible any operation of the incidental power which would obliterate the distinction.

But the distinction between interstate and intrastate activity is not absolute. In Airlines of New South Wales Pty Ltd v New South Wales (No 2), Menzies J. noted:

If control of intra-State trade is necessary to make effectual the exercise of Commonwealth power, that control may be exercised by the Commonwealth itself regardless of the control exercised by a State and regardless, too, of the fact that at some previous time the Commonwealth, because of the control exercised by a State over its intra-State trade, refrained from the full exercise of its own power. Arguments based upon the extent of State legislative power, or, the extent to which that power has been exercised, to measure or confine the legislative power of the Commonwealth, must, since the Engineers Case, fall upon deaf ears.

To that end, it has been held:

- that s. 51(i) covers both interstate and intrastate activities where they are "inseparably connected";
- but the fact that an intra-state journey may economically be required to assure the operation of an interstate service has not been sufficient to allow the Commonwealth to regulate the entirety.

== Intersection with Section 92 ==
Section 92 states (in part) that:

On the imposition of uniform duties of customs, trade, commerce, and intercourse among the States, whether by means of internal carriage or ocean navigation, shall be absolutely free.

In the case of James v Commonwealth, which expanded on the previous ruling of the Judicial Committee of the Privy Council in James v Cowan, the High Court decided that this requirement restricted the Commonwealth Parliament as well as State Parliaments, thus greatly affecting the Parliament's authority under s. 51(i). In their judgement, Evatt and McTiernan JJ stated:

We are definitely of opinion that sec. 92 lays down a general rule of economic freedom, and necessarily binds all parties and authorities within the Commonwealth, including the Commonwealth itself, because, as was pointed out by the Privy Council itself, it establishes a "system based on the absolute freedom of trade among the States" (Colonial Sugar Refining Co v Irving).

== Comparisons ==
- Commerce Clause (United States' Constitution)
- Section 91(2) of the Constitution Act, 1867 (Canadian Constitution)
