= Western Australia v Commonwealth =

Western Australia v Commonwealth may refer to a number of High Court of Australia cases:

- Western Australia v Commonwealth (1975) 134 CLR 201, First Territory Senators' Case
- Western Australia v Commonwealth (1995) 183 CLR 373, Native Title Act case
