= Western Australia v Commonwealth (1975) =

- Court: High Court of Australia
- Full case name: Western Australia v Commonwealth; New South Wales v Commonwealth; Queensland v Commonwealth
- Argued: 21–23 May 1975
- Decided: 17 October 1975
- Citations: [1975] HCA 46, (1975) 134 CLR 201

Court membership
- Judges sitting: Barwick CJ, McTiernan, Gibbs, Stephen, Mason, Jacobs and Murphy JJ

Case opinions
- (7:0) The laws were validly passed using the procedure in s. 57 of the Constitution. (per curiam) (7:0) The question of compliance with s. 57 of the Constitution is justiciable. (per curiam) (4:3) The Senate (Representation of Territories) Act 1973 (Cth) was valid. (McTiernan, Mason, Jacobs and Murphy JJ; Barwick CJ, Gibbs and Stephen JJ dissenting)

Western Australia v Commonwealth, also known as the First Territory Senators' Case, was an important decision of the High Court of Australia concerning the procedure in section 57 of the Constitution and the representation of territories in the Senate. The Court unanimously held that legislation providing for the representation of the Northern Territory and the Australian Capital Territory in the Senate had been passed in accordance with section 57 of the Constitution and, by majority, that the representation of the territories was constitutionally valid.

== Background ==
=== Representation in the Senate ===
Section 7 of the Constitution provides for the composition of the Senate:

The Senate shall be composed of senators for each State, directly chosen by the people of the State, voting, until the Parliament otherwise provides, as one electorate.

Section 122 provides for the Commonwealth to make laws for any territory, including for the representation of the territories in Parliament:

The Parliament may make laws for the government of any territory surrendered by any State to and accepted by the Commonwealth, or of any territory placed by the Queen under the authority of and accepted by the Commonwealth, or otherwise acquired by the Commonwealth, and may allow the representation of such territory in either House of the Parliament to the extent and on the terms which it thinks fit.

Prior to the passage of the Senate (Representation of Territories) Act 1973, only the states had been represented in the Senate. The act provided for the Northern Territory and the Australian Capital Territory to each be represented by two senators. At the time, each state was represented by 10 senators.

=== Deadlocks between the Houses of Parliament ===
Section 57 of the Constitution provides the procedure for the breaking of deadlocks between the House of Representatives and the Senate:

If the House of Representatives passes any proposed law, and the Senate rejects or fails to pass it, or passes it with amendments to which the House of Representatives will not agree, and if after an interval of three months the House of Representatives, in the same or the next session, again passes the proposed law with or without any amendments which have been made, suggested, or agreed to by the Senate, and the Senate rejects or fails to pass it, or passes it with amendments to which the House of Representatives will not agree, the Governor-General may dissolve the Senate and the House of Representatives simultaneously. But such dissolution shall not take place within six months before the date of the expiry of the House of Representatives by effluxion of time.

If after such dissolution the House of Representatives again passes the proposed law, with or without any amendments which have been made, suggested, or agreed to by the Senate, and the Senate rejects or fails to pass it, or passes it with amendments to which the House of Representatives will not agree, the Governor-General may convene a joint sitting of the members of the Senate and of the House of Representatives.

The members present at the joint sitting may deliberate and shall vote together upon the proposed law as last proposed by the House of Representatives, and upon amendments, if any, which have been made therein by one House and not agreed to by the other, and any such amendments which are affirmed by an absolute majority of the total number of the members of the Senate and House of Representatives shall be taken to have been carried, and if the proposed law, with the amendments, if any, so carried is affirmed by an absolute majority of the total number of the members of the Senate and House of Representatives, it shall be taken to have been duly passed by both Houses of the Parliament, and shall be presented to the Governor-General for the Queen's assent.

=== Passage of the laws ===
During its first term in office, the Whitlam Government held a majority in the House of Representatives but not the Senate, which twice rejected 10 government bills. Amongst those bills, the Commonwealth Electoral Bill (No 2) 1973 was rejected for a second time on 29 August 1973, and the Representation Bill 1973 and the Senate (Representation of Territories) Bill 1973 were both rejected for a second time on 14 November 1973.

On 14 February 1974, the Governor-General, Sir Paul Hasluck, prorogued the Parliament until 28 February 1974. Subsequently, on 14 April 1974, the Governor-General dissolved both Houses, citing 6 bills which had been twice rejected by the Senate, including the Commonwealth Electoral Bill (No 2) 1973, the Representation Bill 1973, and the Senate (Representation of Territories) Bill 1973.

At the double dissolution election in May 1974, the Whitlam government was returned with a slightly reduced majority in the House of Representatives and still without a Senate majority. Following the Senate's further rejection of the bills used as justification for the double dissolution election, an historic joint sitting of the Commonwealth Parliament was convened in August 1974, at which all 6 of the rejected bills which had been cited for the double dissolution were passed.

The joint sitting had also passed another Act, the Petroleum and Minerals Authority Act 1973, which was successfully challenged in Victoria v Commonwealth on the basis that there had not been the required gap between the Senate's first and second rejections of that Act.

== Argument ==
The states of Western Australia and New South Wales challenged the validity of all 3 electoral Acts on the basis that they had not been passed in accordance with section 57. They also, along with the state of Queensland, challenged the validity of the Act providing for territory representation on the ground that the Constitution did not allow the Parliament to provide for full representation of the territories in the Senate.

The plaintiffs argued that the laws were not validly passed by the Parliament because the prorogation of Parliament and the passage of time between the Senate rejecting the laws for a second time and the proclamation dissolving the Parliament meant that the bills were not proposed law within the meaning of section 57, that the prorogation had precluded the exercise of the power to dissolve both Houses of Parliament and that the joint sitting was invalid because it had acted beyond power in considering the Petroleum and Minerals Authority Act 1973.

In relation to the representation of the territories, the plaintiffs argued that section 7 of the Constitution established the Senate as a States' House and that the representation envisaged by section 122 must be something less than full membership.

Four future High Court judges appeared as counsel in the case: Ronald Wilson, then the Solicitor-General for Western Australia, William Deane, for New South Wales, Michael McHugh, as junior counsel for the Commonwealth, and Daryl Dawson, then the Solicitor-General for Victoria.

== Decision ==
Each member of the Court delivered a separate opinion. The Court unanimously held that the laws had been validly passed in accordance with section 57 and by majority held that the Commonwealth could validly provide for full representation of the territories in the Senate.

=== Passage of the laws ===
All members of the Court, other than Barwick CJ, held that section 57 does not impose a requirement of undue delay between the second rejection of the proposed laws and the dissolution of Parliament by the Governor-General. Barwick CJ found that whilst there was a temporal limitation requiring the second rejection and the double dissolution to be related in time so as to form part of a current disagreement between the Houses, the lapse of time in this case was not sufficient to disqualify the bills from forming the basis for a double dissolution.

The entire Court also rejected the argument that the laws were invalid because the joint sitting had invalidly considered and passed the Petroleum and Minerals Authority Act 1973.

=== Representation of the territories ===
McTiernan, Mason, Jacobs and Murphy JJ upheld the validity of the act providing for senators from the Northern Territory and the Australian Capital Territory. They held that the words of section 122 must be given their full meaning and be read as an exception to section 7. Mason J held this in the following terms: ^{page 270.}

The apparent opposition which arises from the reference to representation of the territories in s 122 and the absence of any such reference in ss 7 and 24 is irreconcilable only if it be assumed that Ch I in making provision for the composition of the Senate and the House is necessarily speaking for all time. To my mind this assumption is misconceived. Sections 7 and 24 should be regarded as making provision for the composition of each House which nevertheless, in the shape of s 122, takes account of the prospective possibility that Parliament might deem it expedient, having regard to the stage which a territory might reach in the course of its future development, to give it representation in either House by allowing it to elect members of that House. To the framers of the Constitution in 1900 the existing condition of the territories was not such as to suggest the immediate likelihood of their securing representation in either House, but the possibility of such a development occurring in the future was undeniable. The prospect of its occurrence was foreseen and in my view it found expression in s 122.

The majority also rejected the argument that allowing for full territory representation in the Senate could permit the Commonwealth to 'swamp' the Senate with territory senators, effectively reducing the representation of the States. The majority said that the proper interpretation of the Constitution was not to be affected by the fear that a power might be abused.

Barwick CJ, Gibbs and Stephen JJ dissented. Each held that because section 7 referred only to the States, it was intended that the Senate would be a States' House and that the concept of representation envisaged by section 122 must be limited to less than full representation. Stephen J held in the following terms: ^{page 258.}

Such then being the constitutional structure of the Senate it is, to my mind, apparent that “representation” in s 122 must bear a meaning which accords with that structure. Such a meaning cannot extend to the creation of senators of Territories, taking their places in the Senate on an equal footing with senators of States nor indeed to the creation of any office carrying with it the power to affect by vote the deliberations of the Senate. To give to “representation” any such meaning is wholly to distort the intended character of the Senate as a chamber “composed of senators for each State”. It is this very type of distortion which the Senate (Representation of Territories) Act 1973 would, if valid, effect. I accordingly regard the Act as invalid; it is not authorized by the power conferred upon Parliament by s 122.

== Subsequent events ==
The first territory senators were elected at the 1975 election.

Following a change in the High Court's membership, McTiernan J retired in 1976 and was replaced by Aickin J, the representation of the territories was re-challenged in Queensland v Commonwealth (1977). The High Court again upheld the legislation, this time by an increased majority, with Mason, Jacobs and Murphy JJ affirming their earlier judgements, and Gibbs and Stephen JJ applying stare decisis to find that the legislation was constitutionally valid even though they considered the decision in Western Australia v Commonwealth to be wrong.
