= Victoria v Commonwealth =

Victoria v Commonwealth may refer to a number of High Court of Australia cases:

- Victoria v Commonwealth (1926) 38 CLR 399, the Federal Aid Roads Act case
- Victoria v Commonwealth (1937) 58 CLR 618, the Kakariki/Shipwrecks case
- Victoria v Commonwealth (1957) 99 CLR 575, the Second Uniform Tax case
- Victoria v Commonwealth (1971) 122 CLR 353, the Payroll Tax case
- Victoria v Commonwealth (1975) 134 CLR 81, the Petroleum and Minerals Authority Act case
- Victoria v Commonwealth (1975) 134 CLR 338, the Australian Assistance Plan case
- Victoria v Commonwealth (1996) 187 CLR 416, the Industrial Relations Act case
