= Queensland v Commonwealth =

Judgement of the High Court of Australia

- Court: High Court of Australia
- Argued: 4-6 May 1977
- Decided: 28 November 1977
- Citations: [1977] HCA 60, (1977) 139 CLR 585

Court membership
- Judges sitting: Barwick CJ, Gibbs, Stephen, Mason, Jacobs, Murphy and Aickin JJ

Case opinions
- (5:2) The Acts providing for territory representation in Parliament were valid. (per Gibbs, Stephen, Mason, Jacobs and Murphy JJ; Barwick CJ and Aickin J dissenting)

Queensland v Commonwealth, also known as the Second Territory Senators' Case, was an important decision of the High Court of Australia regarding the representation of territories in the Australian Parliament. The case involved a re-argument of the High Court's decision in Western Australia v Commonwealth (1975), in which the High Court had held legislation providing for Senate representation for the Northern Territory and the Australian Capital Territory to be constitutionally valid. The High Court again found the legislation to be constitutional and, additionally, that legislation providing for territory representation in the House of Representatives was also valid.

== Background ==
In 1974, the Whitlam government passed laws granting Senate representation to the Northern Territory and the Australian Capital Territory, as well as representation for the Australian Capital Territory in the House of Representatives. The Northern Territory had been represented in the lower chamber since 1922, with voting rights for its member since 1936.

In Western Australia v Commonwealth (1975), the High Court upheld the constitutional validity of the law for Senate representation. The decision was a divided one, with McTiernan, Mason, Jacobs and Murphy JJ upholding the law and Barwick CJ, Gibbs and Stephen JJ finding that the law was unconstitutional.

In 1976, a change occurred in the Court's membership, with McTiernan J resigning and being replaced by Aickin J. The State of Queensland, which had been a plaintiff in the 1975 case, again challenged the validity of the law allowing Senate representation. The State of Western Australia, which had also been a plaintiff in the 1975 case, brought an action challenging the constitutional validity of the laws providing for territory representation in the House of Representatives.

== Arguments ==
The plaintiff States argued that the 1975 case had been wrongly decided and should be overruled. The Commonwealth argued that 1975 case had been correctly decided or, if it was wrong, that stare decisis required that it be followed. It also argued that Queensland was estopped from raising the Senate representation case again and that the Court had no jurisdiction to decide the case because the Houses of Parliament had the power to exclusively determine their membership.

== Decision ==
Each member of the Court again wrote a separate opinion. The remaining members of the majority in the 1975 case - Mason, Jacobs and Murphy JJ - wrote opinions affirming their continued view of the correctness of their earlier judgments. ^{pages 606-12} Mason J further supported his conclusion by referring to the inclusion, earlier that year, of the territories in Constitutional referendum. ^{page 607}

Gibbs and Stephen JJ, who had been in the minority in the 1975 cases, re-stated their views that the laws for territory representation were invalid and that the earlier case had been wrongly decided. Although Gibbs J concluded that the Court was not bound by its previous decision and should be slow to apply stare decisis in Constitutional cases, he followed the decision in Western Australia v Commonwealth because the only relevant circumstance justifying a reconsideration of the earlier case had been a change in the Court's membership and that the legislation had been acted upon and Senators from the territories had been elected. ^{page 600} Stephen J found that the recency of the decision, the fact that it was a decision on which reasonable minds could differ and the impact upon the territories now that the law had been given effect, required the previous decision to be followed. ^{pages 603-4}

The effect of the decision was that although a majority of the Court considered the legislation to be unconstitutional, the laws were upheld by an increased majority compared to the 1975 case.
