= He Kaw Teh v The Queen =

Judgement of the High Court of Australia

- Court: High Court of Australia
- Decided: 17 April 1985
- Citations: [1985] HCA 43, (1985) 157 CLR 523

Court membership
- Judges sitting: Gibbs CJ, Mason, Wilson, Brennan and Dawson JJ

He Kaw Teh v R, is a landmark Australian judgment of the High Court. The matter related to intent and mens rea and the role of strict liability offences.

== Background ==
He Kaw Teh, the accused, was convicted of two offences under section 233B(1)(b) and (c) of the Customs Act 1901 (Cth) by possessing and importing 2.78 kg of heroin. At trial the court found that offences under these provisions were strict liability offences. The defendant maintained that he was unaware that he had the heroin in his possession (i.e. it was ‘planted’) and hence he should not be liable. He was convicted and sentenced to 20 years imprisonment.

== Finding ==
He Kaw Teh appealed his conviction to the High Court of Australia, who found for the appellant.

The court found, taking precedent from Sherras v De Rutzen (1895), that the prosecution needed to establish an intent in matters of significant criminality unless the presumption was rebutted.

Gibbs CJ found that “it is unlikely that the Parliament intended the consequences of committing an offence so serious should be visited on a person who had no intention to do anything wrong and no knowledge that he or she was doing so.”

Dawson J found similarly that “mistaken belief in facts which are inconsistent with the required intent does not have to be based upon reasonable grounds. Either the accused has a guilty mind or he does not, and if an honest belief, whether reasonable or not, points to the absence of the required intent, then the prosecution fails to prove its case.”

Brennan J held that where the offence is governed by statute, the requisite level of mens rea is established by interpreting the words of the statute and the intention of the legislation. When the statute is silent about the requisite mens rea, there is a presumption that the highest level of mens rea is required, that being ‘intention’. However, this presumption can be rebutted through interpretation of the legislation in question in the case.
