= Sir Harry Gibbs Legal Heritage Centre =

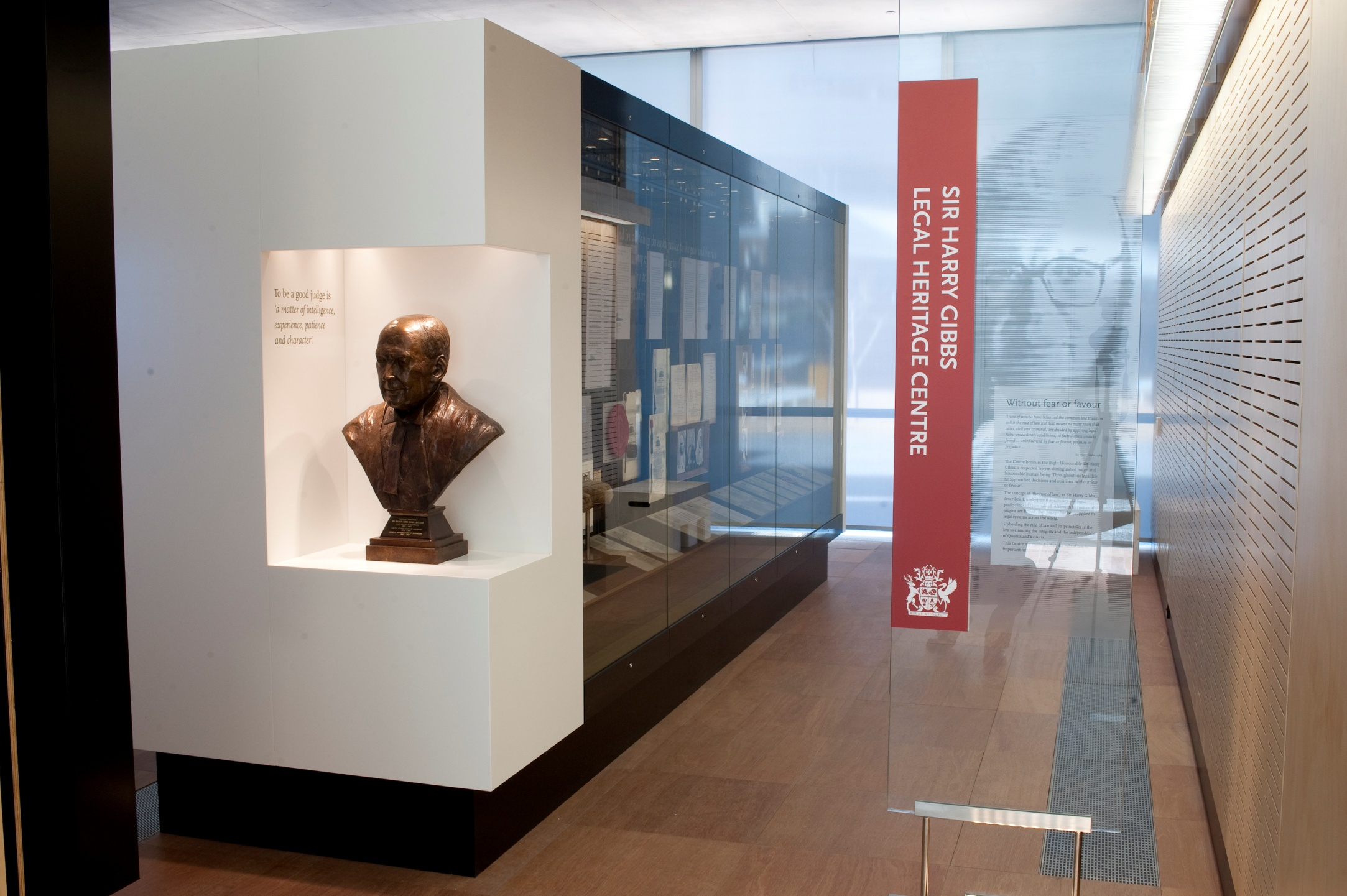
- Sir Harry Gibbs Legal Heritage Centre
- Established: 3 August 2012
- Location: 415 George Street, Brisbane, Australia
- Coordinates: 27.46760°S 153.02072°E
- Type: Legal History Museum

The Sir Harry Gibbs Legal Heritage Centre is located on the ground floor of the Queen Elizabeth II Courts of Law, Brisbane, Australia. It is Queensland's only dedicated legal heritage museum. The Centre is open 9 am - 5 pm, Monday to Friday. Admission is free.

== Background ==
The Centre is named after the late Right Honourable Sir Harry Gibbs GCMG AC KBE, the second Queenslander to serve as Chief Justice of the High Court of Australia (1981 to 1987) and former Chair of the Supreme Court of Queensland Library Committee (1963 to 1967). The museum is administered by the Supreme Court of Queensland Library under the auspices of the Supreme Court History and Publications Program. It was opened on 3 August 2012, in conjunction with the Queen Elizabeth II Courts of Law in Brisbane, and is the only legal heritage museum in Queensland.

The Centre was funded by a grant from the Incorporated Council of Law Reporting in the State of Queensland.

== Exhibitions ==
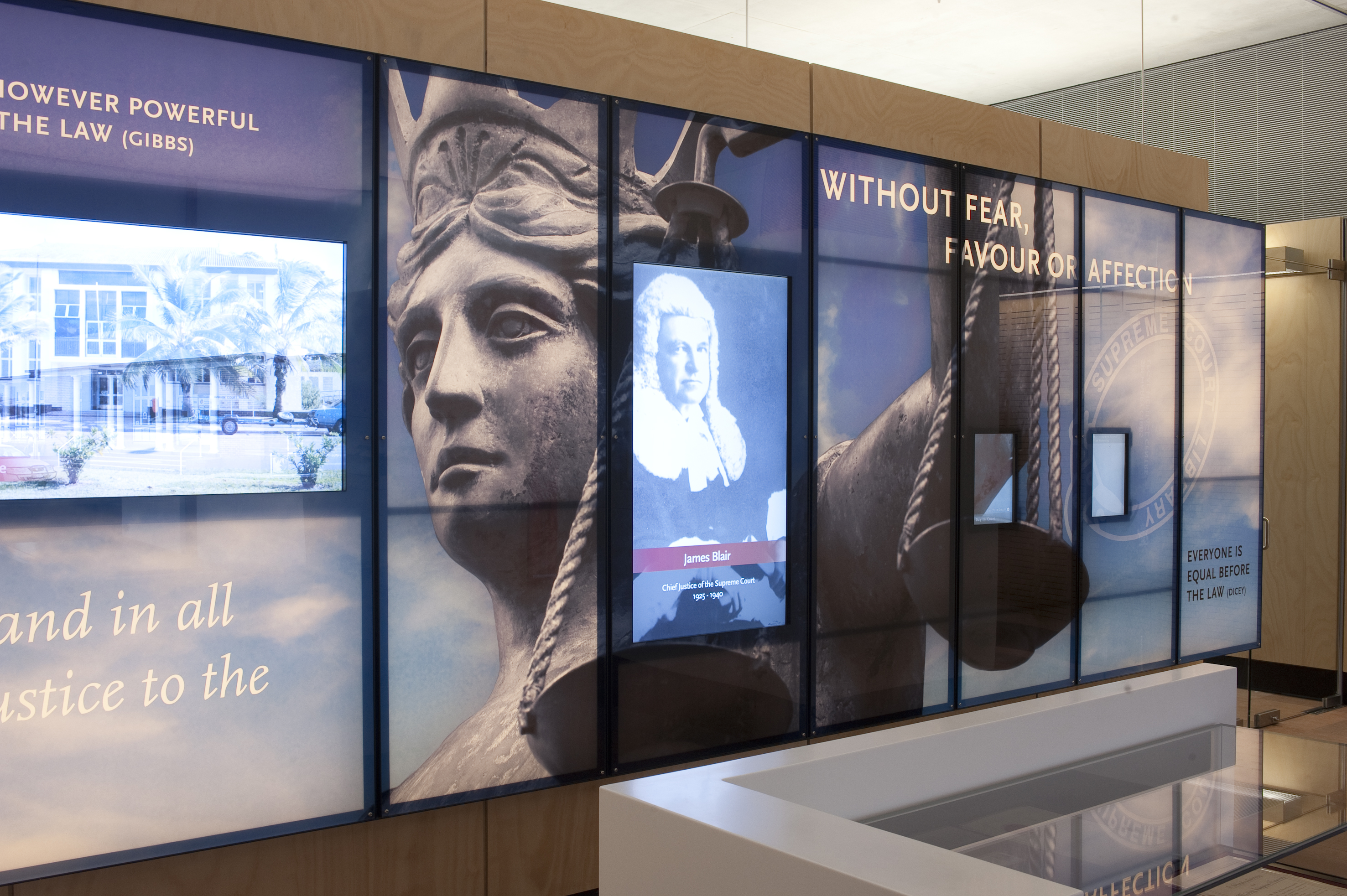
Matrix Wall, Sir Harry Gibbs Legal Heritage Centre

The Sir Harry Gibbs Legal Heritage Centre hosts themed exhibitions relating to Queensland’s legal history. In addition to legal heritage memorabilia, the museum-space features a matrix wall, digital displays, and a 2.4m interactive touch table.

=== Permanent Displays ===
The Centre features a permanent display of the life and legal career of Sir Harry Gibbs.

=== Current exhibitions ===
The current exhibition examines Queensland’s legal history from the establishment of its court system to the present day, with a focus on the legal principle of the Rule of Law.
