= Queen Elizabeth II Courts of Law =

Court building in Brisbane, Queensland

Queen Elizabeth II Courts of Law, Brisbane
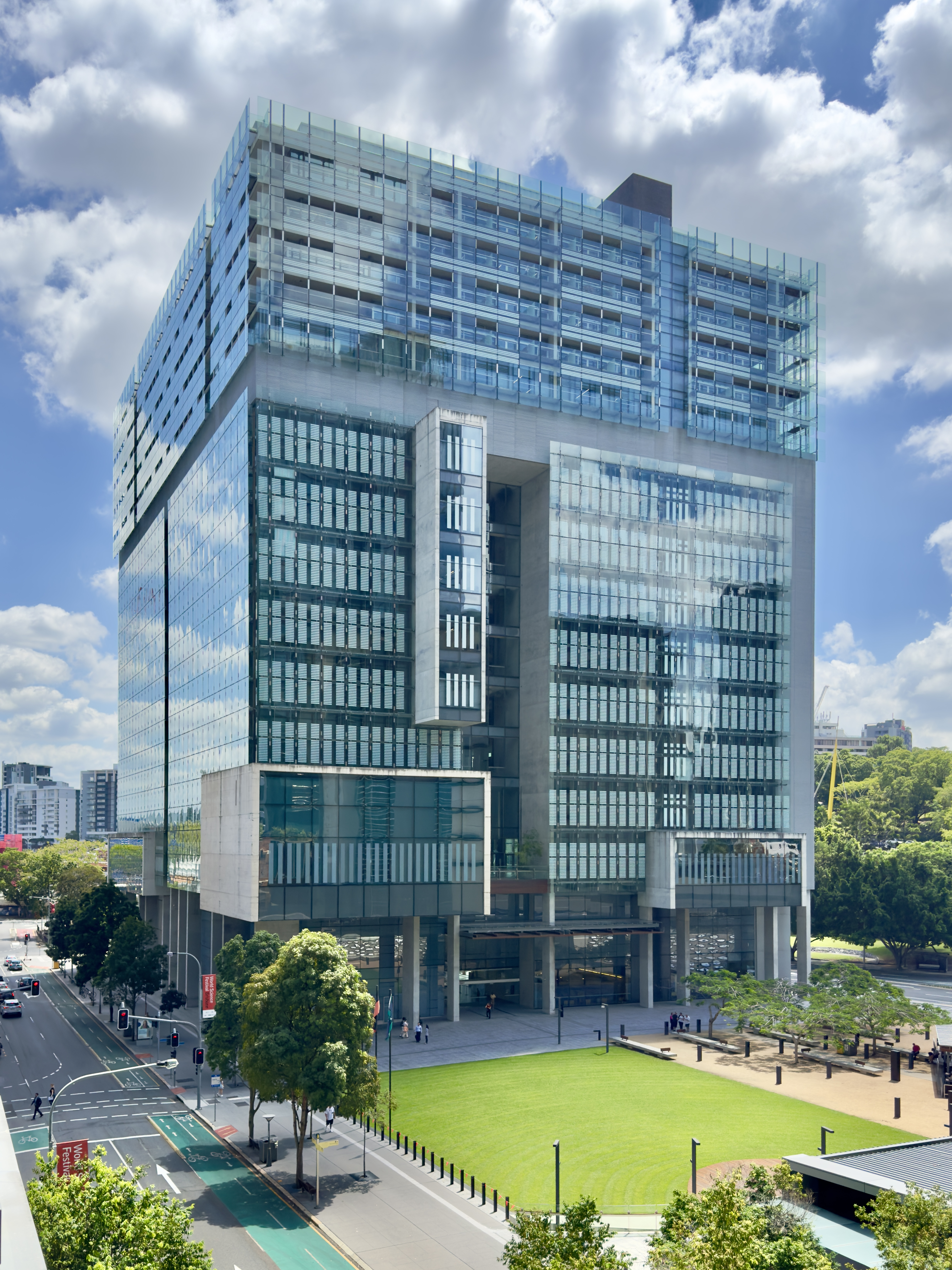
- Building facade overlooking the public square
- Interactive map of the Queen Elizabeth II Courts of Law, Brisbane area
- Alternative names: Brisbane Supreme and District Court

General information
- Location: Brisbane, Queensland, 415 George Street, Australia
- Coordinates: 27°28′4″S 153°1′14″E
- Current tenants: Supreme Court of Queensland; District Court of Queensland
- Construction started: 6 October 2008
- Opened: 27 August 2012
- Inaugurated: 3 August 2012
- Cost: A$570 million

Technical details
- Floor count: 19
- Floor area: 60,000 m^{2} (650,000 sq ft)

Design and construction
- Architecture firm: Architectus Brisbane and Guymer Bailey Architects
- Main contractor: Lend Lease

The Queen Elizabeth II Courts of Law, also referred to as the Brisbane Supreme and District Court, is a court building located at 415 George Street in Brisbane, Queensland, Australia.

== Location and features ==
Completed in 2012 as a purpose-built building for the Supreme Court of Queensland and the District Court of Queensland, the building together with the adjacent Brisbane Magistrates Court building created a legal precinct in Brisbane, which occupies an entire city block between George Street, Roma Street and Turbot Street. Both buildings are located near the Roma Street railway station and King George Square busway station.

The complex, shared between both courts, features enhanced facilities for victims of crime, witnesses, judges, lawyers and members of the public. It is one of the largest court buildings in Australia and includes 39 courtrooms, 1 large ceremonial court, Queensland Court of Appeal, 23 criminal courts and 14 civil courts, the Supreme Court Library, accommodation for 68 judges and a cell block in the basement. The foyer of the Supreme Court also hosts the Sir Harry Gibbs Legal Heritage Centre, a museum dedicated to Queensland's legal history.

The complex was named in the honour of Queen Elizabeth II to mark her Diamond Jubilee. It was officially opened by the premier of Queensland, Campbell Newman, on 3 August 2012 in presence of the governor of Queensland, Penelope Wensley, Chief Justice of Queensland Paul de Jersey, Chief Judge Patsy Wolfe, Attorney-General of Queensland Jarrod Bleijie, Master of the Rolls The Lord Neuberger of Abbotsbury, judge Lady Justice Hallett, Chief Justice of the Court of Final Appeal of Hong Kong Geoffrey Ma and Chief Justice of New Zealand Dame Sian Elias.

The court operations commenced on 27 August 2012.

== Gallery ==
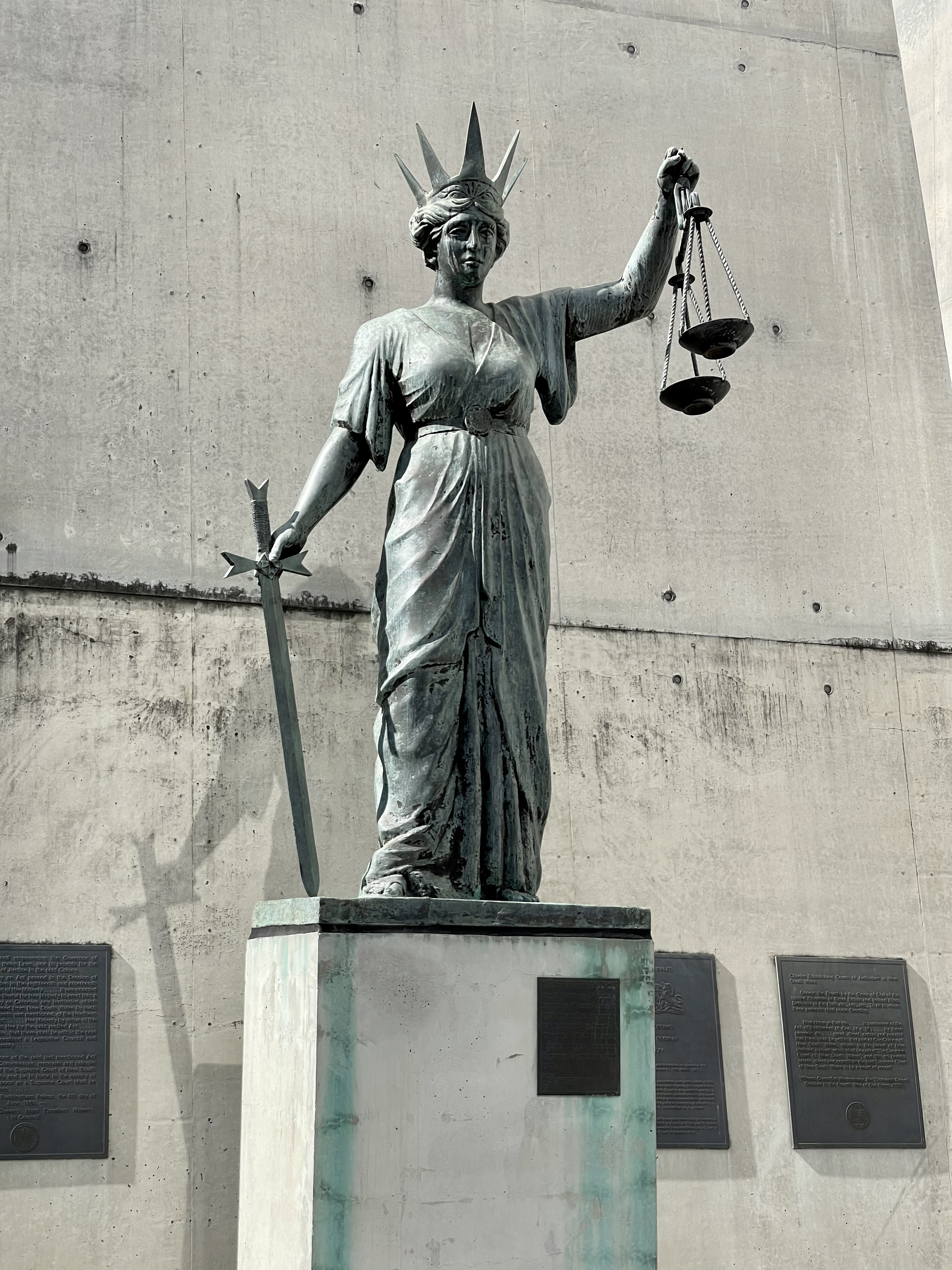
The statue of Themis, Greek goddess of justice, located outside the court

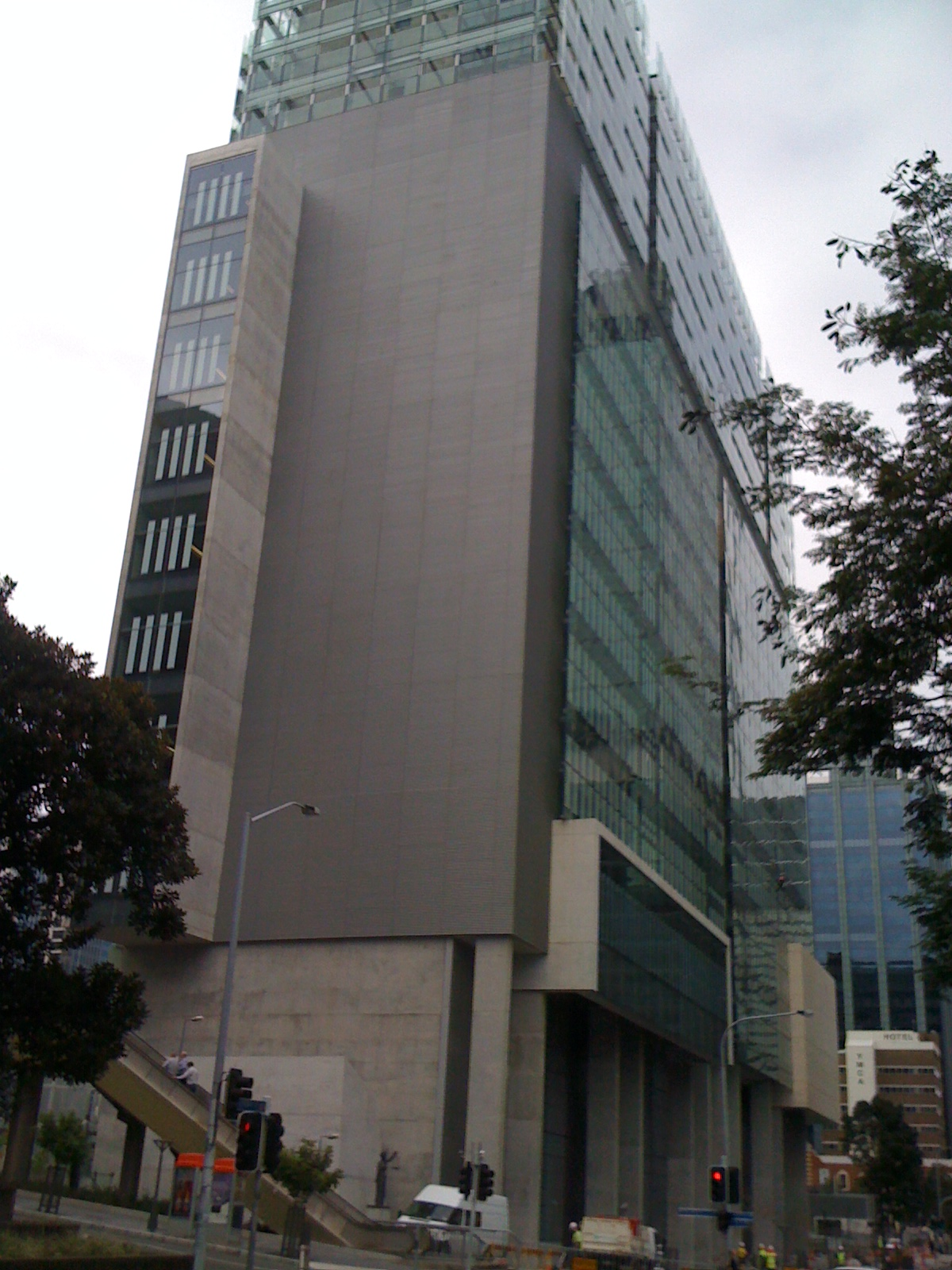
The Herschel Street facade of the new Law Courts Complex

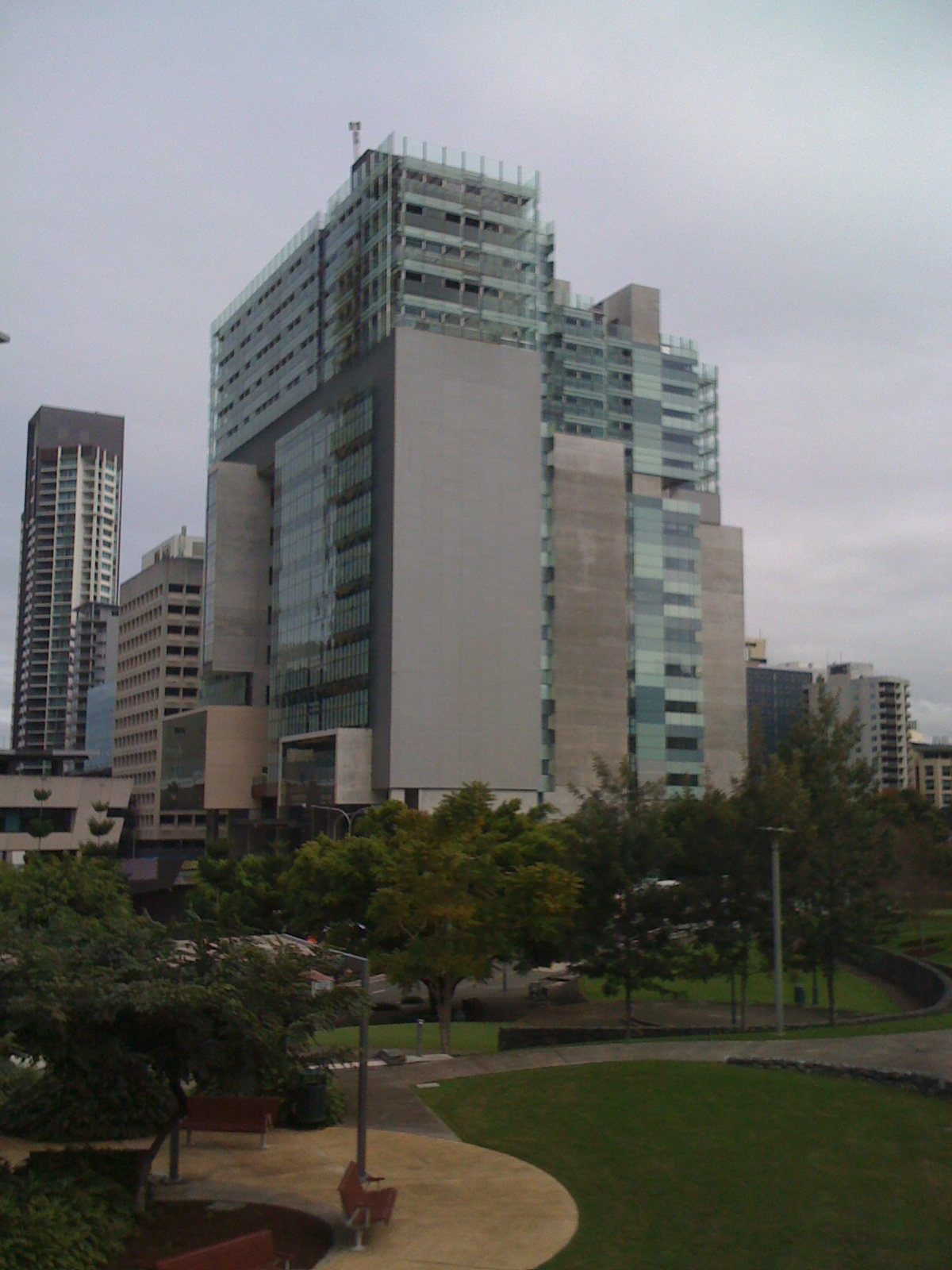
The Roma Street facade of the new Law Courts Complex

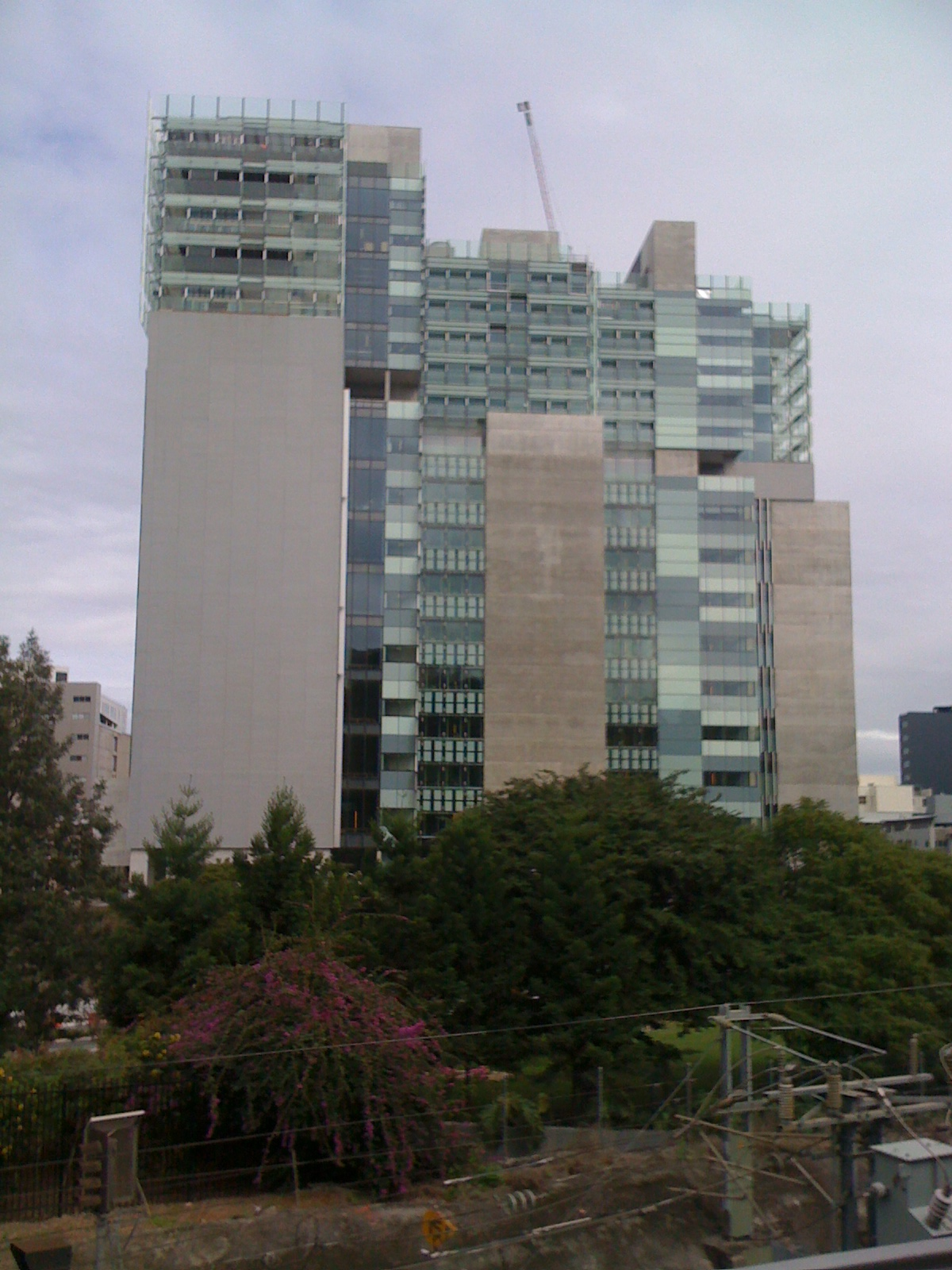
The Roma Street facade of the new Law Courts Complex

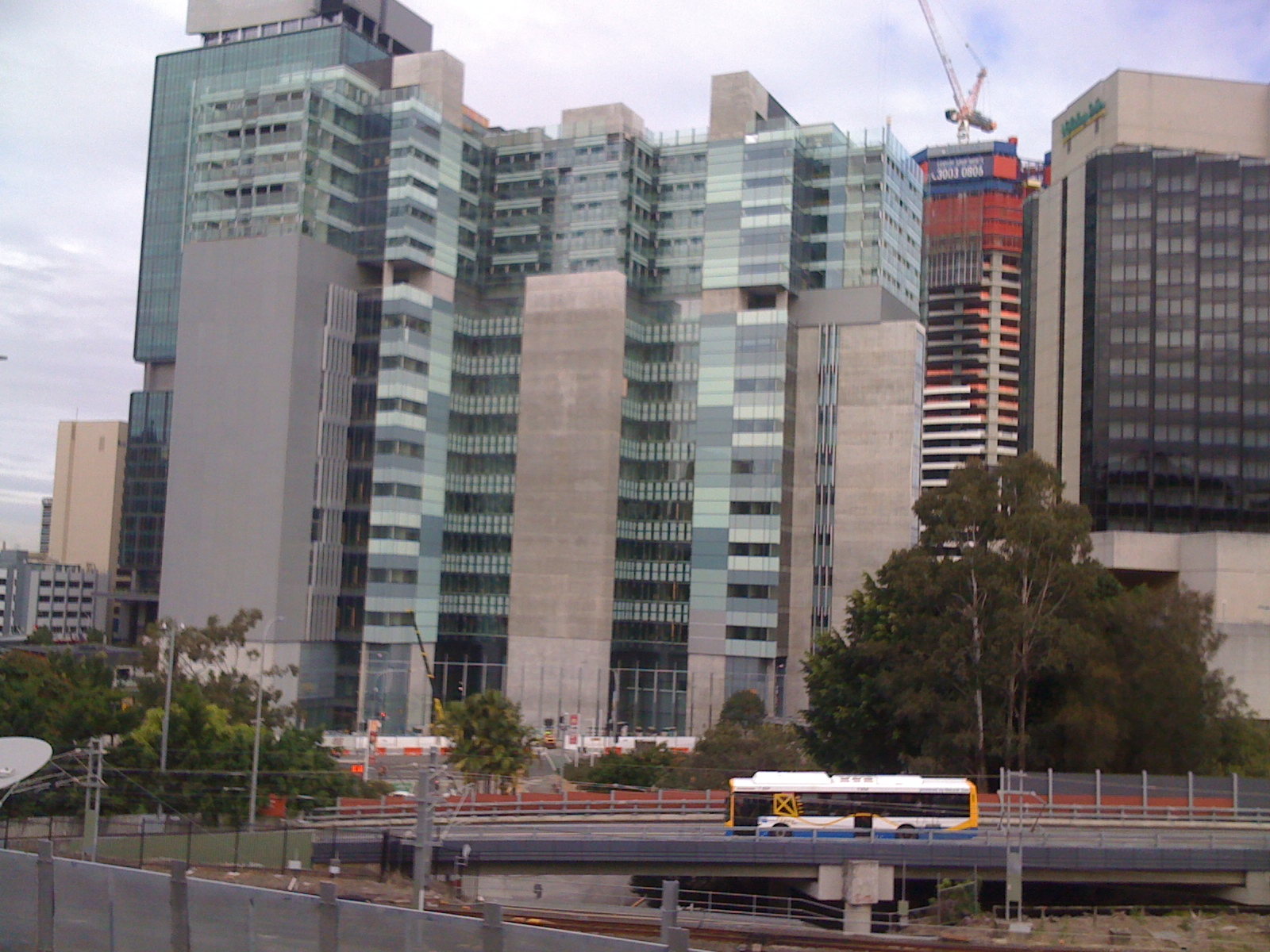
The Roma Street facade of the new Law Courts Complex
