= A Radical Tory =

1995 autobiography by Sir Garfield Barwick

A Radical Tory: Garfield Barwick's Reflections and Recollections
- Author: Sir Garfield Barwick
- Language: English
- Genre: Autobiography
- Publisher: Federation Press
- Publication date: 1995
- Publication place: Australia
- Media type: Print
- Pages: 330
- ISBN: 978-1-86287-236-3

A Radical Tory: Garfield Barwick's Reflections and Recollections (1995) is an autobiography of Sir Garfield Barwick. Barwick was the Attorney-General of Australia (1958–64), Minister for External Affairs (1961–64) and the seventh and longest serving Chief Justice of Australia (1964–81). He was appointed a judge of the International Court of Justice (1973–74).

The work is divided into four parts covering the various aspects of Barwick's life and career: "At the Bar", "Attorney-General", "Minister for External Affairs" and "Chief Justice".

== Critical reception ==
Reviewing the book in The Canberra Times Geoffrey McCarthy noted the worth of such works: "Perhaps the most absorbing feature of Barwick's account, and in my view its most striking, is his personal recounting of events which for most of us are pure history." He went on to conclude: "No doubt Sir Garfield will always have his detractors, but his place in Australian history is assured and his Reflections and Recollections give a valuable insight into the man and into the world in which he lived."
