= Garfield Barwick =

7th Chief Justice of Australia and politician (1903–1997)

The Right Honourable Sir Garfield Barwick AK GCMG PC QC
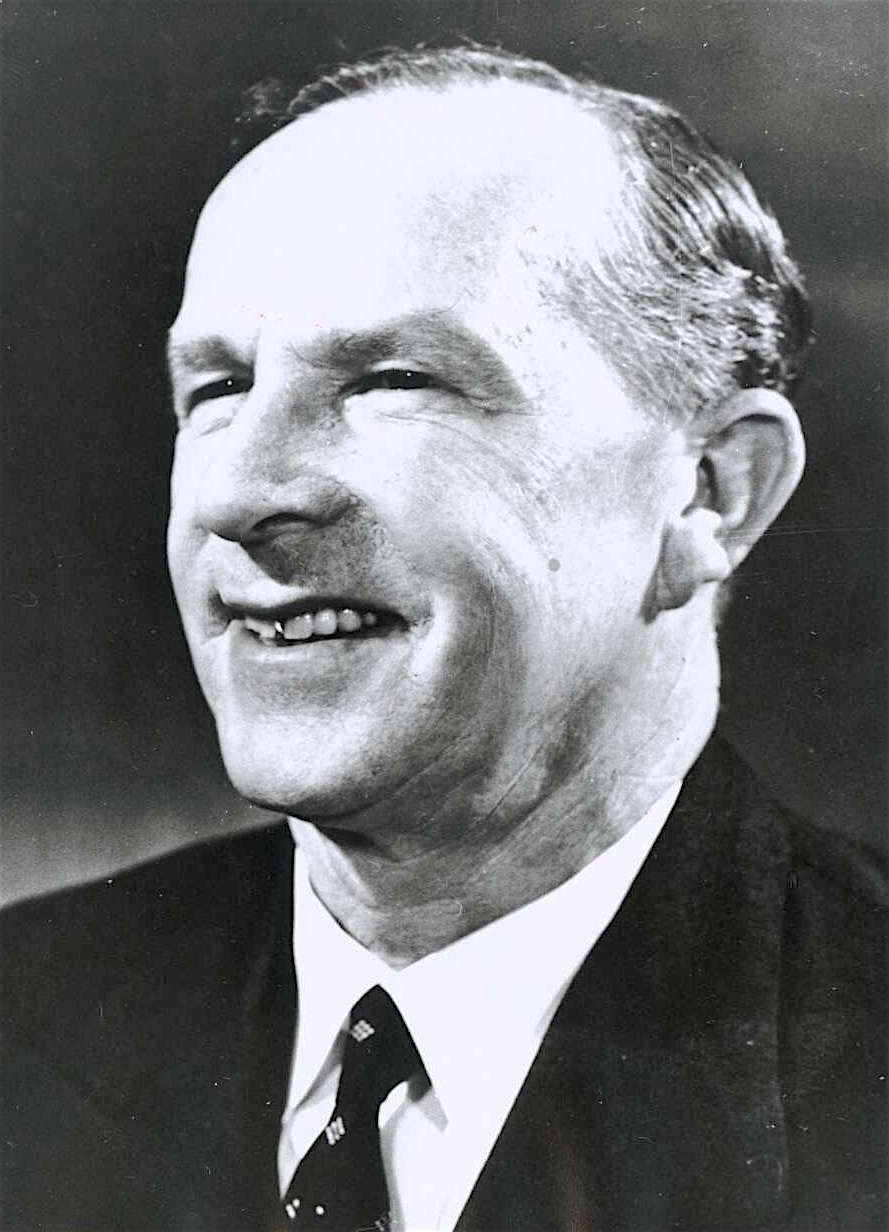
- Barwick in 1959

Chief Justice of Australia
- In office 27 April 1964 – 11 February 1981
- Nominated by: Sir Robert Menzies
- Appointed by: William Sidney, 1st Viscount De L'Isle
- Preceded by: Sir Owen Dixon
- Succeeded by: Sir Harry Gibbs

Attorney-General of Australia
- In office 12 October 1958 – 4 March 1964
- Prime Minister: Robert Menzies
- Preceded by: Neil O'Sullivan
- Succeeded by: Billy Snedden

Minister for External Affairs
- In office 22 December 1961 – 24 April 1964
- Prime Minister: Robert Menzies
- Preceded by: Robert Menzies
- Succeeded by: Paul Hasluck

Member of the Australian Parliament for Parramatta
- In office 8 March 1958 – 24 April 1964
- Preceded by: Howard Beale
- Succeeded by: Nigel Bowen

Personal details
- Born: 22 June 1903 Stanmore, New South Wales, Australia
- Died: 13 July 1997 (aged 94) North Turramurra, New South Wales, Australia
- Resting place: Northern Suburbs Memorial Gardens
- Party: Liberal
- Spouse: Norma Symons (m. 1929)
- Education: Fort Street High School
- Alma mater: University of Sydney

Sir Garfield Edward John Barwick (22 June 1903 – 13 July 1997) was an Australian judge who was the seventh and longest serving Chief Justice of Australia, in office from 1964 to 1981. He had earlier been a Liberal Party politician, serving as a minister in the Menzies government from 1958 to 1964.

Barwick was born in Sydney, and attended Fort Street High School before going on to study law at the University of Sydney. He was called to the bar in 1927 and became one of Australia's most prominent barristers, appearing in many high-profile cases and frequently before the High Court. He served terms as president of the NSW Bar Association and the Law Council of Australia. Barwick entered politics only at the age of 54, winning election to the House of Representatives at the 1958 Parramatta by-election. Prime Minister Robert Menzies made him Attorney-General by the end of the year, and in 1961 he was additionally made Minister for External Affairs.

In 1964, Menzies nominated Barwick as his choice to replace the retiring Owen Dixon as Chief Justice. Over the next 17 years, the Barwick court decided many significant constitutional cases, including a significant broadening of the corporations power and several cases regarding the constitutional basis of taxation. Barwick also played a small but significant role in the 1975 constitutional crisis, advising Governor-General John Kerr that it was within his powers to dismiss Prime Minister Gough Whitlam from office. He retired from the court at the age of 77, but remained a public figure until his death at the age of 94. Outside of his professional career, he also served as the inaugural president of the Australian Conservation Foundation.

== Early life and education ==
Barwick was born on 22 June 1903 in Stanmore, New South Wales. He was the first of three children born to Lily Grace (née Ellicott) and Jabez Edward Barwick. He was of Cornish descent, and was later very insistent on his Cornish identity.

Barwick was raised in "a Methodist family of modest means". His father was working as a typesetter and later established a horse racing newspaper, which collapsed in the mid-1920s. Barwick grew up in Sydney's inner suburbs, attending Crown Street Public School, Cleveland Street Intermediate High School and Fort Street High School. He matriculated at the age of 16, winning a bursary to attend the University of Sydney where he graduated Bachelor of Arts in 1923 and Bachelor of Laws in 1926. He won the University Medal in law.

== Legal career ==
A very diligent student, Barwick was admitted to legal practice soon after finishing university, although (on his own later admission) he suffered severely in financial terms during the Great Depression. He was guarantor for a bank loan to his younger brother to operate a service station in Ashfield, but was unable to repay the bank when the loan was forfeited, and was made bankrupt after he sued the oil companies for defamation. This was held against him by many throughout his career.

Nevertheless, he practised as a barrister from 1927 in many jurisdictions, achieving considerable recognition and the reluctant respect of opponents. At the beginning of World War 2, Barwick's challenges to the National Security Act 1939, which centralised the power to the Australian government, propelled him to the front rank of the Bar.

He became publicly prominent in the 1943 case over the artistic merits of William Dobell's Archibald Prize-winning portrait of the painter Joshua Smith; a losing entrant claimed the picture was caricature, not portraiture. Barwick represented the plaintiff, and although they lost, the judges commended him for the brilliance of his arguments and his name became well known from that point onwards.

Having been briefed in many of Australia's defining constitutional cases (e.g., the Airlines case, and the Bank Nationalisation case), he was knighted in 1953.

== Politics ==
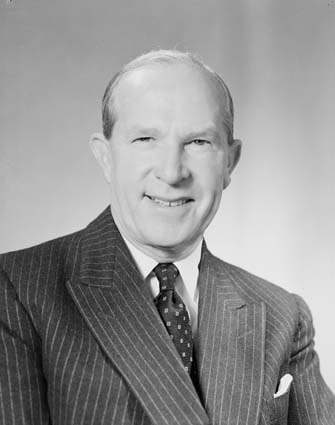
Barwick in 1962.

Barwick's family was supportive of the Australian Labor Party (ALP) and in the 1920s he initially supported Jack Lang's New South Wales state government. However, he was never a member of the ALP and "did not have an appetite for the rough-and-tumble of everyday politics".

In 1958, Barwick was personally recruited to the Liberal Party by Prime Minister Robert Menzies, in order to stand at the 1958 Parramatta by-election. He retained the seat for the Liberals and was re-elected at the 1958, 1961 and 1963 federal elections.

=== Attorney-General, 1958–1964 ===
On 10 December 1958, Barwick was appointed to cabinet as attorney-general of Australia, replacing the retiring Neil O'Sullivan. He had been a member of parliament for only nine months.

As attorney-general, Barwick guided through legislation amending the Matrimonial Causes Act and the Crimes Act, and established a model for restrictive trade practices legislation. He also gained public notice for his role in the case of an alleged Estonian war criminal, Ervin Viks, who had settled in Australia and was being pursued by the Soviet Union. Barwick refused to accept the USSR's extradition request, as there was no extradition treaty between the two countries; Viks had passed immigration screening processes and it was argued any such extradition would undermine Australian sovereignty.

=== External affairs minister, 1961–1964 ===
After the 1961 election, Barwick was additionally made Minister for External Affairs on 22 December 1961. He succeeded Menzies in the role and had previously acted in the position on several occasions.

Barwick was primarily focused on South-East Asia during his tenure as external affairs minister. During the final stages of the West New Guinea dispute, he was credited with persuading Menzies to recognise Indonesia's claim over Dutch New Guinea. He was also involved in Australia's response to the Indonesia–Malaysia confrontation and the initial commitment of Australian military advisors to South Vietnam, a precursor of Australian involvement in the Vietnam War.

=== Leadership speculation and retirement ===
For some time, Barwick was seen as a likely successor to Robert Menzies as Liberal leader and prime minister. When the news broke that he was entering parliament, Frank Browne confidently wrote:

For Harold Holt, it means no leadership. For the New South Wales Cabinet aspirants it means no Cabinet. All in all, to the Liberal Federal politicians, the entry of Sir Garfield Barwick means exactly what the acquisition of a Derby winner means to the other stallions in the stud. Prosperity in the stud, but the first step towards the boiling down of the other stallions.

However, Barwick struggled to adapt to the cut and thrust of political life. There were reports that he was reduced to tears by a vitriolic debate over what became the Crimes Act 1959, which he later confirmed had been accurate. In retirement, Menzies said that he "didn't understand parliament [...] he was a disappointing politician". An opinion poll in 1960 found that only three percent of the general public supported him as Menzies' replacement. He had little support from other Liberal MPs, and speculation about his leadership prospects was largely media-driven. Barwick's elevation to the High Court further "cleared the space" for Harold Holt, the deputy leader, and he eventually replaced Menzies as leader unopposed in 1966.

== Chief Justice ==
Barwick as Chief Justice

On 27 April 1964, Barwick was appointed Chief Justice of the High Court of Australia, succeeding Sir Owen Dixon, being the first law graduate from the University of Sydney to hold the position. He was instrumental in the construction of the High Court building in Canberra (unofficially known, as a result, as "Gar's Mahal"), and became the first president of the Australian Conservation Foundation in 1966.

Barwick was one of only eight justices of the High Court to have served in the Parliament of Australia prior to his appointment to the Court; the others were Edmund Barton, Richard O'Connor, Isaac Isaacs, H. B. Higgins, Edward McTiernan, John Latham, and Lionel Murphy.

In 1972, he became President of the Australian Institute for International Affairs. He was an ad hoc judge of the International Court of Justice in 1973–74 in the Nuclear Tests (Australia v. France) and Nuclear Tests (New Zealand v. France) cases, representing Australia and New Zealand jointly.

A significant decision of the Barwick court marked the beginning of the modern interpretation of the corporations power, which had been interpreted narrowly since 1909. The Concrete Pipes case (1971) established that the federal parliament could exercise the power to regulate at least the trading activities of corporations, whereas earlier interpretations had allowed only the regulation of conduct or transactions with the public.

The court decided many other significant constitutional cases, including the Seas and Submerged Lands case (1975), upholding legislation asserting sovereignty over the territorial sea; the First (1975) and Second (1977) Territory Senators cases, which concerned whether legislation allowing for the mainland territories to be represented in the Parliament of Australia was valid; and Russell v Russell (1976), which concerned the validity of the Family Law Act 1975. The court also decided several cases relating to the historic 1974 joint sitting of the Parliament of Australia, including Cormack v Cope (1974) and the Petroleum and Minerals Authority case (1975).

The Barwick court decided several cases on tax avoidance and tax evasion, almost always deciding against the taxation office. Led by Barwick himself in most judgments, the court distinguished between avoidance (legitimately minimising one's tax obligations) and evasion (illegally evading obligations). The decisions effectively nullified the anti-avoidance legislation and led to the proliferation of avoidance schemes in the 1970s, a result which drew much criticism upon the court.

During the 1975 Australian constitutional crisis, he controversially advised Governor-General Sir John Kerr on the constitutional legality of dismissing a prime minister who declined to advise an election when unable to obtain passage of supply. That was significant, because Barwick and Gough Whitlam, whose government Kerr dismissed, had a history of antipathy dating from the mid-1950s. Further, Whitlam had refused Kerr's request for permission to consult Barwick, or to act on any advice except his own.

The High Court was due to move to new premises in Canberra in May 1980. A year earlier, in anticipation of the move, Barwick wrote to Malcolm Fraser (who had become prime minister as a result of the dismissal and who was confirmed in office by the December 1975 election), seeking an official residence in the national capital. His request "went down like a lead balloon with the cabinet which had run into trouble with the High Court's burgeoning costs while urging economic restraint on other Australians", and was rejected. The $46.5 million High Court building in Canberra was opened by the Queen in May 1980, and is today still referred to as "Gar's Mahal".

Barwick retired from the bench in 1981, a few months after passing Sir John Latham's record as the longest-serving Chief Justice. He retained excellent health and continued to be active as a much-sought-after expert on legal issues until the end of his life. His writings included Sir John Did His Duty (a commentary on Kerr's dismissal of Whitlam) and his 1995 memoir A Radical Tory.

=== Privy Council ===
Barwick was appointed a Privy Counsellor in 1964 and sat as a member of the Judicial Committee of the Privy Council on dozens of occasions between 1966 and 1980, including in the rare instances where two Commonwealth judges sat and the even fewer occasions when two Commonwealth or Dominion Chief Justices were present. Barwick insisted before sitting on an amendment to Privy Council procedure to allow dissent but exercised that right on only a few occasions, being appeals from Malaysia (with Lord Guest) and New Zealand (as the sole dissentient). While Barwick mostly dealt with cases from other Commonwealth countries, he occasionally sat on appeals from Australian State courts.

Barwick supported the passage of the Privy Council (Limitation of Appeals) Act 1968, which closed off appeals from the High Court to the Judicial Committee of the Privy Council. He said that "Australia needed to make its own legal mistakes". However, it remained possible to appeal to the Privy Council from state supreme courts until the passage of the Australia Act 1986.

== Personal life ==
In 1929, Barwick married Norma Symons, with whom he had one son and one daughter. He was a cousin of Bob Ellicott, who also became federal attorney-general.

Barwick suffered from diabetes in his later years, with corresponding vision difficulties contributing to his decision to retire from the High Court. He was appointed patron of the National Council for the Blind in 1968 and president of the Royal Institute for Deaf and Blind Children in 1976, holding both roles until his death. The Garfield Barwick School in North Parramatta, a primary school for "oral" deaf children, was named in his honour.

Barwick died on 12 July 1997 in North Turramurra. He was cremated and his ashes interred at Northern Suburbs Memorial Gardens.

== Honours ==
In June 1953, he was made a Knight Bachelor, "in recognition of service to the Public service".

In January 1965, he was appointed a Knight Grand Cross of the Order of St Michael and St George (GCMG), honouring his contribution as Chief Justice of the High Court.

In June 1981, he was appointed a Knight of the Order of Australia (AK), "in recognition of service to the Australian Parliament, government and the law".

== Bibliography ==
- Sir Garfield Barwick (1995). A Radical Tory: Garfield Barwick's Reflections and Recollections. Federation Press. ISBN 978-1-86287-236-3.
- David Marr (1980). Barwick. Allen & Unwin. ISBN 978-0-86861-058-0.
- Tom Frame (2005). The Life and Death of Harold Holt. Allen & Unwin. p. 122.
- Oliver Jones (2020). A secret interview with Sir Garfield Barwick. 49 Australian Bar Review 375. ISSN 0814-8589.
- Oliver Jones (2026). The History of the Judicial Committee (Dissenting Opinions) Order 1966. 142 Law Quarterly Review 85. ISSN 0023-933X.
- Woodard, Garry (2003). "'A Radical Tory': Sir Garfield Barwick, 1961–64". In Beaumont, Joan (ed.). Ministers, Mandarins and Diplomats: Australian Foreign Policy Making, 1941-1969. Melbourne University Press. ISBN 9780522850475.

Legal offices
| Preceded by Sir Owen Dixon | Chief Justice of Australia; 1964–1981 | Succeeded by Sir Harry Gibbs |
Political offices
| Preceded by Neil O'Sullivan | Attorney-General of Australia; 1958–1964 | Succeeded by Billy Snedden |
| Preceded by Robert Menzies | Minister for External Affairs; 1961–1964 | Succeeded by Paul Hasluck |
Parliament of Australia
| Preceded by Howard Beale | Member for Parramatta; 1958–1964 | Succeeded by Nigel Bowen |
Academic offices
| New title | Chancellor of Macquarie University; 1967 – 1978 | Succeeded by Percy Partridge |
