= Victoria v Commonwealth (September 1975) =

- Court: High Court of Australia
- Full case name: State of Victoria and Ors v Commonwealth of Australia and Ors
- Argued: 24–27 February 1975; 24 June 1975
- Decided: 30 September 1975
- Citations: [1975] HCA 39, (1975) 134 CLR 81

Court membership
- Judges sitting: Barwick CJ, McTiernan, Gibbs, Stephen, Mason and Jacobs JJ

Case opinions
- (4:2) The Petroleum and Minerals Authority Act 1973 (Cth) was invalid at it did not meet the requirements of a proposed law in s. 57 of the Constitution. (per Barwick CJ, Gibbs, Stephen and Mason JJ; McTiernan and Jacobs JJ dissenting)

Victoria v Commonwealth was an important decision of the High Court of Australia concerning the procedures in section 57 of the Constitution. The decision was one of several by the High Court following the 1974 joint sitting of the Australian Parliament. The High Court held, by majority, that one of the laws passed at the joint sitting - the Petroleum and Minerals Authority Act 1973 - was not valid because the required time had not elapsed between the Senate's first rejection of the law and its being passed a second time by the House of Representatives.

== Background ==
Section 57 of the Constitution provides the procedure for the breaking of deadlocks between the House of Representatives and the Senate:

If the House of Representatives passes any proposed law, and the Senate rejects or fails to pass it, or passes it with amendments to which the House of Representatives will not agree, and if after an interval of three months the House of Representatives, in the same or the next session, again passes the proposed law with or without any amendments which have been made, suggested, or agreed to by the Senate, and the Senate rejects or fails to pass it, or passes it with amendments to which the House of Representatives will not agree, the Governor-General may dissolve the Senate and the House of Representatives simultaneously. But such dissolution shall not take place within six months before the date of the expiry of the House of Representatives by effluxion of time.

If after such dissolution the House of Representatives again passes the proposed law, with or without any amendments which have been made, suggested, or agreed to by the Senate, and the Senate rejects or fails to pass it, or passes it with amendments to which the House of Representatives will not agree, the Governor-General may convene a joint sitting of the members of the Senate and of the House of Representatives.

The members present at the joint sitting may deliberate and shall vote together upon the proposed law as last proposed by the House of Representatives, and upon amendments, if any, which have been made therein by one House and not agreed to by the other, and any such amendments which are affirmed by an absolute majority of the total number of the members of the Senate and House of Representatives shall be taken to have been carried, and if the proposed law, with the amendments, if any, so carried is affirmed by an absolute majority of the total number of the members of the Senate and House of Representatives, it shall be taken to have been duly passed by both Houses of the Parliament, and shall be presented to the Governor-General for the Queen's assent.

During its first term in office, the Whitlam government held a majority in the House of Representatives but not the Senate, which twice rejected 10 government bills. On 13 December 1973, the Petroleum and Minerals Authority Bill was passed by the House of Representatives and transmitted to the Senate. The government moved a motion to suspend the Standing Orders to allow the Bill to proceed to passage "without delay". The Senate did not pass the motion and instead adjourned debate to later in the day. One the resumption of debate, the Senate resolved to adjourn the debate to the next sitting day. The Senate then adjourned to a date to be fixed which, in due course, became 28 February 1974.

On 14 February 1974, the Governor-General, Sir Paul Hasluck, prorogued the Parliament until 28 February 1974. Pursuant to the Senate's standing orders, all bills lapsed as a result of the prorogation, subject to the Senate resolving to take up the bill once more.

On 7 March 1974, the House of Representatives resolved to send a request to the Senate to resume reconsideration of the Bill. The Senate resumed consideration of the Bill on 19 March 1974 and ultimately rejected it on 2 April 1974.

On 8 April 1974, the House of Representatives again passed the Bill. On 10 April 1974, the Senate adjourned debate on the Bill for 6 months.

On 14 April 1974, the Governor-General dissolved both Houses, citing 6 bills which had been twice rejected by the Senate, including the Petroleum and Minerals Authority Bill. At the double dissolution election in May 1974, the Whitlam government was returned with a slightly reduced majority in the House of Representatives and still without a Senate majority. Following the Senate's further rejection of the bills used as justification for the double dissolution election, an historic joint sitting of the Commonwealth Parliament was convened in August 1974, at which all 6 of the rejected bills which had been cited for the double dissolution were passed.

== Argument ==
The states of Victoria, New South Wales, Queensland and Western Australia commenced proceedings challenging the validity of the Act. They argued that the Bill had been first rejected by the Senate on 2 April 1974 and that, as a result, the required 3 months had not passed before its second passage by the House of Representatives. Therefore, it was argued, the Bill was not one to which section 57 of the Constitution could apply.

The Commonwealth made several arguments in defence of the validity of the Act:

1. that the adjournment of debate on 13 December 1973 was a rejection or failure to pass the law;
2. that in determining whether the law was rejected or not passed, regard could be had to statements by Opposition senators about their intention to oppose the law;
3. the interval of 3 months referred to in section 57 is calculated from the first passing of the law by the House of Representatives;
4. the provisions of section 57 are merely directory, not mandatory;
5. the issues are non-justiciable.

== Decision ==
All members of the Court wrote separate opinions. All members, other than Justice McTiernan, concluded that the Court had jurisdiction. By majority, the Court held that the Act was invalid as it had not met the requirements of section 57 and so should not have been considered and passed at the joint sitting.

=== Majority ===
Chief Justice Barwick and Justices Gibbs, Stephen and Mason held the Act to be invalid. They rejected the Commonwealth's contention that the Senate had failed to pass the Bill when it adjourned on 13 December 1973. Barwick CJ held that the Senate will have failed to pass a bill where the time has come for it to "take a stand with respect to the Bill" and it "merely prevaricates". He concluded that such time had not been reached on 13 December 1973. Justice Gibbs held that section 57 permitted the Senate a "reasonable time" to consider a bill transmitted by the House of Representatives and that it was "impossible to hold" that the Senate had failed to pass the Act on 13 December 1973. Justice Stephen held that the Senate would not have failed to pass a bill as long as it was engaged in the normal process of deliberation upon proposed laws and the deliberative process was not being used for the ulterior purpose of delaying, rather than considering, the proposed law. Justice Mason also held the test to be one of reasonable time for the Senate to consider the law.

=== Dissent ===
Justices McTiernan and Jacobs dissented. Justice McTiernan held that the question of whether a law met the requirements of section 57 was a political question which could not be decided by the High Court. Justice Jacobs considered the controversy to be justiciable and held that section 57 gives to the Senate a period of 3 months in which to pass the proposed law and, if it has not done so, then it has "failed to pass the law" with the period of 3 months to be calculated from when it was first open to the Senate to consider the law.
