= Harry Gibbs =

Australian judge

The Right Honourable Sir Harry Gibbs AC GCMG KBE PC QC

Chief Justice of Australia
- In office 12 February 1981 – 5 February 1987
- Nominated by: Malcolm Fraser
- Appointed by: Zelman Cowen
- Preceded by: Sir Garfield Barwick
- Succeeded by: Sir Anthony Mason

Justice of the High Court of Australia
- In office 4 August 1970 – 12 February 1981
- Appointed by: John Gorton
- Preceded by: Sir Frank Kitto
- Succeeded by: Sir Gerard Brennan

Personal details
- Born: 7 February 1917 Sydney, Australia
- Died: 25 June 2005 (aged 88) Sydney, Australia
- Relations: Wylie Gibbs (brother)

Sir Harry Talbot Gibbs (7 February 1917 – 25 June 2005) was Chief Justice of the High Court of Australia from 1981 to 1987 after serving as a member of the High Court between 1970 and 1981. He was known as one of Australia's leading federalist judges although he presided over the High Court when decisions such as Koowarta v Bjelke-Petersen in 1982 and Commonwealth v Tasmania expanded the powers of the Commonwealth at the expense of the states. Gibbs dissented from the majority verdict in both cases. On 3 August 2012, the Supreme Court of Queensland Library opened the Sir Harry Gibbs Legal Heritage Centre. It is the only legal heritage museum of its kind in Queensland and features a permanent exhibition dedicated to the life and legacy of Sir Harry Gibbs.

== Early career (1917–1970) ==
Harry Talbot Gibbs was educated at the Ipswich Grammar School and later at Emmanuel College at the University of Queensland, where he was President of the University of Queensland Union. He graduated from the latter with a Bachelor of Arts with honours in 1937 and a Bachelor of Laws in 1939. The same year he was admitted to the bar, but his legal career was interrupted by World War II and he served in the Australian Military Forces from 1942 to 1945 and in the Second Australian Imperial Force in Papua New Guinea, attaining the rank of Captain. He married Muriel Dunn in 1944 and the couple had three daughters and a son (Barbara, Mary, Margaret and Harry). His younger brother Wylie Gibbs was a federal Liberal MP in the 1960s.

While stationed in Papua New Guinea, Gibbs developed an interest in its legal system and was awarded a Master of Laws based on his research. He returned to the practice of law following the war and was appointed Queen's Counsel in 1957, while also lecturing in law at the University of Queensland.

Gibbs served as a judge on the Supreme Court of Queensland from 8 June 1961 until 24 June 1967. He was the first law graduate of the University of Queensland to join that Court. In 1963, Gibbs was appointed Chair of the Supreme Court of Queensland Library Committee and held the position until 1967.

In 1967 Gibbs was appointed to the Federal Court of Bankruptcy and the ACT Supreme Court. He was appointed as a judge at a relatively early age of 44 due to his reputation at the bar.

=== National Hotel Royal Commission ===
During his service, he was appointed as a Royal Commissioner in the National Hotel Royal Commission following allegations that the hotel was the centre of a network of vice including a call girl ring with support of senior members of the Queensland Police Force. Gibbs concluded that the allegations were not correct. The subsequent Fitzgerald Inquiry showed that corruption was in fact widespread and systematic.

Critics such as Evan Whitton and Richard Ackland claim that Gibbs inappropriately followed the hearsay rules, excluding a great deal of evidence despite the fact that Royal Commissioners are not bound to follow such rules.

== High Court Justice (1970–1981) ==
In 1970, Gibbs joined the High Court of Australia replacing Sir Frank Kitto. During his early years on the Court, there was high turnover of judges, with Sir Victor Windeyer retiring in 1972, Sir William Owen dying in 1972, Sir Cyril Walsh dying in 1973 and Sir Douglas Menzies dying in 1974. As a result of this high turnover, Gibbs rapidly became second in seniority behind Sir Garfield Barwick.

Gibbs' first significant case was Strickland v Rocla Concrete Pipes Ltd in 1971, a landmark trade practices case which significantly expanded the powers of the Commonwealth under section 51(xx) of the Constitution, the corporations power. He was in the minority.

In the Curran case decided in 1974, Gibbs was part of the majority ruling in favour of the legality of a tax minimisation scheme. As a result of the proliferation of similar schemes, John Howard as Treasurer introduced retrospective legislation which was subsequently passed by the parliament.

The AAP Case in 1975, examined the nature of the appropriations power in section 81 of the Constitution and the incidental power in section 51(xxxix) of the Constitution. The Appropriation Act (Number 1) provided for certain sums to be appropriated to the Australian Assistance Plan to enable grants to be made to Regional Councils for Social Development. The Victorian Government disputed the powers of the Commonwealth to legislate for such purposes. In his dissenting judgement, Justice Gibbs held that the words of Section 61 "make it clear that the Executive cannot act in respect of a matter which falls entirely outside the legislative competence of the Commonwealth".

Gibbs was part of a 6:1 majority in the DOGS Case in 1981, which found that the Commonwealth could provide financial assistance to non-Government schools.

== Chief Justice of the High Court (1981–1987) ==
In 1981, Gibbs was appointed Chief Justice after the retirement of Sir Garfield Barwick. The first notable case to come before his court was Koowarta v Bjelke-Petersen, decided in 1982. This case upheld the Racial Discrimination Act 1975 with a majority of the Court finding that the external affairs power allowed the Commonwealth to pass such legislation as a consequence of Australia's obligations under the Convention on the Elimination of All Forms of Racial Discrimination. Gibbs dissented, finding that the Commonwealth might have such powers only in relationships with other nations and only if the treaty arranged with other nations was "international in character".

The external affairs power was expanded further in the case of Commonwealth v Tasmania in 1983 known as the Tasmanian Dams case. The High Court upheld the World Heritage Properties Conservation Act 1983 passed by the Commonwealth Parliament to stop the Government of Tasmania from building a dam on the Franklin River which had been nominated for World Heritage Site status. The majority of the court found that the external affairs power enabled the Commonwealth Parliament to pass such legislation under the Convention Concerning the Protection of the World Cultural and Natural Heritage. Gibbs again dissented, finding that the use of the external affairs power should be limited by the status of Australia as a federation and if the Commonwealth was granted too much power under section 51 of the Australian Constitution, it would upset the "Federal balance".

The latter part of Gibbs' tenure as Chief Justice was dominated by allegations of impropriety against Lionel Murphy, a fellow justice of the High Court. The Age newspaper published transcriptions of conversations between Murphy and NSW solicitor Morgan Ryan, alleging an improper relationship between the two men in February 1984. Two Senate Committees were established to look into the matter along with the Stewart Royal Commission in NSW to look into the tapes. A lengthy court case ensued resulting in Murphy's acquittal.

When the Stewart Royal Commission published a secret volume of conversations between Murphy and Ryan, Gibbs insisted on reading the Royal Commission Report and advised Lionel Bowen, the Commonwealth Attorney-General, that some justices intended making public their reluctance to sit with Murphy in 1986.

Lionel Bowen set up a Parliamentary Commission of Inquiry consisting of three retired judges in 1986 to inquire into the claims. However, this commission was soon abandoned as Murphy advised that he had inoperable cancer. Against Gibbs' strong advice, Murphy sat for a week as a Justice before his death in 1986.

Gibbs left the High Court of Australia upon reaching the mandatory retirement age of 70. He was widely regarded as a healer after Sir Garfield Barwick's controversial stint as Chief Justice. He also had an international reputation, with Lord Denning stating "I would rank him as one of the greatest of your chief justices, rivalling even Sir Owen Dixon."

== Retirement (1987–2005) ==
After his retirement from the High Court, Gibbs continued to serve in several important roles. In 1987 he was 'Judge-in-Residence' at the University of Queensland. He was the Chairman of the Parliamentary Judges Commission in 1989 resulting from the removal of Justice Angelo Vasta from the Queensland Supreme Court. He was vice-president of the Kiribati Court of Appeal between 1988 and 1999 and the Review of Commonwealth Criminal Law between 1987 and 1991. As well, he chaired the Inquiry into Community Needs and High Voltage Transmission Development Commission.

In the early 1990s Gibbs was intimately involved with the foundation of Australians for Constitutional Monarchy (ACM), an organisation whose aim is to defend Australia's constitutional monarchy. As a founder of the movement he was both a signatory of the ACM charter and a member of its Foundation Council. His beliefs about the role of The Crown in Australian society saw him campaign for the NO case in the 1999 constitutional referendum.

Gibbs' activism in this area was not limited to the ACM. In 1992 he accepted the role of President of the Samuel Griffith Society. Here he set the tone of the society when he presented a paper entitled "Re-Writing the Constitution".

Gibbs' death was announced only after his cremation had taken place, in Sydney on 28 June 2005. At his funeral the eulogy was delivered by his former Associate, David Jackson QC. He had, before his death, forbidden the convening of a state funeral in his honour.

== Honours ==
Harry Gibbs was knighted as a Knight Commander of the Order of the British Empire (KBE) on 22 September 1970.

In 1972, he was made a Privy Counsellor and sat on the Judicial Committee of the Privy Council thirteen times.

On 3 April 1981, he was made a Knight Grand Cross of the Order of St Michael and St George (GCMG).

In the Queen's Birthday Honours of 1987, he was appointed a Companion of the Order of Australia (AC).

== See also ==
- University of Queensland Union
- Sir Harry Gibbs Legal Heritage Centre
- Commonwealth Law Courts

Legal offices
Preceded by Sir Garfield Barwick	Chief Justice of Australia; 1981–1987	Succeeded by Sir Anthony Mason
