= Electoral results for the Division of Dobell =

Australian division election results

This is a list of electoral results for the Division of Dobell in Australian federal elections from the electorate's creation in 1984 until the present.

== Members ==
Member	Party	Term
Michael Lee	Labor	1984–2001
Ken Ticehurst	Liberal	2001–2007
Craig Thomson	Labor	2007–2012
Craig Thomson	Independent	2012–2013
Karen McNamara	Liberal	2013–2016
Emma McBride	Labor	2016–present

== Election results ==
=== Elections in the 2020s ===
==== 2025 ====
2025 Australian federal election: Dobell
Party	Candidate	Votes	%	±%
Greens	Simon George Cooper			
Liberal	Brendan Small			
One Nation	Martin Stevenson			
Trumpet of Patriots	Anthony Tawaf			
Legalise Cannabis	Tim Claydon			
Animal Justice	Patrick Murphy			
Libertarian	Isaac Chalik			
Labor	Emma McBride			
Total formal votes				
Informal votes				
Turnout				

==== 2022 ====
2022 Australian federal election: Dobell
Party	Candidate	Votes	%	±%
Labor	Emma McBride	43,595	42.86	+1.37
Liberal	Michael Feneley	34,276	33.70	−7.03
Greens	Cath Connor	8,700	8.55	+1.08
One Nation	Martin Stevenson	7,583	7.45	+7.45
United Australia	Dean Mackin	3,818	3.75	−1.58
Fusion	Geoff Barnes	2,202	2.16	+2.16
Liberal Democrats	Eliot Metherell	1,543	1.52	+1.52
Total formal votes		101,717	95.38	+1.35
Informal votes		4,930	4.62	−1.35
Turnout		106,647	90.07	−1.98
Two-party-preferred result
Labor	Emma McBride	57,491	56.52	+5.02
Liberal	Michael Feneley	44,226	43.48	−5.02
Labor hold		Swing	+5.02	

Alluvial diagram for preference flows in the seat of Dobell in the 2022 federal election. indicates at what stage the winning candidate had over 50% of the votes and was declared the winner.

=== Elections in the 2010s ===
==== 2019 ====
2019 Australian federal election: Dobell
Party	Candidate	Votes	%	±%
Labor	Emma McBride	42,093	41.49	−1.39
Liberal	Jilly Pilon	41,326	40.73	+2.89
Greens	Scott Rickard	7,579	7.47	+1.67
United Australia	Aaron Harpley-Carr	5,411	5.33	+5.33
Independent	Gregory Stephenson	3,176	3.13	+1.91
Christian Democrats	Paula Grundy	1,868	1.84	−0.80
Total formal votes		101,453	94.03	−0.17
Informal votes		6,439	5.97	+0.17
Turnout		107,892	92.05	+0.11
Two-party-preferred result
Labor	Emma McBride	52,244	51.50	−3.31
Liberal	Jilly Pilon	49,209	48.50	+3.31
Labor hold		Swing	−3.31	

==== 2016 ====
2016 Australian federal election: Dobell
Party	Candidate	Votes	%	±%
Labor	Emma McBride	41,454	42.88	+6.48
Liberal	Karen McNamara	36,586	37.84	−2.97
One Nation	Carter Edwards	8,326	8.61	+8.61
Greens	Abigail Boyd	5,607	5.80	+0.91
Christian Democrats	Hadden Ervin	2,549	2.64	+1.21
Independent	Gregory Stephenson	1,176	1.22	+1.22
Independent	Paul Baker	976	1.01	+1.01
Total formal votes		96,674	94.20	+1.68
Informal votes		5,956	5.80	−1.68
Turnout		102,630	91.94	−1.09
Two-party-preferred result
Labor	Emma McBride	52,991	54.81	+4.63
Liberal	Karen McNamara	43,683	45.19	−4.63
Labor notional hold		Swing	+4.63	

==== 2013 ====
2013 Australian federal election: Dobell
Party	Candidate	Votes	%	±%
Liberal	Karen McNamara	35,617	41.35	+1.11
Labor	Emma McBride	30,248	35.11	−11.16
Independent	Nathan Bracken	7,090	8.23	+8.23
Greens	Sue Wynn	4,238	4.92	−3.69
Independent	Craig Thomson	3,444	4.00	+4.00
Palmer United	Kate McGill	2,920	3.39	+3.39
Christian Democrats	Hadden Ervin	1,250	1.45	−0.97
Citizens Electoral Council	Greg Owen	711	0.83	+0.83
Bullet Train	Christian Kunde	622	0.72	+0.72
Total formal votes		86,140	92.49	−1.45
Informal votes		6,994	7.51	+1.45
Turnout		93,134	93.82	−0.20
Two-party-preferred result
Liberal	Karen McNamara	43,653	50.68	+5.75
Labor	Emma McBride	42,487	49.32	−5.75
Liberal gain from Labor		Swing	+5.75	

==== 2010 ====
2010 Australian federal election: Dobell
Party	Candidate	Votes	%	±%
Labor	Craig Thomson	38,268	46.27	−0.08
Liberal	John McNamara	33,287	40.24	−2.05
Greens	Scott Rickard	7,121	8.61	+3.24
Family First	Gavin Brett	2,033	2.46	+0.75
Christian Democrats	Rhonda Avasalu	2,005	2.42	+0.54
Total formal votes		82,714	93.94	−1.74
Informal votes		5,333	6.06	+1.74
Turnout		88,047	94.01	−0.83
Two-party-preferred result
Labor	Craig Thomson	45,551	55.07	+1.14
Liberal	John McNamara	37,163	44.93	−1.14
Labor hold		Swing	+1.14	

=== Elections in the 2000s ===
==== 2007 ====
2007 Australian federal election: Dobell
Party	Candidate	Votes	%	±%
Labor	Craig Thomson	38,168	46.32	+8.85
Liberal	Ken Ticehurst	34,865	42.31	−6.32
Greens	Scott Rickard	4,429	5.38	+0.28
Independent	Doug Eaton	1,639	1.99	+1.99
Christian Democrats	Michael Darby	1,549	1.88	+1.88
Family First	Hadden Ervin	1,407	1.71	−0.49
Liberty & Democracy	Graeme Bird	182	0.22	+0.22
Citizens Electoral Council	Steve Hughes	157	0.19	+0.03
Total formal votes		82,396	95.68	+2.96
Informal votes		3,719	4.32	−2.97
Turnout		86,115	95.34	+0.42
Two-party-preferred result
Labor	Craig Thomson	44,413	53.90	+8.74
Liberal	Ken Ticehurst	37,983	46.10	−8.74
Labor gain from Liberal		Swing	+8.74	

==== 2004 ====
2004 Australian federal election: Dobell
Party	Candidate	Votes	%	±%
Liberal	Ken Ticehurst	37,347	49.53	+5.60
Labor	David Mehan	27,417	36.36	−6.32
Greens	Scott Rickard	3,782	5.02	+2.07
Family First	Naomi Paton	1,656	2.20	+2.20
Liberals for Forests	Frank Sanzari	1,487	1.97	+1.97
One Nation	Andrew Webber	1,163	1.54	−2.78
Democrats	Carolyn Hastie	647	0.86	−3.35
Independent	Paul Unger	475	0.63	+0.63
Outdoor Recreation	Siou Hong Chia	445	0.59	+0.59
Independent	Les Wallace	430	0.57	+0.57
Independent	James Laing-Peach	417	0.55	+0.55
Citizens Electoral Council	Steven Hughes	132	0.18	+0.18
Total formal votes		75,398	92.59	−3.15
Informal votes		6,037	7.41	+3.15
Turnout		81,435	95.07	+0.09
Two-party-preferred result
Liberal	Ken Ticehurst	42,151	55.90	+5.52
Labor	David Mehan	33,247	44.10	−5.52
Liberal hold		Swing	+5.52	

==== 2001 ====
2001 Australian federal election: Dobell
Party	Candidate	Votes	%	±%
Liberal	Ken Ticehurst	32,761	43.93	+5.51
Labor	Michael Lee	31,824	42.68	−1.94
One Nation	Ron Falconer	3,223	4.32	−5.05
Democrats	Carolyn Hastie	3,142	4.21	+0.79
Greens	Samantha Ker	2,200	2.95	+0.80
Christian Democrats	Luke Hennig	1,420	1.90	−0.12
Total formal votes		74,570	95.74	−1.22
Informal votes		3,318	4.26	+1.22
Turnout		77,888	95.61	
Two-party-preferred result
Liberal	Ken Ticehurst	37,565	50.38	+1.91
Labor	Michael Lee	37,005	49.62	−1.91
Liberal gain from Labor		Swing	+1.91	

=== Elections in the 1990s ===
==== 1998 ====
1998 Australian federal election: Dobell
Party	Candidate	Votes	%	±%
Labor	Michael Lee	34,770	45.26	+1.40
Liberal	David Parker	29,014	37.77	−5.54
One Nation	June Beckett	7,300	9.50	+9.50
Democrats	David Mott	2,546	3.31	−3.80
Greens	Philip Dwyer	1,626	2.12	+2.12
Christian Democrats	Karen Russell	1,564	2.04	+0.26
Total formal votes		76,820	96.89	−0.17
Informal votes		2,466	3.11	+0.17
Turnout		79,286	95.69	−1.05
Two-party-preferred result
Labor	Michael Lee	40,980	53.35	+3.27
Liberal	David Parker	35,840	46.65	−3.27
Labor hold		Swing	+3.27	

==== 1996 ====
1996 Australian federal election: Dobell
Party	Candidate	Votes	%	±%
Labor	Michael Lee	32,221	43.86	−9.55
Liberal	Doug Eaton	31,817	43.31	+3.17
Democrats	True Martin	5,223	7.11	+3.76
Against Further Immigration	Jeremy Pritchard	2,146	2.92	+2.92
Call to Australia	Graham Freemantle	1,304	1.78	+1.78
Independent	Aldo Katalinic	751	1.02	+1.02
Total formal votes		73,462	97.06	−0.87
Informal votes		2,224	2.94	+0.87
Turnout		75,686	96.74	−0.27
Two-party-preferred result
Labor	Michael Lee	36,675	50.08	−6.74
Liberal	Doug Eaton	36,558	49.92	+6.74
Labor hold		Swing	−6.74	

==== 1993 ====
1993 Australian federal election: Dobell
Party	Candidate	Votes	%	±%
Labor	Michael Lee	36,795	53.41	+6.54
Liberal	Bob Baldwin	27,654	40.14	+5.39
Democrats	Brian Day	2,311	3.35	−6.75
Independent	Bob Hudson	2,131	3.09	+3.09
Total formal votes		68,891	97.94	+0.32
Informal votes		1,452	2.06	−0.32
Turnout		70,343	97.01	
Two-party-preferred result
Labor	Michael Lee	39,140	56.82	−0.57
Liberal	Bob Baldwin	29,746	43.18	+0.57
Labor hold		Swing	−0.57	

==== 1990 ====
1990 Australian federal election: Dobell
Party	Candidate	Votes	%	±%
Labor	Michael Lee	37,063	51.1	−2.0
Liberal	Ian Crook	23,659	32.6	−5.4
Democrats	Rod Benninson	6,317	8.7	−0.2
Grey Power	Neville Malloy	1,948	2.7	+2.7
Independent	Gordon Craig	1,861	2.6	+2.6
Central Coast Greens	Karl Singman	1,657	2.3	+2.3
Total formal votes		72,505	97.6	
Informal votes		1,801	2.4	
Turnout		74,306	95.6	
Two-party-preferred result
Labor	Michael Lee	43,860	60.6	+3.7
Liberal	Ian Crook	28,505	39.4	−3.7
Labor hold		Swing	+3.7	

=== Elections in the 1980s ===
==== 1987 ====
1987 Australian federal election: Dobell
Party	Candidate	Votes	%	±%
Labor	Michael Lee	33,719	53.1	−3.1
Liberal	Les Nunn	24,168	38.0	+1.7
Democrats	Graeme Ward	5,657	8.9	+1.4
Total formal votes		63,544	96.1	
Informal votes		2,580	3.9	
Turnout		66,124	95.4	
Two-party-preferred result
Labor	Michael Lee	36,161	56.9	−3.0
Liberal	Les Nunn	27,383	43.1	+3.0
Labor hold		Swing	−3.0	

==== 1984 ====
1984 Australian federal election: Dobell
Party	Candidate	Votes	%	±%
Labor	Michael Lee	31,112	56.2	−6.6
Liberal	Isaac Shields	20,114	36.3	+2.7
Democrats	Lynn Sawyer	4,168	7.5	+5.6
Total formal votes		55,394	94.0	
Informal votes		3,522	6.0	
Turnout		58,916	94.2	
Two-party-preferred result
Labor	Michael Lee	33,159	59.9	−1.1
Liberal	Isaac Shields	22,235	40.1	+1.1
Labor notional hold		Swing	−1.1	
