= Electoral results for the district of Wyong =

Election results for Wyong, New South Wales, Australia

Wyong, an electoral district of the Legislative Assembly in the Australian state of New South Wales, has had two incarnations, the first from 1962 to 1973, the second from 1988 to the present.

== Members ==
First incarnation (1962–1973)
| Election | Member | Party |
|---|---|---|
| 1962 | Ray Maher | Labor |
| 1965 | Harry Jensen | Labor |
| 1968 | Harry Jensen | Labor |
| 1971 | Harry Jensen | Labor |
Second incarnation (1988–present)
| Election | Member | Party |
| 1988 | Harry Moore | Labor |
| 1991 | Paul Crittenden | Labor |
| 1995 | Paul Crittenden | Labor |
| 1999 | Paul Crittenden | Labor |
| 2003 | Paul Crittenden | Labor |
| 2007 | David Harris | Labor |
| 2011 | Darren Webber | Liberal |
| 2015 | David Harris | Labor |
| 2019 | David Harris | Labor |
| 2023 | David Harris | Labor |

== Election results ==
=== Elections in the 2020s ===
==== 2023 ====
2023 New South Wales state election: Wyong
| Party | Candidate | Votes | % | ±% |
|---|---|---|---|---|
| Labor | David Harris | 24,575 | 52.2 | −0.3 |
| Liberal | Matt Squires (disendorsed) | 9,929 | 21.1 | −10.4 |
| One Nation | Martin Stevenson | 6,850 | 14.6 | +14.6 |
| Greens | Doug Williamson | 3,795 | 8.1 | −1.3 |
| Sustainable Australia | Susan Newbury | 1,897 | 4.0 | +4.0 |
| Total formal votes | | 47,046 | 96.0 | +1.2 |
| Informal votes | | 1,968 | 4.0 | −1.2 |
| Turnout | | 49,014 | 86.3 | −0.9 |
Two-party-preferred result
| Labor | David Harris | 27,899 | 69.8 | +6.9 |
| Liberal | Matt Squires (disendorsed) | 12,048 | 30.2 | −6.9 |
| Labor hold | | Swing | +6.9 | |

=== Elections in the 2010s ===
==== 2019 ====
2019 New South Wales state election: Wyong
| Party | Candidate | Votes | % | ±% |
|---|---|---|---|---|
| Labor | David Harris | 25,077 | 52.11 | +0.96 |
| Liberal | Ying Shu Li-Cantwell | 15,338 | 31.87 | −4.89 |
| Greens | Sue Wynn | 4,553 | 9.46 | +2.75 |
| Conservatives | Martin Stevenson | 3,153 | 6.55 | +6.55 |
| Total formal votes | | 48,121 | 94.77 | −0.91 |
| Informal votes | | 2,655 | 5.23 | +0.91 |
| Turnout | | 50,776 | 88.34 | −2.40 |
Two-party-preferred result
| Labor | David Harris | 27,296 | 62.45 | +3.72 |
| Liberal | Ying Shu Li-Cantwell | 16,415 | 37.55 | −3.72 |
| Labor hold | | Swing | +3.72 | |

==== 2015 ====
2015 New South Wales state election: Wyong
| Party | Candidate | Votes | % | ±% |
|---|---|---|---|---|
| Labor | David Harris | 23,565 | 51.1 | +13.2 |
| Liberal | Sandra Kerr | 16,936 | 36.8 | −10.5 |
| Greens | Vicki Dimond | 3,091 | 6.7 | −3.6 |
| No Land Tax | Annie McGeechan | 929 | 2.0 | +2.0 |
| Christian Democrats | Stevan Dragojevic | 914 | 2.0 | −1.2 |
| Socialist Equality | Noel Holt | 384 | 0.8 | +0.8 |
| Australia First | Alex Norwick | 252 | 0.5 | +0.5 |
| Total formal votes | | 46,071 | 95.7 | +0.1 |
| Informal votes | | 2,082 | 4.3 | −0.1 |
| Turnout | | 48,153 | 90.7 | +3.5 |
Two-party-preferred result
| Labor | David Harris | 25,037 | 58.7 | +13.3 |
| Liberal | Sandra Kerr | 17,597 | 41.3 | −13.3 |
| Labor gain from Liberal | | Swing | +13.3 | |

==== 2011 ====
2011 New South Wales state election: Wyong
| Party | Candidate | Votes | % | ±% |
|---|---|---|---|---|
| Liberal | Darren Webber | 20,665 | 45.9 | +14.3 |
| Labor | David Harris | 18,038 | 40.1 | −2.5 |
| Greens | Sue Wynn | 4,894 | 10.9 | +5.8 |
| Christian Democrats | Roger Fernandez | 1,444 | 3.2 | +0.5 |
| Total formal votes | | 45,031 | 96.1 | −1.2 |
| Informal votes | | 1,851 | 3.9 | +1.2 |
| Turnout | | 46,882 | 93.1 | |
Two-party-preferred result
| Liberal | Darren Webber | 21,771 | 52.6 | +9.5 |
| Labor | David Harris | 19,619 | 47.4 | −9.5 |
| Liberal gain from Labor | | Swing | +9.5 | |

=== Elections in the 2000s ===
==== 2007 ====
2007 New South Wales state election: Wyong
| Party | Candidate | Votes | % | ±% |
|---|---|---|---|---|
| Labor | David Harris | 18,006 | 42.5 | −12.6 |
| Liberal | Ben Morton | 13,363 | 31.6 | −1.5 |
| Independent | Greg Best | 6,058 | 14.3 | +14.3 |
| Greens | Scott Rickard | 2,138 | 5.0 | +0.1 |
| AAFI | Richard Spark | 1,627 | 3.8 | +2.3 |
| Christian Democrats | Adrian Loel | 1,151 | 2.7 | +0.5 |
| Total formal votes | | 42,343 | 97.2 | −0.4 |
| Informal votes | | 1,204 | 2.8 | +0.4 |
| Turnout | | 43,547 | 93.5 | |
Two-party-preferred result
| Labor | David Harris | 20,217 | 56.9 | −5.4 |
| Liberal | Ben Morton | 15,342 | 43.1 | +5.4 |
| Labor hold | | Swing | –5.4 | |

==== 2003 ====
2003 New South Wales state election: Wyong
| Party | Candidate | Votes | % | ±% |
|---|---|---|---|---|
| Labor | Paul Crittenden | 24,644 | 53.8 | −0.3 |
| Liberal | Ben Morton | 15,610 | 34.1 | +7.2 |
| Greens | Scott Rickard | 2,229 | 4.9 | +4.9 |
| Christian Democrats | Gerda Hailes | 1,138 | 2.5 | −0.4 |
| One Nation | Joanne May | 688 | 1.5 | −8.1 |
| AAFI | Joyce Moylan | 650 | 1.4 | −0.3 |
| Independent | Dianne Smith-Di Francesco | 425 | 0.9 | +0.9 |
| Democrats | Christopher Stennett | 409 | 0.9 | −2.0 |
| Total formal votes | | 45,793 | 97.7 | +0.1 |
| Informal votes | | 1,091 | 2.3 | −0.1 |
| Turnout | | 46,884 | 93.2 | |
Two-party-preferred result
| Labor | Paul Crittenden | 25,810 | 61.1 | −4.4 |
| Liberal | Ben Morton | 16,443 | 38.9 | +4.4 |
| Labor hold | | Swing | −4.4 | |

=== Elections in the 1990s ===
==== 1999 ====
1999 New South Wales state election: Wyong
| Party | Candidate | Votes | % | ±% |
|---|---|---|---|---|
| Labor | Paul Crittenden | 22,606 | 54.1 | −5.2 |
| Liberal | Doug Lamb | 11,233 | 26.9 | −13.0 |
| One Nation | Ron Holten | 4,004 | 9.6 | +9.6 |
| Democrats | David Mott | 1,199 | 2.9 | +2.5 |
| Christian Democrats | Bev Hopkins | 1,191 | 2.9 | +2.9 |
| Earthsave | Carolyn Hastie | 810 | 1.9 | +1.9 |
| AAFI | Maud Nelson | 730 | 1.7 | +1.7 |
| Total formal votes | | 41,773 | 97.6 | +3.9 |
| Informal votes | | 1,038 | 2.4 | −3.9 |
| Turnout | | 42,811 | 94.3 | |
Two-party-preferred result
| Labor | Paul Crittenden | 24,398 | 65.5 | +5.8 |
| Liberal | Doug Lamb | 12,873 | 34.5 | −5.8 |
| Labor hold | | Swing | +5.8 | |

==== 1995 ====
1995 New South Wales state election: Wyong
| Party | Candidate | Votes | % | ±% |
|---|---|---|---|---|
| Labor | Paul Crittenden | 20,748 | 58.7 | +5.6 |
| Liberal | Peter Richardson | 14,584 | 41.3 | +4.0 |
| Total formal votes | | 35,332 | 93.6 | +1.2 |
| Informal votes | | 2,433 | 6.4 | −1.2 |
| Turnout | | 37,765 | 94.3 | |
| Labor hold | | Swing | −0.3 | |

==== 1991 ====
1991 New South Wales state election: Wyong
| Party | Candidate | Votes | % | ±% |
|---|---|---|---|---|
| Labor | Paul Crittenden | 16,392 | 53.1 | −0.2 |
| Liberal | Rick Walton | 11,527 | 37.3 | −9.4 |
| Democrats | Jan Watts | 1,283 | 4.2 | +4.2 |
| Independent | Phil Kenny | 1,094 | 3.5 | +3.5 |
| Independent | Gordon Craig | 586 | 1.9 | +1.9 |
| Total formal votes | | 30,882 | 92.3 | −4.2 |
| Informal votes | | 2,570 | 7.7 | +4.2 |
| Turnout | | 33,452 | 94.2 | |
Two-party-preferred result
| Labor | Paul Crittenden | 17,613 | 59.0 | +5.7 |
| Liberal | Rick Walton | 12,229 | 41.0 | −5.7 |
| Labor hold | | Swing | +5.7 | |

=== Elections in the 1980s ===
==== 1988 ====
1988 New South Wales state election: Wyong
| Party | Candidate | Votes | % | ±% |
|---|---|---|---|---|
| Labor | Harry Moore | 16,494 | 54.5 | −3.9 |
| Liberal | Ian Crook | 13,754 | 45.5 | +14.0 |
| Total formal votes | | 30,248 | 96.5 | −1.1 |
| Informal votes | | 1,107 | 3.5 | +1.1 |
| Turnout | | 31,355 | 94.2 | |
| Labor notional hold | | Swing | −8.9 | |

District re-created

==== 1973–1988 ====
District abolished District abolished

=== Elections in the 1970s ===
==== 1971 ====
1971 New South Wales state election: Wyong
| Party | Candidate | Votes | % | ±% |
|---|---|---|---|---|
| Labor | Harry Jensen | 18,084 | 62.5 | +6.9 |
| Liberal | Geoffrey Gilchrist | 9,574 | 33.1 | −8.4 |
| Democratic Labor | Estelle Drinkwater | 1,275 | 4.4 | +1.5 |
| Total formal votes | | 28,933 | 98.7 | |
| Informal votes | | 380 | 1.3 | |
| Turnout | | 29,313 | 94.3 | |
Two-party-preferred result
| Labor | Harry Jensen | 18,339 | 63.4 | +6.8 |
| Liberal | Geoffrey Gilchrist | 10,594 | 36.6 | −6.8 |
| Labor hold | | Swing | +6.8 | |

=== Elections in the 1960s ===
==== 1968 ====
1968 New South Wales state election: Wyong
| Party | Candidate | Votes | % | ±% |
|---|---|---|---|---|
| Labor | Harry Jensen | 11,115 | 52.6 | |
| Liberal | Frederick Vaughan | 9,417 | 44.5 | |
| Democratic Labor | Herbert Collins | 619 | 2.9 | |
| Total formal votes | | 21,151 | 98.4 | |
| Informal votes | | 349 | 1.6 | |
| Turnout | | 21,500 | 94.6 | |
Two-party-preferred result
| Labor | Harry Jensen | 11,239 | 53.1 | +3.0 |
| Liberal | Frederick Vaughan | 9,912 | 46.9 | −3.0 |
| Labor hold | | Swing | +3.0 | |

==== 1965 ====
1965 New South Wales state election: Wyong
| Party | Candidate | Votes | % | ±% |
|---|---|---|---|---|
| Labor | Harry Jensen | 12,273 | 55.6 | +2.3 |
| Liberal | Kenneth Charters | 8,928 | 40.4 | +0.6 |
| Democratic Labor | Hugh Ansell | 888 | 4.0 | +0.3 |
| Total formal votes | | 22,089 | 98.7 | +0.2 |
| Informal votes | | 298 | 1.3 | −0.2 |
| Turnout | | 22,387 | 94.9 | +0.4 |
Two-party-preferred result
| Labor | Harry Jensen | 12,451 | 56.4 | +0.8 |
| Liberal | Kenneth Charters | 9,638 | 43.6 | −0.8 |
| Labor hold | | Swing | +0.8 | |

==== 1962 ====
1962 New South Wales state election: Wyong
| Party | Candidate | Votes | % | ±% |
|---|---|---|---|---|
| Labor | Ray Maher | 10,431 | 53.3 | |
| Liberal | Kenneth Charters | 7,797 | 39.8 | |
| Democratic Labor | Hugh Ansell | 727 | 3.7 | |
| Independent | Harold Turnbull | 615 | 3.1 | |
| Total formal votes | | 19,570 | 98.5 | |
| Informal votes | | 293 | 1.5 | |
| Turnout | | 19,863 | 94.5 | |
Two-party-preferred result
| Labor | Ray Maher | 10,883 | 55.6 | |
| Liberal | Kenneth Charters | 8,687 | 44.4 | |
| Labor notional hold | | Swing | N/A | |

- Wyong was a new seat that was notionally a safe Labor seat.
