= Electoral results for the district of Tuggerah =

Election results for Tuggerah, New South Wales, Australia

Tuggerah, an electoral district of the Legislative Assembly in the Australian state of New South Wales, was created in 1981 and abolished in 1988.

Election	Member	Party
1981	Harry Moore	Labor
1984	Harry Moore	Labor

== Election results ==
=== Elections in the 1980s ===
==== 1984 ====
1984 New South Wales state election: Tuggerah
Party	Candidate	Votes	%	±%
Labor	Harry Moore	18,345	55.8	−3.3
Liberal	Leslie Nunn	10,416	31.7	+2.1
Independent	Clem Payne	2,664	8.1	+8.1
Democrats	Lynn Sawyer	1,438	4.4	−6.9
Total formal votes		32,863	97.7	+0.4
Informal votes		766	2.3	−0.4
Turnout		33,629	93.2	+2.2
Two-party-preferred result
Labor	Harry Moore		61.8	−5.0
Liberal	Leslie Nunn		38.2	+5.0
Labor hold		Swing	−5.0	

==== 1981 ====
1981 New South Wales state election: Tuggerah
Party	Candidate	Votes	%	±%
Labor	Harry Moore	17,724	59.1	
Liberal	Joan Skaife	8,883	29.6	
Democrats	Lynn Sawyer	3,382	11.3	
Total formal votes		29,989	97.3	
Informal votes		817	2.7	
Turnout		30,806	91.0	
Two-party-preferred result
Labor	Harry Moore	19,108	66.8	−3.2
Liberal	Joan Skaife	9,503	33.2	+3.2
Labor notional hold		Swing	−3.2	
