= Post-election pendulum for the 2013 Australian federal election =

The Coalition won the 2013 federal election with 90 of 150 lower house seats on a current 17-seat, 3.65-point two-party swing, defeating the 6-year Labor government. Labor holds 55 seats while crossbenchers hold the remaining five. The Division of Fairfax was the last seat to be declared.

Classification of seats as marginal, fairly safe or safe is applied by the independent Australian Electoral Commission using the following definition: "Where a winning party receives less than 56% of the vote, the seat is classified as 'marginal', 56–60% is classified as 'fairly safe' and more than 60% is considered 'safe'."

== Pendulum ==
The Mackerras pendulum was devised by the Australian psephologist Malcolm Mackerras as a way of predicting the outcome of an election contested between two major parties in a Westminster style lower house legislature such as the Australian House of Representatives, which is composed of single-member electorates and which uses a preferential voting system such as a Condorcet method or IRV.

The pendulum works by lining up all of the seats held in Parliament for the government, the opposition and the cross benches according to the percentage-point margin they are held by on a two party preferred basis. This is also known as the swing required for the seat to change hands. Given a uniform swing to the opposition or government parties, the number of seats that change hands can be predicted.

Government seats (90)
Marginal (28)
| Barton (NSW) | Nickolas Varvaris | LIB | 0.31 |
| Petrie (Qld) | Luke Howarth | LNP | 0.53 |
| Eden-Monaro (NSW) | Peter Hendy | LIB | 0.61 |
| Dobell (NSW) | Karen McNamara | LIB | 0.68 |
| Capricornia (Qld) | Michelle Landry | LNP | 0.77 |
| Reid (NSW) | Craig Laundy | LIB | 0.85 |
| O’Connor (WA) | Rick Wilson | LIB | 0.95 V NWA |
| Lyons (Tas) | Eric Hutchinson | LIB | 1.22 |
| Solomon (NT) | Natasha Griggs | CLP | 1.40 |
| Banks (NSW) | David Coleman | LIB | 1.83 |
| Hindmarsh (SA) | Matt Williams | LIB | 1.89 |
| Page (NSW) | Kevin Hogan | NAT | 2.52 |
| Braddon (Tas) | Brett Whiteley | LIB | 2.56 |
| Gilmore (NSW) | Ann Sudmalis | LIB | 2.65 |
| Lindsay (NSW) | Fiona Scott | LIB | 2.99 |
| Robertson (NSW) | Lucy Wicks | LIB | 3.00 |
| Deakin (Vic) | Michael Sukkar | LIB | 3.18 |
| Bonner (Qld) | Ross Vasta | LNP | 3.69 |
| Corangamite (Vic) | Sarah Henderson | LIB | 3.94 |
| Durack (WA) | Melissa Price | LIB | 3.98 V NWA |
| La Trobe (Vic) | Jason Wood | LIB | 4.01 |
| Bass (Tas) | Andrew Nikolic | LIB | 4.04 |
| Brisbane (Qld) | Teresa Gambaro | LNP | 4.28 |
| Forde (Qld) | Bert van Manen | LNP | 4.38 |
| Macquarie (NSW) | Louise Markus | LIB | 4.48 |
| Hasluck (WA) | Ken Wyatt | LIB | 4.87 |
| Dunkley (Vic) | Bruce Billson | LIB | 5.57 |
| Leichhardt (Qld) | Warren Entsch | LNP | 5.68 |
Fairly safe (19)
| Herbert (Qld) | Ewen Jones | LNP | 6.17 |
| Mallee (Vic) | Andrew Broad | NAT | 6.21 V LIB |
| Flynn (Qld) | Ken O'Dowd | LNP | 6.53 |
| Swan (WA) | Steve Irons | LIB | 6.53 |
| Dickson (Qld) | Peter Dutton | LNP | 6.72 |
| Longman (Qld) | Wyatt Roy | LNP | 6.92 |
| Boothby (SA) | Andrew Southcott | LIB | 7.12 |
| Casey (Vic) | Tony Smith | LIB | 7.17 |
| Cowan (WA) | Luke Simpkins | LIB | 7.46 |
| Dawson (Qld) | George Christensen | LNP | 7.58 |
| Bennelong (NSW) | John Alexander | LIB | 7.77 |
| Pearce (WA) | Christian Porter | LIB | 8.06 |
| Aston (Vic) | Alan Tudge | LIB | 8.20 |
| Ryan (Qld) | Jane Prentice | LNP | 8.54 |
| Bowman (Qld) | Andrew Laming | LNP | 8.86 |
| Hinkler (Qld) | Keith Pitt | LNP | 9.04 |
| Fisher (Qld) | Mal Brough | LNP | 9.75 |
| Paterson (NSW) | Bob Baldwin | LIB | 9.78 |
| Higgins (Vic) | Kelly O'Dwyer | LIB | 9.93 |
Safe (43)
| Wannon (Vic) | Dan Tehan | LIB | 10.07 |
| Sturt (SA) | Christopher Pyne | LIB | 10.08 |
| Stirling (WA) | Michael Keenan | LIB | 10.30 |
| Hughes (NSW) | Craig Kelly | LIB | 10.67 |
| Goldstein (Vic) | Andrew Robb | LIB | 11.03 |
| Kooyong (Vic) | Josh Frydenberg | LIB | 11.06 |
| Macarthur (NSW) | Russell Matheson | LIB | 11.36 |
| Hume (NSW) | Angus Taylor | LIB | 11.47 |
| Cowper (NSW) | Luke Hartsuyker | NAT | 11.71 |
| Canning (WA) | Don Randall | LIB | 11.81 |
| Flinders (Vic) | Greg Hunt | LIB | 11.81 |
| McMillan (Vic) | Russell Broadbent | LIB | 11.83 |
| Wright (Qld) | Scott Buchholz | LNP | 11.84 |
| Moore (WA) | Ian Goodenough | LIB | 11.86 |
| Forrest (WA) | Nola Marino | LIB | 12.28 |
| Mayo (SA) | Jamie Briggs | LIB | 12.51 |
| McPherson (Qld) | Karen Andrews | LNP | 13.00 |
| Wide Bay (Qld) | Warren Truss | LNP | 13.16 |
| Grey (SA) | Rowan Ramsey | LIB | 13.54 |
| Fadden (Qld) | Stuart Robert | LNP | 14.36 |
| Menzies (Vic) | Kevin Andrews | LIB | 14.45 |
| New England (NSW) | Barnaby Joyce | NAT | 14.46 V IND |
| Tangney (WA) | Dennis Jensen | LIB | 14.67 |
| Lyne (NSW) | David Gillespie | NAT | 14.77 |
| Warringah (NSW) | Tony Abbott | LIB | 15.35 |
| Gippsland (Vic) | Darren Chester | NAT | 15.84 |
| North Sydney (NSW) | Joe Hockey | LIB | 15.89 |
| Calare (NSW) | John Cobb | NAT | 15.97 |
| Cook (NSW) | Scott Morrison | LIB | 16.35 |
| Groom (Qld) | Ian Macfarlane | LNP | 16.47 |
| Barker (SA) | Tony Pasin | LIB | 16.55 |
| Curtin (WA) | Julie Bishop | LIB | 17.42 |
| Farrer (NSW) | Sussan Ley | LIB | 17.43 |
| Wentworth (NSW) | Malcolm Turnbull | LIB | 17.72 |
| Moncrieff (Qld) | Steven Ciobo | LNP | 17.95 |
| Mackellar (NSW) | Bronwyn Bishop | LIB | 18.84 |
| Berowra (NSW) | Philip Ruddock | LIB | 19.07 |
| Bradfield (NSW) | Paul Fletcher | LIB | 20.78 |
| Murray (Vic) | Sharman Stone | LIB | 20.87 |
| Riverina (NSW) | Michael McCormack | NAT | 21.17 |
| Mitchell (NSW) | Alex Hawke | LIB | 22.08 |
| Maranoa (Qld) | Bruce Scott | LNP | 22.28 |
| Parkes (NSW) | Mark Coulton | NAT | 22.35 |

Opposition seats (55)
Marginal (29)
| McEwen (Vic) | Rob Mitchell | ALP | 0.15 |
| Parramatta (NSW) | Julie Owens | ALP | 0.57 |
| Lingiari (NT) | Warren Snowdon | ALP | 0.88 |
| Bendigo (Vic) | Lisa Chesters | ALP | 1.26 |
| Lilley (Qld) | Wayne Swan | ALP | 1.32 |
| Moreton (Qld) | Graham Perrett | ALP | 1.55 |
| Chisholm (Vic) | Anna Burke | ALP | 1.60 |
| Bruce (Vic) | Alan Griffin | ALP | 1.80 |
| Werriwa (NSW) | Laurie Ferguson | ALP | 2.24 |
| Kingsford Smith (NSW) | Matt Thistlethwaite | ALP | 2.74 |
| Brand (WA) | Gary Gray | ALP | 2.88 |
| Greenway (NSW) | Michelle Rowland | ALP | 2.98 |
| Richmond (NSW) | Justine Elliot | ALP | 2.98 |
| Griffith (Qld) | Kevin Rudd | ALP | 3.01 |
| Jagajaga (Vic) | Jenny Macklin | ALP | 3.13 |
| Wakefield (SA) | Nick Champion | ALP | 3.40 |
| Melbourne Ports (Vic) | Michael Danby | ALP | 3.56 |
| Hunter (NSW) | Joel Fitzgibbon | ALP | 3.67 |
| Oxley (Qld) | Bernie Ripoll | ALP | 3.77 |
| Isaacs (Vic) | Mark Dreyfus | ALP | 3.86 |
| Adelaide (SA) | Kate Ellis | ALP | 3.95 |
| Perth (WA) | Alannah MacTiernan | ALP | 4.35 |
| Fremantle (WA) | Melissa Parke | ALP | 4.77 |
| Rankin (Qld) | Jim Chalmers | ALP | 4.78 |
| Ballarat (Vic) | Catherine King | ALP | 4.89 |
| Makin (SA) | Tony Zappia | ALP | 5.06 |
| Franklin (Tas) | Julie Collins | ALP | 5.09 |
| Blair (Qld) | Shayne Neumann | ALP | 5.26 |
| McMahon (NSW) | Chris Bowen | ALP | 5.32 |
Fairly safe (11)
| Watson (NSW) | Tony Burke | ALP | 6.81 |
| Canberra (ACT) | Gai Brodtmann | ALP | 6.98 |
| Shortland (NSW) | Jill Hall | ALP | 7.21 |
| Hotham (Vic) | Clare O'Neil | ALP | 7.27 |
| Corio (Vic) | Richard Marles | ALP | 7.75 |
| Throsby (NSW) | Stephen Jones | ALP | 7.77 |
| Newcastle (NSW) | Sharon Claydon | ALP | 8.83 |
| Holt (Vic) | Anthony Byrne | ALP | 9.09 |
| Charlton (NSW) | Pat Conroy | ALP | 9.23 |
| Kingston (SA) | Amanda Rishworth | ALP | 9.70 |
| Cunningham (NSW) | Sharon Bird | ALP | 9.88 |
Safe (15)
| Chifley (NSW) | Ed Husic | ALP | 10.55 |
| Batman (Vic) | David Feeney | ALP | 10.61 V GRN |
| Maribyrnong (Vic) | Bill Shorten | ALP | 11.39 |
| Blaxland (NSW) | Jason Clare | ALP | 11.43 |
| Lalor (Vic) | Joanne Ryan | ALP | 12.16 |
| Fraser (ACT) | Andrew Leigh | ALP | 12.62 |
| Calwell (Vic) | Maria Vamvakinou | ALP | 13.86 |
| Port Adelaide (SA) | Mark Butler | ALP | 14.02 |
| Scullin (Vic) | Andrew Giles | ALP | 14.35 |
| Sydney (NSW) | Tanya Plibersek | ALP | 14.65 |
| Wills (Vic) | Kelvin Thomson | ALP | 15.20 V GRN |
| Gorton (Vic) | Brendan O’Connor | ALP | 16.12 |
| Gellibrand (Vic) | Tim Watts | ALP | 16.53 |
| Fowler (NSW) | Chris Hayes | ALP | 16.80 |
| Grayndler (NSW) | Anthony Albanese | ALP | 20.34 |
Crossbench seats (5)
| Fairfax (Qld) | Clive Palmer | PUP | 0.03 v LNP |
| Indi (Vic) | Cathy McGowan | IND | 0.25 v LIB |
| Kennedy (Qld) | Bob Katter | KAP | 2.19 v LNP |
| Melbourne (Vic) | Adam Bandt | GRN | 5.91 v ALP |
| Denison (Tas) | Andrew Wilkie | IND | 15.51 v ALP |
