= 2016 Australian federal election =

Election for the 45th Parliament of Australia

- 2 July 2016

All 150 seats in the House of Representatives 76 seats were needed for a majority All 76 seats in the Senate
- Opinion polls
- Registered: 15,671,551 ▲6.44%
- Turnout: 14,262,016 (91.01%) (▼2.22 pp)
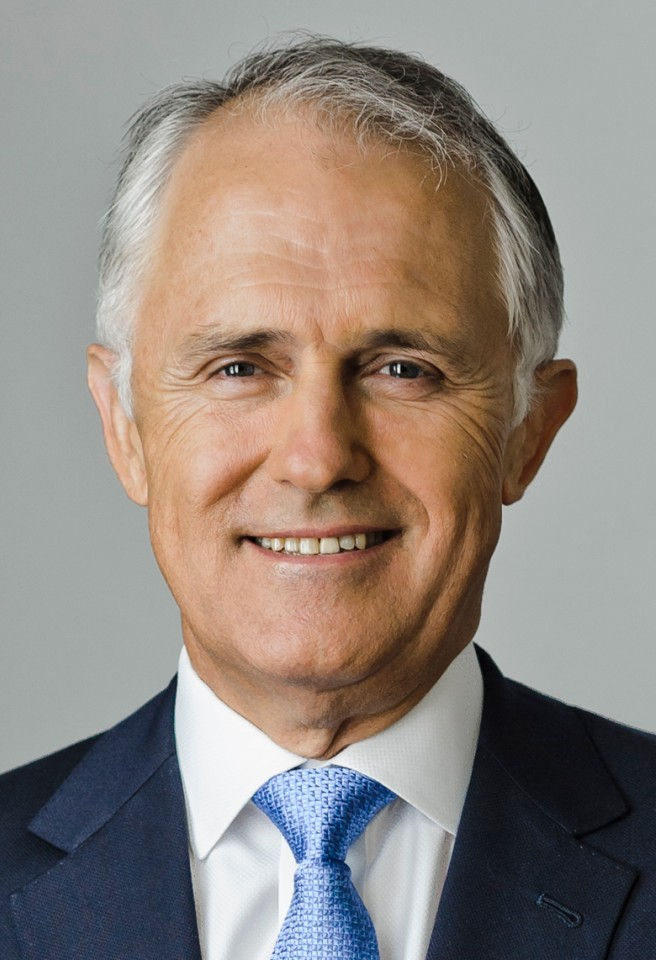

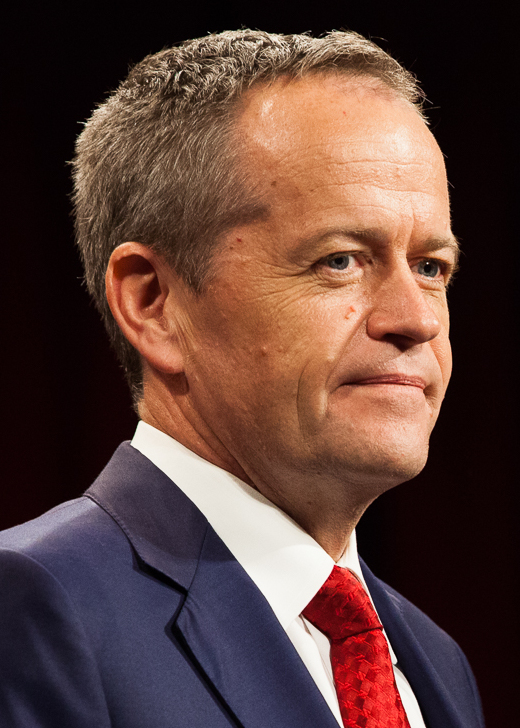

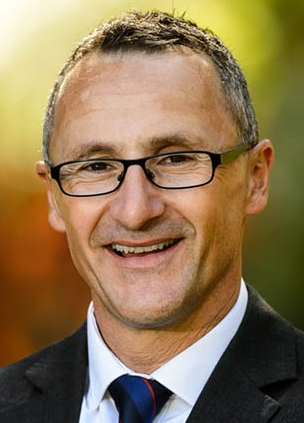

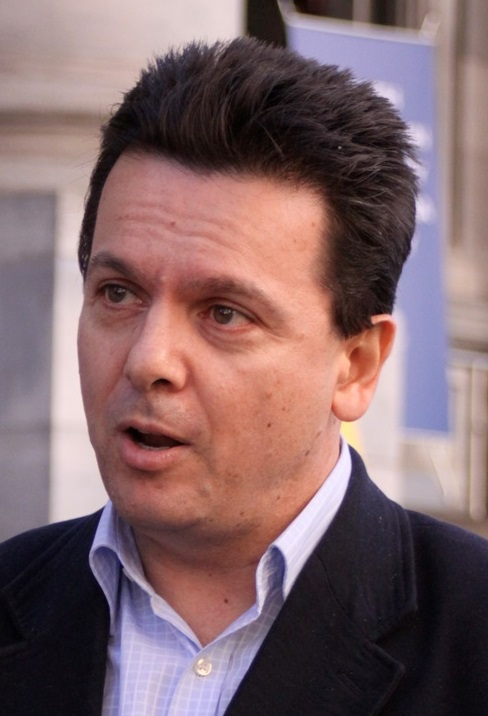

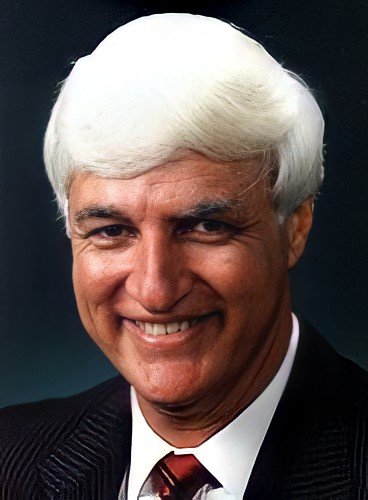
	First party	Second party	Third party
Leader	Malcolm Turnbull	Bill Shorten	Richard Di Natale
Party	Coalition	Labor	Greens
Leader since	14 September 2015	13 October 2013	6 May 2015
Leader's seat	Wentworth (NSW)	Maribyrnong (Vic.)	Victoria (Senate)
Last election	90 seats, 45.55%	55 seats, 33.38%	1 seat, 8.65%
Seats won	76	69	1
Seat change	▼14	▲14	Steady
Primary vote	5,693,605	4,702,296	1,385,651
Percentage	42.04%	34.73%	10.23%
Swing	▼3.51	▲1.35	▲1.58
TPP	50.36%	49.64%
TPP swing	▼3.13	▲3.13
	Fourth party	Fifth party	Sixth party
			IND
Leader	Nick Xenophon	Bob Katter	N/A
Party	Xenophon Team	Katter's Australian	Independents
Leader since	1 June 2013	3 June 2011	N/A
Leader's seat	South Australia (Senate)	Kennedy (Qld.)	N/A
Last election	New party	1 seat, 1.04%	2 seats, 1.37%
Seats won	1	1	2
Seat change	▲1	Steady	Steady
Primary vote	250,333	72,879	380,712
Percentage	1.85%	0.54%	2.81%
Swing	▲1.85	▼0.50	▲1.44
Prime Minister before election
Malcolm Turnbull
Liberal/National coalition
Subsequent Prime Minister
Malcolm Turnbull
Liberal/National coalition

A double dissolution election was held on 2 July 2016 to elect all 226 members of the 45th Parliament of Australia, after an extended eight-week official campaign period. It was the first double dissolution election since the 1987 election and the first under a new voting system for the Senate that replaced group voting tickets with optional preferential voting.

In the 150-seat House of Representatives, the one-term incumbent Coalition government was reelected with a reduced 76 seats, marking the first time since 2004 that a government had been reelected with an absolute majority. Labor picked up a significant number of previously government-held seats for a total of 69 seats, recovering much of what it had lost in its severe defeat of 2013. On the crossbench, the Greens, the Nick Xenophon Team, Katter's Australian Party, and independents Wilkie and McGowan won a seat each. For the first time since federation, a party managed to form government without winning a plurality of seats in the two most populous states, New South Wales and Victoria. One re-count was held by the Australian Electoral Commission (AEC) for the Division of Herbert, confirming that Labor won the seat by 37 votes.

The outcome in the 76-seat Senate took over four weeks to complete. Announced on 4 August, the results revealed a reduced plurality of 30 seats for the Coalition, 26 for Labor, and a record 20 for crossbenchers including 9 Greens, 4 from One Nation and 3 from the Xenophon Team. Former broadcaster and Justice Party founder Derryn Hinch won a seat, while Jacqui Lambie, Liberal Democrat David Leyonhjelm and Family First's Bob Day retained theirs. The Coalition will require nine additional votes for a Senate majority, an increase of three. Both major parties agreed to allocate six-year terms to the first six senators elected in each state, while the last six would serve three-year terms. Labor and the Coalition each gained a six-year Senator at the expense of Hinch and the Greens, who criticised the major parties for rejecting the "recount" method despite supporting it in two bipartisan senate resolutions in 1998 and 2010.

A number of initially elected senators were declared ineligible a result of the 2017–18 Australian parliamentary eligibility crisis, and replaced after recounts.

As of 2025 this is the most recent federal election for both of the major parties to have new leaders when Shorten replaced Kevin Rudd after the 2013 Australian federal election, loss for the latter, as Labor leader after beating Anthony Albanese in the October 2013 Australian Labor Party leadership election a month later, and Turnbull replaced Tony Abbott as Liberal leader and prime minister on 14 September 2015 after a leadership challenge win in the September 2015 Liberal Party of Australia leadership spill ten months prior.

== Electoral system ==
Elections in Australia use a full-preferential system in one vote, one value single-member seats for the 150-member House of Representatives (lower house) and in time for this election changed from full-preferential group voting tickets to an optional-preferential single transferable vote system of proportional representation in the 76-member Senate (upper house). Voting is compulsory but subject to constitutional constraints. The decision as to the type of election and its date is for the Prime Minister, who advises the Governor-General to set the process in motion by dissolving the lower or both houses and issuing writs for election.

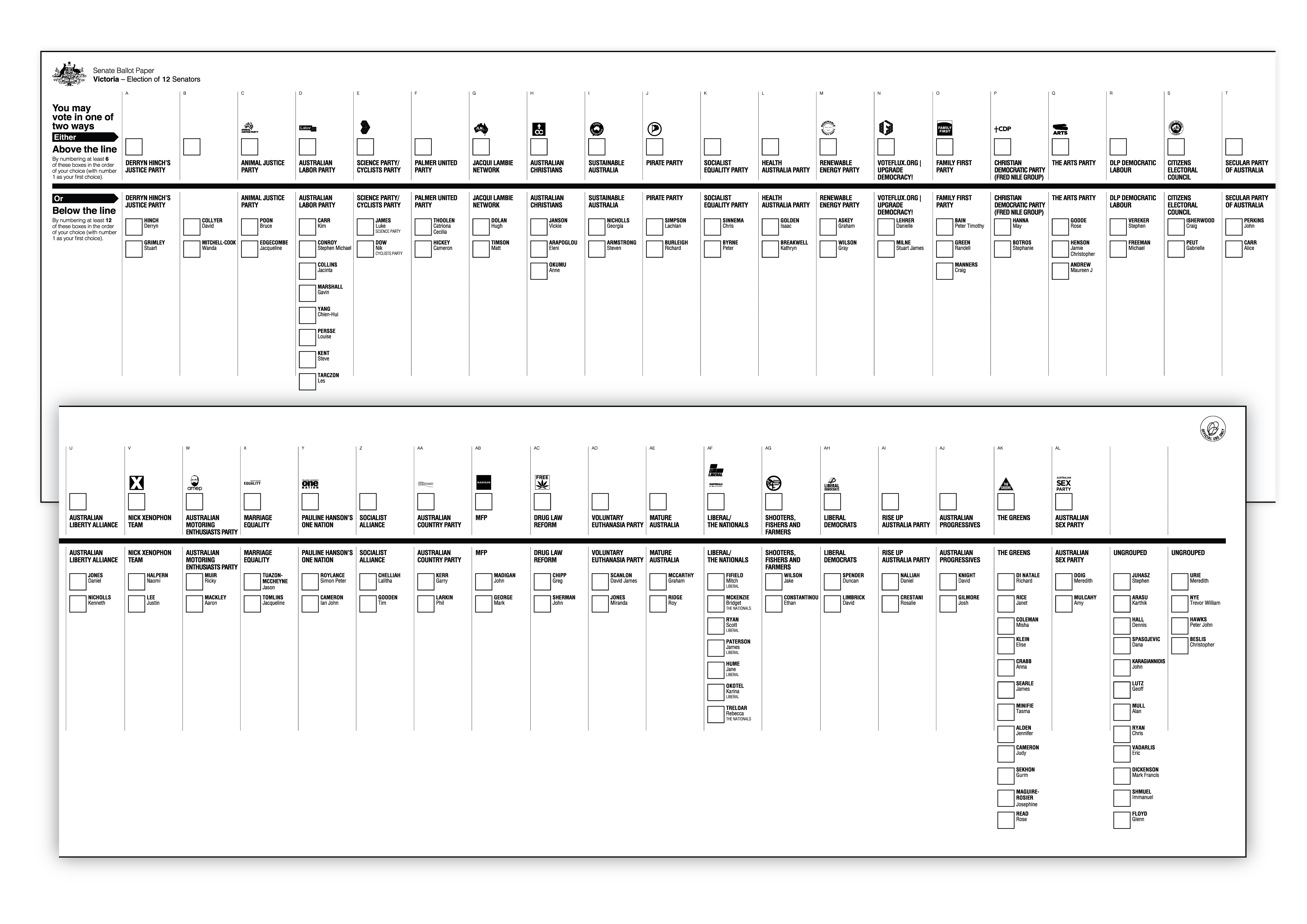
Senate ballot paper used in Victoria.

== Election date ==
Section 13 of the constitution requires that in half-Senate elections the election of state senators must take place within one year before the places become vacant. Since the normal terms of half the senators would have ended on 30 June 2017, the writs for a half-Senate election could not be issued earlier than 1 July 2016, and the earliest possible date for a simultaneous House/half-Senate election would have been 6 August 2016. There is no constitutional requirement for simultaneous elections for the Senate and the House of Representatives, and there are precedents for separate elections; however, governments and the electorate have long preferred that elections for the two Houses take place simultaneously.

A House-only election can be called at any time during a parliamentary term. Whether held simultaneously with a Senate election or separately, an election for the House of Representatives was required to have been held on or before 14 January 2017, which is calculated under provisions of the constitution and the Commonwealth Electoral Act 1918 (CEA). Section 28 of the Constitution of Australia provides that the term of a House expires three years from the first sitting of the House, unless it is dissolved earlier. The previous federal election was held on 7 September 2013. The 44th Parliament of Australia opened on 12 November 2013 and its term would have expired on 11 November 2016. Writs for an election can be issued up to ten days after a dissolution or expiry of the House. Up to 27 days can be allowed for nominations, and the actual election can be set for a maximum of 31 days after close of nominations, resulting in the latest possible House of Representatives election date of Saturday, 14 January 2017.

A double dissolution cannot take place within six months before the date of the expiry of the House of Representatives. (Note: Section 57 of the Constitution) That meant that a double dissolution could not be granted after 11 May 2016. Allowing for the same stages indicated above, the last possible date for a double dissolution election was 16 July 2016.

On 2 November 2015, Prime Minister Turnbull stated: "I would say around September–October [2016] is when you should expect the next election to be." However, in December 2015, ABC News reported that some "senior Liberal MPs" had been seeking an election as early as March 2016. An election held at this time would have required a separate half-Senate election to be held in late 2016 or early 2017.

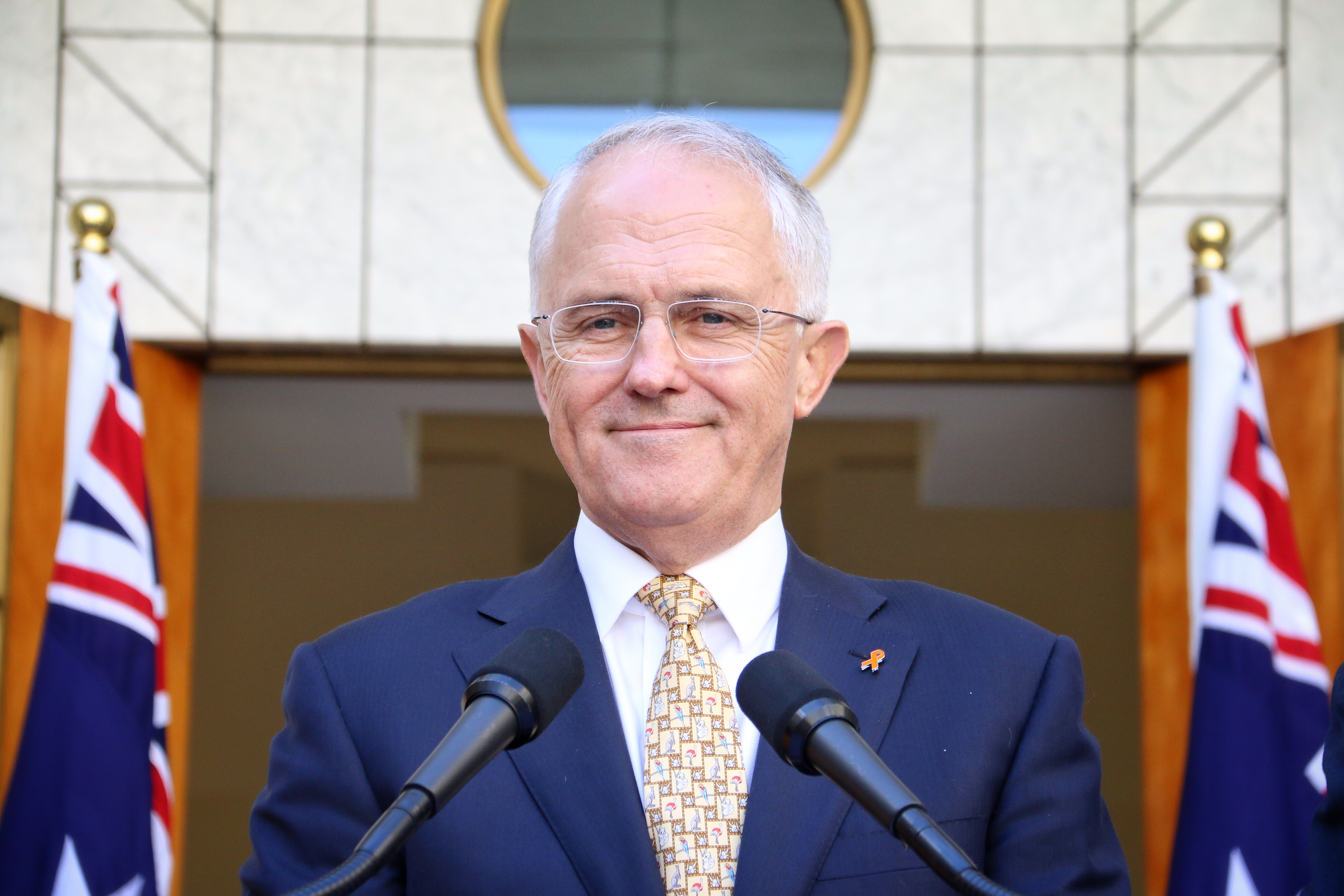
Prime Minister Malcolm Turnbull in March 2016

On 21 March 2016, Turnbull announced that the parliament would be recalled for both houses to sit on 18 April to consider for a third time the bills to reinstate the Australian Building and Construction Commission (ABCC). Turnbull also said that if the Senate failed to pass the bill, then there would be a double dissolution of parliament and an election would be held on 2 July. The delivery of the federal budget was also brought forward from 10 May to 3 May. On 18 April, the Senate once again rejected the bills to reinstate the ABCC. On 8 May Malcolm Turnbull attended Government House to advise the Governor-General to issue the writs for a double dissolution on 9 May. This confirmed the date of the election; 2 July 2016. In the weeks after 8 May, there were 132,000 additions to the electoral roll, and a total of 687,000 enrolment transactions, and it was estimated that 95% of eligible Australians were enrolled for the election, with a participation rate of those under 24 of 86.7%.

=== Double dissolution triggers ===
By 18 April 2016 there were four bills that met the requirements of Section 57 of the constitution for a double dissolution.

Second rejection by the Senate	Bill
18 June 2014	Clean Energy Finance Corporation (Abolition) Bill 2013 [No. 2]
17 August 2015	Fair Work (Registered Organisations) Amendment Bill 2014 [No. 2]
18 April 2016	Building and Construction Industry (Consequential and Transitional Provisions) Bill 2013 [No. 2]
18 April 2016	Building and Construction Industry (Improving Productivity) Bill 2013 [No. 2]

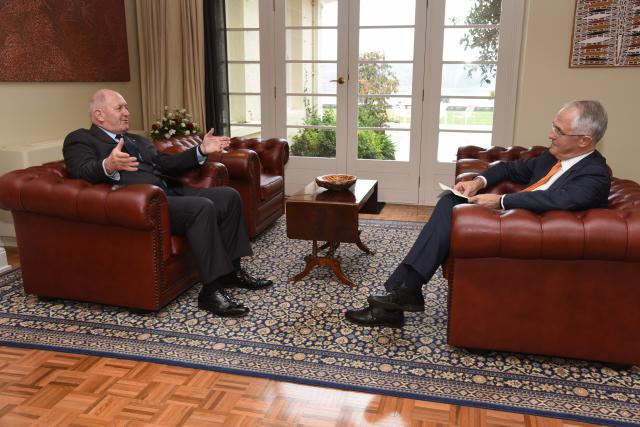
Malcolm Turnbull visits Sir Peter Cosgrove on 8 May 2016 to request a double dissolution

On 19 April the Prime Minister confirmed that, following the 2016 federal budget set for 3 May, he would advise the Governor-General to call a double dissolution election on Saturday 2 July. Any or all of these four bills could have been cited in his advice. On Sunday 8 May 2016, Turnbull visited Government House and formally advised Governor-General Sir Peter Cosgrove to dissolve both Houses of Parliament and issue the writs for a double dissolution election to be held on 2 July 2016. The advice was based on Parliament's inability to pass the following three bills:

- Building and Construction Industry (Consequential and Transitional Provisions) Bill 2013
- Building and Construction Industry (Improving Productivity) Bill 2013
- Fair Work (Registered Organisations) Amendment Bill 2014.

The Governor-General accepted the advice and dissolved both houses of the Parliament the following day, 9 May 2016.

=== Constitutional and legal provisions ===
The constitutional and legal provisions which impacted on the choice of election dates include:

- Section 12 of the Constitution provides that: "The Governor of any State may cause writs to be issued for the election of Senators for the State".
- Section 13 of the Constitution provides that the election of Senators shall be held in the period of twelve months before the places become vacant.
- Section 28 of the Constitution provides that: "Every House of Representatives shall continue for three years from the first sitting of the House, and no longer, but may be sooner dissolved by the Governor-General." Since the 44th Parliament opened on 12 November 2013, it would have expired on 11 November 2016. (Note: The reason it does not expire on 12 November 2016 is because 12 November 2013 was "Day 1" of the current House, not "Day 0". Therefore 12 November 2016 would be "Year 3, Day 1"; if the House sat on this day, it would be serving for longer than its 3-year mandate. Therefore its term would expire on the previous day. See Antony Green's Election Blog)
- Section 32 of the Constitution provides that: "The writs shall be issued within ten days from the expiry of a House of Representatives or from the proclamation of a dissolution thereof." Ten days after 11 November 2016 is 21 November 2016.
- Section 156 (1) of the Commonwealth Electoral Act 1918 (CEA) provides that: "The date fixed for the nomination of the candidates shall not be less than 10 days nor more than 27 days after the date of the writ". Twenty-seven days after 21 November 2016 is 18 December 2016.
- Section 157 of the CEA provides that: "The date fixed for the polling shall not be less than 23 days nor more than 31 days after the date of nomination". Thirty-one days after 18 December 2016 is 18 January 2017, a Wednesday.
- Section 158 of the CEA provides that: "The day fixed for the polling shall be a Saturday". The Saturday before 18 January 2017 is 14 January 2017. This was therefore the latest possible date for the election. However, it was unlikely that an election would have been called for this date, as schools would be closed for summer holidays at this time. Governments tend to avoid holding elections during school holidays, since schools are often used as polling places.

== Election timeline ==
On 8 May 2016, the office of the Governor-General released documents relating to the calling of the election. The documents set out a timeline of key dates for the election.

- 9 May – Dissolution of both houses of the Parliament of Australia
- 16 May – Issue of writs
- 23 May – Close of electoral rolls
- 9 June – Close of candidate nominations
- 2 July – Polling day
- 8 August – Return of writs (last day)

== Background ==
The Coalition won the 2013 federal election with 90 of the 150 seats in the House of Representatives, on a swing of 17 seats or 3.6 points on a two-party basis, defeating the six-year Labor government. Labor held 55 seats, and crossbenchers held the remaining five. The Abbott government was sworn into office on 18 September 2013.

Kevin Rudd resigned as Labor's leader following the defeat of the party. Chris Bowen became the interim leader in the approach to a leadership election. Two candidates, Anthony Albanese and Bill Shorten, declared their candidacy; Shorten was declared the winner on 13 October 2013.

As a result of lost ballot papers, on 18 February 2014 the High Court of Australia, sitting as the Court of Disputed Returns, ordered a new half-Senate election for Western Australia, which was held on 5 April 2014.

Senator John Madigan resigned from the Democratic Labour Party and became an independent Senator in September 2014, citing long-term internal party tensions.

On 24 November 2014, Tasmanian Senator Jacqui Lambie resigned from the Palmer United Party and on 13 March 2015, Queensland Senator Glenn Lazarus also announced his resignation from the Palmer United Party; both then sat as independents.

On 14 September 2015, the incumbent Prime Minister, Tony Abbott, was challenged for the leadership of the Liberal Party and thus the prime ministership by Malcolm Turnbull, the Minister for Communications. Turnbull won the vote 54–44 and on 15 September was sworn in as prime minister, starting the Turnbull government. On 11 February 2016 Warren Truss, the Deputy Prime Minister, announced his decision to retire from politics at the 2016 federal election and immediately stood aside as Leader of the Nationals. Barnaby Joyce was elected as Leader and was sworn as the Deputy Prime Minister, and Fiona Nash was elected as Deputy Leader of the Nationals. Truss also resigned from the Turnbull Ministry.

Ian Macfarlane attempted to defect from the Liberal to the National party room with accompanying demands for additional Nationals cabinet representation, and the Mal Brough–James Ashby diary controversy deepened in the last week of the campaign. Along with the unexpected by-election swing and Turnbull's significantly lessened personal ratings in the concurrent December Newspoll, some News Corp Australia journalists claimed that Turnbull's honeymoon was over.

The Nick Xenophon Team (NXT) listed many candidates throughout Australia, with ABC psephologist Antony Green indicating NXT had a "strong chance of winning lower house seats and three or four Senate seats".

Liberal Senator Michael Ronaldson announced on 18 December 2015 that he would leave parliament before the next election, after moving from the outer ministry in the Abbott government to the backbench in the Turnbull government. He resigned on 28 February 2016, and the casual vacancy was filled by James Paterson on 9 March 2016.

Labor Senator Joe Bullock announced on 1 March 2016 that he would be resigning from the Senate after the autumn sittings of parliament, citing—among other reasons—his opposition to same-sex marriage being at odds with the Labor Party's platform to bind its members in a supporting vote after 2019. Bullock tendered his resignation to Senate President Stephen Parry on 13 April 2016. The casual vacancy was filled by Pat Dodson on 28 April 2016.

Palmer United Party leader Clive Palmer announced on 4 May 2016 that he would not recontest his seat of Fairfax at the election. On 23 May he also ruled out running for a Senate seat.

In the lower house seat of Brisbane, both the Liberal-National and Labor candidates were openly gay; a first in Australian federal political history.

== By-elections ==
In the 44th Parliament, there were three by-elections. Rudd resigned from Parliament on 22 November 2013, triggering the 2014 Griffith by-election, which was held on 8 February, with Terri Butler retaining the seat for Labor.

On 21 July 2015, Liberal Don Randall died, triggering the 2015 Canning by-election, which was held on 19 September. Andrew Hastie retained the seat for the Liberal Party, having to rely on preferences after suffering a substantial swing to the Labor candidate.

Joe Hockey was not retained as Treasurer in the Turnbull Ministry, and announced his resignation from Parliament shortly afterwards, triggering the 2015 North Sydney by-election which was held on 5 December. The seat was retained for the Liberal Party by Trent Zimmerman. Zimmerman won with 48.2% of the primary vote after a larger-than-predicted 12.8-point swing against the Turnbull Coalition government. This was only the second time in North Sydney since federation that the successful Liberal candidate failed to obtain a majority of the primary vote and had to rely on preferences. Zimmerman faced a double-digit primary vote swing—more than triple that of the 2015 Canning by-election—despite the absence of a Labor candidate. Labor has never been successful in the safe Liberal seat. The Liberal two-candidate vote of 60.2% against independent Stephen Ruff compares with the previous election vote of 65.9% against Labor. The reduction of 5.7 points cannot be considered a "two-party/candidate preferred swing"—when a major party is absent, preference flows to both major parties do not take place, resulting in asymmetric preference flows.

== Redistributions and name changes ==
In November 2014 the Australian Electoral Commission announced that a redistribution of electoral boundaries in New South Wales and Western Australia would be undertaken before the next election. A determination of the states' membership entitlements under the Commonwealth Electoral Act 1918 meant that Western Australia's entitlement increased from 15 to 16 seats, and New South Wales' decreased from 48 to 47 seats. A redistribution also occurred in the Australian Capital Territory, as seven years had elapsed since the last time the ACT's boundaries were reviewed. On 16 November 2015, the AEC announced that a redistribution of electoral boundaries in Tasmania would be deferred until after the election, as the Electoral Act provides that a redistribution shall not commence where there is less than a year until the expiry of the House of Representatives (i.e., 11 November 2016).

The new seat created in Western Australia was the Division of Burt, named after the Burt family, specifically Sir Archibald Burt, Septimus Burt and Sir Francis Burt and centred on the south-east areas of metropolitan Perth. The Division of Throsby was renamed to Whitlam

In October 2015, the AEC also announced plans to abolish the seat of Hunter. Electors in the north of Hunter would have joined New England, while the roughly 40% remainder would have become part of Paterson, where the Liberal margin would have been reduced from a fairly safe 9.8 points to an extremely marginal 0.5 point as a result. Hunter was first contested at the inaugural 1901 federal election; the AEC's naming guidelines require it to make "every effort" to preserve the names of the original federal divisions. The Commission proposed renaming Charlton to Hunter, and in honour of deceased Prime Minister Gough Whitlam.

The final proposal, however, saw Charlton abolished, with Hunter moving slightly eastward to take in much of Charlton's territory. Additionally, Paterson was made more compact and pushed well to the south, taking in some heavily Labor territory that had previously been in Hunter and Newcastle. This had the effect of erasing the Liberals' majority in Paterson; Labor now had a notional majority of 0.5 per cent.

The Division of Fraser in the ACT was renamed Division of Fenner, to honour the late scientist Frank Fenner. The AEC announced that the name Fraser would be used for a future division in Victoria, named in honour of Malcolm Fraser, a former Prime Minister.

== Senate voting changes ==
Following the previous election, the Abbott government announced it would investigate changing the electoral system for the Senate. On 22 February 2016, the Turnbull government announced several proposed changes. In the Senate, the changes had the support of the Liberal/National Coalition, the Australian Greens, and Nick Xenophon. The legislation passed both houses of the Parliament of Australia on 18 March 2016 after the Senate sat all night debating the bill.

The changes abolished group voting tickets (GVTs) and introduced optional preferential voting, along with party logos on the ballot paper. The ballot paper continues to have a box for each party above a heavy line, with each party's candidates in a column below that party's box below the solid line. Previously, a voter could either mark a single box above the line, which triggered the party's group voting ticket (a pre-assigned sequence of preferences), or place a number in every box below the line to assign their own preferences. As a result of the changes, voters may assign their preferences for parties above the line (numbering as many boxes as they wish), or individual candidates below the line, and are not required to fill all of the boxes. Both above and below the line voting are now optional preferential voting. For above the line, voters will be instructed to write at least their first six preferences; however, a "savings provision" will still count the ballot if less than six were given. As a result, fewer votes are expected to be classed as informal; however, more ballots will "exhaust" as a result (i.e. some votes are not counted towards electing any candidate). For below the line, voters will be required to number at least their first 12 preferences. Voters will be free to continue numbering as many preferences as they like beyond the minimum number specified. Another savings provision will allow ballot papers with at least 6 below the line preferences to be formal, catering for people who confuse the above and below the line instructions.

Antony Green, a psephologist for the Australian Broadcasting Corporation, wrote several publications on various aspects of the proposed Senate changes. As with every double dissolution election the entire Senate is re-elected (12 seats per state rather than the usual half Senate election of six seats per state). Consequently, the number of votes required to earn a seat (the "quota") is halved. Due to the abolition of GVTs, it is no longer possible to create "calculators" that assess, with reasonable accuracy, the eventual senate election outcome. Therefore, according to Antony Green, "my working guide is that if a party has more than 0.5 of a quota, it will be in the race for one of the final seats." His calculation of the percentage of primary-vote required for the first six full- and half-quotas at this election is as follows:

Quotas	% vote	Quotas	% vote
0.5	3.8	1	7.7
1.5	11.5	2	15.4
2.5	19.2	3	23.1
3.5	26.9	4	30.8
4.5	34.6	5	38.5
5.5	42.3	6	46.2

== Campaign events ==
- 9 May – The House of Representatives and Senate are dissolved and the government enters caretaker mode.
- 11 May – The Labor Party announces it will disendorse its candidate for Fremantle, Chris Brown, after it is revealed that he did not disclose two convictions dating back to the 1980s.
- 13 May – The first televised people's forum involving Turnbull and Shorten is held in the Sydney suburb of South Windsor.

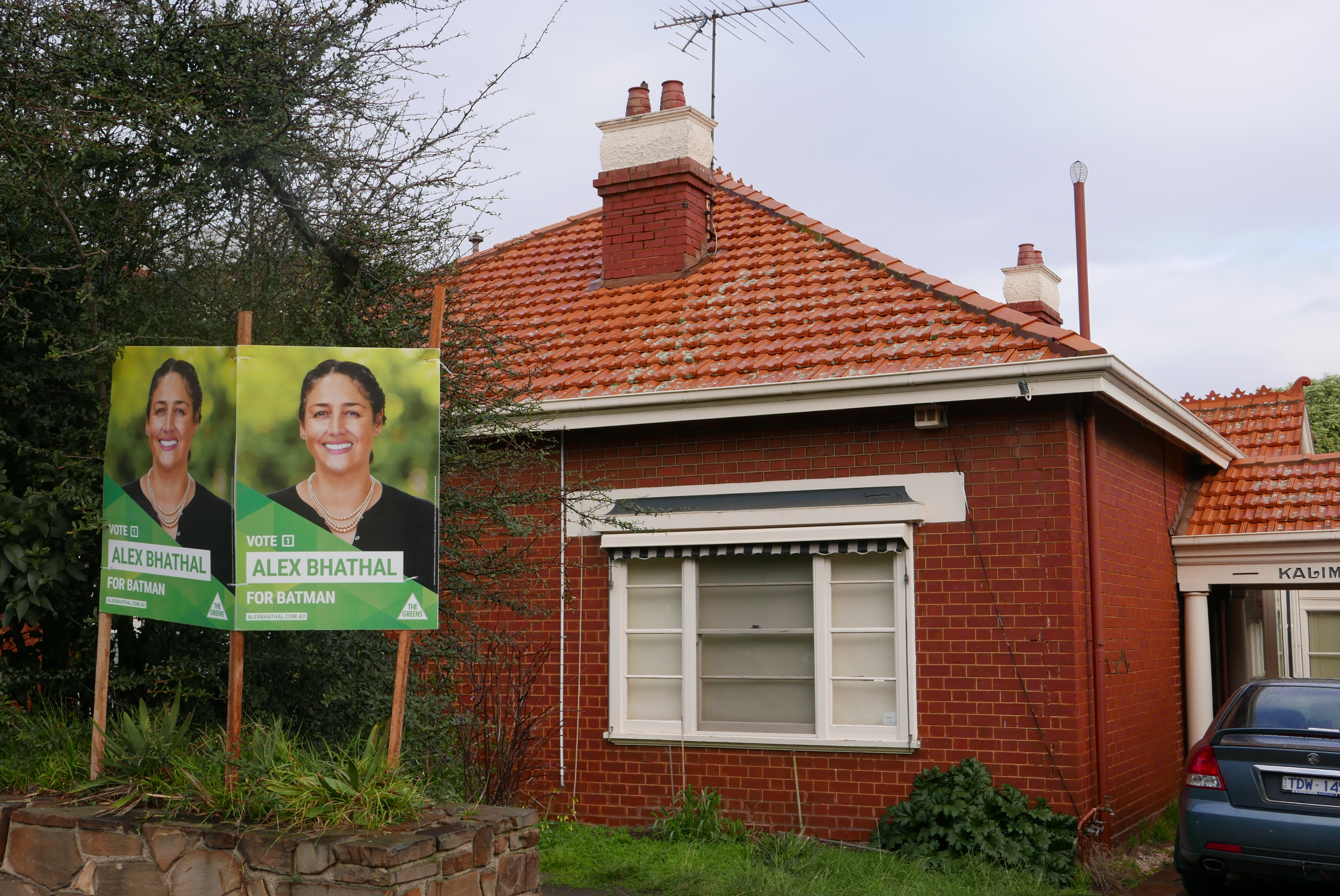
David Feeney's $2.3 million house in Northcote not declared on his parliamentary register of interests

- 17 May –
  - Immigration minister Peter Dutton makes controversial comments about refugees during an interview on Sky News, stating that "many... won't be numerate or literate in their own language let alone English", that they "would be taking Australian jobs" and that "they would languish in unemployment queues and on Medicare".
  - Labor MP for Batman, David Feeney, admits that he had not declared his ownership of a $2.3 million house in Northcote, and that the house was negatively-geared—a scheme that the Labor Party had promised to wind back if elected.
- 19 May –
  - Labor candidate for Moore David Leith steps down after social media posts from 2015 are revealed in which he called Australia's immigration detention centres "gulags".
  - The Australian Federal Police conducts raids on the Melbourne offices of Labor senator Stephen Conroy and the home of a Labor advisor, over the alleged leak of documents regarding the status of the National Broadband Network.
- 20 May –
  - Treasury and the Department of Finance release the Pre-election Economic and Fiscal Outlook (PEFO).
  - Liberal candidate for Fremantle, Sherry Sufi, withdraws from nomination following controversy over his past comments on same-sex marriage and indigenous constitutional recognition, as well as a video of him mocking WA Speaker Michael Sutherland.
- 24 May –
  - Treasurer Scott Morrison and finance minister Mathias Cormann hold a press conference in which they announce that their costing of Labor's policies has revealed a $67 billion "black hole". Under media questioning, Morrison replies that while they had made some assumptions to arrive at the figure, it is up to Labor to clarify its policies. The Opposition responds, calling the announcement a "ridiculous scare campaign" that was "riddled with a litany of errors".
  - Labor Senator Nova Peris announces she will not nominate to contest her Northern Territory Senate seat at the election.
- 25 May –
  - Liberal candidate for Whitlam, Dr Carolyn Currie, withdraws from nomination citing a lack of support from the party's branch and factional leaders.
  - A regional leaders' debate between Nationals leader and Deputy Prime Minister Barnaby Joyce, Labor MP Joel Fitzgibbon, and Greens leader Richard Di Natale is held in Goulburn, New South Wales. The debate is moderated by Chris Uhlmann and broadcast on the ABC. During the debate, Joyce makes comments apparently linking a ban on live cattle exports to Indonesia with an increase in asylum seeker boats under the Gillard government.
- 29 May – A leaders debate between Malcolm Turnbull and Bill Shorten is held at the National Press Club in Canberra.
- 9 June – Candidate nominations close.
- 11 June – Liberal candidate for Calwell, John Hsu, resigns and is disendorsed. The deadline for nominations having closed results in the Liberals not running a candidate in that seat. However, Hsu's name continues to be on the ballot paper and he continues to run as an independent.
- 14 June – Pre-poll voting opens.
- 17 June – A third leaders debate between Malcolm Turnbull and Bill Shorten.
- 19 June – Official launch of the ALP campaign.
- 20 June – Labor candidate for Farrer, Christian Kunde, resigns and is disendorsed.

=== Newspaper endorsements ===
In its pre-election editorial endorsements, the press overwhelmingly backed the Coalition over Labor—only the Sunday edition of the Melbourne Age endorsed the Labor Opposition.

==== Sunday editions ====
Newspaper	2016 owner	Endorsement
The Sun-Herald	Fairfax Media	Coalition
Sunday Telegraph	News Corp Australia	Coalition
Sunday Herald Sun	News Corp Australia	Coalition
Sunday Mail (Brisbane)	News Corp Australia	Coalition
Sunday Mail (Adelaide)	News Corp Australia	Coalition
Sunday Times	News Corp Australia	Coalition
Sunday Age	Fairfax Media	Labor

Among the Sunday papers, Turnbull was preferred by Sydney's Sun-Herald and Sunday Telegraph, Melbourne's Sunday Herald Sun, the Sunday Mail in Brisbane, the Sunday Times in Perth and the Sunday Mail in Adelaide. Labor won the endorsement of only the Sunday Age in Melbourne. The Sunday Tasmanian and Sunday Territorian did not publish endorsements prior to this election.

Labor's close ties to the union movement were of concern to many papers, even to the supportive Sunday Age, which described the issue as "vexed" and unresolved. Others went further, fearful that Shorten would not "free Labor from the union shackles that too often oppose sensible reforms," in the words of the Sun-Herald. "Mr Shorten still remains more union boss than potential prime minister," concluded the Sunday Telegraph. Shorten, the Sunday Herald Sun concurred, "is not a man to stand up to militant unions."

On the economy, there was general concern about the sustainability of Labor's approach to public spending. "Even an economic illiterate could see [Shorten's] 10-year economic "plan" was forged in fantasy land," opined the Sunday Times, "On this dangerous policy alone, Labor should not be given the opportunity to govern." The Sunday Age, however, took the view that increased taxation, and with it increased spending on education, should take priority: "a smarter society will be more productive." Though the Sun-Herald was supportive of some Labor policies, it said Shorten had failed to make "a compelling case that Australia needs a new government." Invoking the instability of Australian politics since 2010, the paper was unenthusiastic about electing "our sixth prime minister in six years." Turnbull, the Sun-Herald concluded, deserved "a chance to establish his own mandate."

The need for political stability was emphasised by the Perth Sunday Times and Adelaide Sunday Mail: at that time both states faced an uncertain future due to recent downturns in mining, steelmaking and shipbuilding. The expectation that any Labor government would govern in minority gave the Mail pause. Australia, it wrote, "needs stability ... this country has suffered enough through balance-of-power ... politicians". Both backed the Coalition as the best alternative to, in the Times words, "steer us through these turbulent times."

The Brisbane Sunday Mail summed up the general view among the papers of Turnbull: "yet to fulfil his promise as Prime Minister." Though the Sunday Telegraph agreed his government had been "timid", it concluded "We are fortunate to have as Prime Minister a man of integrity, decency and undoubted intellect."

==== National dailies ====
The Australian Financial Review endorsed the Coalition two days before polling day, in particular its plans to balance the federal budget, and boost economic growth by cutting company tax. Although the editorial viewed Turnbull's performance in office as "too timid", it concluded that "there is no alternative" but to support his re-election. The newspaper acknowledged Shorten's effectiveness as a campaigner, but it was scathing of the Opposition Leader's platform and tactics. His "resort to crass populism and the outdated politics of class comes from a once-reforming centre-left party which has refused to free itself from ... trade union and factional control," the editorial ran. "Mr Shorten's populist pitch echoes some of the global political phenomenon represented by Brexit and Donald Trump by exciting a squabble over shares of a declining income pie."

The Australian endorsed the Coalition the following day, highlighting the Government's budget discipline. Turnbull's "stolid pitch on frugality ... provided the contrast against which the Labor opposition could be judged," the editorial ran. Though it rated the Coalition's economic plan as "adequate at best," The Australian contrasted this with "an unthinkable Labor alternative that, even after the overblown GFC stimulus of the Rudd–Gillard–Rudd years, would respond to current challenges by spending more, taxing more and taking the nation deeper into debt."

==== Metropolitan dailies ====
Newspaper	2016 owner	Endorsement
Adelaide Advertiser	News Corp Australia	Coalition
Australian Financial Review	Fairfax Media	Coalition
Canberra Times	Fairfax Media	Coalition
Courier Mail	News Corp Australia	Coalition
Daily Telegraph	News Corp Australia	Coalition
Geelong Advertiser	News Corp Australia	Coalition
Herald Sun	News Corp Australia	Coalition
NT News	News Corp Australia	Coalition
Sydney Morning Herald	Fairfax Media	Coalition
The Age	Fairfax Media	Coalition
The Australian	News Corp Australia	Coalition
The West Australian	Seven West Media	Coalition

The metropolitan dailies backed the Coalition without exception. Turnbull's personal qualities and platform appealed more to the editors than his short record in office. The Age spoke for many in concluding that "Mr Turnbull deserves the chance to deliver". The Daily Telegraph praised the Prime Minister's "consistency ... He has stuck fast on addressing Australia's debt and deficit problems." Newspapers particularly highlighted, in the words of the West Australian, the Coalition's "better understanding of what is needed to run the economy and rein in debt." The Sydney Morning Herald welcomed the Coalition's curbs on superannuation tax breaks and offered qualified support for company tax cuts ("Businesses, small and large, create jobs.") The Age endorsed the super changes and company tax cut, but was critical of the Coalition's "shamefully harsh" border protection policies and planned same-sex marriage plebiscite. The Canberra Times gave the Coalition "credit for recognising the necessity for cuts in public-sector spending" and reforming super. The Courier-Mail backed Turnbull's 'jobs and growth' agenda as "a more coherent prescription in an era that demands experience, stability and certainty."

The Courier-Mail, Canberra Times, Age and Adelaide Advertiser acknowledged Shorten's strengths on the campaign trail. The Advertiser spoke of a "revitalised performance from Bill Shorten ... The Opposition is now in with a fighting chance." The Age welcomed its plans on negative gearing and capital gains tax; the Herald backed the case for Labor's higher increases in education funding.

However, for almost every paper, this was outweighed by the party's service of union interests and its unsustainable profligacy. "There is no sign at all that Mr Shorten will force Labor to remove the disproportionate influence of unions and their money on his party," the Herald wrote, regretting that despite the reforming instincts of Shadow Treasurer Chris Bowen, as a whole "Labor baulks at progress that affects the public service and unions." For the NT News, "the party's policy positions are incoherent. The sheer breadth of spending promises show Labor is not ready for government." The Herald Sun agreed that in Labor's "DNA is an inclination to spend ... That Australia must learn to live within its means is a lesson Labor still fails to grasp." The Herald chided Shorten for the dishonesty of his Medicare scare campaign ("his judgement was found wanting") as did the Courier-Mail ("hysteria"). The Daily Telegraph also highlighted Labor's record on border protection—50,000 illegal maritime arrivals and perhaps 1,000 deaths at sea—and noted the widespread desire of many Labor candidates and the Greens to "attempt this deadly experiment again."

Local issues and candidates also played a role in the endorsements. Expecting a Coalition victory, the NT News argued that Solomon Country Liberal MP Natasha Griggs should be returned on the grounds that Darwin was better off having a Government member as its representative. Victoria's Herald Sun highlighted the Country Fire Authority dispute—"a window into the relationship between Labor and the union movement" and "a game changer in how many Victorians will vote." The Hobart Mercury concluded that although the nation would be "best served" by a Coalition government, Denison independent MP Andrew Wilkie and Franklin Labor MP Julie Collins deserved to be re-elected as well. The Advertiser welcomed Turnbull's decision to build 12 new submarines in South Australia. The West Australian reminded voters to separate their judgement of Turnbull from their judgment of the less popular Liberal state government.

==== Campaign advertising ====
Campaign advertising began in February, with the Government airing taxpayer-funded commercials for its Innovation and Science Agenda that echoed Turnbull's catchphrase "exciting time". The ads were criticised by the Opposition, which referred the matter to the Auditor-General for investigation.

The first negative shots in the campaign's television advertising war were fired in April, as the Government worked to obtain its second trigger for a double dissolution.

- "If Malcolm Turnbull gets his way" was created by the Construction, Forestry, Mining & Energy Union. The ad depicted a drug dealer and a construction worker in police interview rooms, and claimed that if the ABCC was re-established as the Coalition intended, "a worker will have less rights than an ice dealer."
- "Bob Hawke speaks out for Medicare" (Labor). This attack ad, released on 11 June, featured former Prime Minister Bob Hawke claiming that Turnbull would "privatise" Medicare. Hawke, making his first appearance in a campaign ad since 1990, referred to a "Medicare privatisation taskforce" established by the Coalition. Hawke's claims were rejected by the Government, the Australian Medical Association and the Royal Australian College of General Practitioners. Though Turnbull labelled it the "biggest lie" of the campaign, the government cancelled plans to outsource management of the Medicare card-related electronic payments system.
- "Labor's war on the economy" (Liberal). This attack ad, released on 19 June, featured a supposed tradesman warning of what he characterised as Labor's desire to "go to war" with banks, mining companies and people with investment properties. Labor, union officials and many on social media initially dismissed the tradesman as "Fake Tradie".
- "Not this time, Tony" (The Nationals). The Nationals faced a strong challenge in their leader's seat of New England from independent former MP Tony Windsor. The party released an attack ad on 25 June that the previously conservative Windsor had supported the minority Labor government from 2010 to 2013. The ad used the metaphor of an unfaithful ex-boyfriend asking for a second chance—with the woman replying by text message 'Not this time, Tony'. Windsor claimed the ad accused him of sexual infidelity, a suggestion rejected by the Nationals.
- Member for Kennedy Bob Katter posted a video to YouTube on 14 June showing two people labelled 'Labor' and 'Liberal' putting up a 'For Sale' sign on Australia before cutting to a shot of the two lying on the ground while Katter himself held a gun facing the camera. Although Katter claimed the video was humorous, it attracted controversy as it was aired a few days after the Orlando nightclub shooting. The ad was created with the help of the writers of satirical newspaper website The Betoota Advocate.

In addition to the major political parties, other organisations aired their own issue ads. These included the Australian Council of Trade Unions, the Royal Australian College of General Practitioners, Master Builders Australia and The Australia Institute.

In Australian federal elections, a "blackout" of campaign ads on radio and television applies from midnight on the Wednesday before polling day. On the eve of the blackout in 2016, commercial television stations, media analysts and some politicians called for this rule to be reviewed in the light of declining audience share for traditional broadcasters, and the growing role of the internet in campaigning.

== Retiring members ==
=== Labor ===
- Anna Burke MP (Chisholm, Vic) – announced retirement 16 December 2015
- Laurie Ferguson MP (Werriwa, NSW) – announced retirement 12 August 2014
- Gary Gray MP (Brand, WA) – announced retirement 16 February 2016
- Alan Griffin MP (Bruce, Vic) – announced retirement 10 February 2015
- Jill Hall MP (Shortland, NSW) announced retirement 28 February 2016
- Alannah MacTiernan MP (Perth, WA) – announced retirement 12 February 2016
- Melissa Parke MP (Fremantle, WA) – announced retirement 22 January 2016
- Bernie Ripoll MP (Oxley, Qld) – announced retirement 14 April 2015
- Kelvin Thomson MP (Wills, Vic) – announced retirement 10 November 2015
- Senator Joe Ludwig (Qld) – announced retirement 9 March 2015
- Senator Jan McLucas (Qld) – announced retirement 5 April 2015
- Senator Nova Peris (NT) – announced retirement 24 May 2016

=== Liberal ===
- Bob Baldwin MP (Paterson, NSW) – announced retirement 16 April 2016
- Bruce Billson MP (Dunkley, Vic) – announced retirement 24 November 2015
- Bronwyn Bishop MP (Mackellar, NSW) – lost preselection 16 April 2016, delivered valedictory speech 4 May 2016
- Mal Brough MP (Fisher, Qld) – announced retirement 26 February 2016
- Teresa Gambaro MP (Brisbane, Qld) – announced retirement 9 March 2016
- Ian Macfarlane MP (Groom, Qld) – announced retirement 15 February 2016
- Andrew Robb MP (Goldstein, Vic) – announced retirement 10 February 2016
- Philip Ruddock MP (Berowra, NSW) – announced retirement 8 February 2016
- Andrew Southcott MP (Boothby, SA) – announced retirement 4 September 2015
- Sharman Stone MP (Murray, Vic) – announced retirement 26 March 2016
- Senator Bill Heffernan (NSW) – announced retirement 19 February 2016

=== National ===
- John Cobb MP (Calare, NSW) – announced retirement 27 February 2016
- Bruce Scott MP (Maranoa, Qld) – announced retirement 3 August 2015
- Warren Truss MP (Wide Bay, Qld) – announced retirement 11 February 2016

=== Palmer United ===
- Clive Palmer MP (Fairfax, Qld) – announced retirement 4 May 2016, ruled out Senate candidacy 23 May 2016

== Opinion polls ==
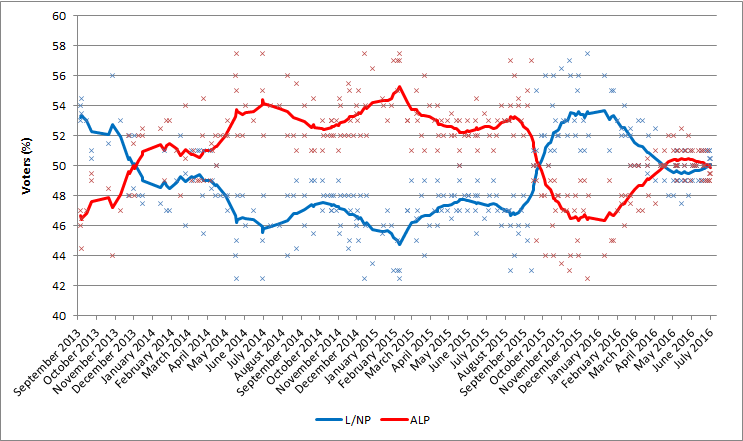
Two-party-preferred vote.

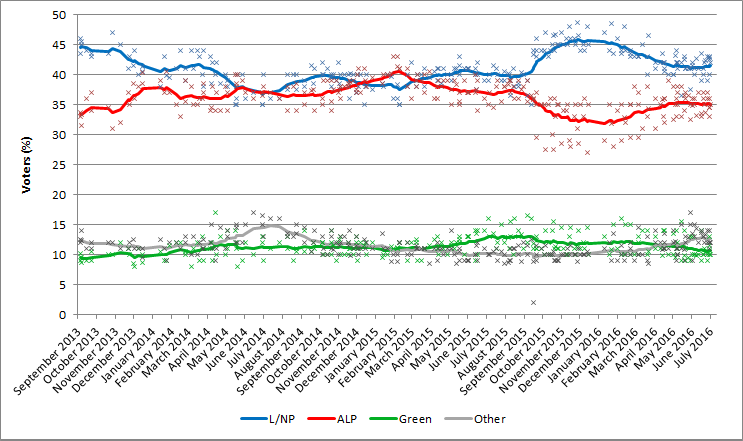
Primary vote.

Aggregate data of voting intention from all opinion polling since the last election. A moving average is shown in a solid line.

== Candidates ==
At the close of nominations on 9 June 2016, there were 1,625 candidates in total—994 for the House of Representatives and 631 for the Senate. The number of Senate candidates was the highest ever at an Australian election, increased from 529 in 2013.

== Marginal seat pendulum ==
Based on the post-election pendulum for the 2013 Australian federal election, this Mackerras pendulum was updated to include new notional margin estimates due to redistributions in New South Wales, Western Australia and the Australian Capital Territory. The net effect of the redistributions reduced the Liberal/National Coalition from 90 to a notional 88 seats and increased Labor from 55 to a notional 57 seats.

While every federal election after 1961 has been won by those that also won the majority of federal seats in New South Wales, unusually nearly half of all marginal government seats are in New South Wales at this election, of which nearly half are in Western Sydney and the other half in rural and regional areas, and with no more than a few seats each in every other state.

Assuming a theoretical uniform swing, for the Labor opposition to get to 76 seats and majority government would require Labor with 50.5 per cent of the two-party vote from a 4.0-point two-party swing or greater, while for the incumbent Coalition to lose majority government would require the Coalition with 50.2 per cent of the two-party vote from a 3.3-point two-party swing or greater.

Members in italics retired at the election

Marginal Coalition seats
Petrie (Qld)	Luke Howarth	LNP	0.5
Capricornia (Qld)	Michelle Landry	LNP	0.8
O'Connor (WA)	Rick Wilson	LIB	0.9 ^{[a]}
Lyons (Tas)	Eric Hutchinson	LIB	1.2
Solomon (NT)	Natasha Griggs	CLP	1.4
Hindmarsh (SA)	Matt Williams	LIB	1.9
Braddon (Tas)	Brett Whiteley	LIB	2.6
Banks (NSW)	David Coleman	LIB	2.8
Eden-Monaro (NSW)	Peter Hendy	LIB	2.9
Lindsay (NSW)	Fiona Scott	LIB	3.0
Page (NSW)	Kevin Hogan	NAT	3.1
Robertson (NSW)	Lucy Wicks	LIB	3.1
Deakin (Vic)	Michael Sukkar	LIB	3.2
Macarthur (NSW)	Russell Matheson	LIB	3.3
^^^ Government loses majority on a uniform swing ^^^
Reid (NSW)	Craig Laundy	LIB	3.3
Bonner (Qld)	Ross Vasta	LNP	3.7
Gilmore (NSW)	Ann Sudmalis	LIB	3.8
Corangamite (Vic)	Sarah Henderson	LIB	3.9
Durack (WA)	Melissa Price	LIB	3.9 ^{[a]}
La Trobe (Vic)	Jason Wood	LIB	4.0
Bass (Tas)	Andrew Nikolic	LIB	4.0
^^^ Opposition wins majority on a uniform swing ^^^
Brisbane (Qld)	Teresa Gambaro	LNP	4.3
Forde (Qld)	Bert van Manen	LNP	4.4
Cowan (WA)	Luke Simpkins	LIB	4.5
Macquarie (NSW)	Louise Markus	LIB	4.5
Dunkley (Vic)	Bruce Billson	LIB	5.6
Leichhardt (Qld)	Warren Entsch	LNP	5.7

Marginal Labor seats
Dobell (NSW)	Karen McNamara ^{[b]}	ALP	0.2
McEwen (Vic)	Rob Mitchell	ALP	0.2
Paterson (NSW)	Bob Baldwin ^{[b]}	ALP	0.3
Lingiari (NT)	Warren Snowdon	ALP	0.9
Bendigo (Vic)	Lisa Chesters	ALP	1.3
Lilley (Qld)	Wayne Swan	ALP	1.3
Parramatta (NSW)	Julie Owens	ALP	1.3
Chisholm (Vic)	Anna Burke	ALP	1.6
Moreton (Qld)	Graham Perrett	ALP	1.6
Richmond (NSW)	Justine Elliot	ALP	1.6
Bruce (Vic)	Alan Griffin	ALP	1.8
Perth (WA)	Alannah MacTiernan	ALP	2.2
Kingsford Smith (NSW)	Matt Thistlethwaite	ALP	2.7
Greenway (NSW)	Michelle Rowland	ALP	3.0
Griffith (Qld)	Terri Butler	ALP	3.0
Jagajaga (Vic)	Jenny Macklin	ALP	3.1
Wakefield (SA)	Nick Champion	ALP	3.4
Melbourne Ports (Vic)	Michael Danby	ALP	3.6
Brand (WA)	Gary Gray	ALP	3.7
Oxley (Qld)	Bernie Ripoll	ALP	3.8
Adelaide (SA)	Kate Ellis	ALP	3.9
Isaacs (Vic)	Mark Dreyfus	ALP	3.9
Barton (NSW)	Nickolas Varvaris ^{[b]}	ALP	4.4
McMahon (NSW)	Chris Bowen	ALP	4.6
Rankin (Qld)	Jim Chalmers	ALP	4.8
Ballarat (Vic)	Catherine King	ALP	4.9
Franklin (Tas)	Julie Collins	ALP	5.1
Makin (SA)	Tony Zappia	ALP	5.1
Blair (Qld)	Shayne Neumann	ALP	5.3
Fremantle (WA)	Melissa Parke	ALP	5.4
Hunter (NSW) ^{[c]}	Joel Fitzgibbon	ALP	5.7

^{a} Though the seats of O'Connor and Durack are marginal Liberal seats, margins are based on the two-candidate preferred result against the National Party of Australia (WA) rather than the two-party preferred result against Labor, on which all other marginal seats are based. O'Connor and Durack are not included for Labor majority calculation but are included for Coalition loss of majority calculation.

^{b} Though the seats of Dobell, Paterson and Barton were Liberal wins at the previous election, redistributions changed them to notionally marginal Labor seats.

^{c} Pat Conroy is the current MP for the Division of Charlton which is being renamed the Division of Hunter at the next election.

== Results ==
=== House of Representatives ===
Unusually, the outcome could not be predicted the day after the election, with many close seats in doubt. After a week of vote counting, no party had won enough seats in the House of Representatives to form a majority government. Neither the Liberal/National Coalition's incumbent Turnbull government nor the Australian Labor Party's Shorten Opposition were in a position to claim victory. During the uncertain week following the election, contradicting his earlier statements, Turnbull negotiated with the crossbench. He secured confidence and supply support from Bob Katter, Andrew Wilkie and Cathy McGowan in the event of a hung parliament and resulting minority government, as seen in 2010. On 10 July, Shorten conceded defeat, acknowledging that the Coalition had enough seats to form either minority or majority government. Turnbull claimed victory later that day. In the closest federal majority result since 1961, the ABC declared on 11 July that the Coalition could form a one-seat majority government.

Government (76) Coalition Liberal (45) LNP (21) (Note: 15 LNP MPs sit in the Liberal party room and 6 in the National party room) National (10) Opposition (69) Labor (69) Crossbench (5) Greens (1) Xenophon (1) Katter (1) Independent (2) (Note: independent MPs: Andrew Wilkie (Denison) and Cathy McGowan (Indi).)

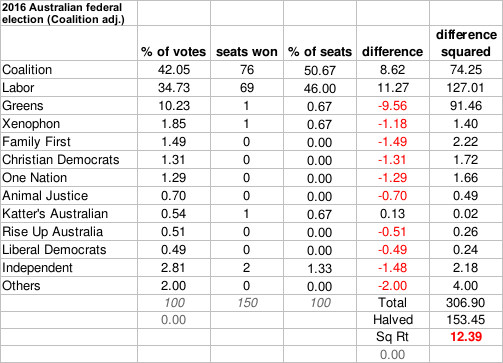
According to the 1−100 Gallagher Index, the disproportionality in the lower house is comparatively high at about 12.7 in 2016 − compared to 9.7 in 2013, 11.3 in 2010 and 10.3 in 2007.

House of Representatives (IRV) — Turnout 91.01% (CV) — Informal 5.05%
Party	Votes	%	Swing	Seats	Change
Australian Labor Party	4,702,296	34.73	+1.35	69	▲14
Coalition	5,693,605	42.04	−3.51	76	▼14
Liberal Party of Australia	3,882,905	28.67	−3.35	45	▼13
Liberal National Party (QLD)	1,153,736	8.52	−0.40	21	▼1
National Party of Australia	624,555	4.61	+0.32	10	▲1
Country Liberal Party (NT)	32,409	0.24	−0.08	0	▼1
Australian Greens	1,385,650	10.23	+1.58	1	Steady
Nick Xenophon Team	250,333	1.85	+1.85	1	▲1
Katter's Australian Party	72,879	0.54	−0.50	1	Steady
Palmer United Party	315	0.00	−5.49	0	▼1
Others	1,436,023	10.60	+4.78	2 (Note: The Independent members were Cathy McGowan (Indi, Vic) and Andrew Wilkie (Denison, Tas).)	Steady
Total	13,541,101			150	
Two-party-preferred vote
Liberal/National Coalition	6,818,824	50.36	−3.13	76	▼14
Australian Labor Party	6,722,277	49.64	+3.13	69	▲14
Invalid/blank votes	131,722	4.70	−0.86		
Total votes	14,262,016				
Registered voters/turnout	15,671,551	91.01	–2.22		
Source: Federal Election 2016

=== Senate ===
The final Senate result was announced on 4 August. The incumbent Liberal/National Coalition government won 30 seats, a net loss of three—the Coalition lost four Senators, one each from New South Wales, Queensland, Western Australia and South Australia, but gained a Senator in Victoria. The Coalition later lost South Australian Liberal Senator Cory Bernardi, who quit to form the Australian Conservatives party and thus join the Crossbench. The Labor opposition won 26 seats, a gain of one—a Senator in Western Australia. The number of crossbenchers increased by two to a record 20. The Liberal/National Coalition required at least ten additional votes to reach a Senate majority, an increase of four.

Government (30) Coalition Liberal (21) LNP (5) (Note: 3 LNP Senators sit in the Liberal party room and 2 in the National party room) National (3) CLP (1) (Note: Sits in National party room) Opposition (26) Labor (26) Crossbench (20) Green (9) One Nation (4) Xenophon (3) Family First (1) Liberal Democrat (1) Lambie (1) Hinch (1)

Senate (STV OPV) – Turnout 91.93% (CV) – Informal 3.94%
Party	Votes	%	Swing	Seats won	Change
Liberal–National Coalition	4,868,246	35.18	–1.32	30	▼3
Liberal/National joint ticket	2,769,426	20.01	−1.16	10	Steady
Liberal	1,066,579	7.71	+0.77	14	▼2
Liberal National	960,467	6.94	−1.16	5	▼1
Country Liberal	37,156	0.27	−0.05	1	Steady
National (WA)	34,618	0.25	−0.06	0	Steady
Labor	4,123,084	29.79	+0.16	26	▲1
Greens	1,197,657	8.65	−0.58	9	▼1
One Nation	593,013	4.29	+3.76	4	▲4
Xenophon Team	456,369	3.30	+1.37	3	▲2
Liberal Democrats	298,915	2.16	–1.59	1	Steady
Justice	266,607	1.93	+1.93	1	▲1
Family First	191,112	1.38	+0.26	1	Steady
Democratic Labour	94,510	0.68	–0.18	0	▼1
Lambie Network	69,074	0.50	+0.50	1	▲1
Motoring Enthusiasts	53,232	0.38	–0.12	0	▼1
Palmer United	26,210	0.19	–5.42	0	▼3
Others	1,601,481	11.57	+1.25		
Total	13,838,900			76	
Invalid/blank votes	567,806	3.94	+1.01		
Registered voters/turnout	15,671,551	91.93	–1.52		
Source: Federal Election 2016

States and territories
Party	NSW	Vic	Qld	WA	SA	Tas	ACT	NT	Total
Liberal/National Coalition	5	5	5	5	4	4	1	1	30
Australian Labor Party	4	4	4	4	3	5	1	1	26
Australian Greens	1	2	1	2	1	2			9
Pauline Hanson's One Nation	1		2	1					4
Nick Xenophon Team					3				3
Derryn Hinch's Justice Party		1							1
Jacqui Lambie Network						1			1
Liberal Democratic Party	1								1
Family First Party					1				1
Total	12	12	12	12	12	12	2	2	76

== Seats changing hands ==
Members in italics did not re-contest their House of Representatives seats at this election.

Seat	2013			Notional margin (Note: For seats that werre affected by the redistribution the Australian Electoral Commission calculated "notional" margins for the redistributed divisions by modelling the outcome of the previous election as if the new boundaries had been in place.)	Swing	2016		
Seat	Party	Member	Margin	Notional margin		Margin	Member	Party
Barton, NSW (Note: As a result of the 2015 boundary redistribution, the New South Wales Liberal-held seats of Barton, Dobell and Paterson became notionally marginal Labor seats.)	Liberal	Nickolas Varvaris	7.17	−4.39	3.91	8.30	Linda Burney	Labor
Bass, TAS	Liberal	Andrew Nikolic	4.04		10.13	6.09	Ross Hart	Labor
Braddon, TAS	Liberal	Brett Whiteley	2.56		4.76	2.20	Justine Keay	Labor
Burt, WA	Liberal	New seat notional		6.09	13.20	7.11	Matt Keogh	Labor
Chisholm, VIC	Labor	Anna Burke	1.60		2.84	1.24	Julia Banks	Liberal
Cowan, WA	Liberal	Luke Simpkins	7.46	4.52	5.20	0.68	Anne Aly	Labor
Dobell, NSW	Liberal	Karen McNamara	0.68	−0.18	4.63	4.81	Emma McBride	Labor
Eden-Monaro, NSW	Liberal	Peter Hendy	0.61	2.91	5.84	2.93	Mike Kelly	Labor
Fairfax, QLD	Palmer United	Clive Palmer	0.03		N/A	10.89	Ted O'Brien	Liberal National
Herbert, QLD	Liberal National	Ewen Jones	6.17		6.19	0.02	Cathy O'Toole	Labor
Hindmarsh, SA	Liberal	Matt Williams	1.89		2.47	0.58	Steve Georganas	Labor
Lindsay, NSW	Liberal	Fiona Scott	2.99		4.10	1.11	Emma Husar	Labor
Longman, QLD	Liberal National	Wyatt Roy	6.92		7.71	0.79	Susan Lamb	Labor
Lyons, TAS	Liberal	Eric Hutchinson	1.22		3.53	2.31	Brian Mitchell	Labor
Macarthur, NSW	Liberal	Russell Matheson	11.36	3.39	11.72	8.33	Mike Freelander	Labor
Macquarie, NSW	Liberal	Louise Markus	4.48		6.67	2.19	Susan Templeman	Labor
Mayo, SA	Liberal	Jamie Briggs	12.51		N/A	4.97	Rebekha Sharkie	Nick Xenophon Team
Murray, VIC	Liberal	Sharman Stone	20.87		N/A	5.13	Damian Drum	National
Paterson, NSW	Liberal	Bob Baldwin	9.78	−0.27	10.47	10.74	Meryl Swanson	Labor
Solomon, NT	Country Liberal	Natasha Griggs	1.40		7.40	6.00	Luke Gosling	Labor
Throsby, NSW	Labor	Stephen Jones	7.77	Division abolished				

== See also ==
- 2017–18 Australian parliamentary eligibility crisis
- Elections in Australia
- 2019 Australian federal election
