= Emma McBride =

Australian politician (born 1975)

The Honourable Emma McBride MP
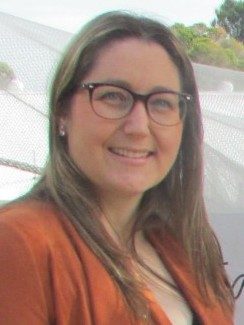
- McBride in 2017

Assistant Minister for Mental Health and Suicide Prevention
- Incumbent
- Assumed office 1 June 2022
- Prime Minister: Anthony Albanese
- Preceded by: David Coleman

Assistant Minister for Rural and Regional Health
- Incumbent
- Assumed office 1 June 2022
- Prime Minister: Anthony Albanese
- Preceded by: (position established)

Member of the Australian Parliament for Dobell
- Incumbent
- Assumed office 2 July 2016
- Preceded by: Karen McNamara

Personal details
- Born: 27 April 1975 (age 51) Sydney, New South Wales, Australia
- Party: Labor
- Parent: Grant McBride (father)
- Occupation: Pharmacist
- Profession: Politician
- Website: www.emmamcbride.com.au

Emma Margaret McBride (born 27 April 1975) is an Australian politician. She was elected as the member for Dobell in the Australian House of Representatives in the 2016 election after having been an unsuccessful candidate for the same seat in the 2013 election.

== Early life ==
McBride was born in Sydney on 27 April 1975. She is the second of eight children born to Barbara and Grant McBride. Her paternal grandfather was born in Northern Ireland, and she obtained Irish citizenship by descent in 2001 but renounced it prior to standing for parliament in 2013. As a child, McBride lived for periods in Western Sydney, the Inner West, Nauru, and the Central Coast. Her father was elected to the New South Wales Legislative Assembly in 1992.

McBride completed a Bachelor of Pharmacy at the University of Sydney and a graduate diploma in public sector management at Flinders University.

== Early career ==
After graduating she worked around New South Wales, spending periods in Forbes, North Sydney, Newtown, Berkeley Vale, and Belmont, as well as in Oxford, England. In 2006, McBride returned to the Central Coast as a specialist mental health pharmacist at Wyong Hospital. In 2008, she became the hospital's chief pharmacist. She was also a director of the Wyong Community Bank branch of Bendigo Bank and a board member of the Central Coast Heart netball team.

== Political career ==
McBride joined the ALP in 1992. She served on the Wyong Shire Council from 2008 to 2012.

In August 2013, McBride won ALP preselection for the federal seat of Dobell, succeeding the incumbent MP Craig Thomson who had been suspended from the party in 2012. She was defeated by the Liberal candidate Karen McNamara at the 2013 federal election, but reprised her candidacy in 2016 and was successful.

After the 2019 federal election, McBride was included in Anthony Albanese's shadow ministry as a shadow assistant minister in the mental health and carers portfolios. She was appointed deputy chair of the House Standing Committee on Communications and the Arts in December 2020 and of the Select Committee on Mental Health and Suicide Prevention in February 2021.

McBride was re-elected at the 2022 federal election, and was appointed Assistant Minister for Mental Health and Suicide Prevention and Assistant Minister for Rural and Regional Health by Prime Minister Anthony Albanese. She was re-appointed to the same roles in the second Albanese ministry after the Labor government's re-election at the 2025 federal election.

Parliament of Australia
| Preceded by Karen McNamara | Member for Dobell; 2016–present | Incumbent |
