= Electoral district of Tuggerah =

Former state electoral district of New South Wales, Australia

Tuggerah was an electoral district for the Legislative Assembly in the Australian State of New South Wales, which partly replaced Munmorah in 1981 and was named after the Tuggerah Lakes. In 1988, it was replaced by Wyong and The Entrance. Its only member was Harry Moore, representing the Labor Party.

== Members for Tuggerah ==
Member	Party	Term
Harry Moore	Labor	1981–1988

== Election results ==
1984 New South Wales state election: Tuggerah
Party	Candidate	Votes	%	±%
Labor	Harry Moore	18,345	55.8	−3.3
Liberal	Leslie Nunn	10,416	31.7	+2.1
Independent	Clem Payne	2,664	8.1	+8.1
Democrats	Lynn Sawyer	1,438	4.4	−6.9
Total formal votes		32,863	97.7	+0.4
Informal votes		766	2.3	−0.4
Turnout		33,629	93.2	+2.2
Two-party-preferred result
Labor	Harry Moore		61.8	−5.0
Liberal	Leslie Nunn		38.2	+5.0
Labor hold		Swing	−5.0	
