= Ken Ticehurst =

Australian politician

Member of the Australian Parliament for Dobell
- In office 10 November 2001 – 24 November 2007
- Preceded by: Michael Lee
- Succeeded by: Craig Thomson

Personal details
- Born: 22 January 1945 (age 81) Forbes, New South Wales, Australia
- Party: Liberal Party of Australia (2001–2007)
- Spouse(s): Trisha (died); Susanne (m. 2010)

Kenneth Vincent Ticehurst (born 22 January 1945) is a former Australian politician, and was a member of the Australian House of Representatives from November 2001 to 2007, representing the Division of Dobell in New South Wales for the Liberal Party of Australia.

== Biography ==
Ticehurst has a qualification in electrical engineering. He worked as a manager in marketing and sales, technical and manufacturing and as a managing director before entering politics. Commenced Kattron, a trading name for his real time Lightning Tracking service, in 1990. Produced first commercial lightning data service in Australia in December 1991. Formed a partnership with WeatherBug of USA to install and operate 21st Century Lightning Tracking equipment.

== Electoral career ==
At the 2001 federal election, Ticehurst was preselected and contested the marginal seat of Dobell held by the Labor Party since its creation in 1984. Ticehurst won the seat with a slim majority of 560 votes, defeating Labor frontbencher Michael Lee.

At the 2004 election, Ticehurst improved his margin, winning by 8904 votes two party preferred. At the 2007 election, Ticehurst campaigned as time permitted, due to the ailing health of wife Trisha, who was in the later stages of aggressive cancer. He was defeated by Labor Party candidate Craig Thomson. His wife died shortly after his electoral defeat. He remarried in 2010.

== Parliamentary career ==
- Standing Committees (REPS)
  - Communications, Information Technology and the Arts
  - Environment and Heritage
  - Family and Human Services
- Government Backbench Policy
  - Health and Ageing (Chairperson)
  - Communications, Information Technology and the Arts
  - Education, Science & Training
  - Environment and Water Resources
  - Transport, Regional Services, Territories and Local Government
  - Employment, Workplace Relations & Workforce Participation

Parliament of Australia
Preceded by Michael Lee	Member for Dobell; 2001–2007	Succeeded by Craig Thomson
