= David Harris (Australian politician) =

Australian politician (born 1966)

David Harris MP
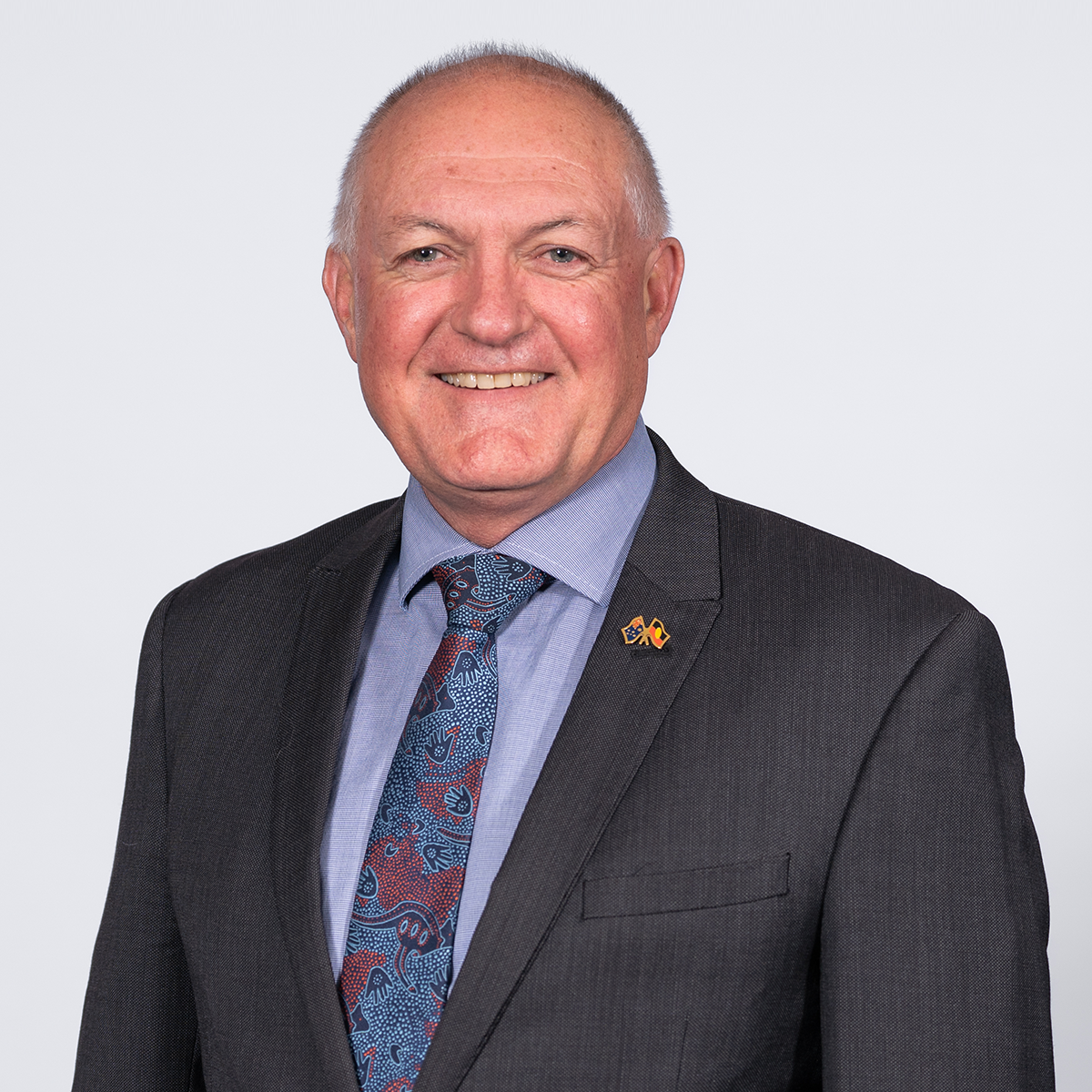

Minister for Aboriginal Affairs and Treaty
- Incumbent
- Assumed office 5 April 2023
- Premier: Chris Minns
- Preceded by: Ben Franklin

Minister for Gaming and Racing
- Incumbent
- Assumed office 5 April 2023
- Premier: Chris Minns
- Preceded by: Kevin Anderson (as Minister for Hospitality and Racing)

Minister for Medical Research
- Incumbent
- Assumed office 5 April 2023
- Premier: Chris Minns
- Preceded by: Brad Hazzard (as Minister for Health)

Minister for the Central Coast
- Incumbent
- Assumed office 5 April 2023
- Premier: Chris Minns
- Preceded by: Adam Crouch (as Parliamentary Secretary for the Central Coast)

Minister for Veterans
- Incumbent
- Assumed office 5 April 2023
- Premier: Chris Minns
- Preceded by: David Elliott

Member of the New South Wales Parliament for Wyong
- Incumbent
- Assumed office 28 March 2015
- Preceded by: Darren Webber
- In office 24 March 2007 – 4 March 2011
- Preceded by: Paul Crittenden
- Succeeded by: Darren Webber

Personal details
- Born: 24 February 1966 (age 60)
- Party: Labor Party
- Occupation: Primary school teacher
- Website: www.davidharrismp.com.au

David Robert Harris is an Australian politician. He has served as the New South Wales Minister for Aboriginal Affairs and Treaty, Gaming and Racing, Veterans, Medical Research and the Central Coast since April 2023. He has been a Labor Party member of the New South Wales Legislative Assembly since 2015, representing the electorate of Wyong. He previously represented the same electorate from 2007 to 2011.

== Personal life and early career ==
Harris is one of three children and grew up in Greenacre in Sydney. His parents later moved to the New South Wales Central Coast.

Harris attended Woy Woy South Public School and Woy Woy High School, where became school captain.

In 1987, Harris joined the Umina branch of the Labor Party, eventually becoming the president of the Wyong branch, and then secretary of Dobell Federal Electoral Council.

Harris gained a Diploma of Teaching and began work in the public school system, starting his career at Griffith Public School in 1987. In the following year, he became the principal of a one-teacher school at Merriwagga, and moved on to teach at Hillston Central School. It was in Hillston that he met his wife Sherelle. Harris and Sherelle have two daughters.

Harris later returned to the Central Coast, becoming principal at Dooralong Public School and then deputy principal at Northlakes Public School. Harris was later appointed principal at Gwandalan Public School and then principal of Kariong Public School.

In 2006, Harris resigned as the principal to pursue a career in politics.

== First term in Parliament (2007–2011) ==
He was elected to the New South Wales Legislative Assembly on 24 March 2007 as the member for Wyong. He was appointed as a member of the Staysafe Committee (Joint Standing Committee on Road Safety) and a member of the Standing Committee on Broadband in Rural and Regional Communities. He was also deputy chair of the committee on the Independent Commission Against Corruption and chair of the Natural Resource Management (Climate Change) Committee.

In 2009, he served for three months as Parliamentary Secretary for the Central Coast under the Rees Government. In January 2010, he was appointed as Parliamentary Secretary Assisting the Minister for the Central Coast under the Keneally Government. In September 2010, he was also appointed as Parliamentary Secretary Assisting the Minister for Education and Training.

At the 2011 state election, Harris lost the seat of Wyong to his Liberal opponent, local small businessman Darren Webber. It was the first time the seat of Wyong had been held by any party other than Labor. Late in 2011, Harris was appointed as the new principal at Point Clare Public School, to begin in the new year.

== Return to Parliament ==
In 2015, Harris resigned from Point Clare to run for re-election in Wyong. Harris regained the seat from Darren Webber at the 2015 state election. Following this, he was appointed to the Shadow Ministry of Luke Foley as Shadow Minister for the Central Coast, Small Business, Skills and Regional Development.

Following the resignation of Linda Burney in 2016, Harris was appointed as Shadow Minister for Aboriginal Affairs. He retained the positions of Shadow Minister for the Central Coast and Regional Development but was succeeded as Shadow Minister for Skills by Prue Car and Shadow Minister for Small Business by Jenny Aitchison. Following the election of Michael Daley as Leader of the Opposition, Harris was also appointed as Shadow Assistant Minister for Education.

In 2019, Harris was appointed to the Shadow Ministry of Jodi McKay as Shadow Minister for Regional Transport, the Central Coast and Aboriginal Affairs and Treaty. At the inception of the Shadow Ministry of Chris Minns, Harris retained the Central Coast and Aboriginal Affairs and Treaty portfolios and succeeded Aitchison as Shadow Minister for Jobs, Investment and Tourism. Aitchison succeeded Harris as Shadow Minister for Regional Transport.

Following the election of the Minns Government at the 2023 state election, Harris was appointed as Minister for Aboriginal Affairs and Treaty, Minister for Gaming and Racing, Minister for Veterans, Minister for Medical Research and the Minister for the Central Coast.

New South Wales Legislative Assembly
Preceded by Paul Crittenden	Member for Wyong; 2007–2011	Succeeded by Darren Webber
Preceded by Darren Webber	Member for Wyong; 2015–present	Incumbent
