= Karen McNamara =

Australian politician

Karen McNamara MP

Member of the Australian Parliament for Dobell
- In office 7 September 2013 – 2 July 2016
- Preceded by: Craig Thomson
- Succeeded by: Emma McBride

Personal details
- Born: 23 April 1964 (age 62) Falkirk, Scotland
- Party: Liberal Party of Australia
- Spouse: John McNamara
- Children: 2 sons
- Occupation: Politician
- Website: www.karenmcnamara.com.au

Karen Jane McNamara (born 23 April 1964) is an Australian politician. She was a Liberal member of the Australian House of Representatives from 2013 to 2016, representing the New South Wales electorate of Dobell. She lost her seat at the 2016 election losing to Labor candidate Emma McBride

== Career ==
McNamara is a former New South Wales public servant, serving in senior roles for over 20 years. McNamara managed the electoral campaign of Darren Webber for the electorate of Wyong at the 2011 New South Wales state election. In 2013 Webber was forced to resign from the Liberal Party, due to irregularities in his electoral fundraising creating corruption concerns.

At the 2013 Australian federal election, McNamara won the Central Coast seat of Dobell, ousting sitting member, independent Craig Thomson, and narrowly defeating Labor candidate Emma McBride. At the 2016 election, McBride, the daughter of former state MP Grant McBride, turned the tables, defeating McNamara after achieving a swing of over four percent.

Parliament of Australia
Preceded by Craig Thomson	Member for Dobell; 2013–2016	Succeeded by Emma McBride
