= Paul Crittenden =

Australian politician

Paul Ronald Crittenden (born 31 January 1958) is a former ALP politician, elected as a member of the New South Wales Legislative Assembly for the Electoral district of Wyong from 1991 to 2007.

Crittenden was educated Broken Hill High School and Barraba Central School. He was awarded a BA from the University of New England and a M Com by the University of New South Wales. He was as a mathematics teacher from 1980 to 1983 and worked for the New South Wales Department of Education from 1983 to 1985 and the Department of Minerals and Energy from 1985 to 1991. He is married with two children.

== Notes ==
New South Wales Legislative Assembly
Preceded by Harry Moore	Member for Wyong; 1991 – 2007	Succeeded by David Harris
