= Michael Lee (Australian politician) =

Australian politician (born 1957)

The Honourable Michael Lee
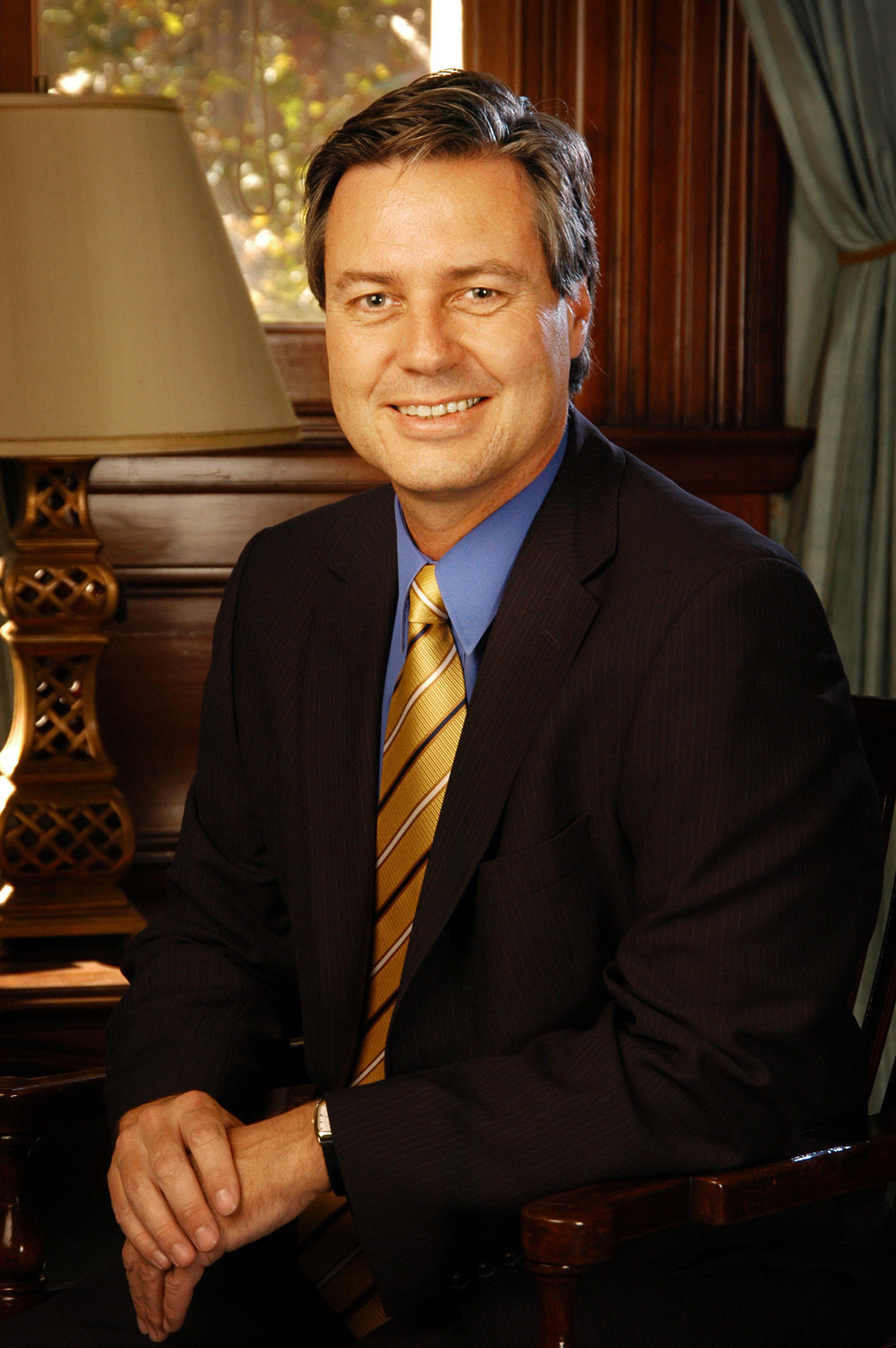
- Official portrait, 2004

Member of the Australian Parliament for Dobell
- In office 1 December 1984 – 10 November 2001
- Preceded by: New seat
- Succeeded by: Ken Ticehurst

Personal details
- Born: 24 March 1957 (age 69) Sydney
- Party: Australian Labor Party
- Education: University of New South Wales
- Occupation: Engineer

Michael John Lee (born 24 March 1957) is an Australian Labor politician. He was a member of the House of Representatives from 1984 to 2001, a minister in Paul Keating's government, and a member of the City of Sydney Council from 2004 to 2008.

== Early life and education ==
Lee was born in Sydney, where he grew up in the beachside suburb of Cronulla. Here, he attended De La Salle College, Cronulla. His immediate classmates included Steve Hutchins, a former Australian Senator, and John Della Bosca, formerly the NSW Minister for Health.

After graduating in electrical engineering from the University of New South Wales, Lee was employed as an engineer at the Munmorah Power Station and Vales Point Power Station on the Central Coast of New South Wales.

== Political career ==
He was subsequently elected as a Labor member of the Australian House of Representatives for the seat of Dobell, at the 1984 election, serving until being defeated at the 2001 election by Liberal candidate Ken Ticehurst.

In March 1993, Lee was appointed Minister for Tourism and Minister for Resources in the second Keating Ministry. In December 1993, he replaced Bob Collins and David Beddall as Minister for Communications. In January 1994, he gained responsibility for the arts.

As Arts Minister, his first shadow was Opposition Leader John Hewson who had also been the Shadow Arts Minister. He lost his ministerial responsibility with the defeat of the Keating government at the 1996 election. He was Shadow Minister for Health from 1996 to 1998 and shadow Minister for Education from 1998 to 2001. Following his defeat in 2001, he ran as the Labor candidate for Lord Mayor of Sydney in 2004, and was defeated by Clover Moore, but was elected to the council.

Lee became President of the New South Wales branch of the Australian Labor Party in 2010, following the resignation of Bernie Riordan.

Political offices
Preceded by Alan Griffiths	Minister for Tourism; 1993–96	Succeeded by Andrew Thomson
Preceded by Alan Griffiths	Minister for Resources; 1993	Succeeded by David Beddall
Preceded by Bob Collins and David Beddall	Minister for Communications (and the Arts); 1993–96	Succeeded by Richard Alston
Parliament of Australia
New division	Member for Dobell; 1984–2001	Succeeded by Ken Ticehurst
