= Darren Webber =

Australian politician

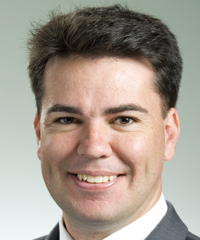

Member of the New South Wales Parliament for Wyong
- In office 26 March 2011 – 6 March 2015
- Preceded by: David Harris
- Succeeded by: David Harris

Personal details
- Born: 29 June 1981 (age 45) Gosford, Australia
- Party: Independent (2014–2015)
- Other political affiliations: Liberal (2011–2014)

Darren James Webber (born 29 June 1981), an Australian politician, was a member of the New South Wales Legislative Assembly representing Wyong on the Central Coast for the Liberal Party from the 2011 New South Wales state election until 19 February 2014 when he moved to the parliamentary crossbench and sat as an independent after the Independent Commission Against Corruption heard evidence that Webber may have breached electoral funding laws. He retired from politics in 2015.

== Early career and background ==
With a family history in the area dating back over sixty years, Webber attended primary school at Berkeley Vale and attended Terrigal High School From year seven to year twelve, graduating in 1999, going onto a trade school at Wyong. He was originally apprenticed as a smallgoods butcher, but terminated that and became an apprentice electrician, apparently not finishing that apprenticeship either. Webber owned a business installing home theatre systems and had a long involvement with local surf life saving clubs. While working, Webber was involved in a serious workplace accident and says he "experienced first hand the poor state of our hospitals", which subsequently led to his decision to run for office.

== Political career ==
Preselected in 2010 by the Liberal Party, Webber is single and used this to his advantage during the election campaign by handing roses to potential voters on Valentine's Day which fell a month before polling day. At the 2011 state election, Webber was elected with a swing of 14.3 points and won the seat with 52.6 per cent of the two-party vote, and is the first Liberal to represent Wyong. Webber's main opponent was the sitting Labor member, David Harris.

In February 2014, the Independent Commission Against Corruption (ICAC) commenced investigating allegations of corrupt conduct. In response to the inquiry, the Liberal partyroom began the process of suspending MPs including Webber from the parliamentary party, even though they had just renominated for their seats. Before this process began, Webber and others resigned from the Liberal Party to sit as independents. Webber did not contest the March 2015 state election.

New South Wales Legislative Assembly
| Preceded by David Harris | Member for Wyong; 2011–2015 | Succeeded by David Harris |
