= Harry Moore (Australian politician) =

Australian politician

Harry Frank Moore, OAM (29 March 1924 – 14 August 2009) was an Australian Labor Party politician, elected as a member of the New South Wales Legislative Assembly for the Tuggerah from 1981 to 1988 and for Wyong from 1988 to 1991.

Moore was a veteran of World War II, in which he served in the Australian Army in the Pacific. In 1989, he was responsible for new laws in the New South Wales Parliament which legalised the traditional soldier's game of Two-up on Anzac Day each year.

Moore was awarded a Medal of the Order of Australia in 1993 in recognition of his community service, and the Centenary Medal for his service to politics in 2001. He died in August 2009 from pneumonia.

New South Wales Legislative Assembly
New district	Member for Tuggerah; 1981–1988	Replaced by Wyong & The Entrance
New district	Member for Wyong; 1988–1991	Succeeded by Paul Crittenden
