= Craig Thomson (politician) =

Australian former politician

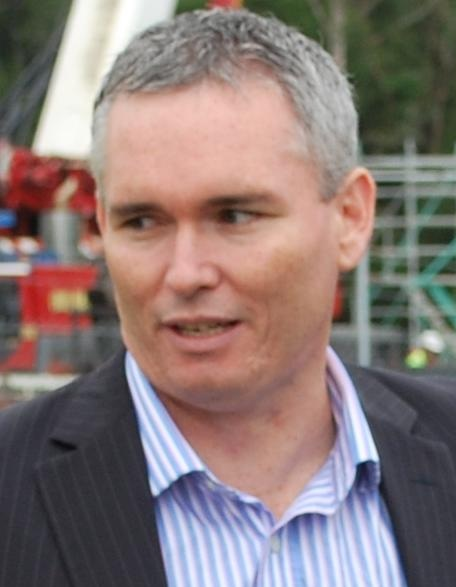

Member of the Australian Parliament for Dobell
- In office 24 November 2007 – 7 September 2013
- Preceded by: Ken Ticehurst
- Succeeded by: Karen McNamara

Personal details
- Born: Craig Robert Thomson; 31 July 1964 (age 62) Wellington, New Zealand
- Party: Independent (2012–2013)
- Other political affiliations: Labor (2007–2012)
- Spouse(s): Lynette Sharma (separated) Christa Zoe Arnold (m. 2011; sep. 2022)
- Children: Matilda Thomson, Adelaide Thomson, Florence Thomson,
- Education: University of New South Wales
- Occupation: Trade unionist Politician

Craig Robert Thomson (born 31 July 1964) is an Australian former trade union official and a former politician implicated in the Health Services Union expenses affair.

Thomson was the national secretary of the Health Services Union from 2002 until the 2007 federal election when he was elected to the House of Representatives as member for the Division of Dobell, New South Wales, for the Australian Labor Party. In April 2012 he announced his intention to sit on the crossbench as an independent member of parliament. Thomson lost his seat at the 2013 federal election.

Thomson was convicted and sentenced in the Melbourne Magistrates Court on 25 March 2014 of 65 charges of fraud and theft for using Health Services Union funds for personal benefit; and sentenced to twelve months imprisonment, with nine months suspended over two years. Thomson was initially released on bail. On 15 December 2014 Thomson was found guilty in the County Court of Victoria of thirteen charges of theft, and was later fined A$25,000. Other charges of obtaining financial advantage by deception were dismissed on appeal.

On 17 October 2018, Thomson was struck off as a lawyer.

On 17 November 2021, Thomson was arrested and charged over allegations he facilitated more than 130 fraudulent visa applications over four years, resulting in more than $2 million of financial gains.

On 22 March 2022, Thomson was arrested at Wamberal for allegedly breaching an apprehended violence order (AVO), hours after he had already pleaded guilty to several domestic violence-related charges involving his ex-wife at the Gosford Local Court. Mr Thomson is alleged to have sent two threatening emails to his estranged wife.

On 23 March 2022, Thomson again appeared before the Court to face 4 new fraud charges in relation to his alleged use of falsified documents to apply for COVID-19 support payments.

== Early life and education ==
Thomson was born in Wellington, New Zealand, and raised in Bathurst, New South Wales. He was educated at the University of New South Wales, where he obtained a Bachelor of Commerce degree. He later completed a law degree at the University of Technology Sydney.

== Union career ==
Thomson started his career representing hospital and ambulance workers in New South Wales as an industrial officer for the Health and Research Employee Association (HREA). He became head of the HREA Industrial Department. He was subsequently elected to the position of Assistant Secretary. In 2002, Thomson was elected as the national secretary of the Health Services Union (HSU), a trade union with which the HREA had merged. During his term at the union it was rebranded as a united federal union and the state branches adopted similar names and logos.

=== Use of credit cards ===
Succeeding Thomson as general secretary of the HSU in January 2008, Kathy Jackson identified financial irregularities in the union's accounts and engaged external auditors to investigate. Reporting in May, the audit raised "concerns about evidence of misuse of union funds by Mr Thomson." In December, the union engaged tax specialists BDO Kendall to "conduct an investigation" over the alleged improper use of Thomson's union-issued corporate credit card. The Sydney Morning Herald revealed the allegations in April 2009; Thomson denied all wrongdoing and stated that an independent audit had not identified any inappropriate use of the card, noted that other people would have been able to incur charges on the account, and said the accusations had been fabricated by rivals within the HSU.

Fair Work Australia, the federal workplace relations tribunal, conducted a three-year investigation into improprieties in the use of union funds which was tabled in the Senate on 7 May 2012. The Australian Federal Police (AFP) commenced investigations, but Thomson said he was not one of the five people of interest. On 15 October 2012 Fair Work Australia launched civil proceedings against Thomson related to his use of HSU funds. Thomson stated that he would contest these charges.

On 24 October 2012 members of the NSW Police conducted a search of Thomson's residence and electorate office on the Central Coast. Eight officers loaded vehicles with computers and five large boxes of evidence. Thomson said the search was "routine" and "They took a couple of documents, I volunteered a couple of documents." Thomson was arrested at his Central Coast electorate office on 31 January 2013. He faced 173 fraud and theft charges relating to his time at the Health Services Union. NSW Police carried out the arrest warrant on the request of the Victoria Police. Thomson was granted bail and was required to appear before the Melbourne Magistrates Court in early February. Thomson denied the allegations, and said that he would be "vigorously defending these charges."

On 18 February 2014, Thomson was found guilty of defrauding the HSU. Thomson returned to court for a plea hearing on his sentence on 18 March. He also faced civil proceedings to repay $28,000 stolen from the HSU; and the Fair Work Commissioner considered commencing civil proceedings on matters where the magistrate dismissed the criminal charges.

On 25 March 2014, Thomson was sentenced to 12 months' imprisonment with nine months suspended for two years. Magistrate Charlie Rozencwajg said Thomson had shown "arrogance in the extreme", a "breach of trust of the highest order" in misusing members' funds and said Thomson had shown no remorse. The magistrate also said "Nothing has been put before me to suggest that these offences were committed for anything other than greed". Thomson was granted bail to appear in the Victorian County Court on 24 November to appeal both his conviction and sentence. On 15 December 2014, Thomson was found not guilty of 49 charges of obtaining financial advantage by deception because of a prosecution error. Thomson was proven guilty of thirteen charges of theft, convicted, and fined A$25,000. In the plea hearing, and handing down the fine and conviction Judge Douglas said that: "Whether it's sex workers or a bottle of wine, it seems to me both of those are self-indulgent," and "It's none of my business that he used a sex worker but it's my business that he used other people's money."

== Political career ==
In November 2007, Thomson stood as the Labor candidate for the seat of Dobell on the Central Coast. He was elected, winning the seat from the incumbent, Ken Ticehurst of the Liberal Party.

Until August 2011, Thomson was the Chair of the House of Representatives Standing Committee on Economics as well as a member of the Privileges Committee and the Petitions Committee. As chair of the economics committee Thomson oversaw inquiries into bank competition and a second report into productivity in Australia.

In December 2011, The Sydney Morning Herald alleged that Thomson had plagiarised internet sources, including Wikipedia, when tabling a report to parliament after an overseas trip. The report in question was unsigned and undated in its cover letter.

=== Impact of the Health Services Union expenses affair ===
While serving as Member for Dobell, he was investigated by Fair Work Australia for nearly four years over allegations that he used his Health Services Union credit card for improper purposes, commonly referred to as the Health Services Union expenses affair. In April 2012, Thomson asked to be suspended from the Labor Party after a discussion with the then Prime Minister, Julia Gillard, and announced his intention to sit on the crossbench as an independent member of parliament. In a statement to the House on 21 May 2012, Thomson professed his innocence and used parliamentary privilege to name a number of individuals and claim that he was set up.

He contested his seat at the 2013 election as an independent candidate, however lost to the Liberals' Karen McNamara.

Following criminal proceedings where Thomson was found guilty of theft and fraud charges, the Federal Parliament voted in favour of a motion of "regret" and apologised to the individuals named in Thomson's statement to the House on 21 May 2012. The matter was also referred to Parliament's Privileges Committee to investigate whether Thomson had deliberately misled the House.

On 4 April 2014 the New South Wales branch of the Labor Party expelled Thomson as a member of the party.

On 11 October 2016, Thomson applied to the Law Society of New South Wales for a practising certificate. The Law Society refused to grant a practising certificate on the basis of his criminal convictions and informed the Prothonotary of the Supreme Court of NSW of that refusal. That led to an application by the Prothonotary to the Supreme Court for declarations that Thomson was not a fit and proper person to remain on the NSW roll of lawyers, and that his name should be removed from the roll. The declarations sought were made by the Court on 17 October 2018.

On 17 November 2021, Thomson was alleged to have "facilitated more than 130 fraudulent visa applications over four years, resulting in more than $2 million of financial gains". The Australian Federal Police have charged Thomson with "multiple offences, including 19 counts of providing false documents and false or misleading information, five counts of a prohibition on asking for or receiving a benefit in return for the occurrence of a sponsorship-related event, two counts of obtaining a financial advantage by deception and one count of dealing with proceeds of crime". The AFP's commander of investigations for Eastern Command, Craig Bellis, said “The alleged offences in this matter involved the exploitation of federal government programs designed to assist Australian businesses, and it is incumbent on the AFP to investigate and prosecute instances of large-scale fraud against Australian taxpayers”. Thomson has been taken into custody and bail refused at Gosford Police Station.

== Personal life ==
Thomson has been married three times, first to Lynette Sharma, second to Christa, and then, on 21 January 2011, to Zoe Arnold, a radio newsreader and media advisor. The couple have three daughters, born in 2009 and 2011.

As of March 2022, Thomson is estranged from his wife and is subject to an AVO against him.

In December 2025, Thomson was sentenced to four years in prison for perpetrating a visa fraud scheme and fraudulently claiming JobKeeper on behalf of a Wyong café without their consent.

== See also ==
- List of Australian fraudsters

Parliament of Australia
Preceded by Ken Ticehurst	Member for Dobell; 2007–2013	Succeeded by Karen McNamara
