= Division of Dobell =

Australian federal electoral division

Coordinates: 33.248°S 151.366°E

Dobell Australian House of Representatives Division
- Interactive map of electorate boundaries from the 2025 federal election
- Created: 1984
- MP: Emma McBride
- Party: Labor
- Namesake: Sir William Dobell
- Electors: 122,630 (2025)
- Area: 675 km^{2} (260.6 sq mi)
- Demographic: Provincial

The Division of Dobell (/doʊbɛl/) is an Australian electoral division in the state of New South Wales.

The current MP is Emma McBride, a member of the Australian Labor Party. She has served since 2016.

== History ==
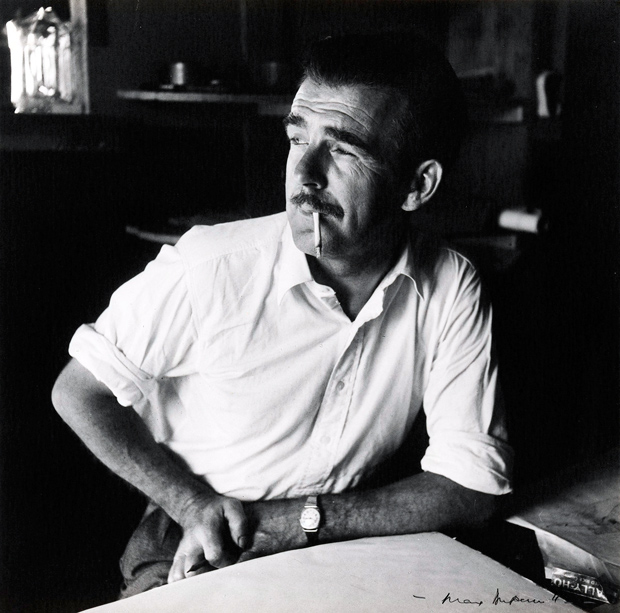
Sir William Dobell, the division's namesake

The Division of Dobell was created in 1984 and is named in honour of Sir William Dobell, the painter. Dobell was originally a fairly safe seat for the Australian Labor Party, held by Michael Lee, a former minister in the Keating government. The seat was won by the Liberal Party in the 2001 election. The Liberals consolidated their hold on the seat at the 2004 election; however Labor regained the seat at the 2007 election when Craig Thomson defeated Ken Ticehurst.

The seat has been held by Labor's Emma McBride since 2016.

== Boundaries ==
Since 1984, federal electoral division boundaries in Australia have been determined at redistributions by a redistribution committee appointed by the Australian Electoral Commission. Redistributions occur for the boundaries of divisions in a particular state, and they occur every seven years, or sooner if a state's representation entitlement changes or when divisions of a state are malapportioned.

The division is located in the Central Coast region and includes the suburbs of The Entrance, Tuggerah and Wyong. The electorate stretches from Blue Haven in the north to Wyoming in the south, from The Entrance in the East through the Jilliby Valley. The division includes the suburbs Bateau Bay, Berkeley Vale, Blue Haven, The Entrance, Gorokan, Jilliby, Lisarow, Ourimbah, Toukley, Tuggerah, Tumbi Umbi, Wamberal, Wyoming, and Wyong.

Since the division was created in 1984, it covered areas previously part of the divisions of Robertson, Shortland and Hunter.

== Members ==
Image	Member	Party	Term	Notes
	Michael Lee (1957–)	Labor	1 December 1984 – 10 November 2001	Served as minister under Keating. Lost seat
	Ken Ticehurst (1945–)	Liberal	10 November 2001 – 24 November 2007	Lost seat
	Craig Thomson (1964–)	Labor	24 November 2007 – 29 April 2012	Lost seat
	Craig Thomson (1964–)	Independent	29 April 2012 – 7 September 2013	Lost seat
	Karen McNamara (1964–)	Liberal	7 September 2013 – 2 July 2016	Lost seat
	Emma McBride (1975–)	Labor	2 July 2016 – present	Incumbent

== Election results ==
2025 Australian federal election: Dobell
Party	Candidate	Votes	%	±%
Labor	Emma McBride	44,268	42.80	−0.09
Liberal	Brendan Small	28,757	27.80	−5.88
Greens	Simon Cooper	10,647	10.29	+1.73
One Nation	Martin Stevenson	9,040	8.74	+1.29
Legalise Cannabis	Tim Claydon	4,895	4.73	+4.73
Trumpet of Patriots	Anthony Tawaf	2,855	2.76	+2.76
Animal Justice	Patrick Murphy	1,906	1.84	+1.84
Libertarian	Isaac Chalik	1,059	1.02	−0.49
Total formal votes		103,427	92.26	−3.12
Informal votes		8,680	7.74	+3.12
Turnout		112,107	91.49	+3.12
Two-party-preferred result
Labor	Emma McBride	61,465	59.43	+2.87
Liberal	Brendan Small	41,962	40.57	−2.87
Labor hold		Swing	+2.87	

2022 Australian federal election: Dobell
Party	Candidate	Votes	%	±%
Labor	Emma McBride	43,595	42.86	+1.37
Liberal	Michael Feneley	34,276	33.70	−7.03
Greens	Cath Connor	8,700	8.55	+1.08
One Nation	Martin Stevenson	7,583	7.45	+7.45
United Australia	Dean Mackin	3,818	3.75	−1.58
Fusion	Geoff Barnes	2,202	2.16	+2.16
Liberal Democrats	Eliot Metherell	1,543	1.52	+1.52
Total formal votes		101,717	95.38	+1.35
Informal votes		4,930	4.62	−1.35
Turnout		106,647	90.07	−1.98
Two-party-preferred result
Labor	Emma McBride	57,491	56.52	+5.02
Liberal	Michael Feneley	44,226	43.48	−5.02
Labor hold		Swing	+5.02	

Alluvial diagram for preference flows in the seat of Dobell in the 2022 federal election. indicates at what stage the winning candidate had over 50% of the votes and was declared the winner.
