= Victorian Allied Health Professionals Association =

Trade union in Victoria, Australia

- Predecessor: HSU East
- Founded: June 2012 (current incarnation)
- Headquarters: Ground Floor, L1, 62 Lygon St, Carlton, Victoria 3053
- Location: Australia
- Members: ~7,300
- Key people: Aneta Menkinoska (Secretary); Elizabeth Muir (Assistant Secretary); Marni Jackson (President); Chris Parsons (Vice President)
- Affiliations: ACTU, HSU
- Website: vahpa.asn.au

The Victorian Allied Health Professionals Association (VAHPA) is the trading name for a trade union in the state of Victoria, Australia. VAHPA forms Branch No. 3 of Health Services Union Victoria (HSU Vic).

VAHPA has around 7,300 members covering health professionals working in allied health professions in the public, community and private healthcare sectors. These professions include Medical Imaging Technologists, Occupational Therapists, Physiotherapists, Radiation Therapists and others.

== History ==
VAHPA was originally a state registered trade union in Victoria. The union had a period of slow and steady growth during the early 1980s. Like many of its state-based contemporaries, VAHPA merged with the larger federally registered Hospital Employees' Federation of Australia in 1986. HEF would later become the Health Services Union of Australia (HSUA) and finally the Health Services Union(HSU).

In May 2010, the branch amalgamated with HSU New South Wales and Branch number 1 of the HSU Victorian Division to form HSU East.

Following the HSU expenses scandal involving then senior HSU officials Craig Thomson, Micael Williamson and Kathy Jackson; in June 2012, HSU East was put into administration. Shortly thereafter the entity was dismantled, the component associations reestablished and fresh elections ordered.

Following the elections, the new leadership adopted the designation Victorian Health Professionals Association (VHPA) as an interim measure in keeping with the branch's long-standing association with the Health Professionals award. Finally, in August 2015, the branch changed its name to its current name.

== Governance and structure ==
VAHPA is governed by a Branch Committee of Management (BCOM) which is elected by the union membership. The last round of elections took place in June 2018.

== Affiliations and politics ==
VAHPA is affiliated to the Australian Council of Trade Unions. It is also affiliated to the Health Services Union National Council, where it sends delegates. The branch currently holds 5 votes on National Council. VAHPA is also affiliated to a number of regional Trades and Labour Councils in Victoria; including to the Victorian Trades and Labour Council and Geelong Trades and Labour Council.

Politically, VAHPA is considered to be on the Left of the political spectrum and has regularly made statements in support of refugee rights, LGBTI rights, action on climate change and other social issues. It is not affiliated to the Australian Labor Party.

VAHPA has made a number of political donations. It has donated to the Greens and has also made donations towards the council election campaigns of Yarra City Councillor Steven Jolly and to Sue Bolton of Socialist Alliance as part of her successful run for Moreland City Council. VAHPA was also among the first unions to support the Victorian Socialists, donating $3500 worth of election materials as part of a failed push to get its candidates elected to the Victorian Legislative Council at the 2018 Victorian state election.

VAHPA has been active in campaigning around community health, both for better wages and conditions for community health workers as well as better government funding for community health more generally.
