= Royal Commission into Trade Union Governance and Corruption =

Australian Royal Commission

Alleged financial irregularities associated with the affairs of trade unions
- Inquiries: Royal Commission into Trade Union Governance and Corruption
- Commissioner: Dyson Heydon, AC KC
- Inquiry period: 10 February 2014 – 28 December 2015
- Constituting instrument: Royal Commissions Act 1902 (Cth)
- Website: tradeunionroyalcommission.gov.au

The Royal Commission into Trade Union Governance and Corruption was a Royal Commission established by the Government of Australia to inquire into alleged financial irregularities associated with the affairs of trade unions. The Australian Workers Union, Construction, Forestry, Maritime, Mining and Energy Union, Electrical Trades Union, Health Services Union and the Transport Workers Union were named in the terms of reference. The Royal Commission inquired into the activities relating to slush funds and other similar funds and entities established by, or related to, the affairs of these organisations.

The Prime Minister Tony Abbott announced the Royal Commission on 10 February 2014 and nominated that the Commission be overseen by a sole Royal Commissioner, Dyson Heydon, a former High Court judge. Letters Patent were issued on 13 March 2014. The commissioner submitted an Interim Report in December 2014, which found cases of "wilful defiance of the law" and recommended criminal charges against certain unionists. Allegations of illegality against nine unions had been uncovered, with over 50 potential breaches of criminal and civil law identified.

Following an extension, the Commissioner presented his final report to the Governor-General in December 2015, finding "widespread and deep-seated" misconduct by union officials in Australia. More than 40 people and organisations were referred to authorities, including police, Directors of Public Prosecutions, the Australian Securities & Investments Commission and the Fair Work Commission, and a recommendation for the establishment of an independent body to investigate union records and finances was made.

The only conviction of a union official from the process was a CFMEU staff member, sentenced to a $500 good behaviour bond after he accidentally disposed of documents that could have been requested by the commission. The documents were later found to be irrelevant to the commission. Five union officials had charges dropped or were found not guilty.

The Australian Council of Trade Unions labelled the Royal Commission as a politicised stitch-up intended solely to advance the Union busting ideological & partisan agenda of the Liberal Party of Australia. The Australian Labor Party through their employment spokesman, Brendan O’Connor labelled the Royal Commission as modern-day McCarthyism and an outrageous intrusion into the personal affairs of Union members. Dyson Heydon, an avowed conservative was also revealed to have been directly involved with the Liberal Party and made highly partisan attacks on Labor prior to being appointed as the Commissioner. This led to questions over his impartiality, and a rejected application to recuse himself. Heydon was later found by an independent Commonwealth investigation to have sexually harassed six women. He resigned in disgrace from the Order of Australia, with the Chief Justice of Australia Susan Kiefel apologising to the women on behalf of the High Court of Australia.

== Establishment of the Commission ==
=== Background ===
In 2013 the Fair Work Commission commenced initial inquiries into allegations of improper union financial conduct, and the Opposition Liberal-National Coalition promised a judicial inquiry into the AWU affair, which involved allegations of misappropriation of funds by officials of the Australian Workers' Union. Craig Thomson, a Federal Labor MP, and Michael Williamson, a former President of the Labor Party, were facing fraud allegations in relation to their financial dealings as officials of the Health Services Union (both men were later convicted of fraud).

In December 2013, the Fairfax press reported that the newly elected Abbott government would call a Royal Commission into trade union slush funds, "less than a fortnight after a Fairfax Media investigation uncovered millions of dollars in a string of secret union slush funds. The series of Fairfax reports revealed the involvement of the NSW Right’s powerful Transport Workers Union in a $500,000 takeover of its own Queensland branch with the backing of the disgraced former HSU leader Michael Williamson. It also reported the possible unlawful misuse of union and parliamentary staff by senior union officials and Labor figures."

=== Letters Patent ===
The Royal Commission into Trade Union Governance and Corruption was established on 13 March 2014 by Governor-General, Quentin Bryce. The Governor-General issued Letters Patent which formally appointed the Royal Commissioner, Dyson Heydon, and outlined the Terms of Reference for the inquiry.

The Letters Patent called for an investigation and recommendations with particular regard for the financial management of relevant entities and the adequacy of existing laws relating to the financial management of those entities and the accountability of their officers. It was also to investigate whether relevant entities are used for unlawful purpose; as well as the use of funds solicited in the name relevant entities. The Australian Workers' Union; Construction, Forestry, Maritime, Mining and Energy Union; Communications, Electrical, Electronic, Energy, Information, Postal, Plumbing and Allied Services Union of Australia; the Health Services Union; and the Transport Workers Union were nominated for investigation, but the Letters Patent permitted other entities facing "credible allegations" to be investigated.

On 30 October 2014, Governor-General Peter Cosgrove amended the Letters Patent to include an additional term of reference, and the reporting date was revised from 31 December 2014 to 31 December 2015. Dyson Heydon told the Royal Commission in April, 2015, that "A reading of the Interim Report will reveal that the progress of the Commission's investigations in 2014 was impeded by false testimony, delays in document production, document destruction or removal and reluctance to cooperate even on the part of persons hostile to alleged misconduct" and said that some witnesses feared for their safety.

=== Commissioner Heydon ===
Justice Dyson Heydon AC, QC served as a judge of the New South Wales Court of Appeal from 2000, and was appointed as a judge of the High Court of Australia in February 2003. He was appointed a Companion in the General Division of the Order of Australia in 2004. Justice Heydon is a former Rhodes Scholar, and holds a Master of Arts and Bachelor of Civil Law from Oxford University. He was admitted to the New South Wales Bar in 1973 and appointed Queen's Counsel in 1987. Aged 34, he was elected dean of the Sydney Law School and practised at the Bar from 1979 until his appointment to the Court of Appeal. Heydon has written a number of legal texts, including Cross on Evidence and The Restraint of Trade Doctrine (1971).

==== Bill Shorten appearance ====
In July 2015, Opposition Leader Bill Shorten of the Australian Labor Party, a former official of the AWU, was called to give evidence at the Royal Commission. Over two days of questioning, Counsel Assisting asked Shorten several times if he had had a conflict of interest in accepting, and not disclosing, large donations from employers while negotiating for the union on behalf of employees. Shorten said there was no conflict of interest. Shorten admitted to the commission that he had failed to declare a political donation of around $40,000 from a labour hire company in the lead up to the 2007 election campaign, and that invoices regarding the payments for services were not truthful. Shorten denied knowledge of alleged false invoicing, totalling more than $300,000, which had been sent to construction companies Thiess and John Holland.

During cross examination, Counsel Assisting said that Shorten was being "evasive". Heydon intervened to tell Shorten that some of his answers were "non-responsive", adding "If I can be frank about it, you have been criticised in the newspapers in the last few weeks and I think it’s generally believed that you have come here in the hope you will be able to rebut that criticism or a lot of it. I’m not very troubled about that, though I can understand that you are, and it’s legitimate for you to use this occasion to achieve your ends in that regard. What I’m concerned about more is your credibility as a witness … and perhaps your self-interest as a witness as well. It is in your interest to curb these, to some extent, extraneous answers." Following the hearing, Labor frontbencher Brendan O'Connor, brother of CFMEU national secretary Michael O'Connor, criticised Heydon's comments as "a remarkable interjection" and called the commission "a witch hunt."

==== Recusal application ====
During his term as Royal Commissioner, Heydon was invited to deliver the 6th Sir Garfield Barwick Address, a fundraising event organised by a Lawyers Branch and the Legal Policy Branch of the Liberal Party, on the assumption that the commission would have completed its inquiries. Heydon confirmed his availability to give the address. The Abbott government extended the term of the Royal Commission in October 2014, and when Heydon was reminded of the address in March 2015, he confirmed his ongoing interest.

Heydon later declared that he had "overlooked" the fact that the event was organised by the Liberal Party, and that he had been asked to give the address only if the Royal Commission had finished. Heydon said "I overlooked the connection between the person or persons organising the event and the Liberal Party which had been stated in the email of 10 April of 2014," and said "I also overlooked the fact my agreement to speak at that time had been conditional on the work of the commission being completed before that time."

On 14 April 2015, the NSW Bar Association announced that Heydon would deliver the 6th Annual Sir Garfield Barwick Address. Heydon was sent information about the event on 12 June 2015, with attachments declaring the event a Liberal Party fundraiser. Heydon stated that he did not read the attachments. It was later agreed that the Liberal Party would not be mentioned on advertisements in public Bar Association publications. On 13 August, journalists obtained flyers for the event, announcing that it was a Liberal Party fundraiser.

Heydon's assistant confirmed on 13 August at 9:23 am that Heydon would attend, saying "He does not wish to answer any questions after his address. If there is any possibility that the event could be described as a Liberal Party event he will be unable to give the address, at least whilst he is in the position of the Royal Commissioner." Fairfax Media reported that they contacted the commissioner's office at 9:35 am. A spokesman for Heydon said that he made a decision not to attend the fundraiser, but this was before being contacted by the media about the Liberal Party flyers. Heydon adjourned the royal commission when the invitation came to public light, saying "Another problem has arisen that I need to attend to."

There were calls later that day from Labor parliamentarians for Heydon to withdraw from the Royal Commissioner role on the ground of an appearance of bias, reiterating earlier allegations of the political intent of the commission, while Prime Minister Tony Abbott defended Heydon's role and the justification for the Royal Commission. Abbott said that "Someone who knows [Heydon] very well and who's no great friend of this government Julian Burnside QC, has said this morning that he's a man of honour". Burnside said: "Heydon is an honourable man. I give him the benefit of the doubt. Maybe he is honourable enough to step down."

On 17 August 2015, the Sydney Morning Herald reported that Heydon was on the panel that awarded Tony Abbott his Rhodes scholarship. On 19 August, it was reported that Heydon had said in a June 2013 panel discussion at the Centre for Independent Studies that Kevin Rudd's government had a tendency to "do non-substantive things". Former Labor Minister Graham Richardson wrote in The Australian that the comments were "partisan". In a press release, the Law Council criticised public attacks on Heydon, stating: "The public attacks on the commissioner being played out through the media are unacceptable and damage the basis on which tribunals and courts operate... In this case, Mr John Dyson Heydon AC QC is a highly regarded former judicial officer."

On 21 August, the ACTU, AWU and CFMEU all made applications in the Commission for Heydon to step down on the ground of "apprehended bias".

On 31 August, Heydon dismissed the applications for him to stand down, publishing his reasons on the royal commission's website. In a 209-paragraph ruling, Heydon rejected all of the contentions in detail. As to the suggestion that anything in his acceptance of the invitation to deliver the Sir Garfield Barwick Lecture gave rise to a reasonable apprehension of bias, he said (para. 87): "The mere fact that a person agrees to deliver a speech at a particular forum does not rationally establish that the person is sympathetic to, or endorses the views of, the organiser of that forum."

=== Counsel assisting ===
Senior counsel assisting the commission are: Jeremy Stoljar SC, whose areas of practice include commercial law, corporations law (including corporate governance), property and building and construction; Sarah McNaughton SC, whose areas of practice include criminal law (including complex tax fraud and corporate fraud), disciplinary proceedings and inquests.

Other counsel assisting the commission are: Richard Scruby, who practices in a variety of jurisdictions, with the main areas of practice including equity and commercial law, corporations law, mining law and building and construction; Michael Elliott, whose practice areas include commercial, corporate officers' duties and liabilities, building and construction, insurance and professional negligence and has appeared as counsel at various commissions; and Thomas Prince, who was admitted to the New South Wales Bar in 2012.

=== Powers ===
The powers of Royal Commissions in Australia are set out in the enabling legislation, the Royal Commissions Act 1902 (Cth). Royal Commissions, appointed pursuant to the Royal Commissions Act or otherwise, have powers to issue a summons to a person to appear before the Commission at a hearing to give evidence or to produce documents specified in the summons; require witnesses to take an oath or give an affirmation; and require a person to deliver documents to the Commission at a specified place and time. A person served with a summons or a notice to produce documents must comply with that requirement, or face prosecution for an offence. The penalty for conviction upon such an offence is a fine of $1,000 or six months imprisonment. A Royal Commission may authorise the Australian Federal Police to execute search warrants.

== Procedures and methods ==
=== Hearings ===
Commissioner Heydon heard opening statements at the Royal Commission on 7 July 2014. By year's end, the Trade Union Royal Commission held more than 70 public and private hearings, which involved 239 witnesses. The hearings were conducted in Sydney, Melbourne, Perth and Brisbane. 687 Notices to Produce and releasing Issues Papers on governance and protections were issued. The Royal Commission continues its Public Hearings in 2015.

== Reports ==
Interim Report

Commissioner Heydon handed his Interim Report to Governor General Peter Cosgrove on 15 December, and it was tabled in Parliament on 19 December 2014. Commissioner Heydon's 1817 page Report found that the Construction Union acts in "wilful defiance of the law", and he recommended criminal charges of blackmail be considered against John Setka, the state secretary of the Construction, Forestry, Mining and Energy Union (CFMEU), along with his assistant Shaun Reardon and a number of other senior CFMEU officials. Activities cited by CFMEU officials included death threats, extortion, gross neglect, and other "serious criminal matters".

Upon release of the Interim Report, The Age reported that: "Justice Heydon identified key concerns about the use and operation of union election slush funds. They include that they operate largely in secret, have deficient or non-existent record-keeping and that candidates commonly plead ignorance on how money is raised and spent. The report also recommended fraud charges be considered against former Australian Workers' Union officials Bruce Wilson and Ralph Blewitt for their use of a secret slush fund in the 1990s. Mr Wilson was the ex-boyfriend of former prime minister Julia Gillard. Justice Heydon said there were no grounds for prosecuting Ms Gillard, but agreed with counsel assisting Jeremy Stoljar's submission, that her conduct as a solicitor had been "questionable". Ms Gillard had done legal work setting up the slush fund for Mr Wilson and Mr Blewitt. The report recommended seven past and present Health Services Union officials should be considered for charges for their role in an alleged right of entry scam... .

== Results of hearings and recommendations ==
In August 2015, The Australian reported that 30 individuals had been referred to 11 agencies for possible charges, and that 11 people had been referred to Commonwealth Director of Public Prosecutions (DPP) and ten people to state DPPs. Four arrests had already been made by police, and allegations of illegality against nine unions had been uncovered, with over 50 potential breaches of criminal and civil law identified.

Following July/August 2015 hearings in Canberra, it was reported that the Australian Competition & Consumer Commission (ACCC) began investigating allegations emerging from the Royal Commission that union actions resulted in price fixing in the concrete and formwork trades. The media reported that "Allegations of intimidation, blackmail, standover tactics and threats" were uncovered and two arrests of union officials for alleged blackmail offences were made following their testimony.

As of March 2016, only one conviction has been attained, while five other union officials have either had their charges dropped, or were found not guilty. The sole conviction was a staff member of a state union who had disposed of documents during an office clean-up that "could" at some point been requested by the commission. The staffer was given a short suspended jail sentence and a $500 good behaviour bond with the judge finding that none of the documents were relevant to the Royal Commission or involved any corrupt acts.

=== Final Report ===
Commissioner Heydon found that corruption was widespread and deep-seated, and recommended a new national regulator with the same powers as the Australian Securities and Investments Commission be established to combat corruption in the trade union movement. The Report highlighted insufficient record keeping (including false invoicing and destruction of documents); "rubber stamp" committees which failed to enforce rules; payment of large sums by employers to unions; and influence peddling by means of the inflation of union membership figures. The Report recommended a toughening of financial disclosure rules, new civil penalties to bind workers and officials on financial disclosure provisions; a new criminal offence. Frank Bongiorno, Professor of History at the Australian National University, has described this report as having "all the impact of last year’s telephone book being dumped in a wheelie-bin."

== Government Commissions ==
=== Establishment ===
In 2017 the Turnbull government established both the Australian Building and Construction Commission to "ensure that building work is carried out fairly, efficiently and productively", and the Registered Organisations Commission to "increase financial transparency and accountability in registered organisation". The bills establishing the statutory authorities were amongst those cited by Malcolm Turnbull when he called a double dissolution election in 2016. The trigger bills were reintroduced to parliament after the election and all were passed with amendments.

=== Abolition & amendments ===
In December 2022 the Albanese government passed legislation abolishing the Australian Building and Construction Commission and the Registered Organisations Commission on 6 February 2023, transferring all of its regulatory authority functions to the General Manager of the Fair Work Commission by the 6th of June 2023. In addition to these abolitions, the legislation amended the Fair Work Act 2009 and other workplace relations laws relating to bargaining, job security, gender equality, compliance and enforcement, workplace conditions and protections.
