= South Australia v Totani =

- Court: High Court of Australia
- Decided: 11 November 2010
- Citations: [2010] HCA 39, (2010) 242 CLR 1

Case history
- Prior actions: Totani v South Australia [2009] SASC 301, (2009) 105 SASR 244

Case opinions
- Majority: French CJ, Gummow, Hayne, Crennan, Kiefel and Bell JJ (6:1) s 14(1) of the Serious and Organised Crime (Control) Act 2008 (SA) and a control order made under it was constitutionally invalid.
- Dissent: Heydon J

South Australia v Totani is a landmark Australian judgment of the High Court concerning the extent to which the legislative power of an Australian State is limited by the separation of powers in the Commonwealth Constitution. The High Court held that the legislative power of a State does not extend to enacting a law which deprives a court of the State of one of its defining characteristics as a court or impairs one or more of those characteristics.

== Background ==
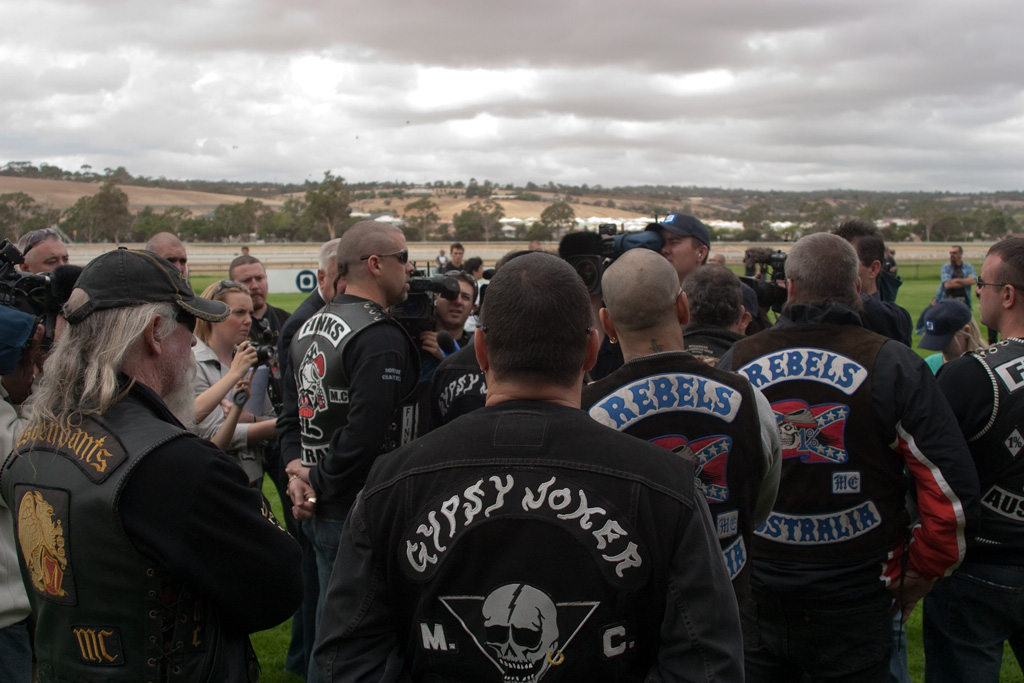
Members from several clubs meet at a run in South Australia, 2009 to protest the laws.

In 2008 there was a move for controlling the activities of Outlaw Motorcycle clubs by numerous Australian State Governments that culminated in the South Australian Parliament introducing the Serious and Organised Crime (Control) Act 2008. The effect of this legislation was to allow… the making of declarations and orders for the purpose of disrupting and restricting the activities of criminal organisations, their members and associates. The essence of the scheme was that the Attorney-General could make a declaration, to the effect that the members of an organisation were involved in serious criminal activity and that there was a risk to public safety and order. If The Commissioner of Police could then apply to the Magistrates Court for a control order against any member of a declared organisation. There was no requirement that the person be notified of the application, nor that that person had committed or was ever likely to commit a criminal offence.

The court did not have any discretion whether a control order should be made, with the section 14(1) providing:

The Court must, on application by the Commissioner, make a control order against a person (the defendant) if the Court is satisfied that the defendant is a member of a declared organisation.

On 14 May 2009 the Attorney-General considered that the members of the Finks Motorcycle Club were involved in serious criminal activity and made a declaration in relation to the club under section 10 of the Act.

The Commissioner of Police applied for a control order against a member of the Finks Motorcycle Club, Donald Hudson, who was not notified of the application and the Magistrates Court made the control order. The Commissioner of Police applied for a control order against another member, Sandro Totani. Both men made an application to the Supreme Court of South Australia, claiming that parts of the Serious and Organised Crime (Control) Act were invalid, and that the declaration made by the Attorney-General was also invalid. The Full Court of the Supreme Court held by a 2:1 majority that section 14(1) of the Act was invalid, but that section 10 which authorised the declaration by the Attorney-General, by itself, was a valid exercise of the legislative power of the State. Bleby J relied upon the decisions of the High Court in Kable v Director of Public Prosecutions (NSW) and Thomas v Mowbray. This included references to the judgement of Gummow and Crennan JJ where their Honours said at [111]:

As a general proposition, it may be accepted that legislation which requires a court exercising federal jurisdiction to depart to a significant degree from the methods and standards which have characterised judicial activities in the past may be repugnant to Ch III.

Bleby J also cited the dissent of Kirby J in Thomas v Mowbray where his Honour said at [366]:

Requiring such courts, as of ordinary course, to issue orders ex parte, that deprive an individual of basic civil rights, on the application of officers of the Executive Branch of Government and upon proof to the civil standard alone that the measures are reasonably necessary to protect the public from a future terrorist act, departs from the manner in which, for more than a century, the judicial power of the Commonwealth has been exercised under the Constitution.

The State of South Australia then appealed that decision to the High Court of Australia.

== Decision ==
This appeal was dismissed by the High Court 6:1 with only Heydon J dissenting.

A majority of the Court considered that s 14(1) of the Act obliged the Magistrates Court to impose serious restraints on a person's liberty whether or not that person had committed or was ever likely to commit a criminal offence. The provision authorised the executive to enlist the Magistrates Court in implementing decisions of the executive and that the manner in which that occurred was incompatible with the Magistrates Court's institutional integrity as an independent and impartial tribunal. French CJ held at [26] that the legislative power of a State does not extend to enacting a law which deprives a court of the State of one of its defining characteristics as a court or impairs one or more of those characteristics. The courts decision was based in part on their concern that the Act infringed common law freedoms for the individuals involved, but mostly on the prospect of a Parliament directing courts was inconsistent with the separation of powers under the Commonwealth Constitution which applied to the state Magistrates Court as a repository of federal judicial power under section 71 of the Constitution.
