= Lex Lasry =

Australian judge (born 1948)

The Honourable Justice Lex Lasry AM, KC

Justice of the Supreme Court of Victoria
- In office 23 October 2007 – June 2018
- Nominated by: John Brumby
- Appointed by: David de Kretser
- Succeeded by: Lesley Taylor

Personal details
- Born: 8 July 1948 (age 78) Melbourne, Victoria, Australia
- Children: 4
- Education: Monash University
- Occupation: Jurist; Barrister; Solicitor

Lex Lasry AM (born 8 July 1948) is an Australian lawyer and a retired judge of the Supreme Court of Victoria from 2007 to 2018. He also sat as a reserve judge from 2018 until his retirement as a reserve judge in February 2024. On 1 January 2025 he was appointed as an Acting Judge of the Supreme Court of the Northern Territory.

== Early life and education ==
Lasry grew up in the Victorian country town of Healesville where his father worked as a solicitor. He attended Healesville Primary School, Haileybury College and Monash University, where he graduated with a Bachelor of Jurisprudence in 1970, and a Bachelor of Laws in 1972.

== Career ==
=== Barrister and advocate ===
Lasry completed his 'articles' at the law firm Slater & Gordon, and read for the Victorian Bar under David Bennett QC. He was admitted to practise law in Victoria in 1973 and was appointed Queen's Counsel in 1990. Lasry has acted as a junior counsel before the Costigan royal commission, counsel with the National Crime Authority, and was the Royal Commissioner for the Inquiry into the Victorian Metropolitan Ambulance Service. From 2003 and 2006, Lasry acted as senior counsel assisting the Coronial inquiry into the 2003 Canberra bushfires. Prior to his 2007 appointment to the bench, Lasry was entitled to practise law in the Australian jurisdictions of Victoria, New South Wales, the Northern Territory, Queensland, South Australia, and Western Australia.

As the former chair of the Victorian Criminal Bar Association, in August 2004, Lasry was appointed as the independent observer representing the Law Council of Australia at the trial of Australian Guantanamo Bay detainee David Hicks. He attended Military Commission hearings at Guantanamo Bay in August 2004 and March 2007.

As a barrister and Queens Counsel, Lasry has acted as defence counsel in several high-profile criminal cases in Australia and overseas. He acted on behalf of Joseph Thomas in a high-profile Australian terror trial (see R v Thomas) in which Thomas was convicted of receiving funds from a terrorist organisation and for passport offences. The conviction was overturned on appeal. Lasry represented Van Tuong Nguyen in the high-profile case in which he was convicted of drug trafficking in Singapore in 2002 and executed in December 2005. At about that time Lasry took up the case of Andrew Chan and Myuran Sukumaran, two of the nine Australians convicted of drug trafficking in Indonesia, known as the Bali Nine. That work has been continued by barrister Julian McMahon and a team of Victorian lawyers.

=== Appointment to the bench ===
Lasry was appointed as a justice of the Supreme Court of Victoria on 23 October 2007. He is also a member of the Council of the International Criminal Bar for counsel practising before the International Court of Justice. He also chaired appellate hearings for the Confederation of Australian Motor Sport (CAMS) and for V8 Supercar racing, and has a motor racing licence.

On 8 December 2011, he sentenced Matthew Charles Johnson to a non parole period of 32 years in jail over the murder of ‘Melbourne Gangland’ killer Carl Williams.

On 18 March 2016, he sentenced Sean Price to life (38 years non parole) over the stabbing murder of 17 year old school girl Masa Vukotic.

He retired in June 2018 but continued hearing cases as a reserve judge until February 2024.

In February 2024, Lasry quit the judiciary in response to a complaint lodged by the Victorian Director of Public Prosecutions (DPP). Lasry rejected the complaint, but stated he could no longer preside over cases involving the DPP and he would therefore resign.

On 1 January 2025, Lasry was appointed as an Acting Judge of the Supreme Court of the Northern Territory

== Awards and honours ==
In 2007 Lasry was awarded the Law Council of Australia's inaugural Presidents Medal for his pro bono representation of Van Nguyen in 2005, and for his outstanding work as Independent Legal Observer for Hicks in 2004 and 2005.

== Personal life ==
Lasry has been a longstanding opponent of the use of the death penalty, arguing "when the state kills a citizen, no matter what they have done, the community is diminished by the killing." In reference to the Bali Nine, Lasry stated "The idea that the government would take individuals out into the bush and shoot them is something I can never live with... and from a legal viewpoint, it has no deterrent value." In 2015, Lasry organised a concert in support of jailed Australian journalist Peter Greste.

He is a longtime supporter of the St Kilda Football Club and, in 2011, was appointed to serve a three-year term on the Faculty Board of the Faculty of Law at Monash University.

He plays in his own rock band, The Lex Pistols, and he has raced Porsche cars for many years.
