= Health Services Union expenses affair =

Political scandal in Australia

- Participants: Craig Thomson; Michael Williamson; Kathy Jackson; Health Services Union
- Inquiries: Fair Work Australia inquiry; Temby Report; Royal Commission into Trade Union Governance and Corruption
- Charges: Theft; Fraud; Fabricating invoices; Hindering police
- Verdict: Guilty on appeal; Guilty plea
- Convictions: A$25,000 on appeal (17 December 2014); 7½ years' custody, with a non–parole period of 5 years (28 March 2014)

The Health Services Union expenses affair was an Australian political scandal that concerned criminal activities associated with the financial affairs of the Health Services Union of Australia (HSU), between 2006 and 2007; and the Health Services Union "east branch" (HSUeast) between 2006 and 2011.

Following regulatory and administrative investigations, criminal trials and a subsequent appeal, on 15 December 2014 Craig Thomson, a former national secretary of the HSU and a former Labor politician, was found guilty in the Victorian County Court of thirteen charges of theft, and later convicted and fined A$25,000. Earlier convictions for obtaining financial advantage by deception were overturned on appeal.

His conviction followed an appeal against a conviction and sentence in the Melbourne Magistrates Court on 25 March 2014 when Thomson was found guilty of 65 charges of fraud and theft for using Health Services Union funds for personal benefit; and sentenced to twelve months imprisonment, with nine months suspended over two years. Thomson was initially released on bail; and the conviction and sentence subsequently overturned on appeal.

In October 2013, Michael Williamson, a former national president of the HSU, a former general secretary of HSUeast, and a former union and Labor right-wing factional power broker, pleaded guilty to two charges of fraud totaling nearly A$1 million from HSUeast, one charge of fabricating invoices and another charge of recruiting others to hinder a police investigation. An earlier independent report commissioned by the union detailed that companies associated with Williamson and his family had allegedly fraudulently received more than $5 million from HSUeast in the period from 2006 to 2011. In the NSW District Court in March 2014, Williamson was sentenced to seven–and–a–half years of imprisonment; with a non–parole period of five years.

As of 28 March 2014 civil proceedings against Thomson and Williamson were pending.

== Background ==
The Health Services Union (HSU) was officially formed in 1991 by the amalgamation of the Hospital Employees' Federation (HEF) and the Health and Research Employees Association (HREA). The specialist trade union had around 70,000 members working in all areas of healthcare across Australia as at 2013. The membership of the union includes doctors, nurses and allied health professionals such as physiotherapists and radiographers, ambulance officers, clerical and administrative staff, managers and support staff in the health and aged care sectors. The HSUeast branch, covering New South Wales, Victoria, and the Australian Capital Territory, was controversially formed in 2010, following years of factional fighting between leadership teams from the HSU New South Wales, HSU Victorian No. 1 and No. 3 branches.

Thomson started his career representing hospital and ambulance workers in New South Wales as an industrial officer for the HREA. He became head of the HREA Industrial Department. He was subsequently elected to the position of Assistant Secretary. In 2002, Thomson was elected as the national secretary of the HSU. After a seemingly successful career in the union movement, Thomson was endorsed as Labor's candidate for the federal seat of Dobell on the NSW Central Coast and won the seat at the 2007 federal election. He was re-elected as the Member for Dobell in 2010, representing Labor.

Williamson rose to prominence as an official of the HSU, representing the interests of low-paid workers in the health sector in New South Wales and then Australia. Williamson was general secretary of HSU NSW branch, later to become HSUeast, serving in this role between 1997 until June 2012. He was elected as the inaugural national president of the union in 2003 until October 2011. During his term as national president he controversially merged the NSW and two Victorian branches of the union to create HSUeast. He was elected as the national president of the Australian Labor Party, serving between 2009 and 2010; and was a vice president of NSW Labor. Williamson was also a vice president of Unions NSW until April 2012. He was a member of the national executive of the Australian Council of Trade Unions (ACTU); a trustee of First State Super; and a non-executive director of SGE Credit Union, a credit union for NSW Government employees.

Following Thomson's move into politics, his successor as national secretary was Kathy Jackson, a protege of Williamson. Jackson rose through the ranks of the HSUeast branch and its predecessors in Victoria, and was aligned with Labor's moderate Unity faction. Jackson's former husband, Jeff Jackson, was general secretary of the Victorian branch of the HSU, that had been placed into administration in 2009 by the Federal Court after tensions between factional parties could not be resolved.

== Allegations of impropriety ==
In January 2008, members of the National Executive identified financial irregularities in Thomson's union credit card statement. Further investigation showed that members' money was being spent on prostitution services. The National Executive directed the then National Secretary Katherine Jackson (née Koukouvaos) to engage forensic auditors to investigate the matter further. Jackson long resisted these calls, however, after some months she eventually recognised that it was impossible to continue in this way. She finally took steps to engage external auditors to investigate further. Reporting in May, the audit raised "concerns about evidence of misuse of union funds by Mr Thomson." In December, the union engaged tax specialists BDO Kendall to "conduct an investigation" over the alleged improper use of Thomson's union-issued corporate credit card. The Sydney Morning Herald revealed the allegations in April 2009; Thomson denied all wrongdoing and stated that an independent audit had not identified any inappropriate use of the card, noted that other people would have been able to incur charges on the account, and said the accusations had been fabricated by rivals within the HSU.

In 2007 Craig Thomson left the national office. The financial reports had not been put in. I then attempted to put those reports in, but not under my signature because I could not sign off on them because we'd found allegations of corruption in our union. So therefore, I wrote to Fair Work Australia seeking their advice about how to handle this issue and I followed their advice. I followed other professionals' advice, including the auditors and the union solicitors. And for them to come out now and to say that I didn't put the report in in time when I actually followed their process is totally outrageous and scandalous on their part.

— Kathy Jackson, as general secretary of the Health Services Union of Australia, 7 May 2012

=== Inquiries by Australian government agencies ===
Fair Work Australia, the federal workplace relations regulator and tribunal, conducted a three-year investigation into improprieties in the use of union funds involving both the Victorian No. 1 Branch, and the national office of the HSU. On 23 December 2011, the appointed investigator, Terry Nassios, produced the Victoria No.1 report, which was publicly released publicly on 16 March 2012. The report, consisting of 183 findings, was tabled in the Senate on 7 May 2012. Within this report, 153 findings pertained to Thomson's breaches of union rules and sections 237(1), 285(1), 286(1), and 287(1) of Schedule 1 of the Workplace Relations Amendment (Registration and Accountability of Organisations) Act 2002 (Cth).

The Fair Work Australia investigations were criticised for failing to investigate the finances of the HSU following a petition in July 2009 by the members of HSU No. 4 Branch. On 15 October 2012 Fair Work Australia launched civil proceedings against Thomson related to his use of HSU funds. Thomson stated that he would contest these charges.

Following the release of the Fair Work Australia report, the Australian Federal Police commenced investigations. Thomson claimed he was not one of the five people of interest.

=== Other investigations ===
In 2011 the Union Council of the HSUeast branch resolved to commence an investigation into the financial affairs of the branch; and sought counsel from the President of the New South Wales Bar Association to select an independent panel of experts to investigate:

- adequacy of governance arrangements and business practices of HSUeast;
- access to financial and business related information for union members to ensure transparency and scrutiny;
- policies and procedures and potential conflicts of interest for office bearers, or staff that hold directorships or shares/ownership in companies that supply goods to HSUeast;
- policies around the use of HSUeast credit cards; and
- other matters the panel deems appropriate.

Following an interim report delivered in April 2012 and a final report delivered in July 2012, Ian Temby AO QC and Dennis Robertson, an accountant, found that $20 million was paid by HSUeast without any form of tendering or contract. This included $5 million paid to companies operated by Williamson and his wife. Prime Minister Julia Gillard commented that "It's clear that there have been real problems at the HSU. That’s distressing I think to everyone who cares about working people."

Meanwhile, NSW Police officers raided the union's Sydney office on 2 May 2012, seizing documents and computers as part of the "Strike Force Carnarvon" investigation into secret commissions allegedly received by Williamson and Thomson. Williamson was intercepted in a basement attempting to remove a bag of documents.

== Credit card misuse by an official of the HSU national office ==
The report by Fair Work Australia (FWA) concluded that Thomson had spent almost $270,000 of union members' funds on his 2007 election federal campaign for Dobell. This included $200,000 for two political staff members who worked on the campaign, and another $71,000 directly expended on the campaign. Other money, including from Thomson's union credit card, was used to pay for office supplies including furniture and utility connections. Following his election in 2007 as the Member for Dobell, Thomson resigned from the HSU on 14 December 2007. On 18 May 2012 it was reported that Terry Nassios, the FWA investigator stated that he was unsure if some payments by Thomson had been made on the card after that date and that he recommended the payments after the resignation date be reported to the public prosecutor for investigation.

During Question Time on 16 August 2011, Prime Minister Gillard was asked if her confidence in Thomson was based on a thorough investigation of his credibility. She replied, "I have complete confidence in the member for Dobell. I look forward to him continuing to do that job for a very long, long, long time to come." Gillard later moved to suspend Thomson from the Labor Party on 29 April 2012, saying "At the moment, Australian voters see a dark cloud over Parliament. I have made a judgment about the Parliament and about respect for the Parliament. There is a line which has been crossed here." She said the decision was solely hers but that Thomson agreed with her. Later he stated that he had had different reasons for leaving the party than those given by the Prime Minister.

In an address to the House on 21 May 2012 Thomson said that there were credit cards which showed expenditure on escorts and prostitutes for at least two other officials. He implied that Jeff Jackson, a former HSU executive member and the former husband of Kathy Jackson, the HSU national secretary, was one of two officials responsible for the spending on prostitutes, a claim earlier made by HSU branch president Pauline Fegan. Thomson's allegations were rejected by the union figures he named as being able to support his claims, including his half-brother, former union official Struan Robertson. Thomson questioned the impartiality of the investigation. Michael Lawler the Vice President of FWA was involved in internal HSU politics at the request of his partner Kathy Jackson. Jackson allegedly supplied most of the documents used by the FWA in its HSU national office investigation.

Nassios, citing a newspaper report, stated $15,000 had been repaid by Jeff Jackson in settlement of three payments of $5,000 identified as "back pay" dishonestly claimed. When asked by Fair Work Australia to clarify if this claim pertained to Jackson, Thomson declined to provide any details, citing legal advice. On 15 October 2012 Fair Work Australia launched civil proceedings against Thomson related to his misuse of HSU funds. Thomson stated that he would contest these charges.

Thomson was later arrested, charged with 140 offences relating to theft and fraud, and trialled by judge in the Melbourne Magistrates Court. On 18 February 2014 he was found guilty of theft from the HSU and of defrauding the HSU. Thomson had misused his union credit card to pay for prostitutes, travel expenses and cigarettes, and for accommodation and dinners even after he'd left the union to run for Parliament.

On 25 March 2014, Thomson was sentenced to 12 months imprisonment with nine months suspended for two years. Magistrate Charlie Rozencwajg said Thomson shown "arrogance in the extreme", a "breach of trust of the highest order" in misusing members' funds and said Thomson had shown no remorse. The magistrate also said "Nothing has been put before me to suggest that these offences were committed for anything other than greed". Thomson was granted bail to appear in the Victorian County Court on 24 November to appeal both his conviction and sentence. Following his conviction and sentencing, on 4 April 2014 the New South Wales branch of the Labor Party expelled Thomson as a member of the party. Thomson was proven guilty of thirteen charges of theft, convicted, and fined A$25,000.

== Financial irregularities within the HSUeast branch ==
Allegations of improprieties in the HSUeast branch were first publicly revealed in The Sydney Morning Herald on 9 September 2011. It was alleged the Thomson (whilst serving as national secretary to the HSU) and Williamson (as the general secretary of the HSUeast) received secret commissions from a major supplier to the union. The supplier, that produces ten issues of the union's newsletter, Health Standard, at a price estimated to be ten times the amount for similar productions, provided both Thomson and Williamson with credit cards that were used for personal expenses, such as private school fees. This was the first occasion that Williamson was implicated in any matter. The media report detailed that Williamson was a director of a computer company, United Edge, that provided information technology services to the HSUeast branch, without going to competitive tender. This decision was made while Williamson was general secretary of HSUeast.

Following the public airing of allegations, Williamson's position as national president of the HSU became untenable, and he was suspended as president in October 2011. In April 2012 he resigned as president from Unions NSW after being asked to explain to its executive why he should not be removed. Williamson's position as the general secretary of HSUeast was dissolved when the Federal Court declared all elected positions vacant in June 2012; appointing an administrator to run the union's affairs.

The final Temby report, delivered in July 2012 at the request of the HSUeast Union Council, made findings that Williamson engaged in irregularities, such as placing family members in union jobs, paying inflated prices for services, and heading United Edge, a company supplying information technology services to the union.

On 4 October 2012, Williamson was charged with more than 50 offences relating to fraud and obstruction of justice, and was suspended as director of United Edge. Appearing before the Sydney Magistrates Court on 15 October 2013, Williamson entered a guilty plea to four major charges related to cheating and defrauding the HSU East branch, creating false documents with the intention to deceive and the recruiting of others to hinder a police investigation. All other charges were dropped. No charges were laid against Williamson's wife or family members. On 3 March 2014, legal counsel for Williamson declined to seek a bail extension and Williamson was imprisoned. He was sentenced in the District Court of New South Wales on 28 March 2014 to seven–and–a–half years of imprisonment; with a non–parole period of five years, ending in March 2019. Following his conviction and imprisonment, on 4 April 2014 the New South Wales branch of the Labor Party expelled Williamson as a member of the party.

== Suspension of the HSU from the Australian Council of Trade Unions ==
In April 2012 the Australian Council of Trade Unions voted to suspend the membership of the HSU on the basis of corruption. Following government action, the Federal Court of Australia removed the union's national executive and appointed judge Michael Moore as administrator.

On 15 May 2012, ACTU president Ged Kearney addressed the ACTU congress on the HSU scandal. "I know I speak for everyone in this room when I say that misuse of member's money and contempt for the accountability to members are unacceptable", she said. Union figure Paul Howes stressed the positive, addressing the congress:

"I'm actually pleased that we know that this happened because it's the lesson for us is making sure it never happens again and never allowing a couple of disgusting individuals get away with stealing money out of the pockets of hard-working, low-paid health workers or any other union members in this country..... "If we have a dodgy trade union official who rips off those workers, we need to hunt them down too, hunt them down to make sure they pay back what they took from the hardworking men and women of the Health Services Union."

— Paul Howes, senior union official, at the 2012 ACTU congress.

Gillard said of the HSU's impact on the Australian union movement's reputation, "...the very poor conduct of one union risks tarnishing that reputation."

== Political ramifications ==
Gillard spoke in support of a parliamentary code of conduct, saying, "I do want to see members of Parliament always doing the right thing. There are various rules now for members of Parliament but I'm obviously open to suggestions that we have a code of conduct." Independent MP Tony Windsor flagged action along with Rob Oakeshott to increase Parliament's powers to deal with cases such as Thomson's. "I think that there is a need for, if people are proven to be guilty in some of these circumstances, that Parliament may need some greater power or have a process where they actually leave the building", he said.

In April 2012 Thomson asked to be suspended from the Labor Party after a discussion with Gillard, and announced his intention to sit on the crossbench as an independent member of parliament. In a statement to the House on 21 May 2012, Thomson professed his innocence and used parliamentary privilege to name a number of individuals and claim that he was set up. He recontested his seat at the 2013 federal election, but lost to the Liberals' Karen McNamara.

In February 2014 the coalition government announced a proposed Royal Commission into trade union governance and corruption to inquire into alleged financial irregularities associated with the affairs of trade unions. The HSU was one of five unions named in the commission's proposed terms of reference. Following criminal proceedings where Thomson was found guilty of theft and fraud charges, the Federal Parliament voted in favour of a motion of "regret" and apologised to the individuals named in Thomson's statement to the House on 21 May 2012. The matter was also referred to Parliament's Privileges Committee to investigate whether Thomson deliberately misled the House.
