= Kathy Jackson =

Australian trade union leader

- Born: Katherine Koukouvaos
- Occupation: Union officer
- Employer: Health Services Union
- Title: National Secretary of the Health Services Union of Australia
- Term: 22 January 2008 – February 2015
- Predecessor: Craig Thomson
- Board member of: HESTA (2008–2011); Australian Council of Trade Unions (Vice President)
- Partner: Michael Lawler
- Children: Three

Kathy Jackson (born c. 1967) was the national secretary of the Health Services Union of Australia (HSU) between January 2008 and February 2015. In August 2015, Jackson was found by the Australian federal court to have misappropriated union funds and was ordered to repay $1.4 million in compensation, with a criminal investigation pending.

== Career ==
Jackson was an official of the Health Services Union's Number Three branch which represents highly skilled health professionals like radiographers, physiotherapists, radiation therapists, speech pathologists, occupational therapists and psychologists from 1992, and was the Secretary of that branch until its merger with HSUeast. In 2008 she was appointed to the position of national secretary, the first female to hold that post.

Jackson is also a member of the Victorian Branch of the Australian Labor Party, as part of its Labor Unity faction, aligned with former Senator David Feeney.

She has taken high-profile positions on a range of issues including corporate and union donations to political campaigns. She told The Australian: "Without restrictions on donations and public funding... we'll end up like the United States with two parties owned by the corporations divided only on lifestyle issues like gay marriage."

Jackson was occasionally critical of the Brumby Labor government in Victoria. During 2007 and 2008, the HSU was embroiled in an enterprise bargaining dispute with the government, during which the Health Minister Daniel Andrews used legal mechanisms under federal law to restrict the union's industrial action. Jackson said at the time: "It's also time that Mr Brumby wakes up and realises that Victorians did not endorse the use of WorkChoices for use against anyone, let alone their health workers. We will bargain lawfully, but we will not lie down."

=== Health Services Union corruption ===
Succeeding Craig Thomson as general secretary of the HSU in January 2008, Jackson was ordered by the National Executive to engage external auditors to investigate Thomson. Reporting in May 2008, the audit raised "concerns about evidence of misuse of union funds by Mr Thomson." In December 2008, the union engaged tax specialists BDO Kendall to "conduct an investigation" over the alleged improper use of Thomson's union-issued corporate credit card. The Sydney Morning Herald revealed the allegations in April 2009. Thomson denied any wrongdoing and stated that an independent audit had not identified any inappropriate use of the card. He noted that other people would have been able to incur charges on the account, and said the accusations had been fabricated by rivals within the HSU.

In 2007 Craig Thomson left the national office. The financial reports had not been put in. I then attempted to put those reports in, but not under my signature because I could not sign off on them because we'd found allegations of corruption in our union. So therefore, I wrote to Fair Work Australia seeking their advice about how to handle this issue and I followed their advice. I followed other professionals' advice, including the auditors and the union solicitors. And for them to come out now and to say that I didn't put the report in in time when I actually followed their process is totally outrageous and scandalous on their part.

— Kathy Jackson, as general secretary of the Health Services Union of Australia, 7 May 2012.

Investigations by Fair Work Australia, the Australian Federal Police, NSW Police, and Victorian Police led to Thomson being charged with 140 offences relating to theft and fraud. He was tried in the Melbourne Magistrates Court and on 18 February 2014 he was found guilty of theft from the HSU and of defrauding the HSU. It was found that Thomson had misused his union credit card to pay for prostitutes, travel expenses and cigarettes, and for accommodation and dinners even after he'd left the union to run for Parliament.

Allegations of improprieties in the HSU East branch (HSUeast) involving Craig Thomson and Michael Williamson, a former national president of the HSU, a former general secretary of HSUeast, and a former union and Labor right-wing factional power broker, were publicly revealed by The Sydney Morning Herald on 9 September 2011. On 4 October 2012, Williamson was charged with more than 50 offences relating to fraud and obstruction of justice, and was suspended as director of United Edge. Appearing before the Sydney Magistrates Court on 15 October 2013, Williamson entered a guilty plea to four major charges related to cheating and defrauding HSUeast, creating false documents with the intention to deceive and the recruiting of others to hinder a police investigation. All other charges were dropped.

In June 2012, during proceedings that related to the appointment of an administrator to HSUeast, Federal Court Justice Geoffery Flick criticised attempts by Jackson, through her solicitors, to directly contact him while proceedings were under way. Jackson subsequently responded by sacking her legal representatives and asking the judge to disqualify himself from the proceedings. At the end of June 2012, Justice Flick ordered that former judge Michael Moore be appointed administrator of HSUeast, that all federal and state branch office holders lose their positions and the branch be demerged to become separate NSW and Victorian-based unions. Justice Flick found that Jackson should not keep her position in the HSUeast because "she is very much at the epicentre of the dispute".

Jackson retained her position as national secretary.

=== Royal Commission ===
Partly as a consequence of Jackson's "whistle-blowing", a royal commission into the broader union movement was established after a change of government at the 2013 federal elections. During the royal commission it came to light that Jackson had spent HSU money on her own personal expenses, including paying Jeff Jackson (her ex-husband) $50,000 of union money. She claimed to have had authorisation to do so, but no records of such authorisation exist.

In August 2015 the Federal Court ruled in a civil case brought against Jackson by the HSU that she had misappropriated union funds. The court found that she had used HSU funds to buy personal items for herself, including through cash withdrawals, misusing three credit cards, as well as funds from a payment made by a cancer hospital in Melbourne to settle a back-pay dispute. She was ordered to pay approximately $1.4 million in compensation. She was also reported to be the subject of a criminal investigation, and had declared herself bankrupt in an attempt to avoid paying compensation. On 7 October 2015, New South Wales police conducted a raid on Jackson's home, removing items from the house as well as from a shipping container in the yard. Jackson was subsequently charged with 70 counts of obtaining property by deception and other fraud-related offences. In October 2020, following a plea deal, she was convicted of two counts of fraud relating to the theft of $100,000 of HSU funds.
