= Thomas v Mowbray =

2007 decision of the High Court of Australia

- Court: High Court of Australia
- Full case name: Joseph Terrence Thomas; Plaintiff v Graham Mowbray, Federal Magistrate & Ors; Defendants
- Decided: 2 August 2007
- Citations: [2007] HCA 33, (2007) 233 CLR 307

Case history
- Prior action: None

Court membership
- Judges sitting: Gleeson CJ, Gummow, Kirby, Hayne, Callinan, Heydon and Crennan JJ

Case opinions
- (5:2) Subdivision B of Division 104 of the Commonwealth Criminal Code, which allows for the making of "interim control orders", is a valid law of the Commonwealth (per Gleeson CJ, Gummow, Callinan, Heydon & Crennan JJ; Kirby J & Hayne J dissenting in separate judgments)

Thomas v Mowbray, was a decision handed of the High Court of Australia on 2 August 2007 concerning the constitutional validity of "interim control orders" under the Commonwealth Criminal Code. The case was brought by Joseph Terrence Thomas (referred to as "Jihad" Jack Thomas by the media), where he sought to challenge the interim control order that had been placed on him by a Federal Magistrate. The High Court ruled, by a 5:2 majority, that interim control orders were constitutional.

== Background facts ==
Thomas had been the first Australian to be convicted under anti-terrorism laws introduced in Australia after the 11 September 2001 attacks in the United States. He was sentenced on 31 March 2006 to five years prison with a non-parole period of two years. The trial was highly controversial, as the evidence used to prosecute Thomas consisted solely of an interview conducted in a Pakistani military prison. Despite claims that the evidence was obtained under duress and that Thomas had been tortured, the judge deemed the interview to be admissible. The conviction was overturned on appeal by the Victorian Court of Appeal in the case of R v Thomas, with the appeals judges ruling that the trial judge should have ruled the evidence inadmissible.

On 27 August 2006, the Federal Magistrates Court (constituted by the first defendant) placed Thomas on an interim control order. The Court's order was made on the following grounds:

- Mr Thomas has admitted that he trained with Al Qa'ida in 2001. Al Qa'ida is a listed terrorist organisation under section 4A of the Criminal Code Regulations 2002, made under the Criminal Code Act 1995 . Mr Thomas also admitted that while at the Al Qa'ida training camp he undertook weapons training, including the use of explosives and learned how to assemble and shoot various automatic weapons.
- There are good reasons to believe that given Mr Thomas has received training with Al Qa'ida he is now an available resource that can be tapped into to commit terrorist acts on behalf of Al Qa'ida or related terrorist cells. Training has provided Mr Thomas with the capability to execute or assist with the execution directly or indirectly of any terrorist acts.
- Mr Thomas is vulnerable. Mr Thomas may be susceptible to the views and beliefs of persons who will nurture him during his reintegration into the community. Mr Thomas's links with extremists such as Abu Bakir Bashir, some of which are through his wife, may expose and exploit Mr Thomas's vulnerabilities.
- Furthermore, the mere fact that Mr Thomas has trained in Al Qa'ida training camps, and associated with senior Al Qa'ida figures, in Afghanistan is attractive to aspirant extremists who will seek out his skills and experiences to guide them in achieving their potentially extremist objectives.
- The controls set out in this interim control order statement will protect the public and substantially assist in preventing a terrorist act. Without these controls, Mr Thomas's knowledge and skills could provide a potential resource for the planning or preparation of a terrorist act.

The order placed the following restrictions on Thomas:

- He must abide by a curfew, confining him to his home from midnight until 5am each morning.
- He is restricted in the phone services he is allowed to operate (one mobile phone, one land line) and must have these approved by the Australian Federal Police. He is prohibited from using public pay phones.
- He is required to seek written approval to make telephone calls.
- He is not to communicate with a list of persons identified as terrorists including Osama bin Laden, Ayman al-Zawahiri and Abu Musab al-Zarqawi
- He must agree to be fingerprinted.
- He must not leave Australia.

== High Court judgment ==
Prior to the Federal Magistrates Court confirming the interim order, i.e. making it permanent, Thomas commenced his special case in the High Court. He joined the magistrate, the Australian Federal Police officer that brought the application for the control order and the Commonwealth as defendants in the action. The Attorneys-General for New South Wales, South Australia and Western Australia intervened, largely in support of the Commonwealth. The Federal Magistrates Court proceedings were, therefore, adjourned by consent of the parties.

The special case that eventually came before the High Court posed the following four questions for the Court's consideration:

Q1 #Is Division 104 of the Criminal Code invalid because it confers on a federal court non-judicial power contrary to Chapter III of the Commonwealth Constitution?

A Subdivision B of Division 104 is valid; otherwise inappropriate to answer

Q2 #Is Division 104 of the Criminal Code invalid because insofar as it confers judicial power on a federal court, it authorises the exercise of that power in a manner contrary to Chapter III of the Commonwealth Constitution?

A Subdivision B of Division 104 is valid; otherwise inappropriate to answer.

Q3 Is Division 104 of the Criminal Code invalid because it is not supported by one or more express or implied heads of legislative power under the Commonwealth Constitution?

A Subdivision B of Division 104 is valid; otherwise inappropriate to answer

Q4 #Who should pay the costs of the special case?

A The plaintiff should pay the costs of the Commonwealth of the special case.

His appeal was therefore dismissed, and the interim control order upheld.
