= AWU affair =

Alleged embezzlement in Australia

The AWU affair refers to allegations of embezzlement via a fund established for the AWU Workplace Reform Association in the early 1990s by Bruce Wilson and Ralph Blewitt, officials of the Australian Workers' Union (AWU). Wilson and Blewitt raised $400,000 from major construction companies, and have been accused of using the funds for personal benefit, including diverting funds for the purchase of a house in Fitzroy.

Julia Gillard, who subsequently became Prime Minister of Australia, was a salaried partner at law firm Slater & Gordon who provided pro-bono legal services to Wilson, with whom she was romantically involved, for the establishment of the Association and for the purchase of the Fitzroy property. Gillard's conduct was the subject of an internal investigation by Slater and Gordon. After stating that she had no intention of leaving Slater & Gordon, Gillard left the firm prior to the conclusion of the investigation, and pursued a career in politics.

The alleged misappropriation of funds and related activities have been the subject of police and media investigation. The AWU has not brought charges against Wilson or Blewitt. Ian Cambridge, the former AWU national secretary and current Fair Work Australia commissioner, who detected the alleged misuse of funds in the 1990s, called for a judicial inquiry into the affair.

Although Blewitt has admitted his role in the matter, Wilson, and Gillard have denied any wrongdoing. The Royal Commission into Trade Union Governance and Corruption investigated the matter and recommended that fraud charges be considered against Wilson and Blewitt, but that there were no grounds for prosecuting Gillard, though her conduct as a solicitor had been "questionable".

== Background ==
In 1992, the legal entity "AWU Workplace Reform Association" was established for Australian Workers' Union state secretary Bruce Wilson and assistant secretary Ralph Blewitt, without the knowledge of the national leaders of the AWU. As part of the formal establishment process, the association was described as being formed for the purpose of "development of changes to work to achieve safe workplaces", and included in its objectives the aim to "support and assist union officials and union members."

In 1993, Wilson arranged the purchase of a house for Ralph Blewitt. It is alleged that the house was part paid for by funds "drawn from accounts directly related to the AWU Workplace Reform Association", with the balance lent by Slater & Gordon.

A police investigation in 1995 and 1996 looked into the possible misappropriation of funds through the association, and in 1996 Ian Cambridge, former national secretary of the AWU and currently a commissioner of Fair Work Australia, lodged an affidavit claiming that Wilson and Blewitt had extorted money from construction companies. A memo written in 1997 by WA police fraud squad Detective Sergeant David McAlpine stated that police suspected that the association was used by Wilson and Blewitt to allegedly fraudulently obtain over $400,000 from major construction companies. At the time, a police investigation did not lead to any charges being laid, and the police decided not to take any further action. However, after new evidence emerged during 2012, Victorian police reopened the investigation.

Slater & Gordon lost the AWU account over the affair.

== Julia Gillard ==
=== Initial involvement and investigations ===
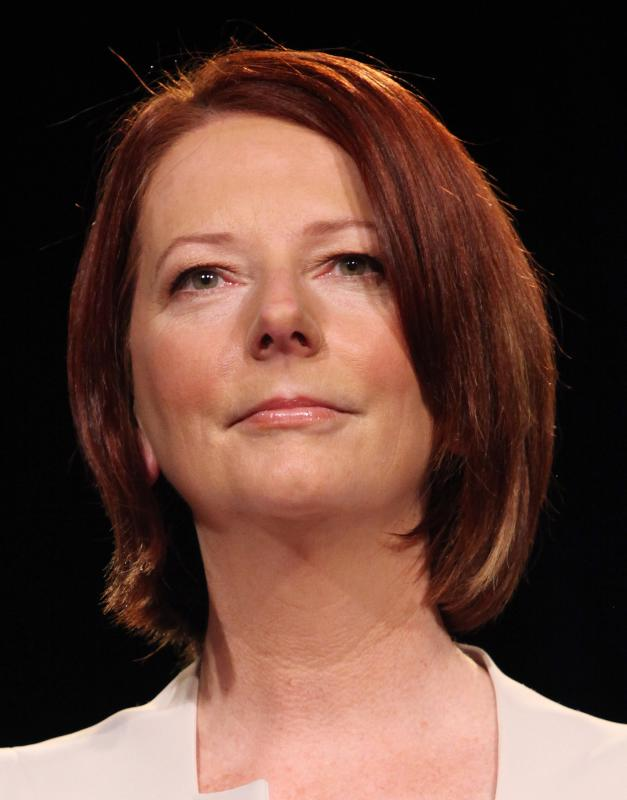
Australian Prime Minister Julia Gillard who was romantically involved with Bruce Wilson at the time of the alleged embezzlement

Julia Gillard worked in the industrial department of Slater & Gordon from 1988 through to 1995. In 1991, while she was a lawyer with the firm Slater & Gordon, Gillard was also in a romantic relationship with Bruce Wilson. Gillard provided legal assistance to help establish the AWU Workplace Reform Association. She was also involved in providing legal services in relation to the purchase of the Fitzroy property by Wilson and Blewitt. Slater & Gordon investigated Gillard's conduct and prior to the conclusion of the investigation, Gillard took leave from the firm and later resigned to pursue her political career.

Gillard has subsequently described the intent of the association as being to assist in the re-election of union officials and as a "slush fund", which commentators have argued as being at odds with the association's stated purpose. Gillard responded by stating that she only provided legal assistance, and that she neither drafted the passage in the legal documentation describing the association's purpose, nor signed the papers. However, she later admitted that she drafted the rules for the association, basing them on the "Socialist Forum" student organisation rules she had earlier established at Melbourne University, and it is alleged that she wrote to the Western Australia Corporate Affairs Commission to deny that the association was a trade union organisation. In compliance with Slater and Gordon's standard procedure of providing free advice for minor matters to unions and their officers, Gillard did not open a formal file within the firm's records system, however she later faced partisan allegations that this was contrary to standard legal practice.

According to a 20 August 2012 press release by Slater and Gordon, upon learning of the AWU/Bruce Wilson allegations in August 1995, it conducted an internal legal review, which found "nothing which contradicted the information provided by Ms Gillard" and in which Gillard denied any wrongdoing.

In 2012, Nick Styant-Browne, a former partner of Slater & Gordon involved in the investigation said that "there was deep disquiet amongst the partnership about Ms Gillard's conduct and it was never necessary for the partnership to resolve that issue because Ms Gillard herself elected to resign". According to a redacted transcript of the interview, Gillard was, at that time, unable to categorically rule out being a beneficiary of the fund, because there was a dispute over one part of the renovations on her own home along with a rumour that the union had been approached about payment of an unpaid, disputed invoice. Subsequently, at her comprehensive press conference in August 2012 and under oath at the subsequent Trade Union Royal Commission, she emphatically stated that she had paid for all her own renovations herself. Styant-Browne stated that the interview was recorded and transcribed, and alleged that Gillard resigned as a result of the investigation. In the assessment of Styant-Browne "trust and confidence had evaporated" between the partners and Gillard. Peter Gordon, an equity partner who investigated Gillard in 1995, said that he found no evidence Gillard was involved in any wrongdoing, and confirmed in 2012 that was still his opinion. Andrew Grech, the Managing Director of Slater & Gordon, also stated that the 1995 investigation found no improper behaviour by Gillard, and said that Gillard did not resign as a result of the investigation, but instead took a leave of absence in order to campaign for a Senate position, and resigned in 1996 to work for the Victorian opposition leader.

Contemporaneously, Phil Gude, a minister in the Victorian Liberal Government, spoke of Gillard's connection to the affair in the Victorian Parliament on 12 October 1995. Gude alleged that Gillard's Senate candidature "may not be the only reason she is no longer working for Slater & Gordon" and that she may have indirectly received a financial benefit through the association, and may therefore have been a recipient of fraudulently obtained funds. In particular, it was alleged that part of her home renovations were paid for out of the fund without Gillard's knowledge, although Gillard has repeatedly denied that this occurred, and no evidence that disproves her account has been produced. The issue was again raised in the Victorian state parliament by a Liberal Party MP in 2001.

In 2012, it was revealed that Ian Cambridge, in investigating the claims, had recorded in his diary on 25 September 1995, that Victorian AWU official Helmut Gries had alleged that union funds had been used to fund renovations on Gillard's home. However, when asked about the matter in 2012, Gries stated that although he considered Cambridge very honest, he did not believe he made the allegation to Cambridge in 1996, and that he would not have been aware of any issues in regard to the renovations.

=== Term of Gillard government ===
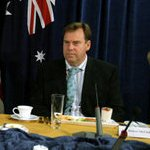
Labor MP Robert McClelland worked as a lawyer for Ian Cambridge, the former AWU national secretary, who detected the alleged misuse of funds in the 1990s. McClelland raised Gillard's connection to the AWU affair during a 2012 speech to the Australian Parliament.

In 2011, reporter Glenn Milne covered the allegations, on the website of The Australian, including a claim regarding Gillard's living arrangements with Wilson. Gillard contacted the chief executive of Milne's paper and threatened legal action over the story. The story was removed and an apology and retraction was posted in its place. Milne based part of the article on a statutory declaration by a former AWU vice president, Bob Kernohan, that had been aired by 2UE presenter, Michael Smith. ABC's television program Media Watch found that the allegation had been considered untrue by News Limited lawyers and removed from an article Milne wrote in 2007. Michael Smith left his position at 2UE over editorial differences that emerged as a result of an interview which he had recorded with Kernohan about the allegations but never aired, and Milne was dropped from his roles at The Australian and the ABC's Insiders program.

The issue was raised in Federal Parliament in June 2012 by Labor MP Robert McClelland. Formerly Attorney General of Australia, McClelland had been demoted by Gillard some six months earlier. In a speech condemning profiteering by union officials, McClelland said that "I know the Prime Minister is quite familiar with this area of the law; as lawyers in the mid-1990s, we were involved in a matter representing opposing clients" and that this had coloured his thinking on legal reforms. McClelland had worked for Ian Cambridge, the former AWU national secretary who had investigated the allegations.

On 23 August 2012, Gillard conducted a surprise and lengthy press conference at which she addressed the allegations in depth for the first time. She restated her innocence of any wrongdoing, and claimed that she was the victim of a sexist online smear campaign. Gillard confirmed her 1995 statement that her understanding of the purpose of the association was that it was a re-election fund for union officials. She also expressed regret that she had neglected to open a file on the case at Slater & Gordon.

In November 2012, The Australian reported that Ian Cambridge recorded in his diary in 1996 that Wayne Hem claimed that Wilson had given him approximately $5,000 in cash after Wilson had spent a night at a casino, and instructed him to deposit the amount into Julia Gillard's bank account. Hem could not confirm that the account was Julia Gillard's, nor was it known where the funds originated from or why they may have been deposited, and Gillard has stated that she has no memory of the deposit being made.

Ralph Blewitt returned to Australia in November 2012 to make a statement to Victoria Police about his role in the alleged fraud. He conducted a series of media interviews and described Wilson as the slush fund mastermind. Blewitt provided statements and a number of files to police in regard to the events in return for immunity from prosecution. Although the statements have not been released, Blewitt alleged that Gillard did not properly witness the signing of a legal power of attorney – an allegation denied by Gillard, who also questioned Blewitt's credibility. Shortly before Gillard's statement, Bruce Wilson spoke to the press and denied that Julia Gillard had any knowledge about the alleged fraud.

The Federal Opposition devoted its questions for the final sitting week of Parliament of 2012 to the affair. Gillard pre-empted the questioning with a second press conference. During the conference she responded to some of the allegations, and attacked the credibility of the recently returned Blewitt, referring to him as a "self-confessed fraudster", a "stooge" and a "sexist pig". Asked in the Parliament by Deputy Opposition Leader Julie Bishop whether she wrote to the WA Commissioner for Corporate Affairs to vouch for the bona fides of the AWU Workplace Reform Association, Gillard refused to answer – once saying only that "The claim has been made but no correspondence has ever been produced" and once saying that she would only answer if the Opposition Leader himself were prepared to ask it. Shadow attorney-general George Brandis alleged in the Senate that Gillard knew the association's funds would not be used for their stated purpose of "workplace reform", which he argued would be a breach of the Associations Incorporation Act (1987). The Consumer Protection Commissioner noted that the objectives of the association were "broad in nature and appear to cover a range of activities".

Following these exchanges, Nick Styant-Browne, released previously redacted sections of the transcript of Gillard’s Slater & Gordon interview, which confirmed Gillard had said she had written to the commission and "suggested that it wasn’t a trade union and argu[ed] the case for its incorporation". The Opposition called on Gillard to resign, a call rejected by Gillard who emphasized that the text of the transcript said she had said the association "wasn't a trade union" (which she said was factually accurate). The original letter had not been located. The Opposition concluded the week with a call for a judicial inquiry.

In January 2013, the Australian Financial Review reported that, in October 2012, journalist Michael Smith sent police a formal complaint alleging that Gillard had created a "false document", a power of attorney, that had enabled the house in Fitzroy to be purchased in 1993 with money from the union "slush" fund.

== Royal Commission findings ==
The Abbott government called a Royal Commission into trade union governance and corruption in 2014. Commissioner Dyson Heydon handed an Interim Report to Governor General on 15 December 2014 which included an examination of the AWU affair. Upon release of the Interim Report, The Age reported that: "Justice Heydon identified key concerns about the use and operation of union election slush funds. They include that they operate largely in secret, have deficient or non-existent record-keeping and that candidates commonly plead ignorance on how money is raised and spent. The report also recommended fraud charges be considered against former Australian Workers Union officials Bruce Wilson and Ralph Blewitt for their use of a secret slush fund in the 1990s. Mr Wilson was the ex-boyfriend of former prime minister Julia Gillard. Justice Heydon said there were no grounds for prosecuting Ms Gillard, but agreed with counsel assisting Jeremy Stoljar's submission, that her conduct as a solicitor had been 'questionable'. Ms Gillard had done legal work setting up the slush fund for Mr Wilson and Mr Blewitt."
