= Cross on Evidence =

- Author: J D Heydon
- Language: English
- Subject: Evidence (law)
- Genre: Textbook
- Publisher: LexisNexis
- Publication place: Australia
- ISBN: 9780409339574

Cross on Evidence is an authoritative textbook on the law of evidence in Australia.

== History ==
The title refers to Sir Rupert Cross, who originally wrote the textbook in the United Kingdom in 1958. A number of editions were published including versions adapted to the law of Australia and New Zealand. The following editions are held in the National Library of Australia.

| Year | Title | Edition | Jurisdiction | Editor |
|---|---|---|---|---|
| 1958 | Evidence | 1st | UK | Sir Rupert Cross |
| 1963 | Evidence, by Rupert Cross | 1st | NZ | D L Mathieson |
| 1967 | Evidence, by Rupert Cross | 3rd | UK | Sir Rupert Cross |
| 1970 | Cross on evidence | 1st | Australia | J A Gobbo, D M Byrne |
| 1971 | Evidence, by Rupert Cross | 2nd | NZ | D L Mathieson |
| 1974 | Evidence | 4th | UK | Sir Rupert Cross |
| 1979 | Cross on evidence | 2nd | Australia | J A Gobbo, D M Byrne, J D Heydon |
| 1980 | Cross on evidence | 2nd supp. | Australia | J A Gobbo, D M Byrne, J D Heydon |
| 1984 | Cross on evidence | 2nd cum. supp. | Australia | J A Gobbo, D M Byrne, J D Heydon |
| 1985 | Cross on evidence | 6th | UK | Colin Tapper |
| 1986 | Cross on evidence | 3rd | Australia | D M Byrne, J D Heydon |
| 1991 | Cross on evidence | 4th | Australia | D M Byrne, J D Heydon |
| 1996 | Cross on evidence | 5th | Australia | J D Heydon |
| 2000 | Cross on evidence | 6th | Australia | J D Heydon |
| 2004 | Cross on evidence | 7th | Australia | J D Heydon |
| 2010 | Cross on evidence | 8th | Australia | J D Heydon |
| 2011 | Cross on evidence | 9th | Australia | J D Heydon |
| 2014 | Cross on evidence | 10th | Australia | J D Heydon |

== See also ==
- Evidence (law)
- Criminal law of Australia
- English criminal law
