= Rowe v Electoral Commissioner =

Judgement of the Australian High Court

- Court: High Court of Australia
- Full case name: Rowe & Anor v Electoral Commissioner & Anor
- Decided: 6 August 2010 (order only); 15 December 2010 reasons and further orders
- Citations: [2010] HCA 46 (2010) 243 CLR 1
- Transcripts: 4 Aug [2010] HCATrans 205; 5 Aug [2010] HCATrans 205; Orders [2010] HCATrans 207

Court membership
- Judges sitting: French CJ, Gummow, Hayne, Heydon, Crennan, Kiefel and Bell JJ

Case opinions
- (4:3) 2006 amendments restricting the enrolment of voters once an election has been called were invalid. per French CJ, Gummow, Bell and Crennan JJ; Hayne, Heydon and Kiefel JJ dissenting

Rowe v Electoral Commissioner is a High Court of Australia case dealing with the requirement of the Australian Constitution that members of Parliament be "directly chosen by the people". The High Court held that Commonwealth legislation that sought to restrict the time in which a person may seek to enroll in an election or alter their enrolment details after the writs for an election have been issued was invalid.

== Background ==
The Constitution is silent as to many aspects of the democratic process, leaving these details to be provided by Parliament. The Constitution does however require that the members of Parliament be "directly chosen by the people". For members of the Senate section 7 of the Constitution provides :

The Senate shall be composed of senators for each State, directly chosen by the people of the State, voting, until the Parliament otherwise provides, as one electorate.

Similarly for members of the House of Representatives section 24 of the Constitution provides:

The House of Representatives shall be composed of members directly chosen by the people of the Commonwealth, and the number of such members shall be, as nearly as practicable, twice the number of the senators.

The High Court had previously held in Roach v Electoral Commissioner that voting in elections lies at the heart of the system of representative government established by the Constitution and that disenfranchisement of a group of adult citizens without a substantial reason would not be consistent with it. A 2006 prohibition on prisoners voting was held to be invalid.

A person must be on the electoral roll to vote. Prior to 2006 there was a window between the announcement of the election and the closing of the rolls and the Electoral Commission processed enrolment and transfer claims for hundreds of thousands of voters between the announcement of the election and the close of the rolls. The amendments arose from recommendations of the Joint Standing Committee on Electoral Matters following the 2004 federal election.

The case concerned the 2006 amendments in the context of the 2010 federal election. On Saturday 17 July 2010 it was announced that there was to be an election, and the Governor General issued a writ of election on Monday 19 July, for an election to be held on Saturday 21 August. The reason for the late challenge is that a person would not have standing to challenge the validity of the legislation unless they sought to have their rights or interests clarified by the orders sought. Both of the Plaintiffs had their enrolment directly affected by the 2006 amendments.

The Electoral Commission indicated to the High Court that if the Court's decision was available by 6 August, it could process claims from the plaintiffs and people in a like position in time for the 2010 election.

=== Enrolling to vote ===
Prior to 2006, a person could enroll to vote up to seven days after the issue of the writs for an election. After the 2006 amendments a person could only enroll to vote prior to issue of the writs for an election. In the context of the 2010 election, under the previous system a person could enroll to vote by Monday 26 July. After the 2006 amendments a person only had until 8 pm, Monday 19 July AEST to enroll to vote. The first plaintiff, Shannen Rowe, could have enrolled to vote once she turned 18 on 16 June 2010 but had not done so at the time the election was announced. Her enrolment form was lodged on Friday, 23 July 2010. Under the old system Ms Rowe would have been enrolled to vote. Under the 2006 amendments however she was too late and would be unable to enroll in time for the 2010 election.

=== Changing voter enrolment ===
Under the old provisions, a person could change their enrolment up to seven days after the issue of the writs for an election. After the 2006 amendments a person could only change their enrolment 3 days after the issue of the writs for an election. In the context of the 2010 election this was Thursday 22 July. The second plaintiff, Doug Thompson, was enrolled as a voter in the Division of Wentworth. However, in March 2010 he had moved to a new address in the Division of Sydney. His change of enrolment form could have been lodged at any time prior to the announcement of the election, however it was not lodged with the AEC until after 8 pm on 22 July. Under the old system Mr Thompson would have been able to change his enrolment. Under the 2006 amendments however he was too late and would be required to vote in the Division of Wentworth.

== Decision ==
The Court heard argument on 4 and 5 August, before announcing its decision on 6 August 2010. The Court, by a bare majority (4:3), ruled that the restrictions imposed by the 2006 amendments were invalid. However, as this case was decided urgently (with the federal election to be held on Saturday, 21 August 2010), the Court did not publish reasons until 15 December 2010.

In separate judgments, Chief Justice French, Justices Gummow and Bell, and Justice Crennan held that these provisions contravened the requirement, contained in sections 7 and 24 of the Constitution, that members of both Houses of the Commonwealth Parliament be "directly chosen by the people". The Chief Justice considered that the adverse legal and practical effect of the challenged provisions upon the exercise of the entitlement to vote was disproportionate to their advancement of the requirement of direct choice by the people. Justices Gummow and Bell, with whom Justice Crennan broadly agreed, held that the provisions operated to achieve a disqualification from the entitlement to vote and that the disqualification was not reasonably appropriate and adapted to serve an end compatible with the maintenance of the system of government prescribed by the Constitution. Justice Crennan held that the democratic right to vote is supported and protected by the Constitution.

In separate dissenting judgments, Justices Hayne, Heydon and Kiefel each held that the provisions did not contravene any limitation imposed by the Constitution on the legislative power of the Commonwealth to fix the date and time after which claims for enrolment or transfer of enrolment may not be considered before an election. Their Honours considered that the requirement of direct choice by the people was not infringed by the provisions challenged.

== See also ==
- Australian constitutional law
- R v Pearson; Ex parte Sipka [1983] HCA 6, (1983) 152 CLR 254.
- Roach v Electoral Commissioner [2007] HCA 43.
- Day v Australian Electoral Officer for the State of South Australia [2016] HCA 20.
- Murphy v Electoral Commissioner [2016] HCA 36.
