= Health Services Union East =

HSU East
- Health Services Union NSW Branch
- Founded: 1991
- Headquarters: Sydney
- Location: Australia
- Members: 35,000
- Key people: Michael Williamson, General Secretary
- Affiliations: ACTU
- Website: www.hsu.asn.au

The Health Services Union East (HSUE) is a specialist health union with over 35,000 members working in all areas of healthcare across New South Wales and Victoria, it was formed by the merger of the NSW Branch with Victorian Branches 1 and 3.

The membership of the union includes doctors and allied health professionals such as physiotherapists and radiographers, ambulance officers, clerical and administrative staff, managers and support staff. The union represents junior doctors in New South Wales only by mandate; doctors who have finished their qualifications are permitted to be represented by the Australian Medical Association and are not usually members of the Health Services Union.

The New South Wales office of the Health Services Union of Australia is located in Sydney.

== Union executive ==
The Union Executive consists of the Union President, 2 Vice presidents, and 5 members of the Union Council including the General Secretary and the Assistant Secretary who, are elected every four years.

The Union Executive are responsible for the preparation of the Union Council agenda, and for the carrying out of the decisions of the Union Council between its meetings.

The Union Executive convene each month.

== Union Finance Committee ==
The Union's Finance Committee consists of the Union's voting Executive who receive reports and recommendations from the General Secretary/Treasurer in relation to the Union's finances. The Finance Committee receives reports of the union's income and expenditure and if necessary sets and monitors budget targets.

The Finance Committee oversee all of the income and expenditure of the Union. It convenes each month.

== Union Council ==
The affairs of the Union are vested in the Union Council which consists of 27 Councillors who are elected by the members every 4 years. Union Council is the Board of Management of the Union and is the peak body of the Union.

Union Council meet bi-monthly and receive recommendations from the Union's Executive and Finance Committee. It also receives regular reports from the Union's Officers.

== Union Sub Branches ==
Sub Branches of the Union may be established by the Union Council at workplaces, where 15 or more members of the Union exists.

An active Sub Branch in each workplace assists all members of the Union in that particular workplace.

A Sub Branch consists of a President, Vice President, Secretary and a number of committee representatives. All members holding these positions are elected at an Annual General Meeting (AGM) which are held between the months February and April of each year. Delegates to Annual Convention are elected at the AGM. It is a requirement that any members nominating for a position of President, Vice President and Secretary should be a financial member of the Union and have at least 12 months continuous financial membership.

A Convention Delegate must have 12 months continuous financial membership, have completed the Union's Level 1 Training Course "Reclaiming Your Rights," and be a Sub-Branch committee member.

Workplaces with fewer than 15 members have no Sub Branch. These workplaces have a representative who acts for members at their request. This is not an elected position.

== Financial controversy ==
Michael Williamson HSUE state secretary and treasurer (and HSU national president) was stood aside in October 2011 pending investigations of breaches of workplace law and alleged financial improprieties.

On 2 May 2012 the Pitt Street offices of the union were raided by New South Wales Police strike force Carnarvon, set up in September 2011specifically to investigate the HSU. Computers were accessed and documents taken by the NSW Fraud and Cybercrime Squad . The raid came weeks after another raid by officers of Carnarvon on the premises of a graphic designer, where documents and computers were also seized. The police were investigating claims that the Communigraphix company gave credit cards, on the owners account, to Williamson and former HSU official Craig Thomson, now a federal Member of Parliament(MP). Communigraphix has a long-term contract to publish the HSUEast magazine Health Standard, worth A$700,000 a year. Thomson was assistant secretary of the HSU NSW branch (now HSU East) from 1999 to 2002.

Later in May the Acting National President of the Health Services Union, Chris Brown, and five other members of the unions' National Executive applied to the Federal Court of Australia for a declaration that HSU East Branch had ceased to function effectively. They sought approval of a scheme to reform the Health Services Union East back into its prior constituent branches; Victoria No 1 Branch, Victoria No 3 Branch and the New South Wales Branch, as they existed prior to 24 May 2010. Additionally, all elected offices in the East Branch were to be declared vacant and an Administrator appointed until the election of new officials. A directions hearing was to be held before Justice Flick in the Federal Court at 9.30 am on 11 May 2012.
