= Rob Stary =

Australian criminal defence lawyer

Robert Stary is an Australian consultant at R&S Stary Lawyers, having retired as a Magistrate form the Moorabbin Magistrates' Court. He is well known for defending Julian Assange, as well as Jack Thomas, the first Australian to be convicted under anti-terrorism laws introduced in Australia after the 11 September 2001 terror attacks in the United States. Stary has been a vocal critic of the legislation and speaks out regularly against the issue. As such, he is often the go-to lawyer for Australian terror suspects. He has represented terrorism suspects which included the coordination of the legal team in the Pandanus 2005 prosecution, the Tinnie Terrorists 2019 prosecution acting for its leader Musa Cerantonio, the representatives of the Tamil Rehabilitation Office 2010 prosecution and the successful defence of Australian fighters supporting the Kurdistan Workers Party and the YPG. He also acted for Harun Causevic in the successful defence of the ill-conceived prosecution of the ANZAC Day terror plot in 2015. Causevic became the first Victorian to ever be held under highly secretive Preventative Detention Order (PDO) when he was detained without charge.

Stary is also famous for his defence of powerful Melbourne underground figures Tony Mokbel and Carl Williams. He was also instructed by Jason Roberts that ultimately resulted in his successful appeal against conviction in the Silk Miller murder case and the successful jury retrial.

== Early life and education ==
Robert Stary grew up in the western suburbs of Melbourne, and attended St John's College, Braybrook and the University of Melbourne where he studied law from 1977 to 1980, and graduated with a Bachelor of Laws degree. Whilst studying, Stary co-founded the Western Suburbs Legal Service with Peter Gordon, and was involved in a number of human rights advocacy groups.

== Legal career ==
After graduation, Stary gained a position as a solicitor at Victoria Legal Aid, practicing in criminal law. He later worked for and became a partner in the prominent Australian law firm Slater and Gordon. He established his own practice in 1995, Robert Stary Lawyers, which became Stary Norton Halphen in 2015. During his career, Stary also helped found the Western Suburbs Legal Service in 1979 with lifelong friend Peter Gordon. He is currently a consultant at R&S Stary Lawyers.

Stary was the first Chairperson in 1999 of the Visy Cares Youth Junction founded in Sunshine. He was also the Chair of the Westadd Alcohol and Drug Agency in Footscray. He was a volunteer, committee member and chair of Western Suburbs Legal Service and Footscray Community Legal Centre.

Stary has also appeared on an advertisement authorised by the ACTU calling for employees in the construction industry to be governed by the same laws as other workers. More recently, he has appeared in court on behalf of those charged as a result of certain incidents during the West Gate Bridge industrial dispute. In those proceedings, he urged that Industrial Relations Minister Julia Gillard be charged with contempt of court over "inflammatory" and "calculated" remarks she made at an ACTU Congress in Brisbane. Victorian Magistrate Mr Muling found that he was not persuaded to charge Ms Gillard with contempt, nor refer her to the DPP.

Stary also represented crime underworld figure Carl Williams before Williams was beaten to death in Barwon Prison on 19 April 2010. Stary heavily criticised Premier John Brumby's refusal to call a Royal Commission inquiry into the death. He alluded to the likelihood of high level corruption at that time which ultimately proved to be correct. In 2014 he confirmed with journalists Anthony Dowsley the role of Lawyer X and corrupt police in their compromising of the justice system.

In 2005 Stary also received the Law Institute's Paul Baker Human Rights Award.

Stary has been active in the criminal justice system as a spokesperson and was the Law Institute of Victoria Chairperson of the criminal law section in 2001 and 2002 as well as a former general committee member (criminal law) for the Law Council of Australia.

Stary is an adjunct professor in the College of Law and Justice at Victoria University.

== See also ==
- Australian Anti-Terrorism Act 2005
