= Kenneth Hayne =

Australian judge (born 1945)

The Honourable Kenneth Hayne AC KC
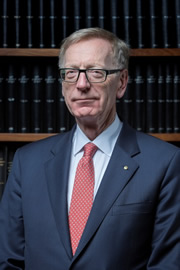

Justice of the High Court of Australia
- In office 22 September 1997 – 4 June 2015
- Nominated by: John Howard
- Appointed by: William Deane
- Preceded by: Sir Daryl Dawson
- Succeeded by: Michelle Gordon

Personal details
- Born: Kenneth Madison Hayne; 5 June 1945 (age 81) Gympie, Queensland, Australia
- Spouse(s): Margaret Colquhoun; Michelle Gordon
- Children: 5
- Education: University of Melbourne; Exeter College, Oxford

Kenneth Madison Hayne (born 5 June 1945) is a former Justice of the High Court of Australia, the highest court in the Australian court hierarchy.

== Early life and education ==
Hayne was born in Gympie, Queensland and attended Scotch College, Melbourne. He graduated with a Bachelor of Arts and a Bachelor of Laws (Honours) from the University of Melbourne, during which time he resided at Ormond College. Hayne was Editor of the Melbourne University Law Review. He then graduated with a Bachelor of Civil Law from Exeter College, Oxford University. He was also a Rhodes Scholar.

He is the husband of another High Court Judge, Michelle Gordon.

== Career ==
Kenneth Hayne was admitted as a barrister and solicitor of the Supreme Court of Victoria in 1971 and was appointed as a Queen's Counsel (QC) in 1984.

=== Judicial activity ===
Kenneth Hayne joined the bench in 1992 when he was appointed as a judge of the Supreme Court of Victoria. From 7 June 1995 he sat on the Court of Appeal of the Supreme Court of Victoria, which is the highest court in the Australian State of Victoria.

Hayne was appointed as a Justice of the High Court in September 1997. He retired in 2015 upon reaching the mandatory retirement age of 70, in accordance with Section 72 of the Australian Constitution. He was replaced on the High Court by his wife, Federal Court judge Michelle Gordon.

Hayne has been described as being a part of a 'core' of judges during his time on the High Court, usually forming the majority, and often writing joint reasons with Justice William Gummow. One notable exception was Hayne's dissent in Thomas v Mowbray, where he joined Justice Michael Kirby in holding the Commonwealth's regime of interim control orders applied in respect of suspected terrorists to be unconstitutional. Another, more recent, example is Kuczborski v Queensland [2014] HCA 46 in which Hayne J was the sole dissenter.

He serves as a commercial court judge, applying English Common Law, on the ADGM (Abu Dhabi Global Market) Courts.

=== Royal Commissioner ===
In December 2017 Hayne was appointed to head the Royal Commission into Misconduct in the Banking, Superannuation and Financial Services Industry. The inquiry received continual media coverage and the report was delivered on 1 February 2019.

=== Later public life ===
In July 2019 (published in early August), in his first public statement since the commission, Hayne diagnosed an increasing demand for royal commissions as a symptom that "[t]rust in all sorts of institutions, governmental and private, has been damaged or destroyed". In his view, the public sees Australia's “opaque” decision-making processes as “skewed, if not captured” by powerful vested interests, while leaders are “unable to conduct reasoned debates about policy matters” but instead resort to the “language of war” and seek to “portray opposing views as presenting existential threats to society as we now know it”. He noted, in particular, political reactions to the Uluru Statement from the Heart.

In August 2020, Hayne called upon all sides in politics to end "dialogue of the deaf", as in hyper-partisan conflict over climate change and over the Indigenous voice to parliament proposed in the Uluru Statement. He hoped that the COVID-19 pandemic would encourage governmental institutions to trust the public more with the truth, so that in response the public might have greater trust in them.

== Notable judgments ==
- Al-Kateb v Godwin [2004] indefinite detention of a stateless person
- Thomas v Mowbray [2007] concerning the validity of interim control orders
- Roach v Electoral Commissioner [2007] concerning the validity of Commonwealth legislation preventing prisoners from voting
- HML v The Queen; SB v The Queen; OAE v The Queen [2008] relevance and admissibility of evidence, as well as directions to jury.
- Rowe v Electoral Commissioner [2010] concerning the validity of Commonwealth legislation restricting the time in which a voter may seek to enrol in an election
- South Australia v Totani [2010] issue regarding the separation of powers and in particular, parliament directing the courts
- Australian Electoral Commission v Johnston [2014] (sitting alone as the Court of Disputed Returns) invalidating the Western Australian Senate election from the 2013 federal election

== Honours ==
Hayne received Australia's highest civil honour when he was appointed a Companion of the Order of Australia (AC) in 2002 for service to the judiciary, to the law as an outstanding scholar, barrister and jurist, and to the community in the advancement of both legal and general education. Hayne is a patron of the Oxford University Commonwealth Law Journal.

== See also ==
- Judiciary of Australia
- List of Judges of the Supreme Court of Victoria
