= Dyson Heydon =

Former Australian judge and barrister

The Honourable Dyson Heydon KC

Justice of the High Court of Australia
- In office 1 February 2003 – 28 February 2013
- Nominated by: John Howard
- Appointed by: Peter Hollingworth
- Preceded by: Mary Gaudron
- Succeeded by: Patrick Keane

Personal details
- Born: 1 March 1943 (age 83) Ottawa, Ontario, Canada
- Parent(s): Muriel Heydon (née Slater); Sir Peter Heydon
- Education: University of Sydney; University of Oxford
- Occupation: Barrister, Judge, Academic

John Dyson Heydon (born 1 March 1943) is an Australian former judge and barrister who served on the High Court of Australia from 2003 to 2013 and the New South Wales Court of Appeal from 2000 to 2003, and previously served as Dean of the Sydney Law School. He retired from the bench at the constitutionally-mandated age of 70 and went on to chair the Royal Commission into Trade Union Governance and Corruption between 2014 and 2015, an appointment that was politically controversial due to his avowed conservatism and connections with the governing conservative party.

In 2020, an independent investigation conducted for the High Court found that he had sexually harassed six female associates. Further allegations were reported by the Sydney Morning Herald.

Heydon denied the claims and apologised for any "inadvertent and unintended" offence. He did not apply to renew his practising certificate with the New South Wales Bar Association upon its expiry in 2020. Three of the associates sought compensation from the federal government and Heydon. In 2022 the trio settled with the federal government, reportedly for a "six figure" amount. Later, in 2022, Heydon resigned from the Order of Australia.

== Personal life and legal career ==
Heydon was born in Ottawa, Canada, in 1943, to Muriel Naomi (née Slater) and Peter Richard Heydon (later Sir Peter). His father, a diplomat and public servant from Sydney, met his mother (a Canadian) while both were on the staff of Richard Casey, the Australian Ambassador to the United States. Heydon was raised in Sydney, attending the Shore School, before going on to receive a BA in history (with the University Medal) from the University of Sydney, where he was a resident of St. Paul's College. His thesis concerned Napoleon. He was then awarded a Rhodes Scholarship to attend University College, Oxford, where he received an MA and a BCL and was awarded the Vinerian Scholarship.

In 1967, Heydon became a fellow of Keble College, Oxford and, after graduating in 1968, he began teaching at the University of Ghana in 1969. In 1973 he returned to Australia and was admitted to the New South Wales Bar Association in 1973. At age 30, he became a professor of law at the University of Sydney, the youngest person to reach that position. Heydon was elected dean of the University of Sydney Law School in 1978, serving a one-year term. He left to become a barrister, working at Selborne Chambers, where his colleagues included future High Court colleague William Gummow and New South Wales Supreme Court judge Roddy Meagher. He was appointed a Queen's Counsel (QC) in 1987 on the advice of Michael Kirby. In 1999, the Supreme Court of NSW found Heydon negligent in the advice he had given to the NRMA in 1994 concerning its demutualisation. The ruling was overturned on appeal. The appeal judgment set a precedent on professional negligence.

In 1977, Heydon married Pamela Elizabeth Smith, with Gummow as the best man. They had four children. Pamela Heydon died on 13 June 2017 at the age of 66.

== Legal publications ==
Heydon is also a legal scholar. His books are mainly doctrinal treatises, designed principally as information to assist practitioners in their advice and pleadings. His 1971 book The Restraint of Trade Doctrine continues in a fourth edition. In 1975, he published Cases and Materials on Equity, the ninth edition of which came out in 2019. With Sir James Gobbo and David Byrne, he co-authored the second Australian edition of Cross on Evidence in 1980 and became sole author of subsequent editions. He has also taken over from his former colleague, at Sydney University and on the High Court, William Gummow as one of the editors of Meagher, Gummow and Lehane's Equity: Doctrines and Remedies. He is also a co-author of Jacobs' Law of Trusts in Australia.

In 2019, Heydon published with the major legal publisher Thomson Reuters the volume Heydon on Contract: Cases and Materials on Contract Law in Australia. In 2025, he published the follow-up volume Heydon on Contract: Particular Contracts, which was self-published because he had lost his contract with Thomson Reuters due to a sexual harassment scandal (below). In a foreword to the latter, former High Court colleague Michael Kirby described the two volumes taken together as "encyclopedic", "a brilliant ... exercise in taxonomy", "a masterly analysis" and a "magnum opus". The former received a new edition in 2022, titled Australian Law of Contract and edited by Elizabeth Peden.

== Judicial career ==
Heydon was appointed a Justice of the Court of Appeal of the Supreme Court of New South Wales in 2000, and appointed a Justice of the High Court of Australia in February 2003. His appointment to the High Court by the Howard government was generally welcomed, and Attorney-General Daryl Williams noted Heydon's strong work ethic. There was some disapproval, however, because Heydon replaced the only female justice, Mary Gaudron, making the court then all-male, and because of his opposition to judicial activism.

After his first full year on the bench, Heydon was noted for his close alignment in opinions with the Chief Justice Murray Gleeson, as well as Justices Gummow and Kenneth Hayne, in constitutional law cases. He reached the same outcome as the Chief Justice in all but one case and frequently wrote joint judgments with the latter pair.

As he approached the constitutionally mandated retirement age of 70, Heydon's rate of dissent increased markedly, tripling to 47.6 percent from 2010 to 2011. Because of this, as well as his tendency to write a separate opinion for each case (even where he agreed with other justices), he was described by some as "The Great Loner" of the court. He was the sole dissenter in Plaintiff M70/2011 v Minister for Immigration and Citizenship, relating to the Gillard government's "Malaysian solution" for asylum-seekers, and in Williams v Commonwealth, relating to the federal government's funding of school chaplains. He also dissented in the case of Charles Zentai (writing in favour of his extradition to Hungary), and in the challenge to the Australian government's plain tobacco packaging legislation (writing in favour of British American Tobacco).

=== Judicial philosophy ===
Heydon was known as a conservative judge, and spoke out against what he termed "judicial activism". His publicly expressed views, set out while a senior New South Wales judge, criticised the evolution of the High Court under the two immediately preceding Chief Justices, Sir Anthony Mason and Sir Gerard Brennan, were described by contemporaneous commentators as a "job application" for appointment to the High Court by the government of Liberal Party Prime Minister John Howard. Heydon did not join any majority decision in his last year on the High Court, and in a 2013 article in the English Law Quarterly Review argued that "compromise is alien to the process of doing justice according to law". Legal academics have also noted several cases in which Heydon was the lone dissenter, starting his judgments with the words "I dissent", which was described by Gabrielle Appleby as "pugnacious and irrefutably terse". Heydon's time on the High Court cemented his reputation as a leading "black-letter lawyer", meaning that he preferred a literal interpretation of the law. On retiring from the High Court in 2013, he said he wore this reputation as a "badge of honour".

Heydon tended to take a conservative approach to human rights. He commented that, "The odour of human rights sanctity is sweet and addictive. It is a comforting drug stronger than poppy or mandragora or all the drowsy syrups of the world". (Note: "Not poppy, nor mandragora, Nor all the drowsy syrups of the world" is a quotation from Shakespeare's play Othello, Act III, Scene 3.) His judgments went against the continued expansion of the implied freedom of political communication—notably in Rowe v Electoral Commissioner, where, according to James Allan, he "betrays real anger at where the majority judgments are taking constitutional interpretation" instead of Heydon's preference for originalism.

== Royal Commission into Trade Union Governance and Corruption ==
On 13 March 2014, Heydon was appointed to conduct a Royal Commission into trade union governance and corruption on the recommendation of the Abbott government.

Heydon handed down the Commission's interim report in December 2014 and found that the Construction, Forestry, Mining and Energy Union (CFMEU) acted in "wilful defiance of the law". Dyson recommended that criminal charges of blackmail be considered against John Setka, the Secretary of CFMEU Victoria, along with charges against other senior CFMEU officials in Queensland and New South Wales for activities that included death threats, extortion, gross neglect, and other "serious criminal matters". The Age reported that "Justice Heydon identified key concerns about the use and operation of union election slush funds ..."

He also recommended that fraud charges be considered against former Australian Workers Union officials for their use of a secret slush fund in the 1990s. One of the officials implicated was an ex-boyfriend of Julia Gillard, a former Labor prime minister. As a lawyer, Gillard had assisted the union by providing legal advice to establish the slush fund. No charges were laid against Gillard, although Heydon agreed with counsel assisting Jeremy Stoljar's submission, that her conduct as a solicitor had been "questionable". The report recommended that charges be considered against seven past and present Health Services Union officials for their role in an alleged right of entry scam.

In 2015, while the Royal Commission was still sitting, Heydon agreed to deliver the Sir Garfield Barwick Address, an event organised by a branch of the Liberal Party. He later withdrew, saying he had overlooked the political connection. As part of his explanation, Heydon said that he did not use a computer and could not send or receive emails himself. On 21 August, the ACTU, AWU and CFMEU all made applications for Heydon to step down on the ground of "apprehended bias". On 31 August, Heydon rejected the applications in detail, saying, "The mere fact that a person agrees to deliver a speech at a particular forum does not rationally establish that the person is sympathetic to, or endorses the views of, the organiser of that forum".

Heydon submitted his final report to the Governor-General on 28 December 2015, finding "widespread and deep-seated" misconduct by union officials in Australia. It referred 40 people and organisations to authorities, including police, Directors of Public Prosecution, the Australian Securities and Investments Commission and the Fair Work Commission, and it recommended the establishment of an independent body to investigate union records and finances. Only one conviction resulted from the process, while five other union officials either had their charges dropped or had been found not guilty.

== Sexual harassment findings and allegations ==
In June 2020, an investigation on behalf of the High Court found that Heydon had sexually harassed six female associates while he was a member of the Court. The Chief Justice of Australia, Susan Kiefel apologised to the women on behalf of the Court, and announced new measures to protect judges' personal staff, and to improve the handling of complaints. The same month, the Sydney Morning Herald published the results of its own investigation in which several women alleged that they had been sexually harassed by Heydon. The newspaper also said that "Mr Heydon's predatory behaviour was an 'open secret' in legal and judicial circles."

Heydon denied the claims and apologised for any "inadvertent and unintended" offence. He did not apply to renew his practising certificate with the New South Wales Bar Association upon its expiry on 30 June 2020.

Three of the associates sought compensation from the Commonwealth and Heydon. In February 2022 the Commonwealth Attorney-General and the associates' lawyers announced that the three had settled with the Commonwealth, with terms not to be disclosed (although some reports refer to a "six figure" amount).

On 14 October 2022, Heydon resigned from the Order of Australia (having previously been appointed as a Companion).

== Aftermath ==
Since then, Heydon has experienced a degree of rehabilitation, although controversy remains. His invitation to address the 2023 annual conference of the conservative Samuel Griffith Society passed without complaint, but an invitation in 2025 led to the Society's law student chapter at the Australian National University dissolving itself in protest and to a published protest by one of his victims.
