= Slater & Gordon =

Australian law firm

Slater + Gordon Lawyers
- Founded: 1935
- Founder: Bill Slater and Hugh Gordon
- Headquarters: Melbourne, Australia
- Number of locations: Over 40 offices in Australia.
- Key people: Chair and non-executive director James Merlino, CEO Dina Tutungi (Australia)
- Parent: Allegro Funds (2023-present)
- Website: www.slatergordon.com.au www.slatergordon.co.uk

Slater & Gordon Lawyers is a law firm in Australia. The firm was founded in Melbourne, Victoria, in 1935 by a barrister and solicitor from Irymple, Victoria, Hugh Lyons Gordon, and Labor politician Bill Slater. Since April 2023, the law firm has been owned by private equity firm Allegro Funds.

The firm is one of Australia's largest consumer law firms, and in May 2007 the firm incorporated and was one of the first law firms in the world to go public when its shares were quoted on the Australian Securities Exchange. In 2012, Slater & Gordon entered the UK market with the acquisition of several UK based law firms, and became one of the UK's largest consumer law firms. In 2014 the firm was ranked as the 7th largest international law firm operating in the UK by revenue.

In December 2017, Slater & Gordon's lenders and shareholders approved a recapitalisation of the company via a Scheme of Arrangement. The recapitalisation involved a significant reduction of the Company's secured debt, the UK operations and subsidiaries being separated from its Australian operations, such that the Company no longer owns the UK operations and the issuance of new shares to the Company's senior lender group representing 95% of the Company's issued capital.

In early 2023, Australia-based private equity firm Allegro Funds implemented an off-market bid to acquire Slater & Gordon, and completed the acquisition in April 2023, after which it ceased trading.

== Founders ==
=== Bill Slater ===
Bill Slater was born to parents of an Irish background in Wangaratta on 20 May 1890. When Slater was a child his father left the family, leaving his mother to raise him and his two siblings in Prahran. Slater attended Armadale State School but left to sell newspapers. An incident in which he was caught skinny dipping in the Yarra River led to a brief period of self-reflection. During this period, Slater chose to better himself and began reading vigorously at a public library in an attempt at self-education. His endeavour was successful and he was eventually hired as an office boy, later being employed as a clerk for Percy Park, a Mildura solicitor. After various misadventures, including an arrest for support of John Curtin, relocations to and from England and Australia, Slater entered partnership with Hugh Gordon—his brother in law—forming Slater & Gordon.

=== Hugh Gordon ===
Hugh Lyons Gordon, born to David Ferguson Gordon and Mary Gordon, was a barrister and solicitor from Irymple in country Victoria, who, in 1935, along with his brother-in-law, Bill Slater, founded the law firm Slater & Gordon.

In September 1941, during World War II while in Melbourne, Gordon enlisted in the Royal Australian Air Force. After training as an Observer, he became a Flying Officer (Navigator). He was sent to England where he was subsequently posted to 460 (Australian) Squadron who by this time were flying the Avro Lancaster bomber.

Gordon was killed on 15 June 1943 when the Lancaster he crewed was shot down by Luftwaffe flying ace Manfred Meurer. Two men escaped the crash to become POWs; the remaining five, including Gordon, are buried in Jonkerbos War Cemetery, Gelderland, Nijmegen, Netherlands. Gordon was 34 years old when he was killed, he was married to Elspeth Campbell Gordon, from Ulonga, New South Wales

== Legal representation ==
Over the years Slater & Gordon has handled some of the most complex and widely publicised cases in Australia. These include representing hundreds of asbestos miners at the Wittenoom mine in Western Australia. In 1994 and 2000, the company lodged writs in the Victorian Supreme Court against BHP on behalf of traditional owners in Papua New Guinea over the Ok Tedi Mine's environmental impacts on the Ok Tedi and Fly Rivers stemming from the abandonment of the Lukwi Tailings dam (after a major landslide on 7 January 1984). Other cases include representing victims of medically acquired HIV from contaminated blood supplies, and women suffering health problems due to faulty IUDs and breast implants.

In December 2005, the firm negotiated a settlement with James Hardie worth $4.5 billion on behalf of unions and people suffering from asbestosis, mesothelioma and other asbestos-related diseases as a result of exposure to asbestos while working for the company.

In 2017 the Supreme Court of Victoria approved a $70 million settlement in the landmark Manus Regional Processing Centre detainee class action run by Slater & Gordon. The action is believed to be the largest human rights class action settlement in Australian legal history and was brought on behalf of 1,923 detainees who were held at the Manus Regional Processing Centre between November 2012 and May 2016

== Slater & Gordon UK ==
Slater & Gordon entered the UK market in 2012 with the acquisition of UK law firm Russell Jones and Walker. The firm has completed further acquisitions of a number of other law firms within the UK to become one of the largest personal injury law firms based in the UK. The acquisitions have included: Fentons, Goodmans Law, Taylor Vinters, John Pickering and Partners, Pannone and most recently, Leo Abse & Cohen and Walker Smith Way. The UK based practice areas can be divided into two distinct categories: personal legal services and business legal services. The largest practice areas in the personal legal services division includes personal injury, clinical and medical negligence, employment, and family law litigation. The business legal services division includes regulatory law and defence, employment and general business advisory. Additionally, the firm represents the Police Federation of England and Wales. It also has a number of specialist practice groups including media, libel and privacy. The firm is the largest provider of family law services in the UK. It also has a 14% share of the personal injury and clinical negligence market, making it the leader in its field by some margin.

On 30 March 2015, Slater & Gordon announced the acquisition of the professional services division of Quindell for £637m. Since then, the U.K.'s Financial Conduct Authority has required Quindell to restate a previously reported profit as a loss. Britain's Serious Fraud Office has launched an investigation into Quindell and Slater & Gordon commenced legal action against the vendor over the sale.

Following the recapitalisation of Slater & Gordon Limited in December 2017, the UK firm is owned and operated separately and is no longer part of the Slater and Gordon Limited group of companies.

== Slater & Gordon Australia ==
The firm is one of the largest consumer law firms in Australia. Slater & Gordon provide a range of specialist legal services including personal injury law, medical law, employment law and military law.

In May 2007 Slater & Gordon became one of the first law firms in the world to go public when it was floated on the Australian Securities Exchange.

Trading in the company's shares was temporarily suspended during the last week of February 2016 pending the announcement of financial results revealing losses of approximately AU$1 billion, though a large part of the loss related to the writing down of Quindell assets.

In December 2017, Slater & Gordon's lenders and Shareholders approved a Recapitalisation of the company via a Scheme of Arrangement. The Recapitalisation also involved the Company's UK operations and subsidiaries being separated from its Australian operations, such that the Company no longer owns the UK operations.

Following the recapitalisation a new board and CEO have been appointed. The board of directors at Slater & Gordon Limited comprises: Chair, non-executive director James MacKenzie, non-executive director Merrick Howes, non-executive director Elana Rubin, non-executive director Hayden Stephens, non-executive director Nils Stoesser and non-executive director Jacqui Walter. Former KPMG Australian National Managing Partner (Advisory), John Somerville, was appointed CEO in February 2018.

== Notable past employees ==
- Julia Gillard, the 27th Prime Minister of Australia, was an industrial lawyer from 1986 to 1995 and became a partner.
- Jonathan Rothfield, a former managing partner (he became a partner in 1971) who saved the firm from financial ruin at a time of crisis for the business. On 24 December 1985, Rothfield assumed sole ownership of Slater & Gordon when the firm was on the verge of collapse, and for a four-year period worked and succeeded in stabilising the firm and returned it to profit. Rothfield personally bore much of the financial burden to keep the business afloat, even mortgaging his own home. Former Prime Minister, Julia Gillard, commented on Rothfield in an interview when she said, "I also learnt a great deal from Jonathan Rothfield who was the sole owner of Slater and Gordon. He's a man who is very hard-working and a very ordered thinker".
- Peter Gordon, current president of the Western Bulldogs in the Australian Football League.
- Adam Bandt, the first Australian Greens MP elected to the House of Representatives at a general election and the party's leader since February 2020, was a solicitor and partner with the firm from 1997 to 2008.
- Rob Stary, criminal defence lawyer, known for defending Julian Assange and Jack Thomas
- Jackie Trad, former Deputy Premier of Queensland as General Manager, Class Actions (2022–2023)
