= Registered Organisations Commission =

Australian government agency

Agency overview
- Formed: 1 May 2017
- Preceding agency: Fair Work Commission
- Dissolved: 6 March 2023
- Superseding agency: Fair Work Commission
- Jurisdiction: Commonwealth of Australia
- Headquarters: Melbourne
- Minister responsible: Tony Burke, Minister for Employment and Workplace Relations
- Agency executive: Mark Bielecki (2017–2023), Commissioner
- Parent agency: Fair Work Ombudsman
- Website: www.roc.gov.au

The Registered Organisations Commission (ROC) was an independent, statutory authority of the Australian Government, responsible for the regulation and education of registered organisations (that is, trade unions and employer organisations) in Australia. The ROC was established on 1 May 2017 under the Fair Work (Registered Organisations) Amendment Act 2016 (Cth) and was abolished on 6 March 2023, with its functions transferring to the Fair Work Commission.

The role of the ROC includes the following functions:

- assessing the financial reports, annual returns, and disclosure statements by organisations and their branches;
- arranging elections for organisations and their branches;
- approving governance and compliance training;
- providing education, assistance and advice to organisations; and
- conducting inquiries and investigations into breaches of registered organisation legislation.

The legislation establishing the ROC (originally put into the Australian Parliament as the Fair Work Amendment (Registered Organisations) Bill 2014) was one of the double dissolution triggers for the 2016 federal election under section 57 of the Australian Constitution. Following the election, the Turnbull government was successful in passing the legislation establishing the ROC with the vote of Senators Pauline Hanson, Nick Xenophon and Derryn Hinch.

Ahead of the 2022 Australian federal election, the Australian Labor Party led by Anthony Albanese promised to abolish the ROC, with Albanese calling it “discredited and politicised”, a decision that was criticised by some parties. Following the election, the Government passed the Fair Work Legislation Amendment (Secure Jobs, Better Pay) Act 2022 which abolished the ROC and transferred its functions to the Fair Work Commission. The abolition took effect on 6 March 2023.

The Registered Organisations Commissioner, in office from the establishment of the ROC on 1 May 2017 until its abolition on 6 March 2023, was Mr Mark Bielecki, a former South Australian Regional Commissioner at the Australian Securities and Investments Commission.
