= R v Thomas =

Australian terrorism trial

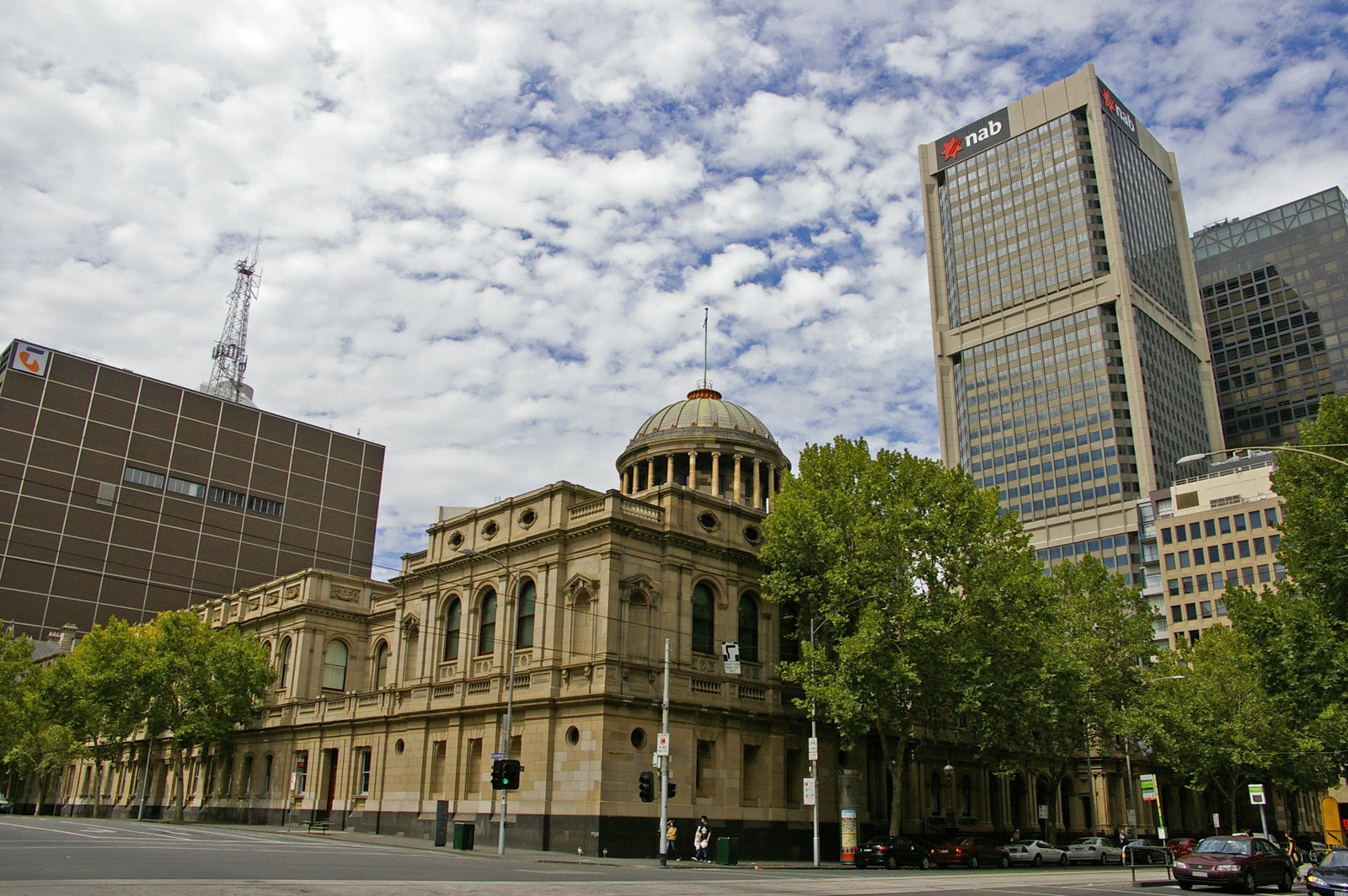
- Court: Court of Appeal of Victoria
- Full case name: The Queen v Joseph Terrence Thomas
- Decided: 18 August 2006
- Citation: [2006] VSCA 166

Case history
- Prior action: DPP v Thomas [2006] VSC 120 (trial)
- Subsequent actions: R v Thomas (No 2) [2006] VSCA 166 (adjournment of further proceedings); R v Thomas (No 3) [2006] VSCA 300 (order for retrial)

Court membership
- Judges sitting: Maxwell P, Buchanan & Vincent JJA

Case opinions
- the admissions made in the 8 March 2003 interview were not made voluntarily, and were not admissible as evidence (per curiam); alternatively, "it would be contrary to public policy for this Court to condone what was a knowing non-compliance with the legal protection afforded by Australian law" (per curiam)

R v Thomas was an Australian court case decided in the Victorian Court of Appeal on 18 August 2006. It concerned the conviction in February 2006 of Joseph Thomas (nicknamed "Jihad Jack" in the media) on terrorism-related charges, specifically receiving funds from Al Qaeda. The appeal revolved around the admissibility of a confession Thomas made during an interrogation in Pakistan in 2003. The court found that the evidence, which was crucial to Thomas' convictions, was inadmissible because it had not been given voluntarily. The court accordingly quashed his convictions, but after further hearings ordered on 20 December 2006 that he be retried rather than acquitted.

== Background to the case ==
Joseph Thomas is an Australian citizen. On 23 March 2001 he left Australia and travelled by air to Pakistan, crossing into Afghanistan by land. For the next three months, he was alleged to have trained at the Al Farouq training camp near the city of Kandahar, before travelling to Kabul in July 2001. Over the next eighteen months or so, Thomas stayed in various Al Qaeda safe houses, and is alleged to have made contact with several Al Qaeda officials.

On 4 January 2003, Thomas was apprehended by Pakistani immigration officials at an airport in the city of Karachi, and taken into custody. Thomas had with him items including an Australian-issue passport, an airline ticket for travel to Indonesia, and about $3,800 in cash. The passport, issued on 19 May 1993, had been tampered with, for the intention of concealing the details of Thomas' movements after his departure from Australia in 2001. He was blindfolded, and driven to an unknown location, where he was questioned for about two hours by two Pakistani men and two Americans.

He was questioned several times over the next few days, before being taken to another location, which Thomas described as "some sort of mansion house", where he was kept in a small cell for the next two weeks and questioned on a number of occasions. Initially he maintained a fabricated story, that he was a student who had been travelling in Pakistan, but he later revealed the truth, that he had been in contact with Al Qaeda in Afghanistan. He said that he was motivated to change his story by several incidents, including one in which one of the Pakistani interrogators pulled on the collar of his hood, so as to strangle him, and incidents in which interrogators said that he would be electrocuted and executed. According to Thomas, he was then told that his cooperation was welcome and that he would be returned home.

After the two weeks, Thomas was blindfolded and shackled, and flown to Islamabad, where he remained in custody. There he was visited by an Australian consular representative, who later gave evidence that Thomas did not appear to have been maltreated, or denied food or water. However, the representative did testify that while Thomas was on the phone to his parents in Australia, he told them "I'm not going to Cuba" (referring to the Guantanamo Bay detainment camp), to which a Pakistani official replied, "No, that's not correct."

Between 25 January and 29 January, Thomas was interviewed four times by members of the Australian Federal Police (AFP) and by members of the Australian Security Intelligence Organisation (ASIO), accompanied by Pakistani officials. During one of these interviews, a Pakistani official said to Thomas "we told you that you have to prove it... that you are not a terrorist... you have to prove it that you are an innocent man and why you are sitting here." Thomas was then transferred again, this time to the city of Lahore, where he was kept for another three weeks, and interrogated by Pakistani officials and an American official referred to as "Joe". This man suggested that Thomas return to Afghanistan with a recording device, to obtain information on Al Qaeda figures, a suggestion Thomas rejected because he feared he would be killed. Joe also threatened Thomas that he would be sent to Afghanistan where he would be tortured by having his testicles twisted, and implied that agents would be sent to Australia to rape Thomas' wife. Thomas was then returned to Islamabad.

On 8 March, Thomas was interviewed again by two members of the AFP, who had made special arrangements with the Pakistani Directorate for Inter-Services Intelligence (ISI) to have the interview conducted pursuant to Australian law, particularly the requirements of the federal Evidence Act 1995 and Crimes Act 1914, so that admissible evidence could be gathered. ISI allowed the interview, but with a very limited timeframe, and did not allow Thomas to have access to legal advice. During this interview, Thomas made several self-incriminatory statements, which were key to his later convictions and the admissibility of which was the central issue in the appeal. In the statements, Thomas admitted that he had tampered with his passport to conceal the amount of time he had been in Pakistan, and also admitted that the money and airline ticket had been given to him by Tawfiq bin Attash, a high ranking Al Qaeda lieutenant involved with the 1998 United States embassy bombings and the USS Cole bombing. On 10 March, the AFP wrote again to the ISI, reiterating the requirements of the Australian legislation, and saying that "the admissibility of [the record of interview] in Australian Courts has been seriously compromised."

On 6 June 2003, Thomas was released from Pakistani custody, at which point he was deported to Australia. He spent nearly a year and a half subsequently living with his family in the Melbourne suburb of Werribee, Victoria, before he was arrested by the AFP on 18 November 2004 and charged with several federal offences, including one count of possessing a false passport (an offence under the Passports Act 1938), and one count of receiving funds from a terrorist organisation and two counts of providing resources to a terrorist organisation (offences under the Criminal Code Act 1995).

=== Trial ===
Thomas was tried in the Supreme Court of Victoria. On 26 February, was found guilty of the passport charge and the receiving funds charge (although he was acquitted of the providing funds charges). He was later sentenced on 31 March, to a total of five years' imprisonment with a two-year non-parole period.

With respect to the admissibility of the record of the 8 March interview, the trial judge (Justice Cummins) had instructed the jury that:

"Normally, failure to avail an interviewee of [the right to legal access] would be fatal to the admission of a subsequent interview... However, the requirement is not absolute, nor can it be... it is not hollow to say that the suspect had the right to choose whether to proceed without that legal access. He had the right to choose not to answer, and wait for the legal bus which might never arrive, or to answer, in the legitimate aim of ultimate return to Australia. To say such a choice is no choice at all is revisionism."

In his assessment, the judge said that the AFP interviewers had conducted the interview "fairly and properly", and had not attempted to use Thomas' lack of legal representation to their favour.

The trial judge also concluded that Thomas had been properly informed of his right to silence, and had not been induced by the AFP officers to participate in the interview by offer of repatriation or any other reward. Ultimately he decided that Thomas had participated voluntarily in the interview, and that in the circumstances, Thomas' lack of legal advice should not make the record of the interview inadmissible.

== Arguments ==
Lex Lasry QC, on behalf of Thomas, argued that the trial judge had made several errors of law:

1. the trial judge should have found that the 8 March interview was not voluntary and hence inadmissible, and
2. even if it had been voluntary, the trial judge should have excluded it anyway on grounds of fairness or public policy.

Several other matters were also raised, relating to particular parts of the evidence (specifically, relating to the witness testimony of Yahya Goba, one of the Buffalo Six), but these matters had little bearing on the final outcome of the case, and were dealt with only briefly by the court. The central argument raised was that, with regard to all the circumstances, Thomas did not actually have a practical choice whether to speak or not.

The other main argument was an alternative argument, that if the court decided that the admissions were in fact voluntary, they should not have been admitted anyway on the basis that to do so would be unfair, because of factors including Thomas' lack of access to legal advice even where he had a right to obtain it, his vulnerability in the circumstances, and "the contamination of the record of interview by the previous joint team interrogations, and their potential or actual use as levers to remind the applicant of his earlier answers."

Two other parties sought to be involved in the case as amici curiae, Amnesty International (represented by former Federal Court Justice Ron Merkel), and the Victorian human rights advocacy group the Human Rights Law Resource Centre. However both their applications were rejected, because they could not assist the court in a way in which they could not otherwise be assisted, and their submissions were largely subsumed into submissions made by Lasry in any event.

== Judgment ==
In a unanimous decision, the three judges decided that the appeal should be allowed (more specifically, that leave to appeal should be granted and the appeal heard and allowed instanter – at once), on the basis that the 8 March 2003 interview was not voluntary and so was inadmissible, and by admitting it the trial judge had made an error of law resulting in a miscarriage of justice.

=== Voluntariness of the interview ===
The court quoted from a 1948 judgment of future Chief Justice of Australia Owen Dixon, followed unanimously by the High Court of Australia in later decisions, in which he said that:

"At common law a confessional statement made out of court by an accused person may not be admitted in evidence against him upon his trial for the crime to which it relates unless it is shown to have been voluntarily made. This means substantially that it has been made in the exercise of his free choice. If he speaks because he is overborne, his confessional statement cannot be received in evidence and it does not matter by what means he has been overborne. If his statement is the result of duress, intimidation, persistent importunity, or sustained or undue insistence or pressure, it cannot be voluntary. But it is also a definite rule of the common law that a confessional statement cannot be voluntary if it is preceded by an inducement held out by a person in authority and the inducement has not been removed before the statement is made..."

The court also noted a recent decision of its own, in which it had emphasised that the principles of evidence strike a balance between the rights of the individual and the rights of the state, and that:

"On the one hand, there is an obvious need to bring to account those who have committed serious offences if the objectives of the criminal justice system are to be achieved and societal values vindicated, but, on the other, it cannot be forgotten that those values incorporate the rights of the individual and, in part define the nature of the relationship between the citizen and the community in which he or she resides."

The court considered that Thomas had been regularly informed by all those who had interrogated him that the degree to which he cooperated would determine what happened to him, and that given their position as authority figures, Thomas would have readily perceived that they had the ability to change his situation; indeed, none of the interviewers had done anything to dispel the idea that they would be able to help Thomas. The court also pointed out that even if actions such as showing Thomas photographs of his family and letters from them could not be said to be deliberately improper, as the trial judge seemed to indicate would be necessary to characterise them as inducements, there was no way that they could be interpreted by someone in Thomas' position, other than as indications that if he cooperated he would be reunited with his family. Particularly, after Thomas expressed happiness at seeing the photographs, one of the interviewers took them away, saying "[we] might give you another look at that later", comments which were "calculated, if not intended, to remind the applicant that he was dependent on his captors and interviewers for favours."

The court rejected the opinion of the trial judge that Thomas viewed the 8 March interview differently to the other interviews, which were concerned only with intelligence gathering. Rather, they emphasised how similar the interviews all were: "same place, same AFP personnel, same topics." They considered that the inducements offered in the previous interviews, and indeed the threats and intimidation in previous interviews by the American "Joe" and others, all "remained operative, their power undiminished" in 8 March interview.

Lastly, the court rejected the argument that the admissions were voluntary because Thomas knew he had a right to silence, because he did not have any practical opportunity to exercise the right. The court concluded that the trial judge had made an error by separating the interview from the circumstances, and that in the circumstances Thomas had no real choice whether to answer questions: "Even the threat 'Confess or be tortured' can be said to involve a choice, and a chance that torture may not be applied. But it could never be regarded as a free choice in the relevant sense."

Ultimately, the court found that the admissions were not given voluntarily, and so were not admissible.

=== Discretion to exclude evidence ===
Although it was unnecessary to decide the alternative argument, the court addressed it briefly anyway. After considering previous cases on the issue, the court considered whether the Australian investigators acted fairly. They concluded that "only one course [was] properly open to the investigating officials in the light of the position taken by the Pakistani authorities. It was to acknowledge that no formal record of interview could be conducted so long as the applicant was in Pakistan since, as the investigating officials appreciated, any such interview would be unlawful, that is, would be contrary to Australian law."

The court also referred to a judgment of Justice McHugh of the High Court, in which he said that although there is some discretion as to whether evidence obtained where an interviewee does not have access to legal advice should be admitted or not, judges are not free to make the decision "by reference to general notions of fairness."

The court concluded that the trial judge had erred in not exercising his discretion to bar the evidence from being admitted, although it was not necessary to decide the point.

== Consequences ==
Thomas' original convictions were quashed, however before the final orders were made the Commonwealth Director of Public Prosecutions sought to make a submission as to whether there should be a directed acquittal or whether there should be a retrial. The court heard brief arguments, then set aside the issue for a further hearing, to be held after the parties had made written submissions. The prosecution sought to introduce as evidence statements Thomas made in an interview with the Australian Broadcasting Corporation for the Four Corners television program in February 2006.

The parties made submissions, and there was an oral hearing on 1 December 2006. All parties accepted that the relevant test to be applied was the test set out in the High Court case of DPP (Nauru) v Fowler, which sets out two preconditions for a retrial; the first requiring that the admissible evidence presented at trial be "sufficiently cogent" to support a conviction, the second requiring consideration of circumstances that would make it unjust to put the accused through a retrial. However this case had an unusual feature, namely that the evidence that the prosecution would seek to use at a retrial had not been available at the original trial, through no fault of the prosecution, since although the interviews had been taken at that time they had not been published. Ultimately all parties agreed that all evidence, not just evidence submitted in the original trial, should be considered when applying the first part of the Fowler test.

The court decided that it would be reasonably possible for a jury to convict Thomas based on the available evidence, so it then considered whether there were factors which would make a retrial unjust. Thomas' lawyer Lex Lasry argued that the delay in Thomas' prosecution (he was not arrested until seventeen months after he returned to Australia) and the extensive media coverage of the case meant it was unlikely Thomas would get a fair trial, and that a retrial would be an undue hardship on Thomas given that he has spent long periods in custody, mostly in solitary confinement, without conviction, which has led to him being diagnosed with depression and post-traumatic stress disorder. The court was of the opinion that a fair trial was not impossible in these circumstances, and although the other factors were considered, the court ultimately decided that the circumstances did not preclude a retrial.

As such, the court ordered on 20 December 2006 that Thomas be retried. Thomas was then released on bail, with requirements to report three times a week and not to leave Australia. Thomas and his family were in court to hear the verdict, his mother crying and Thomas looking "more like a startled rabbit [than a terrorist]."

In the retrial in 2008 Thomas was found not guilty of the terrorism charges but was found guilty of a passport offence, which carries a maximum penalty of two years' imprisonment. Thomas had already served nine months. Justice Curtain ordered that Thomas be imprisoned for nine months but found he was free to go after taking into account time already served.

=== Commentary ===
The decision was praised by civil libertarians. Former President of the Victorial Council of Civil Liberties, Robert Richter QC, said that the decision was important "because the pressure is to say, 'Well, do anything' if the case is said to be a terrorist case. That is unacceptable, the Court of Appeal has said it's unacceptable." University of Melbourne evidence law professor Andrew Palmer said that "I think that it was a little bit naive to think that they could interview somebody and gather admissible evidence... when that person was being held in conditions which were possibly oppressive... I don't really know what they were thinking."

The decision has also attracted criticism. Conservative columnist Piers Akerman said that the decision "has handed al-Qaeda, Jemaah Islamiyah and all other terrorist organisations a major victory and confirmed the adage the law is an ass." Akerman emphasised that information about Thomas (including the Four Corners interview) was already available in the public domain for the populace to make its own judgment, despite "judicial commands to juries to ignore material [which] may have some minor relevance in their petty fiefdoms."

Conservative Melbourne lawyer Peter Faris QC called for an appeal to the High Court or changes to the laws of evidence legislation, saying that "this case is bad law", alternatively suggesting that Thomas be handed over to Pakistan, since he stated that the evidence from the interview would in his opinion be admissible in a Pakistani court. Faris also argued that there was an issue of apparent bias arising with respect to the presiding judge in the appeal, Maxwell P, which could afford grounds for invalidating the appeal. Pakistani law of evidence does not permit a confession made to a police officer to be admitted into evidence. Faris argued that the apparent bias arose because of Maxwell's activities before his appointment to the Supreme Court of Victoria, including his membership of organisations including Amnesty International, his past presidency of Liberty Victoria, his past involvement with human rights law and advocacy against counter-terrorism laws. Faris drew a comparison with the House of Lords case which considered the extradition of Augusto Pinochet, which was overturned on appeal because of Lord Hoffman's failure to disclose his links to Amnesty International.

Because of the ongoing proceedings relating to whether Thomas should be acquitted or retried, neither the Government of Australia nor the Opposition commented immediately after the case, although Treasurer Peter Costello later said that anti-terrorism legislation did not need to be strengthened in the wake of the case, and Opposition foreign affairs spokesperson Kevin Rudd said that "What is plain from the events of yesterday is that the Government has bungled – and bungled badly – the prosecution of this case."

Gerard Henderson said that the case "highlights an emerging division within democracies" between civil liberties advocates on the one hand and "a democracy defence lobby, which maintains that radical Islamism poses a real and present danger to Western nations" on the other.
