= Joseph T. Thomas =

Australian citizen (born 1973)

Joseph "Jihad Jack" Terrence Thomas
- Born: 1973 (age 52–53)
- Criminal charge: Terrorism-related offenses
- Criminal penalty: 5 years in prison with a non-parole period of 2 years (later overturned on appeal)

Joseph "Jihad Jack" Terrence Thomas (born 1973) is an Australian citizen who undertook pistol, light firearm and demolition training with Al-Qaeda. Osama Bin Laden visited his training camp three times while he was in attendance and he shook hands with him. He was convicted for receiving funds from Al-Qaeda, which was later overturned on appeal. Thomas, commonly referred to in Australian media as "Jihad Jack", was acquitted of providing resources that would assist in a terrorist act before becoming the first Australian to be placed under a control order under the Australian Anti-Terrorism Act 2005.

== Terrorism conviction ==
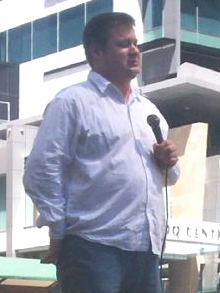
Thomas' brother Les speaks at an anti-war rally.

Joseph Terrence Thomas was the first Australian to be convicted under anti-terrorism laws introduced in Australia after the 11 September 2001 attacks in the United States. He was sentenced on 31 March 2006 to five years prison with a non-parole period of two years. Thomas's lawyer, Rob Stary, described the not guilty verdicts on the more serious charges as a "significant victory".

Attorney-General of Australia Philip Ruddock said after news of the conviction,

The convictions of Mr. Thomas for the terrorist offence and the offence related to passport manipulation demonstrate the seriousness with which these issues are dealt with by the law and highlights the consequences of becoming involved in these activities.

This was in relation to his travels to Pakistan and Afghanistan, after he married and converted to Islam. Thomas left Australia for Pakistan on 23 March 2001, and returned home on 6 June 2003. Since his arrest, Thomas was referred to in the media as "Jihad Jack". When he converted to Islam the self described Aussie battler took on the name Jihad, Arabic for struggle.

== Conviction overturned ==
The trial was highly controversial, as the evidence used to prosecute Thomas consisted solely of an interview conducted in a Pakistani military prison. Despite claims that the evidence was obtained under duress and that Thomas had been tortured, the judge deemed the interview to be admissible. The conviction was overturned on appeal by the Victorian Court of Appeal in the case of R v Thomas, with the appeals judges ruling that the trial judge should have ruled the evidence inadmissible.

== Control order ==
On 28 August 2006, following the quashing of the convictions, Thomas was the first person to be issued with a control order under the Australian Anti-Terrorism Act 2005 after written consent was provided by the Australian Attorney-General Philip Ruddock. The control order places the following restrictions on Thomas:

- He must abide by a curfew, confining him to his home from midnight until 5am each morning.
- He is restricted in the phone services he is allowed to operate (one mobile phone, one land line) and must have these approved by the Australian Federal Police. He is prohibited from using public pay phones.
- He is required to seek written approval to make telephone calls.
- He is not to communicate with a list of persons identified as terrorists including Osama bin Laden, Ayman al-Zawahiri and Abu Musab al-Zarqawi
- He must agree to be fingerprinted.
- He must not leave Australia.

Australian federal magistrate Graham Mowbray made the assessment that Thomas was capable of launching a terrorist attack and that his wife had links to the alleged spiritual leader of Jemaah Islamiah, Abu Bakar Bashir. Thomas and his wife have stated that his wife was a friend of a friend of the woman who became Bashir's wife. Sidney Jones of the International Crisis Group says the link is a case of mistaken identity based on surname. Since granting the control order, Magistrate Mowbray criticised the inclusion of Osama Bin Laden on the list of people with whom Thomas must not have contact. He also criticised the timing of the order, which interrupted a holiday Thomas was having with his family.

Thomas unsuccessfully appealed the making of the control order to the High Court of Australia.

== Retrial ==
On 20 December 2006, Thomas was ordered to face a retrial, based on an interview with the Australian Broadcasting Corporation's Four Corners television program. On 23 October 2008, Thomas was found not guilty of the terrorism charges but was found guilty of a passport offence, which carries a maximum penalty of two years' imprisonment. Thomas had already served nine months. Justice Elizabeth Curtain on 29 October 2008 ordered that Thomas be imprisoned for nine months but found he was free to go after taking into account time already served. "No other penalty is appropriate in the circumstances of this case other than a sentence of imprisonment," Justice Curtain said. She ordered that Thomas be released immediately on a Commonwealth recognisance order to be of good behaviour for the five days remaining of his sentence once the 265 days of pre-sentence detention had been taken into account. He was also required to pay a $1000 bond. Thomas was represented by former Victorian Deputy Premier Jim Kennan.

== See also ==
- Islamic terrorism and Australia
- Thomas v Mowbray
