= Michael Williamson (Australian unionist) =

Australian trade union official (born 1953)

- Born: Michael Alexander Williamson; 26 June 1953 (age 73)
- Occupation: Former trade union official
- Known for: Health Services Union expenses affair
- Status: In prison
- Criminal charges: Fraud; Fabricating invoices; Hindering police; (15 October 2013)
- Penalty: 7½ years' custody, with a non–parole period of 5 years (28 March 2014)

Details
- Imprisoned at: 28 March 2014

Michael Alexander Williamson (born 26 June 1953) is an Australian former trade union official implicated in the Health Services Union of Australia (HSU) expenses scandal. In October 2013 Williamson pleaded guilty to two charges of fraud totaling nearly A$1 million, one charge of fabricating invoices and another charge of recruiting others to hinder a police investigation. The same day that he pleaded guilty, Williamson declared himself bankrupt. An earlier independent report commissioned by the union detailed that companies associated with Williamson and his family had allegedly fraudulently received more than $5 million from the union in period from 2006 to 2011. In the District Court of New South Wales in March 2014, Williamson was sentenced to seven–and–a–half years of imprisonment; with a non–parole period of five years.

== Biography ==
Williamson rose to prominence as an official of the HSU, representing the interests of low-paid workers in the health sector in New South Wales and then Australia. Williamson was general secretary of HSU NSW branch, later to become HSUeast, serving in this role between 1997 until June 2012. He was elected as the inaugural national president of the union in 2003 until October 2011. During his term as national president he controversially merged the NSW and two Victorian branches of the union to create HSUeast. He was elected as the national president of the Australian Labor Party, serving between 2009 and 2010; and was a vice president of NSW Labor. Williamson was also a vice president of Unions NSW until April 2012, when he resigned after being asked to explain to its executive why he should not be removed. He was a member of the national executive of the Australian Council of Trade Unions (ACTU); a trustee of First State Super; and a non-executive director of SGE Credit Union, a credit union for NSW Government employees.

=== Health Services Union expenses affair ===
Allegations of improprieties in the HSUeast branch were first publicly revealed in The Sydney Morning Herald on 9 September 2011. It was alleged that Craig Thomson (while serving as national secretary of the HSU) and Williamson (as the general secretary of HSUeast) received secret commissions from a major supplier to the union. This was the first occasion that Williamson was implicated in any matter. The media report detailed that Williamson was a director of a computer company, United Edge, that provided information technology services to the HSUeast branch, without going to competitive tender. This decision was made while Williamson was general secretary of HSUeast.

Following the public airing of allegations, Williamson's position as national president of the HSU became untenable, and he was suspended as president in October 2011. In April 2012 he resigned as President from Unions NSW after being asked to explain to its executive why he should not be removed. Williamson's position as the general secretary of HSUeast was dissolved when the Federal Court declared all elected positions vacant in June 2012; appointing an administrator to run the union's affairs.

The final report by Ian Temby AO QC and Dennis Robertson, an accountant, delivered at the request of the HSUeast Union Council in July 2012, made findings that Williamson engaged in irregularities, such as placing family members in union jobs, paying inflated prices for services, and heading United Edge, a company supplying information technology services to the union. Meanwhile, NSW Police officers raided the union's Sydney office on 2 May 2012, seizing documents and computers as part of the "Strike Force Carnarvon" investigation into secret commissions allegedly received by Williamson and Thomson. Williamson was intercepted in a basement attempting to remove a bag of documents.

On 4 October 2012, Williamson was charged with more than 50 offences relating to fraud and obstruction of justice, and was suspended as director of United Edge. Appearing before the Sydney Magistrates Court on 15 October 2013, Williamson entered a guilty plea to four major charges related to cheating and defrauding HSUeast, creating false documents with the intention to deceive and the recruiting of others to hinder a police investigation. All other charges were dropped. No charges were laid against Williamson's wife or family members. On 3 March 2014, legal counsel for Williamson declined to seek a bail extension and Williamson was imprisoned. He was sentenced in the District Court of New South Wales on 28 March 2014 to seven–and–a–half years of imprisonment; with a non–parole period of five years, ending in March 2019.

In addition to criminal charges, HSUeast filed civil proceedings against Williamson. Prior to his guilty plea, the union and Williamson reached agreement on the terms of settlement via mediation supervised by Robert McClelland, a former Labor Attorney-General. The terms of the settlement included judgement against Williamson for $5 million in the Supreme Court, set aside his claimed pay rates back to 2003 resulting in the union reducing defined benefits superannuation liabilities to Williamson by approximately $1.1 million; eliminated in excess of $600,000 worth of claimed leave entitlements; and received a public letter of apology to members of the Health Services Union, that the union published:

As you would be aware from media commentary I was charged by the NSW Police over a number of matters relating to the Financial Operations of the Union when I was General Secretary.

The charges laid by Police will shortly be before the Local Court and at that time I intend to enter a plea of Guilty to a number of charges. The matter will now be remitted to the District Court for sentencing.

I wish to place on record my sincere apology to all of you. You placed your trust in me when I was the General Secretary and I abused that trust. I apologise unreservedly to all of you for my actions which were not in keeping with the position I formerly held. I have agreed to assist the Union in recovery actions against others, and will honour that agreement.

The Court will determine the penalty I am to receive, but it won't remove the fact that I have to live with the matter until the day I die.

Please do not desert the Union over this issue as the Union did nothing wrong. It was me that did the wrong thing and I accept responsibility for my wrongdoing.

— Michael Williamson

Following his conviction and imprisonment, on 4 April 2014 the New South Wales branch of the Labor Party expelled Williamson as a member of the party.
