= Health Services Union =

Australian trade union

- Founded: 1911 (as Hospital and Asylum Attendants and Employees Union Australia)
- Headquarters: Melbourne
- Location: Australia
- Members: ▲112,786 (as at 31 December 2024)
- Key people: Gerard Hayes (National President); Lloyd Williams (National Secretary)
- Affiliations: ACTU
- Website: hsu.net.au

The Health Services Union (HSU) is a specialist health union with around 102,000 members working in the healthcare and social assistance industries across Australia.

The membership of the union includes doctors, and allied health professionals such as physiotherapists and radiographers, ambulance officers, clerical and administrative staff, managers and support staff.

The HSU National Office is located in Melbourne, Victoria. Its current National Secretary is Lloyd Williams.

== Branch structure ==
The HSU is a federated union, with branches in every state and territory of Australia. Each branch of the HSU covers different workers depending on the state they reside, their workplace and their occupation. Below is a list of the nine branches of the HSU.

- HSU NSW/ACT/QLD
- HSU SA/NT
- HSU TAS (trading as the Health and Community Services Union – HACSU)
- HSU VIC No. 1 (trading as the Health Workers Union – HWU)
- HSU VIC No. 2 (trading as the Health and Community Services Union – HACSU)
- HSU VIC No. 3 (trading as the Victorian Allied Health Professionals Association – VAHPA)
- HSU VIC No. 4 (trading as the Medical Scientists Association of Victoria; Victorian Psychologists Association and; Association of Hospital Pharmacists)
- HSU WA

== History ==
The union officially came into existence in 1991 with the amalgamation of two existing unions, the Hospital Employees' Federation (HEF) and The Health and Research Employees Association (HREA). But its origins date back to the early years of the twentieth century when organisations of hospital employees were first formed in Australia.

Over the years the membership of the unions that eventually came together to form the HSU has been based around a nucleus of hospital staff and psychiatric care staff. But it has gone much further to include ambulance, aged care, community health, disability sector, hospital scientists, mental health and drug and alcohol workers.

=== Financial controversy ===
A former HSU national Secretary, Craig Thomson, faced allegations from 2008 that he used an HSU union credit card to pay for escorts and other financial improprieties with the card. Amid the allegations, the Australian Council of Trade Unions (ACTU) suspended the HSU's membership. Thomson maintains his innocence, but in May 2012, a report by Fair Work Australia recommended that civil court action be taken against Thomson for what the report says was a "substantial misuse of members' funds". On 31 January 2013, Thomson was arrested and was expected to face 150 fraud charges in Wyong Local Court.

Following regulatory and administrative investigations, criminal trials and a subsequent appeal, on 15 December 2014, Thomson, a former Labor politician, was found guilty in the Victorian County Court of thirteen charges of theft and convicted and fined A$25,000. Forty-nine charges of obtaining financial advantage by deception were dismissed following an earlier finding in the Melbourne Magistrates Court on 18 February 2014 against Thomson of defrauding the HSU in order to pay for personal expenses. On 25 March 2014, Thomson was convicted on 65 charges of fraud and theft for using Health Services Union funds for personal benefit and sentenced to twelve months imprisonment, with nine months suspended over two years. Thomson's legal team immediately lodged an appeal against the conviction and sentence and was granted bail.

=== Disaffiliation from NSW Labor ===
In 2021, following polling commissioned by the union, the HSU NSW branch officially disaffiliated from the NSW Labor Party after a vote. Union leaders cited NSW Labor's poor polling performance, lack of support for Labor among membership and lack of belief that supporting Labor would be worth the finances.
