= Electoral results for the Division of Barton =

Australian division election results

This article lists electoral results for the Division of Barton in Australian federal elections from the division's creation in 1922 to the present.

== Members ==
Member	Party	Term
Frederick McDonald	Labor	1922–1925
Thomas Ley	Nationalist	1925–1928
James Tully	Labor	1928–1931
Albert Lane	United Australia	1931–1940
H. V. Evatt	Labor	1940–1958
Len Reynolds	Labor	1958–1966
Bill Arthur	Liberal	1966–1969
Len Reynolds	Labor	1969–1975
Jim Bradfield	Liberal	1975–1983
Gary Punch	Labor	1983–1996
Robert McClelland	Labor	1996–2013
Nickolas Varvaris	Liberal	2013–2016
Linda Burney	Labor	2016–2025
Ash Ambihaipahar	Labor	2025–present

== Election results ==
=== Elections in the 2020s ===
==== 2025 ====
2025 Australian federal election: Barton
Party	Candidate	Votes	%	±%
Labor	Ash Ambihaipahar	47,098	47.12	−0.87
Liberal	Fiona Douskou	24,162	24.17	−5.23
Greens	Manal Bahsa	15,885	15.89	+4.88
One Nation	Christos Nicolis	5,573	5.58	+0.72
Trumpet of Patriots	Thomas Pambris	3,814	3.82	+3.82
Libertarian	Vinay Kolhatkar	3,419	3.42	+3.31
Total formal votes		99,951	90.69	−1.35
Informal votes		10,256	9.31	+1.35
Turnout		110,207	91.26	+1.94
Two-party-preferred result
Labor	Ash Ambihaipahar	65,971	66.00	+4.01
Liberal	Fiona Douskou	33,980	34.00	−4.01
Labor hold		Swing	+4.01	

==== 2022 ====
2022 Australian federal election: Barton
Party	Candidate	Votes	%	±%
Labor	Linda Burney	46,206	50.43	+1.24
Liberal	John Goody	23,992	26.19	−7.30
Greens	Taylor Vandijk	11,441	12.49	+3.46
United Australia	Dimitri Honos	5,611	6.12	+3.83
One Nation	Phillip Pollard	4,373	4.77	+1.11
Total formal votes		91,623	92.52	+2.05
Informal votes		7,405	7.48	−2.05
Turnout		99,028	89.72	−1.46
Two-party-preferred result
Labor	Linda Burney	60,054	65.54	+6.13
Liberal	John Goody	31,569	34.46	−6.13
Labor hold		Swing	+6.13	

Alluvial diagram for preference flows in the seat of Barton in the 2022 federal election. The winning candidate got over 50% of first preference votes, so this alluvial diagram is indicative only, and preference flows were not used to determine the final result. The preference flows were used to determine the two-candidate-preferred.

=== Elections in the 2010s ===
==== 2019 ====
2019 Australian federal election: Barton
Party	Candidate	Votes	%	±%
Labor	Linda Burney	44,227	49.19	+1.44
Liberal	Pramej Shrestha	30,109	33.49	−1.90
Greens	Connor Parissis	8,123	9.03	+0.20
One Nation	Phillip Pollard	3,288	3.66	+3.66
Christian Democrats	Sonny Susilo	2,103	2.34	−1.89
United Australia	Ben Tung Liu	2,057	2.29	+2.29
Total formal votes		89,907	90.47	−1.18
Informal votes		9,473	9.53	+1.18
Turnout		99,380	91.18	+1.34
Two-party-preferred result
Labor	Linda Burney	53,418	59.41	+1.11
Liberal	Pramej Shrestha	36,489	40.59	−1.11
Labor hold		Swing	+1.11	

==== 2016 ====
2016 Australian federal election: Barton
Party	Candidate	Votes	%	±%
Labor	Linda Burney	41,878	47.75	+4.14
Liberal	Nickolas Varvaris	31,038	35.39	−2.88
Greens	Brent Heber	7,741	8.83	+0.95
Christian Democrats	Sonny Susilo	3,714	4.23	+2.16
Independent	Rasmus Torkel	2,236	2.55	+2.55
Online Direct Democracy	Harry Tsoukalas	1,095	1.25	+1.25
Total formal votes		87,702	91.65	+3.56
Informal votes		7,991	8.35	−3.56
Turnout		95,693	89.84	−2.77
Two-party-preferred result
Labor	Linda Burney	51,131	58.30	+3.91
Liberal	Nickolas Varvaris	36,571	41.70	−3.91
Labor notional hold		Swing	+3.91	

==== 2013 ====
2013 Australian federal election: Barton
Party	Candidate	Votes	%	±%
Liberal	Nickolas Varvaris	33,881	42.35	+1.68
Labor	Steve McMahon	32,345	40.43	−8.05
Greens	Jackie Brooker	4,788	5.98	−4.87
Palmer United	Edward Caruana	3,114	3.89	+3.89
Independent	Michael Nagi	3,071	3.84	+3.84
Christian Democrats	Kylie French	1,549	1.94	+1.94
One Nation	Perry Theo	686	0.86	+0.86
Katter's Australian	Rodney Wyse	567	0.71	+0.71
Total formal votes		80,001	87.96	−2.22
Informal votes		10,948	12.04	+2.22
Turnout		90,949	92.16	+0.54
Two-party-preferred result
Liberal	Nickolas Varvaris	40,245	50.31	+7.17
Labor	Steve McMahon	39,756	49.69	−7.17
Liberal gain from Labor		Swing	+7.17	

==== 2010 ====
2010 Australian federal election: Barton
Party	Candidate	Votes	%	±%
Labor	Robert McClelland	38,149	48.48	−8.80
Liberal	John La Mela	31,998	40.67	+9.76
Greens	Simone Francis	8,536	10.85	+2.61
Total formal votes		78,683	90.18	−3.25
Informal votes		8,572	9.82	+3.25
Turnout		87,255	91.61	−3.44
Two-party-preferred result
Labor	Robert McClelland	44,742	56.86	−8.08
Liberal	John La Mela	33,941	43.14	+8.08
Labor hold		Swing	−8.08	

=== Elections in the 2000s ===
==== 2007 ====
2007 Australian federal election: Barton
Party	Candidate	Votes	%	±%
Labor	Robert McClelland	45,292	55.26	+5.61
Liberal	John La Mela	27,425	33.46	−5.94
Greens	Michele McKenzie	6,784	8.28	+1.34
Christian Democrats	Chris Svolos	2,465	3.01	+3.01
Total formal votes		81,966	94.44	+1.43
Informal votes		4,829	5.56	−1.43
Turnout		86,795	94.97	+1.10
Two-party-preferred result
Labor	Robert McClelland	50,902	62.10	+4.53
Liberal	John La Mela	31,064	37.90	−4.53
Labor hold		Swing	+4.53	

==== 2004 ====
2004 Australian federal election: Barton
Party	Candidate	Votes	%	±%
Labor	Robert McClelland	36,909	49.66	+1.67
Liberal	Bruce Morrow	29,319	39.44	+1.71
Greens	Angelo Mourikis	5,169	6.95	+4.05
Democrats	Eoin Coghlan	1,648	2.22	−2.23
One Nation	Neil Baird	1,284	1.73	−1.92
Total formal votes		74,329	93.04	−0.37
Informal votes		5,563	6.96	+0.37
Turnout		79,892	94.44	+0.02
Two-party-preferred result
Labor	Robert McClelland	42,772	57.54	+1.52
Liberal	Bruce Morrow	31,557	42.46	−1.52
Labor hold		Swing	+1.52	

==== 2001 ====
2001 Australian federal election: Barton
Party	Candidate	Votes	%	±%
Labor	Robert McClelland	35,871	47.99	−1.71
Liberal	Jan Brennan	28,198	37.73	+2.76
Democrats	Michele Adair	3,328	4.45	+1.74
One Nation	David Rydstrand	2,725	3.65	−3.18
Greens	Chris Harris	2,168	2.90	+1.35
Unity	John Lau	1,375	1.84	−2.40
Christian Democrats	David Barker	1,081	1.45	+1.43
Total formal votes		74,746	93.41	−2.30
Informal votes		5,277	6.59	+2.30
Turnout		80,023	94.89	
Two-party-preferred result
Labor	Robert McClelland	41,873	56.02	−3.77
Liberal	Jan Brennan	32,873	43.98	+3.77
Labor hold		Swing	−3.77	

=== Elections in the 1990s ===
==== 1998 ====
1998 Australian federal election: Barton
Party	Candidate	Votes	%	±%
Labor	Robert McClelland	37,382	49.61	+1.23
Liberal	James Jordan	26,430	35.08	−6.09
One Nation	Neil Baird	5,162	6.85	+6.85
Unity	Lin Tang	3,182	4.22	+4.22
Democrats	Craig Chung	2,028	2.69	−2.73
Greens	Adam Nelson	1,161	1.54	+1.54
Total formal votes		75,345	95.73	+0.01
Informal votes		3,364	4.27	−0.01
Turnout		78,709	94.66	−1.15
Two-party-preferred result
Labor	Robert McClelland	45,029	59.76	+5.42
Liberal	James Jordan	30,316	40.24	−5.42
Labor hold		Swing	+5.42	

==== 1996 ====
1996 Australian federal election: Barton
Party	Candidate	Votes	%	±%
Labor	Robert McClelland	35,943	48.38	−7.54
Liberal	Arthur Santorinios	30,582	41.17	+3.29
Democrats	Craig Chung	4,026	5.42	+2.91
Call to Australia	Chris D McLean	2,381	3.20	+1.70
Independent	Safwan Nasser	1,359	1.83	+1.83
Total formal votes		74,291	95.71	−0.25
Informal votes		3,328	4.29	+0.25
Turnout		77,619	96.81	+0.50
Two-party-preferred result
Labor	Robert McClelland	40,250	54.34	−5.05
Liberal	Arthur Santorinios	33,817	45.66	+5.05
Labor hold		Swing	−5.05	

==== 1993 ====
1993 Australian federal election: Barton
Party	Candidate	Votes	%	±%
Labor	Gary Punch	41,442	55.92	+9.17
Liberal	Phil White	28,066	37.87	−1.99
Democrats	Troy Anderson	1,862	2.51	−5.24
Call to Australia	Cathy Mudie	1,118	1.51	+0.39
Independent	Norm McGarry	545	0.74	+0.74
Independent	Ross Green	425	0.57	+0.57
Independent	Paul Balding	365	0.49	+0.49
Natural Law	Dafna O'Neill	285	0.38	+0.38
Total formal votes		74,108	95.96	−0.19
Informal votes		3,118	4.04	+0.19
Turnout		77,226	96.31	
Two-party-preferred result
Labor	Gary Punch	43,994	59.39	+4.57
Liberal	Phil White	30,077	40.61	−4.57
Labor hold		Swing	+4.57	

==== 1990 ====
1990 Australian federal election: Barton
Party	Candidate	Votes	%	±%
Labor	Gary Punch	29,530	45.1	−3.4
Liberal	David Macauley	27,238	41.6	−3.4
Democrats	Ron George	4,840	7.4	+7.4
Call to Australia	Cathy Mudie	968	1.5	+1.5
Independent	Max Lindon	941	1.4	+1.4
Grey Power	Noel Said	827	1.3	+1.3
Independent	Joe Hardy	808	1.2	+1.2
Democratic Socialist	Rosemary McCann	397	0.6	+0.6
Total formal votes		65,549	96.6	
Informal votes		2,289	3.4	
Turnout		67,838	95.9	
Two-party-preferred result
Labor	Gary Punch	34,752	53.1	+2.1
Liberal	David Macauley	30,640	46.9	−2.1
Labor hold		Swing	+2.1	

=== Elections in the 1980s ===
==== 1987 ====
1987 Australian federal election: Barton
Party	Candidate	Votes	%	±%
Labor	Gary Punch	31,773	48.5	+0.0
Liberal	Bob Gemmell	29,473	45.0	+0.0
Independent	Jim McLean	3,724	5.7	+5.7
Independent	Charles Bellchambers	600	0.9	+0.9
Total formal votes		65,570	96.2	
Informal votes		2,598	3.8	
Turnout		68,168	94.2	
Two-party-preferred result
Labor	Gary Punch	33,463	51.0	−0.2
Liberal	Bob Gemmell	32,097	49.0	+0.2
Labor hold		Swing	−0.2	

==== 1984 ====
1984 Australian federal election: Barton
Party	Candidate	Votes	%	±%
Labor	Gary Punch	31,431	48.5	+1.4
Liberal	Jim Bradfield	29,199	45.0	+1.0
Democrats	Ron George	4,209	6.5	+3.6
Total formal votes		64,839	93.9	
Informal votes		4,233	6.1	
Turnout		69,072	94.7	
Two-party-preferred result
Labor	Gary Punch	33,197	51.2	−0.2
Liberal	Jim Bradfield	31,635	48.8	+0.2
Labor hold		Swing	−0.2	

==== 1983 ====
1983 Australian federal election: Barton
Party	Candidate	Votes	%	±%
Labor	Gary Punch	31,308	49.7	+2.6
Liberal	Jim Bradfield	26,086	41.4	−5.0
Independent	Bruce Barton	3,153	5.0	+5.0
Democrats	Ronald George	1,812	2.9	−0.9
Independent	Jean Lindsay	284	0.5	+0.5
Progress	Peter Wright	172	0.3	+0.3
Independent	Charles Bellchambers	166	0.3	−2.4
Total formal votes		62,981	97.7	
Informal votes		1,478	2.3	
Turnout		64,459	95.6	
Two-party-preferred result
Labor	Gary Punch	32,845	52.15	+2.55
Liberal	Jim Bradfield	30,136	47.85	−2.55
Labor gain from Liberal		Swing	+2.55	

==== 1980 ====
1980 Australian federal election: Barton
Party	Candidate	Votes	%	±%
Labor	Rodney Madgwick	30,602	47.1	+6.1
Liberal	Jim Bradfield	30,152	46.4	−2.0
Democrats	Beverley Eley	2,464	3.8	−4.7
Independent	Charles Bellchambers	1,749	2.7	+0.6
Total formal votes		64,967	98.0	
Informal votes		1,299	2.0	
Turnout		66,266	94.9	
Two-party-preferred result
Liberal	Jim Bradfield	32,739	50.4	−3.6
Labor	Rodney Madgwick	32,228	49.6	+3.6
Liberal hold		Swing	−3.6	

=== Elections in the 1970s ===
==== 1977 ====
1977 Australian federal election: Barton
Party	Candidate	Votes	%	±%
Liberal	Jim Bradfield	32,128	48.4	−4.1
Labor	Ron Cunningham	27,204	41.0	−4.1
Democrats	Phil White	5,650	8.5	+8.5
Independent	Charles Bellchambers	1,404	2.1	+2.1
Total formal votes		66,386	98.0	
Informal votes		1,322	2.0	
Turnout		67,708	95.7	
Two-party-preferred result
Liberal	Jim Bradfield	36,842	54.0	+0.1
Labor	Ron Cunningham	30,544	46.0	−0.1
Liberal hold		Swing	+0.1	

==== 1975 ====
1975 Australian federal election: Barton
Party	Candidate	Votes	%	±%
Liberal	Jim Bradfield	34,209	53.5	+9.5
Labor	Murray Gainsford	28,179	44.1	−9.6
Workers	Maxwell Shean	868	1.4	−0.9
Australia	Clifford Willard	706	1.1	−1.2
Total formal votes		63,962	98.7	
Informal votes		872	1.3	
Turnout		64,834	96.0	
Two-party-preferred result
Liberal	Jim Bradfield		54.9	+10.0
Labor	Murray Gainsford		45.1	−10.0
Liberal gain from Labor		Swing	+10.0	

==== 1974 ====
1974 Australian federal election: Barton
Party	Candidate	Votes	%	±%
Labor	Len Reynolds	32,694	53.7	+0.9
Liberal	Jim Bradfield	26,771	44.0	+2.9
Australia	Charles Margetson	1,397	2.3	−1.7
Total formal votes		60,862	98.8	
Informal votes		711	1.2	
Turnout		61,573	96.1	
Two-party-preferred result
Labor	Len Reynolds		55.1	−0.7
Liberal	Jim Bradfield		44.9	+0.7
Labor hold		Swing	−0.7	

==== 1972 ====
1972 Australian federal election: Barton
Party	Candidate	Votes	%	±%
Labor	Len Reynolds	29,931	52.8	+2.3
Liberal	Vince Bruce	23,306	41.1	−2.0
Australia	Rhonda Howse	2,255	4.0	+4.0
Democratic Labor	Bruce Stafford	877	1.5	−0.7
Independent	Brian Howard	348	0.6	+0.6
Total formal votes		56,717	98.5	
Informal votes		860	1.5	
Turnout		57,577	96.4	
Two-party-preferred result
Labor	Len Reynolds		55.8	+2.8
Liberal	Vince Bruce		44.2	−2.8
Labor hold		Swing	+2.8	

=== Elections in the 1960s ===
==== 1969 ====
1969 Australian federal election: Barton
Party	Candidate	Votes	%	±%
Labor	Len Reynolds	27,628	50.5	+4.1
Liberal	Bill Arthur	23,576	43.1	−7.0
Independent	Alan Reed	1,885	3.4	+3.4
Democratic Labor	Charles Chapman	1,220	2.2	−0.5
Independent	Charles Bellchambers	214	0.4	−0.4
Independent	Ray Emmerson	171	0.3	+0.3
Total formal votes		54,694	98.2	
Informal votes		1,001	1.8	
Turnout		55,695	96.3	
Two-party-preferred result
Labor	Len Reynolds		53.0	+5.7
Liberal	Bill Arthur		47.0	−5.7
Labor gain from Liberal		Swing	+5.7	

==== 1966 ====
1966 Australian federal election: Barton
Party	Candidate	Votes	%	±%
Liberal	Bill Arthur	23,089	49.6	+2.9
Labor	Len Reynolds	21,818	46.9	−3.1
Democratic Labor	Phillip Kennedy	1,252	2.7	−0.6
Independent	Charles Bellchambers	371	0.8	+0.8
Total formal votes		46,530	97.5	
Informal votes		1,188	2.5	
Turnout		47,718	96.4	
Two-party-preferred result
Liberal	Bill Arthur	24,289	52.2	+2.9
Labor	Len Reynolds	22,241	47.8	−2.9
Liberal gain from Labor		Swing	+4.6	

==== 1963 ====
1963 Australian federal election: Barton
Party	Candidate	Votes	%	±%
Labor	Len Reynolds	22,889	50.0	−7.2
Liberal	Jack Manning	21,394	46.7	+9.2
Democratic Labor	Norma Boyle	1,508	3.3	−2.0
Total formal votes		45,791	98.9	
Informal votes		511	1.1	
Turnout		46,302	96.7	
Two-party-preferred result
Labor	Len Reynolds	23,201	50.7	−8.4
Liberal	Jack Manning	22,590	49.3	+8.4
Labor hold		Swing	−8.4	

==== 1961 ====
1961 Australian federal election: Barton
Party	Candidate	Votes	%	±%
Labor	Len Reynolds	25,447	57.2	+7.9
Liberal	Colin Sullivan	16,672	37.5	−9.8
Democratic Labor	Thomas Bresnan	2,368	5.3	+1.9
Total formal votes		44,487	97.9	
Informal votes		958	2.1	
Turnout		45,445	95.9	
Two-party-preferred result
Labor	Len Reynolds		59.1	+8.8
Liberal	Colin Sullivan		40.9	−8.8
Labor hold		Swing	+8.8	

=== Elections in the 1950s ===
==== 1958 ====
1958 Australian federal election: Barton
Party	Candidate	Votes	%	±%
Labor	Len Reynolds	21,213	49.3	+0.1
Liberal	Bill Arthur	20,345	47.3	+0.4
Democratic Labor	Reginald Lawson	1,454	3.4	+3.4
Total formal votes		43,012	97.6	
Informal votes		1,066	2.4	
Turnout		44,078	96.4	
Two-party-preferred result
Labor	Len Reynolds	21,638	50.3	+0.0
Liberal	Bill Arthur	21,374	49.7	+0.0
Labor hold		Swing	+0.0	

==== 1955 ====
1955 Australian federal election: Barton
Party	Candidate	Votes	%	±%
Labor	Herbert Evatt	20,896	49.2	−4.4
Liberal	Bill Arthur	19,903	46.9	+0.5
Independent	Eric Trembath	1,655	3.9	+3.9
Total formal votes		42,454	98.2	
Informal votes		796	1.8	
Turnout		43,250	96.6	
Two-party-preferred result
Labor	Herbert Evatt	21,340	50.3	−3.3
Liberal	Bill Arthur	21,114	49.7	+3.3
Labor hold		Swing	−3.3	

==== 1954 ====
1954 Australian federal election: Barton
Party	Candidate	Votes	%	±%
Labor	Herbert Evatt	23,303	54.7	+4.4
Liberal	Bill Arthur	19,260	45.3	−4.4
Total formal votes		42,563	99.0	
Informal votes		435	1.0	
Turnout		42,998	96.8	
Labor hold		Swing	+4.4	

==== 1951 ====
1951 Australian federal election: Barton
Party	Candidate	Votes	%	±%
Labor	Herbert Evatt	20,949	50.3	−2.9
Liberal	Nancy Wake	20,706	49.7	+2.9
Total formal votes		41,655	98.6	
Informal votes		580	1.4	
Turnout		42,235	97.4	
Labor hold		Swing	−2.9	

=== Elections in the 1940s ===
==== 1949 ====
1949 Australian federal election: Barton
Party	Candidate	Votes	%	±%
Labor	Herbert Evatt	21,681	53.2	−13.0
Liberal	Nancy Wake	19,037	46.8	+13.0
Total formal votes		40,718	98.4	
Informal votes		653	1.6	
Turnout		41,371	98.0	
Labor hold		Swing	−13.0	

==== 1946 ====
1946 Australian federal election: Barton
Party	Candidate	Votes	%	±%
Labor	Herbert Evatt	48,740	66.9	−7.3
Liberal	George Hohnen	24,064	33.1	+10.1
Total formal votes		72,804	98.1	
Informal votes		1,389	1.9	
Turnout		74,193	96.8	
Labor hold		Swing	−8.7	

==== 1943 ====
1943 Australian federal election: Barton
Party	Candidate	Votes	%	±%
Labor	Herbert Evatt	51,296	74.2	+16.8
United Australia	Frank Browne	15,897	23.0	−12.4
Protestant People	Thomas Claydon	1,936	2.8	+2.8
Total formal votes		69,129	98.3	
Informal votes		1,179	1.7	
Turnout		70,308	99.3	
Two-party-preferred result
Labor	Herbert Evatt		75.6	+13.5
United Australia	Frank Browne		24.4	−13.5
Labor hold		Swing	+13.5	

==== 1940 ====
1940 Australian federal election: Barton
Party	Candidate	Votes	%	±%
Labor	Herbert Evatt	35,425	57.4	+16.4
United Australia	Albert Lane	21,845	35.4	−13.9
Labor (N-C)	John Rose	2,643	4.3	+4.3
State Labor	Sam Lewis	1,111	1.8	+1.8
Independent	John Mackay	484	0.8	+0.8
Defence Movement	Robert Mackie	155	0.3	+0.3
Total formal votes		61,663	97.6	
Informal votes		1,539	2.4	
Turnout		63,202	96.8	
Two-party-preferred result
Labor	Herbert Evatt		62.1	+13.9
United Australia	Albert Lane		37.9	−13.9
Labor gain from United Australia		Swing	+13.9	

=== Elections in the 1930s ===
==== 1937 ====
1937 Australian federal election: Barton
Party	Candidate	Votes	%	±%
United Australia	Albert Lane	28,342	49.3	+2.9
Labor	John Donovan	23,539	41.0	+41.0
Social Credit	Stanley Allen	5,562	9.7	−1.4
Total formal votes		57,443	97.9	
Informal votes		1,254	2.1	
Turnout		58,697	98.0	
Two-party-preferred result
United Australia	Albert Lane	29,780	51.8	+0.4
Labor	John Donovan	27,663	48.2	−0.4
United Australia hold		Swing	+0.4	

==== 1934 ====
1934 Australian federal election: Barton
Party	Candidate	Votes	%	±%
United Australia	Albert Lane	24,344	46.4	−1.3
Labor (NSW)	John Eldridge	18,450	35.1	+1.7
Social Credit	John Macara	5,824	11.1	+11.1
Labor	Albert Willis	2,499	4.8	−14.2
Communist	Pat Drew	1,405	2.7	+2.7
Total formal votes		52,522	96.3	
Informal votes		2,024	3.7	
Turnout		54,546	98.1	
Two-party-preferred result
United Australia	Albert Lane	27,014	51.4	−2.6
Labor (NSW)	John Eldridge	25,508	48.6	+2.6
United Australia hold		Swing	−2.6	

==== 1931 ====
1931 Australian federal election: Barton
Party	Candidate	Votes	%	±%
United Australia	Albert Lane	31,226	46.8	+14.4
Labor (NSW)	John Eldridge	22,669	33.9	+33.9
Labor	James Tully	12,877	19.3	−48.4
Total formal votes		66,772	97.5	
Informal votes		1,697	2.5	
Turnout		68,469	97.0	
Two-party-preferred result
United Australia	Albert Lane	35,538	53.2	+20.8
Labor (NSW)	John Eldridge	31,234	46.8	−20.8
United Australia gain from Labor		Swing	+20.8	

=== Elections in the 1920s ===
==== 1929 ====
1929 Australian federal election: Barton
Party	Candidate	Votes	%	±%
Labor	James Tully	43,207	67.6	+11.3
Nationalist	William Myhill	20,722	32.4	−11.3
Total formal votes		63,929	97.5	
Informal votes		1,596	2.5	
Turnout		65,535	97.3	
Labor hold		Swing	+11.3	

==== 1928 ====
1928 Australian federal election: Barton
Party	Candidate	Votes	%	±%
Labor	James Tully	32,316	56.3	+7.3
Nationalist	Thomas Ley	25,070	43.7	−7.3
Total formal votes		57,386	95.4	
Informal votes		2,768	4.6	
Turnout		60,154	96.7	
Labor gain from Nationalist		Swing	+7.3	

==== 1925 ====
1925 Australian federal election: Barton
Party	Candidate	Votes	%	±%
Nationalist	Thomas Ley	26,172	51.0	+8.6
Labor	Frederick McDonald	25,112	49.0	−8.6
Total formal votes		51,284	98.8	
Informal votes		632	1.2	
Turnout		51,916	95.4	
Nationalist gain from Labor		Swing	+8.6	

==== 1922 ====
1922 Australian federal election: Barton
Party	Candidate	Votes	%	±%
Labor	Frederick McDonald	13,349	57.6	+16.3
Nationalist	Hector Lamond	9,828	42.4	−11.3
Total formal votes		23,177	96.2	
Informal votes		914	3.8	
Turnout		24,091	56.8	
Labor notional gain from Nationalist		Swing	+13.8	
