= Blakehurst High School =

Location
- Blakehurst, New South Wales; Australia; 33°58′51″S 151°6′48″E

Information
- Type: Government-funded co-educational comprehensive and specialist secondary day school
- Motto: Latin: Nihil Sine Labore (Nothing without work)
- Established: 1960; 66 years ago
- Educational authority: New South Wales Department of Education
- Oversight: NSW Education Standards Authority
- Specialist: Languages
- Principal: Sophie Kapsimalis
- Staff: 110
- Teaching staff: 77.6 FTE (2018)
- Years: 7–12
- Enrolment: 1,113 (2018)
- Campus type: Suburban
- Website: blakehurst-h.schools.nsw.gov.au

Blakehurst High School is a Government-funded co-educational comprehensive and specialist secondary day school with speciality in languages, located in Blakehurst, a southern suburb of Sydney, New South Wales, Australia.

Established in 1960, the school enrolled approximately 1,110 students in 2018, from Year 7 to Year 12, of whom one percent identified as Indigenous Australians and 85 percent were from a language background other than English. The school is operated by the NSW Department of Education in accordance with a curriculum developed by the New South Wales Education Standards Authority; the principal is Kylie Rytmeister.

== Student composition ==
As of 2016, the school has around 1138 students, 80 teaching staff and 30 non-teaching staff. 40% of the students are from an Anglo-Celtic background and 81.8% of students identify as having a non-English speaking background, many of whom were born in Australia. Of these students, the largest group is of Chinese background, 30% of the school population, and the second largest is Greek at 10%. Of the remaining 60%, there are over 40 language groups represented, including one Egyptian and one Mexican.

In 2000 the school was award the title Specialist Languages High School as part of the Outstanding Schools Program.

== International influence ==
Blakehurst high school has an International students program, and enrol approximately 60 international students each year.

The school has an exchange student program with a partner high school in Japan.

== Notable alumni ==
- Justice Robert McClelland – Judge of the Family Court of Australia, former politician who served as the Attorney-General of Australia and Member for Barton.

== Notable former teaching staff ==
- Barry Collier – former politician, Member for Miranda (1999–2011 & 2013–2015), social science teacher, 1982 to 1986.

== See also ==
- List of government schools in New South Wales (A-B)
- Education in Australia
