= 2007 New South Wales state election campaign =

2007 New South Wales state election
- 24 March 2007

All 93 seats in the New South Wales Legislative Assembly and 21 (of the 42) seats in the New South Wales Legislative Council 47 Assembly seats were needed for a majority
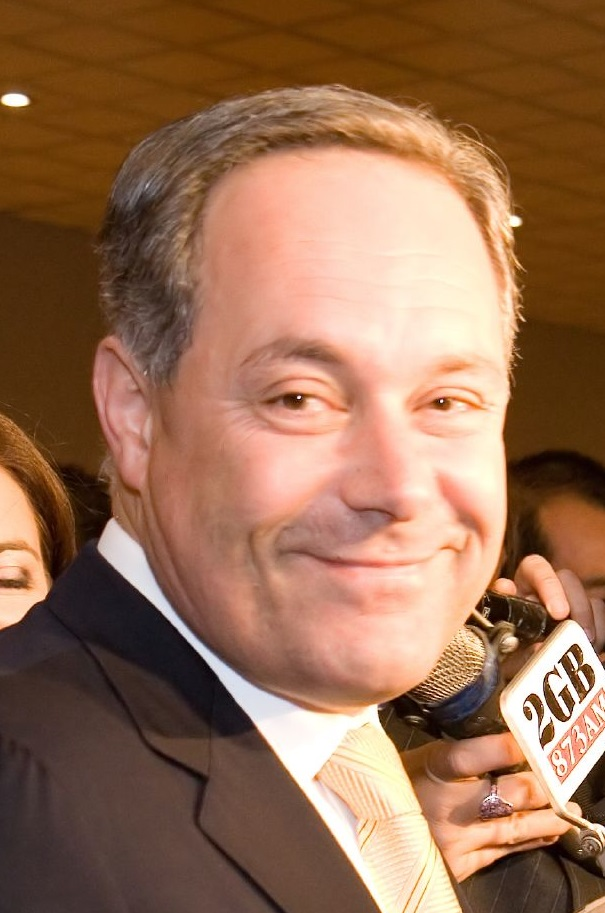

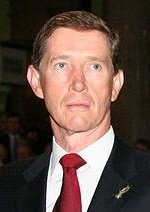
	First party	Second party
Leader	Morris Iemma	Peter Debnam
Party	Labor	Liberal/National coalition
Leader since	3 August 2005	1 September 2005
Leader's seat	Lakemba	Vaucluse
Last election	55 seats	32 seats
Seats before	53 seats	30 seats
Seats won	52 seats	35 seats
Seat change	▼1	▲5
Popular vote	1,535,872	1,457,296
Percentage	38.87%	36.99%
Swing	▼3.81	▲2.64
TPP	52.26%	47.74%
TPP swing	▼3.92	▲3.92
- Two-candidate-preferred margin by electorate
Premier before election
Morris Iemma
Labor
Elected Premier
Morris Iemma
Labor

An election campaign was held ahead of a general election for the 54th Parliament of New South Wales on Saturday, 24 March 2007. The result—a win for the social-democratic Labor Party and its new leader Morris Iemma—was widely perceived as a foregone conclusion, with opposition leader Peter Debnam conceding as much the week before the poll.

Though water and infrastructure emerged as key issues in the campaign, much of the parties' advertising focussed on the negatives: Debnam's business record and Labor's record in office. The media concluded that the choice facing voters was in finding the lesser of two evils: the three major newspapers sold in New South Wales endorsed Debnam, though not without criticising his ineptitude on the campaign trail.

== Leaders ==
=== Labor ===
Labor leader Morris Iemma, a former union official, had represented Labor in the Legislative Assembly since 1991. Labor won office at the 1995 election, and Iemma became a parliamentary secretary. From 1999, he held several portfolios, culminating in two years in the challenging role of Health minister. With the surprise resignation of Premier Bob Carr in 2005, Iemma was elected unopposed as his replacement.

Iemma maintained Labor's opinion poll lead, despite losing some of the government's most experienced ministers along with Carr himself. In 2005 and 2006, Iemma's government was hit by a series of scandals, such as the arrest of Aboriginal Affairs minister Milton Orkopoulos and the financial collapse of the controversial Cross City Tunnel. These and other incidents brought Iemma's political judgment into question.

One of Iemma's major achievements was to announce the New South Wales State Plan, a ten-year blueprint for infrastructure development, law reform and social policy.

During the campaign, opposition attack ads focussed more on Iemma's least popular ministers, Joe Tripodi, Michael Costa and Frank Sartor rather than the premier himself. Towards the end of the campaign, there was some discussion of Iemma's relationship with his former boss, Labor identity Graham Richardson, who stood accused of tax avoidance at the time.

=== Coalition ===
Peter Debnam, a former naval officer and businessman, was elected to represent the seat of Vaucluse for the Liberals in 1994. Debnam served as a shadow minister under a succession of opposition leaders. Following John Brogden's sudden resignation as Liberal Leader, Barry O'Farrell, as Deputy Leader, was initially the favourite to become leader, but Debnam steadily gained ground as he lobbied Liberal MPs, and on 31 August O'Farrell withdrew from the contest.

Between his appointment and the election, Debnam never quite shook the perception that under Brogden or O'Farrell, the party would have performed much better. This perception was reinforced when, in a bid to capitalise on the Orkopoulos scandal, the opposition leader raised unsubstantiated allegations against Attorney-General Bob Debus in 2006.

During the campaign, Labor attacked Debnam's record as a businessman and his plans to cut the size of the public service. The Labor campaign also made a point of referring to the opposition leader as "the member for Vaucluse." Vaucluse, New South Wales is one of Sydney's most exclusive suburbs.

== Issues ==
=== Water ===
Concern over climate change and drought conditions were widespread in Australia in early 2007, with federal and state policymakers promising action. As the state election campaign got underway, Iemma was first among state leaders to endorse Prime Minister John Howard's plan for the federal government to take a greater role in managing the Murray-Darling river system.

Metropolitan water supplies were also a big issue, with dams supplying the city of Sydney falling to 30% of their design capacity during the campaign. Iemma's predecessor Bob Carr had committed Labor to building a desalination plant at Kurnell in Sydney's south. Iemma made the controversial $1.9 billion project the centrepiece of his party's response to the city's dwindling water supply. A dam was also planned to boost water supplies on the state's Central Coast.

The Liberals rejected the desalination plant as unacceptable to residents, energy inefficient and harmful to the environment. Debnam championed the use of water recycling to supplement the dams. Other Coalition commitments included an increase of the water tank rebate to $1500, upgrades to country and coastal towns' water supply infrastructure and a regional water grid to share rural water supplies.

Much of the Coalition's infrastructure promises were to be financed by the privatisation of New South Wales Lotteries, a state-owned enterprise reckoned to have a market value of around $800 million.

=== Economy ===
The state's economy is also an issue. Despite more than a decade of uninterrupted economic growth at a national level, New South Wales has begun to lag the other states in both jobs and growth figures.

Fears of the state slipping into recession—the New South Wales economy shrank in the September quarter—were allayed after the state recorded positive growth in the December quarter. New South Wales did, however, continue to lag the other mainland states on economic growth.

=== Public sector ===
The size and efficiency of the New South Wales public sector was a campaign issue. Significant wage growth had made New South Wales public servants the most expensive to employ, and although there were calls for more police, there was also wide agreement that the size of the bureaucracy needed to be reduced. Debnam characterised the size and expense of the public service as "out of control" and promised productivity improvements.

The Liberals announced that they would cut 20,000 administrative positions from the public sector through natural attrition. Labor made this promise a particular focus for their advertising campaign, warning that such deep cuts would compromise service delivery: the advertising implied that the Liberals planned to sack teachers, nurses and police.

Labor planned a cut of 5,000, although Treasurer Michael Costa was quoted in March 2005 as telling the Public Sector Union that as many as 20% of the state's public servants were surplus to requirements.

The Liberals also committed themselves to privatising two state-owned enterprises, gambling operator New South Wales Lotteries and garbage company WSN Environmental Solutions.

=== Industrial relations ===
Iemma has accused the Liberals of planning to refer the state's industrial relations powers to the Australian Government, whose WorkChoices legislation remains controversial. Although most New South Wales workers are now covered by the WorkChoices system, public servants are not. A lobby group representing nurses ran television commercials attacking the Liberals on this point. This was despite Debnam guaranteeing industrial relations for all New South Wales public servants would remain under the control of the New South Wales government.

=== Infrastructure ===
The government is vulnerable on the issue of infrastructure. Although water infrastructure has taken centre stage in the campaign; interruptions to the electricity supply, poor service levels on ferries and trains, and controversies surrounding major road projects have taken their toll on the government's image.

A significant point of difference between Labor and the Coalition concerns the long-planned Southern Freeway, which would link the F6 Freeway at Waterfall with Southern Cross Drive or the M5 South Western Motorway near Sydney Airport. The link would improve travel times between the capital and Wollongong, the state's third city, but the corridor is currently public open space, and construction would be controversial. Labor opposes building the motorway, the Liberals support it.

The Liberals are also pushing a significant expansion of the city's light rail network, which Labor opposed. The Liberals were criticised for not putting forward a comprehensive plan for public transport at the election. The party claimed that it did not have access to sufficient information to make meaningful commitments in this area.

The Coalition was particularly critical of the pace at which the Pacific Highway was being upgraded, as well as the controversy surrounding the Cross City Tunnel.

Both Labor and the Coalition pledged to clear the backlog in public school maintenance that had developed since 2000.

=== Immigration ===
During the election the Christian Democratic Party (Australia) called for a moratorium on Muslim immigration to Australia, seeking to replace them with "persecuted Christians from the Middle East." Nile said the moratorium should be in place to allow a study of the effects of Muslim migration. "There has been no serious study of the potential effects upon Australia of more than 300,000 Muslims who are already here," he said. "Australians deserve a breathing space so the situation can be carefully assessed before Islamic immigration can be allowed to resume. In the meantime, Australia should extend a welcoming hand to many thousands of persecuted Christians who are presently displaced or at risk in the Middle East." Nile and another CDP candidate Allan Lotfizadeh reported receiving death threats on account of this announcement.

Fred Nile was re-elected to the New South Wales Legislative Council on 24 March 2007, achieving a vote of 4.4%. This was the highest vote for the CDP since 1988.

== Campaigns ==
Labor outspent their opponents, buying $7 million worth of television, radio and print advertising against the Liberals' $3 million. Labor also benefited from the state government's substantial advertising spend, which totalled $10 million in 2006.

An opinion poll judging the effectiveness of the parties' campaigns suggested that Labor's advertising was much better than that used by the Liberals.

=== Let's fix NSW ===
In effect, the campaign's opening shot came in the form of Liberal print and television ads in response to scandals involving Labor MPs Steven Chaytor, Kerry Hickey, Milton Orkopoulos and Carl Scully. Without mentioning the scandals' specifics, the ads branded the government as "rotten to the core".

On 8 January 2007, Debnam launched "Get NSW back in front", a campaign emphasising the state's declining economic performance relative to the other states. The principal focus was economic growth underpinned by better infrastructure, lower taxes and less red tape for business. The Sydney Morning Herald quipped that "with the Coalition trailing in the polls, it may equally refer to the Opposition Leader's prospects."

On 25 February, Debnam and Prime Minister John Howard officially launched his party's campaign, under the slogan "Let's fix NSW". The focus was on water and transport infrastructure, an expansion in police numbers and improving the efficiency of the public sector. Liberal television advertising, however, made no mention of the party's policies: instead they attacked Treasurer Michael Costa's budget deficit, Roads Minister Joe Tripodi's role in the Cross City Tunnel controversy and Planning Minister Frank Sartor's approach to urban consolidation.

The National Party, the Liberals' junior coalition partner, ran on the slogan "It's over for Labor," focussing on infrastructure and health as key issues.

=== Heading in the right direction ===
Labor officially launched its campaign, "More to do but we're heading in the right direction," on 18 February. The launch event was low key; state ministers and former premiers Neville Wran and Bob Carr for instance were not invited.

The slogan attracted derision from across the news media. A number of reporters demanded - without success - to know who came up with it.

The opposition claimed that the incumbents' strategy was to disassociate themselves from their first 10 years in office, noting the use of phrases like "more to do" and the strong focus on Iemma's, rather than the party's, branding. "Morris Iemma's trying to pretend that he's Rip Van Winkel," deputy Liberal leader Barry O'Farrell said. "That he woke up and found himself in government 18 months ago - the public don't buy it."

Some of Labor's television campaign had Iemma explaining aspects of his policies, the remainder attacked Debnam's business career and industrial relations policies.

Labor also benefited from extensive government-funded advertising in the months before the election. Television ads for the New South Wales State Plan, the Metropolitan Water Strategy and other government policies and plans were criticised by the opposition and media as ALP propaganda.

== Campaign Trail ==
With the state's system of fixed parliamentary terms, the election date was known long in advance, denying the incumbents the opportunity to set the election date. This has the effect of lengthening the campaign season beyond the customary one month. The opening shots of the election campaign came in November 2006 as the Iemma government found itself mired in a series of ministerial scandals.

=== Something is rotten ===
Over the course of two weeks, Labor lost two ministers to scandal. First, Police Minister Carl Scully was dumped from the front bench after being caught misleading parliament over a report into the 2005 Cronulla riots. Scully was one of the government's most experienced ministers and the loss was considered significant. Within a fortnight, however, the government was rocked by 7 November arrest, on child-sex and drug charges, of Aboriginal Affairs Minister Milton Orkopoulos.

At the same time, lesser scandals tarnished Local Government Minister Kerry Hickey, and candidates Phil Koperberg and Aaron Beasley. This, coupled with an announcement by Attorney-General Bob Debus that he would be leaving state politics, gave the impression of a Labor government in disarray. The following month, backbencher Steven Chaytor revealed that he had been charged with assaulting his girlfriend. An Independent Commission Against Corruption investigation was launched into MPs Cherie Burton and John Aquilina after a Burton staffer was found to have embezzled government funds.

The opposition, which according to polls had failed to make headway against Iemma thus far, seized its opportunity. On 13 November the Liberals launched newspaper and television ads asserting that "when politicians are more interested in protecting their own careers, while the state crumbles around them, you know that something is rotten to its very core there's no choice but to get rid of it."

It was not long before the Liberals' campaign against ruling-party sleaze faltered. On 16 November, Debnam suggested in parliament that Debus was under investigation by the Police Integrity Commission. In response the Government released a police report stating that a minister had been the subject of complaints (not an investigation) which were dismissed in 2003 as spurious and groundless. The report did not name the minister concerned as it was deemed to be 'not in the public interest'. Debnam's attack backfired spectacularly, throwing the spotlight on his judgement and not Iemma's.

=== A new direction for New South Wales ===
Signalling that the campaign was underway, Labor counterattacked with the release of its New South Wales State Plan ("A new direction for New South Wales") on 14 November. The document, developed with extensive community consultation and containing a number of big-ticket infrastructure projects was heavily promoted across web, print and broadcast media. At $10 million, the State Plan cost more to promote than it did to develop. Debnam labelled the campaign "an outrageous waste of taxpayer funds" and demanded that the Labor party pay for it.

With the ministerial scandals neutralised and the State Plan launched, one of Labor's few remaining worries for the election was the completion of the new Lane Cove Tunnel. Labor feared that the tunnel could prove every bit as problematic as the controversial Cross City Tunnel. At issue in both projects were changes to existing surface roads designed to funnel traffic into the new motorways.

When the tunnel operators, Connector Motorways, announced that the project would open ahead of schedule and before the election, the government negotiated a delay to the planned surface changes. Connector was paid $25 million in compensation, a payment The Sydney Morning Herald described as a "bribe". "The use of public funds to compensate Connector Motorways for delays to road changes around the tunnel is ... as cynical a piece of political jobbery as Sydney has seen in many a long year," the newspaper wrote.

Connector later announced it was deferring the tunnel opening until the day after the election.

=== Costa, Tripodi, Sartor ===
With polls suggesting that most voters liked Iemma personally, the Liberals zeroed in on the three government ministers thought to be least popular: Treasurer Michael Costa, Roads Minister Joe Tripodi and Planning Minister Frank Sartor.

Costa, on whose watch the New South Wales budget had slipped into deficit, faced the prospect of the state slipping into recession on the eve of the election. The treasurer attempted to blame central-bank independence for the state's poor performance, but the issue fell from view after the state economy registered weak growth in the final quarter of 2006 - enough to avert a technical recession.

Costa's record as treasurer wasn't the only problem: he reacted to the Liberals' campaign against himself, Tripodi and Sartor by claiming that the opposition was targeting "a bunch of people with Italian sounding names." The remark was widely dismissed as a gaffe, Costa played a low-key role in the campaign from that point on.

Tripodi, tainted by the Orange Grove affair, a 2000 sex scandal and the Cross City Tunnel controversy, was a significant electoral liability. On 10 February, the Sydney Morning Herald reported that former premier Bob Carr had been lobbying government MPs to stop planned reforms to marina development rules. Sources claimed that Carr was particularly critical of Waterways Minister Joe Tripodi. Tripodi was also singled out for criticism by independent MPs on 25 February, with the Sun-Herald reporting that the group would not support a minority Labor government if the controversial minister remained in cabinet.

On 21 February, Iemma was forced to apologise to Sydney commuters after thousands gathered in the CBD to watch the Queen Mary 2 and the Queen Elizabeth 2 dock in Sydney Harbour. Police and public transport officials were overwhelmed by the size of the response, which gridlocked roads, buses, trains and ferries.

On the Coalition side, it was the performance of Debnam as leader that was causing the most concern. Debnam drew criticism for outlining his vision for "practical multiculturalism" during a citizenship ceremony on 26 January, Australia Day. In an apparent echo of Don Brash's popular 2004 Orewa Speech, Debnam told the audience that multiculturalism had to become "a policy for inclusion, not separation". His use of the citizenship ceremony to make a campaign speech was criticised by his host, Sutherland Shire mayor David Redmond, as well as by Iemma.

Debnam failed to gain ground when, on 16 February, he met Iemma for the state's first-ever leaders debate, broadcast on the Australian Broadcasting Corporation's Stateline programme . Iemma rebuffed Debnam's repeated demands for a second debate.

But while Debnam struggled, his deputy, Barry O'Farrell and Nationals leader Andrew Stoner cemented their credentials as formidable media performers, the latter mounting an impassioned defence of the Liberal leader in the closing days of the campaign.

The Liberals suffered a more amusing distraction after details emerged of a lewd SMS Wyong candidate Brenton Pavier had sent to friends at Christmas. While he backed Debnam's decision to dump him, Pavier briefly considered running for Wyong as an independent.

=== 'The Labor Party is going to win the election' ===
As the last month of the campaign began, two polls showed that Labor had extended its lead over the Coalition and could even gain seats at the election. The Australian published Newspoll results that put Labor ahead on a two-party-preferred basis, 59% to 41%. The Sydney Morning Herald published ACNielsen results putting Labor ahead 57% to 43%. Three weeks later, polls indicated that Labor would be returned without losing any seats. On 16 March, Debnam took the unprecedented step of effectively conceding defeat, telling the press that "the message is very clear: the Labor Party is going to win the election in a week."

On 4 March, the Sun-Herald reported that the government had brokered a secret deal with publicans to increase the number of poker machines in the state's pubs. The large number of poker machines in New South Wales is controversial, and the alleged deal was condemned by the Greens and ClubsNSW. Pubs and clubs contributed $2 million to Labor's election campaign, and sales of currently unallocated poker machine licenses could net the treasury up to $200 million. The government and the Australian Hoteliers Association, representing publicans, denied a deal had been done.

A few days later, evidence emerged of Labor channelling financial and other assistance to independent campaigns across New South Wales. Labor stood accused of supporting independent candidates in Goulburn, Murrumbidgee, Orange and Pittwater. An organisation linked to the ALP was found to have contributed financially to the campaigns of sitting independent MP Rob Oakeshott and former independent Tony McGrane. The ALP denied any impropriety.

The final week saw national politics dominate the headlines as the Iraq War entered its fourth year, Senator Santo Santoro resigned and federal Labor leader Kevin Rudd, enjoying record approval ratings, announced plans to draw on the Future Fund to finance a nationwide fibre to the node broadband network. On the New South Wales campaign trail, much of the debate in the final week centred on costings.

Labor's own promises, costed by Treasury at $1.6 billion over five years were themselves enough to push the state further into deficit. When Labor demanded that the opposition's figures be made available to Treasury for scrutiny, the Liberals, fearing political interference, engaged auditors KPMG instead. On 22 March, O'Farrell revealed that his party's promises would cost $9.8 billion over five years, though he claimed that this spending would be matched by savings and proceeds from asset sales.

=== 'No way do they deserve another shot' ===
The newspaper editorials on the eve of the election held little cheer for either party. The Australian, The Sydney Morning Herald and The Daily Telegraph had each endorsed Labor at the 2003 election. Though each newspaper expressed misgivings about Debnam's campaigning ability and called the result in Labor's favour, they were unanimous in their attack on Iemma's record.

The Telegraph, the state's highest-circulation newspaper, castigated the incumbents in no uncertain terms: "It's hard to envisage a more tired, rotten, arrogant, useless government than this lot," ran their editorial. The paper slammed Labor's "wholly negative campaign, sneeringly denouncing Peter Debnam's small business record – breathtaking stuff from a Government led by a man whose chief professional experience before Parliament was advising shyster and fixer Graham Richardson." The Telegraph judged Debnam's campaign to have been "incompetent": "He is not a buffoon, yet he has acted one with his campaign gimmickry. He has created traps for himself through silly stunts," it wrote.

If this election campaign has proved anything, it is this: Labor has completely lost its way on policy – and the Liberals are no good at politics ... However, after 12 years, Labor's sustained policy failures should count for more than five weeks' incompetent Liberal campaigning. If anything, the fact that spin-driven Labor has shown that it is vastly better at politics is of itself a reason to chuck them out.

In the Telegraph's view, "No way do they deserve another shot."

The Sydney Morning Herald, a broadsheet, characterised the campaign as "undistinguished" and the rival leaders as "lacklustre". Its editorial focussed on Labor's record over the past 12 years: "New South Wales is feeling the effects of ... second-rateism. It languishes near the bottom on the states' economic league table," the paper wrote. The Herald also criticised "the politicisation of the public service" and a state government "addicted to secrecy". "It is, we admit, an uninspiring choice for voters," the Herald concluded, however "We believe the re-election of Labor is simply one risk too many."

The Australian concurred, in an editorial entitled "Both sides have failed in NSW":

On the one hand incumbent Morris Iemma looks likely to fall over the line by running not just against his opponent but, cynically, against his Labor predecessor Bob Carr as well. On the other is Peter Debnam, a man who should be in the box seat but who has been unable to bring excitement, or policy, to the table. This is a tragedy.

The paper called on voters to "suspend their natural suspicion of Mr Debnam and punish the Government," adding that they did so "in the full knowledge that it won't happen".

== Polling ==
Newspoll: Voting Intention
	First preference				Two-party preferred		Preferred premier
Date	Labor	Liberal	National	Greens	Labor	Coalition	Iemma	Debnam
Jan-Feb 2007	45%	28%	5%	7%	59%	41%	48%	19%
Nov-Dec 2006	39%	32%	5%	7%	53%	47%	45%	23%
Sep-Oct 2006	41%	32%	5%	7%	54%	46%	45%	21%
Jul-Aug 2006	41%	31%	5%	6%	55%	45%	48%	20%
May-Jun 2006	38%	33%	6%	7%	52%	48%	42%	22%
Mar-Apr 2006	36%	38%	6%	6%	48%	52%	42%	23%
Jan-Feb 2006	34%	36%	7%	6%	49%	51%	42%	22%
Nov-Dec 2005	34%	37%	6%	7%	48%	52%	40%	18%
Sep-Oct 2005	38%	33%	5%	8%	53%	47%	42%	17%
2003 election	42.7%	24.7%	9.7%	8.2%	56.2%	43.8%

Opinion polls conducted in the leadup to the election consistently put Iemma ahead of Debnam as preferred premier. According to Newspoll, as of December 2006, 45% of respondents backed Iemma, while only 23% backed Debnam.

Although the Coalition fared better in polls of voting intention, the Liberals and Nationals consistently trailed Labor. According to Newspoll, the Coalition has not led the ALP since early 2006. Pollster Roy Morgan says that Labor has consistently led the Coalition since Iemma became premier. The most recent Roy Morgan figure showed Labor well ahead, 60.5% to 39.5%, on a two-party-preferred basis.

Given the size of the government's majority - a hangover from the 1999 and 2003 landslides - the Coalition needed to perform far better to have had a chance of taking office.
