= Linda Burney =

Australian politician (born 1957)

The Honourable Linda Burney
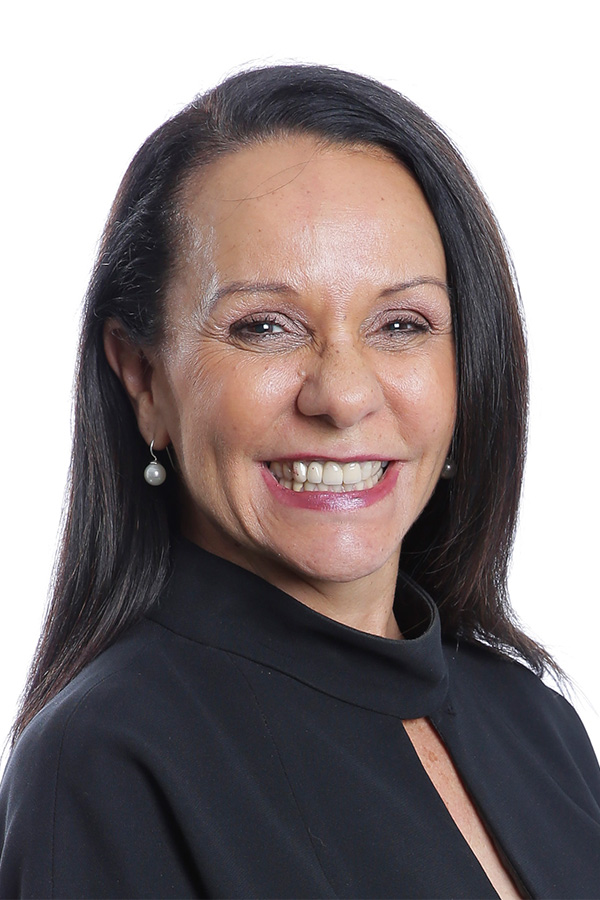

Minister for Indigenous Australians
- In office 1 June 2022 – 29 July 2024
- Prime Minister: Anthony Albanese
- Preceded by: Ken Wyatt
- Succeeded by: Malarndirri McCarthy

Member of the Australian Parliament for Barton
- In office 2 July 2016 – 28 March 2025
- Preceded by: Nickolas Varvaris
- Succeeded by: Ash Ambihaipahar

Deputy Leader of the Opposition in New South Wales
- In office 8 April 2011 – 7 March 2016
- Leader: John Robertson; Luke Foley
- Preceded by: Jillian Skinner
- Succeeded by: Michael Daley

National President of the Labor Party
- In office 27 December 2008 – 30 July 2009
- Preceded by: Mike Rann
- Succeeded by: Michael Williamson
NSW Minister (2007–2011)
Minister for Community Services
In office 8 September 2008 – 28 March 2011
Premier	Nathan Rees; Kristina Keneally
Preceded by	Kevin Greene
Succeeded by	Pru Goward (Family and Community Services)
Minister for Youth
In office 2 April 2007 – 5 September 2008
Premier	Morris Iemma
Preceded by	Reba Meagher
Succeeded by	Graham West

Member of the New South Wales Parliament for Canterbury
- In office 22 March 2003 – 6 May 2016
- Preceded by: Kevin Moss
- Succeeded by: Sophie Cotsis

Personal details
- Born: 25 April 1957 (age 69) Whitton, New South Wales, Australia
- Party: Labor
- Spouse: Rick Farley (d. 2006)
- Children: 2
- Education: Mitchell College of Advanced Education
- Occupation: Teacher
- Website: www.lindaburney.com.au

Linda Jean Burney (born 25 April 1957) is an Australian Labor Party (ALP) politician who was the member of Parliament (MP) for the division of Barton from 2016 to 2025. She was the minister for Indigenous Australians from 2022 to July 2024. She was formerly a member of the New South Wales Legislative Assembly (MLA) for the district of Canterbury from 2003 to 2016 and previously a teacher.

Burney, a member of the New South Wales Legislative Assembly representing Canterbury for Labor from 2003 to 2016. During this election time she was the New South Wales Deputy Leader of the Opposition and was also Shadow Minister for Education and Shadow Minister for Aboriginal Affairs. In the Keneally ministry, she was the Minister for the State Plan and Minister for Community Services. During 2008 and 2009, Burney served as the National President of the Labor Party.

Burney, who is Wiradjuri, was the first known person to identify as Aboriginal to serve in the New South Wales Parliament upon her election in 2003. She later became the first known woman to identify as Aboriginal in the House of Representatives upon her entry into federal politics at the 2016 election.

After the election of the ALP at the 2022 federal election, Burney was appointed minister for Indigenous Australians in the Albanese government. In July 2024 she resigned from the ministry and announced that she would retire from parliament at the 2025 election.

== Early life and education ==
Burney was born on 25 April 1957 in Whitton, a small town in south-west New South Wales near Leeton, and grew up there. She is of Wiradjuri and Scottish descent. She said in her inaugural speech to NSW Parliament that she did not grow up knowing her Aboriginal family, and only met her father, Nonny Ingram, in 1984. She subsequently met ten brothers and sisters. She was raised by her elderly aunt and uncle, siblings Nina and Billy Laing, who "gave [her] the ground on which [she] stood" and taught her "the values of honesty, loyalty and respect".

Burney attended the local primary school in Whitton. She did her first four years of secondary school at Leeton High School and final two at Penrith High School.

She was one of the first Aboriginal students to graduate from the Mitchell College of Advanced Education (now known as Charles Sturt University), where she obtained a Diploma of Teaching in 1978. She received an Honorary Doctorate in Education from Charles Sturt University in 2002.

== Career in education ==
Burney began her career teaching at Lethbridge Park public school in western Sydney from 1979 to 1981, after which she worked at the Aboriginal Education Unit (Policy) of the NSW Department of Education from 1981 to 1983.

She was involved in the New South Wales Aboriginal Education Consultative Group (NSW AECG) from the 1983 to 1998, participating in the development and implementation of the first Aboriginal education policy in Australia. She became president of AECG in 1988.

== Aboriginal Affairs ==
In 1998 Burney was appointed deputy director general of the Department of Aboriginal Affairs (NSW), and assumed the role of director general from 2000 to 2003.

== Political career ==
=== Early involvement ===
Burney was an unsuccessful candidate at the 1997 Australian Constitutional Convention election, running on the "Australian Reconciliation" ticket alongside Frank Brennan, Wendy McCarthy, and Aden Ridgeway. The group polled 0.7 percent of first-preference votes in New South Wales.

Burney is a member of Labor Left. In 2006 she was elected National Vice-president of the Australian Labor Party, and during 2008 and 2009 served as National President.

=== NSW state parliament ===
When Burney was elected as the Member for Canterbury in 2003, she became the first Aboriginal person to serve in the NSW Parliament. In her inaugural speech to the Legislative Assembly she said:

I am a member of the mighty Wiradjuri Aboriginal nation […] Growing up as an Aboriginal child looking into the mirror of our country was difficult and alienating. Your reflection in the mirror was at best ugly and distorted, and at worst nonexistent.

Burney was appointed Parliamentary Secretary for Education and Training in 2005. Following the 2007 election Burney became Minister for Fair Trading, Minister for Youth, and Minister for Volunteering. In September 2008, she was promoted to Minister for Community Services, and in December 2009 she was appointed Minister for the State Plan.

Burney's appointment as Minister for Community Services was two months prior to the handing down of the report of the Special Commission of Inquiry into Child Protection Services by retired Supreme Court Justice James Wood in November 2008. She was the lead minister in a whole of government reform plan, "Keep Them Safe", that commenced implementing the recommendations of the inquiry.

As minister, Burney was the inaugural patron of the NSW Volunteer of the Year Award, a major NSW Government supported initiative.

Burney held the community services and state plan portfolios until ALP's defeat at the 2011 state election. Following the election, Burney was elected as Deputy Leader of the Labor Party and Deputy Leader of the Opposition after former Deputy Premier Carmel Tebbutt chose not to stand for the position. She also became the Shadow Minister for Planning, Infrastructure and Heritage, Shadow Minister for the Central Coast and the Hunter and Shadow Minister for Sport and Recreation.

On 23 December 2014, as deputy leader, Burney became the interim leader of the opposition after the resignation of John Robertson, and was then re-elected as deputy leader to Luke Foley.

Burney was also the Shadow Minister for Education and Shadow Minister for Aboriginal Affairs until her resignation from state parliament.

=== Federal parliament ===
On 1 March 2016, Burney announced she would stand for preselection to contest the federal seat of Barton at the forthcoming 2016 federal election. She was confirmed as the Labor candidate following a vote by the ALP's national executive. She submitted her resignation to the Speaker of the NSW Legislative Assembly on 6 May 2016, and was succeeded as the state member for Canterbury by Sophie Cotsis following a by-election held on 12 November 2016.

Burney became the first Aboriginal woman to be elected to the federal House of Representatives.

Burney retained the seat of Barton for the ALP at the election, becoming the first Indigenous woman to be elected to the House of Representatives and the second Indigenous person elected to the House after Ken Wyatt in 2010. On 22 July, she was appointed Shadow Minister for Human Services. On 28 June 2018, she added Preventing Family Violence to her portfolio responsibilities and on 22 August 2018, became Shadow Minister for Families and Social Services.

Burney was re-elected at the 2019 federal election with an increased majority. After the election she retained the families and social services portfolio in Anthony Albanese's shadow ministry and was additionally made Shadow Minister for Indigenous Australians in place of Patrick Dodson.

Since the election of a federal Labor government in the 2022 Australian election on 21 May 2022, with Anthony Albanese as prime minister of Australia, Burney was appointed Minister for Indigenous Australians, sworn in on 1 June 2022. becoming the first Aboriginal woman to serve in that position.

On 25 July 2024 Burney announced her retirement from federal Parliament at the next election ahead of a cabinet reshuffle that was announced on 28 July 2024. She was replaced as Minister for Indigenous Australians by Malarndirri McCarthy.

==== Committee service ====
- Joint Standing Committee on the National Disability Insurance Scheme, 10 September 2018 – 1 July 2019
- Joint select committee on Constitutional Recognition Relating to Aboriginal and Torres Strait Islander Peoples (2018), 26 March 2018 – 29 November 2018

== Other roles ==
Burney has held senior positions in the non-government sector, serving on a number of boards including SBS, the NSW Anti-Discrimination Board and the NSW Board of Studies. Burney was an executive member of the National Council for Aboriginal Reconciliation, President of the NSW Aboriginal Education Consultative Group and is a former Director-General of the NSW Department of Aboriginal Affairs.

In 1996, she delivered the Frank Archibald Memorial Lecture at the University of New England, on the topic of "Education and Social Justice".

In 2006, Burney gave the seventh Vincent Lingiari Memorial Lecture, and in 2008 gave the sixth Henry Parkes Oration.

As part of the 2012 Sydney Festival, Burney performed as herself delivering her inaugural speech to the NSW Parliament in a theatrical production called I am Eora.

She gave the Lowitja O'Donoghue Oration at the Don Dunstan Foundation in Adelaide on 31 May 2022, in which she spoke about the Albanese government's commitment to the Uluru Statement from the Heart.

== Recognition ==
Burney's achievements have been recognised with the following honours and awards:

- 1992: Department of School Education (NSW) Director General's Award for Outstanding Service to Public Schools
- 2002: Centenary Medal
- 2002: Honorary doctorate from Charles Sturt University
- 2010: Meritorious Service to Public Education and Training Award
- 2014: NAIDOC Lifetime Achievement Award

== Personal life ==
Burney has a son and a daughter. Her partner for a number of years, until his death in 2006, was Rick Farley. Her son, Binni, died suddenly on 24 October 2017.

Government offices
Preceded by Geoff Scott	Director General of the Department of Aboriginal Affairs; 2000–2003	Succeeded by Jody Broun
New South Wales Legislative Assembly
Preceded by Kevin Moss	Member for Canterbury; 2003–2016	Succeeded by Sophie Cotsis
Political offices
Preceded by Reba Meagher	Minister for Youth; 2007–2008	Succeeded by Graham West
New title	Minister for Volunteering; 2007–2008	Succeeded by Graham West
Preceded by Diane Beamer	Minister for Fair Trading; 2007–2008	Succeeded by Virginia Judge
Preceded by Kevin Greene	Minister for Community Services; 2008–2011	Succeeded by Pru Goward as Minister for Family and Community Services
Preceded by Verity Firth	Minister for Women; 2009	Succeeded by Jodi McKay
New title	Minister for the State Plan; 2009–2011	Post abolished
Preceded by Jillian Skinner	Deputy Leader of the Opposition of New South Wales; 2011–2016	Succeeded by Michael Daley
Party political offices
Preceded by John Faulkner	National President of the Australian Labor Party; 2008–2009	Succeeded by Michael Williamson
Preceded by Carmel Tebbutt	Deputy Leader of the Australian Labor Party (New South Wales Branch); 2011–2016	Succeeded by Michael Daley
Parliament of Australia
Preceded by Nickolas Varvaris	Member for Barton; 2016–2025	Succeeded by Ash Ambihaipahar
Political offices
Preceded by Ken Wyatt	Minister for Indigenous Australians; 2022–2024	Succeeded by Malarndirri McCarthy
