= Len Reynolds (politician) =

Australian politician

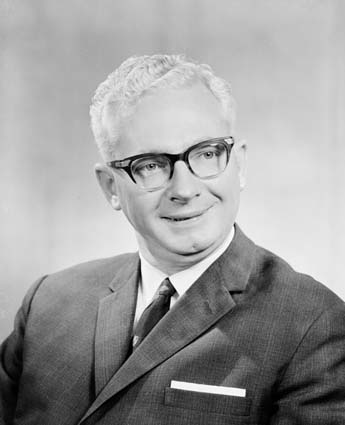

Member of the Australian Parliament for Barton
- In office 22 November 1958 – 26 November 1966
- Preceded by: H. V. Evatt
- Succeeded by: Bill Arthur
- In office 25 October 1969 – 11 November 1975
- Preceded by: Bill Arthur
- Succeeded by: Jim Bradfield

Personal details
- Born: 19 November 1923 Harden, New South Wales
- Died: 14 July 1980 (aged 56)
- Party: Australian Labor Party
- Education: University of Sydney
- Occupation: Teacher

Military service
- Allegiance: Australia
- Branch/service: Royal Australian Air Force
- Years of service: 1943–1946
- Rank: Leading Aircraftman
- Unit: 60th Operational Base Unit

Leonard James Reynolds (19 November 1923 – 14 July 1980) was an Australian politician who served as a Labor member of the Parliament of Australia from 1958 to 1966 and from 1969 to 1975.

Born in Harden, New South Wales, Reynolds was educated at state schools before attending the University of Sydney. He served in the Royal Australian Air Force from 1943 to 1946 and was subsequently a teacher and education lecturer.

In 1958, Reynolds was selected as the Labor candidate for the seat of Barton, which party leader H. V. Evatt was leaving as it was perceived to be too marginal. Reynolds won the seat and held it until 1966, when he was defeated by Liberal candidate Bill Arthur. Reynolds defeated Arthur in 1969, and held the seat until his retirement in 1975. He died in 1980.

Parliament of Australia
Preceded by H. V. Evatt	Member for Barton; 1958 – 1966	Succeeded by Bill Arthur
Preceded by Bill Arthur	Member for Barton; 1969 – 1975	Succeeded by Jim Bradfield
