= Nickolas Varvaris =

Australian politician

Member of the Australian Parliament for Barton
- In office 7 September 2013 – 2 July 2016
- Preceded by: Robert McClelland
- Succeeded by: Linda Burney

Personal details
- Born: 25 May 1974 (age 52) Sydney, Australia
- Party: Liberal Party of Australia
- Profession: Politician

Nickolas Varvaris (born 25 May 1974) is a former Australian politician. He was the Liberal member for the House of Representatives seat of Barton between 2013 and 2016. He recontested his seat at the 2016 election but lost to Labor's Linda Burney.

== Early years and background ==
Varvaris was born a twin child in a Greek migrant family of five children, in Sydney, New South Wales. A BBus (UTS), CPA graduate, he owned his own local business before entering politics. He was also a councillor of the Kogarah City Council from 1999 and was the mayor from 2008.

== Parliament ==
Varvaris was the Liberal member of the Australian House of Representatives, representing the Division of Barton in New South Wales since the 2013 federal election, achieving a two-party swing of 7.2 percent in Barton to finish with a two-party vote of just 50.3 percent, which made Barton the government's most marginal seat in the country.

A redistribution prior to the 2016 federal election erased Varvaris' knife-edge majority and gave Labor a notional margin of 54.4 percent. It was not until under on-going pressure in May 2016 that Varvaris eventually confirmed his intention to re-contest the seat. Linda Burney contested the seat for Labor, and won it with a swing of over 3 percent.

Varvaris did not live in his electorate at the time of the 2016 election, but in neighbouring Cook.

== Family ==
He is married with two children.

Parliament of Australia
Preceded by Robert McClelland	Member for Barton; 2013–2016	Succeeded by Linda Burney
