= Robert McClelland (Australian politician) =

Australian politician

The Honourable Justice Robert McClelland AO
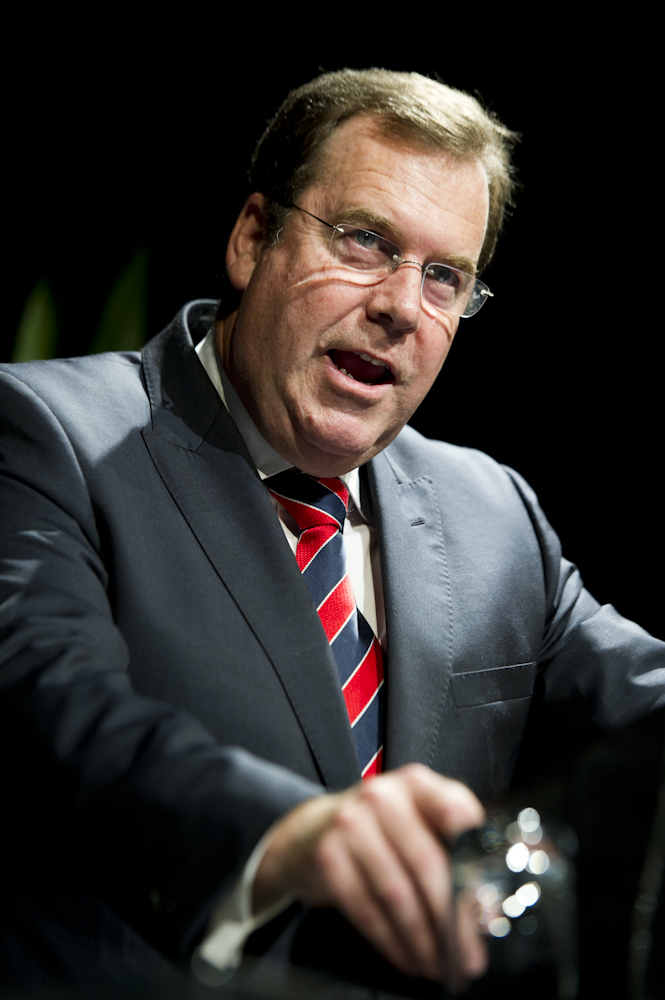
- McClelland in 2011

Deputy Chief Justice of the Federal Circuit and Family Court of Australia
- Incumbent
- Assumed office 10 June 2018
- Nominated by: Tony Abbott
- Preceded by: John Faulks

Judge of the Family Court of Australia
- Incumbent
- Assumed office 16 June 2015
- Nominated by: Tony Abbott
- Preceded by: Stuart Fowler

Attorney-General of Australia
- In office 3 December 2007 – 14 December 2011
- Prime Minister: Kevin Rudd; Julia Gillard
- Preceded by: Philip Ruddock
- Succeeded by: Nicola Roxon

Vice-President of the Executive Council
- In office 14 September 2010 – 5 March 2012
- Preceded by: John Faulkner
- Succeeded by: Tony Burke

Member of the Australian Parliament for Barton
- In office 2 March 1996 – 5 August 2013
- Preceded by: Gary Punch
- Succeeded by: Nickolas Varvaris

Personal details
- Born: Robert Bruce McClelland; 26 January 1958 (age 68) Sydney, New South Wales, Australia
- Party: Labor
- Relations: Alfred McClelland (grandfather)
- Parent: Doug McClelland (father)
- Education: University of New South Wales; University of Sydney

Robert Bruce McClelland AO (born 26 January 1958) is an Australian judge and former politician who has served on the Federal Circuit and Family Court of Australia since 2015, including as Deputy Chief Justice of that court since 2018. He was previously Attorney-General of Australia from 2007 to 2011, and a member of the House of Representatives from 1996 to 2013, representing the Labor Party.

== Early life ==
McClelland was born in Sydney on 26 January 1958. He is one of three children born to Lorna (née McNeill) and Douglas McClelland. His father was elected to the Senate in 1962 and was a minister in the Whitlam government and president of the Senate. His grandfather Alfred McClelland was a state MP in New South Wales from 1920 to 1932.

McClelland was educated at Blakehurst High School before studying at the University of New South Wales, where he gained bachelor's degrees in arts and law, and the University of Sydney where he gained a master's degree in law.

Prior to entering politics, McClelland was an associate to Justice Phillip Evatt of the Federal Court of Australia from 1981 to 1982, before becoming a solicitor and ultimately partner with law firm Turner Freeman. He was involved in litigation and during the Super League war in 1996 oversaw six cases for the St George Dragons, a rugby league club of which his father was chairman.

== Politics ==
=== Opposition, 1996–2007 ===
McClelland joined the ALP in 1972 and was a branch secretary and delegate to state conference. He was elected to the House of Representatives at the 1996 federal election, retaining the seat of Barton for the Labor Party following the retirement of Gary Punch.

McClelland was appointed to Kim Beazley's shadow cabinet after the 1998 election. He held various senior shadow portfolios under Beazley and his successors, including attorney-general (1998–2003), workplace relations (2001–2003), homeland security (2003–2005), defence (2004–2006) and foreign affairs (2006–2007).

After McClelland indicated on 8 October 2007 his party's disapproval of death sentences for all south Asian countries, his leader Kevin Rudd criticised the speech as "insensitive" because it was made on the eve of the anniversary of the Bali bombings. McClelland apologised, but critics called the positions inconsistent and Rudd chose not to appoint McClelland as Foreign Minister when Labor won the 2007 election. Instead, he was appointed Attorney-General. As Attorney-General McClelland introduced the Crimes Legislation Amendment (Torture Prohibition and Death Penalty Abolition) Act 2010.

=== Attorney-General, 2007–2011 ===
In the 2007 federal election, McClelland was re-elected to the seat of Barton with a 4.53% swing toward the Labor Party. He was appointed Attorney-General of Australia in the first Rudd government on 3 December 2007. He continued in the position after Julia Gillard replaced Rudd as prime minister in 2010 and after the 2010 election was also appointed Vice-President of the Executive Council.

In February 2008, McClelland stated that it was unacceptable that the ACT government, which proposed to allow same-sex couples to enter into civil unions, would give the right to hold public ceremonies to celebrate their unions. McClelland was criticised by Greens Senator Bob Brown, who said it was displaying the ugly face of Labor conservatism. In September 2008 McClelland introduced the Same-Sex Relationships (Equal Treatment in Commonwealth Laws—General Law Reform) Bill 2008 which gave same sex couples equal rights in respect to social security, taxation and superannuation laws.

McClelland has said those protesting against Australian Christian Lobby would not have recognised that the ACL had supported amendments to 84 pieces of Commonwealth legislation that removed discrimination against same-sex couples.

McClelland remarked that on Polygamy in Australia "There is absolutely no way that the government will be recognising polygamist relationships. They are unlawful and they will remain as such. Under Australian law, marriage is defined as the union of a man and a woman to the exclusion of all others. Polygamous marriage necessarily offends this definition."

McClelland was responsible for implementing the recommendations of the Victorian Bushfire Royal Commission including the implementation of a National Emergency Warning System.

As Attorney-General, McClelland undertook an extensive review of the International Arbitration Act. That review formed the basis of amendments to the Act that were introduced in 2010. The Amendments gave arbitral tribunals a wider degree of flexibility in controlling arbitral proceedings and included inserting an object to emphasise the importance of international arbitration in facilitating international trade and commerce. Provisions were also introduced to require Courts applying the Act and the United Nations Commission on International Trade Law (UNCITRAL) Model Law on International Commercial Arbitration Law to have regard to the fact that arbitration is an ‘efficient, impartial, enforceable and timely’ method of dispute resolution.

McClelland also introduced amendments to federal family law, including by giving the federal family law courts jurisdiction over the financial affairs of de facto spouses.

=== Final years in parliament ===
On 14 December 2011, McClelland was removed as attorney-general during a cabinet reshuffle and instead appointed Minister for Emergency Management, Minister for Housing and Minister for Homelessness. With support from the Labor Right faction, he was retained as a member of cabinet against Gillard's wishes, despite his portfolios typically not being considered of cabinet rank.

McClelland was one of five cabinet ministers to support Rudd's unsuccessful leadership challenge in February 2012, along with Anthony Albanese, Chris Bowen, Kim Carr and Martin Ferguson. He was removed from his ministerial portfolios on 5 March 2012 in a further reshuffle.

In March 2012, a report by the Auditor-General found that McClelland had breached anti-pork barrelling guidelines as attorney-general by issuing four grants to bodies within his own electorate.

On 29 January 2013, McClelland announced that he would not contest the 2013 federal election.

== Later activities ==
On 28 May 2015, McClelland was appointed to the Family Court of Australia by Attorney-General George Brandis. He is based in the Court's Sydney registry and his appointment commenced on 16 June 2015. He was appointed Deputy Chief Justice of that court with effect from 10 December 2018.

In October 2026, it was announced that McClelland had been nominated to serve as head of the National Anti-Corruption Commission, with his appointment commencing on 11 January 2027.

== Honours ==
In 2022, McClelland was appointed Officer of the Order of Australia in the 2022 Queen's Birthday Honours for "distinguished service to the people and Parliament of Australia, to the law, social justice and law reform".

== See also ==
- First Rudd Ministry
- First Gillard Ministry
- Second Gillard Ministry

Parliament of Australia
Preceded by Gary Punch	Member of Parliament for Barton; 1996–2013	Succeeded by Nickolas Varvaris
Political offices
Preceded by Philip Ruddock	Attorney General of Australia; 2007–2011	Succeeded by Nicola Roxon
Preceded by John Faulkner	Vice President of the Executive Council; 2010–2012	Succeeded by Tony Burke
