= Bill Arthur =

Australian politician (1918–1982)

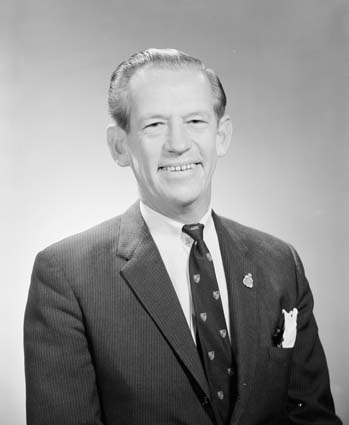

Member of the Australian Parliament for Barton
- In office 26 November 1966 – 25 October 1969
- Preceded by: Len Reynolds
- Succeeded by: Len Reynolds

Personal details
- Born: 16 April 1918 Arncliffe, New South Wales, Australia
- Died: c. 28 February 1982 (aged 63) Royal National Park, New South Wales, Australia
- Party: Liberal
- Occupation: Research officer

Military service
- Branch/service: Australian Army
- Years of service: 1941–1946
- Rank: Lieutenant

William Tevlin Arthur (16 April 1918 – c. 28 February 1982) was an Australian politician. He was a member of the Liberal Party and served in the House of Representatives from 1966 to 1969, representing the New South Wales seat of Barton. He was an unsuccessful candidate for political office on several occasions at state and federal level and later worked as a staffer for Prime Minister John Gorton. He was murdered at the Royal National Park in 1982.

== Early life ==
Arthur was born on 16 April 1918 in Arncliffe, New South Wales. His father was a carpenter.

Arthur enlisted in the Citizen Military Force in August 1940, serving as a bombardier. He transferred to the Australian Imperial Force in September 1942 and was commissioned as a lieutenant. He served in New Guinea and Borneo during the war and was transferred to the reserve of officers in September 1946.

After his military service, Arthur worked for shipping agents Birt and Co. Pty. Ltd. and was an active trade unionist as a member of the Shipping Officers' Association. He was employed as the company's research officer where he produced "an annual economic and financial sruvey of Australia, an annual coverage of the wool industry, and edited and wrote for a monthly shipping and trade magazine". He was also a lecturer with the Australian Army Education Service.

== Politics ==
Arthur was an unsuccessful Liberal candidate for the New South Wales Legislative Assembly at the 1953 state election, standing against Australian Labor Party (ALP) MP Clive Evatt in the seat of Hurstville. He subsequently contested the House of Representatives seat of Barton at the 1954 federal election, standing against Clive's brother H. V. Evatt, the federal leader of the opposition. He recontested Barton against H. V. Evatt at the 1955 election and against Len Reynolds at the 1958 election, coming within a few hundred votes of victory on both occasions.

On his fourth attempt, Arthur was elected to Barton in the Coalition's landslide victory at the 1966 federal election, defeating Reynolds. His maiden speech to parliament focused mainly on foreign affairs and included a call for increased foreign aid to Asia and a recollection of his experience in "addressing anti-Communist underground meetings in Czechoslovakia".

Arthur served on the Joint Statutory Committee on the Broadcasting of Parliamentary Proceedings from 1967 to 1969. With his seat regarded as a key electorate for the Liberal Party, he concentrated on local matters including the reclamation of the Botany Bay shoreline, the maintenance of the jet curfew at Sydney Airport, and opposition to a second airport at Towra Point. He was defeated by Reynolds at the 1969 election after a single term in office.

== Later life ==
After his parliamentary defeat, Arthur joined the office of Prime Minister John Gorton as a research officer. He also acted as Gorton's press secretary in the absence of Tony Eggleton. His position was terminated by the new prime minister William McMahon following the 1971 Liberal leadership spill.

== Personal life ==
Arthur was a "keen supporter of the arts" and served on the board of The Australian Ballet, including as deputy chairman in 1978. Earlier in his life he was a gymnastics and lifesaving instructor with the YMCA and a volunteer social worker.

=== Murder ===
Arthur was stabbed to death on or about 28 February 1982, aged 63, at his holiday cabin at South Era Beach in the Royal National Park. His naked body was discovered on 5 March 1982 in a "decomposed state", with eleven stab wounds.

Garry Andrew Wait, a 20-year-old waiter, was charged with Arthur's murder. He pleaded guilty to manslaughter but not guilty to murder, on the grounds that Arthur had made "homosexual advances toward him". He additionally alleged that a police sergeant had told him that he would only be charged with manslaughter, as Arthur was known to be homosexual. Wait was convicted of murder in the Supreme Court of New South Wales in February 1983 and sentenced to life imprisonment. The presiding judge Colin Begg found that "no evidence had been given that Mr Arthur was a homosexual", that Arthur had been stabbed in the back while doing a crossword puzzle, and that Wait was a heroin addict with a history of violent offences.

Parliament of Australia
Preceded by Len Reynolds	Member for Barton; 1966 – 1969	Succeeded by Len Reynolds
