= Ash Ambihaipahar =

Australian politician

Ash Ambihaipahar MP

Member of the Australian Parliament for Barton
- Incumbent
- Assumed office 3 May 2025
- Preceded by: Linda Burney

Councillor of Georges River Council for Mortdale Ward
- In office 21 September 2022 – 27 May 2025
- Preceded by: Warren Tegg
- Succeeded by: Gerard Hayes

Personal details
- Born: Ashvini Ambihaipahar; 24 April 1987 (age 39) Sydney, New South Wales, Australia
- Party: Labor
- Education: Danebank
- Alma mater: University of Sydney (BSc), University of Technology Sydney (JD)
- Occupation: Politician; Solicitor

Ashvini "Ash" Ambihaipahar (/ˌæmbiːˈheɪpəhɑːr/ AM-bee-HAY-pə-har;; born 24 April 1987) is a member of the Australian House of Representatives representing the Division of Barton for the Australian Labor Party. She replaced the retired member Linda Burney, securing a four-point swing at the 2025 Australian federal election.

Ambihaipahar was born on 24 April 1987 in Sydney and is of Sri Lankan Tamil origin. She grew up in Narwee and Hurstville and attended Hurstville Public School and Danebank. She completed a Bachelor of Science, majoring in Anatomy and Histology and Cell Pathology, at the University of Sydney in 2008. She achieved a postgraduate Juris Doctor degree from the University of Technology Sydney in 2013 and has been a practicing solicitor working in the area of employment and industrial law.

Ambihaipahar was elected at a countback election to represent the Mortdale Ward on Georges River Council in 2022 and was the Labor candidate for Oatley at the 2023 New South Wales state election. She narrowly lost the seat of Oatley to sitting Liberal member Mark Coure. In June 2023, she became a Regional Director at the St Vincent de Paul Society NSW. She was re-elected to Council in 2024.

A member of Prime Minister Anthony Albanese's Labor Left faction, Ambihaipahar's pre-selection for seat of Barton was confirmed by the 21-member Australian Labor Party National Executive in December 2024 with the right faction boycotting the vote. After being elected to represent Barton at the 2025 federal election, she resigned her position on Council in May 2025.

Parliament of Australia
| Preceded by Linda Burney | Member for Barton; 2025–present | Incumbent |
