= Frederick McDonald =

Australian politician

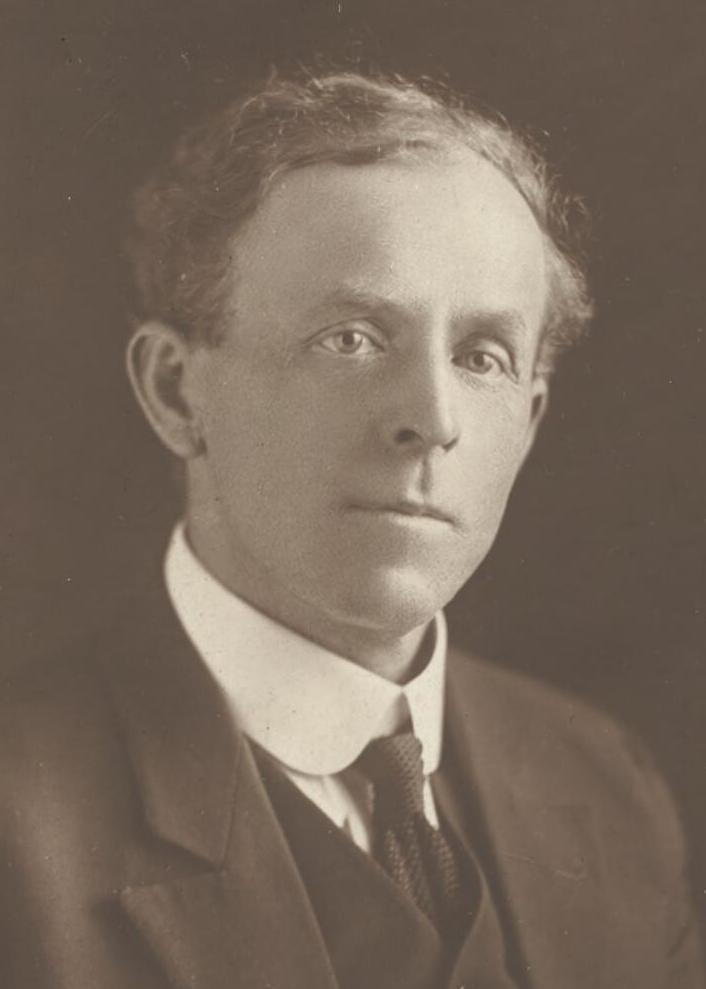

Member of the Australian Parliament for Barton
- In office 16 December 1922 – 14 November 1925
- Preceded by: New seat
- Succeeded by: Thomas Ley

Personal details
- Born: 7 December 1872 Grafton, New South Wales, Australia
- Died: 15 April 1926 (disappeared)
- Party: Australian Labor Party
- Education: University of Sydney
- Profession: Teacher

Frederick Albert McDonald (7 December 1872 – disappeared April 1926) was an Australian politician. He was a Labor member of the Australian House of Representatives for Barton from 1922 until 1925, when he was narrowly defeated by Nationalist Thomas Ley. McDonald was challenging the election result in court when he mysteriously disappeared in 1926. It is widely suspected that Ley, who later died in an insane asylum in England after committing murder and having several other rivals die in mysterious circumstances, was responsible for McDonald's disappearance.

== Early life ==
Frederick McDonald was born in Grafton, New South Wales, and studied at the Sydney Teachers' College and the University of Sydney before becoming a teacher. He had been teaching at Hurstville Superior Public School for thirteen years at the time of his election; among his previous postings was at Wellington. McDonald was president of both the New South Wales Teachers Federation (which he had been involved in founding) and the Assistant Teachers' Association, and had been credited with gaining the Teachers' Federation access to the Industrial Court.

McDonald was president of his local branch of the Labor Party and president of Labor's electorate council for the Lang seat. He was narrowly defeated as a Labor candidate at the 1920 state election. In the 1922 federal election, McDonald contested the new seat of Barton for Labor, defeating the Nationalist member for the abolished seat of Illawarra, Hector Lamond.

McDonald married Mrs. I. B. Burnett at Scots Church in Melbourne in April 1924.

== Political career ==
McDonald was involved in an extremely contentious race for re-election at the 1925 federal election, when he was challenged by Nationalist candidate and former state minister Thomas Ley. During the campaign, Ley lambasted McDonald for his alleged links to communists. On the day before the election, 13 November 1925, McDonald alleged that the year before, Ley had tried to bribe him into not recontesting Barton. Ley ferociously denied the allegations, and on election day issued a writ against McDonald claiming £15,000 for defamation. Ley won the election by 1,090 votes, and McDonald acknowledged the defeat, stating "the Labor movement is ruled by its heart and not its head; had it been ruled by its head there would be a different story to tell".

In January 1926, McDonald challenged the election result in the Court of Disputed Returns on the basis of the bribery allegations. In March 1926, it was reported that he and Ley had agreed on a legal settlement wherein McDonald issued an apology for the bribery allegations and they both stated their intention to withdraw their respective lawsuits. However, it has been suggested that McDonald subsequently "had a fit of remorse" and refused to withdraw the petition.

== Disappearance ==
On 15 April 1926, McDonald disappeared on his way to a meeting with New South Wales Premier Jack Lang, in which he was to have discussed a proposal to have the election result declared void. He was last seen at 2.30pm by his wife outside Challis House in Martin Place when he left for the appointment with Lang, but never arrived. Despite the March announcement, McDonald's Court of Disputed Returns litigation had not been formally withdrawn, and when the matter went to court on 23 April, his solicitor denied knowledge of the settlement and sought an adjournment in the hope that McDonald would be found alive; however, the matter was struck out on the basis of the March announcement. Despite an extensive search, neither McDonald nor his attaché case were ever found.

Initial reports suggested that McDonald was suffering from "nervous trouble" at the time of his disappearance. However, Ley was later deemed insane after committing murder in England, and was committed to Broadmoor Hospital, where he died. It is now widely suspected that Ley may have been responsible for McDonald's disappearance, and several other suspicious deaths of his political and personal opponents.

== See also ==
- List of people who disappeared

Parliament of Australia
Preceded by New seat	Member for Barton; 1922 – 1925	Succeeded by Thomas Ley
