= Gary Punch =

Australian politician

The Honourable Gary Punch
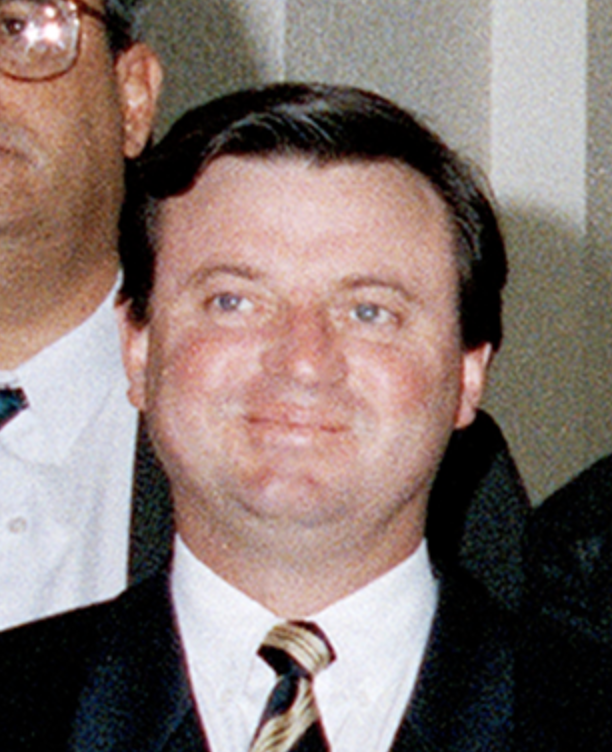

Member of the Australian Parliament for Barton
- In office 5 March 1983 – 29 January 1996
- Preceded by: Jim Bradfield
- Succeeded by: Robert McClelland

Personal details
- Born: 21 August 1957 (age 69) Arncliffe, New South Wales
- Party: Australian Labor Party
- Occupation: Industrial relations manager

Gary Francis Punch (born 21 August 1957) is a former Australian politician and government minister.

Punch was born in Arncliffe, New South Wales and educated at Hurstville Boys High School and subsequently obtained a commerce degree. He was an industrial relations and personnel manager before entering parliament. He was an alderman of Hurstville Municipal Council from 1977 to 1983 and was elected mayor in 1978, when he was 21, and held that position until he stood for parliament.

== Political career ==
Punch beat former secretary of the Australian Labor Party David Combe for Labor preselection to the seat of Barton in the Australian House of Representatives and was elected at the 1983 election. He was appointed Minister for the Arts and Territories in January 1988 in the Third Hawke Ministry. In September 1988, he was appointed Minister for Telecommunications and Aviation Support and held this position until 28 March 1989, when he resigned in opposition to cabinet's decision to build the third runway for Sydney Airport, which adjoined his electorate. He was appointed Parliamentary Secretary to the Minister for Defence in the Second Keating Ministry in March 1993. In March 1994, he was promoted to the outer ministry as Minister for Defence Science and Personnel and held this position until his retirement prior to the 1996 election.

Punch gained a law degree while in parliament and in 1996 he was appointed executive director of the Australian Cotton Foundation, the industry body for cotton growing. He was also the Honorary Chairman of Sydney Olympic FC from 1996 to 1997. In 2000, he began to practise as a lawyer. He was appointed as a director of NRMA Motoring and Services Ltd in 2005.

== Notes ==
Political offices
Preceded by John Brown	Minister for the Arts and Territories; 1988	Succeeded by Clyde Holding
Preceded by Peter Morris	Minister for Telecommunications and Aviation Support; 1988–1989	Succeeded by Ros Kelly
Preceded by John Faulkner	Minister for Defence; Science and Personnel; 1994–1996	Succeeded by Bronwyn Bishop
Parliament of Australia
Preceded by Jim Bradfield	Member for Barton; 1983–1996	Succeeded by Robert McClelland
