= Jim Bradfield =

Australian politician (1933–1989)

Member of the Australian Parliament for Barton
- In office 13 December 1975 – 5 March 1983
- Preceded by: Len Reynolds
- Succeeded by: Gary Punch

Personal details
- Born: 3 July 1933 Sydney, New South Wales, Australia
- Died: 19 November 1989 (aged 56) Kogarah, New South Wales, Australia
- Party: Liberal
- Occupation: Businessman

James Mark Bradfield (3 July 1933 – 19 November 1989) was an Australian businessman and politician. He was a member of the Liberal Party and served in the House of Representatives from 1975 to 1983, representing the New South Wales seat of Barton. Prior to entering parliament he was the co-founder of a chain of tyre stores.

== Early life ==
Bradfield was born in Sydney on 3 July 1933. He was the son of Marion and Mark James Bradfield. His father worked as a bookmaker.

Bradfield was raised in Bondi and attended Sydney Grammar School. After leaving school he began working for Jax Tyres & Auto in Leichhardt.

== Business career ==
Bradfield co-founded tyre retailer Straight Talk Tyres with Jim Geraghty. The company expanded to eleven branches in New South Wales and Victoria from its initial location in Peakhurst. It was the first licensed Australian distributor of Pirelli tyres. Bradfield was an officeholder in the Motor Traders' Association of New South Wales, serving as president of its tyre merchants' section from 1967 to 1968. He divested most of his holdings upon his election to parliament, retaining ownership of three outlets.

== Politics ==
Bradfield was president of a Young Liberals branch in the 1950s. He later served as president of the Liberal Party's Penshurst branch and was a member of the New South Wales state council from 1968 to 1974.

At the 1975 federal election, Bradfield won the seat of Barton for the Liberal Party from the Australian Labor Party (ALP), following the retirement of the incumbent ALP member Len Reynolds. He had previously been an unsuccessful candidate for Liberal preselection at the 1974 election. He focused his campaign on local issues, opposing the creation of a second Sydney airport within his electorate but supporting the creation of Port Botany as a secondary harbour.

Bradfield's seat remained marginal throughout his time in parliament and at the 1980 election he was re-elected by just over 500 votes. He served on several parliamentary committees including the Joint Statutory Committee on Public Accounts from 1978 to 1983. He was defeated at the 1983 election by ALP candidate Gary Punch.

== Personal life ==
Bradfield had four children with his wife Jill (née Bradford), with whom he lived in Oatley, New South Wales. They also had a rural property at Caroona.

Bradfield was diagnosed with melanoma in 1988 and died of the disease at Calvary Hospital, Kogarah on 16 November 1989, aged 56.

Parliament of Australia
Preceded by Len Reynolds	Member for Barton; 1975–1983	Succeeded by Gary Punch
