= James Tully (Australian politician) =

Australian politician (1877–1962)

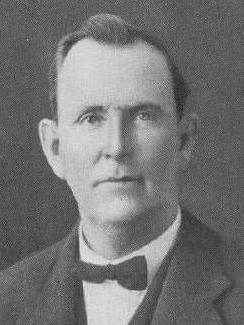

Member of the Australian Parliament for Barton
- In office 17 November 1928 – 19 December 1931
- Preceded by: Thomas Ley
- Succeeded by: Albert Lane

Personal details
- Born: 1877 Grafton, New South Wales
- Died: 15 October 1962 (aged 84–85)
- Party: Labor
- Profession: Teacher

James Thomas Tully (1877 – 15 October 1962) was an Australian politician. He was an Australian Labor Party member of the Australian House of Representatives from 1928 to 1931, representing the electorate of Barton.

Tully was born in Grafton and was educated at the Grafton Superior Public School. He became a teacher in 1896, initially in Grafton for approximately three and a half years, and then being in charge of a series of one-teacher rural schools: Cockatoo Flat near Walcha for two and a half years, Yarrowyck for eight years, and Lorne for two years. He resigned from the Education Department in September 1912 and took up farming and sawmilling at Tullamore; he was also the secretary for the Tullamore branch of the Australian Carriers Union during a pay dispute in 1914. He rejoined the Education Department in August 1923 as an assistant teacher at Hurstville Junior Technical School and taught there until his resignation to contest the federal election in 1928. Tully was also a vice-president of the St George Rugby League Club. He was previously an unsuccessful candidate at the 1917 state election, 1919 federal election and 1922 state election.

In 1928, he was elected to the Australian House of Representatives as the Labor member for Barton, defeating incumbent Nationalist Thomas Ley, and was re-elected in 1929. He retained the seat until 1931, when he was challenged in the wake of the 1931 Labor split by both the United Australia Party's Albert Lane and Lang Labor's John Eldridge, the member for Martin. Lane won the seat, making it the only time in Australian history that two sitting members have been simultaneously defeated for the same seat.

In 1961, he was living with his daughter in the Sydney suburb of Westmead. He died in 1962.

Parliament of Australia
Preceded by Thomas Ley	Member for Barton; 1928 – 1931	Succeeded by Albert Lane
