= Thomas Ley =

Australian politician and convicted murderer

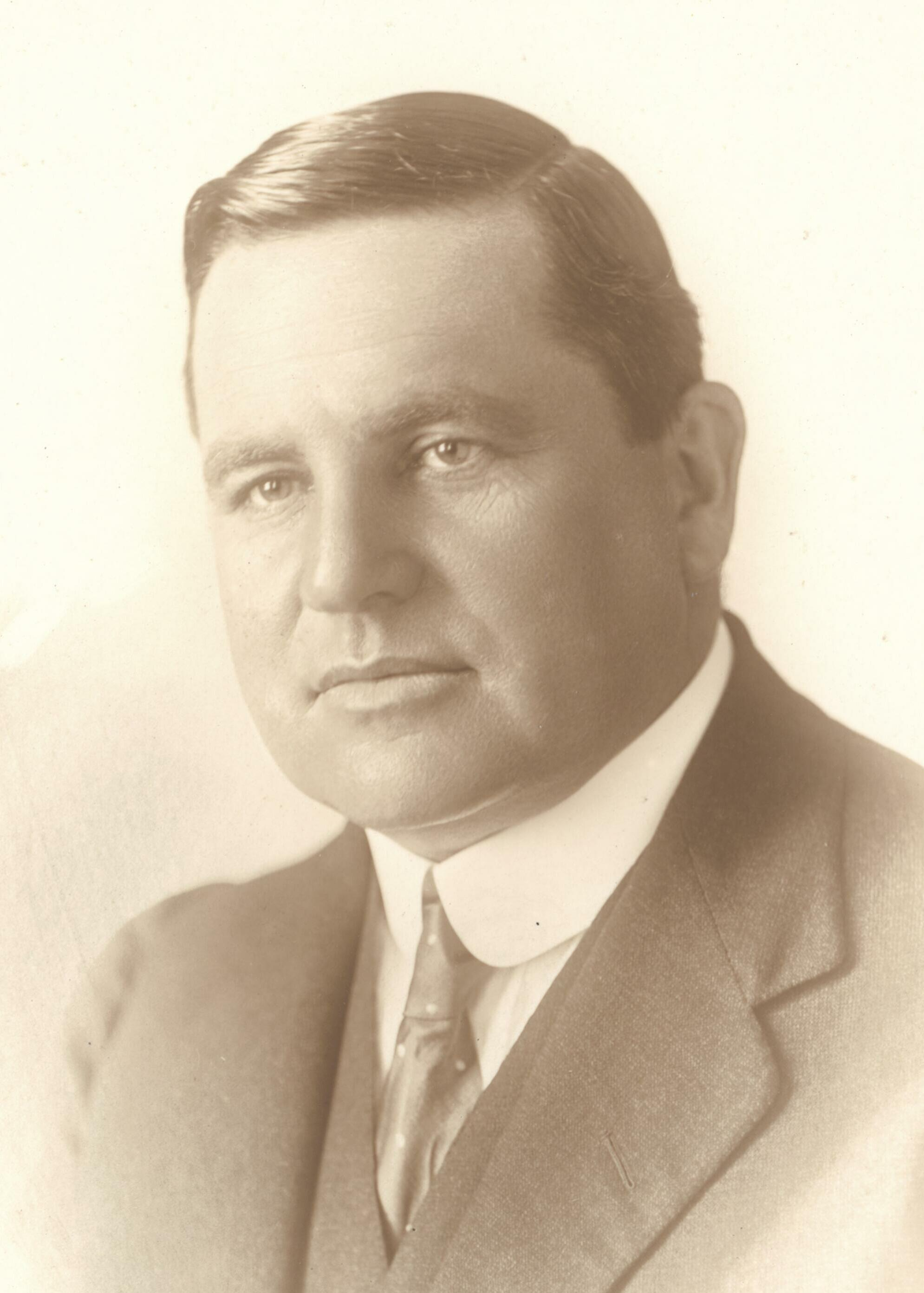
- Ley in 1925

Member of the Australian Parliament for Barton
- In office 14 November 1925 – 17 November 1928
- Preceded by: Frederick McDonald
- Succeeded by: James Tully

Personal details
- Born: 28 October 1880 Bath, Somerset, England
- Died: 24 July 1947 (aged 66) Broadmoor Asylum, Berkshire, England
- Party: Nationalist
- Spouse: Emily Louisa Vernon
- Occupation: Solicitor
- Criminal information

Details
- Date: 1946, allegedly as early as the 1920s
- Killed: 1-4

Thomas John Ley (28 October 1880 – 24 July 1947) was an Australian politician who was convicted of murder in England. He is widely suspected to have been involved in the deaths of a number of people in Australia, including political rivals.

== Early life ==
Ley was born on 28 October 1880 in Bath, Somerset, England, one of four children born to Elizabeth (née Bryant) and Henry Ley. His father, who worked as a butler, died in 1882.

In 1886, Ley's mother moved the family to Australia along with his maternal grandmother. They settled in Sydney, where he attended Crown Street Public School until the age of 10. He began working as a young boy, initially as a paper-boy and messenger, then later as an assistant in his mother's grocery store and as a farm labourer at Windsor. Ley learned shorthand while living in Windsor and at the age of fourteen secured a position as a junior clerk and stenographer with a solicitor on Pitt Street. He joined the office of Norton, Smith & Co. in 1901 and in 1906 became an articled clerk. He was admitted as a solicitor in 1914.

Ley married Emily Louisa (known as "Lewie") Vernon in 1898, the year she emigrated to Australia from England. Both husband and wife were active in politics: she in the international suffrage movement, and he as a state and federal politician from 1917 to 1928.

== State politics ==
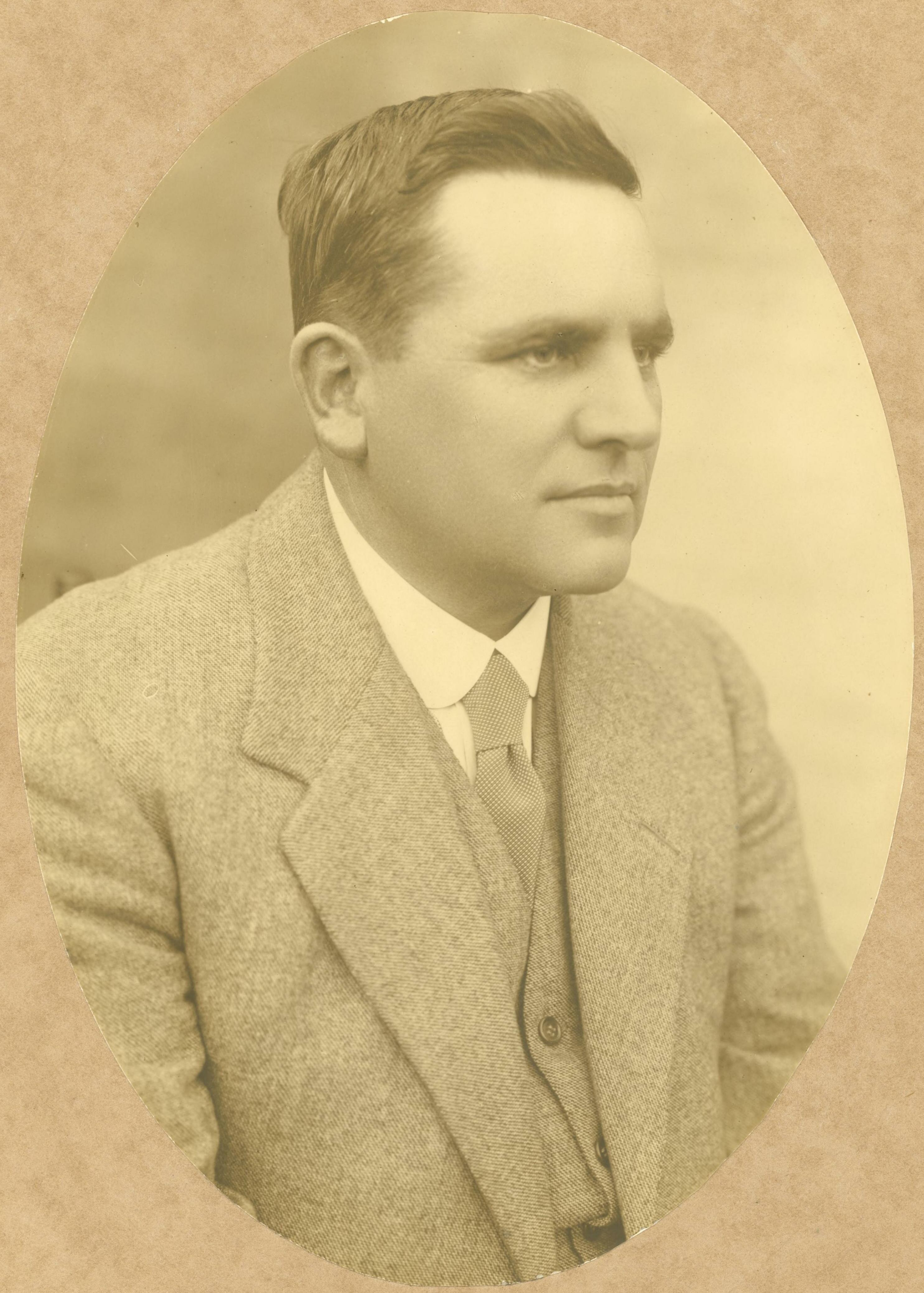
Ley c. 1920

Ley served in the lower house of the New South Wales parliament (1917–25) as member for Hurstville from 1917 to 1920, representing the Nationalist Party, and St George from 1920 to 1925, representing the Progressive Party until 1922. He was a prominent and vocal advocate of proportional representation, which the state adopted in 1919. Both of his electorates were in Sydney's southern suburbs.

As a teetotaler, Ley acquired the nickname "Lemonade Ley", but the temperance movement accused him of betrayal when he supported legislation which eased requirements for the sale of alcohol. It later emerged that Ley was being paid by the brewery lobby. Despite this, he was appointed as New South Wales Minister for Justice from 1922 to 1925 – in the cabinet of Premier Sir George Fuller – and gained a reputation for harsh decisions.

Shortly after he became Minister for Justice, Ley made an official visit to Western Australia and was introduced to Maggie Evelyn Brook, a magistrate's wife. Shortly afterwards the magistrate died; Ley acted for her and her daughter in various financial and legal matters.

== Federal politician ==
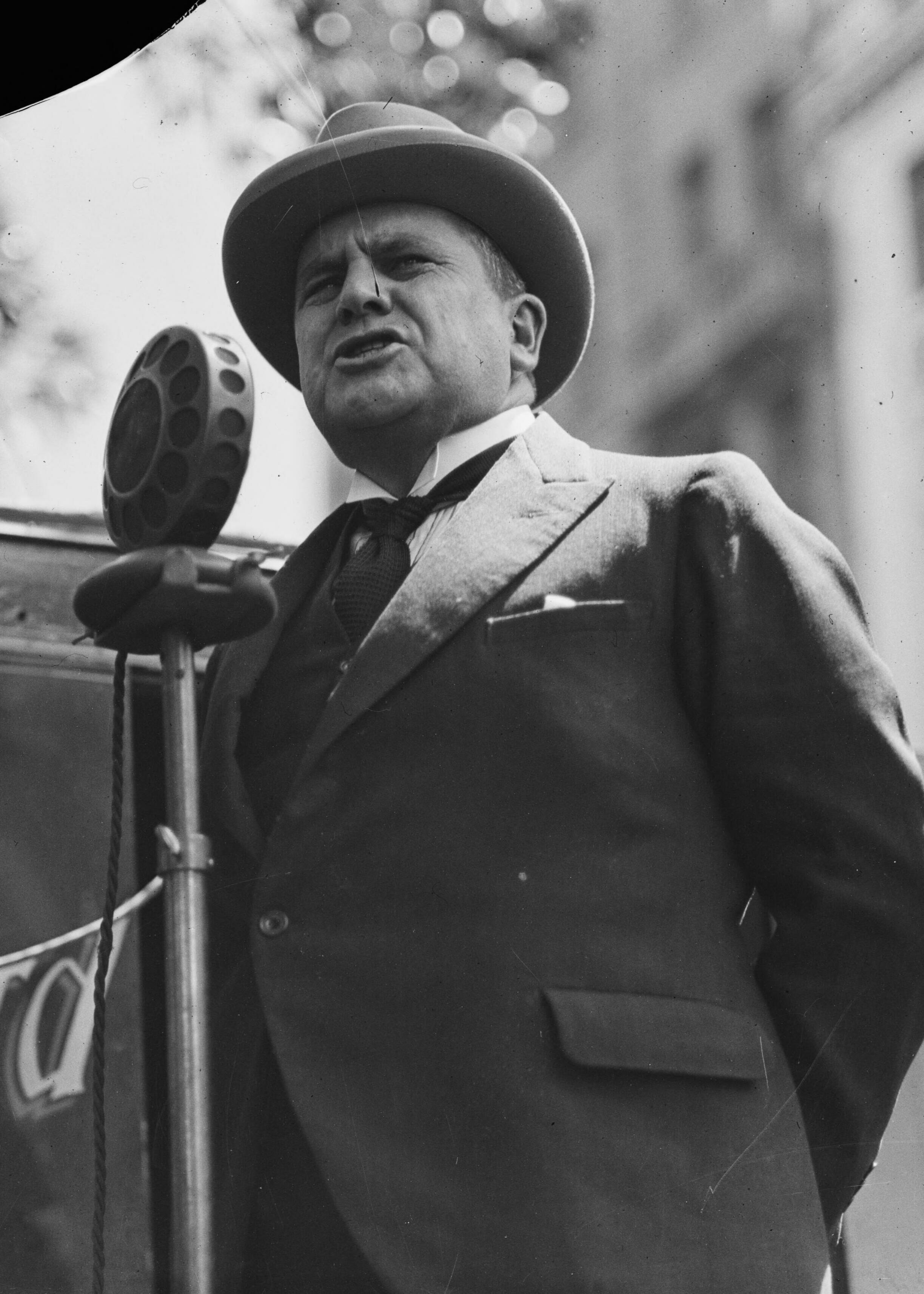
Ley speaking at a rally in Macquarie Place prior to the 1928 federal election

In 1925, Ley stood for the seat of Barton in the federal House of Representatives. He unsuccessfully tried to bribe his Labor opponent, Frederick McDonald, with a £2,000 share in a property at Kings Cross in return for withdrawing from the ballot. McDonald instead publicly revealed the attempted bribe. Despite that, Ley won the election on a large swing as part of the decisive Coalition victory that year.

Conventional wisdom would have suggested that Ley, as a former senior member of the New South Wales government, would have been given a post in the federal cabinet. However, Ley's fellow conservatives, including Prime Minister Stanley Bruce, began to have doubts about him after the election. As a result, Ley was not considered for ministerial preferment.

McDonald took the matter of the bribe to court, but disappeared in mysterious circumstances. The case against Ley collapsed for lack of evidence when McDonald failed to appear. While the disappearance may have been a coincidence, later events put the matter in a more sinister light. In 1928, state legislator Hyman Goldstein, another of Ley's public critics, was found dead after apparently falling from "Suicide Point" on the cliffs of Coogee. Then a group of businessmen, concerned at Ley's reputation for dubious business dealings, appointed Keith Greedor, a former Ley associate turned opponent, to investigate. Travelling to Newcastle by boat, Greedor fell overboard and drowned.

== Return to England ==
After his defeat in the 1928 election, Ley returned to England with Brook, leaving his wife in Australia. Little is recorded of Ley's life during the 1930s. About all that can be said for certain is that he used his move to England to start afresh in dubious business ventures, and during the Second World War he was arrested and convicted for black marketeering.

== The Chalk-pit Murder ==
In 1946, Brook was living in Wimbledon, and Ley had his house at 5 Beaufort Gardens, London, converted into flats. Ley falsely believed that Brook and a barman called John McMain Mudie were having an affair. Ley persuaded two of his labourers that Mudie was a blackmailer, and together they tortured and killed him. The case became known as the "Chalk-pit Murder" because Mudie's body was dumped in a chalk pit on Woldingham Common in Surrey, thirty miles away from Ley's home.

With Lawrence John Smith, Ley was tried at the Old Bailey; both were sentenced to death in March 1947. However, both Smith and Ley escaped the noose: Smith's sentence was commuted to life imprisonment, while Ley was declared insane and sent to Broadmoor Asylum for the Criminally Insane. He died there soon after of a cerebral haemorrhage. He is said to have been the wealthiest person ever to be imprisoned at Broadmoor. He left an estate in New South Wales valued for probate at £744.

Ley's wife had followed him to England in 1942. From Broadmoor, Ley wrote letters and poems, and protested his innocence to his wife and children. After his death, his widow returned to Australia. She died at Bowral, New South Wales in 1956.

New South Wales Legislative Assembly
| Preceded by Sam Toombs | Member for Hurstville; 1917–1920 | District abolished |
| New district | Member for St George; 1920–1925; With: Bagnall, Cann, Gosling, Arkins | Succeeded by William Bagnall |
Political offices
| Preceded by Thomas Mutch as Minister of Public Instruction | Minister of Public Instruction and Labour and Industry; 1921 | Succeeded by Thomas Mutch as Minister of Public Instruction |
| Preceded by Greg McGirr as Minister for Labour | Minister of Public Instruction and Labour and Industry; 1921 | Succeeded by Edward Kavanagh as Minister for Labour |
| Preceded by William McKell | Minister for Justice; 1922–1925 | Succeeded by William McKell |
Parliament of Australia
| Preceded by Frederick McDonald | Member for Barton; 1925–1928 | Succeeded by James Tully |
