= New South Wales State Plan =

State Plan cover.

The State Plan, A New Direction for NSW is a document prepared by the New South Wales Premier's Department within the Government of New South Wales and released on 14 November 2006. The plan, modelled on South Australia’s Strategic Plan (March 2004), sets priorities for the state government over a ten-year period.

According to the document, "The State Plan sets out the goals the community wants the NSW Government to work towards."

The plan puts particular focus on projects and targets in five areas:

- Rights, respect and responsibility (police, justice, anti-social behaviour, citizenship and volunteering)
- Delivering better services (health, education, public transport and roads)
- Fairness and opportunity (social justice and Aboriginal affairs)
- Growing prosperity across NSW (state and regional development)
- Environment for living (environment, recreation and the arts)

== Development ==
The Premier's Department released a draft state plan in August 2006 and called for submissions from the community. The department then held consultation forums with community leaders and randomly selected members of the community at large. Their feedback was grouped by region and area of concern, and used to refine the document. The resulting 177-page document, was released in November.

The plan builds upon and links existing documents covering specific areas of portfolio responsibility:

- NSW Greenhouse Plan
- 2006 Metropolitan Water Plan
- Action for Air - 2006 Update
- City of Cities: A Plan for Sydney's Future (Planning)
- State Infrastructure Strategy
- NSW: A New Direction for Mental Health
- Two Ways Together (Aboriginal Affairs)
- Stronger Together (Disability Services)

The State Plan foreshadows new documents covering:

- Health
- Urban Transport
- Innovation Strategy
- Renewable Energy

== Advertising costs ==
The release of the plan came a few months before a state election. Advertising for the plan's development cost $2.6 million, on top of the $1.9 million spent developing the plan itself.

Then-Opposition leader Peter Debnam labelled the advertising "an outrageous waste of taxpayer funds," and suggested that, "This money should be charged back to the Labor Party."

The Premier, Morris Iemma, defended the expense:

"The NSW State Plan is a document that has been developed by the NSW public. It's a plan that represents their hopes and aspirations for the next 10 years. More than 4000 people right across the state actively contributed to its creation, people from all walks of life. It is therefore appropriate that the Government communicates to the people what is in the plan."
