= Division of Barton =

Australian federal electoral division

Coordinates: 33.956°S 151.129°E

Barton Australian House of Representatives Division
- Interactive map of electorate boundaries from the 2025 federal election
- Created: 1922
- MP: Ash Ambihaipahar
- Party: Labor
- Namesake: Sir Edmund Barton
- Electors: 120,825 (2025)
- Area: 42 km^{2} (16.2 sq mi)
- Demographic: Inner metropolitan
Electorates around Barton:
Watson	Grayndler	Grayndler
Banks	Barton	Kingsford Smith
Banks	Cook	Kingsford Smith

The Division of Barton is an Australian electoral division in the state of New South Wales. It is located in the inner south west of Sydney. It is currently represented by Labor MP Ash Ambihaipahar.

== History ==
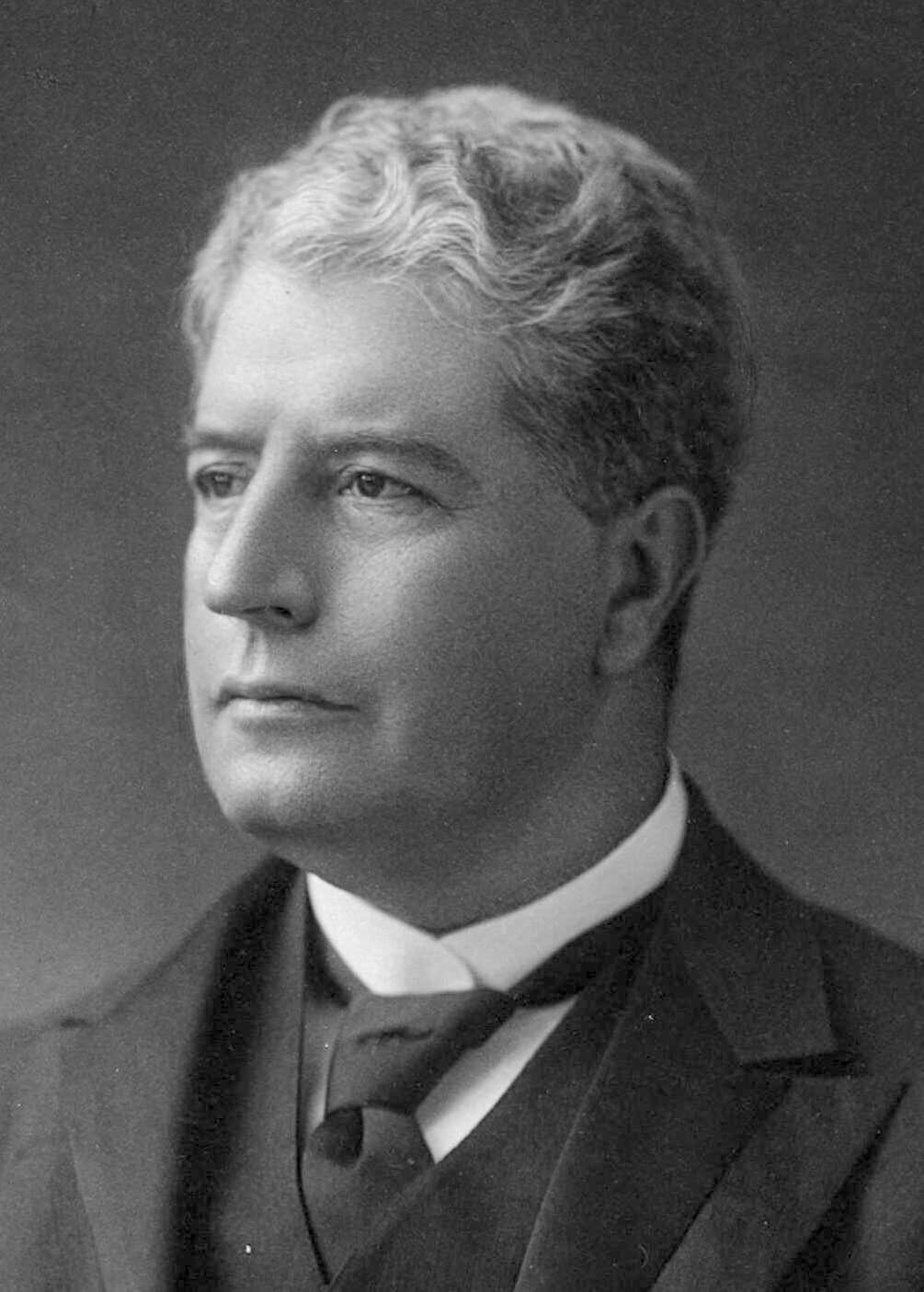
Sir Edmund Barton, the division's namesake

The division was created in 1922 and is named for Sir Edmund Barton, the first Prime Minister of Australia. For much of its history, Barton has been a marginal seat, held by the Australian Labor Party for most of the time after 1940, but won by the Liberals (or their predecessors) at "high-tide" elections.

Barton's most prominent member has been Dr H. V. Evatt, who was Leader of the Labor Party between 1951 and 1960. After seeing his majority more than halved in 1949, and nearly being defeated in 1951 and 1955, he transferred to the safe seat of Hunter in 1958. A former minister in the Hawke and Keating ministries, Gary Punch, held the seat for Labor between 1983 and 1996. Robert McClelland, Attorney-General in the Rudd and Gillard governments, held the seat for Labor between 1996 and 2013.

Nickolas Varvaris won the seat for the Liberals at the 2013 federal election, achieving a swing of 7.2 points to finish with a two-party-preferred vote of just 50.3 percent, which made Barton the Coalition government's most marginal seat, but was defeated in 2016 by Labor's former state deputy opposition leader Linda Burney, who held it until her retirement at the 2025 election, when it was won by Ash Ambihaipahar, also Labor.

The Division of Barton is linked to one of the more unusual episodes in Australian politics. The first member for Barton, Labor's Frederick McDonald, disappeared after his 1925 defeat by Nationalist Thomas Ley, and it is now believed that Ley had him murdered. After being found guilty of an unrelated murder in England in 1947, Ley was declared insane and died in Broadmoor Asylum four months later.

== Boundaries ==
The division has always been based in the inner southern suburbs of Sydney. It has traditionally been bordered to the east by Botany Bay, but, as of 2025, the coastal strip has been part of Kingsford Smith. It currently includes the suburbs of Allawah, Arncliffe, Banksia, Bardwell Park, Bardwell Valley, Beverley Park, Bexley, Bexley North, Carlton, Clemton Park, Earlwood, Kingsgrove, Kogarah, Kogarah Bay, Rockdale, Turrella, Undercliffe, and Wolli Creek; as well as parts of Belmore, Beverly Hills, Campsie, Canterbury, Hurstville, Ramsgate, Roselands and Penshurst.

Since 1984, federal electoral division boundaries in Australia have been determined at redistributions by a redistribution committee appointed by the Australian Electoral Commission. Redistributions occur for the boundaries of divisions in a particular state, and they occur every seven years, or sooner if a state's representation entitlement changes or when divisions of a state are malapportioned.

== Demographics ==
2021 Australian census
Ancestry
Response	Barton	NSW	Australia
Chinese	19.0%	7.2%	5.5%
Australian	12.5%	29.8%	33.0%
Greek	9.6%	1.8%	1.7%
Lebanese	6.1%	2.2%	1.0%
Country of birth
Response	Barton	NSW	Australia
Australia	45.8%	65.4%	66.9%
China	9.7%	3.1%	2.2%
Nepal	4.7%	0.8%	0.5%
Greece	3.0%	0.4%	0.4%
Lebanon	2.4%	0.8%	0.3%
Philippines	2.0%	1.3%	1.2%
Religious affiliation
Response	Barton	NSW	Australia
No religion	28.9%	32.8%	38.4%
Catholicism	19.5%	22.4%	20.0%
Eastern Orthodoxy	12.8%	2.5%	2.1%
Islam	8.2%	4.3%	3.2%
Language spoken at home
English	37.1%	67.6%	72.0%
Mandarin	9.2%	3.4%	2.7%
Greek	7.3%	1.0%	0.9%
Arabic	6.8%	2.8%	1.4%
Cantonese	6.0%	1.8%	1.2%
Nepali	4.7%	0.8%	0.5%

== Members ==
Image	Member	Party	Term	Notes
	Frederick McDonald (1872–1926)	Labor	16 December 1922 – 14 November 1925	Lost seat
	Thomas Ley (1880–1947)	Nationalist	14 November 1925 – 17 November 1928	Previously held the New South Wales Legislative Assembly seat of St George. Lost seat
	James Tully (1877–1962)	Labor	17 November 1928 – 19 December 1931	Lost seat
	Albert Lane (1873–1950)	United Australia	19 December 1931 – 21 September 1940	Previously held the New South Wales Legislative Assembly seat of Balmain. Lost seat
	Dr. H.V. Evatt (1894–1965)	Labor	21 September 1940 – 22 November 1958	Previously held the New South Wales Legislative Assembly seat of Balmain. Served as minister under Curtin, Forde and Chifley. Served as deputy prime minister under Chifley. under Served as Opposition Leader from 1951 to 1960. Transferred to the Division of Hunter
	Len Reynolds (1923–1980)	Labor	22 November 1958 – 26 November 1966	Lost seat
	Bill Arthur (1918–1982)	Liberal	26 November 1966 – 25 October 1969	Lost seat
	Len Reynolds (1923–1980)	Labor	25 October 1969 – 11 November 1975	Retired
	Jim Bradfield (1933–1989)	Liberal	13 December 1975 – 5 March 1983	Lost seat
	Gary Punch (1957–)	Labor	5 March 1983 – 29 January 1996	Served as minister under Hawke and Keating. Retired
	Robert McClelland (1958–)	Labor	2 March 1996 – 5 August 2013	Served as minister under Rudd and Gillard. Retired
	Nickolas Varvaris (1974–)	Liberal	7 September 2013 – 2 July 2016	Lost seat
	Linda Burney (1957–)	Labor	2 July 2016 – 28 March 2025	Previously held the New South Wales Legislative Assembly seat of Canterbury. Served as minister under Albanese. Retired
	Ash Ambihaipahar (1987–)	Labor	3 May 2025 – present	Incumbent

== Election results ==
2025 Australian federal election: Barton
Party	Candidate	Votes	%	±%
Labor	Ash Ambihaipahar	47,098	47.12	−0.87
Liberal	Fiona Douskou	24,162	24.17	−5.23
Greens	Manal Bahsa	15,885	15.89	+4.88
One Nation	Christos Nicolis	5,573	5.58	+0.72
Trumpet of Patriots	Thomas Pambris	3,814	3.82	+3.82
Libertarian	Vinay Kolhatkar	3,419	3.42	+3.31
Total formal votes		99,951	90.69	−1.35
Informal votes		10,256	9.31	+1.35
Turnout		110,207	91.26	+1.94
Two-party-preferred result
Labor	Ash Ambihaipahar	65,971	66.00	+4.01
Liberal	Fiona Douskou	33,980	34.00	−4.01
Labor hold		Swing	+4.01	

Alluvial diagram illustrating the full distribution of preferences in the seat of Barton for the 2025 Federal Election
