= List of Victorian Supreme Court cases =

This is a select list of cases decided by the Supreme Court of Victoria.

- Killing of Rekiah O'Donnell
- R v Cogdon - Supreme Court, 1950 - successful defense of defence (non-insane) automatism against homicide charge
- R v Davidson - Supreme Court, 1969 - also known as the Menhennitt ruling, regarding the legality of abortions.
- R v Thomas - Court of Criminal Appeal, 2006 - a confession obtained under torture was not admissible as evidence in the trial of "Jihad Jack" Joseph Thomas.
- Goldie Marketing Pty Ltd v Financial Ombudsman Services Ltd - Supreme Court, 2015 - involved presentation of misleading file notes in the discovery phase.
- Port of Melbourne Authority v Anshun Pty Ltd - Supreme Court 1980 upheld on appeal to the Full Court and the High Court of Australia. The unexplained failure to plead an indemnity in defence to the claim for contribution meant it could not be raised in later proceedings.
- R v ACR Roofing Pty Ltd - A 2004 case involving the death of a construction worker.

== See also ==
- Lists of case law

== Bibliography ==
- Victorian Reports
- John Burnett Box, George Briscoe Kerferd. A Digest of the Cases Decided in the Supreme Court of Victoria, from AD 1846 to AD 1871. Charles F Maxwell. 1871.
- George Wilson Waterhouse, Francis William Edmondson. A Digest of Reported Cases in the Supreme Court, Court of Insolvency, and the Courts of Mines and Vice-Admiralty of the Colony of Victoria, from 1861 to 1885. C F Maxwell. 1886. Google Books.
- James Grattan Eagleson, J S Wasley. A Digest of Reported Cases in the Supreme Court, Court of Insolvency, and the Courts of Mines of the Colony of Victoria: From 1885 to 1890. C F Maxwell. 1893.
- James Gratten Eagleson. Digest of Criminal Cases as Decided in the Supreme Court of Victoria & on Appeal Therefrom to the Privy Council. 1899.
- James Grattan Eagleson, William Alexander Sanderson, Bernard O'Dowd. A Digest of Australasian Mining Cases: As Decided in the Supreme Courts of Victoria, New South Wales, Queensland, South Australia, and New Zealand, and on Appeal Therefrom to the Privy Council. CF Maxwell. 1897.
