= Melbourne Law School =

Graduate school of the University of Melbourne

Coordinates: 37°48′09″S 144°57′36″E

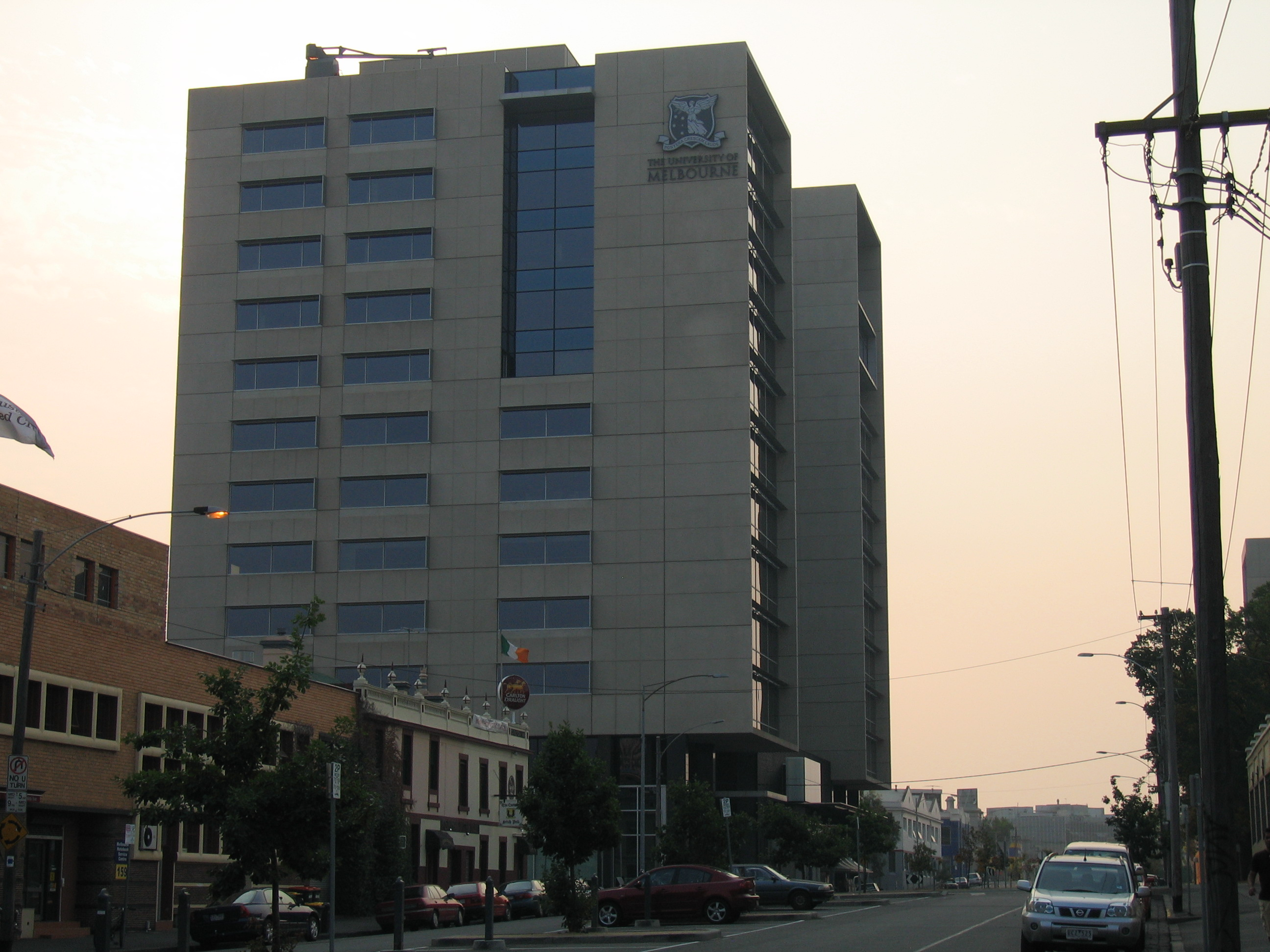
- Law School Building
- Motto: Postera Crescam Laude
- Parent school: University of Melbourne
- Established: 1857
- School type: Public law school
- Dean: Michelle Foster
- Location: Carlton, Victoria, Australia
- Website: www.law.unimelb.edu.au

Melbourne Law School is one of the professional graduate schools of the University of Melbourne. Located in Carlton, Victoria, Melbourne Law School is Australia's oldest law school, and offers J.D., LL.M, Ph.D, and LL.D degrees. In 2021–22, THE World University Rankings ranked the law school as 5th best in the world and first both in Australia and Asia-Pacific.

Alumni of Melbourne Law School include four prime ministers of Australia, three governors-general, four chief justices of Australia and thirteen Commonwealth attorneys-general, a current judge of the International Court of Justice, a current justice of the High Court of Australia, the current chief justice of the Family Court of Australia, the current governor of Victoria, the current solicitor-general of Australia, the current president of the Australian Human Rights Commission, the current Victorian Equal Opportunity and Human Rights Commissioner and the current chairwoman of the Victorian Bar Council.

Established in 1857, Melbourne Law School initially offered LL.B degrees for those seeking a first degree in law. However, in 2007 Melbourne Law School ceased accepting students into this program and instead offered only a J.D. Admission to Melbourne Law School is competitive, with applicants typically requiring a distinction average or higher in their undergraduate degree for admission to its J.D. program. Applicants seeking to study the LL.M program require high results in their undergraduate law studies.

Melbourne Law School publishes a number of academic journals, including the Melbourne University Law Review, the Melbourne Journal of International Law and the Australian Journal of Labour Law. Melbourne Law School is host to a number of research centres and institutes, specialising in a wide variety of legal fields. It also offers subjects taught overseas and partner programs with leading international law schools. The Law Library of Melbourne Law School encompasses three floors offering access to a variety of resources including periodicals and law journals. Students can participate in a number of organisations designed to enrich student life.

== History ==
There was no organised legal education in Australia until the start of lectures at Melbourne Law School in 1857. Prior to this, the majority of common-law lawyers had never attended university. A small proportion of people in the United States, England and her colonies, including Australia at the time, chose to study law in college before entering the legal profession. Like many of its peers, the University of Melbourne did not teach law at its inception in 1855, although by the second year of teaching enrolments at the institution were so low that teaching in the fields of law and medicine was suggested in order to attract students. Compared to sciences that needed expensive equipment, law could be taught more affordably and draw in a useful number of students.

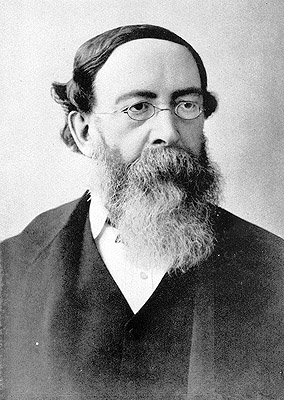
William Hearn, first dean from 1873 to 1889

New admission roles created by the Supreme Court of Victoria gave prospective lawyers the choice between completing an exam administered by the Court, or completing a course of study at Melbourne Law School, with the thirty-three law students of 1857 more than doubling total enrolments at the university.

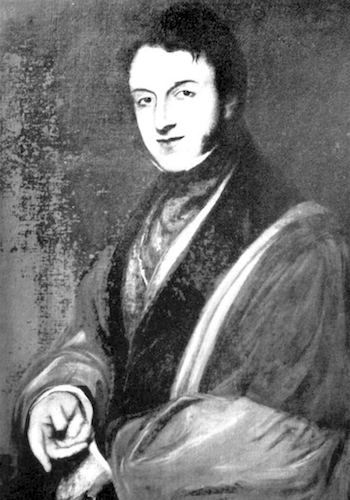
Richard Clarke Sewell

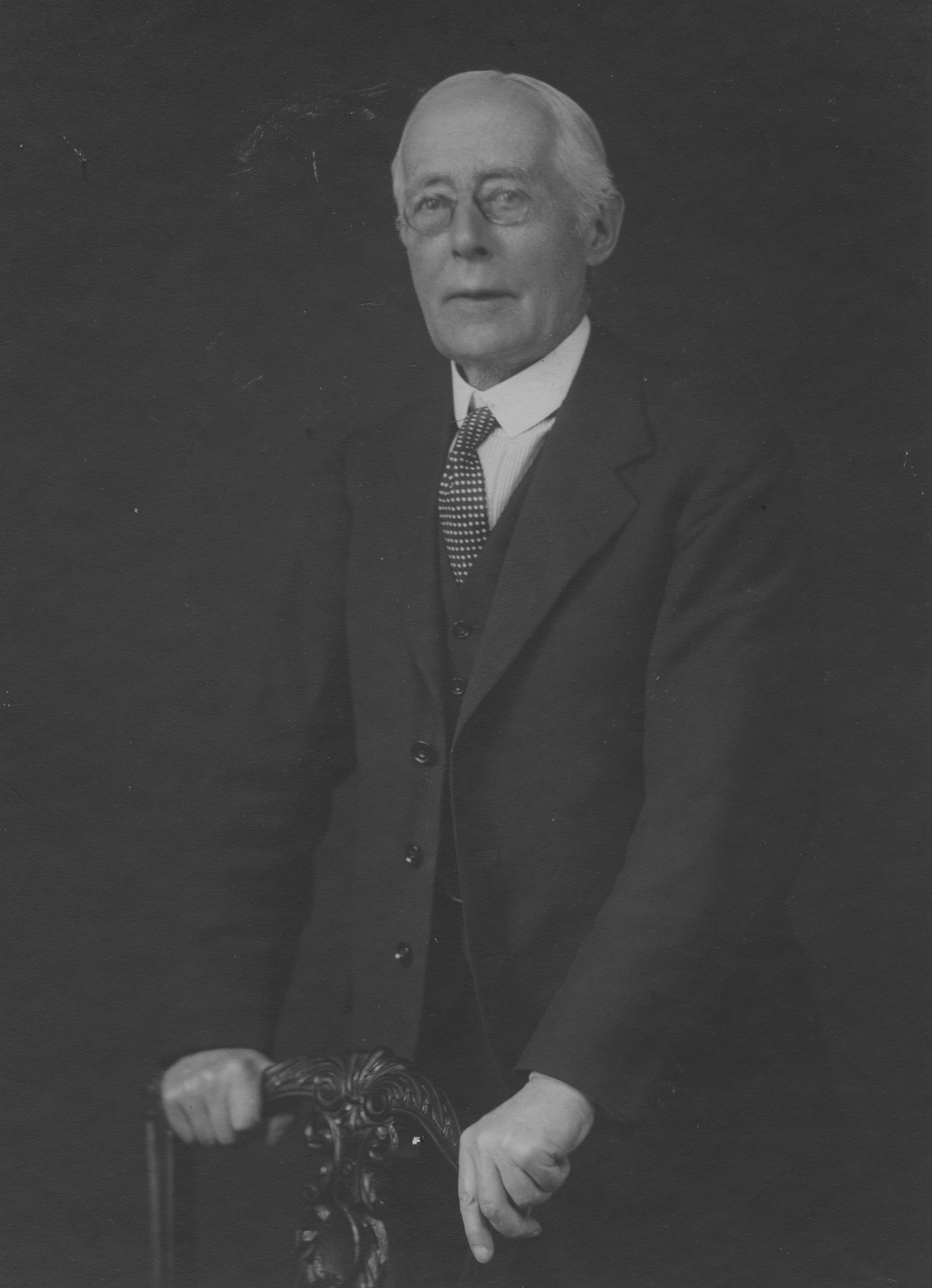
Edward Jenks, second dean from 1889 to 1892

Richard Clarke Sewell was the first appointed lecturer in law. Sewell was educated and qualified; however, he was eventually found to be unsuitable for the role to which he was appointed. Born in England, Sewell had twelve siblings. His father was a solicitor. Sewell was educated at Winchester and then Oxford University, becoming a fellow of Magdalen College and graduating with a doctorate in civil law. He came to Victoria in 1855, although his reason for doing so is unclear. He was admitted to the Victorian bar, where he practiced criminal law. After Sewell was hired, the new course's outline was finalised, and he may have shared part of the design credit. The course started with an encyclopaedic introduction and was split into terms and years rather than subjects. Sewell struggled with the commitments of teaching, with his initial lectures bland and poorly received by students. Attendance started to fall, and Sewell resigned.

The first students studied for a certificate that, with practical training, qualified them for admission to legal practice. In 1860 they were given the additional option of studying for a degree.

Melbourne Law School was expanded and reorganised in 1873, becoming the Faculty of Law. In 1873, William Hearn was appointed as the first dean of Melbourne Law School, lecturing in subjects such as constitutional law. Hearn would go on to be elected to the Victorian Legislative Council for Central Province.

Sir William Harrison Moore was appointed as the third dean of Melbourne Law School, succeeding Edward Jenks. Moore was somewhat controversial as a new dean, proposing that Roman law (a strong influence on the civil law system predominant in Europe, but less important to the common law system in Australia) no longer be taught at the university, and the removal of legal procedure as a separate undergraduate course.

The first woman to enrol at Melbourne Law School was Flos Greig in 1897. Greig would graduate in 1903, the first woman in Victoria to do so, and only the second in the country, after Ada Evans who graduated the previous year from the University of Sydney. Greig received third-class honours for her degree, placing her second in her year level.

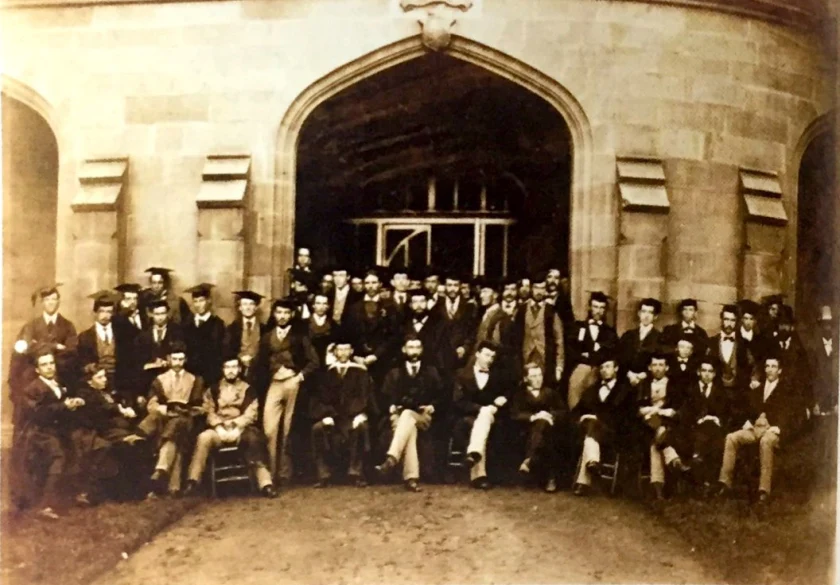
Melbourne Law School staff and students in the 1870's

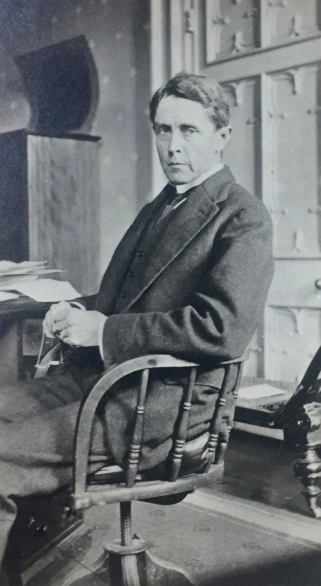
William Harrison Moore, third dean from 1892 to 1927

Melbourne Law School under Moore opened its doors to practising lawyers in addition to academics, visiting lecturers in the year of 1908 including people such as High Court Justice H. B. Higgins, Chief Justice of Victoria Sir John Madden, and judge of the Supreme Court of Victoria Leo Cussen. The school, located then in what is now known as the "Old Law" building, struggled for room and resources, Moore having to contribute some of his personal library for the use of students, and some lectures having to be held in the Supreme Court building in the city.

The school continued to grow throughout the 19th and 20th centuries, and underwent a major transformation with the appointment of Sir Zelman Cowen as dean in 1951. Sir Zelman shaped Melbourne Law School after the United States model, rather than the British model that is common in Australia. Sir Zelman reformed teaching, research and academic recruitment. Under his stewardship, full-time academics came to dominate teaching, instead of part-time practitioners. Many prominent international academics were invited to study at the school, and many Australians were given the opportunity to study abroad.

In 2007, Melbourne Law School accepted its last cohort of LL.B students. From 2008 the only degree offered by Melbourne Law School qualifying for legal practice is the graduate-entry JD. This change to an entirely graduate law school is consistent with university-wide changes occurring under Vice-Chancellor Glyn Davis's Melbourne Model, although Melbourne Law School does offer some subjects to the university's undergraduate students (known as 'breadth' subjects).

== Admissions ==
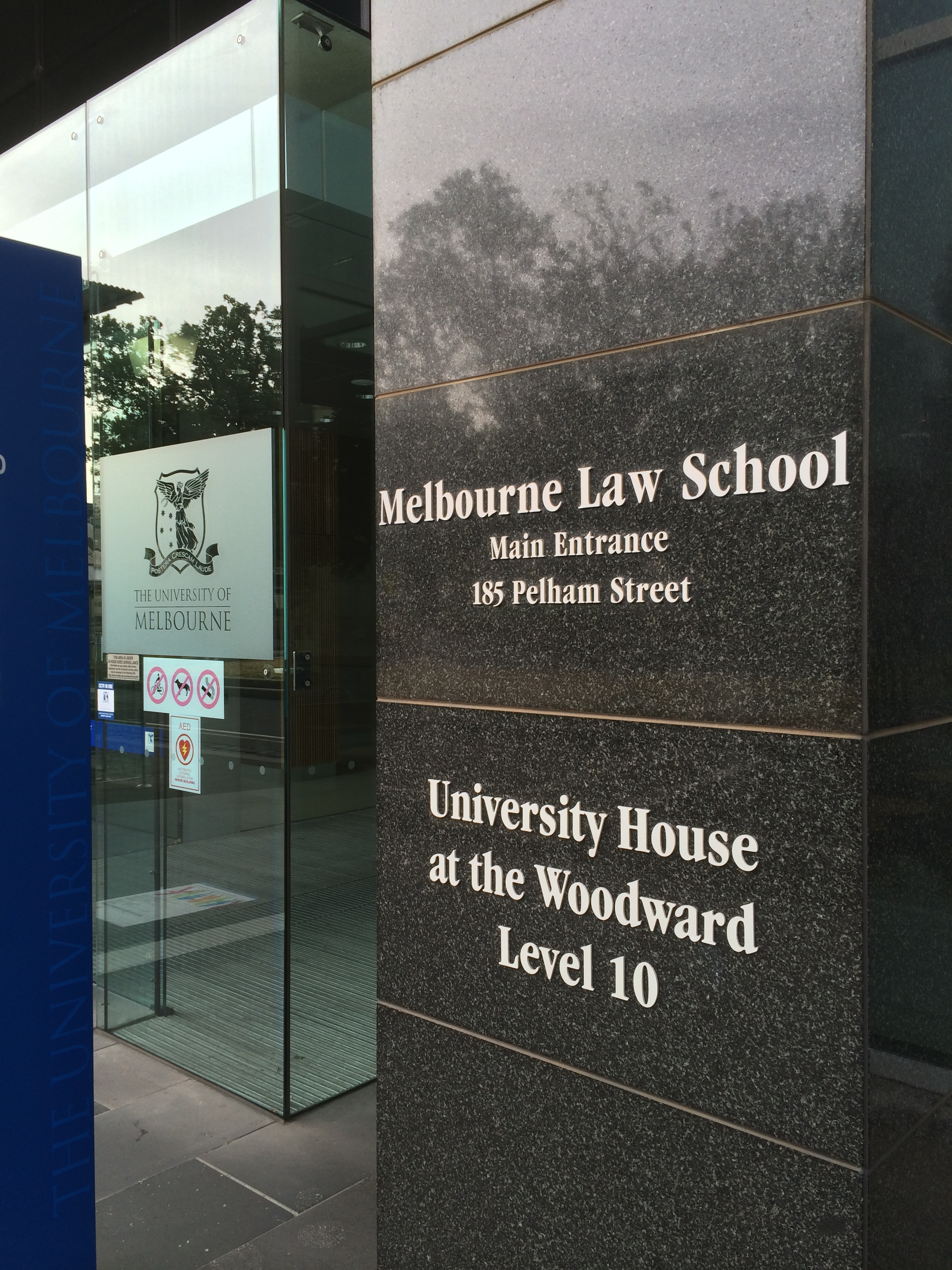
Main Entrance to Melbourne Law School

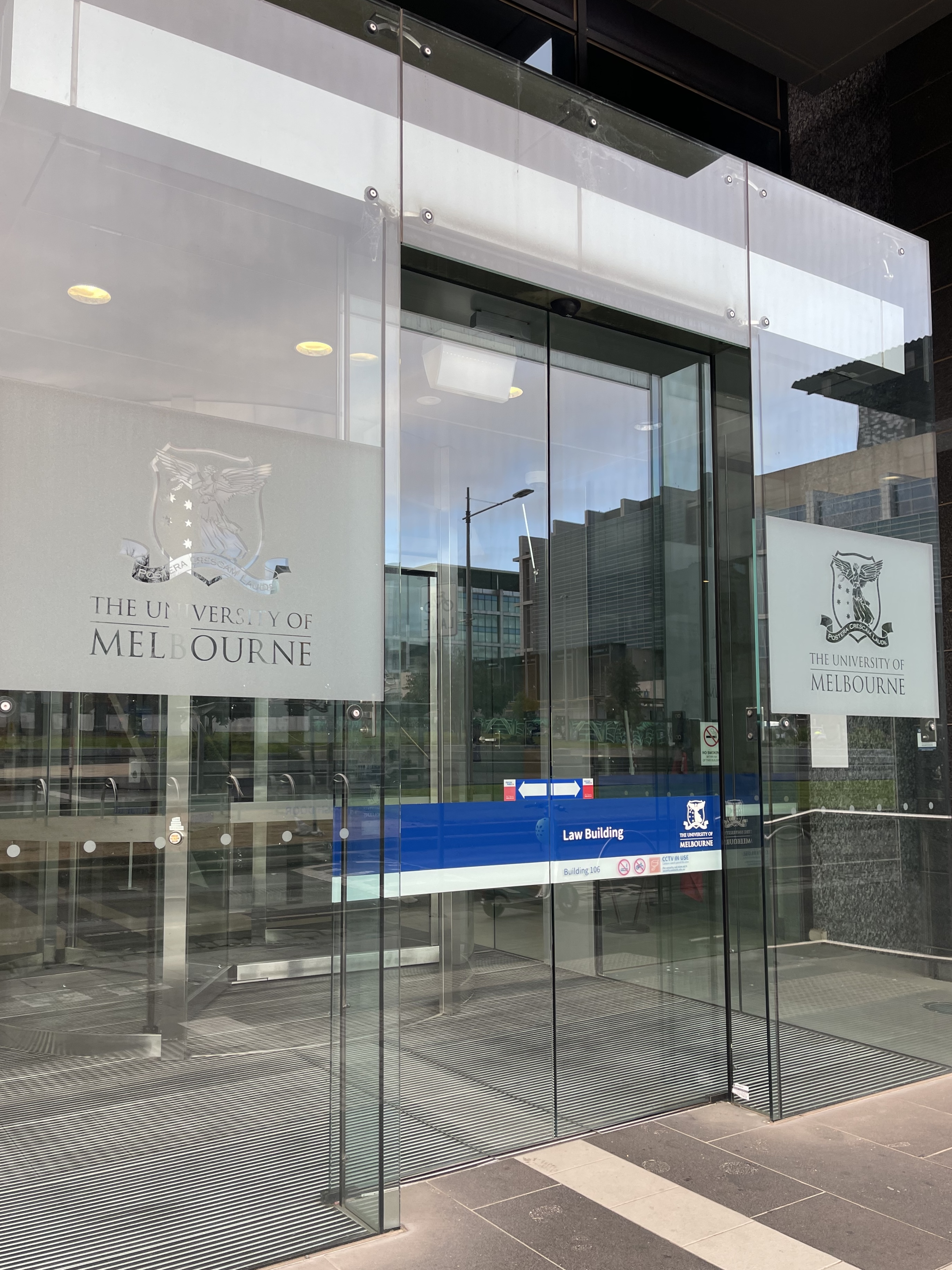
East Entry

=== Prior tertiary performance ===
Applicants for the Juris Doctor program require a three-year bachelor's degree or equivalent. The performance of an applicant in this degree and any previous tertiary study is assessed. For a competitive application, the weighted average mark (WAM) across tertiary studies must be generally at least 70%. The requirements are based on the academic grading system in Australia, which means students must typically achieve the grade of Distinction throughout their studies in order to be admitted, or the equivalent of a 3.5 GPA or above when converting for the academic grading system used in the United States.

=== Law school admissions test ===
The school previously required the law school admissions test (LSAT) be sat, with the results considered in deciding whether to admit an applicant. In 2022, the school announced the LSAT would no longer be required. The board of admissions removed the requirement due to the impact of COVID-19 on students, and initially planned to reinstate the requirement once restrictions were eased. However, the school permanently removed the LSAT as doing so increased diversity and access to the program while maintaining strong academic standards. The process of removing the LSAT requirement was criticised by the University of Melbourne Student Union, noting the WAM requirement remained high and "severe lack of organisation displayed by the School" in not providing students sufficient notice or detail surrounding the decision.

=== Costs ===
Students studying the J.D. program do so in either a Commonwealth Supported Place or full-fee paying place. Fees for students in a Commonwealth Supported Place were $15,142 per year in 2023, while fees for full-fee paying students were $42,784 per year. Eligible students in either fee type may defer payment of tuition through the Higher Education Loan Program.

== Academics ==
=== Research centres ===
Melbourne Law School is host to a number of research centres and institutes, specialising in a wide variety of legal fields:

- Asian Law Centre
- Centre for Artificial Intelligence and Digital Ethics
- Centre for Comparative Constitutional Studies
- Centre for Corporate Law
- Centre for Employment and Labour Relations Law
- Centre for Indonesian Law, Islam and Society
- Centre for Media and Communications Law
- Centre for Resources, Energy and Environmental Law
- Competition Law and Economics Network
- Electoral Regulation Research Network
- Health Law and Ethics Network
- Institute for International Law and Humanities
- Intellectual Property Research Institute of Australia
- Melbourne Climate Futures
- Obligations Group
- Peter McMullin Centre on Statelessness
- Tax Group

=== Mooting ===
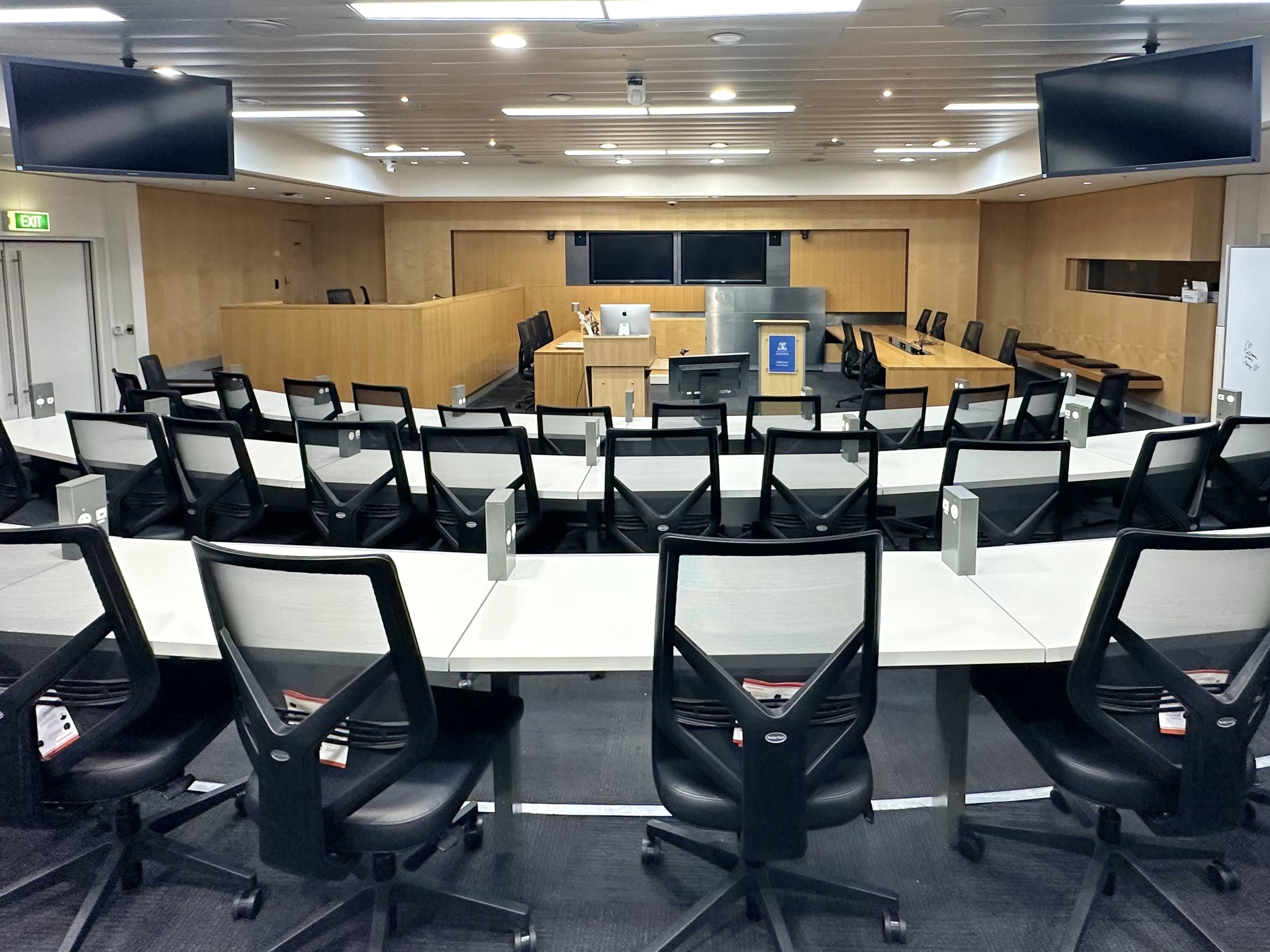
Moot Court at Melbourne Law School

Mooting at Melbourne Law School was made mandatory in 1958. Mooting continues to be mandated as assessment at Melbourne Law School for some core J.D. subjects, such as constitutional law, and is widely pursued by the student body in both internal and external moot court competitions. Melbourne Law School's internal moot court competition takes place in Melbourne Law School's purpose-built moot court. It is organised and run each year by the Melbourne University Law Students' Society, and is currently sponsored by a number of commercial law firms. Melbourne Law School students have achieved success in multiple international moot court competitions. Teams from Melbourne Law School have won the Philip C. Jessup International Law Moot Court Competition and the ELSA Moot Court Competition three times, and in 2012 a team from Melbourne Law School won the IASLA Space Law Moot Court Competition. A Melbourne Law School team also won the inaugural Victorian Championship Moot in 2013.

=== External programs ===
Melbourne Law School offers subjects taught in New York City, Washington, D.C., Delhi, Shanghai and Geneva, and has partner programs with many of the world's leading law schools, including University of Virginia School of Law, Georgetown University Law Center, University of Toronto Faculty of Law, and the National University of Singapore Faculty of Law. Melbourne Law School is a founding member of the Center for Transnational Legal Studies in London, and contributes both staff and students to the Center every year. Additionally, Melbourne Law School has dual degree arrangements with the University of Oxford, the University of Cambridge, the National University of Singapore Faculty of Law, New York University School of Law, and the University of British Columbia's Peter A. Allard School of Law.

=== Law library ===
The law library is located on levels 3, 4 and 5 of Melbourne Law School at the Parkville Campus of the university. The law library offers research tools that include authorised law reports, Australian Case Citator Comparison, deep linking information, keeping up to date in law, legal abbreviations, legal citation style guides, reference management, style guides for authors, and theses advice. The catalogue of books at the library encompasses new books, a rare book collection, past exams and readings online, and a digital repository.

== Publications ==
=== Melbourne University Law Review ===

Students of the JD program are involved in preparing and publishing the Melbourne University Law Review, a triannual law journal covering all areas of law. It is one of two student-run law journals at the University of Melbourne. Students who have completed at least one semester of law are eligible to apply for membership of the editorial board. Applicants are assessed on the basis of their performance in a practical exercise, academic aptitude, proofreading skills, editing skills and enthusiasm. The 2025 editors-in-chief are Angela Stevens, Selina Li and Gabriel Dartnell.

Occasionally, the journal produces a symposium issue devoted to a particular aspect of law. Past symposium issues have focused on the centenary of the federation of Australia, contemporary human rights in Australia, and tort law. The Review's alumni include two High Court Justices, three Solicitors-General, five Federal Court judges and at least six Supreme Court judges.

=== Australian Journal of Labour Law ===
The Australian Journal of Labour Law is a triannual peer-reviewed law journal that was established in 1968. It is published by LexisNexis in collaboration with the Centre For Employment and Labour Relations Law within Melbourne Law School. It covers Australian labour law. The editors-in-chief are Andrew Stewart of the University of Adelaide, John Howe of the University of Melbourne, and Shae McCrystal of the University of Sydney. The journal is abstracted and indexed in EBSCO databases.

=== Melbourne Journal of International Law ===
The Melbourne Journal of International Law ('MJIL') is a biannual peer-reviewed law review published by Melbourne Law School covering all areas of public and private international law. It was established in 2000. MJIL is edited and managed by an editorial board of around 70 Melbourne Law School studentsl, and overseen by an advisory board. The 2022 Editors are Matthew Carlei, Tegan Evans and Nicholas Hui.

Additional journals published by Melbourne Law School include the Australian Journal of Asian Law (in conjunction with the Australian National University and the University of Washington), and Media and Arts Law Review. Melbourne Law School publishes the Australian Guide to Legal Citation, the most widely followed authority for legal citation formats in Australia. Melbourne Law School students also produce a newspaper, De Minimis, and a magazine, "Purely Dicta".

== Rankings ==
Melbourne Law School has been consistently ranked as the top law school in Australia. Melbourne Law School has been consistently ranked among the top law schools in the world.

	2013	2014	2015	2016	2017	2018	2019	2020	2021	2022	2023	2024	2025
QS Ranking by Subject (Law)	5th	8th	8th	8th	11th	8th	6th	10th	11th	12th	11th	10th	13th
T.H.E. Ranking by Subject (Law)	NA	NA	NA	NA	NA	7th	10th	12th	11th	5th	7th	8th	11th

== Student organisations ==
Several student organisations are associated with Melbourne Law School.

Emblem of the Melbourne University Law School Society

=== Melbourne Law Student Society ===
The Melbourne University Law Students' Society represents all law students at the Melbourne Law School. The society was originally known as the Law Clerk's Society. Unlike today, members used to comprise primarily of students working as an articled clerk in a law firm. By the 1950s, most members of the society were fulltime students and became based on campus. Today the society is a student club and consists of approximately one hundred students who on a volunteer basis deliver programs and events. The 2026-2027 president is Carlos Lagos.

=== Global Law Students Association ===
The Global Law Students Association (GLSA), which focuses on international legal issues, careers and provides additional support for international students at Melbourne Law School.

=== Melbourne China Law Society ===
The Melbourne China Law Society, facilitates the comparative study of Chinese, Hong Kong and Australian law, as well as providing Mandarin language training to Melbourne Law School students.

=== Melbourne Law Masters Student Association ===
The Melbourne Law Masters Student Association (MLMSA) represents the collective interests of all MLM (Melbourne Law Masters) students within Melbourne Law School.

== Deans ==
Below is a list of the deans of Melbourne Law School from 1873 to the present:

- 1873–1888 William Hearn
- 1889–1892 Edward Jenks
- 1893–1927 William Harrison Moore
- 1928–1936 Kenneth Bailey
- 1937–1937 George Paton
- 1938–1942 Kenneth Bailey
- 1943–1951 George Paton
- 1951–1963 Zelman Cowen
- 1964–1964 Harold Ford
- 1964–1966 Zelman Cowen
- 1967–1973 Harold Ford
- 1973–1977 Sandford Clark
- 1978–1983 Colin Howard
- 1984–1986 Mark Weinberg
- 1986–1988 Harold Luntz
- 1989–2002 Michael Crommelin
- 2002–2003 Ian Ramsay
- 2003–2007 Michael Crommelin
- 2008–2009 James Hathaway
- 2010–2011 Michael Crommelin
- 2011–2017 Carolyn Evans
- 2017–2018 Jenny Morgan
- 2018–2022 Pip Nicholson
- 2022–2024 Matthew Harding
- 2024–Present Michelle Foster

== Notable alumni ==
Alfred Deakin, the 2nd prime minister of Australia, Sir Robert Menzies, the 12th prime minister of Australia, Harold Holt, the 17th prime minister of Australia, and Julia Gillard, the 27th prime minister of Australia, all graduated from Melbourne Law School. Three governors-general and at least 13 attorneys-general have also graduated from Melbourne Law School, including Gareth Evans, Nicola Roxon and Mark Dreyfus.

Foreign politicians who attended Melbourne Law School include Neri Javier Colmenares, a member of the House of Representatives of the Philippines, Adnan Buyung Nasution, member of the Presidential Advisory Council of the Republic of Indonesia and Dame Meg Taylor, former ambassador of Papua New Guinea to the United States and former secretary general of the Pacific Islands Forum Secretariat

Four Melbourne Law School graduates have served as Chief Justice of Australia. This number includes Sir Owen Dixon, one of Australia's most eminent jurists, and Sir Isaac Isaacs, the first Jewish chief justice. Geoffrey Nettle, a current justice of the High Court of Australia, graduated from Melbourne Law School. In addition, two Melbourne Law School graduates have served on the International Court of Justice: Hsu Mo and Hilary Charlesworth.

Francis Gurry, the director general of the World Intellectual Property Organization, Gillian Triggs, the president of the Australian Human Rights Commission, and Samuel Pisar, the UNESCO special envoy for Holocaust education, all graduated from Melbourne Law School.

Melbourne Law School graduates in the business world include James P. Gorman, chairman and CEO of Morgan Stanley. Renowned lawyer, Leon Zwier, graduated from Melbourne Law School. Legal academics who graduated from Melbourne Law School include Sir David Derham, the founding dean of Monash Law School, Greg Craven, the vice-chancellor of the Australian Catholic University, and Sir John Monash, a vice-chancellor of the University of Melbourne and decorated World War I general.

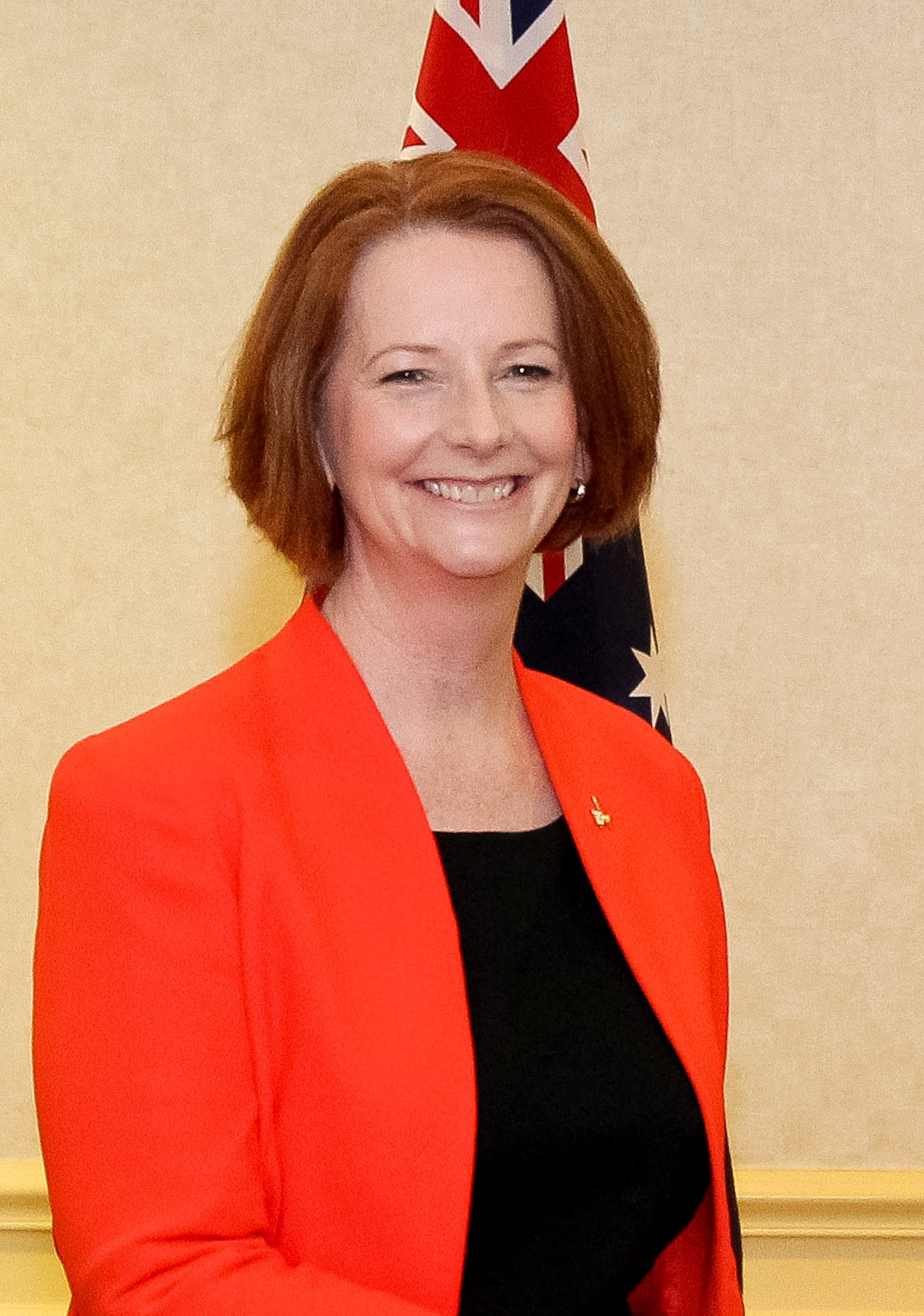
Former Prime Minister Julia Gillard

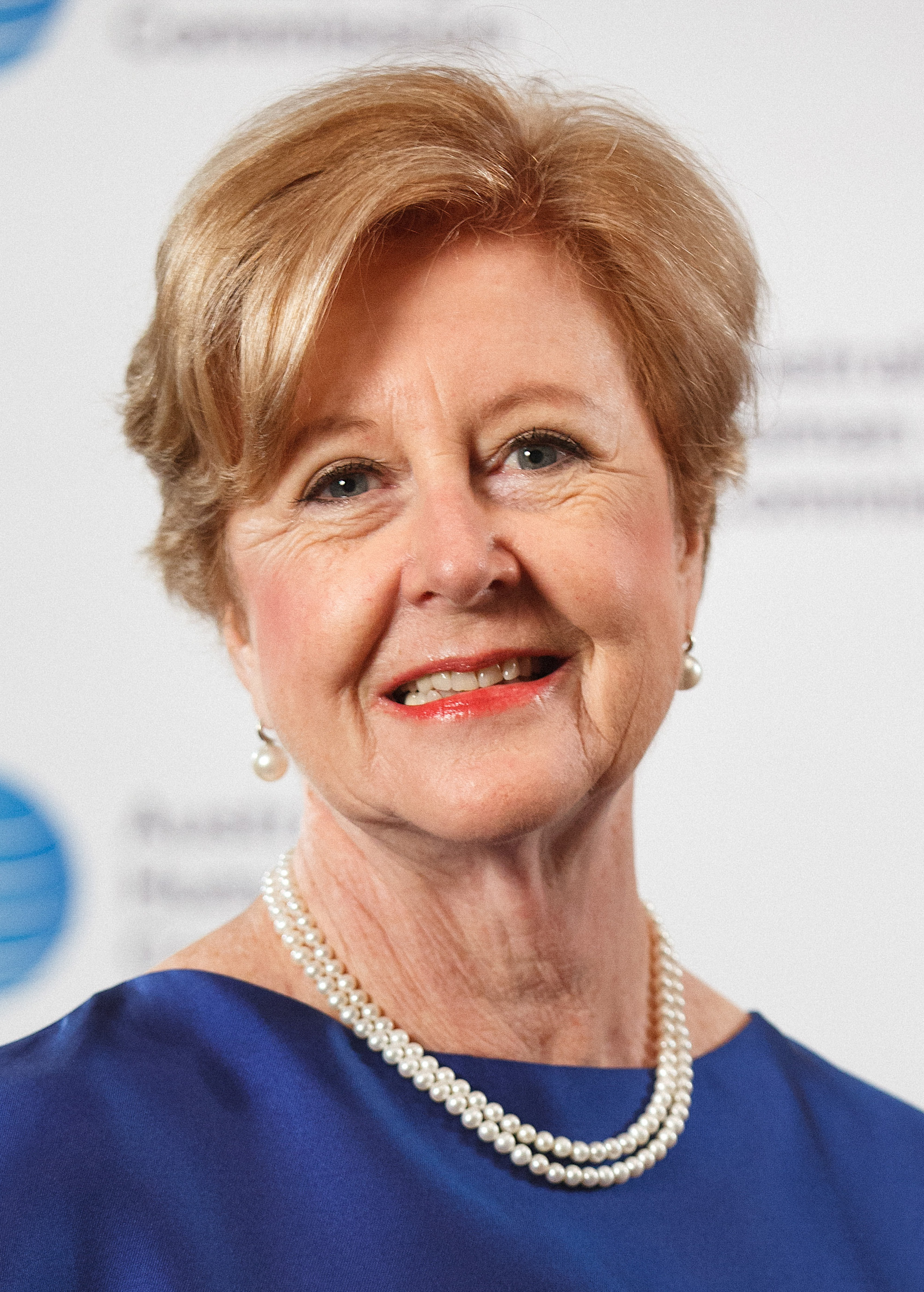
Professor Gillian Triggs

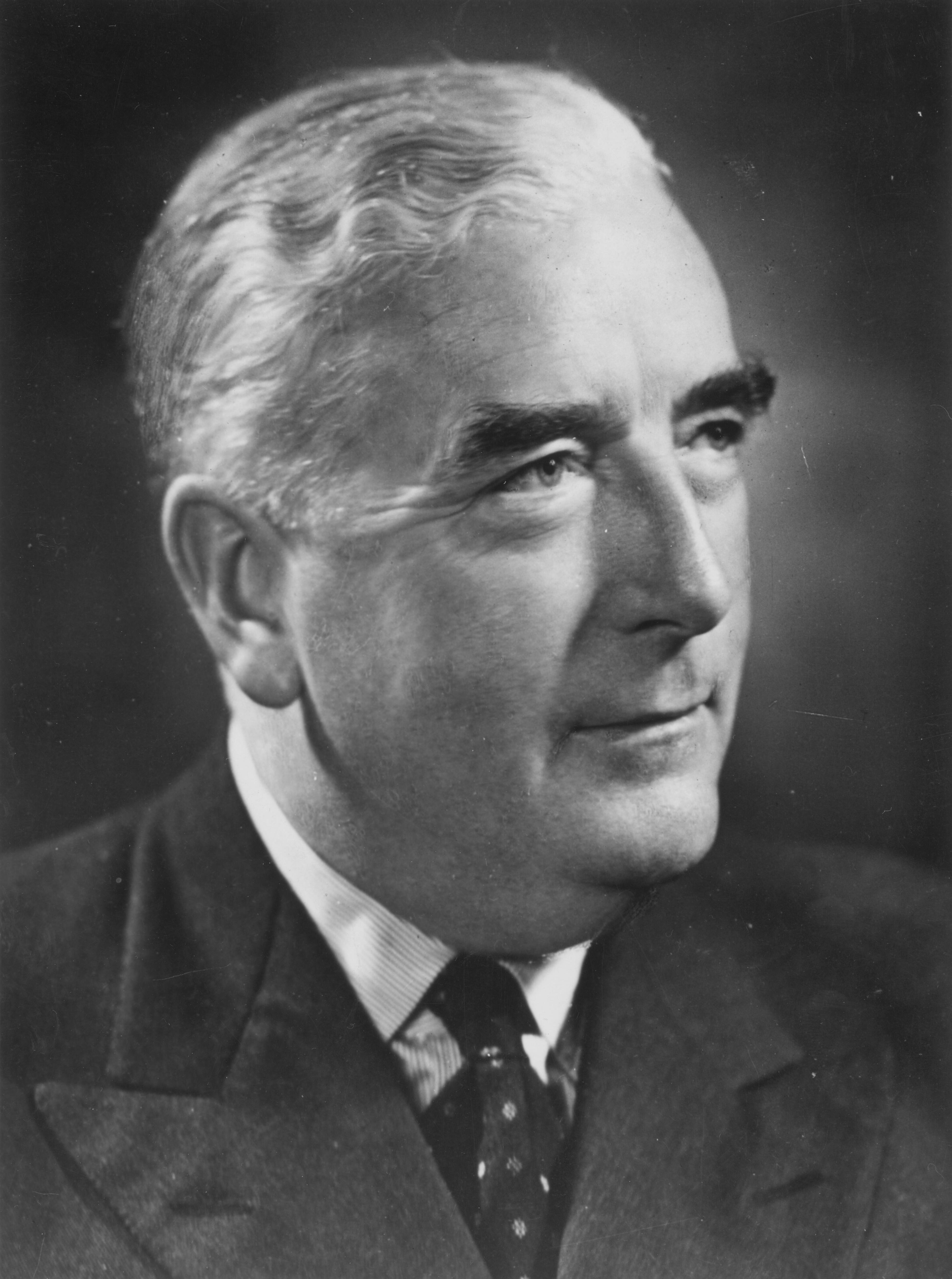
Former Prime Minister Robert Menzies
