= R v ACR Roofing Pty Ltd =

2006 Victorian Court of Appeal case

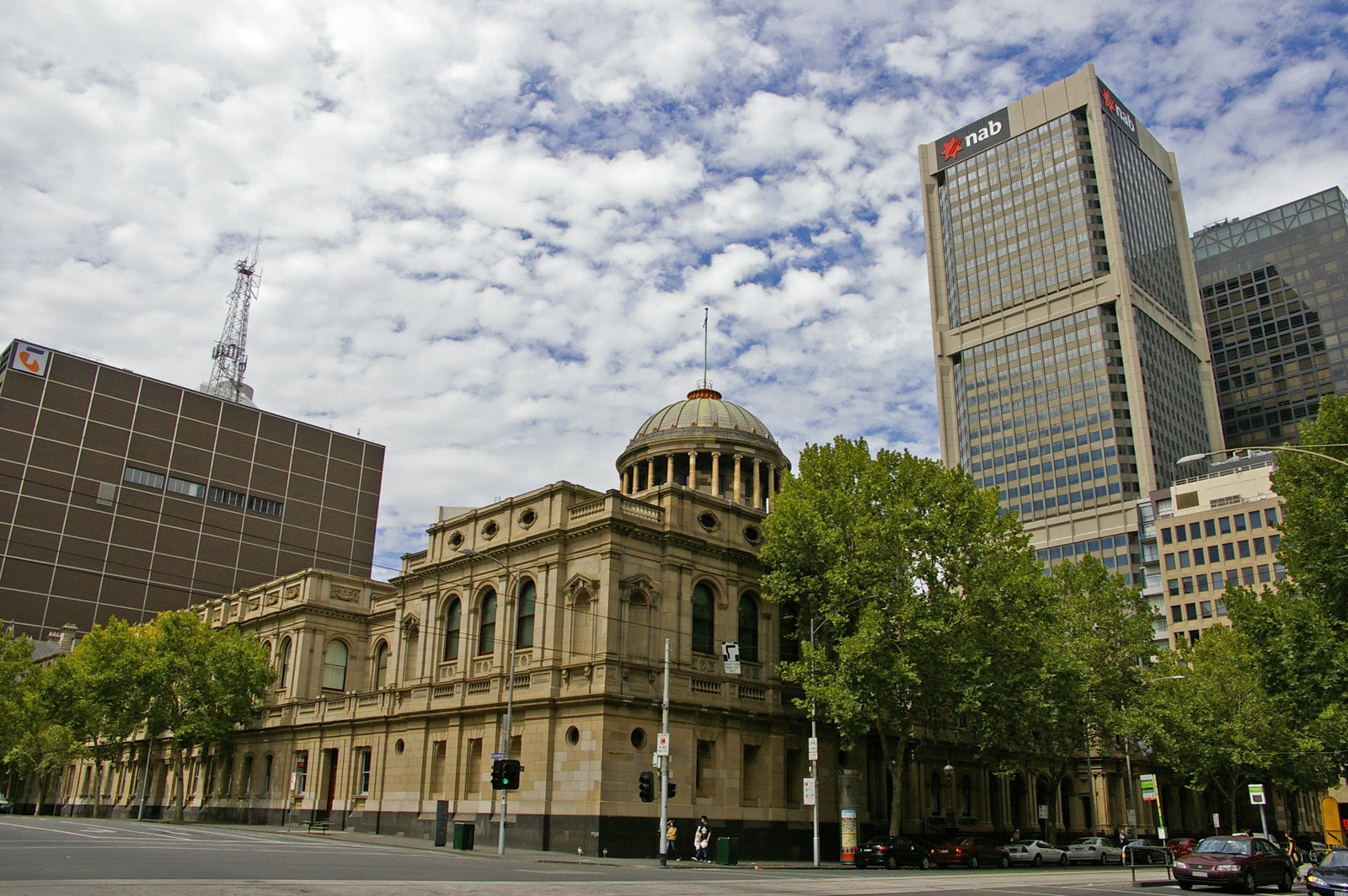
- Court: Supreme Court of Victoria
- Decided: 2006

Court membership
- Judges sitting: Nettle, Vincent, Ormiston JJ

Keywords
- Workplace safety law

R v ACR Roofing Pty Ltd was a decision by the Victorian Court of Appeal in Australia. A construction company was engaged to complete works on a roof which were not meant to proceed without the installation of safety equipment. The company hired a worker employed by another company who died as a result of the safety equipment not being installed. The Court ultimately held the principal construction company liable under Victorian workplace health and safety legislation.

== Background ==
The Occupational Health and Safety Act 2004 (OHS Act) is a Victorian statute imposing a duty upon 'employers' of employees to provide, so far as is reasonably practicable, a working environment that is safe and without risks to health. ACR Roofing (ACR) was engaged to install the roof of an extension to a building in Melbourne, Victoria, by a company named Peter Gibson Developments (PGD). Work was not allowed by law to commence on the roof without appropriate safety mesh being installed. ACR contracted with a third party, which in turn sub-contracted the work further to a fourth party which engaged a worker to complete the roof works. This worker had physical contact with the crane at the moment it touched a powerline, causing the worker to be electrocuted and fall from the roof. The safety mesh had not been installed and the worker died. The issue of whether or not ACR owed duties imposed by the OHS Act, and if such duties were breached by failing to install the required safety mesh was brought before the Victorian Court of Appeal (Court).

== Judgment ==
The Court gave the term from section 21(3) of the OHS Act 'engaged by the employer' a broad meaning. The Court held this means an employer is liable for any matters in which it had control, even if the contractor involved was not directly engaged but instead engaged as a sub-contractor. Richard Johnstone, writing in the Australian Journal of Labour Law, noted each contractor or sub-contractor, working or related to matters which the employer controlled, owed duties to each other and their employees. As a result, an employee who works directly for a labour hire company but engaged by a construction site employer may be owed a duty of care by both parties as 'employers'. This means an employee of a contractor is considered to be an 'employee' of the engager of that contractor. The decision was appealed to the High Court of Australia; however, the High Court refused to hear the appeal.

== Bibliography ==
- Walters, David (2011). Regulating Workplace Risks : a Comparative Study of Inspection Regimes in Times of Change. Richard Johnstone, Kaj Frick. Cheltenham: Edward Elgar Publishing. p. 78. ISBN 978-0-85793-165-8. OCLC 755414460.
- Smith, Gregory W. (2014). Contractor safety management. Boca Raton: Taylor and Francis. pp. 40–41. ISBN 978-1-4665-5685-0. OCLC 1031042233.
- Foster, Neil (2016). Workplace Health and Safety Law in Australia. LexisNexis. p. 99. ISBN 9780409342833.
- Johnstone, Richard (2006). "Take Me to Your Employer: The Organisational Reach of Occupational Health and Safety Regulation". Australian Journal of Labour Law. 19: 59–80 – via LexisNexis.
- Harpur, Paul (2011). "Clothing Manufacturing Supply Chains, Contractual Layers and Hold Harmless Clauses: How OHS Duties Can Be Imposed over Retailers". Australian Journal of Labour Law. 21 (3): 316–339 – via LexisNexis.
