= Academic grading in Australia =

Academic grading systems in Australia include:

== Tertiary institutions ==
Australian universities issue results for each subject, based on the following gradings:

%	ACU, ACS, Adelaide, Bond, Canberra, CDU, CQU, CSU, UDivinity, Flinders, JCU, MQ, Newcastle, QUT, SCU, UNE, UNSW, USYD, Torrens, UOW, USC, USQ (from semester 1, 2022), UTS, WSU, ACAP, AIM	UniSA	USQ (prior to semester 1, 2022)	Griffith, UQ identify specific grades in some courses	ANU, Curtin, Deakin, ECU, Monash, Murdoch, RMIT, UTAS, Swinburne, UWA, VU UNDA	FedUni	La Trobe	Melbourne
100	High Distinction (HD)	High Distinction (HD)	High Distinction (HD)	7	High Distinction (HD)	High Distinction (HD)	A	First Class Honours (H1)
95–99	High Distinction (HD)	High Distinction (HD)	High Distinction (HD)	7	High Distinction (HD)	High Distinction (HD)	A	First Class Honours (H1)
90–94	High Distinction (HD)	High Distinction (HD)	High Distinction (HD)	7	High Distinction (HD)	High Distinction (HD)	A	First Class Honours (H1)
85–89	High Distinction (HD)	High Distinction (HD)	High Distinction (HD)	7	High Distinction (HD)	High Distinction (HD)	A	First Class Honours (H1)
80–84	Distinction (D)	Distinction (D)	A	6	High Distinction (HD)	High Distinction (HD)	A	First Class Honours (H1)
75–79	Distinction (D)	Distinction (D)	A	6	Distinction (D)	Distinction (D)	B	Second Class Honours Div A (H2A)
70–74	Credit (C)	Credit (C)	B	5	Distinction (D)	Distinction (D)	B	Second Class Honours Div B (H2B)
65–69	Credit (C)	Credit (C)	B	5	Credit (C)	Credit (C)	C	Third Class Honours (H3)
60–64	Pass (P)	Pass 1 (P1)	C	4	Credit (C)	Credit (C)	C	Pass (P)
55–59	Pass (P)	Pass 1 (P1)	C	4	Pass (P)	Pass (P)	D	Pass (P)
50–54	Pass (P)	Pass 2 (P2)	C	4	Pass (P)	Pass (P)	D	Pass (P)
40–49	Fail (N)	Fail 1 (F1)	Fail (F, FNP, FNS, FNC or FLW)	1, 2, 3	Fail (N)	Marginal Fail (MF)	Fail (N)	Fail (N)
< 40	Fail (N)	Fail 2 (F2)	Fail (F, FNP, FNS, FNC or FLW)	1, 2, 3	Fail (N)	Fail (F)	Fail (N)	Fail (N)

Note that the numbers above do not correspond to a percentile, but are notionally a percentage of the maximum raw marks available. Various tertiary institutions in Australia have policies on the allocations for each grade and scaling may occur to meet these policies. These policies may vary also according to the degree year (higher percentages for later years), but generally, only 2–5% of students who pass (that is, who achieve raw marks of 50 or more) may be awarded a High Distinction grade, and 50% or more of passing students are awarded a basic Pass grade. Raw marks for students who fail are not scaled and do not increase the allocations of higher grades. Some universities also have a Pass Conceded (PC) grade for marks that fall in the range of 45–49 inclusive.

A few universities do not issue numeric grades out of 100 for individual subjects, instead relying on qualitative descriptors. Griffith University and The University of Queensland issue results of High Distinction, Distinction, Credit, Pass, and Fail.

== Grade point average ==
Grade point averages are not generally used in Australia below a tertiary level. At universities, they are calculated according to a more complicated formula than in some other nations:

$\text{GPA} = {{\sum {(\text{grade points} \times \text{credit points for unit})}} \over {\sum \text{credit points}}},$

where grade points are as follows:

Grade	UniSA	WSU JCU QUT UQ Griffith	USQ FedUni	CSU VU	Macquarie	Adelaide	CQU Flinders Newcastle SCU ANU Charles Darwin UTAS UWA AIM ACU	UTS	Monash	SUT	Bond Murdoch RMIT UNDA
High Distinction	7	7	7	7	7	7	7	7	4	4	4
Distinction	6	6	6	6	6	6	6	6	3	3	3
Credit	5	5	5	5	5	5	5	5	2	2	2
Pass	4.5 (P1) / 4 (P2)	4	4	4	4	4	4	4	1	1	1
Conceded Pass / Near Pass / Fail Level 1/Marginal Fail	3.5 (Supp.) / 3 (Conc.)	3	3	3	0	n/a	n/a	0	0.7	0.5	0
Fail	1.5 (F1 / F) / 1 (F2)	2	1.5	0	0	1.5	0	0	0.3	0	0
Withdrawn Fail/Late Withdrawal	1.5	1	1.5	0	0	0	0	0	0	0	0

A conceded pass is a pass for a course that has been awarded only after supplementary assessment has been undertaken by the student.

Where a course result is a Non-Graded Pass, the result will only be included if the GPA is less than 4, and will be assigned the grade point of 4, otherwise NGP results will be disregarded. The term course unit values is used to distinguish between courses which have different weightings, for example between a full year course and a single semester course.

Some other universities, such as the University of Melbourne, University of New South Wales, University of Sydney, and University of Wollongong use a Weighted Average Mark (WAM) for the same purpose as a GPA. The WAM is based on the raw percentage grades, or marks, achieved by the student, rather than grade points such as High Distinction or Distinction.
