= Killing of Rekiah O'Donnell =

2013 murder in Sunshine, Australia

Rekiah O'Donnell
- Born: 13 April 1991
- Died: October 2013 (aged 22); Australia
- Cause of death: Homicide (gunshot wound to the temple)
- Known for: Shooting victim

Nelson Lai
- Known for: The killing of Rekiah O'Donnell

In October 2013, 22-year-old Australian woman Rekiah O'Donnell was shot and killed by her boyfriend, Nelson Lai, in his home in Sunshine, a suburb of Melbourne. At the time of the shooting, Lai was under the influence of a purified form of methamphetamine known as "ice".

O'Donnell died of a single gunshot wound to the head. During the trial, Lai told the Victorian Supreme Court in 2015 that the killing of O'Donnell was an "accident" and he "didn't know there was one [bullet] in it" when referring to the gun. During the 14-month relationship, Lai allegedly beat and punched O'Donnell and made threats, including a text message reading "I'll kill you, rat". The jury found Lai guilty of manslaughter over the 22-year-old's death.

Since the death, O'Donnell's family has made a Change.org petition to create an Australian law called "Rekiah's Law".
