= Australian Journal of Labour Law =

Australian legal journal

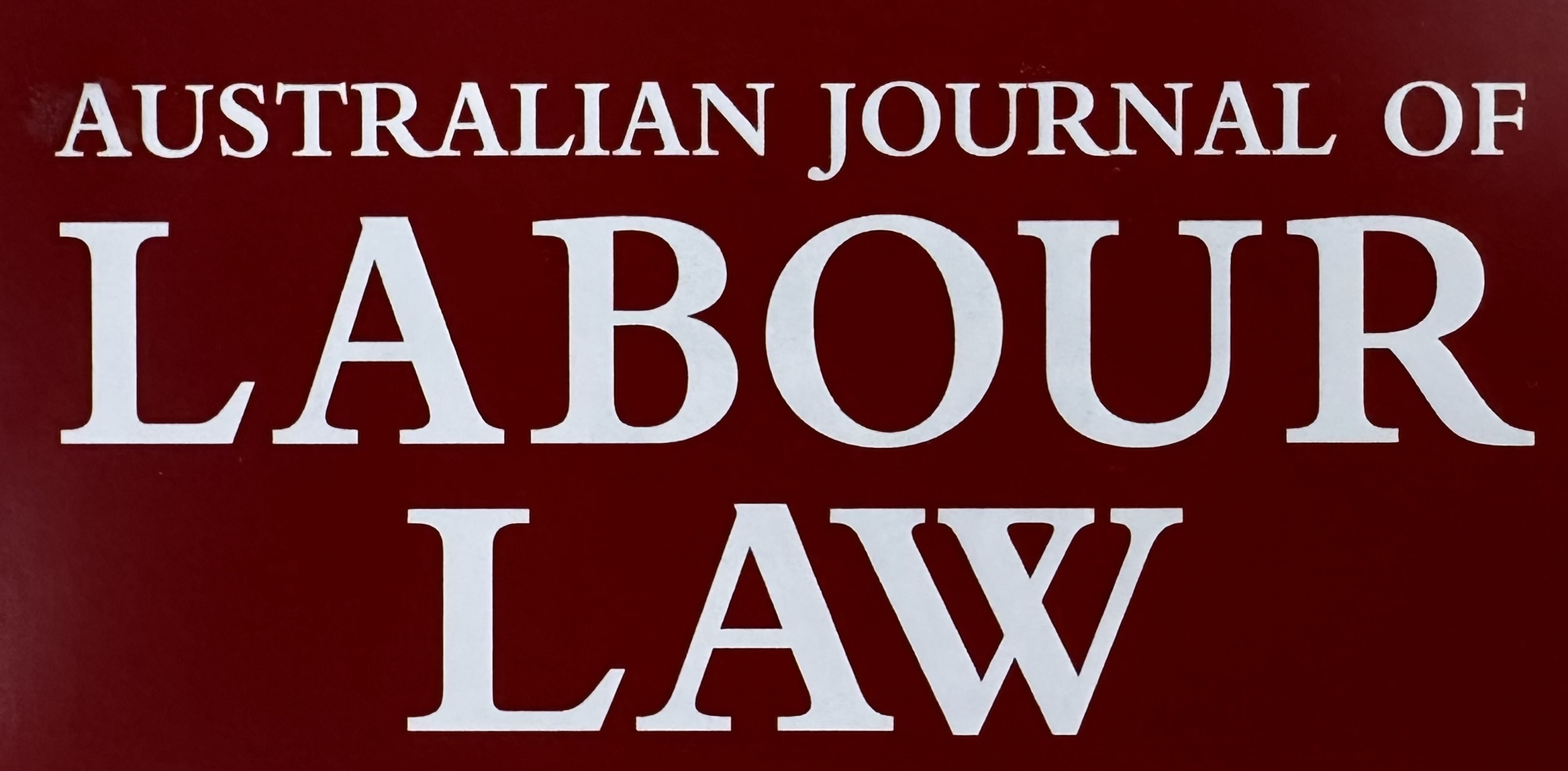
- Discipline: Labour law
- Language: English
- Edited by: John Howe, Shae McCrystal, Andrew Stewart

Publication details
- History: 1968–present
- Publisher: LexisNexis (Australia)
- Frequency: Triannual

Standard abbreviations
- ISO 4: Aust. J. Labour Law

Indexing
- ISSN: 1030-7222
- OCLC no.: 19760687

Links
- Journal homepage; Online access; Journal page at publisher website

The Australian Journal of Labour Law is a triannual peer-reviewed law journal that was established in 1968. It is published by LexisNexis in collaboration with the Centre For Employment and Labour Relations Law (Melbourne Law School). It covers Australian labour law. The editors-in-chief are Andrew Stewart (University of Adelaide law school), John Howe (University of Melbourne), and Shae McCrystal (University of Sydney). Past editors include Anna Chapman (Melbourne Law School) and Rosemary Owens (University of Adelaide). The journal is abstracted and indexed in EBSCO databases.
