= R v Cogdon =

Australian murder court case influential on the study of automatism

King v. Cogdon
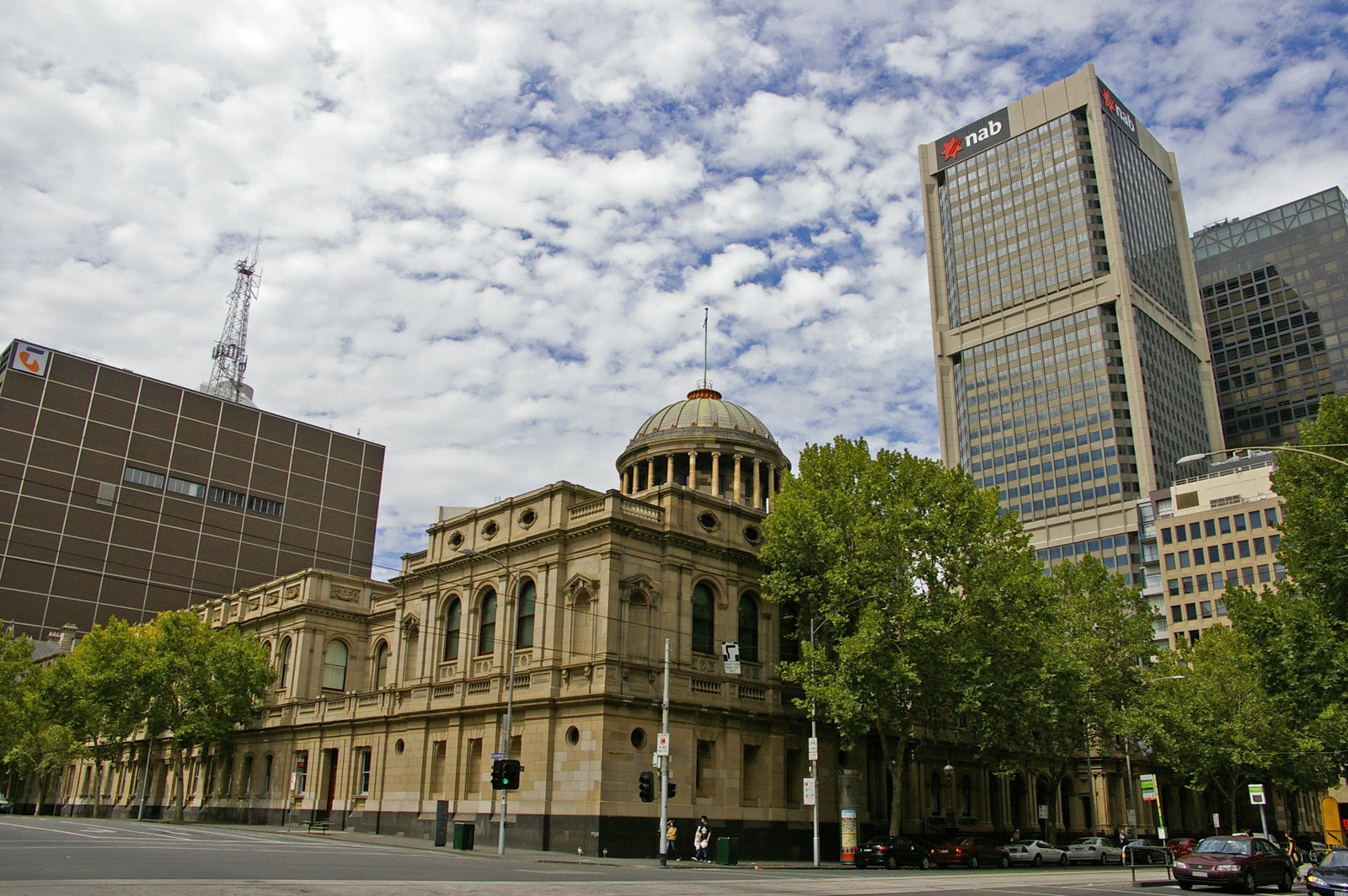
- Court: Supreme Court of Victoria
- Decided: December 1950

Court membership
- Judge sitting: Mr Justice Smith

Keywords
- Criminal law; Automatism

R v Cogdon, also known as King v Cogdon, is a 1950 criminal case heard by the Supreme Court of Victoria in Australia where a woman successfully defended herself against a homicide charge using the defence of non-insane automatism. The case was not formally reported but it has been referenced both by legal scholars and those in other disciplines.

== Summary of the case ==
One night, the defendant – Mrs. Cogdon – left her bedroom while sleepwalking. She claims that in this state she saw her 19-year-old daughter Pat being attacked by Korean soldiers. Fearing the worst, while fully in the grip of her sleepwalking, she located an axe and attempted to attack the illusory soldiers. In the process, she killed her daughter.

At trial, Mrs. Cogdon pleaded not guilty. The court heard how Pat had suffered from some neurotic conditions which were characterised as relatively minor, and which her psychiatrist had claimed had been cured. Mrs. Cogdon had suffered a number of strange events in the run up to the killing of Pat: she had suffered a nightmare where her house had been invaded by spiders. Believing the spiders were attacking Pat, she entered her room and attempted to forcibly remove the spiders from her face, waking her in the process. Mrs. Cogdon told Pat she was just tucking her into bed.

On the night of Pat's death, Mr. Cogdon was out of the house. Mrs. Cogdon offered to take Pat to see a movie, but Pat could not find a movie she wished to watch in the listings in the newspaper. Pat instead decided to stay in and get an early night. As evidence of Mrs. Cogdon's care for her daughter, it was noted she had prepared a hot water bottle for Pat and a glass of warm milk. At trial, Mr. Cogdon also testified that his wife had an excellent relationship with their daughter: "I don't think a mother could have thought any more of her daughter. I think she absolutely adored her."

== Decision ==
Before the Cogdon case, no established case law existed for dealing with automatism defences.

The jury found her not guilty.
