= Edward Jenks =

British legal academic

Edward Jenks FBA
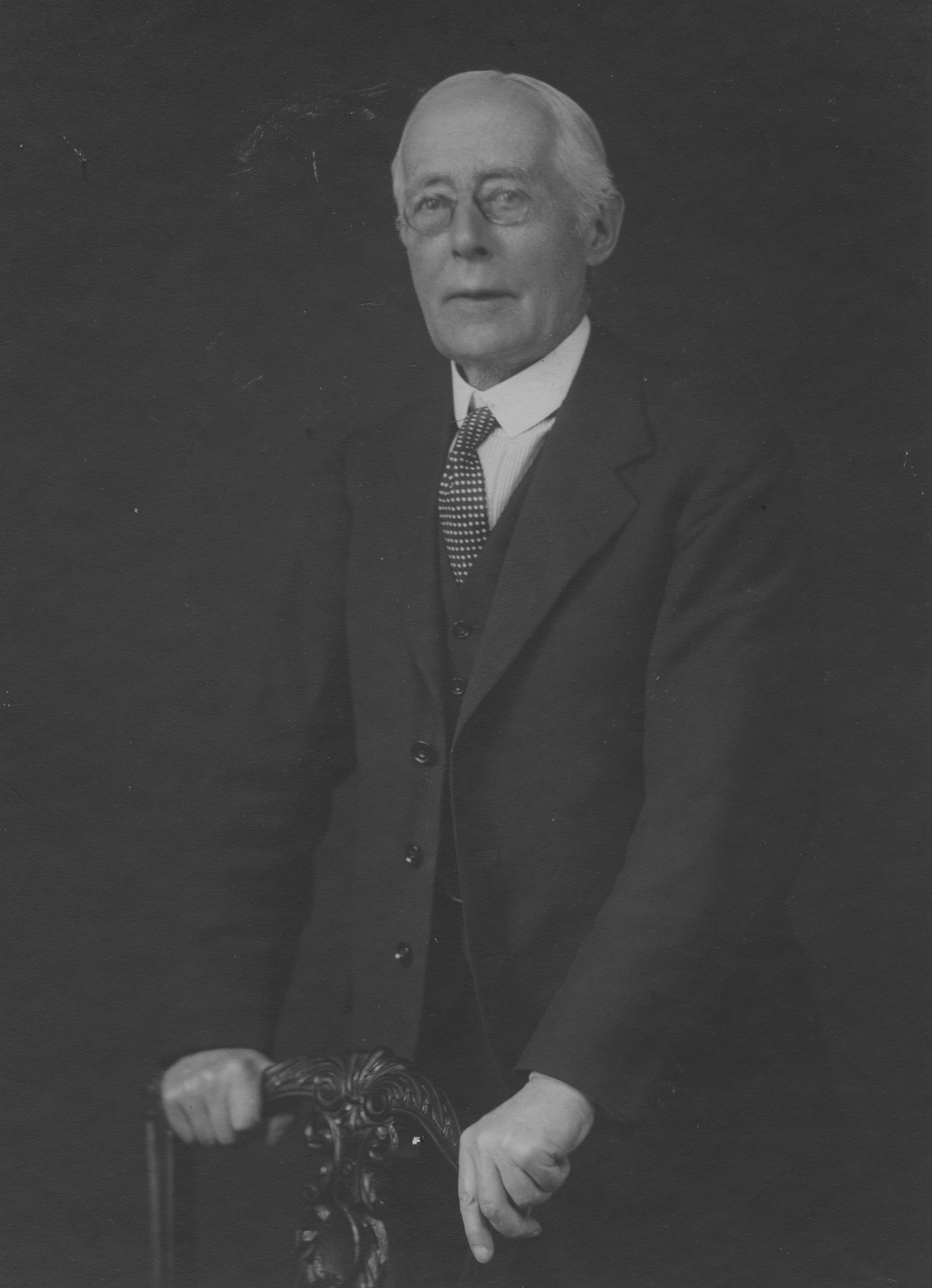
- Born: 20 February 1861; Lambeth, London
- Died: 10 November 1939 (aged 78); Bishop's Tawton, Devonshire
- Citizenship: United Kingdom
- Awards: 1889 Thirlwall Prize

Academic background
- Education: King's College, Cambridge (BA, LLB)

Academic work
- Discipline: Jurisprudence
- Institutions: Jesus College, Cambridge; University of Melbourne; University College, Liverpool; Victoria University of Manchester; University of Oxford; University of London; London School of Economics

Edward Jenks, FBA (1861–1939) was an English jurist, and noted writer on law and its place in history. Born on 20 February 1861 in Lambeth, London, to Robert Jenks, upholsterer, and his wife Frances Sarah, née Jones, he was educated at Dulwich College (1874–77) and King's College, Cambridge, where he was scholar (1886) and, in 1889-95, fellow. He graduated B.A., LL.B. in 1886, and M.A. in 1890. He was awarded the Le Bas Prize and the Thirlwall Prize and was chancellor's medallist. In 1887 he was called to the Bar and for the next two years lectured at Pembroke and Jesus colleges, Cambridge.

He was a brilliant law student at King's College, Cambridge and was placed first in the law tripos of 1886. He was called to the bar in 1887.

He held many seats: Director of Studies in Law and History at Jesus College, Cambridge 1888-9, Dean at the faculty of law University of Melbourne 1890, University College, Liverpool 1890-92 then later to 1895 at Victoria University of Manchester, reader of English at University of Oxford from 1896, and then at the University of London from 1928-1930 as a professor of English law in the London School of Economics and Political Science, being succeeded by Sir David Hughes Parry.

Jenks was a Fellow of the British Academy. He was a founder of the Society of Public Teachers of Law and its secretary 1909-1917.

He married first in 1890 to Annie Ingham, who died after giving birth to a son; the son would die fighting in the Great War. His second marriage in 1898 was to Dorothy Maud, a daughter of Sir William Bower Forwood, with whom he had a daughter, and a son Jorian Jenks.

Jenks wrote a number of books and essays dealing with law, politics and history. He was the principal editor of A Digest of English Civil Law (1905–1917) which led to receipt of an honorary doctorate from Paris. After two further editions in his lifetime (1921 and 1938), the fourth edition (1947), edited in his place by P. H. Winfield, retained Jenks's Prolegomena, with its opening remark that a digest uses the indicative mood rather than the imperative mood of a code, and differs from an encyclopaedia in that it aims at economy of words. In the preface to the first instalment of the 1905-17 edition, Jenks mentioned that the work had resulted from a suggestion of the President of the Berlin Society for Comparative Jurisprudence and Political Economy for a statement of English law, intended by the Society as the first of its projected series of handbooks on the legal systems of modern civilized communities, it being the Society's intention to produce a series of works to be modelled after the pattern of the German Civil Code which came into force throughout the German Empire on 1 January 1900, but departing from the arrangement of the German Code as considered advisable. Jenks's Digest was published by Butterworths, who, from 1907, were also publishing Halsbury's Laws of England as a "complete statement of the whole law of England".

Edward Jenks is most famous for his iconoclastic essay The Myth of Magna Carta published in the Independent Review in 1904. Jenks argued against Stubbs's proposition that Magna Carta was the first corporate act of the nation roused to the sense of its unity, when the people of the towns and villages ranged themselves on the side of the barons against the king for the first time since the Norman Conquest.

== Partial bibliography ==
- The Government of Victoria (Australia) (1891)
- The History of the Doctrine of Consideration in English Law (1892) (Yorke Prize essay 1891)
- A History of Politics 4th edition (1910)
- A Short History Of The English Law, 1st edition (1912)
- Law and Politics in the Middle Ages 2nd edition (1913)
- An Outline of English Local Government 5th edition (1921)
- Edward Plantagenet (Edward I) : The English Justinian or the making of the common law (1923)
- A Short History of English Law 5th edition (1934)
- The State and the Nation revised edition (1935)
- The Book of English Law 4th edition (1936)
- The Government of the British Empire 5th edition (1937)
