= 2021 Australian Parliament House sexual misconduct allegations =

Political scandal

In February and March 2021, a number of allegations involving rape and other sexual misconduct against women involving the Australian Parliament and federal politicians were raised, causing controversy especially for the federal Liberal–National Morrison government.

== 2019 rape in Parliament House allegation ==
=== Background and allegation ===
On 15 February 2021, Liberal Party junior staffer Brittany Higgins alleged to two media outlets, news.com.au and The Project, that she was raped in the early hours of 23 March 2019 in then-Defence Industry Minister Senator Linda Reynolds' office in the ministerial wing of Parliament House by a colleague, later named as Bruce Lehrmann, after security guards admitted the pair into the building. Higgins said she became heavily intoxicated at a work party and left with her colleague in a taxi, believing they would both be dropped at their respective homes; instead she said she was taken to Parliament House and raped while slipping in and out of consciousness, waking to find her skirt around her waist. In contrast, Lehrmann told police that he and Higgins returned to Parliament House because he needed to pick up his keys, and as Higgins indicated she also needed to return to the office he offered to share his Uber ride. Once they arrived in Reynolds' suite, Lehrmann said he "turned left towards his desk, while Ms Higgins turned right and went to a different part of the office". After working "on a briefing for Parliament's question time," Lehrmann said he left the office without seeing Higgins again. Higgins was later found naked, inebriated and disoriented in the early hours of the morning in the minister's office.

Three days later, on 26 March 2019, Lehrmann was told by Fiona Brown, Reynolds' chief of staff, to "collect his belongings from the office and leave" because of his late-night entry into the office at 1:48 am on the previous Saturday, and an earlier unrelated incident of him mishandling a classified document, with Reynolds consequently terminating Lehrmann's employment formally on 5 April 2019. On 1 April 2019, Reynolds called Higgins to her office to discuss Higgins' late-night entry into the office, which Reynolds "believed to be a security breach [...] describing the decision of two staff to come into the office at 1:40 am as 'highly unusual' and not appropriate". Higgins went to the police after the alleged rape, but dropped the complaint in April 2019, fearful the report would result in termination of her employment. Eventually Higgins transferred to work for Employment, Skills, Small and Family Business Minister Michaelia Cash for a year before resigning a month before going public with her allegations.

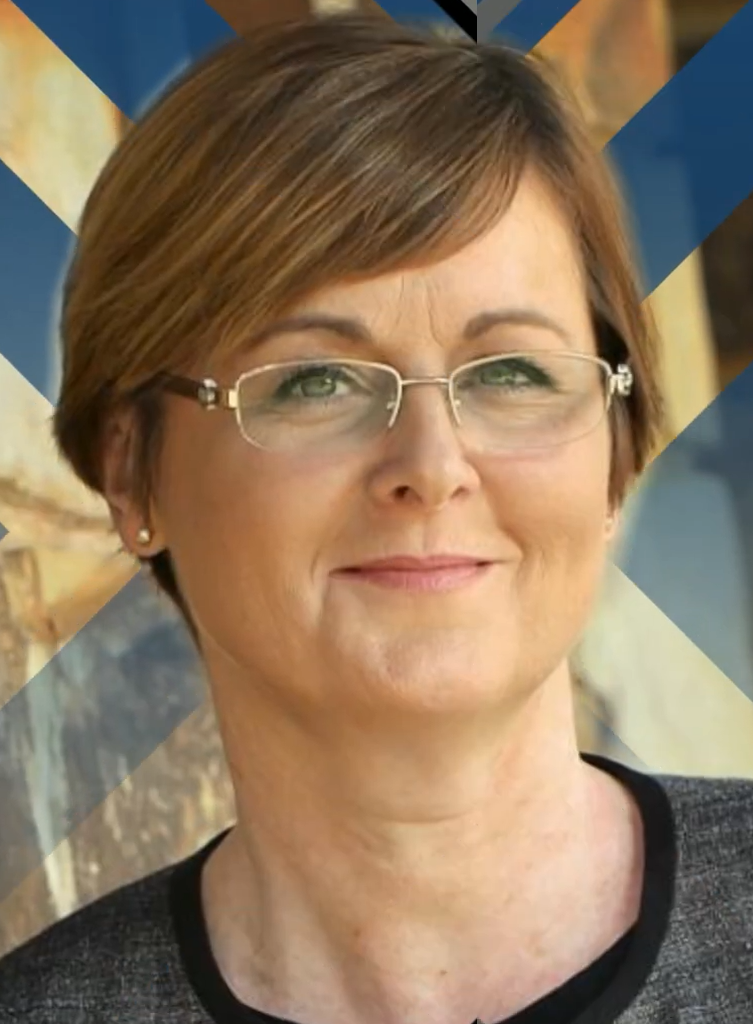
Senator for Western Australia Linda Reynolds, who was criticised for her handling of the alleged rape within her office.

Higgins has accused Reynolds of not supporting her due to the politically sensitive nature of the incident in an election year, and claims to have "repeatedly told her superiors in [...] the offices of Cash and [...] Linda Reynolds" about the alleged rape; "Reynolds and Reynolds' chief of staff, Fiona Brown, soon after the alleged rape, including in a meeting on 1 April 2019". However, "Brown disputes Higgins' timeline", and during the trial Reynolds told the court "that she did not know of a sexual assault allegation when she called Brittany to her office", the office where the alleged rape occurred.

Controversy also arose following Higgins's public announcement regarding Scott Morrison's awareness of the allegations. Morrison, the Prime Minister at the time, denied any knowledge of the assault until Monday 15 February 2021. In late February 2021 it emerged that Scott Ryan knew about the security incident on 27 March 2019, and Tony Smith found out about it on 8 April 2019. Ryan, who was Senate President at the time, and Smith, who was Speaker, were jointly responsible for security in Parliament House at the time and only became aware of Higgins and the alleged sexual assault on Friday 12 February 2021, with Ryan saying he only knew the full details on that Friday. Higgins also claims to have "told Cash [...] multiple times", and recorded a February 2021 conversation with Cash to collect "evidence that Cash had known about her alleged rape since 2019". However, during the trial Michaelia Cash said she knew about a security incident in late 2019 when Higgins began working for her, but only became aware of the rape allegation on 5 February 2021. Peter Dutton, Home Affairs Minister at the time, also knew about the allegation on 11 February 2021 but sought no further action, nor did he alert the prime minister. The prime minister's office seemed to have known details on Friday 12 February 2021 when it first got questions from news.com.au, but staff did not tell the prime minister until Monday 15 February 2021. Higgins criticised Morrison's response and cast doubts over his claim of ignorance.

=== Response to allegation ===
Reynolds publicly apologised to Higgins, as did Morrison. Morrison also announced two investigations into the workplace culture at Parliament House. Morrison issued a formal apology on 16 February 2021 and penned a letter to Opposition Leader Anthony Albanese, agreeing to develop an independent review into the workplaces of federal parliamentarians and their staff, as well as ordering an internal review into workplace culture and complaints handled within the Liberal Party.

Over the following weeks, three more women alleged they had been sexually harassed or assaulted by the same man, still not publicly named at the time, between 2016 and 2020. One woman alleged on 20 February 2021 she was raped in 2020 by the man after the pair had dinner and drinks. On 22 February 2021, a second woman alleged she was sexually assaulted by the man in 2016. A third woman also accused the man of unwanted advances and stroking her thigh under the table at a Canberra bar in 2017. After the story went public, and even though the accused was not named in publications, the accused was stood aside from his job at a large corporation where he had worked from July 2020. He checked himself into a Sydney hospital and the next day he was in a private rehabilitation clinic.

On 4 March, it was reported that Reynolds had referred to Higgins as a "lying cow" after the initial media reports. The Australian reported Senator Reynolds made the comment in the open part of her office and was heard by several staff members, including public servants on secondment from the Department of Defence. Reynolds did not deny using the slur against Higgins, but said it was not about the rape allegation itself, but about reports of the level of support provided. Higgins threatened legal action against Reynolds. Reynolds and Higgins later reached a settlement in a defamation claim under which Reynolds apologised and agreed to pay damages to Higgins, which Higgins intended to donate to a sexual assault support group in the Canberra area.

Reynolds was pressured to reveal what she had known about the incident. On 16 February, Morrison publicly rebuked Reynolds for not telling him of the incident at the time. Reynolds was due to address the National Press Club on 24 February, but that morning she cancelled the address and was admitted to Canberra Hospital. It was announced that she had taken medical leave related to a pre-existing condition. Reynolds continued to be on medical leave until 2 April on the advice of her cardiologist, and was not questioned during that time in or outside Parliament on the circumstances or of her knowledge of the alleged rape.

Reynolds's sick leave was initially for two weeks, but on the weekend before she would have returned to work, she was advised by her cardiologist to extend her medical leave to 2 April 2021, a total of six weeks. Labor senator Kristina Keneally called for Reynolds to resign, saying "Is the Minister of defence, Linda Reynolds, trying to pretend she is (on one hand) well enough to continue as Defence Minister, but not well enough on the other to front up and answer to questions in parliament and the (Senate) estimates?" Keneally also called for an independent investigation into allegations against Porter.

On 30 April, Higgins met with Morrison and said she had a "frank and honest" discussion with him. Higgins said the pair also talked about reforming the legislation under which staffers are hired, known as the Members of Parliament (Staff) or MoPS Act.

On 22 May 2021, the ABC's Four Corners reported,

Nikola Anderson, who has worked as a Parliament House security guard for 12 years, told Four Corners how she found Ms Higgins in the office of then-defence industry minister Linda Reynolds after the alleged rape. Anderson was asked to do a welfare check on Higgins, and around 4:20 am found Higgins naked on a lounge. Noting Higgins was conscious and did not look to be in distress, the guard shut the door and went back to her duties.

=== Legal proceedings ===
The man accused of the rape, Bruce Lehrmann, appeared by telephone at the Magistrates Court of the Australian Capital Territory on 5 November 2021 and pleaded not guilty. He was committed for trial in the Supreme Court of the Australian Capital Territory. In April 2022 the defence team for the accused applied to have his trial halted indefinitely as Morrison's apology to Higgins "imputed the accused with guilt of the offence or at least implicitly assumed the truthfulness of the complaint", and could endanger Lehrmann's right to a fair trial. The judge dismissed the application, saying that a jury member being aware of pre-trial publicity "is not of itself problematic". Higgins made a complaint against the Australian Federal Police for unlawfully giving Lehrmann's defence team protected evidence, including counselling notes and video recordings. The trial was further delayed in June 2022 following the judge warning that the line between allegation and a finding of guilt had been "obliterated" in an acceptance speech by Lisa Wilkinson at the Logie Awards of 2022 and in commentary following the speech.

The trial of Lehrmann began on 4 October 2022. It concluded on 19 October, and the jury retired to consider its verdict. On 27 October, the trial was abandoned after it was discovered that a juror had conducted private research and taken their findings into the jury room. Higgins subsequently criticised the criminal justice system on live television, saying it "has long failed to deliver outcomes to victims of sexual assault". Lehrmann's lawyer said "We have brought [Higgins'] comments to the attention of the court and the Australian Federal Police ... as to whether the complainant's statements might amount to a contempt of court or offences against the ACT Criminal Code".

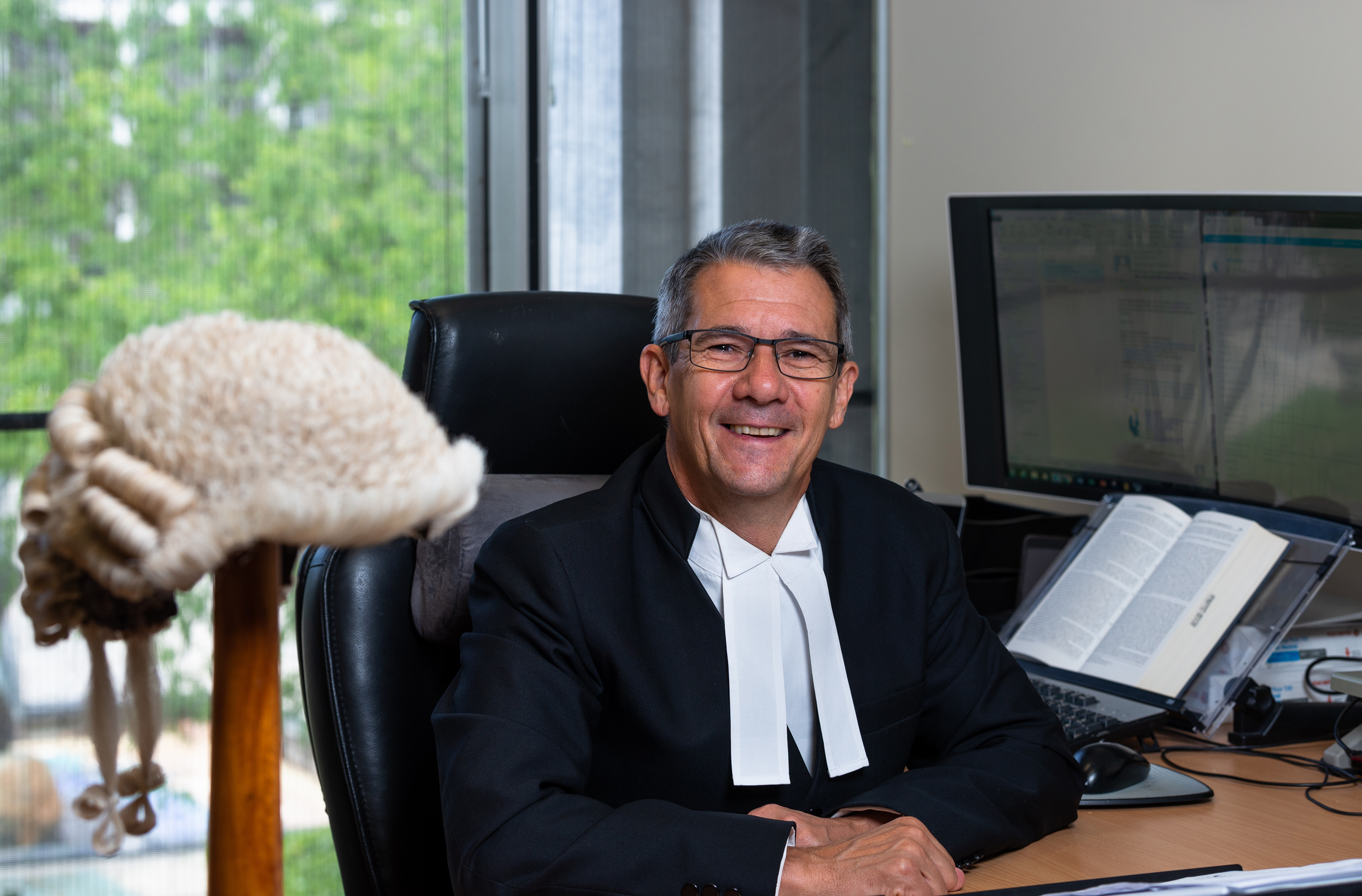
Australian Capital Territory's Director of Public Prosecutions Shane Drumgold, who made the decision to drop the Higgins case

The matter was relisted for 20 February 2023, although a senior barrister soon after said it remained to be seen if the case is retried, given the extent of comments by politicians and media personalities now making Lehrmann virtually untriable. In December 2022 the case was dropped by Shane Drumgold, the Director of Public Prosecutions, stating it was "no longer in the public interest to pursue a prosecution" after receiving evidence "that the ongoing trauma associated with this prosecution presents a significant and unacceptable risk to the life of the complainant". On 3 December 2022 it emerged that police assessed the evidence as insufficient to prosecute, and "expressed a number of concerns about the case". The accused "consistently maintained his innocence and the case against him was not proven", with the Director of Public Prosecutions declaring that "this brings the prosecution to an end." However, the manner in which the case transpired was criticised.

On 4 December 2022, it was reported that both Higgins and Lehrmann were considering compensation claims. Higgins reportedly intended to sue Reynolds, Cash and the Commonwealth for about A$3 million. On 13 December, Higgins and the Commonwealth reached agreement and Higgins was awarded an undisclosed sum in compensation. This was later disclosed as being $2.3M, and was negotiated in controversial circumstances with the Federal Attorney General specifically excluding Senators Reynolds and Cash and former staffer Fiona Brown from appearing or providing any evidence for the mediation.

The Guardian reported on 8 December that a letter sent in November by Drumgold to the ACT police chief asked for a public enquiry into the case to look at "both political and police conduct". The letter also alleged that police investigators were 'clearly aligned with the successful defence of this matter". The Australian Federal Police Association published a statement calling the allegations a "smear" and unproven while also calling for an investigation into the case. The ACT government subsequently announced an independent inquiry into the case. The results of the inquiry were strongly condemnatory of the behavior of Drumgold, resulting in his resignation.

In January 2023, Reynolds commenced defamation proceedings against Higgins' partner over two tweets that he made.

On 26 October 2023, it was revealed that, in December 2022, Lehrmann was charged with two counts of rape in an unrelated matter that allegedly occurred in Toowoomba in October 2021. He is awaiting trial on that matter. Lehrmann's identity had been the subject of a suppression order in the interim.

In 2023, Lehrmann sued Lisa Wilkinson and Network Ten for defamation over the interview with Higgins which aired on The Project in 2021. Lehrmann told the court that Wilkinson destroyed his right to a "fair criminal trial". Lehrmann claimed in court that he felt isolated and ostracised after Higgins' interview on The Project. He said "I became severely isolated," and admitted to a private hospital suffering emotional distress. The defamation case was judged in favour of Network Ten on 15 April 2024, with Justice Michael Lee concluding that there was "substantial truth" to the allegation that Lehrmann raped Higgins.

== 1988 rape allegation against Christian Porter ==
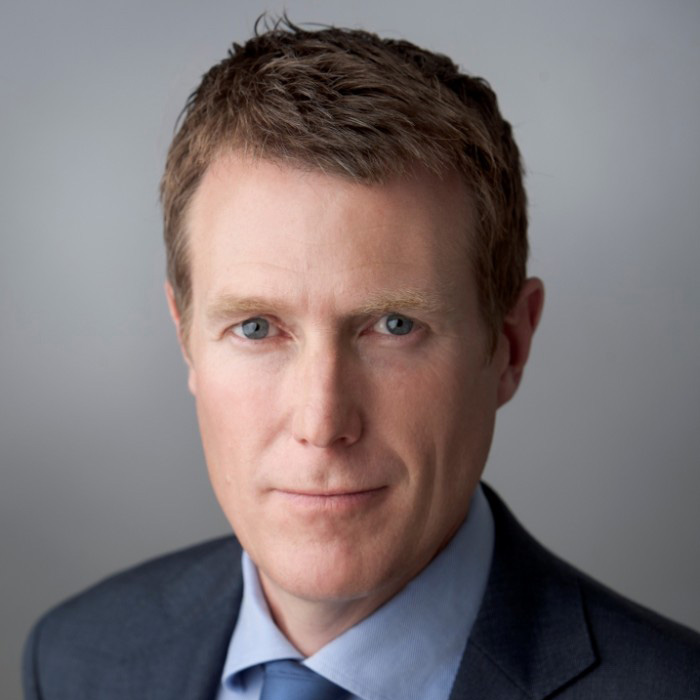
Christian Porter, former Attorney-General of Australia and Member for Pearce

On 26 February 2021, the ABC published details of a letter that had been sent to the Prime Minister and several other members of parliament, including then Senate Opposition Leader Penny Wong and Greens Senator Sarah Hanson-Young. It alleged that a 16-year-old girl had been raped in Sydney in 1988 by a man who was now a member of Cabinet. The letter was anonymous, and included a statement by the alleged victim, who had opened a case with New South Wales Police in 2020, but closed it shortly before taking her own life in Adelaide in June 2020.

On 2 March, NSW Police stated they would not reopen the case as they had insufficient evidence to do so.

The identity of the minister was not disclosed, but on 3 March Christian Porter, then Attorney-General, House Leader and Industrial Relations Minister, held a press conference identifying himself as the minister. Porter denied the allegation and said he would not stand down from his positions but would take leave to recover his mental health.

While some legal experts have opposed calls for an inquiry, others urged the Prime Minister to conduct an independent investigation into the allegation, along with Wong, Hanson-Young and the deceased's lawyer. However, Morrison refused to do so, stating it was unnecessary if the police had closed their case. Proponents of an inquiry compare the situation to that which led to an inquiry into the behaviour of former High Court of Australia judge Dyson Heydon in 2020. People who regard an inquiry as unnecessary compare the situation to when then-opposition leader Bill Shorten was accused in 2014 of raping a woman in 1986. No further inquiry was held after Victorian police investigated the allegation and concluded there was "no reasonable prospect of conviction". Morrison continued to block calls for an inquiry, instead moving Porter to the role of Minister for Industry, Innovation and Science in March 2021.

The woman wrote that she had always remembered the alleged event, but had gained "a better understanding" through therapy in September 2019 which had "resurface[d]" her "somatic memories"; while friends said that she told them about the incident before this therapy. It later emerged that in 2013 she had spoken to a counsellor about the alleged rape. A former boyfriend of the woman said that he had had "relevant discussions" with the woman in 1989 and with Porter in the 1990s, without specifying what was discussed. On 9 March 2021, the Four Corners episode "Bursting the Canberra Bubble" provided more background on the woman, and the circumstances of the night in 1988 when the alleged rape occurred. It was reported that the woman who made the allegation was prepared to provide a statement. NSW Police were notified and the woman met with detectives "on short notice" in Sydney on 27 February 2020. NSW investigators had applied on 10 March 2020 for travel to South Australia to interview the woman, but the application was vetoed by NSW Police Deputy Commissioner. It was also revealed that the woman, who lived in South Australia, had asked NSW Police in early April 2020 to make a statement via Skype, but was dissuaded from doing so. On 8 April 2021, it was reported that the woman's boyfriend met with detectives twice in March and made a formal statement. Police are not proposing to reopen the investigation.

In March 2021, MinterEllison CEO Annette Kimmitt used a series of emails to staff to criticise her firm's decision to represent Porter. MinterEllison's board was critical of Kimmitt's actions and she later stood down.

On 15 March 2021, Porter launched a defamation claim against the ABC and reporter Louise Milligan, for publishing the allegation. His claim argued that although the original allegation did not name him, he was "readily identifiable" and that the article was intended to harm him. The claim was withdrawn on 31 May 2021, with the ABC paying the costs of mediation and appending an editor's note to the original article stating that "The ABC did not contend that the serious accusations could be substantiated to the applicable legal standard". However, no damages were awarded.

On 10 June 2021 film producer and festival director Jo Dyer, confidante of the alleged victim, was awarded A$550,000 in costs after she brought separate litigation to prevent one of Porter's defamation lawyers, Sue Chrysanthou, from representing him. Dyer alleged that Chrysanthou had conflicting interests in the case, as she had previously had access to confidential information about the victim and Porter involving Dyer relating to a separate incident.

On 24 June 2021, the original dossier detailing the rape allegation against Porter was made publicly available by the Federal Court of Australia. On 20 October 2021, the Coalition government blocked a Labor bid to have Porter investigated by House privileges committee over whether he had breached parliamentary rules over his financial disclosures, despite Speaker Tony Smith having ruled that there was a prima facie case for further scrutiny. The move from the government attracted significant criticism in the media.

In January 2022, Porter and Chrysanthou were ordered to pay costs of A$430,200 for the case brought by Dyer, although Porter was appealing the decision.

In June 2023, the NSW Bar Council reprimanded Chrysanthou for acting for Porter, after Dyer had made a separate complaint to them about the matter.

== Further allegations ==
=== Australian Labor Party allegations ===
On 28 February 2021, Liberal Senator Sarah Henderson said a woman had sent her an email alleging she had been raped by a man who is now a Labor federal member of Parliament. A date for the alleged rape was not given, but it was described as "historic". The matter has been referred to the Australian Federal Police.

In March 2021, details emerged of a Facebook group where women have shared stories of sexual harassment within the Labor Party, but without sharing the names of the alleged harassers. Deputy leader Richard Marles said he was "appalled".

Party leader Anthony Albanese said he had read the allegations and found them "very disappointing". He encouraged the women to come forward, to make formal complaints and "name names", saying the party needed complaints against specific people before they could take action. Albanese added that the party had recently set up a new code of conduct and process to handle misconduct allegations.

=== Lewd photos and videos ===
In March 2021, photos and videos were leaked from a group chat of male government staffers, where they had performed sex acts in Parliament House, including masturbating on the desk of female MP Nola Marino. Peta Credlin alleged:

when an MP cleaned out the former staffer's desk, and the computer, that MP uncovered evidence that for many months, that staffer had regularly met with other men during the middle of the day – while the MP was in Question Time – for orgies in political offices.

=== Alleged comments by Eric Abetz ===
On 24 March 2021, two days after resigning from the Liberal Party, Tasmanian House of Assembly speaker Sue Hickey used parliamentary privilege to claim Liberal Senator Eric Abetz said to her, "As for that Higgins girl, anybody so disgustingly drunk who would sleep with anybody could have slept with one of our spies and put the security of the nation at risk"; and in reference to the Christian Porter allegations, "the woman is dead and the law will protect [Porter]". Abetz categorically denied making the comments and accused Hickey of "trying to destroy the [Liberal] party".

=== Behaviour of Andrew Laming ===
On 26 March 2021, Morrison demanded that federal Liberal MP Andrew Laming both personally and publicly apologise to two women for trolling them on Facebook, and stop using social media to post trolling comments. It was also alleged that Laming hid in bushes in a public park and took photos of one of the women. She reported the incidents to the police. On 27 March, Laming stood aside from all parliamentary roles after another woman accused him of taking a mobile phone photo of her bottom while her underwear was visible in 2019. Laming said he will take medical leave and use the time to complete counselling services he had previously committed to. Laming announced he would resign from politics at the 2022 federal election, although he later reversed his decision and attempted to renominate for his seat. However, the Liberal National Party of Queensland blocked his nomination, forcing him into retirement. Subsequent defamation proceedings against the ABC journalist Louise Milligan and Nine Entertainment about Andrew Laming resulted in an apology and settlement from Nine and the ABC.

=== Behaviour of Frank Zumbo ===
In June 2021, Frank Zumbo, a staffer of Craig Kelly, was charged with sexual offences, including allegedly sexually touching and indecently assaulting three women in their 20s, and a teenage girl on multiple occasions over a period of about six years. Kelly had earlier maintained, in March 2021, that no-one had any complaints about Zumbo, despite former staffers saying they had raised specific complaints about Zumbo with Kelly in 2013. Zumbo was bailed, remaining on Kelly's team while pleading not guilty and facing 18 charges. A fifth alleged victim later came forward. A verdict was expected in late October 2023; in February 2024 Zumbo was convicted of indecently assaulting four women, and was sentenced to a two-year intensive corrections order to be served in the community. Zumbo is appealing this decision.

== Impact ==
=== 2021 ===
The allegations sparked discussions over a toxic workplace culture, systemic misogyny and victim blaming both in political establishments and wider society.

The Morrison government was widely criticised for its handling of these scandals, with an Essential poll finding 65% of respondents (including 76% of Labor supporters, 51% of Coalition supporters and 88% of Greens supporters) saying the Government was more interested in protecting itself than women.

As well as from Labor and the Greens, the government faced criticism from within its own party. Former Prime Minister Malcolm Turnbull, who had been made aware of the allegations against Porter in 2019, criticised him for taking too long to come forward. Former Prime Minister John Howard, however, defended Morrison's decision not to open an independent inquiry into Porter's conduct. Former deputy Liberal leader and former Foreign Affairs Minister Julie Bishop also criticised the Morrison government and said that handling of sexual harassment was an issue for all parties in Parliament.

2021 Australian of the Year and sexual assault survivor advocate Grace Tame also criticised Morrison's rhetoric during her National Press Club of Australia address on 3 March 2021, criticising his use of the "as a father" phrase, as well as saying "It shouldn't take having children to have a conscience."

On 5 March 2021, Sex Discrimination Commissioner Kate Jenkins said she will lead a review of Parliament House's workplace culture. Jenkins's final report was released on 30 November 2021. It contained 28 recommendations.

On 23 March 2021, Prime Minister Scott Morrison held an extraordinary behind-closed-doors meeting with 400 Coalition staff at which he admitted his government's shortcomings in tackling sexism and bad behaviour, and acknowledged they had put up with "absolute rubbish". Deputy Prime Minister Michael McCormack said he was sorry if anyone had been let down or not felt supported, in a five-minute address during the meeting.

Morrison was criticised for his handling of a press conference on 23 March 2021 addressing the issue of sexual assault within Parliament House, during which he told reporters that an individual at News Corp was under investigation for harassment. He said to News Corp journalists "Right now, you would be aware that in your own organisation that there is a person who has had a complaint made against them of harassment of a woman in a women's toilet." After News Corp chairman Michael Miller rejected the claim and made a statement that no employee was under such investigation, Morrison issued an apology and acknowledged that the incident he described did not happen.

Cabinet changes were announced on 29 March 2021, with Reynolds and Porter moved but remaining in Cabinet, and the number of women in Cabinet increased from six to seven. Morrison also announced a new cabinet taskforce on women's equality, safety, economic security, health and wellbeing, to be co-chaired by Morrison and the Minister for Women, Marise Payne, and will include all women from the ministry as well as Treasurer Josh Frydenberg and Finance Minister Simon Birmingham.

The government announced in late March 2021 that it would convene a national summit to set new goals to prevent violence against women, at a date to be determined.

Adelaide radio announcer Jeremy Cordeaux was sacked by FIVEaa in March 2021 following on-air comments about Higgins, in which he described her as "a silly little girl who got drunk".

=== 2022 ===
On 9 February 2022, Higgins and Grace Tame addressed the National Press Club of Australia, which garnered a huge amount of coverage in the press and on social media. Both women advocated strongly for structural change, saying the time for talking had passed. Higgins said that the national plan to reduce violence against women was too vaguely worded, and needed "clearer action and firm targets".

The ACT Government is set to conduct an inquiry into the matter after a letter between the Territory's Prosecutor and Chief of Police stated that they were being targeted by a campaign to not prosecute the Lehrmann case.

=== 2023 ===
In 2023, Bruce Lehrmann filed defamation proceedings against the ABC, Network 10 and News Corp in regards to their coverage of the rape allegations made against him by Brittany Higgins, In May 2023, Lehrmann and News Corp settled out of court. The other cases are set to be heard in the federal court. The new case follows the dismissal of the rape allegations against Lehrmann as the criminal suit fell apart after the trial was abandoned after accusations of juror misconduct. An investigation into the trial has also begun and is being chaired by former Queensland Supreme Court judge, Walter Sofronoff. Already, the Director of Public Prosecutions in the ACT, Shane Drumgold, has been criticised for his handling over the case, including breaching the Evidence Miscellaneous Provisions Act.

In June 2023, The Australian reported that Labor Senator for the ACT Katy Gallagher was aware of Higgins' rape allegations several days before they were publicly reported. Members of the Liberal Party accused Gallagher of misleading parliament when she told the Senate, in June 2021, that "no one had any knowledge" of Higgins' allegations before they were aired publicly. Gallagher denied any wrongdoing, and rejected the implication that she was involved in making Higgins' allegations publicly known.

On 14 June 2023, during a Senate speech by Liberal Senator for Victoria David Van about respect in parliament, independent Senator for Victoria Lidia Thorpe interjected to accuse Van of harassing and sexually assaulting her. The following day, Thorpe alleged that she had been cornered and "inappropriately touched" by a man in a stairwell in Parliament House. On the same day, former Liberal Senator Amanda Stoker claimed that Van squeezed her bottom twice in a parliamentary office in November 2020, although she had regarded the matter as resolved after Van apologised. Liberal Party leader Peter Dutton moved to expel Van from the Liberal Party on the basis of these two allegations, plus one further allegation from a third woman regarding Van's behaviour, the details of which remain unknown. Van denied the allegations against him, and resigned from the Liberal Party on 17 June to sit on the crossbench.

In July, the ACT government released the Sofronoff report early, after it was given to the media. The report heavily criticised Drumgold, accusing him of making baseless allegations, lying to the ACT's chief justice, and losing objectivity and not acting with fairness and detachment. Drumgold subsequently took legal action against the ACT government and the board of inquiry, saying he was denied natural justice, and calling for the findings of the inquiry to be struck out or found to be invalid. A Victorian judge, Stephen Kaye, was appointed to hear the case.

=== 2026 ===
In 2026, Selina Miles released the documentary Silenced, which is about how defamation laws have become weaponised by alleged perpetrators against women for speaking out. International human rights lawyer Jennifer Robinson shows how the legal system is used to victimise and discredit survivors, including Higgins, Catalina Ruiz-Navarro and Amber Heard. The film is based on Robinson's book How Many More Women? and Robinson's work is framed through the personal inspiration of her grandmother, a sexual assault survivor. Robinson discussed the documentary's themes on ABC Radio's Overnights, on the ABC podcast Ladies We Need To Talk.

In June 2026, Bruce Lehrman lost a legal bid to subpoena a copy of the documentary, all raw b-roll and unused footage, and a schedule of the film's distribution from producers. Lehrmann's solicitor, Zali Burrows, argued the film could be prejudicial to potential jurors in Lehrman's rape trial in Queensland. Judge Richards ruled "there is no legitimate forensic purpose in this subpoena".

== See also ==
- 2021 March 4 Justice
- Me Too movement
- Weinstein effect
- List of political controversies in Australia
