= Michael Tame =

Australian cricketer

Personal information
- Full name: Michael Philip Tame
- Born: 6 January 1956 (age 70); Hobart, Tasmania, Australia
- Batting: Right-handed
- Bowling: Right-arm fast-medium
- Role: Bowler
- Relatives: Grace Tame (daughter)

Domestic team information
- Years: Team
- 1984/85–1986/87: Tasmania

Career statistics
Competition	First-class	List A
Matches	8	8
Runs scored	159	49
Batting average	15.90	16.33
100s/50s	0/0	0/0
Top score	35*	33
Balls bowled	1,300	426
Wickets	16	6
Bowling average	51.62	50.66
5 wickets in innings	1	0
10 wickets in match	0	0
Best bowling	5/74	2/11
Catches/stumpings	2/–	2/–
- Source: Cricinfo, 10 September 2009

Michael Philip Tame (born 6 January 1956) is a former Australian cricketer who played first-class cricket for Tasmania from 1984 to 1987. He also played in the Tasmanian Grade Cricket competition for Clarence District Cricket Club. He is the father of Grace Tame, Australian of the Year 2021.

== Cricket career ==
Tame was an all rounder best known for his right-arm fast-medium bowling, who over a three-year career span took 16 first-class wickets at an average of 51.62. He won the TCA Medal for best Tasmanian Grade cricketer in the 1982–83 season. He made his first-class debut in a rain-affected Sheffield Shield match played at the TCA Ground in Hobart against South Australia on 20 December 1984. He took his first wicket in that match, dismissing Glenn Bishop for 88, to break a second wicket partnership that had been worth 126 runs.

He went on to represent Tasmania eight times at first-class level, with his best bowling return of 5/74 coming in his second match, played against New South Wales at the No. 1 Sports Ground, Newcastle. In a remarkable spell of bowling that would prove to be the highlight of his career, he achieved swing and pace to dismiss Greg Matthews, Imran Khan, Steve Waugh, Phil Marks and Bob Holland, four of whom were Test cricketers. He also played eight List A cricket matches for Tasmania, but never excelled in that format. He failed to recreate the form of that productive spell of bowling in Newcastle, and by the end of 1987 he had been dropped from the Tasmanian side.

Tame continues to be involved with Clarence District Cricket Club, with whom he won four TCA Premierships.
