= Scott Kremerskothen =

Australian cricketer (born 1979)

Personal information
- Full name: Scott Paul Kremerskothen
- Born: 5 January 1979 (age 47); Launceston, Tasmania, Australia
- Nickname: Slick
- Height: 185 cm (6 ft 1 in)
- Batting: Left-handed
- Bowling: Right-arm medium
- Role: Batsman

Domestic team information
- Years: Team
- 1998/99–2005/06: Tasmania

Career statistics
Competition	First-class	LA
Matches	37	44
Runs scored	1,266	573
Batting average	26.93	19.75
100s/50s	0/5	0/1
Top score	82*	64
Balls bowled	2,733	1,202
Wickets	44	31
Bowling average	36.00	35.25
5 wickets in innings	0	0
10 wickets in match	0	0
Best bowling	4/63	3/33
Catches/stumpings	25/–	15/–
- Source: Cricinfo, 4 January 2011

Scott Paul Kremerskothen (born 5 January 1979) is an Australian former cricketer who played for Tasmania. He played his club cricket for Clarence District Cricket Club.

Kremerskothen is an all-rounder who bats well in the middle order, and can get the ball to move both ways off the pitch with his medium pace bowling. He was a regular feature in the Tasmania line-up in the early years of the 21st century, however he became yet another victim of the Tasmania's 2006 injury crisis, and missed most of the season. He has not represented the team since.
