= Samantha Maiden =

Australian political journalist

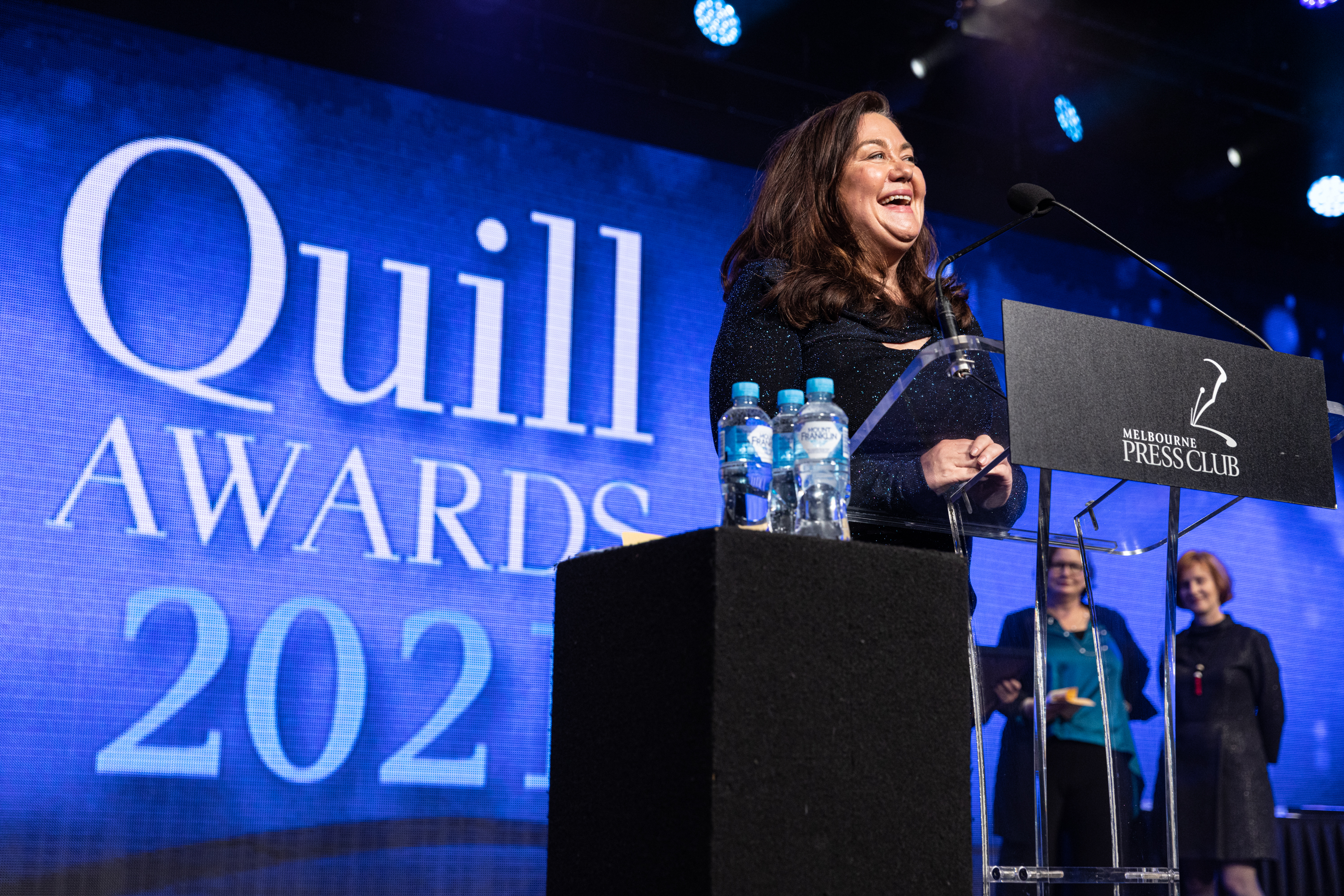
- Maiden accepts Graham Perkin Australian Journalist of the Year award in March 2022.
- Born: Samantha Louise Maiden; Adelaide, South Australia
- Education: University of South Australia
- Occupation: Journalist
- Years active: 1994–present
- Children: 3
- Relatives: Sharri Markson (sister)
- Awards: Gold Walkley (2021); Graham Perkin Australian Journalist of the Year (2021)

Samantha Louise Maiden is an Australian political journalist. She is currently political editor for news.com.au, a subsidiary of News Corp Australia.

== Early life and education ==
Maiden was born in Adelaide.

As a student at the University of Adelaide in 1992, she edited On Dit, the student newspaper.

== Career ==
Maiden has worked as a journalist since 1994.

She moved to Canberra to work as a political correspondent in 1998. She wrote for a number of News Corp Sunday papers, including The Sunday Telegraph, Sunday Herald Sun and Sunday Mail. Maiden was known for breaking exclusive political stories for News Corp papers. She also appeared as a commentator on television news programs, including Today and Pyne & Marles.

In 2016, Maiden said that Peter Dutton, the Minister for Immigration and Border Protection, had inadvertently sent a text message describing her as a "mad fucking witch" directly to her, instead of a colleague, after Maiden wrote a critical opinion piece. The "witch incident" became internationally significant when Marvel's dark hero Jessica Jones tweeted encouragement to Maiden "welcoming her to the club (of mad fucking witches)".

She joined Sky News Australia as political reporter in 2017, first appearing on 30 January 2017. She resigned from Sky News in June 2018.

She then wrote for the online newspaper The New Daily.

In April 2020 Maiden returned to News Corp Australia as political editor of its news website news.com.au.

== Awards ==
- 2021: Kennedy Award, for Journalist of the Year as well as for outstanding investigative journalism and outstanding political reporting
- 2021: Gold Walkley for "Open secret: The Brittany Higgins story"
- 2021: Our Watch Award, for excellence in reporting on violence against women and children, for her reporting of the Brittany Higgins story
- 2021: Melbourne Press Club Graham Perkin Australian Journalist of the Year Award for coverage of abuse in Parliament House.

== Personal life ==
On 6 April 2016, Maiden pleaded guilty to a drink driving charge and two "fail to obey police" charges in Goulburn Local Court, having recorded a blood alcohol reading of 0.136 on 20 March 2016. On 18 May 2016, Maiden was given a 12-month good behaviour bond, disqualified from driving for seven months, and fined $1000. Her sister is Sky News host Sharri Markson.
