= Grace Tame =

Australian activist (born 1994)

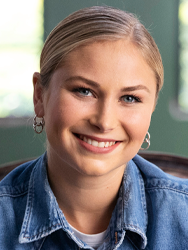
- Tame c. 2021
- Born: 28 December 1994 (age 31); Hobart, Tasmania, Australia
- Education: Santa Barbara City College
- Occupations: Artist and yoga teacher
- Known for: Sexual assault survivor advocacy
- Spouse: Spencer Breslin (m. 2017; div. 2021)
- Partner: Max Heerey (2020)
- Parents: Michael Tame (father); Penelope Plaschke (mother)
- Awards: Tasmanian Australian of the Year (2020); Australian of the Year (2021)

Grace Tame (born 28 December 1994) is an Australian activist. She is best known as the recipient of the 2021 Australian of the Year award, which she received as an "advocate for survivors of sexual assault".

Growing up in Hobart, Tasmania, Tame attended St Michael's Collegiate School, where she was a victim of repeated child sexual abuse by one of her teachers in 2010. Tame relocated to California in 2013, and returned to Australia in 2020.

Beginning in 2018, Tame co-founded the #LetHerSpeak campaign, in response to a Tasmanian gag law that prevented her from publicly identifying as a sexual assault survivor. Supported by the broader MeToo movement, the campaign succeeded in: securing Tame special leave from the Supreme Court of Tasmania, letting her share her experience with the media in 2019; and reforming Tasmanian law in 2020, to allow adult survivors of sexual assault to self-identify in the media. For her activism, Tame was named the 2021 Australian of the Year, becoming the first Tasmanian to win the award.

Tame has since continued her advocacy for sexual abuse survivors and journalistic ethics, including support of Brittany Higgins, and criticism of Rupert Murdoch's News Corp. Since 2025, Tame has also attracted media attention for her criticism of Israel. In February 2026, when Israeli President Isaac Herzog visited Sydney in the aftermath of the Bondi Beach shooting, Tame addressed a protest and led a chant that included the phrase "globalise the intifada". Later that month, Prime Minister Anthony Albanese used the word "difficult" to describe Tame, provoking a backlash.

== Early life ==
Tame was born in Hobart in 1994. Her father is former Tasmanian cricketer Michael Tame, while her mother is former broadcaster Penny Tame.

== Abuse and aftermath ==
Tame was a dual-scholarship holder at St Michael's Collegiate girls' school in Hobart, and had been diagnosed with anorexia in Year 10. She has stated that at age 15 she was groomed and then repeatedly sexually abused by her 58-year-old teacher, Nicolaas Bester. Tame disclosed to Bester that she was a survivor of child-on-child sexual abuse, having been sexually assaulted at age 6 by an older boy, and he used that information to recreate the abuse. He was found in possession of child pornography. Although the school was found to have had multiple opportunities to intervene, the abuse did not stop until 2011, when Tame reported her attacker.

Bester was arrested and convicted of the offence of "maintaining a sexual relationship with someone under the age of 17", a crime, Tame argued, that needed to be renamed as in other jurisdictions, due to its misleading use of the word "relationship" for abuse. Bester was also sentenced for the aforementioned possession of child pornography. In sentencing Tame's abuser, Justice Helen Wood said Tame had been "particularly vulnerable given her mental state" and that her abuser "knew her psychological condition was precarious" and had "betrayed the trust of the child's parents and the school's trust in an utterly blatant fashion". At the time of the abuse, Tame had undiagnosed autism spectrum disorder.

In 2013, Tame dropped out of St Michael's Collegiate and later re-enrolled at a different high school. She then moved to the United States, where she graduated from Santa Barbara City College with degrees in theatre arts and liberal arts.

In 2017, social commentator Bettina Arndt conducted an interview with Tame's abuser, claiming "sexually provocative behaviour from female students". Tame criticised Arndt for supporting her abuser, accusing her of "trivialising" and "laughing off" his crime, saying, "Not only is the interview disturbing because it gives a platform to a paedophile. It's not a truthful interview". Arndt did not seek out Tame for her side of the story, and published her name and photo without consent. Her abuser had spoken publicly about the case many times, but Tame was gagged by a Tasmanian law that prevents victims from revealing their identities to the media. He was subsequently jailed again for the production of child exploitation material, after describing online how he sexually abused Tame.

== Advocacy ==
=== Evidence Act reform ===
Tasmania's Evidence Act had prohibited the publication of information identifying survivors of sexual assault since 2001. In practice, this prevented Tame and other survivors from speaking publicly about their experiences, even as Tame's abuser bragged about his crimes on social media. Tame's case led to journalist and sexual assault survivor advocate Nina Funnell working alongside Tame to create a campaign called #LetHerSpeak, in partnership with Marque Lawyers and End Rape on Campus Australia, seeking to overturn this law and a similar law in the Northern Territory. The campaign attracted global support from celebrities including Alyssa Milano, Tara Moss and John Cleese, and from leaders of the MeToo movement. In August 2019, Tame spoke out for the first time after the campaign obtained a court order on her behalf through the Supreme Court of Tasmania winning Tame an exemption from the gag law. She was the first female sexual assault survivor in Tasmania to win a court order to speak about her experience.

In October 2019, in response to the #LetHerSpeak campaign led by Funnell and featuring Tame, Attorney-General of Tasmania Elise Archer announced that legislation would be amended to allow sexual assault survivors to publicly speak out. Archer also announced planned changes to the wording of the crime noting that "the word relationship has connotations of consent". In April 2020, the law was changed in Tasmania, allowing survivors to speak out.

Tame has become an advocate for others, focusing on helping them understand grooming and psychological manipulation and breaking down the stigma associated with sexual assault. She has assisted the Los Angeles Human Trafficking Squad with understanding how child grooming works. Tame advocates education as a means of primary prevention of child sex abuse, rather than too heavily focusing on responses, which can "fuel the unconscious belief that child sexual abuse is just a fact of life that we have to accept in our society". Tame wants to eradicate victim blaming and normalise speaking out, and says greater consistency is needed between federal and state laws.

On 15 March 2021, Tame led the Women's March4Justice event in Hobart.

=== Brittany Higgins allegations ===
On 9 February 2022, Tame and former Liberal Party parliamentary staffer and alleged rape survivor Brittany Higgins gave an address at the National Press Club of Australia, which sold out quickly and garnered a huge amount of coverage in the press and on social media. In her talk, Tame revealed that a "senior member" of a government-funded organisation had phoned her and, she felt, in a threatening way, asked her not to criticise the Prime Minister, Scott Morrison, in her outgoing Australian of the Year speech, in the light of the forthcoming election. (Morrison denied any involvement in or knowledge of the request.) Both women advocated strongly for structural change, saying the time for talking was past.

=== The media ===
At an Australia Day Eve event honouring the 2025 Australian of the Year, Senior Australian of the Year, Young Australian of the Year and Australian Local Hero, hosted by prime minister Anthony Albanese, Tame wore a T-shirt that read "Fuck Murdoch" when she was greeted by the Prime Minister. Tame said "[The T-shirt is] clearly not just about Murdoch, it's the obscene greed, inhumanity and disconnection that he symbolises, which are destroying our planet". Tame told the ABC that the awards program was a "platform for making change".

=== Pro-Palestine advocacy ===
Following the 2025 Capital Jewish Museum shooting in Washington, Tame shared a social media post that said "It's despicable, and nothing short of journalistic malpractice, that the media class is scrambling to reframe the shooting that targeted two Israeli state officials as a random anti-Semitic attack". Tame further posted that Israel was guilty of genocide and ethnic cleansing and accused supporters of Israel of participating in the "legitimisation of Jewish supremacist ethnonationalism". Sportswear company Nike terminated its partnership with her in June 2025, citing concerns of "antisemitism". The Jewish Council of Australia supported Tame, saying, her "criticisms are in no way antisemitic".

In February 2026, during a protest against a visit by Israeli president Isaac Herzog, Tame described Herzog as a man who "signed his name on bombs that were used to kill women and men and children. And a man who also said, and I quote, 'There are no innocent civilians in Gaza'". She led protesters in a chant "from Gadigal to Gaza, globalise the intifada!" Tame subsequently said an interview with ABC Radio Sydney that she understood the phrase "globalise the Intifada" to be a call for widespread resistance against the actions of the Israeli state.

In the weeks prior to the protest against Herzog, the NSW state government had stated its intention to outlaw the phrase "globalise the Intifada" under revised hate speech laws, following the 2025 Bondi Beach shooting. Tame was criticised by federal and state MPs for her use of the phrase. Labor premier Chris Minns said "a violent terrorist uprising, that's what the consequences of 'globalise the intifada' mean", while Liberal shadow minister Melissa McIntosh called it a "disgusting display of antisemitism", which was "antithetical to the principles of the Australian of the Year award". The National Council of Jewish Women of Australia and former deputy prime minister Barnaby Joyce also called for the award to be rescinded. Australian Greens leader Larissa Waters said Tame "deserves every accolade that she's received". In response, Tame told her social media followers "politicians and the press can deflect on me all they like, but I'm not the story". She has said her pro-Palestinian activism have led to a "smear campaign" against her, with speaking engagements and opportunities being cancelled or rescinded.

In March 2026, in response to an interview question on sexual violence during the October 7 attacks, Tame stated that "those things have been de-bunked" and that "she wouldn't sink to the level of entertaining any propaganda". In response she was criticised by the Israeli embassy in Canberra and the Executive Council of Australian Jewry. Lynda Ben-Menashe, the president of the National Council of Jewish Women Australia stated that her comments amounted to denial of the October 7 attacks. Tame would later apologize for her comments in September of that same year. She explained in a video apology that her comments were "misinterpreted to mean that [she] disbelieve[s] Israeli survivors of sexual violence."

=== Grace Tame Foundation ===
In December 2021, Tame founded the Grace Tame Foundation which aims for cultural and structural change to eradicate sexual abuse of children. Tame, Michresistance, Michael Bradley and Scarlett Franks are board directors for the foundation.

In April 2026, the foundation closed down due to a lack of long term funding.

== Writing ==
In September 2022 her memoir, The Ninth Life of a Diamond Miner, was published by Macmillan Australia. It was shortlisted for the Nonfiction prize at the 2023 Indie Book Awards.

== Media work ==
The ABC broadcast a four-part podcast and YouTube series titled Autistic AF with Grace Tame in June 2026. In the series Tame speaks about her experience of autism, discusses the latest research and interviews women with autism.

== Recognition and public profile ==
=== 2021 Australian of the Year ===
In October 2020, Tame was named Tasmanian Australian of the Year 2021. She said, "I could be wrong but I don't think that a survivor of rape has ever been awarded in such a way and that's huge . . . It's hugely empowering for that community recognising and normalising the act of speaking out. There's no shame in surviving. The shame sits at the feet of predators, of perpetrators of these crimes."

On the eve of Australia Day 2021, she was named Australian of the Year. The panel said, "Grace has demonstrated extraordinary courage, using her voice to push for legal reform and raise public awareness about the impacts of sexual violence". She is the first Tasmanian recipient of the award and the first as a public survivor of sexual assault. Upon receiving the award, she said "All survivors of child sexual abuse, this is for us... When we share, we heal. Together we can end child sexual abuse. I remember him saying, 'Don't make a sound.' Well, hear me now, using my voice amongst a chorus of voices that will not be silenced." Her speech was praised as "powerful" and "extraordinary".

=== Other recognition ===
In 2021, Tame was named as one of Time magazine's Next Generation Leaders, and by the Australian Financial Review as one of the "10 most culturally powerful people in Australia in 2021".

Tame was featured on the cover of the May 2021 Australian issue of Marie Claire magazine. She was the first non-celebrity to appear on the magazine's cover in its 25-year history.

A portrait of Tame by Kirsty Neilson was a finalist in the 2021 Archibald Prize. Neilson was inspired by Tame's passion, strength, and bravery in playing an instrumental role in changing Tasmania's gag law.

=== Nike ambassadorship ===
In January 2025, Tame was appointed a brand ambassador for the Nike company. She was removed from the position in early June 2025 after making social media posts about Israel and Palestine. Nike issued a statement that "Grace and Nike have mutually agreed to part ways" and wished Tame well. It did not provide a reason for the decision. Nike later posted a statement against discrimination and anti-semitism.

== Personal life ==
In 2017, Tame married American actor Spencer Breslin. They divorced in 2021. Since late 2020, she has been in a relationship with Tasmanian Max Heerey. Tame met Heerey through the running and cycling app Strava. On 22 January 2022, Tame announced her engagement to Heerey via Instagram and Twitter. She has referred to Heerey as her "biggest supporter" and "true soulmate".

Tame is a visual artist, and her clientèle has included actor John Cleese, and musician Martin Gore. She is also a yoga teacher and long-distance runner, having won the 2020 Ross Marathon in a course record time.

She has a younger brother, Oscar, whom she calls her "little hero", saying, "He came into the world right when the abuse started, and pardon the pun, but he was a literal saving grace".

In February 2026, Prime Minister Anthony Albanese used the word "difficult" to describe Tame, provoking a backlash.
