= Walter Sofronoff =

Australian judge

The Honourable Walter Sofronoff KC

President of the Queensland Court of Appeal
- In office 3 April 2017 – 20 May 2022
- Preceded by: Margaret McMurdo
- Succeeded by: Debra Mullins

Solicitor-General of Queensland
- In office 17 February 2005 – 13 March 2014
- Preceded by: Patrick Keane KC
- Succeeded by: Peter Dunning KC

Personal details
- Education: Anglican Church Grammar School; University of Queensland

Walter Sofronoff KC is an Australian jurist and lawyer who in 2025 was found by the ACT Integrity Commission and the Federal Court of Australia to have engaged in Serious Corrupt Conduct during his appointment as sole Commissioner in the 2023 Board of Inquiry into the ACT Criminal Justice System. Prior to this, he served as the President of the Queensland Court of Appeal from 2017 to 2022 and as the Solicitor-General of Queensland from 2005 to 2014.

== Early life and education ==
Sofronoff attended the Anglican Church Grammar School in Brisbane, and completed a Bachelor of Arts and Bachelor of Laws (Honours) at the University of Queensland in 1976.

== Career ==
Sofronoff was called to the Bar in 1977 and took silk in 1988.

He served as a member from 1980 until 1982, vice-president from 1992 until 1994 and president from 1994 until 1996 of the Bar Association of Queensland Committee. He has also been a member of the Queensland Incorporated Council of Law Reporting from 1999 until 2004, president of the Queensland Anti-Discrimination Tribunal from 2001 until 2005, a member of the Royal Australian Navy Reserve from 2003 until 2014 and a member of The University of Queensland Law School Advisory Board from 2014. In 1999, Mr Sofronoff was an adjunct professor of law at The University of Queensland.

=== Solicitor-General of Queensland ===
Sofronoff served as the Solicitor-General of Queensland from 2005 to 2014. He was involved in a number of high-profile cases, including those involving surgeon Jayant Patel and the Aurukun Nine, nine men convicted of the gang rape of a 10-year-old girl in far north Queensland. He resigned as solicitor-general in 2014 amid tensions between the Newman government and the legal fraternity that resulted from the appointment of Tim Carmody as Chief Justice of the Supreme Court of Queensland.

In 2016, Sofronoff was responsible for the successful High Court appeal that overturned the Queensland Court of Appeal's decision to downgrade Gerard Baden-Clay's murder conviction to manslaughter. Although it is normal practice for a sitting solicitor-general to lead High Court appeals, Sofronoff was briefed to appear instead of his successor and solicitor-general at the time, Peter Dunning QC. After the appeal, it was reported by The Guardian Australia that Sofronoff had charged the Queensland government just $327 plus GST to run the appeal, "despite a QC of Sofronoff's standing usually commanding fees of up to $17,000 a day".

=== President of the Queensland Court of Appeal ===
He was appointed President of the Queensland Court of Appeal on 3 April 2017, after President Margaret McMurdo resigned after more than 18 years as a judge of the Court of Appeal. Sofronoff retired from the role on 20 May 2022.

=== Inquiries and reviews ===
On 11 May 2015, Sofronoff was appointed as Commissioner for the Grantham Floods Commission of Inquiry. In his written report, Sofronoff concluded that the flood "was a natural disaster and that no human agency caused it or could ever have prevented it".

Sofronoff was appointed to lead a review of Queensland's parole system in 2016. On 6 June 2022, he was appointed as Commissioner for the Commission of Inquiry into Forensic DNA Testing in Queensland.

On 22 December 2022, during the ramifications of the 2021 Australian Parliament House sexual misconduct allegations, Sofronoff was appointed to lead the Australian Capital Territory government's Board of Inquiry into the Criminal Justice System, which reviewed the circumstances surrounding the aborted prosecution of Bruce Lehrmann. Sofronoff's report was provided to the government on 31 July 2023. Sofronoff provided an advance copy of the report to journalists from the Australian who reported widely on the findings before it was provided to the government. It was reported that at the time Sofronoff handed the report to a journalist at The Australian, he was scheduled to speak at a Queensland Press Club event hosted by The Australian.

Shane Drumgold SC challenged Sofronoff's report by way of a judicial review before the ACT Supreme Court. Following a three day hearing, Kaye AJ of the ACT Supreme Court declared that all adverse findings gave rise to the apprehension that they might have been influenced by the views held and publicly expressed by Ms Albrechtsen from The Australian, and further declared that a finding that a cross-examination of Senator Linda Reynolds was grossly unethical was also legally unreasonable, and that a further finding that Drumgold made a false statement to the Chief Police Officer also failed to observe to observed natural justice. Kaye AJ further ordered that the ACT Government pay Drumgold's costs including any reserved costs save for any costs incurred in respect of the abandoned ground 1.

Evidence was provided that Sofronoff engaged in 91 telephone calls with journalists, 51 of which were with Ms Janet Albrechtsen, and 22 of which were with Mr Hedley Thomas from the Australian. The 91 telephone calls were for a total of 13 hours and 37 minutes. The telephone calls with Ms Albrechtsen were for 6 hours and 19 minutes, and with Mr Thomas for 5 hours and 8 minutes. By contrast the telephone calls with all other journalists during that period occupied a total of 2 hours and 10 minutes. It was further revealed that Albrechtsen flew to Brisbane for a private lunch with Sofronoff. It was reported that the contact with Albrechtsen was in stark contrast with that afforded other media outlets. In September 2024, the ACT Supreme Court released 1700 pages of communications, revealing complaints from other journalists, including The Australian reporting on things that did not happen. It also revealed that Sofronoff personally provided documents to Albrechtsen that he had marked "strictly confidential".

An investigation by the ACT Bar Association subsequently found that the evidence relied upon by Sofronoff to make his adverse findings did not amount to either unsatisfactory professional conduct or professional misconduct. It was reported on 6 November 2024 that The NSW Bar Association had also found no misconduct, and that Drumgold was a fit and proper person to practise law and had issued him a barristers practising certificate. It was reported that Drumgold had also commenced a PhD on accountability structures for commissioned inquiries, in the hope of preventing what went wrong in the Sofronoff Inquiry from happening again. On 16 October 2024, the Chief Minister of the ACT publicly stated that it was a mistake to appoint Mr Sofronoff to the Board of Inquiry.

=== Serious Corrupt Conduct Finding ===
On 5 April 2024, the ACT Integrity Commission published a media release, announcing that it was looking into the conduct of Sofronoff. On 13 May 2024, Integrity Commissioner Michael Adams KC released a statement stating that after a preliminary examination, he suspected on reasonable grounds, that Sofronoff's conduct may constitute corrupt conduct and had launched an investigation. On 19 March 2025, the ACT Integrity Commission released its report, finding that Sofronoff had engaged in serious corrupt conduct during the public inquiry. The report found that the ACT Supreme Court findings rendered the Sofronoff findings legally invalid for jurisdictional error, however due to the deliberate actions of Sofronoff, Drumgold was denied the opportunity to block the release of the report, a consequence the Integrity Commission found was both predictable and irreparable.

Walter Sofronoff KC appealed the ACT Integrity Commission findings that he engaged in serious corrupt conduct to the Federal Court. On 11 December 2025, the Federal Court dismissed all 12 grounds of appeal, and confirmed the finding that Sofronoff engaged in serious corrupt conduct.

== Personal life ==
Sofronoff is married. He has three children and one daughter-in-law.

Legal offices
Preceded by Margaret McMurdo	President of the Queensland Court of Appeal; 2017–present	Incumbent
