= Sharri Markson =

Australian journalist (born 1984)

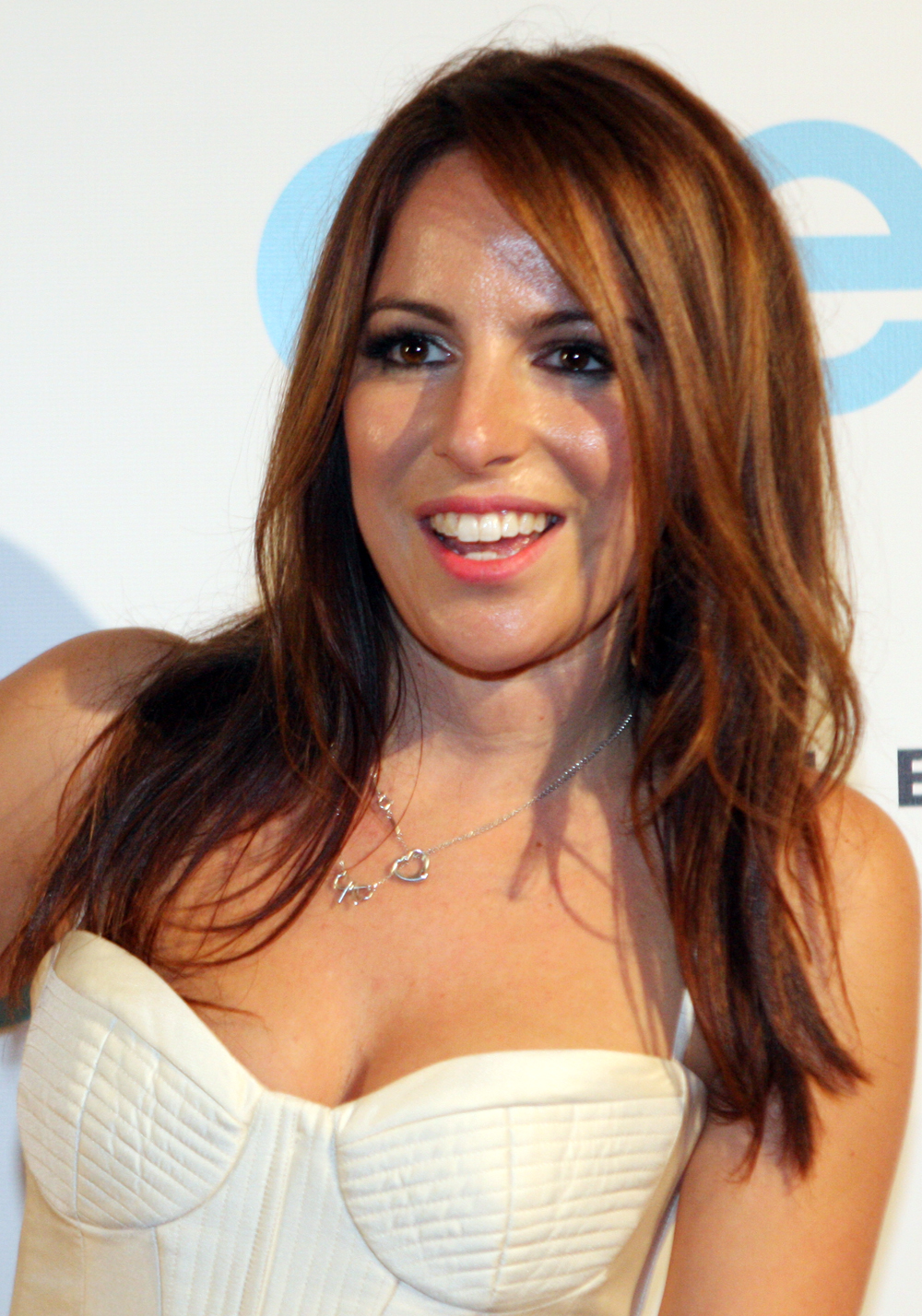
- Markson in 2013
- Born: 8 March 1984 (age 42); Sydney, New South Wales, Australia
- Occupation: Journalist
- Years active: 2000−present
- Spouse: Chaz Heitner (m. 2017)

Sharri Markson (born 8 March 1984) is an Australian journalist and author. She is investigations editor at The Australian and host of the News24 program Sharri, which airs 8–9pm Monday to Thursday. She is the winner of numerous awards in journalism, including two Walkley Awards.

== Early life ==
Markson was born and raised in Sydney to Jewish parents. Her father is celebrity promoter Max Markson. Markson attended Moriah College and Ascham School. She studied a Media/Communications degree at the University of Sydney for two years.

== Career ==
=== Early career ===
Markson began her journalism career as a copy girl at The Sunday Telegraph at the age of 16. She was promoted to the state political reporter, Canberra correspondent, and finally, chief of staff.

She twice won the Young Journalist of the Year Award and did secondments at the New York Post and The Sun in London. As political reporter for The Sunday Telegraph in Canberra, Markson revealed Tony Abbott missed the $42 billion stimulus package vote in Parliament because he fell asleep after a night of drinking.

=== Seven Network ===
Markson joined the Seven Network in 2011, and was commended in the Walkley Awards for an investigation that revealed Deputy Premier Andrew Stoner's rush to cash in on the solar-bonus scheme subsidy for solar panels on his roof after then Premier Kristina Keneally announced it was shutting down. The coverage was cited as the first scandal of the newly elected New South Wales O'Farrell government.

In 2012, she led a team of journalists who won a Walkley Award for TV news reporting. The team reported a cabinet leak that revealed the NSW government banned the sale of unleaded petrol without ethanol, to the benefit of the monopoly company, Dick Honan's Manildra Group, against departmental advice, in a move that would increase the price of petrol for consumers.

=== Cleo ===
Markson was recruited as the Australian editor of Cleo in 2013. Her tenure as editor involved launching a fight for equal pay for men and women named "Ditch the pay GAP". The magazine also ran a prominent investigation into companies that were paying women less than men by examining the financial statements of 100 Australian companies.

While editor, Markson made the decision to no longer make any direct references to sexual relations on the magazine's cover. In the same year, coverage in Cleo triggered an investigation at the University of Sydney into sexual harassment occurring during initiation ceremonies at the University's prestigious colleges.

=== The Australian ===
Markson replaced Simon Benson as media editor of The Australian newspaper in February 2014. She shifted to a senior writing role in 2015.

Markson's work has occasionally attracted controversy. In November 2015, she was detained by Israeli security officials for breaching protocol during a visit to the Ziv Medical Centre in Safed by attempting to speak with and maintain contact with a Syrian national being treated at the hospital.

She wrote stories about The Sydney Morning Herald columnist Mike Carlton's abusive and antisemitic emails and tweets to readers during the Israel-Hamas conflict in Gaza. Carlton resigned from Fairfax after being told he would be suspended over the correspondence. Fairfax's publisher, Sean Aylmer, told 2UE, "The column was fine. The issue wasn't the printing of the column. What sort of got him into trouble was the way he responded to those readers, and it was totally inappropriate, using very inappropriate language." A month after the coverage, Markson was the subject of an antisemitic threat. Online media site Mumbrella wrote that her tenure as media editor involved the aggressive pursuit of stories involving the ABC and Fairfax Media and for her reporting on Mike Carlton.

=== The Daily Telegraph ===
In September 2016, she was appointed national political editor for The Daily Telegraph.

Markson won a Walkley Award "Scoop of the Year" in 2018 alongside journalists Kylar Loussikian and Chris Dore for coverage of Barnaby Joyce's affair and "love child" with a parliamentary staffer that ultimately led to Joyce's resignation as Australia's Deputy Prime Minister. The story, "Bundle of Joyce", featured Joyce's girlfriend, Vicki Campion, walking across the street while pregnant. The story was initially met with controversy, with some journalists, commentators, and politicians claiming the affair and pregnancy should have been kept secret from the public. Markson argued the story was in the public interest. Later coverage by Markson revealed that Campion had been awarded jobs for which she was not qualified in the offices of other government politicians, and that Joyce had lied about the affair to then-Prime Minister Malcolm Turnbull. The story led to Turnbull announcing a "bonk ban" that banned ministers from having sexual relations with their staff members.

The allegations were first alluded to by Markson in an article entitled "Barnaby Joyce battles vicious innuendo as Coalition fears citizenship woe" that stated Joyce was "in the grip of a deeply personal crisis" on 21 October 2017. Serkan Ozturk of True Crime News Weekly has claimed that he first broke the story on 24 October 2017, almost six months before Markson's article. An assessment of the claim by The Guardian Australia concluded that while True Crime News Weekly did report on a series of rumours regarding Joyce, including that Joyce was having an affair and with a staffer, Markson was able to substantiate the name of the staffer and the specific details of the affair including the pregnancy. The ABC attributed the story to Markson and noted that Markson had offered Joyce and Campion a sit-down portrait as an alternative to the front-page picture that attracted controversy.

In the same year, Markson won a Kennedy Award for Journalism for Scoop of the Year and Political Journalist of the Year and the overall award for journalist of the year.

In 2018 Markson won the Sir Keith Murdoch Award for Excellence in Journalism, which was presented to her by Rupert and Lachlan Murdoch at an awards ceremony in Sydney.

As political editor of The Daily Telegraph, Markson also broke news of the impending leadership coup against Malcolm Turnbull by Peter Dutton. On 17 August 2018 Markson was the first to report Dutton was being urged to seize the leadership "within weeks" by conservative MPs unhappy with Malcolm Turnbull's leadership. She followed up her story by breaking another story the next day that Dutton was seriously considering launching a challenge for the prime ministership. The coverage of the leadership coup led Markson to jointly win (along with David Speers) the 2019 Federal Parliamentary Press Gallery Journalist of the Year Award presented by the National Press Club of Australia.

In June 2018 she attended the AIJAC-sponsored Rambam Fellowship Program in Israel, along with other journalists and politicians.

=== Sky News Live ===
Markson began hosting a self-titled weekly program on Sky News Live from 9 October 2018. As of September 2025, the program is broadcast every week night at 8 pm. The debut episode of ''Sharri'' was "reached" by 105,000 viewers over the course of an hour, according to Sky News at its original time of Monday night.

In 2019, Markson won another Kennedy Award for columnist of the year and in 2021 for Outstanding Nightly Current Affairs.

=== 2019 Federal election coverage ===
During the federal election campaign, Markson took her five-month-old baby on the campaign trail, where they travelled with the prime minister on his private plane. Markson's baby was present for an exclusive sit-down interview with Prime Minister Scott Morrison.

In May 2019, Markson described herself as being "smashed on social media" after stating on air eight days before election day that the Coalition government was in a competitive position to be re-elected. Markson's analysis defied the majority of polling and public opinion that expected an electoral victory for then-opposition leader Bill Shorten, and rather predicted the Coalition parties would come to win the election by taking a few key seats in Victoria, New South Wales, and crucially, Queensland. Markson later credited the Coalition victory to a significant turnaround by leader Scott Morrison in key marginal areas.

=== COVID-19 origins reporting ===
Markson has reported on and written extensively on the origins of COVID-19 pandemic. Her reporting has been described by The Sydney Morning Herald as being part of a counter-narrative that advances the case that the COVID-19 pandemic originated from a laboratory leak, contrary to the WHO-convened Global Study of Origins of SARS-CoV-2.

In May 2020, reporting by Markson in The Daily Telegraph claimed that the Wuhan Institute of Virology could be the source of COVID-19, citing a 15-page government dossier. The Sydney Morning Herald critiqued the reporting as intimating the dossier as originating from a Five Eyes intelligence source. In May 2021, Markson published excerpts of a document that showed Chinese military scientists "discussed the weaponisation of SARS-related coronaviruses five years before the Covid-19 pandemic". The Guardian accused Markson of promoting conspiracy theories, noting that the document cited was a book that was widely available in Chinese and that books of its nature tended to be sensational and conspiratorial. In response, Markson argued that the book was published by the Chinese Military Medical Science Press, a Chinese government-owned publishing house managed by the General Logistics Department of the People's Liberation Army. Tory Shepherd of The Guardian cited Markson's appearance on Steve Bannon's podcast, where she stated that Anthony Fauci "must answer" for his alleged involvement into research weaponising viruses, as well as on US Fox News in June 2021 as examples of Markson's reporting finding fertile ground in the right wing of the U.S media. Shepherd also cited John Lee who pointed out that "the evidence is building and you have significant proportions of the scientific, expert, political and intelligence community saying [the lab leak] is a credible theory."

On 20 September 2021, Sky News Australia broadcast a documentary by Markson entitled What Really Happened in Wuhan that featured an exclusive interview with former US president Donald Trump, former US Secretary of State Mike Pompeo and former US director of national intelligence John Ratcliffe. The documentary also featured an interview with Chinese human rights activist Wei Jingsheng, who claimed in the documentary that he attempted to warn United States authorities about COVID-19 in October 2019 after being informed of an outbreak by contacts in Beijing. The documentary attracted 260,000 viewers and was Sky News Australia's most popular program of 2021 at the time of broadcast.

In her book What Really Happened in Wuhan published by HarperCollins, Markson frames the Wuhan Institute of Virology as the "crime scene" of the COVID-19 pandemic, proposing that gain-of-function experiments and collaboration with the Chinese PLA might point to human engineering of SARS-CoV-2. However, critics in a Guardian review note that the book’s "details are deficient", its 'scientific analysis contentious", and that it often omits key "expert voices". The Guardian accuses Markson of treating "uncorroborated intelligence sources" too readily, using questionable analogies (for example misrepresenting Wei Jingsheng’s defection), and selectively citing science that supports her thesis while neglecting alternative explanations. As the review concludes, the book "raises more questions than it answers."

In July 2026, newly released excerpts from Anthony Fauci's COVID-19 diaries revealed that he sharply criticized Markson's reporting and her 2021 book What Really Happened in Wuhan, writing that "the same old crap is going on with the far right continuing to attack me" and describing her claims about his role in gain-of-function research as "a bunch of nonsense". Markson responded by asserting that "the majority of the intelligence community now concludes that Covid-19 likely originated in a Wuhan laboratory", and claimed that she had "led the way internationally exposing the role of Anthony Fauci's agency funding 65 projects at the Wuhan Institute of Virology, funnelling the money through EcoHealth Alliance".

=== Coverage of Bondi Beach terror attack ===
Markson did a deep dive on the Bondi Beach terror attack of December 2025, which was committed by father-son members of ISIS. Helped by connections within the Jewish community, which was the main target of the attacks, Markson broke numerous stories, including those which pointed to negligence on the part of Australian Prime Minister Anthony Albanese. Markson also revealed for the first time Albanese's long-standing ties to the Palestinian side of the conflict. In November 2026, a book entitled Bondi Terror was released by HarperCollins, co-written by Markson and Alex Ryvchin.

During this period, Markson was targeted by IRGC intelligence, using Operation Charming Kitten. An Iranian operative successfully penetrated the private accounts of a member of the Trump administration, someone known to Markson, who had been one of her sources during her Covid-19 reporting. The Iranian operative then used the hacked account to contact Markson, who replied to what she thought was a known source. As a result, Iranian intelligence was able to hack Markson's accounts as well, gaining access to private information about herself and her two young daughters.

== Publications ==
- What Really Happened in Wuhan: A Virus Like No Other, Countless Infections, Millions of Deaths. HarperCollins. 2021. ISBN 978-1-4607-6108-3. OCLC 1250305684.
- with Ryvchin, Alex (2026). Bondi Terror. HarperCollins. ISBN 978-1460770344; about the Bondi Beach shooting on 14 December 2025.

== Personal life ==
Markson is sister to news.com.au journalist Samantha Maiden.
