= Michael Black (judge) =

Australian judge

Michael Black AC, KC

Chief Justice of the Federal Court of Australia
- In office 1 January 1991 – 21 March 2010
- Preceded by: Sir Nigel Bowen
- Succeeded by: Patrick Keane

Personal details
- Born: 22 March 1940 (age 86) Kingdom of Egypt
- Spouse: Margaret
- Education: University of Melbourne
- Occupation: Judge
- Profession: Lawyer

Michael Eric John Black, AC, KC (born 22 March 1940) is a former Chief Justice of the Federal Court of Australia.

== Background and career ==
Black was born in the Kingdom of Egypt, where his father was serving as an officer in the Royal Air Force. He attended schools in Egypt, England, and Australia (Wesley College, Melbourne). He graduated with a Bachelor of Laws from the University of Melbourne in 1963.

In 1964, Black commenced practice at the Victorian Bar. His practice included civil jury actions as well as commercial and public law cases.

Black was appointed Queen's Counsel for Victoria in 1980 and for Tasmania in 1984. As Queen's Counsel, he specialised in appellate work, including cases in constitutional, commercial and industrial law. One of the constitutional cases was the Tasmanian Dam Case in 1983, where he represented the Tasmanian Wilderness Society. Upon the death of Queen Elizabeth II, his title changed to King's Counsel automatically.

=== Judicial and later career ===
Black was appointed Chief Justice of the Federal Court of Australia on 1 January 1991. As Chief Justice, he had, as well as his judicial duties, statutory responsibility for the administration of the Court.

In 1981, he was appointed the Foundation Chairman of the Victorian Bar's Readers Course, the Bar's pioneering course of instruction for new barristers, and later served as the representative of the Victorian Bar on the Board of the Leo Cussen Institute for Continuing Legal Education. As Chief Justice, he actively supported the Federal Court's work in the field of judicial education. He was also Chair of the Advisory Committee for introduction of the Juris Doctor degree at Melbourne Law School. He retired as Chief Justice on 21 March 2010 and was succeeded by Patrick Keane.

== Honours ==
On Australia Day, 1998, Black was appointed a Companion of the Order of Australia for service to the law, to the legal profession and to the judiciary.

== Personal life ==
Black's interests outside the law include architecture, history, and maritime matters.

Legal offices
Preceded by Sir Nigel Bowen	Chief Justice of the Federal Court of Australia; 1991–2010	Succeeded by Patrick Keane
