= Solicitor-General of Queensland =

Second Law Officer of Queensland

- Incumbent; Gim Del Villar KC since 25 July 2022
- Department of Justice
- Appointer: Governor of Queensland
- Term length: 5 years
- Inaugural holder: Thomas Byrnes
- Formation: 12 August 1890

The Solicitor-General of Queensland, known informally as the Solicitor-General, is the state's Second Law Officer, and the deputy of the Attorney-General. The Solicitor-General can exercise the powers of the Attorney-General in their absence. The Solicitor-General acts alongside the Crown Advocate and Crown Solicitor, and serves as one of the legal and constitutional advisers of the Crown and its government in the Australian state of Queensland.

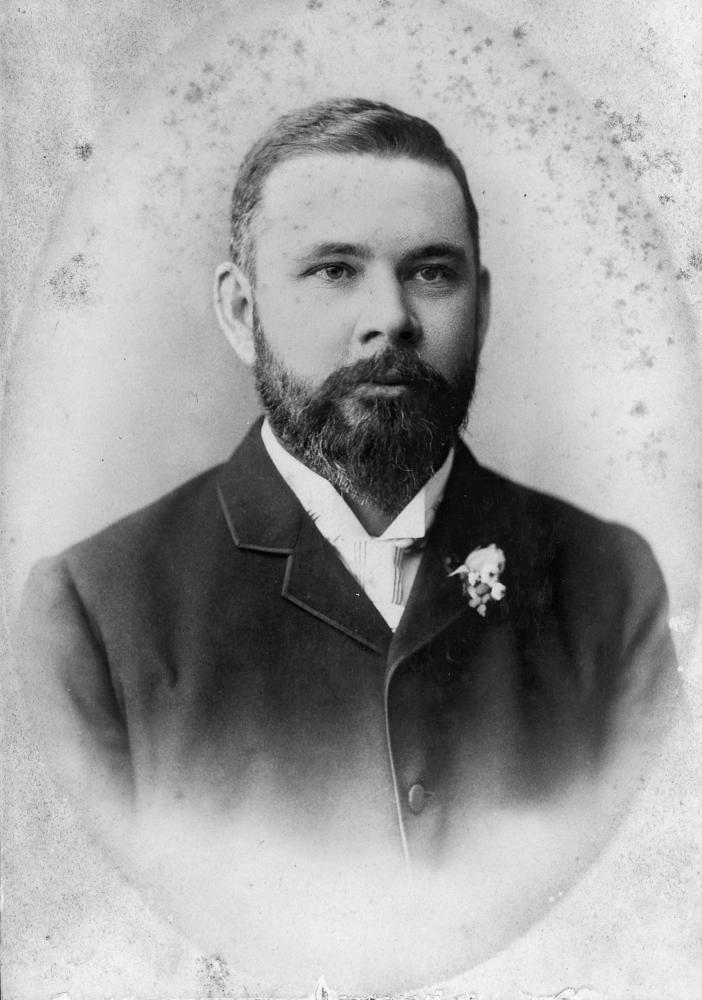
Thomas Joseph Byrnes, Queensland's first Solicitor-General

The Solicitor-General is addressed in court as "Mr/Ms Solicitor". Despite the title, the position may only be filled by a barrister of at least ten years standing, for a period of five years. The inaugural Solicitor-General was Thomas Byrnes, who served from 12 August 1890 to 13 March 1893. The position was then vacant until 1922, when William Webb was appointed. The current Solicitor-General is Gim Del Villar KC.

== History and function ==
The relevant Solicitor-General Act 1985 (Qld) (the act) provides for the office of Solicitor-General. The act provides for an appointment for a term not exceeding five years, with the possibility of renewal. A candidate for Solicitor-General must be a barrister of no less than 10 years. The act provides the functions of the Solicitor-General are to act primarily for the Crown, state, or other person as requested by the Attorney-General for the benefit of the Government of Queensland.

== Office-holders (1890–present) ==
Name	Appointed	Concluded	Comments	Notes
Thomas Byrnes	12 August 1890	13 March 1893	Appointed Attorney-General of Queensland and then Premier of Queensland	
position vacant 13 March 1893 to 11 April 1922
William Webb KBE	11 April 1922	16 April 1925	Appointed a Justice of the Supreme Court of Queensland and then a Justice of the High Court of Australia	
Hubert Henchman KC	5 August 1937	31 December 1945	Former Crown Solicitor	
William Hamilton QC	1 January 1946	31 December 1954	Former Crown Solicitor	
William Ryan	1 January 1955	19 March 1970		
Thomas Parslow QC	21 January 1971	14 July 1980	Former Crown Solicitor	
Denis Galligan QC	14 August 1980	29 February 1984	Former Crown Solicitor	
Kenneth Mackenzie	20 June 1985	10 April 1989	Appointed a Justice of the Supreme Court of Queensland	
Geoffrey Davies AO	31 October 1989	13 December 1991	Appointed a Justice the Queensland Court of Appeal	
Patrick Keane KC	13 December 1992	17 February 2005	Appointed a Justice of the High Court of Australia	
Walter Sofronoff KC	17 February 2017	13 March 2014	Appointed a Justice of and President of the Queensland Court of Appeal	
Peter Dunning KC	10 April 2014	10 April 2019		
Sandy Thompson KC	11 April 2019	7 July 2022		
Gim Del Villar KC	25 July 2022	Incumbent		
