= News.com.au =

Australian news website

news.com.au
- Format: Online newspaper
- Owner: News Corp Australia
- Editor: Kerry Warren
- Deputy editor: Liz Burke
- News editor: Daniel Peters; Ben Graham; Shannon Molloy
- Photo editor: Victoria Nielsen
- Website: news.com.au

News.com.au (stylised in all lowercase) is an Australian website owned by News Corp Australia. It had 9.6 million readers in April 2019 and covers national and international news, lifestyle, travel, entertainment, technology, finance and sport.

== Staff ==
The organisation employs about 80 journalists, among them Walkley award-winning journalist Samantha Maiden as national political editor, and Joe Hildebrand as a columnist.

== Web analytics ==
According to third-party web analytics providers Alexa Internet, news.com.au was the 12th-most-visited website in Australia in March 2022. On the web analytics platform Similarweb, news.com.au was ranked the 12th-most-visited website in Australia in January 2025 and number one in news and media publishers in Australia. Similarweb also stated that the website attracted more than 74 million visitors in January 2025. Nielsen Online Ratings rated news.com.au as Australia's most popular news website as of January 2015.

Whilst frequently ranked as the most visited Australian news website in Australia in 2019, news.com.au had later become the third-most-visited news website in Australia after ABC News Online and Daily Mail Australia by June 2020.

In November 2024, news.com.au was shown to be the second-most-read news media of any format in Australia from an Ipsos iris ranking.

== Awards ==
- Walkley Awards 2021: June Andrews Women's Leadership in Media – 'Let Her Speak'
- Our Watch Award 2021 – Samantha Maiden for her Brittany Higgins exclusive
- Mumbrella Publish Awards 2021: Journalist of the Year – Samantha Maiden
- Mumbrella Publish Awards 2021: Single Article of the Year – Samantha Maiden for her report on Brittany Higgins
- B&T's Women In Media Awards 2021: Woman of the Year – Nina Funnell for LetHerSpeak
- B&T's Women In Media Awards 2021: Glass Ceiling Award – Nina Funnell
- B&T's Women In Media Awards 2021: Journalist of the Year – Nina Funnell

== See also ==
- Mass media in Australia
- Journalism in Australia
