= Hubert Henchman =

Former Solicitor-General of Queensland

Hubert Henchman KC
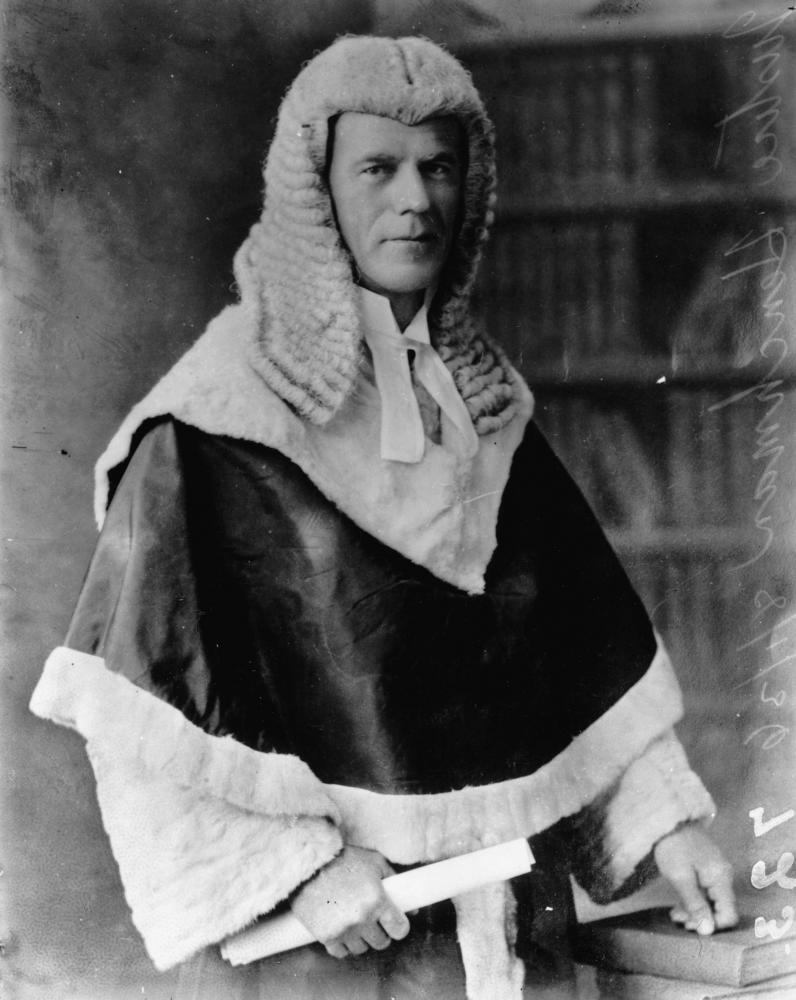

Solicitor-General of Queensland
- In office 5 August 1937 – 31 December 1945

Crown Solicitor of Queensland
- In office 2 March 1923 – 4 August 1937

Hubert James Hungerford Henchman KC (29 August 1876 – 18 February 1963) was an Australian barrister and public servant who served as the Solicitor-General of Queensland from 5 August 1937 to 31 December 1945. Henchman also served as the Crown Solicitor of Queensland from 2 March 1923 to 4 August 1937. Henchman was born in London to William and Jane Henchman, coming to Australia in 1878 where he resided in Melbourne. He later resided in Rockhampton in 1883, where his father would become a Judge of the District Court. Henchman married wife Nelsey Ridgeway in 1915. He died in Brisbane in 1963.
