= Patrick Keane =

Australian and international judge

The Honourable Patrick Anthony Keane AC KC

Non-permanent judge of Hong Kong Court of Final Appeal
- Incumbent
- Assumed office 6 April 2023
- Appointed by: John Lee Ka-chiu

Justice of the High Court of Australia
- In office 1 March 2013 – October 2022
- Nominated by: Julia Gillard
- Appointed by: Quentin Bryce
- Preceded by: Dyson Heydon
- Succeeded by: Jayne Jagot

Chief Justice of the Federal Court of Australia
- In office 22 March 2010 – 28 February 2013
- Preceded by: Michael Black
- Succeeded by: James Allsop

Solicitor-General of Queensland
- In office 13 December 1992 – 17 February 2005
- Preceded by: Geoffrey Davies
- Succeeded by: Walter Sofronoff

Personal details
- Born: 26 October 1952 (age 74) Brisbane, Queensland
- Spouse: Shelley Keane
- Children: Patrick Conan Keane; David Daniel Keane; Michael Joseph Keane
- Education: University of Queensland; University of Oxford
- Occupation: Barrister; judge
- Website: https://patrickkeaneackc.com

Patrick Anthony Keane (born 26 October 1952) is an Australian judge currently serving as a non-permanent judge of the Hong Kong Court of Final Appeal since 6 April 2023, after his retirement as a Justice of the High Court of Australia. He is currently the Chair of the Expert Advisory Group set up by the Australian Government to guide reforms to the Administrative Appeals Tribunal. He is a former Chief Justice of the Federal Court of Australia.

== Early life and education ==
Patrick Anthony Keane was born to Patrick and Margaret Keane (née Houseman) and raised in Wilston, a middle-class, inner-city suburb in northern Brisbane, Queensland. Patrick Keane senior was a Royal Australian Air Force aviator who died from a heart attack when the younger Patrick was seven.

Keane was educated at Catholic schools: St. Columba's Convent School and St. Joseph's College, Gregory Terrace in Brisbane, where he was the school captain and dux of 1969, winning an Open Scholarship in the Queensland Senior Public Examinations. After eliminating other vocations, he graduated from the University of Queensland with a Bachelor of Arts in 1973, and a Bachelor of Laws with first-class honours and a University Medal in 1976.

During his studies, Keane worked as a law clerk at Roberts & Kane Solicitors and was headhunted by Feez Ruthning (now Allens Linklaters) by one of the partners.

Keane read for a Bachelor of Civil Law at Magdalen College of the University of Oxford and was awarded the Vinerian Scholarship, a scholarship given to the student that "gives the best performance in the examination for the Degree of Bachelor of Civil Law". Having earned a B.C.L. with First-Class Honours in 1977, he then returned to Australia.

== Career ==
=== Pre-judicial career ===
Keane was admitted as a Solicitor and Barrister of the Supreme Court of Queensland in 1976 and went to the bar, as a Barrister of the Supreme Court of Queensland, in 1977. During 1978–1979, he was a part-time lecturer at the University of Queensland.

In 1988, after 11 years at the bar, Keane took silk.

In 1992, Keane was appointed Solicitor-General of Queensland, a position he held under Labor and Coalition state governments until his appointment to the Court of Appeal of the Supreme Court of Queensland.

Keane published a number of articles and has been outspoken on the quality of legislative drafting. During 1990–1992, he was the Deputy Chairman of the Queensland Law Reform Commission. In 2011, he condemned the "volume and complexity of federal laws", telling the Australian Financial Review that "opening the tax act is like entering the door to a parallel universe".

=== Judicial career ===
In 2005, Keane was appointed a Judge of Appeal of the Court of Appeal of the Supreme Court of Queensland, the highest court in that state.

On 10 February 2010, Commonwealth Attorney-General Robert McClelland announced that Keane would be appointed as the next Chief Justice of the Federal Court of Australia. Keane took up that role on 22 March 2010.

On 8 June 2015, he was named a Companion of the Order of Australia for eminent service to the law and to the judiciary, through contributions to improved legal and public administration, as an advocate for increased access to justice, to ethical standards, and to a range of professional organisations.

==== High Court career ====
On 20 November 2012, Attorney-General Nicola Roxon announced that Keane had been appointed a Justice of the High Court of Australia effective on the retirement of Dyson Heydon on 1 March 2013. Keane became the 50th Justice appointed to the High Court. Keane's position as Chief Justice on the Federal Court bench was filled by James Allsop, the president of the NSW Court of Appeal.

==== Court of Final Appeal (Hong Kong) ====
In 2023, Keane was nominated as a non-permanent judge at the age of 70. The appointment comes after two other foreign non-permanent judges resigned from the positions after citing issues with the government crackdown on freedoms in the region.

He remained in the position, along with other Australian judges William Gummow, and James Allsop, after British judge Jonathan Sumption resigned, criticising the judiciary of Hong Kong after 14 prominent democratic activists were convicted for subversion.

A speech given by Keane in Sydney's Banco Court on 22 October 2024 was picketed by a small group of demonstrators over his role in the Court of Final Appeal. The protesters held pictures showing Jimmy Lai. On 24 October, the Hong Kong government released a statement that described "any attempt by any organisation or individual to exert pressure on judges and judicial officers" as being "clearly a reprehensible act" that should be "vehemently condemned".

== Personal life ==
In 1974, aged 22, Keane married Shelley, with whom he has three sons and five grandchildren. Dr. Shelley Keane is a psychologist. His son Patrick was born in Oxford in December 1976. His second son David Daniel Keane is a King’s Counsel in Australia. His youngest son Michael lives in New Zealand.

The Australian reported that Keane is said to have been close to former Prime Minister and fellow Queenslander Kevin Rudd and that Keane has been described by one unnamed Brisbane barrister as a "Labor man". Keane's appointment met with bipartisan approval: the Liberal Party's justice spokesperson, Senator George Brandis, described Keane's appointment as "the right decision" and Keane himself as a "very, very distinguished lawyer, both academically and professionally" with "a very illustrious reputation".

Keane is a supporter of the Brisbane Broncos, the Brisbane Lions and the Carlton Blues AFL clubs and enjoys cricket, even having once considered playing the sport professionally.

Legal offices
Preceded by Michael Black	Chief Justice of the Federal Court of Australia; 2010–2013	Succeeded by James Allsop
Preceded by Dyson Heydon	Justice of the High Court of Australia; 2013–2022	Succeeded by Jayne Jagot
