= Debra Mullins =

Australian judge

The Honourable Justice Debra Mullins AO

President of the Queensland Court of Appeal
- Incumbent
- Assumed office 21 May 2022
- Preceded by: Walter Sofronoff

Judge of the Supreme Court of Queensland
- Incumbent
- Assumed office 16 March 2000

Acting Governor of Queensland
- In office 20 October 2024 – 22 October 2024

Personal details
- Born: Debra Ann Curtis; 12 February 1957 (age 69) Sydney
- Children: 3
- Education: LL.M. (1999)
- Alma mater: University of Queensland
- Occupation: Judge, barrister

Debra Mullins AO (born 12 February 1957) is the president of the Queensland Court of Appeal. She has served on the Supreme Court of Queensland since 2000, and was elevated to the Court of Appeal in 2020. She was appointed as senior counsel in and for the State of Queensland in 1998.

Mullins attended Coorparoo State High School (now Coorparoo Secondary College) for her secondary education. Mullins graduated from the University of Queensland with a BCom (1977), an LL.B. (1980) and a Master of Laws (1999).

In 2014, Mullins was appointed as the deputy chancellor of the Anglican Diocese of Brisbane, and was appointed as the chancellor of the diocese in 2014.

Mullins was appointed an Officer of the Order of Australia (AO) in the 2019 Queen's Birthday Honours for "distinguished service to the law, and to the judiciary, to professional development and legal education, and to women".

From 20 to 22 October 2024, Justice Mullins was Acting Governor of Queensland during the visit of King Charles III to Canberra and Sydney.
