= Pyne & Marles =

2016–2019 Australian TV political commentary series

- Title card
- Genre: Current affairs, political commentary
- Presented by: Christopher Pyne; Richard Marles
- Country of origin: Australia
- Original language: English
- No. of seasons: 5
- No. of episodes: 108

Production
- Running time: 30 minutes (inc. adverts)

Original release
- Network: Sky News Australia
- Release: 6 February 2016 – 29 March 2019

Pyne & Marles is an Australian television political commentary which was broadcast weekly on Sky News Live. The program was co-hosted by two serving frontbench MPs, Liberal minister Christopher Pyne and Labor shadow minister Richard Marles, without a journalist or moderator. It covered the political issues of the week.

The series premiered on 6 February 2016 on Sky News Live at 8:30am AEDT, replacing Saturday Agenda and continuing weekly. The program was broadcast live. The hosts were given editorial control over the program, and neither was paid by Sky News for presenting the format.

The program moved to Friday afternoons for its second season, in the timeslot To The Point held on other weekdays at the time. The program ended in its fifth season after 105 episodes, shortly after Pyne announced his retirement from politics at the 2019 Australian federal election.

== Episodes ==
Season	Episodes	Originally released	
Season	Episodes	First released	Last released
1	19	6 February 2016	25 June 2016
2	16	5 August 2016	25 November 2016
3	36	17 February 2017	8 December 2017
4	32	9 February 2018	7 December 2018
5	TBA	1 February 2019	TBA

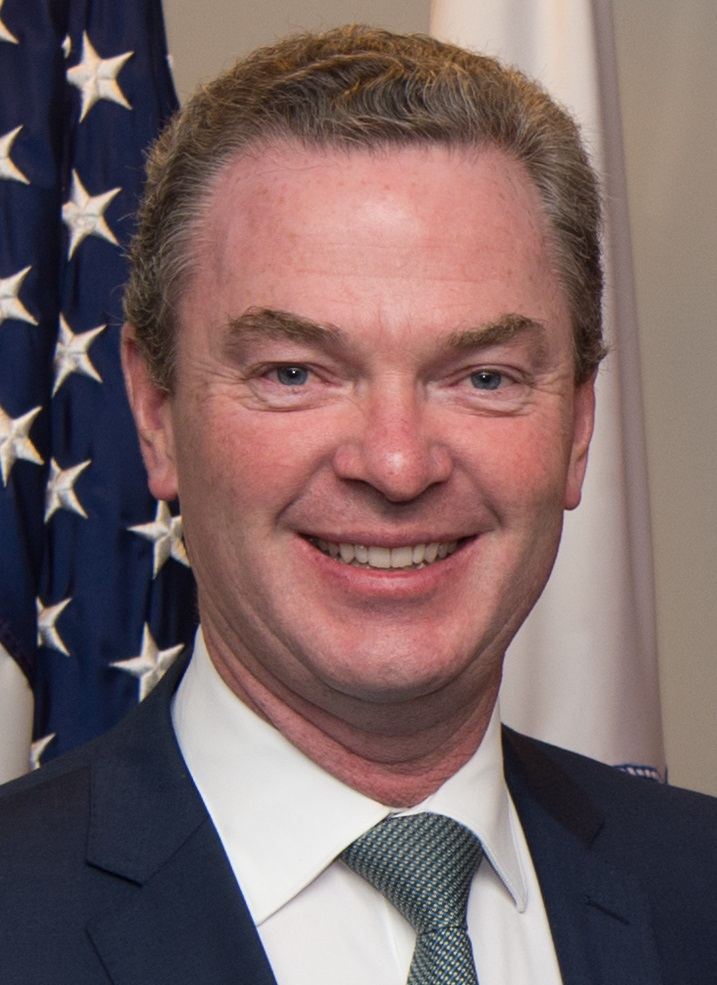
Christopher Pyne

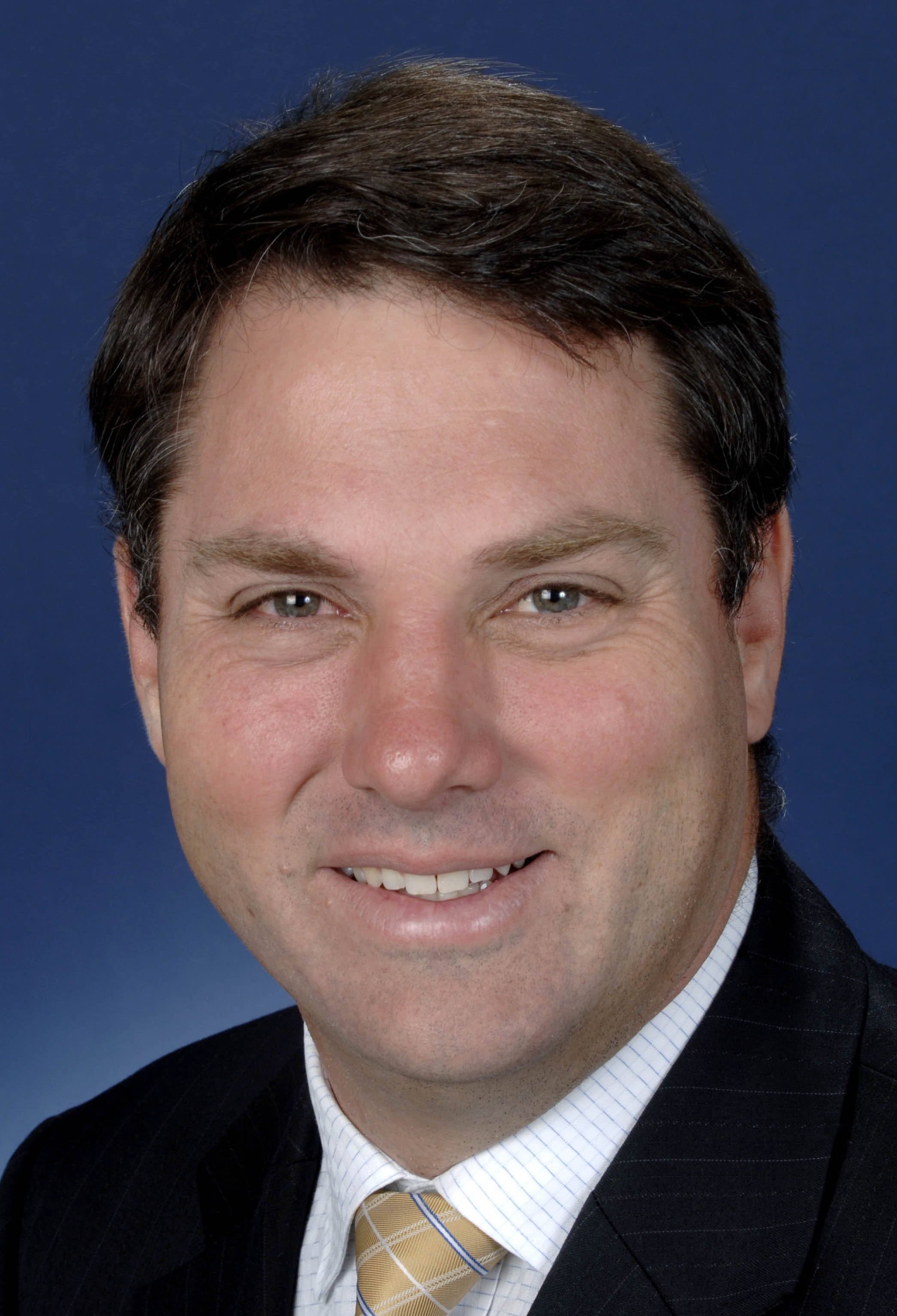
Richard Marles

Co-hosts of Pyne and Marles

=== Season 1 ===
No. overall	No. in season	Guest(s)	Original release date
1	1	Samantha Maiden	6 February 2016
2	2	Peter Jennings	13 February 2016
3	3	Harold Mitchell	20 February 2016
4	4	Kim Beazley	27 February 2016
5	5	Jonathan Swan	5 March 2016
6	6	Marguerite Evans-Galea	12 March 2016
7	7	Amanda Vanstone	19 March 2016
8	8	Latika Bourke	9 April 2016
9	9	Maile Carnegie	16 April 2016
10	10	James Massola	23 April 2016
11	11	Sue Cato	30 April 2016
12	12	Samantha Maiden	7 May 2016
13	13	John Tass Parker	14 May 2016
14	14	Ian Forsyth	21 May 2016
15	15	Chris Uhlmann	28 May 2016
16	16	Andrew Percy	4 June 2016
17	17	Gerard Whateley	11 June 2016
18	18	Matthew Knott	18 June 2016
19	19	Dennis Shanahan	25 June 2016

=== Season 2 ===
No. overall	No. in season	Guest(s)	Original release date
20	1	David Kalisch	5 August 2016
21	2	Jonathan Swan	12 August 2016
22	3	Samantha Maiden	19 August 2016
23	4	Gerard Whateley	26 August 2016
24	5	David Speers	2 September 2016
25	6	Tanya Hosch	9 September 2016
26	7	Laura Jayes	16 September 2016
27	8	Andrew Meares	23 September 2016
28	9	Greg Sheridan	30 September 2016
29	10	Bruce Wolpe	14 October 2016
30	11	Samantha Maiden	21 October 2016
31	12	David Speers, Dan Bourchier	28 October 2016
32	13	David Speers	4 November 2016
33	14	Peter Jennings	11 November 2016
34	15	Adam Gartrell	18 November 2016
35	16	Tom Connell	25 November 2016

=== Season 3 ===
No. overall	No. in season	Guest(s)	Original release date
36	1	John Berry	17 February 2017
37	2	Peter Jennings	24 February 2017
38	3	Natasha Stott Despoja	10 March 2017
39	4	Samantha Maiden	17 March 2017
40	5	Hugh White	24 March 2017
41	6	Peta Credlin (as co-host replacing Pyne), Peter Jennings	7 April 2017
42	7	John Bale	28 April 2017
43	8	Brendan Thomas-Noone	5 May 2017
44	9	Dennis Richardson	12 May 2017
45	10	Peter Beattie (as co-host replacing Marles), James Curran	19 May 2017
46	11	Menna Rawlings	26 May 2017
47	12	Peter Jennings	2 June 2017
48	13	Herve Lemahieu	9 June 2017
49	14	Annika Smethurst	16 June 2017
50	15	Prince Ermias Sahle Selassie	23 June 2017
51	16	Liz Allen	30 June 2017
52	17	Euan Graham	7 July 2017
53	18	Peter Leahy	21 July 2017
54	19	David Speers	28 July 2017
55	20	Michael Steele	4 August 2017
56	21	Joseph Siracusa	11 August 2017
57	22	Samantha Maiden (as co-host replacing Marles), David Speers	25 August 2017
58	23	John Bates	1 September 2017
59	24	Greg Fealy	8 September 2017
60	25	Samantha Maiden (as co-host replacing Pyne), Merav Michaeli	15 September 2017
61	26	Travis Auld	22 September 2017
62	27	Tom Connell (as co-host replacing Marles), Andrew Fagan	29 September 2017
63	28	Tim Barrett	6 October 2017
64	29	Tom Connell (as co-host replacing Marles), Jason Trethowan	13 October 2017
65	30	Georgina Downer	20 October 2017
66	31	Andrew Davies	27 October 2017
67	32	Harriett Baldwin	10 November 2017
68	33	Liz Allen	17 November 2017
69	34	Malcolm Parker	24 November 2017
70	35	Peter FitzSimons	1 December 2017
71	36	Magda Szubanski	8 December 2017

=== Season 4 ===
No. overall	No. in season	Guest(s)	Original release date
72	1	Marcus Wallenberg	9 February 2018
73	2	Michael McLeod	16 February 2018
74	3	Jim Callinan	23 February 2018
75	4	Michelle Simmons	2 March 2018
76	5	Alan Oxley	9 March 2018
77	6	Aaron Connelly	16 March 2018
78	7	Dave Sharma	23 March 2018
79	8	Peter Beattie	6 April 2018
80	9	Fergus Hanson	20 April 2018
81	10	John Bale	27 April 2018
82	11	Kim Rubenstein	11 May 2018
83	12	Greg Sheridan	18 May 2018
84	13	David Speers	25 May 2018
85	14	Greg Barton	1 June 2018
86	15	Sam Roggeveen	15 June 2018
87	16	Kate Jenkins	22 June 2018
88	17	Kate Louis	29 June 2018
89	18	Peter Jennings	20 July 2018
90	19	Simon Jackman	27 July 2018
91	20	Kate Palmer	3 August 2018
92	21	Dr. Paul Jones	10 August 2018
93	22	Josh Frydenberg, Ed Husic	17 August 2018
94	23	Peter Jennings	7 September 2018
95	24	James Carouso	14 September 2018
96	25	Everald Compton	21 September 2018
97	26	Bernard Salt	12 October 2018
98	27	Jim Callinan	2 November 2018
99	28	Bruce Wolpe	9 November 2018
100	29	James Batley	16 November 2018
101	30	James Campbell	23 November 2018
102	31	Sir Roger Carr	30 November 2018
103	32	Mike Burgess	7 December 2018

=== Season 5 ===
No. overall	No. in season	Guest(s)	Original release date
104	1	Julie Inman Grant	1 February 2019
105	2	Margo Andrae	15 February 2019
106	3	no guest	22 February 2019
107	4	Wing Commander Darren Clare	1 March 2019
108	5	Nick Warner	29 March 2019

== Reception ==
The program has been lampooned for the "awkward" presenting style of the presenters.
