= 2021 March 4 Justice =

Nationwide protests in Australia on 15 March 2021

The 2021 March 4 Justice (also styled Women's March 4 Justice) took place on 15 March 2021 across Australia. The protest included a series of events in major Australian cities including the nation's capital Canberra. Protests occurred in 55 towns and cities across Australia; organisers estimated 150,000 people were in attendance. The Women’s March 4 Justice was the largest women’s march ever held in Australia. Parliamentary business was shut down in both the Federal and State Parliaments, allowing politicians to attend the marches. The Federal Opposition Leader, Anthony Albanese, and his entire cabinet joined the protesters in the Canberra march, along with many Independent and Greens candidates. The Prime Minister, Scott Morrison did not attend the marches despite being formally asked to by the organisers

== Background ==
In the months prior to the Women’s March 4 Justice, Australia was witnessing a decline in gender equality. On the Global Gender Equality Index, Australia had dropped to 44th place. Violence against women was continuing to increase It was against this background and the perceived lack of response by the Australian federal government to the reporting that a political staffer, Brittany Higgins, was allegedly raped in Australia's parliament house in Canberra, and that historical allegations of rape were made against the country's Attorney General, Christian Porter during his youth.

The protest organisers also stated that an important factor inspiring the event was the public disclosures and testimonies of harassment and assault from former schoolgirls that were collected by activist Chanel Contos, who had been campaigning for schools to improve their instruction concerning sexual consent.

Janine Hendry, the founder of the protests, stated that "violence against women was rising and gender equality was declining and yet our political leaders were blind to the broader implications of their actions."

== Protests ==
The March 4 Justice was founded by Janine Hendry, an academic and social entrepreneur based in Melbourne.

Hendry put out a tweet on February 25, 2021, asking for people to meet her in Canberra, to form a ring around Parliament House, in silent protest against the behaviour of the Australian government and their lack of action on violence against women. There was a huge response to Hendry’s tweet and she went on to put together a team of volunteers who collaborated to organise over 55 marches across the country, within a 13-day period.

The day before the marches, Hendry was invited to meet with the Prime Minister, Scott Morrison, for a private meeting to discuss the women’s issues. Hendry refused to meet with the Prime Minister, stating that she would not meet him behind closed doors, instead the Prime Minister was invited to join the protesters on the forecourt of Parliament House. The Prime Minister refused the invitation.

On the morning of the march in Canberra, Hendry bumped into the Deputy Prime Minister, Michael McCormick, in the Press Gallery, an exchange followed, where Hendry pressed McCormick on why the Government had sat on the findings of the Jenkins Respect @ Work report, a major report into workplace safety. The report and its recommendations had sat on the Attorney General’s desk for over 18 months. McCormick refused to give Hendry any assurances that the Government would review the findings of the report.

== Demands ==
The protest organisers listed four objectives for the protest events, described in their petition to the Australian government:

1. Full independent investigations into all cases of gendered violence and timely referrals to appropriate authorities. Full public accountability for findings.
2. Fully implement the 55 recommendations in the Australian Human Rights Commission’s Respect@Work report of the National Inquiry into Sexual Harassment in Australian Workplaces 2020.
3. Lift public funding for gendered violence prevention to world’s best practice.
4. The enactment of a federal Gender Equality Act to promote gender equality. It should include a gender equity audit of Parliamentary practices.

- Women's March 4 Justice

Protests took place in over 55 cities in Australia including all state and territory capitals.

== Government response ==
Following the Canberra march the Australian Prime Minister, Scott Morrison described the protests in a favourable light; emphasising the democratic nature of Australia that allows such protests to take place without persecution: Morrison referenced unnamed countries in the region that would have met protesters with violence, saying that "elsewhere, protesters are being met with bullets". These comments were received negatively by members of the Opposition and by the women of Australia.

== Broader implications of the March 4 Justice ==
The March 4 Justice received worldwide attention. In particular, the Morrison Government’s response to the alleged sexual assault allegation that had occurred inside Parliament House

It was a widely held belief that the marches had a significant impact on the Morisson Government and largely contributed to the Government's failure to get elected in the 2022 Federal Election because they were largely seen as ignoring the needs of Australian women.

The Labor Government, elected in 2022, implemented the recommendations of the Jenkins Respect@Work Report, whilst increasing funding into the prevention of gendered violence. The 2022 election saw a Parliamentary Cabinet sworn in that was for the first time in history, gender balanced. The 2022 election also saw a rise in largely female Independents being elected into seats that had been considered safe Liberal Party seats. The Independents (collectively referred to as Teals) based their campaigns on Equality, Environment and Integrity.

== See also ==
- Feminism in Australia
- Me Too movement
