= Body memory hypothesis =

Hypothesis on instinctive reactions by the body

Body memory (BM) is a hypothesis that the body itself is capable of storing memories, as opposed to only the brain. While experiments have demonstrated the possibility of cellular memory, there are currently no known means by which tissues other than the brain would be capable of storing memories.

Modern usage of BM tends to frame it exclusively in the context of traumatic memory and ways in which the body responds to recall of a memory. In this regard, it has become relevant in treatment for PTSD.

== Overview ==
Peter Levine calls BM implicit memory or more specifically procedural memory, things that the body is capable of doing automatically and not in one's consciousness. He clarifies 3 types of BM and frames his work in terms of traumatic memory consequence and resolution:

1. Learned motor actions - Action patterns that can be continuously modified over time by higher brain regions.
2. Emergency response - Hardwired instinctual behaviors (i.e., fight or flight response, etc...).
3. Attraction or repulsion - We are attracted to sources of nourishment and growth and repulsed from sources of injury or toxicity.

Nicola Diamond elaborates on the opinion of philosopher Merleau-Ponty and asserts that BM is formed by doing. Whether practicing a bodily activity or forming a reaction to a traumatic memory.

Edward Casey speaks of BM as, "memory intrinsic to the body, how we remember by and through the body", rather than what is remembered about the body.

Thomas Fuchs defines 6 different types of BM: procedural, situational, intercorporeal, incorporative, pain, and traumatic memory. He notes that they are not strictly separable from one another but "derived from different dimensions of bodily experience. Michelle Summa further refines this definition as an implicit memory. A pre-thematic, operative consciousness of the past expressed through the body.

Antonio Damasio calls these reactions to memories somatic markers or emotions that are expressed primarily as physical feelings.

These memories are often associated with phantom pain in a part or parts of the body – the body appearing to remember the past trauma. The idea of body memory is a belief frequently associated with the idea of repressed memories, in which memories of incest or sexual abuse can be retained and recovered through physical sensations. It may also be associated with phantom limb sensation but this is less common.

=== Skepticism ===
In 1993, Susan E. Smith, presented a paper relating the idea of "Survivor Psychology" at a false memory syndrome conference, stated about BM that, "body memories are thought to literally be emotional, kinesthetic, or chemical recordings stored at the cellular level and retrievable by returning to or recreating the chemical, emotional, or kinesthetic conditions under which the memory recordings are filed. She went on in the abstract of the paper, "one of the most commonly used theories to support the ideology of repressed memories or incest and sexual abuse amnesia is body memories." and "The belief in these pseudoscientific concepts appears to be related to scientific illiteracy, gullibility, and a lack of critical thinking skills and reasoning abilities in both the mental health community and in society at large"

A 2017 systematic review of cross-disciplinary research in body memory found that the available data neither largely support or refute the claim that memories are stored outside of the brain and more research is needed.

In the Encyclopedia of Phenomenology Embree notes that, "To posit body memory is to open up a Pandora's Box", and links the idea to physical associations of memory rather than as a memory stored in a bodily manner.

== Cellular memory ==
Cellular memory (CM) is a parallel hypothesis to BM positing that memories can be stored outside the brain in all cells. The idea that non-brain tissues can have memories is believed by some who have received organ transplants, though this is considered impossible. The author said the stories are intriguing though and may lead to some serious scientific investigation in the future. In his book TransplantNation Douglas Vincent suggests that atypical newfound memories, thoughts, emotions and preferences after an organ transplant are more suggestive of immunosuppressant drugs and the stress of surgery on perception than of legitimate memory transference. In other words, "as imaginary as a bad trip on LSD or other psychotropic drug."

=== Flatworms ===
Biologists at Tufts University have been able to train flatworms despite the loss of the brain and head. This may show memory stored in other parts of the body in some animals. A worm reduced to 1/279th of the original can be regrown within a few weeks and be trained much quicker to head towards light and open space for food, an unnatural behavior for a flatworm. With each head removed training times appear reduced. This may just be a sign of epigenetics showing the appearance of memory.

However, in the 1950s and 1960s James McConnell flatworm experiments measured how long it took to learn a maze. McConnell trained some to move around a maze and then chopped them up and fed them to untrained worms. The untrained group learned faster compared to a control that had not been fed trained worms. McConnell believed the experiment indicated cellular memory. The training involved stressing the worms with electric shock. This kind of stress releases persistent hormones and shows no evidence for memory transfer. Similar experiments with mice being trained and being fed to untrained mice showed improved learning. It was not a memory that was transferred but hormone enriched tissue.

=== Current usage and research ===
In epigenetics there are various mechanisms for cells to pass on "memories" of stressors to their progeny. Strategies include Msn2 nucleo-cytoplasmic shuttling, changes in chromatin, partitioning of anti-stress factors, and damaged macromolecules between mother and daughter cells.

In adaptive immunity there is a functional CM that enables the immune system to learn to react to pathogens through mechanisms such as cytotoxic memory mediation in bone marrow, innate immune memory in stromal cells, fungal mediation of innate and inherited immunological response, and T- and B-cell immune training. In this regard CM is essential for vaccine and immunity research.
