= LetHerSpeak =

Australian sex crime victim movement

#LetHerSpeak (also known as #LetUsSpeak) is an Australian campaign to amend evidence legislation so as to allow victims of sex crimes to be publicly identified if they choose. The campaign was founded in November 2018 by journalist Nina Funnell with support from End Rape on Campus (EROC), News Corp Australia and Sydney law firm Marque. It focuses on changes to the law in Tasmania, Victoria and the Northern Territory. As of 2021, the parliaments of Tasmania and the Northern Territory had amended their laws accordingly.

== Laws relating to victims of sex offences ==
All Australian jurisdictions provide some form of legal protection to prevent victims of sexual offences from being publicly identified. However, as of 2018, laws in Tasmania, Victoria and the Northern Territory were framed in such a way as to make it impossible for victims to identify themselves in the media without a court order. The campaign characterised these provisions as "gag laws".

== Catalyst for #LetHerSpeak ==
Between June and December 2010, Hobart schoolteacher Nicolaas Bester repeatedly sexually abused a 15-year-old student named Grace Tame. Following his release from prison, Bester posted a comment on social media website Facebook bragging about his offending. In 2017, social commentator Bettina Arndt interviewed Bester for her YouTube channel about attempts to bar him from postgraduate study at the University of Tasmania. Tame condemned the interview as giving "a platform to a paedophile". Because of the wording of the Evidence Act, media outlets were forced to quote Tame as "Jane Doe".

Journalists, commentators, and even my perpetrator have all been able to publicly discuss my case. I’m the only one who is not allowed to. It’s not just illogical, it’s cruel.

— Grace Tame,

Wanting to speak publicly, Tame enlisted the help of the End Rape on Campus (EROC) campaign, journalist Funnell and the publisher of the city's main newspaper, The Mercury. She sought a court order under s. 194K allowing her name to be published. Only two victims had previously won such orders in Tasmania, among them Beyond Abuse Chief Executive Steve Fisher.

Although ultimately successful, the process was difficult, all the more so since by then Tame was living in the United States. The complexity of the process, Funnell later wrote, "exacerbated pre-existing feelings of powerlessness and injustice". Tame observed that “Journalists, commentators, and even my perpetrator have all been able to publicly discuss my case. I’m the only one who is not allowed to. It’s not just illogical, it’s cruel.”

The Supreme Court of Tasmania granted Tame's application in August 2019 after two years and $10,000 in legal costs. She appeared on the front page of the Hobart Mercury on 12 August above the headline "My name is Grace Tame and I am Jane Doe".

== #LetHerSpeak campaign ==
Similar legal provisions were on the statute-books in Victoria and the Northern Territory. Across the three jurisdictions, Funnell was able to make contact with more than a dozen men and women, victims of abuse who wanted to tell their stories but were forced by existing laws to remain anonymous. The journalist worked with EROC Australia, News Corp and Sydney law firm Marque to establish a law-reform campaign known as #LetHerSpeak. #LetHerSpeak launched in November 2018 and attracted support from celebrities worldwide including Alyssa Milano, Tara Moss and John Cleese, as well as leaders of the MeToo movement. Tame's story, along with those of Victorian woman Jaime-Lee Page and others, featured prominently in the campaign.

#LetHerSpeak ultimately provided legal support to 13 women and 4 men in gaining similar court orders, and led to amendments to the law in Tasmania and the Northern Territory.

== Awards and recognition ==
Funnell and #LetHerSpeak have won a number of awards and accolades, including:

- Walkley Award for Public Service Journalism (2020)
- Walkley Our Watch Award (2020)
- Media, Entertainment and Arts Alliance Northern Territory Media Award Best Online Coverage (2020)
- Kennedy Award for Best Online Video (2020)
- B&T Women in Media Awards – Woman of the Year (2021) and Producer/Journalist of the Year
- News Corp Australia Campaign of the Year (2019)

Tame was nominated for Tasmanian Australian of the Year in 2020 on the basis of her role "championing" the #LetHerSpeak campaign and was Australian of the Year 2021.

== See also ==
- LetUsTalk
