= Shane Drumgold =

Australian lawyer

Shane Drumgold SC
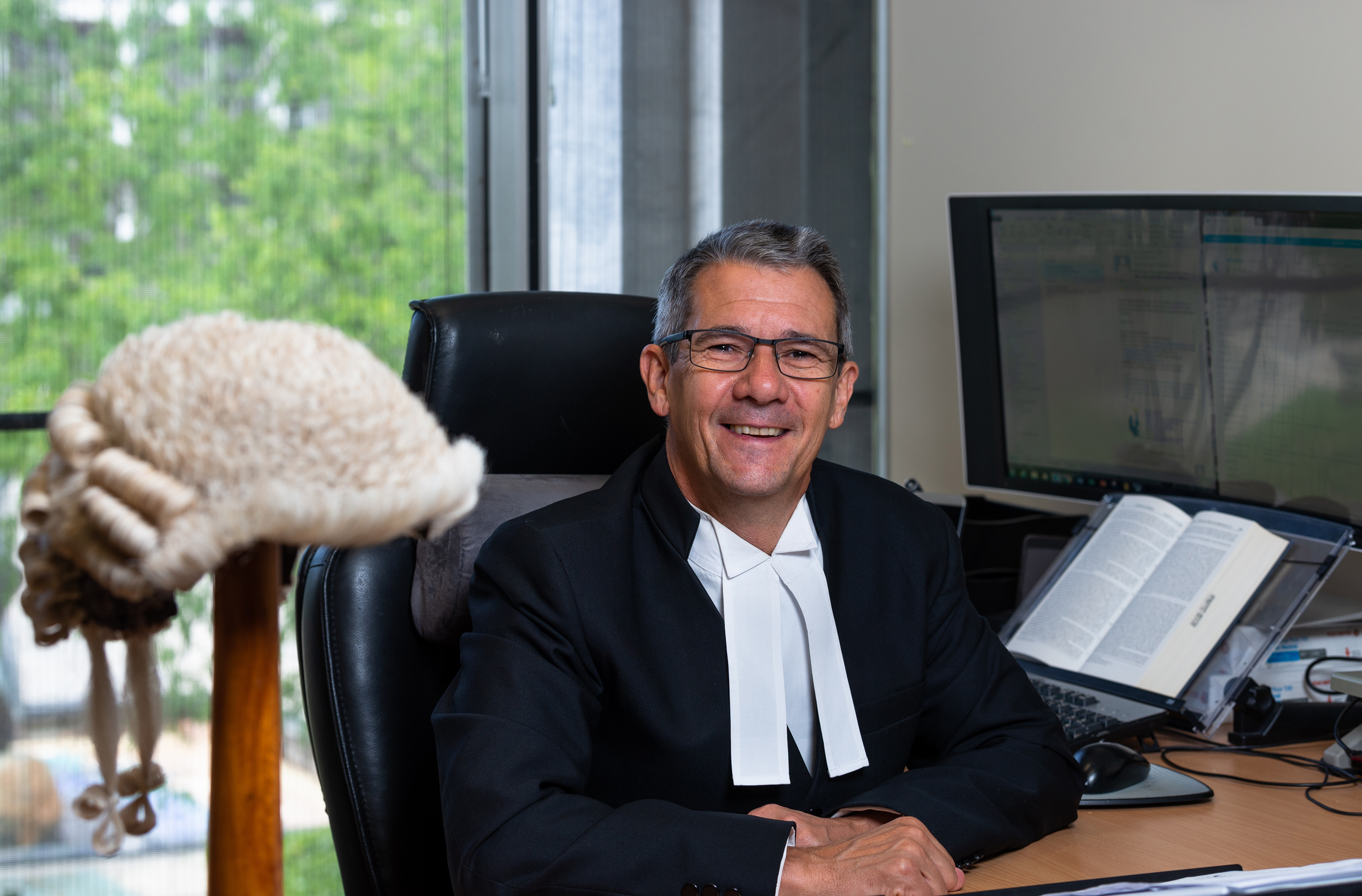
- Born: Neville Shane Drumgold
- Occupations: Lawyer, Barrister
- Years active: 2002 - Current
- Title: Former ACT Director of Public Prosecutions

Academic background
- Education: BEc (CSU) LLB (Hons) (UC) LLM International Law (ANU)
- Alma mater: Charles Sturt University University of Canberra Australian National University
- Website: https://find-a-barrister.nswbar.asn.au/profile/b18242

Shane Drumgold SC (born 1965) is an Australian Barrister, Associate Professor of law, and was the Australian Capital Territory's fifth Director of Public Prosecutions. He was appointed to this role on 1 January 2019 by the Attorney General Gordon Ramsay, succeeding Jon White SC, and resigned from the role on 6 August 2023, and is currently a Senior Counsel at Frederick Jordan Chambers in Sydney Australia.

== Early life and education ==
Shane Drumgold was born Neville Shane Drumgold in Sydney, New South Wales. Drumgold grew up in the public housing estate of Mount Druitt in Sydney’s outer western suburbs. He attended Lethbridge Park Public School, then Shalvey Public High School. In 1978 his family relocated to Taree, New South Wales. Here he attended Taree High School and then Chatham High School. Drumgold’s father Neville Drumgold suffered severe mental illness and committed suicide in 1987. This had a significant impact on Drumgold’s life. He has referenced the suicide of his father and the death of his younger brother, at three years of age, in his book Palm Tree Justice. He has also spoken about both events in media interviews and public speeches.

Drumgold commenced work for Australia Post in 1984; in 1993 he completed an Australia Post sponsored Certificate in Business Management through Charles Sturt University. In 1995 he was admitted to the Bachelor of Business Economics degree at Charles Sturt University and graduated in 1999.

In 1999, Drumgold applied to the Australian National University and the University of Canberra for admission to the Bachelor of Laws degree. He was rejected by both. Drumgold then enrolled in the Diploma of Justice Studies at the University of Canberra. After successful completion of the first semester he was admitted to the Bachelor of Laws degree at the same University in 2000. He graduated with honours in 2001. In his occasional address to a 2021 graduation class, he noted that following his graduation he was employed as both a prosecutor at the ODPP and tutor at the Australian National University:

I cannot explain the surreal experience of standing before a class of University students, teaching them criminal and evidence law, in a degree program they were accepted into the same year I was rejected. This is one of many experiences that has instilled in me the value of keeping one’s eye on the target, regardless of the external narrative. Do not outsource your sense of agency to others, because they do not know your potential like you do and have no interest in re-writing your future.

In 2001 Drumgold was accepted into the Master’s in International Law Degree at the Australian National University. He graduated in 2004.

In 2003 Drumgold was awarded a Churchill Fellowship, studying restorative justice in indigenous communities in the USA, Canada and New Zealand. He published his report in 2004.

In 2024 Drumgold commenced a PhD, studying accountability structures for Commissions of Inquiry.

== Career ==
Drumgold left school in 1980 at the age of fifteen, starting as a telegram boy for Australia Post in April 1984 in Penrith, New South Wales. He then worked as a postman in Gloucester, New South Wales from September 1986. He was promoted from postman to postal clerk and then to senior postal clerk. In September 1994 he was promoted to postal manager at the Canberra Parliament House post office, then the Canberra Civic post office. In September 1999 he resigned from Australia Post to pursue full time legal studies.

Between December 1999 and January 2001 Drumgold worked as a part time legal officer at the South Eastern Aboriginal Legal Services in Canberra, and in 2001 he published a study on indigenous custody rates. In April 2002, Drumgold commenced working as a Prosecutor at the Australia Capital Territory Office of the Director of Public Prosecution. He worked part time as a tutor at the Australian National University. He continued this role until his appointment as Director of Public Prosecutions in January 2019.

In 2006 to 2007 Drumgold took leave from the Office of the Director of Public Prosecutions to work as a Public Defender in the Solomon Islands. This was part of the Regional Assistance Mission to the Solomon Islands during which time he defended murder trials:

- Regina v Tonawane, Saeeni and Ors [2006] HCSI-CRC 231 of 2004.
- Regina v Moru [2006] HCSI-CRC 574 of 2005.
- Regina v Yamalo [2006] SCHC 169 of 2005.

He defended matters arguing for a stay or prosecution based on a post-civil war amnesty Regina v Su’u & Ors [2007] HCSI-CRC 333 of 2006. He was lead counsel in a case seeking a High Court declaration of unlawful conduct by the then Australian dominated Solomon Islands Corrective Services in Ross & Ors v Attorney General [2006] SBHC 573 of 2005. Drumgold later published a book discussing many of these cases.

Drumgold worked as a prosecutor in the Australian Capital Territory for twenty-one years, between 2002-2023. During this time he prosecuted many of the Territories most serious murders, attempted murders, and conspiracies to murder:

- R v Iacuone SCC 295 of 2009
- R v JR SCC 369 of 2009
- R v Duffy SCC 268 of 2009
- R v Ashcroft SCC 405 of 2010
- R v Elphick SCC 108 of 2011
- R v Sewell SCC 28 of 2011
- R v Yuen SCC 109 of 2011
- R v Costa SCC 240 of 2012
- R v Vojneski SCC 27 of 2013
- R v Al Harazi SCC 207 of 2015
- R v Lee SCC 226 of 2015
- R v Woutersz SCC 73 of 2015
- R v Urlich SCC 204 of 2016
- R v Ophel SCC 344 of 2017
- R v Rappel SCC 204 of 2016

The matter of R v Rappel later became the subject of the 2020 book, The First Time He Hit Her. In 2019 Drumgold was appointed Senior Counsel and was selected by the Australian Bar Association to deliver the Silks address at the High Court of Australia Gala Silks Dinner in February 2020. An article in the New South Wales Bar Association Bar News later noted “[Drumgold] delivered a speech so inspiring and eloquent, that it drew a standing ovation. Among other things, Shane spoke of our responsibilities as role models and our obligation to build a profession that not only embraces but celebrates diversity in all of its forms.”

On 1 January 2019, Drumgold was appointed the Australian Capital Territory's fifth Director of Public Prosecutions. Drumgold was criticised for his decision not to proceed with charges against a man who helped his wife commit suicide on public interest grounds in the matter of Police v O'Riordan.

Shane Drumgold retired as ACT Director of Public Prosecutions in August 2023 accepting that his position had become 'untenable' after a 600-page report of inquiry into the prosecution in the Brittany Higgins rape allegation case found 'several serious findings of misconduct' against him. The findings included that Mr Drumgold deliberately misled the court, and misused legal professional privilege to avoid disclosing exculpatory evidence to the defence, all findings that Drumgold has strongly disputed. Section 14B of the Inquiries Act allowed the ACT Government up to one month to consider the response and consult those mentioned in the report, however it was reported on widely by The Australian newspaper after Walter Sofronoff admitted that he provided an advance copy to The Australian newspaper, who published widely on the findings. The ACT Government advised it was investigating whether this advance disclosure could be found to be illegal.

Drumgold challenged the Sofronoff report in a judicial review before the ACT Supreme Court. Following a three day hearing, Kaye AJ of the ACT Supreme Court declared that all adverse findings against Drumgold gave rise to an apprehension that they might have been influenced by the views held and publicly expressed by Ms Albrechtsen from The Australian, and further declared that one finding that a cross-examination of Senator Linda Reynolds was grossly unethical was also legally unreasonable, and that a further finding that Drumgold made a false statement to the Chief Police Officer also failed to observe natural justice. Kaye AJ further ordered that the ACT Government pay Drumgold's costs including any reserved costs save for any costs incurred in respect of the abandoned ground 1.

Evidence was provided that Sofronoff engaged in 91 telephone calls with journalists, 51 of which were with Ms Janet Albrechtsen, and 22 of which were with Mr Hedley Thomas from the Australian. The 91 telephone calls were for a total of 13 hours and 37 minutes. The telephone calls with Ms Albrechtsen were for 6 hours and 19 minutes, and with Mr Thomas for 5 hours and 8 minutes. By contrast the telephone calls with all other journalists during that period occupied a total of 2 hours and 10 minutes. It was further revealed that Albrechtsen flew to Brisbane for a private lunch with Sofronoff. It was reported that this was in stark contrast to Sofronoff's dealings with other media. In September 2024, the ACT Supreme Court released 1700 pages of communications revealing complaints from other journalist including The Australian reporting things that did not happen in the trial. It also revealed that Sofronoff personally provided documents to Albrechtsen that he had marked "strictly confidential".

An investigation by the ACT Bar Association subsequently found that the evidence relied upon by Sofronoff in making his findings did not amount to either unsatisfactory professional conduct or professional misconduct. It was reported on 6 November 2024 that The NSW Bar Association had also found no misconduct, and that Drumgold was a fit and proper person to practise law and had issued him a barristers practising certificate. It was also reported that Drumgold had commenced a PhD on accountability structures for commissioned inquiries, in the hope of preventing what went wrong in the Sofronoff Inquiry from happening again. On 16 October 2024, the Chief Minister of the ACT Andrew Barr publicly stated that it was a mistake to appoint Mr Sofronoff to the Board of Inquiry.

Drumgold is currently Senior Counsel at Frederick Jordan Chambers in Sydney NSW Australia.

On 5 April 2024, the ACT Integrity Commission published a media release, announcing that it was looking into the conduct of Sofronoff. On 13 May 2024, Integrity Commissioner Michael Adams KC released a statement stating that after a preliminary examination, he suspected on reasonable grounds, that Sofronoff's conduct may constitute corrupt conduct and he had launched an investigation. On 19 March 2025, the ACT Integrity Commission released its report, finding that Sofronoff had engaged in serious corrupt conduct during the public inquiry. The report found that the ACT Supreme Court findings rendered the Sofronoff findings legally invalid for jurisdictional error, however due to the deliberate actions of Sofronoff, Drumgold was denied the opportunity to block the release of the report, a consequence the Integrity Commission found was both predictable and irreparable.

Walter Sofronoff KC appealed the ACT Integrity Commission findings that he engaged in serious corrupt conduct to the Federal Court. On 11 December 2025, the Federal Court dismissed all 12 grounds of appeal, and confirmed the finding that Sofronoff engaged in serious corrupt conduct.

On 25 February 2026, the Australian Press Council found that multiple articles that The Australian newspaper had written about Drumgold breached numerous publication General Principles, including that they failed to take reasonable steps to ensure they were accurate and not misleading, and further they failed to ensure that the articles were not based on significantly inaccurate factual material or omission of key facts. It was further reported that as required, The Australian printed the Australian Press Council adjudication, but simultaneously printed a further "4000 word tantrum" directed at both Drumgold and the Australian Press Council.

The Australian newspaper’s treatment of Drumgold featured in the 2026 book “Getting Murdoched” by authors Andrew Dodd and Matthew Ricketson. In an interview with Drumgold on the release of the book, Drumgold said at times he feared for his safety, and said he felt abandoned by the ACT Government who knew the Sofronoff report was compromised yet still acted on it to force his resignation.

== Personal life ==
In 1983, at eighteen years of age, Drumgold married his first wife, who was 16-year-old and they subsequently had two children. Drumgold divorced in 1996. In 2003 Drumgold married again and is the father two children.

Drumgold was involved in the sport of boxing; winning a national gold medal at the Australian Masters Games in Adelaide, South Australia in the light welterweight division in 2011 and in 2013 in Geelong, Victoria in the welterweight division. He is a former director of referees and judges for boxing, Australia Capital Territory and has officiated at national boxing competitions. He retired from the sport after the 2015 National Championships in the Gold Coast, Queensland Australia.
