= Clarence District Cricket Club =

Australian cricket club

- Founded: 1956
- Home ground: Kangaroo Bay
- Colours: Maroon/White
- President: Paul Gregg
- Head coach: Shane Holland
- Captain: Justin Galeotti
- TCA/CTPL First Grade Titles: 14
- 2025/26: 1st of 9

Clarence District Cricket Club (CDCC) is a Grade level cricket club representing the city of Clarence in Tasmania's Grade Cricket Competition.

CDCC recently won their fourteenth 1st grade title in the 2025/26 season beating out New Town Cricket Club at Bellerive Oval

CDCC are based at, and play their home games at Kangaroo Bay Sports ground. Clarence District Cricket Club have strong affiliations with the Clarence Roos football club.

CDCC celebrated their 50th anniversary in 2006. CDCC were at their most dominant in the 1980s, when the team won 8 of their 14 titles including two "4-in-a-row's".

Clarence have been TCA/CTPL Premiers 14 times despite only joining the competition in 1956 and not winning their first title for 26 years, making them currently sixth on the overall winners list.

Currently the club field teams in the first, second and third grades of the TCA, now known as the CTPL or Cricket Tasmania Premier League competition, as well as an CTPL Under 18s team. There are also a large number of junior teams.

== Honours ==
TCA/CTPL Premierships: (14) 1981–82, 1982–83, 1983–84, 1984–85, 1987–88, 1988–89, 1989–90, 1990–91, 1994–95, 2002–2003, 2003–2004, 2011–12, 2017–18, 2025-26
