= Bettina Arndt =

Australian writer and commentator

Bettina Arndt AM
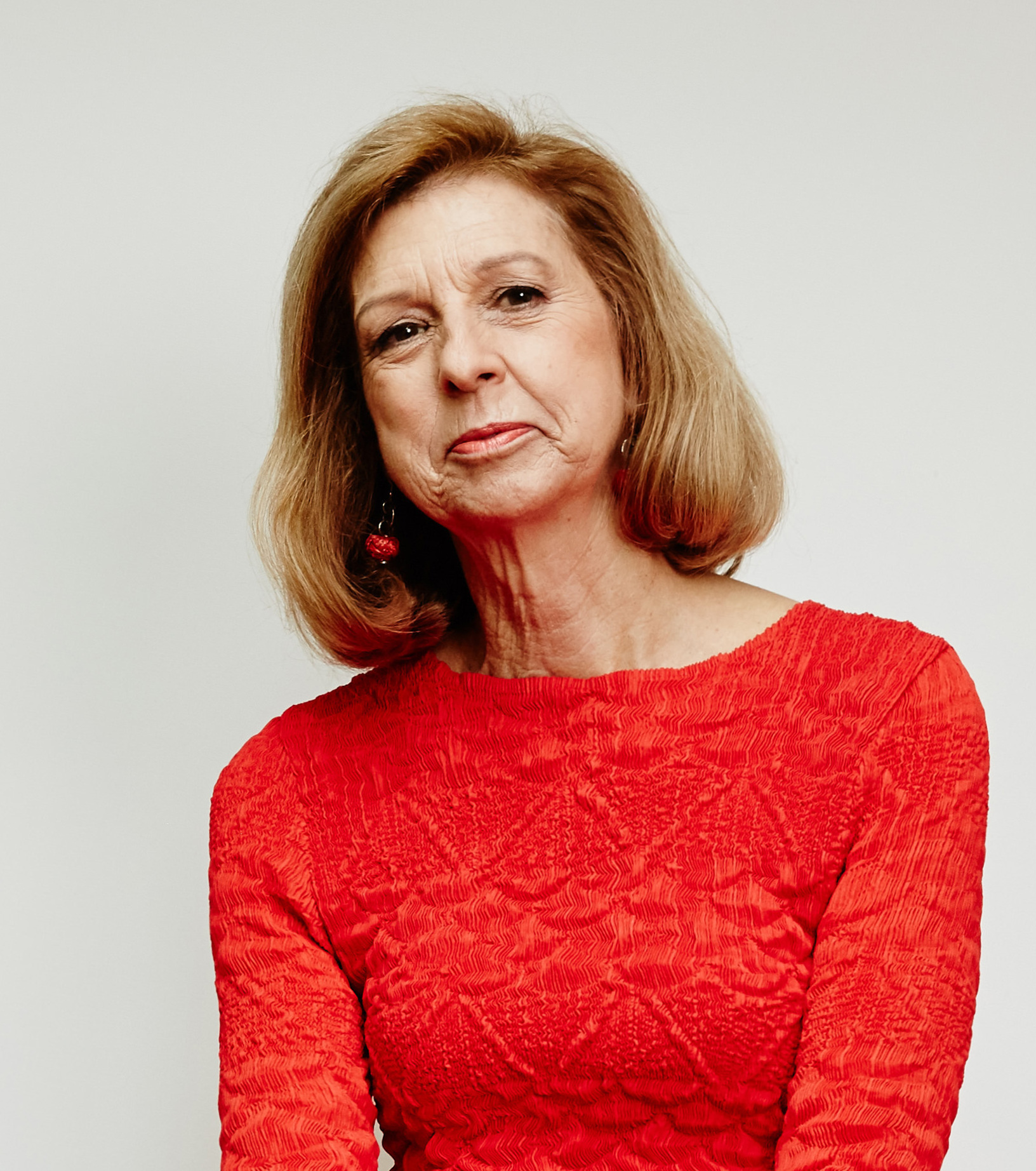
- Bettina Arndt in 2018
- Born: Bettina Mary Arndt; 1 August 1949 (age 77); Penrith, Cumbria, England
- Education: Australian National University; University of New South Wales
- Occupations: Writer, commentator, sex therapist
- Spouses: Dennis Minogue (m. 1977; died 1981) Warren Scott (m. 1986; div. 2007)
- Children: Three
- Parent(s): Ruth and Heinz Arndt
- Writing career
- Genres: Sex and gender issues
- Subject: Men's rights activism
- Notable awards: Centenary Medal (2003); Member of the Order of Australia (2020)
- Website: www.bettinaarndt.com.au

Bettina Mary Arndt AM (born 1 August 1949) is an Australian writer and commentator who specialises in sex and gender issues. Starting as a sex therapist, she established her career in the 1970s publishing and broadcasting as well as writing several books. In the 2000s she abandoned feminism, and has since attracted controversy with her views on sexual abuse and domestic violence, and men's rights advocacy.

== Early life and education ==
Bettina Mary Arndt was born in Penrith, England, on 1 August 1949, the daughter of economist Heinz Arndt and Ruth (née Strohsahl), the youngest of three children. Her parents were German, and escaped Nazi Germany prior to World War II. They emigrated to Australia in 1945 and she grew up in Canberra.

In 1971, Arndt completed a Bachelor of Science degree at the Australian National University. She completed a Master of Clinical Psychology degree at the University of New South Wales in Sydney in 1973; her thesis was on orgasm dysfunction. She is not a registered clinical psychologist and has never been registered as a health practitioner.

== Career ==
=== Sex therapist and educator ===
After graduation, Arndt practised as one of Australia's first sex therapists in the early 1970s. In the early 1970s she was operating at a clinic in Sydney as a sexologist working mostly with women.

Arndt came to prominence in the 1970s by editing Forum, an Australian adult sex education magazine, which led to frequent radio and television appearances. She was appointed editor in 1974 and remained in the position until July 1982. This period of her career was the subject of a television documentary in the Australian Time of My Life series (2013), in which the presenter introduced Arndt as "the feisty young editor [who] taught us all we need to know, and more, about ... sex".

The Forum publication proved controversial in conservative circles, and in Queensland Parliament in 1977 MP Des Frawley said: "It is a dirty, filthy magazine." Queensland police also raided a newsagent, seizing copies of the magazine and requesting the proprietor to show cause.

Medical witnesses, including gynaecology professor Derek Llewellyn-Jones, presented evidence to a court hearing supporting Forum’s educative role in the court hearing on the matter. The Anglican Dean of Brisbane, Dean George, described Forum as "a very useful educational aid to inform the public, to correct misapprehensions and therefore relieve anxieties."

Between 1973 and 1976 the Australian Broadcasting Control Board had ruled that all TV and radio programs in which Arndt took part in had to be pre-recorded so that they could be approved by station management before being transmitted. The board explained that the ban was "imposed because most of her programs were during family viewing time... and parents wanted to have some control over the sexual information for their children."

She acknowledged that the Women's Movement had made physiological discoveries about the sexuality of women, that there was more tolerance of a person's sexual preference, and there had been a recognition of the importance of sex for senior citizens and those with disabilities. Arndt also praised the introduction of South Australian laws criminalising rape within marriage.

Her work in sex education also involved postgraduate courses, seminars and lectures for groups including doctors and other professionals. Following the death of her husband and business partner, Dennis Minogue, in 1981, Forum magazine closed. In the mid 1980s, Arndt wrote for Australian Playboy and also wrote about broader social issues for newspapers including The Sydney Morning Herald and The Age. During this period Arndt also had her own radio program on 2GB and regular radio segments in major cities all over Australia. In 1982 she appeared on the TV panel-show series Beauty and the Beast and, from 1981 to 1986, was a weekly guest on television program The Today Show.

In 1983, The Sydney Morning Herald described Arndt as "the person most strongly identified with Australia's sexual revolution".

In 1984, Arndt ran a mail-order lingerie and sex toy business and authored a number of books on sex advice, including The Bettina Arndt Guide to Lovemaking for Women, in which she wrote that "Looking at what's happening to men and women in bed today, it wouldn't surprise me at all if more and more males chose to stick to their beer. Sex is fast becoming a battlefield, with women calling more of the shots."

In 1986, Arndt moved to New York City for five years and, while living in the United States, wrote a weekly newspaper column syndicated through The Age in Melbourne (and published in Canberra, Adelaide, Perth and Brisbane). She had two books published featuring collections of her writings, Private Lives (1985) and All About Us (1989). In 1991, Arndt returned with her family to live in Australia.

=== Commentator and men's rights activist ===
From the 1990s onward Arndt wrote a personal advice column for Cleo, wrote for The Bulletin, The Australian and The Australian Women's Weekly. She was a guest reporter on Four Corners on ABC TV and a regular guest on ABC radio in Sydney, Melbourne, Canberra and Adelaide. She was on the board of the Australian National University and was the president of the board of the Royal Women's Hospital Foundation in 1999. She also served as an online dating coach from 2001 to 2017, and more recently has assisted men in writing their dating profiles and referring them on to good photographers for their dating profile photos.

During the first half of her career Arndt was a self-proclaimed feminist, but since the mid 1990s has turned to men's rights advocacy. Her later work encapsulated socially conservative ideas about relationships, family structures and children out of wedlock. In 2010, Arndt said "I spent my early career lobbying for women but turned to men when I realised how lousy they are about advocating for issues that affect their private lives." Kate Gleeson, a senior lecturer at Macquarie Law School who has studied her, says "Arndt's extolling of men's rights, as well as her critique of feminist analyses of domestic violence, sexual assault, sexual harassment and sex within marriage, has provoked feminist ire in the press", adding that "to Arndt's frustration, the male revolution she advocated of political reaction against feminism had failed to emerge."

In 1993, Arndt presented a Four Corners episode on ABC TV about alleged confusion over sexual consent titled "Yes, No, Maybe". She was criticised for downplaying rape by a group of Sydney sexual assault counsellors, who said of women who "have been raped, that in most instances they do not get a chance to say 'no'".

During the conservative Howard Government (1996–2007), Arndt was an adviser on issues such as assisted reproduction, education and child support. She served on a number of committees advising the Australian Government on policy matters, including the National Advisory Committee on Ageing (2003), the Assisted Reproductive Technologies Review Team (2005) and the Child Support Review Reference Group (2004). In 2003 the government awarded her the Centenary Medal, which recognises "people who made a contribution to Australian society or government". Gleeson observed that at this time Arndt had a "persistent criticism of matters of family law". A government committee she was part of from 2000 to 2001, the Family Law Pathways Advisory Group, was instrumental in later redrafting Australian family law.

In 2007, the Australian television program Media Watch demonstrated that a newspaper article written by Arndt for the Brisbane Courier Mail plagiarised large tracts of a Guardian article by Dick Taverne published three years earlier. The program also accused Arndt of journalistic non-disclosure in a column she wrote for The Sydney Morning Herald when she identified Kerryn Phelps's same-sex marriage to Ascham Girls' School teacher Jackie Stricker. Arndt failed to disclose that her daughter attended the school and Phelps holds Arndt partly responsible for ending her wife's career there. In her defence Arndt said that "I've never been anti-gay", saying she was merely reporting the anxieties of some Ascham parents.

Arndt wrote The Sex Diaries, based on the diaries of 98 couples talking about how they negotiate sex and deal with mismatched desire. It was published in 2009, followed by What Men Want, another diary project published in September 2010.

Her friend Merri Southwood said of Arndt's newspaper columns at the time, "I'm not sure how much of it is the author seeking an audience and how much is the genuine Bettina ... Because, in fact, the way she writes is sometimes a little at odds with her own personal life." Along with Australian rightwing commentators, Arndt celebrated the victory of Donald Trump in the 2016 US presidential elections. During this period she was also writing for The Spectator Australia.

After previously hosting her video social commentaries on YouTube, in 2019 Arndt began moving her online presence to Thinkspot an online free speech platform attracting members of the intellectual dark web (IDW). Her motivation for this was that YouTube had removed some of her videos saying that they had contravened regulations, but Arndt stated: "YouTube have been systematically censoring my videos ... because I am challenging the feminist narrative."

In 2020, Media Watch reported that "Arndt has been in the media for more than 40 years and has written for many of Australia's leading papers and magazines as sex therapist, social commentator and, most recently, outspoken men's rights advocate." But her comments on the murder of Hannah Clarke incident in 2020 had since led to near universal condemnation in the media, including those she had previously worked with. Media Watch questioned whether or not they would use her again in the future. When questioned about Arndt's time advising the Howard Government (1996–2007), Victorian Liberal shadow minister Tim Smith said: "I think Bettina Arndt has become more extreme as the years have gone by. I don't think she was nearly this extreme during the Howard Government years. I think some of her commentary of recent years has gone beyond mainstream Australia to the fringes." News Corp's David Penberthy lamented the loss of the Arndt of the 1970s and 1980s when she was a sex therapist and a "fun person ... trying to make couples happier through sex", saying she seems to have now "herded all of the really angry guys in Australia into the one corner and has, sort of, created almost a business model out of it".

From 2020, Arndt has commonly been termed a men's rights activist. She has said, "we need to start calling out feminism which is a really destructive force in our society". She believes there is a pervasive "anti-male bias" in society, media and the law – also extending into areas such as divorce, cancer research and domestic violence – saying that women are prioritised, thus denying men their rights. In 2012, Janet Albrechtsen wrote that Arndt "now argues that with women dominating public discussion of gender and sexual issues, men's views are being silenced". Arndt argues that "radical feminism, where men are presented as violent and sexist, is guilty of manshaming and destroying what should be a bond of mutual acceptance and respect between the sexes". Arndt has been accused of being hostile towards women. Author Susan Maushart says that Arndt "seems, for whatever reason, to not like women very much".

John Anderson, former Deputy Prime Minister of Australia, spoke out about the importance of Arndt's work saying "For me now what becomes the issue is what about that extraordinary in-depth research you do that needs to be taken seriously at a time when we are all at each other's throats, when it is all too common just to shut people down."

Commenting on the "attempts to cancel her voice in the public arena", Anderson commented that "Bettina has faced attempts to cancel her voice in the public arena and yet I think some of the work she is doing, some of the research she's putting forward on the failing of so many of our young men now cannot be ignored."

=== On partnerships and parenting ===
When Australia's first female prime minister, Julia Gillard (Labor), was elected in 2010, Arndt criticised the new prime minister for setting a bad example by living in a de facto relationship, or as Arndt described it, "marriage lite". Arndt also takes a conservative view on having children outside of marriage, and has questioned the dedication of mothers entering parliament.

Arndt has been criticised for dismissing genuine academic research when writing about the children of LGBTIQ parents. Former senator Brian Greig denounced Arndt for using "the work of 'researchers' with strong links to the American religious right" when discussing same-sex parenting, saying that she should have been "able to distinguish such research from sham, politically motivated studies".

=== Comments about sexual abuse ===
Arndt has been accused of downplaying the sexual abuse of children by adults. She has suggested that rape is not always violent and has said that most children do not incur long-term damage from sexual assault.

In 1997, Arndt defended a doctor who had molested a 12-year-old child and other patients including Arndt herself, arguing that he should not be charged because in another context masturbation would have been "a loving and pleasurable act".

In 2005, in an article in The Courier-Mail, Arndt discussed convicted paedophile Robert Potter, a scoutmaster who had molested four boys, one of whom subsequently attempted suicide. She described Potter as "a good bloke" and argued that "such minor abuse rarely has lasting consequences".

In a 2012 article she wrote that "Demonising sexuality inevitably distorts a proper perspective on sexual crimes, leading to politically inspired calls for absurdly longer sentences, misinformation about the likelihood of offenders to reoffend and exaggeration of the emotional damage to the victims of minor abuse" and that "Our prurient interest in sex crimes often robs the perpetrator of any chance of redemption—as the sad death of cricket commentator Peter Roebuck bears witness."

In 2017, Arndt conducted a 17-minute interview on her YouTube channel with Nicolaas Bester, a high school teacher in Tasmania who in 2011 was sentenced to two years and ten months jail for sexual assault, maintaining a sexual relationship with a 15-year-old student and possessing child pornography. He was subsequently jailed again for producing child exploitation material and bragging that the sexual abuse had been "awesome". In the video, Arndt was seen to laugh and referred to "sexually provocative behaviour from female students" and said young women should "behave sensibly and not exploit their seductive power to ruin the lives of men". Bester's victim subsequently criticised Arndt for supporting Bester and accusing her of "trivialising" and "laughing off" his crime, saying there "was no evidence of my provocative behaviour". "Not only is the interview disturbing because it gives a platform to a paedophile. It's not a truthful interview." Arndt was criticised for not seeking out the victim for her side of the story, and drew police attention by including the victim's real name and photo in the video without consent. Following widespread public outrage, Arndt apologised for her tone and said her interview was in poor taste, but in a later interview said of Bester that "He is not a pederast. He is not preying on kids."

=== Domestic violence ===
Arndt is a champion of male victims of domestic violence who have been abused by women and has said that the "real picture" of domestic violence is "where our official evidence shows at least a third of the victims are male". Domestic violence researcher, Greg Andresen, provides a detailed analysis using evidence from the Australian Bureau of Statistics official survey on domestic violence to show that a third of the victims of domestic violence are male. In a 2022 interview with former Deputy Prime Minister John Anderson, Arndt explained that "our best source of knowledge on the subject is a big research study involving 42 scholars from 22 countries, called the Partner Abuse State of Knowledge Project. They looked at 1700 peer reviewed articles, all research into domestic violence, and what they found was this overwhelming pattern of two way violence with women more often than men instigating violence." Jacinta Masters, from Gender Equity Victoria, says the statistics Arndt uses have "been roundly dismissed by experts as inaccurate and a misrepresentation". Australia's National Research Organisation for Women's Safety (ANROWS) says Arndt's "claims: 1) are inaccurate; and 2) appear to be more focussed on undermining the gains made to address violence against women, than genuine concern for men subjected to violence." Doctors Against Violence Towards Women (DAVTW) states that Arndt "has, for many years, been downplaying domestic violence – even in her language, she uses terms like the 'myth of domestic violence' and 'feminist narrative', so while we're trying to highlight it as a problem, she's casting doubt and doing the opposite of that."

Arndt is a critic of domestic violence campaigner Rosie Batty, saying that her campaigning "denies women's role in family violence" and that Batty has been "playing the feminist puppet". In her interview with John Anderson, Arndt explained; "We have this impression that we have this enormous risk of dangerous men out there. If you look at our official statistics, the Australian Bureau of Statistics Personal Safety Survey which is our best source of data on DV in this country, the latest survey shows 1.8% of women are physically assaulted by their partner or ex partner in previous year. We are talking about 1% of Australian men. Yet we have our media reporting there are dangerous men everywhere. It is such an insult to half our population, this sort of propaganda."

Arndt defended a comment by a Queensland police officer that a man who had killed his wife and children by immolation may have been a "husband being driven too far by issues".

=== 2018 "fake rape crisis" campus tour ===
Arndt claimed the high incidence of sexual assault and rape on Australian university campuses is a fiction cooked up by feminists. She had said there is a "manufactured rape crisis" on campuses fuelled by the Australian Human Rights Commission, where the institutions convene a "kangaroo court" once an allegation has been made where the male alleged to have raped the female has no chance of defence. In 2018–2019 she conducted her "fake rape crisis" university campus tour where she campaigned against changes to consent laws with her main argument being that rates of sexual harassment and assault on university campuses were being artificially inflated to stoke anti-male sentiment. University women's groups and anti-violence representatives said Arndt's events were "a misinformed and harmful attempt to undo the work of generations of student activists and advocates in combating the issues of sexual violence on campus" and that she was "mocking sexual assault survivors at [universities] around the country".

Arndt's "Fake Rape Crisis" university speaking tour was cited in the granting of her 2020 Order of Australia award. When referring to former federal Minister for Women Kate Ellis's advocacy for victims on campus, Arndt stated that "My campus work poses a direct threat to Ellis' longtime advocacy for victims of sexual assault."

==== Investigation by university ====
The student Liberal Club at Sydney University hosted Arndt's "Fake Rape Crisis Campus Tour" event and students protested her on-campus appearance. Afterwards Arndt lobbied and petitioned for an inquiry in an attempt to have the protest investigated and protesters disciplined by the university. The Saturday Paper reported that "Federal government ministers and conservative media personalities have been quick to praise Arndt as the latest free speech hero threatened by a censorious left-wing culture on university campuses." Her lobbying was successful and a nine-month long university inquiry was initiated. Upon conclusion, the investigation found the protest did not breach any freedom of speech principles and one protester was disciplined. Arndt dismissed the inquiry's findings. Katharine Gelber, a Professor of Politics and Public Policy at the University of Queensland, concluded that "the idea that her free speech has been violated by the actions of a small group of protestors is absurd". Gelber reported that Arndt's actions were "deliberately provocative, and when she got her desired response, she made mileage out of it. In fact, after Sydney University's internal inquiry was completed, she publicly identified some of the protestors who were named in the confidential report, which resulted in two young people being subjected to trolling online, and at least one being subjected to rape threats." The university criticised Arndt for failing to respect the confidentiality of the investigation.

=== 2020 Order of Australia award ===
Arndt was appointed a Member of the Order of Australia (AM) in the 2020 Australia Day Honours "for significant service to the community as a social commentator, and to gender equity through advocacy for men". Among other significant services to the community, the citation for Arndt's honour from the Council for the Order of Australia highlights her "Campus Tour, since 2018" (known as the "Fake Rape Crisis" Campus Tour), and for being a contributor to "Jordan Peterson's Thinkspot, since 2019" (an anti-censorship website).

Arndt's appointment sparked a petition on Change.org calling for the honour to be revoked and had reached 33,000 signatures within the first week. The award also drew a reaction from prominent Australian women and abuse survivors, with 2015 Australian of the Year and domestic violence campaigner Rosie Batty saying she felt "sickened" and "utterly dismayed" by it. Bester's sexual assault victim, Grace Tame, said that "I believe that honouring someone who actively defended a pedophile on a public platform is a blatant example of the protracted, systemic moral corruption that still hampers our society." Sharna Bremner, from End Rape on Campus Australia, said she also felt sick after hearing of the award to Arndt and to "see someone like her be rewarded for mocking those people that have been sexually assaulted sends a message that sexual assault doesn't matter in this country, survivors don't matter, it's a huge slap in the face." Arndt responded by saying the criticism shows "the poisonous side of modern feminism and their determination to shut down anyone who challenges the orthodoxy".

Victorian attorney-general Jill Hennessy wrote to the Governor-General, David Hurley, urging that Arndt be stripped of the award, saying that "Ms Arndt's views and activities diminish the devastating experiences of victim-survivors of family and sexual violence, promote division and encourage victim-survivors from taking steps to ensure their survival and safety." Law professor Augusto Zimmermann responded to Hennessy’s intervention by stating that:

One must speak out loud and clear about domestic violence against anyone, either male or female. This is why recognising that men are also victims of domestic violence is so important. Therefore, I would like to congratulate Ms Arndt on a well-deserved award. I hope she will be able to continue her fundamental work as too many people are too afraid to take on the feminists the way she does. We can only wish this country had more brave and courageous people like Ms Arndt to fight against the sexist biases of governments such as Victoria’s, and to champion the cause of justice and equality for all, regardless of gender or ideological considerations.

Doctors Against Violence Towards Women (DAVTW) also called for Arndt's award to be withdrawn. Sue Williamson from the University of New South Wales in Canberra noted that the Governor-General can revoke an award if the awardee "has behaved or acted in a manner that has brought disrepute on the order".

In February 2020, following controversy about Arndt's comments on a domestic violence quadruple murder-suicide in Queensland, Liberal MP Tim Smith wrote to the chairman of the Council of the Order of Australia, Shane Stone, calling for her award to be revoked. Arndt had said,

Congratulations to the Queensland police for keeping an open mind and awaiting proper evidence, including the possibility that Rowan Baxter might have been 'driven too far'. But note the misplaced outrage. How dare police deviate from the feminist script of seeking excuses ... [...].

Within days many politicians from the Liberal Party, Labor and the Greens were also calling for her award to be revoked, including the Federal Minister for Women, Marise Payne.

On 25 February 2020, the Australian Senate passed a motion calling for the revocation of the award, with Pauline Hanson and Malcolm Roberts being the only senators to vote against. Rowan Dean on Sky News said he was horrified by the way this had been politicized, pointing out the motion before the senate misrepresented the fact that Arndt had quoted the policeman. "The senate condemned Bettina Arndt for a comment the most offensive part of which were not her words." Describing the senators as "hypocrites and cowards" and saying that "the Senate was using the overwhelming power of government to crush one individual for expressing a point of view they did not agree with, in complete violation of the fundamental principle of freedom of speech."

In response to the senate vote Arndt said conservative MPs had "caved in" to "feminist power" and urged her supporters to "maintain the rage" and mobilise against what she believes are "feral mobs trying to take [her] out". Following the senate motion, the Governor-General's secretary Paul Singer told a senate estimates committee that the Governor-General would not unilaterally revoke the award, "because in practice the Governor-General does always act on the advice and recommendations of [the Council for the Order of Australia]". While refusing to comment on Arndt's case specifically, he also noted in relation to past removals that they "largely attribute to legal proceedings having been exhausted" and confirmed that some recipients convicted of serious charges retained their awards while still undergoing appeals. Psychiatrist Tanveer Ahmed wrote,

Despite the term hysterical being criticised as having a sexist history and connotation, it is difficult to describe the reaction to Bettina Arndt's Australia Day honours as anything but. The complaints accusing Arndt of supposedly sympathising with a paedophile and other such alleged misdemeanours are just a smokescreen for her real crime – betraying the feminist cause by prosecuting problems faced by men and boys.

In September 2020, it was reported that Arndt would retain her Australia Day award after the council announced that they were only prepared to strip awards if they were found to be based on false or misleading information or if the awardee had been convicted of a crime and all legal avenues of appeal had been exhausted.

=== Sex therapist credentials ===
Arndt has never been registered as a health practitioner. In 2020, an investigation by the New Matilda uncovered how media and publishers frequently misrepresented Arndt as a psychologist, clinical psychologist or doctor. The back cover of the 2009 edition of her book The Sex Diaries states that "Bettina Arndt is a clinical psychologist" and "she draws on her thirty-five years of experience as a sex therapist and psychologist". Arndt, however, is not a registered psychologist, clinical psychologist, or medical doctor, nor does she have a doctoral degree. The article pointed out that Arndt herself distributed material containing these misrepresentations without correcting them. In response, Arndt stated that she never described herself in this way, saying that "I've had a 45-year career. I say I trained as a clinical psychologist, I explain my career, whenever I'm asked to do a CV or put it out publicly. But people still introduce me in the wrong way." When she began her career, she did not need to register as a psychologist, but registration was introduced by the Psychologists Act 1989 (NSW). The Australian Health Practitioner Regulation Agency (AHPRA) investigated the allegations but declined to take legal action, instead cautioning Arndt, strongly urging her to take action when the media and publishers described her qualifications incorrectly and to avoid promoting content where she had been described incorrectly.

== Personal life ==
Arnd married journalist Dennis Minogue in 1977; he died in 1981. Arndt and Minogue were business partners during this time. Her second marriage was to American corporate lawyer Warren Scott in 1986. They were married in Watsons Bay, Sydney, and divorced in 2007. During the years 1986 to 1991 she lived with Scott in the borough of Manhattan in New York City. Arndt has one daughter and two sons.

== Selected works ==
- Female Forum: The Key to Being a Sexy, Healthy Woman in Australia Today. Paddington, NSW: Lilliput Publications. 1980. ISBN 9780959413311. OCLC 27629863.
- The Bettina Arndt guide to lovemaking. Woollahra, New South Wales: Tinmin in association with Murray Publishers. 1982. OCLC 215493735.
- Sex: The Apes and Us. Perth, WA: Murdoch University Press. 1983. ISBN 9780869050699. OCLC 220233463.
- The Australian Way of Sex. Sydney, NSW: Horwitz Grahame. 1985. ISBN 9780725518127. OCLC 222723547.
- Private lives. Ringwood, Victoria: Penguin. 1986. ISBN 9780140088502.
- All about us. Ringwood, Victoria: Penguin. 1989. ISBN 9780140128574.
- Taking sides: men, women and the shifting social agenda. Milsons Point, New South Wales: Random House. 1995. ISBN 9780091830588.
- The sex diaries. Carlton, Victoria: Melbourne University Press. 2009. ISBN 9780522855555.
- What Men Want: In Bed. Melbourne University Press. 2010. ISBN 9780522861389.
- #MenToo. Melbourne, Victoria: Wilkinson Publishing. 2018. ISBN 9781925642650.
