= Domestic violence in Australia =

Family violence in Australia

In Australia, domestic violence (DV) is defined by the Family Law Act 1975. Each state and territory also has its own legislation, some of which broadens the scope of that definition, and terminology varies. It has been identified as a major health and welfare issue. Family violence occurs across all ages and demographic groups, but mostly affects women and children, and at particular risk are three groups: Indigenous, young and pregnant women.

Statistics are difficult to extract and assess, owing to the way they are collected and the fact that many go unreported, but a 2018 report by the AIHW revealed that one in six women and one in nine men were physically and/or sexually abused before the age of 15, and a 2016 survey of the data showed that one in six women and one in 20 men had experienced at least one incidence of violence from a current or former partner since the age of 15 (or 23 per cent men, 77 per cent women).

One case which achieved major media coverage, the murder of 11-year-old Luke Batty by his father in February 2014, led to a Royal Commission into Family Violence in Victoria. His mother, Rosie Batty AO, achieved national prominence by her campaigning on the issue, and had considerably influence on national public attitudes, philanthropy, government initiatives and funding, support services and police and legal procedures related to domestic violence in Australia. Another prominent case was the murder of Hannah Clarke and her children by her estranged husband in Queensland in 2020.

== National legislation ==
The Family Law Act 1975 defines domestic violence as "violent, threatening or other behaviour by a person that coerces or controls a member of the person's family, or causes the family member to be fearful".

The Act refers to acts of violence that occur between people who have, or have had, an intimate relationship in domestic settings. Domestic violence includes violence between partners of both sexes, including same-sex relationships. However, the term can be altered by each state's legislation, which can broaden the spectrum of domestic violence; for example in Victoria, where violence in family-like relationships, and witnessing any type of violence in the family, are also defined as a family violence. Terminology also varies from state to state, with some states using the terms "family violence", "domestic and family violence" or "domestic abuse".

== Incidence and statistics ==
Statistics are difficult to extract and assess, owing to the way they are collected and the fact that many go unreported. A 2013 NSW survey of 300 victims revealed that only around 50% reported the most recent incident to police, usually because of fear of revenge or further violence. The 2016 ABS Personal Safety Survey showed that around 95% of men and 80% of women who were victims of violence from their current partners had never reported it to police. Over time, however, numbers have increased, at least partly because more people are reporting it.

Family violence recorded incidents in Australia
Region	Date range	Description	Recorded incidents
Victoria	2015	Family incidents	74,385
Queensland	2014-15	Domestic violence occurrences	71,777
NSW	2014-15	Domestic violence related incidents	65,120
Tasmania	2014-15	Family violence arguments and incidents	4,410
WA	2014-15	Domestic Assaults	16,461
ACT	2014-15	Family violence incidents reported	2,876
NT	2015	Domestic violence assaults	3,970
SA	2016	Domestic violence matters reported	25,029
Australia			264,028

On average between 2010 and 2012, every 10 days a female died as a result of family violence, with a total of 75 over the period, while in 2015, females accounted for almost two thirds (65%) of all victims of FDV–related homicide in Australia in 2015 (103 victims)

In 2014, the Australian Bureau of Statistics (ABS) recorded 95 victims of family and domestic violence-related homicides. This statistic included all family related homicide victims including children, men and women. With the largest numbers of victims in Victoria (32), followed by New South Wales (30).

Between 2014 and 2015, 2,800 women and 560 men were hospitalised after being assaulted by a spouse or partner.

As a total of figures reported by each state and territory using data collected for a year each spanning the years 2014 and 2016, there were 264,028 domestic violence incidents reported and recorded by police.

According to the Personal Safety Survey by the ABS in 2016, 1.7% of women and 0.8% of men surveyed reported experiencing violence from an intimate partner in the previous 12 months. However, 82.1% of women and 97.2% of men who had experienced violence from a current partner never contacted the police, and 46% of women and 68% of men did not seek advice or support from any source, with the most common reasons being thought they could deal with it themselves, not serious enough to see help and did not want or need help.

An ABC Fact Check (2016) pointed out that "the national dataset is not able to identify the frequency or severity of victims' experience of violence, a shortcoming that could obscure substantial differences in how men and women experience of domestic violence in Australia". Its survey of the data showed that one in six women and one in 20 men had experienced at least one incidence of violence from a current or former partner since the age of 15 (or 23 per cent men and 77 per cent women).

A 2016 paper reported that from 121,251 domestic violence incidents recorded over a two-year period in Victoria, more than 21% involved alcohol by either or both parties.

A report by Australian Institute of Health and Welfare (AIHW) in 2018, entitled Family, domestic and sexual violence in Australia, noted that while family violence occurs across all ages and demographic groups, it mostly affects women and children, and at particular risk are Indigenous, young and pregnant women. The report revealed that 1 in 6 (approximately 1.5 million) women and 1 in 9 (approximately 992,000) men were physically and/or sexually abused before the age of 15, and 1 in 5 (1.7 million) women and 1 in 20 (428,000) men had been sexually assaulted and/or threatened since the age of 15. It reported that 72,000 women, 34,000 children and 9,000 men employed homelessness services in 2016–17 due to domestic violence.

A follow-up report published in 2019 by AIHW looked at the impact of family, domestic and sexual violence among vulnerable groups, including children, older people, people with disability, LGBTIQ+ people, and Indigenous Australians.

In the wake of the murder of Hannah Clarke and her children by her estranged husband in 2020, it was revealed that between 2000 and 2019, an estimated 1,038 Australian children were bereaved by domestic homicide–the child's mother was murdered, and women had either left or were in the process of leaving their partner.

A 2020 government document citing the 2016 ABS report states that one in four women and one in 13 men have experienced at least one incident of violence by a current or former partner since the age of 15, and the same proportion of women, but one in six men had experienced emotional abuse since that age.

== Funding and counter-measures ==
=== 1990s ===
In 1996, the ABS held a national survey entitled "Women's Safety Survey", which provided the first comprehensive national data on all forms of violence against women.

In 1997, John Howard, then prime minister of Australia, brought together the heads of all states and territories and acknowledged the domestic violence phenomena across Australia and set to work together to resolve the issue. In the same year, the Commonwealth Government of Australia committed A$50 million to test preventative measures and practices to address domestic violence. The program was called "Partnerships Against Domestic Violence" and was funded until 2003. Along with this funding, Centrelink started providing emergency crisis payments to women who were victims of domestic violence.

During that same year, the federal government established the Partnerships programme, which provided A$157 million for each state and territory for the Supported Accommodation Assistance Programme, providing transitional support and accommodation to homeless people, many of whom were women escaping domestic violence.

By 2016 the Partnerships programme had sponsored more than 100 projects to explore practices at local, regional and national levels. Those projects included development of competency standards, worker training, research into domestic violence, community awareness products and better coordination systems between police and the justice system. The program also established the Australian Domestic Violence Clearinghouse, which gathers research and publications from each state and territory of Australia and internationally.

In 1997–2001, the National Indigenous Family Violence Grants Programme was initiated by the government, providing A$6 million over the 4-year period. The grant was aimed at helping local Indigenous communities to reduce family violence. They were assisted by a mentoring team which provided advice on project management, self-documentation and self-evaluation.

=== 2000s ===
In 2001 the government established the National Initiative to Combat Sexual Assault (NICSA) with funding of A$16.5m over four years and administered by the Office of the Status of Women. In 2004–2005, an additional A$6.7m was granted to NICSA.

Between August and December 2005, the ABS conducted another Personal Safety Survey. They interviewed 16,400 people in all states and territories. The release of the survey findings on 21 Aug 2006 included comparison to the 1996 Women's Safety Survey. The findings showed that the physical threat had dropped significantly from 1996 to 2005.

In March 2009, the Department of Social Services released an economic report entitled The Cost of Violence against Women and their Children. The report revealed that between 2002 and 2003, the cost of domestic violence was estimated at A$8.1 billion. The report also showed that if no action were taken against this phenomenon, by 2021–2022 the figure would double, amounting to A$15.6 billion, with the largest contributor being pain, suffering and premature mortality, estimated at A$7.5 billion.

=== 2010s ===
The first National Plan to Reduce Violence against Women and their Children 2010–2022 (National Plan) was established by the Commonwealth Government and all state and territory governments of Australia.

In July 2013, Natasha Stott Despoja was the founding chair of Our Watch, then named Foundation to Prevent Violence Against Women and their Children. A joint initiative of the Victorian and Commonwealth governments, the organisation is based in Melbourne.

The Luke Batty case in February 2014 and subsequent campaigning by his mother, Rosie Batty AO, led to widespread publicity. Her advocacy had considerably influence on national public attitudes, philanthropy, government initiatives and funding, support services and police and legal procedures related to domestic violence in Australia. Batty became Australian of the Year in 2015.

On 16 May 2014, Australia's National Research Organisation for Women's Safety (ANROWS), an independent, not-for-profit research organisation, was established under the National Plan.

In March 2015, the Australian Senate under the Finance and Public Administration References Committee, issued an interim report regarding domestic violence in Australia. The interim report contained a total of eight recommendations. The recommendation of "inclusion of respectful relationships education in the national curriculum" was one that provided an opportunity to create a positive change, starting with children. The interim report followed, among others, the submission from Australian Women Against Violence Alliance (AWAVA) regarding the domestic violence issue. AWAVA conducted its own research into the matter and issued a number of recommendations, including the inclusion of respectful relationships in youth education. After a pilot scheme involving 19 schools, the "Respectful Relationships" program was rolled out across all Victorian Government schools from prep to year 12.

On 24 September 2015, then prime minister Malcolm Turnbull announced a funding of another A$100 million for measures to protect victims of domestic violence. In 2016, the government announced a three-year plan for tackling domestic violence entitled "Family and Domestic Violence Strategy 2016—2019". Turnbull announced at a Council of Australian Governments (COAG) meeting on 1 April 2016 that all government leaders would be convening to tackle the issue at a national summit in October 2016.

Prior to 25 November 2017, domestic violence orders (aka intervention orders) only applied in the state or territory in which they were issued or registered. From that date the National Domestic Violence Order Scheme was implemented, which includes the provision that all DV orders would henceforth be automatically nationally recognised and enforceable.

On 20 April 2018 Sam Mostyn was appointed as a director to the board of ANROWS, and she was made chair by 2019.

=== 2020s ===
The Morrison government strategy is described in the Services Australia document "Family and Domestic Violence Strategy 2020–23". In November 2021 Minister for Women Marise Payne announced funding of A$22.4 million over five years to set up a Domestic, Family and Sexual Violence Commission, which would oversee the implementation of the new National Plan to end violence against women and children. The federal government provided A$260 million in funding under its "National Partnership on Family, Domestic and Sexual Violence Responses", with an additional amount later allocated to the Northern Territory to combat Indigenous family violence.

On 17 October 2022, the Australian (now under Anthony Albanese), state and territory governments released the National Plan to End Violence against Women and Children 2022–2032, to follow the previous 12-year National Plan.

== Indigenous family violence ==
The rate of family violence in Indigenous Australian communities, especially in the Northern Territory, is high. A 2002 National Aboriginal and Torres Strait Islander Social Survey reported that, in the 12 months preceding the survey, 24 per cent of Aboriginal or Torres Strait Islander people aged 15 years or over had been a victim of physical or threatened violence. The Indigenous population was experiencing family violence at over twice the rate of the non-Indigenous population, and the problem was worst in remote areas. However a 2006 publication by the Australian Institute of Health and Welfare reported:

The true extent of family violence is difficult to determine due to under-reporting by victims, lack of appropriate screening by service providers, incomplete identification of Indigenous people in many data sets and problems of quality and comparability of existing data.

Prominent Indigenous academic Marcia Langton, when appearing on ABC Television's Q&A in 2016, said that the rate of violence against Indigenous women was around 34 times greater than the national rate, and, in the worst areas, up to 80 times. Fact-checking by The Conversation showed that she was broadly correct, although accurate figures were not available.

There is no single cause for this high rate, but several probable causes or aggravating factors have been suggested by various researchers and stakeholders, including: dispossession of land and subsequent displacement of communities, childhood abuse experienced by the Stolen Generations, along with intergenerational trauma and high levels of disadvantage. Other factors which can contribute include gendered violence caused by more rigid gender norms, mental health, history of incarceration and alcohol and other drug use. An AIHW survey covering eight years to 2019, published in December 2021, revealed that Aboriginal and Torres Strait Islander people comprised 28 per cent of all hospitalisations due to family violence, despite only making up 3.3% of the total population. Various reasons were suggested by experts, including Aboriginal men's control of decision-making, and limited independence for women owing to economic factors; barriers in access to services; racism by some police and other services; and lack of enough Aboriginal-run organisations providing culturally safe services.

As the federal government was drafting its new national strategy in September 2021, prominent Indigenous leaders urged Women's Safety Minister Anne Ruston to develop a separate, targeted plan for the Indigenous community. At the National Women's Safety Summit in September 2021, Aboriginal and Torres Strait Islander Social Justice Commissioner June Oscar said that a "one-size-fits-all-attitude" would not work to protect Indigenous women. Marcia Langton said that the current plan had not worked, because nobody had listened to Indigenous women in the communities.

In February 2022, Ruston announced that an extra A$10.7 million would be allocated "to boost frontline services in the Northern Territory in response to the chronic rates of violence and to work towards our Closing the Gap commitments", in addition to the funding already committed to the National Partnership on Family, Domestic and Sexual Violence Responses. The National Partnership provided funding to each of the states for various frontline services.

In February 2026 a new national plan was launched to guide actions to end violence against Aboriginal and Torres Strait Islander women and children.

== Australian Capital Territory ==
In 1997, the Domestic Violence Prevention Council (DVPC) was established under the Domestic Violence Agencies Act 1986 as an independent statutory body. ACT Policing is a member of DVPC.

In October 2015, in a bid to tackle the family violence, ACT Policing launched the Family Violence Coordination Unit.

In 2016, the ACT Government reviewed the level of domestic violence response by different agencies and in June 2016, it accepted all the findings, and released a report entitled Response to Family Violence. In the released report, among others, the government pledged a Family Violence Statement to the ACT Legislative Assembly every year and a $21.47 million package over 4 years. Under the same commitment, the government acknowledged the fact that the emotional, physical and financial abuse were not part of the Domestic Violence Agencies Act 1986, and the victims were not protected from such abuse. It pledged to change the Act and to better protect the victims.

With the 2016–2017 budget, the ACT Government set a new precedent in Australia when it introduced an annual A$30 domestic violence levy on all households.

Sections 156A–165 of the Family Violence Protection Act 2008 define the ACT police powers. They include ACT police officers having (for the purpose of preventing family violence) the power to enter private premises without warrant and search and seizing firearms.

== New South Wales ==
In 1990 Redfern Legal Centre established the Women's Domestic Violence Court Assistance Scheme (WDVCAS) in to provide a range of specialist legal and support services to women at court seeking apprehended violence orders. This holistic service model, including the concept of a safe room, was subsequently expanded and adapted to the conditions and resources available at other local courts throughout NSW and other parts of Australia. Like the NSW Women's Refuge Movement the WDVCAS has struggled to secure adequate government funding throughout its existence and was put through a tender process despite opposition within the sector.

On 14 October 2015, Pru Goward, the NSW Minister for the Prevention of Domestic Violence, stated that the government would provide a $60m package to tackle some of the most serious domestic violence problems. From those, $15m will fund 6 domestic violence 'High Risk Offender Teams', $4.1m for 24 new domestic violence liaison officers, $19.5m into mandated perpetrator behaviour change programs to provide treatment for offenders (to treat them just like those for drug or alcohol addictions). Another $20m would be spent for increasing the housing for those affected, $2.3m for police partnerships with other organisations and $1.3m over four years to increase the numbers of sexual assault nurse examiners in rural areas.

A 2020 NSW Bureau of Crime Statistics and Research study comparing domestic violence committed by all men and women in New South Wales to that committed by Aboriginal men and women found that Aboriginal women are eight times more likely to be perpetrators of domestic violence than women in general (nearly 800 per 100,000 compared with just over 100 per 100,000), and they were more than twice as violent as men in general (about 300 per 100,000). While domestic violence by Aboriginal men had decreased in 2019 compared to 2010, that perpetrated by women had increased (from around 600).

=== Domestic Violence Disclosure Scheme ===
In March 2015, New South Wales Premier Mike Baird announced a pilot of the Domestic Violence Disclosure Scheme (DVDS). DVDS is an adaptation of Clare's Law, which was seen as a success in the United Kingdom. Through the scheme, victims are given the option to seek out information about his/her partner regarding any history of domestic violence. In the future, the scheme could also be extended to friends and family members who may have concerns about the affected person's partner. A "right to ask" model was proposed, similar to that in the UK.

The DVDS, an Australian first, was piloted from April 2016 in four NSW Police Force Areas: Oxley (Tamworth region); Shoalhaven (Nowra region); Sutherland (Menai/Engadine/Sutherland region); and St George (Kogarah/Hurstville region). It was announced in May 2018 that the trial would be extended to June 2019.

Only a person of 16 years of age or older can make an application. Indifferent of the domestic partner's criminal history, the disclosure, it would be made within two weeks from the date of the application, in person by a police officer assisted by a social worker. Information disclosed include relevant convictions of family violence, other serious convictions such as sexual offences, child abuse offences or murder and the date of conviction (case by case). A third party to a relationship can make an application of disclosure, similar to that of a person at risk application. The third party must be a family member, friend or a professional that has ongoing relationship with the person who may be at risk. Police can disclose the information to the person at risk only, within two weeks of the application, in the presence of a specialist social worker. The third party who has made the application can be present at the disclosure, provided that he or she is invited by the person at risk for whom the application was made.

== Northern Territory ==
The Domestic and Family Violence Act 2007 operates in the Northern Territory (NT).

Rates of domestic violence in the NT were the highest in the nation in 2020. There was an increase from 1,635 to 1,815 victims per 100,000 between 2016 and 2017; by contrast, in Western Australia, the second highest, the rate dropped from 725 to 684 in the same period. During the first months of lockdowns brought in during the COVID-19 pandemic in Australia, DV-related assaults increased by up to 25 per cent in parts of Central Australia, with many of them ascribed to having more people having to stay in the home. However women's shelters in Alice Springs and Tennant Creek were not as much in demand as usual, largely because people were stuck out in community. More horrific injuries were ascribed to greater consumption of alcohol than usual.

After submissions by many stakeholders and experts, including the Law Society NT, NT Council of Social Service (NTCOSS) and the NT Women's Legal Service, the Justice Legislation Amendment (Domestic and Family Violence) Bill 2019 was passed on 25 June 2020, making amendments to the Domestic and Family Violence Act, the Bail Act 1982, the Criminal Code, and the Sentencing Act 1995. Three important changes were introduced, the most significant of which was the creation of a new offence of "choking, suffocation and strangulation in a domestic relationship". The others are allowing a tenancy agreement to be terminated without replacement, as part of a DV order; and enabling defendants in domestic violence proceedings to attend rehabilitation programs more easily.

The Tangentyere Women's Family Safety Group was co-founded by R Rubuntja, a prominent anti-domestic violence campaigner. Comprising a number of senior women from Alice Springs town camps, the group works to end family violence and "to bring visibility to Aboriginal women's experiences". In January 2021, R Rubuntja, aged 46, was murdered by her partner, who had a history of violent offences. She had been known for her advocacy: in 2017, she spoke to politicians in Parliament House, Canberra, about domestic violence in Central Australia, and helped to organise a large women's march against violence in Alice Springs. She was elected Town Camp President of her community at Anthepe town camp in 2019. Australian National University researcher Chay Brown, who had worked with R Rubuntja, said that the system wasn't working, and had failed her colleague. She suggested that if certain information had been shared between local organisations and Northern Territory Police that "privileges women and children's safety above any man's right to confidentiality", as exists in some other jurisdictions in Australia, it would have been clear that she was in danger.

In February 2022, Minister for Women Anne Ruston announced that an extra A$10.7 million (in addition to funding already committed to the National Partnership) would be allocated "to boost frontline services in the Northern Territory in response to the chronic rates of violence and to work towards our Closing the Gap commitments", in addition to the funding already committed to the National Partnership on Family, Domestic and Sexual Violence Responses.

== Queensland ==
In 2012 the Domestic and Family Violence Protection Act 2012 was established, replacing the Domestic and Family Violence Protection Act 1989, to reflect contemporary understandings of domestic and family violence.

The murders of Hannah Clarke and her children by her estranged husband in Queensland in 2020 shocked the nation, and led to calls to change the laws governing post-separation arrangements for children.

== South Australia ==
In South Australia, the domestic violence is defined and regulated by the Intervention Orders (Prevention of Abuse) Act 2009, which replaced the Domestic Violence Act 1994. Under the Act, the meaning of abuse either domestic or non‑domestic, includes physical, sexual, emotional, psychological or economic abuse. This includes damaging the property or possession of the person or property enjoyed by the person, unreasonable denial of financial, social or personal autonomy.

On 22 March 2011, Zahra Abrahimzadeh died after being stabbed repeatedly by her husband at the Adelaide Convention Centre. A coronial inquest was initiated by the state coroner and 10 recommendations were issued. Normally, the coroner would issue recommendations to the SAPOL Commissioner of Police; however, in this instance, the coroner issued to findings to the premier of South Australia, who in turn brought it to the attention of the Commissioner of Police. As a direct consequence of the coroner's recommendations, the Women's Domestic Violence Court Assistance Service (WDVCAS) was launched in 2015, which provides victims with free legal advice and is funded by the Victims of Crime levy.

In South Australia, between 2014 and 2015, the overall crime figures fell to 2010 levels, while the domestic violence incidents increased by 8%, from 6720 in 2014 to 7740 in 2015.

On 12 April 2016, a parliamentary committee issued a report into the domestic violence problem in South Australia. With it, the committee also issued 35 recommendations to help the government tackle the problem. The committee recommended that more funding for crisis accommodation should be provided; there should be consistency of intervention orders to protect the victim across state borders; and there was a need for more education for magistrates and GPs to deal with the victims of domestic violence. The Attorney-General of South Australia also issued eight discussion papers relating to domestic violence.

As part of the National Domestic Violence Order Scheme, the Government of South Australia provided A$1.3m to South Australia Police (SAPOL) to implement a system to share information on domestic violence orders with other jurisdictions of Australia in its 2016–2017 budget.

By comparison to the other Australian states, SAPOL formerly had fewer powers in dealing with domestic violence (2009), but from 1 January 2019 a raft of new laws targeting the perpetrators of domestic violence came into effect, giving authorities stronger tools to tackle repeat and serious offenders.

The Royal Commission into Domestic, Family and Sexual Violence was established in 2024, headed by Natasha Stott Despoja, following a week in November 2023 when four women were killed in separate incidents in SA. On 19 August 2025 the Royal Commission published its 600-page report, which included 136 recommendations for changes. Finding that the system and responses were fragmented and ineffective, the report recommended an all-of-government approach, including:

- A separate ministerial portfolio for domestic, family and sexual violence
- A five-year strategy that includes prevention, early intervention, response, and recovery and healing
- Raising the domestic, family, and sexual violence portfolio to branch or service level within SAPOL, and providing training for all officers
- An increase in funding for family violence separate to funding for homelessness services.

== Tasmania ==
In 2003 the Tasmanian Government released Options Paper Safe at Home: A Criminal Justice Framework for Responding to Family Violence in Tasmania. Its aim was to provide a framework for the discussion of legislative and justice-related service delivery options. Before this, in Tasmania the term family violence" or "domestic violence" was not defined in legislation. The term "family violence" has been preferred to the other. The paper analysed actions and legislation of the other states and has set the standards for the action against family violence in Tasmania.

The Family Violence Act 2004 was adopted on 17 December 2004.As of 2016 it referred only to the context of a spouse or partner relationship. In the Family Violence Act 2004, as opposed to the national Family Law Act 1975 and other states such as Victoria where family violence has a broader meaning, the Tasmanian Government elected to strictly define family violence criminally, economically and emotionally.

In October 2013, Tasmanian Police stated that the family violence incidents in Tasmania were on a decreasing trend for the past several years. However, in May 2015 Tasmania Police revealed that the numbers were too high, with more than 50 new cases each week, a figure the police commissioner Darren Hine called "horrific". In May 2016, Hine stated that 400 more incidents were reported compared with the same period of 2015, a 20% increase from the, w previous year, with still between 40% and 80% incidents not being reported.

On 31 August 2015, the government released Safe Homes, Safe Families: Tasmania's Family Violence Action Plan 2015-2020 program to tackle family violence. Through this plan, the government committed an additional A$25.57 million over four years.

A review of the Family Violence Act 2004 was carried out in March 2008. It was amended in October 2019.

Tasmania Police have various powers under the Justices Act 1959 and the Police Offences Act 1935 to respond to family violence situations. The Family Violence Act 2004 gave police new powers to deal with family violence, such as: entering private property, arresting perpetrators for issuing family violence orders and search of person and premises. Under Tasmanian law, a police officer is authorised to enter and remain on premises without warrant and use force to prevent family violence at the request of the person who apparently resides on the premises. The police officer can also enter premises if he or she reasonably suspects that family violence is being, has been, or is likely to be committed on those premises.

== Victoria ==
Victoria has been at the forefront of family violence policy development and reform in Australia for the past 15 years and has been influential in propelling reforms in other Australian and international jurisdictions.

In 2002, the Victorian Law Reform Commission's review of family violence laws sparked a number of changes in Victoria. The Law Reform Commission was part of the 2005 integrated service system developed by the Victorian Government. Among those, the Magistrates Court of Victoria introduced a specialist Family Violence Court Division, integrated family violence support services, Magistrates’ Court Family Violence Taskforce and released its own paper entitled Response to Family Violence 2015–2017.

In 2008, the Victorian Government introduced new laws to tackle family violence. As such, the Family Violence Protection Act 2008 was adopted and, for the first time, broad family, past relationships and "family-like" relationships are included in the law. The Family Violence Protection Act 2008 states:

Family violence is any behaviour that in any way controls or dominates a family member and causes them to feel fear for their own, or other family member's safety or well-being. It can include physical, sexual, psychological, emotional or economic abuse and any behaviour that causes a child to hear, witness, or otherwise be exposed to the effects of that behaviour.

The Act also recognises that violence also occurs in gay and lesbian relationships at similar levels to heterosexual relationships, although some forms of abuse are unique for people who identify as gay, lesbian, bisexual, transgender or intersex.

In the 2015–2016 Victorian budget, the government provided $81.3 million to support the work of the Royal Commission into Family Violence. In addition to the direct family violence found insertion, a further $257 million was provided to child protection services and $48.1 to Child FIRST to improve early intervention. In 2016, following a Royal Commission into Family Violence, the Victorian government committed $572m to tackle the problem. The premier Daniel Andrews pledged to "overhaul our broken support system from the bottom up", quoting the statistic that in 2015, 37 Victorians had been murdered by a family member.

In 2017, the Victorian Government had another review of its action plan to tackle Family Violence. In the review, the government made some significant changes to tackle the family violence problem and provided a 10-year plan. As part of this, it introduced the "Respectful relationships" program for schools after a successful trial in 2016.

=== Statistics ===
Victoria Police Crime Statistics Official release regarding the family violence incidents.

Rate per 100,000 Victorian population
	2009–2010	2010–2011	2011–2012	2012–2013	2013–2014
Family Incidents	658.4	742.0	894.6	1,065.4	1,129.2
Where Charges Laid	173.2	219.9	322.6	453.0	507.7
Where Children Present	234.2	263.1	324.7	331.8	387.6

Total number of recorded family violence reports in Victoria
	2009–2010	2010–2011	2011–2012	2012–2013	2013–2014	2015-2016
Family Incidents	35,681	40,778	49,945	60,550	65,393	78,012
Where Charges Laid	9,387	12,085	18,007	25,745	29,403	
Where Children Present	12,690	14,458	18,128	18,859	22,445	

=== 2015–2016 Royal Commission into Family Violence ===
In the wake of a series of family violence related deaths in Victoria, most notably the death of 11-year-old Luke Batty, who was killed by his father on 12 February 2014, a Royal Commission into Family Violence was ordered by the government of Victoria.

On 22 February 2015, the Governor of Victoria, Alex Chernov, signed the letters patent appointing former Justice Marcia Neave as Commissioner and Patricia Faulkner and Tony Nicholson as Deputy Commissioners to the Royal Commission into Family Violence.

On 29 March 2016, after 13 months and 25 days of hearings, the Royal Commission provided its report and recommendations to the government. The released report consists of 8 volumes and contains 227 recommendations, directed at improving the foundations of the current system.

==== Future response ====
Royal Commission found a strong foundation for future response, which included

- Family Violence Protection Act
- Seriousness with which Victoria Police now regards family violence
- Victorian Family Violence Risk Assessment and Risk Management Framework
- Development of Risk Assessment and Management Panels to proactively monitor perpetrators
- Dedicated specialist family violence services across the state
- Development of the Indigenous Family Violence 10 Year Plan
- Significant research and legislative and policy reform relevant to sexual assault

==== Identified gaps ====
The Commission found a number of limitations in the current system which included:

- All parts of the domestic violence system were overwhelmed, including police, support services and the courts.
- Not all of the family violence forms were recognised by the emergency services.
- Victoria Police and Department of Human Services are not taking into consideration circumstances of the victims in the diverse community
- A lack of resources for children or young people who were exposed to or suffered from family violence
- The lack of training to recognise family violence by workers in health services, schools and other similar systems.
- Inadequate efforts to hold perpetrators to account for their actions.
- Inadequate methods for sharing information between agencies.
- Little effort to prevent the occurrence of family violence.
- Little effort to help victims recover from family violence.
- The Victorian Government does not have a management plan to respond to the phenomena or to prevent it in the first place.

=== Victoria Police ===
In response to the recommendations of the Victoria Police Violence Against Women Review, in August 2004, Victoria Police developed a Code of Practice which has since suffered a number of revisions in accordance with modified legislation, new procedures or change of the policing environment. Currently, Victoria Police has compulsory action for any reported family violence incident and must act in all circumstances.

Victoria Police regards family violence as extremely serious and has a pro-charge code of practice. The organisation sees the nature of violence in family relationships as particularly insidious because it is an abuse of trust. There is often a continuing threat to the victim's safety or to their life, or the lives of their children and sometimes to extended family members.

Police may receive reports of family violence direct from the affected family member or members of their family, including children, or from a friend, neighbour, members of the public, anonymous person or from another agency. The report may be made by telephone, in person at a police station or by any other means. Police may also detect family violence in the course of their normal duties.

Since the Code of Practice has been drafted, police must respond as a priority (unless it is clear that the report relates to a past incident and there is no risk of imminent danger or the person is seeking advice only) and take action on any family violence incident reported to them, regardless of who made the report or how it was made. The action taken is based on risk assessment and risk management, regardless of whether the affected family member makes a verbal complaint or written statement.

In 2011, Victoria Police launched its enhanced Family Violence Service Delivery Model and established specialist family violence teams across the state, mostly in high-demand locations.

In 2015, Victoria Police established a Family Violence Command as a central point for family violence within Victoria Police. It is the first police force in Australia to do so.

==== Victoria Police's new powers ====
The Victorian government, in a bid to tackle family violence, gave police officers new powers, such as: holding powers, non-criminal options if there is not enough evidence to charge the respondent, seizure of firearms and other weapons, entry to premises and search of persons.

==== Mandatory action by Victoria Police ====
The new Code of Practice set out new mandatory action by Victorian Police officers responding to family violence:

- Take immediate action to protect and support the affected family members and their children
- Undertake a family violence risk assessment
- Recognition of the victim's own assessment of their level of fear
- Identify who is the primary aggressor, and where physical violence has occurred
- Assess if it is likely that someone has been acting in self-defence
- Assess the likelihood of future risk
- Make referrals for every party involved
- Arrange accommodation

== Western Australia ==
In 2004, the Government of Western Australia through the Department for Community Development, issued its first strategic plan to tackle Domestic Violence, entitled "Family and Domestic Violence State Plan 2004- 2008". The 2004 - 2008 plan formed the base upon which the government and all the other agencies involved built their domestic violence strategy.

In June 2008, a Consultation Paper released by the Law Reform Commission of Western Australia, noticed that at the Joondalup family violence court, where a police specialist unit was set up, the number of family violence calls increased. This suggested that the program was successful. Although there were shortfalls within the program, it was seen as a better alternative to the existing system. It was also suggested that Western Australia Police fund and appoint specialist prosecutors to deal with family violence matters in court.

In the first edition of "Family and domestic violence" released by the Supreme Court of Western Australia in 2009, it was noted that Aboriginal and Torres Strait Islanders prefer the term of family violence over domestic violence.

Aboriginal and Torres Strait Islander peoples generally prefer the term “family violence”. This concept describes a matrix of harmful, violent and aggressive behaviours and is considered to be more reflective of an Indigenous world view of community and family healing … the use of this term should not obscure the fact that Indigenous women and children bear the brunt of family violence.

In June 2009, after hearing 22 submissions and consulting with 96 specialists both locally and internationally, the final report of Law Reform Commission of Western Australia, issued 65 recommendations in relation to family violence.

Between 2008 and 2009, there were 30,933 recorded incidents of family and domestic violence and the WA government released the Strategic Plan for Family and Domestic Violence 2009—2013 which was based on the 2004 - 2008 plan.

In 2013, the Government of Western Australia issued a Domestic Violence prevention strategy to 2022, which, identifies 3 broad "Primary State Outcomes to 2022" and was based on the Western Australia's Strategic Plan for Family and Domestic Violence 2009 - 2013. The Strategy Plan, will monitor the outcome of its plan in 3 different stages, however, it fails to state how it proposes to achieve the outcome in the first place.

In 2014, the WA Department of Health released a guideline for family violence aimed at unifying the procedures of health professionals when dealing with victims or potential victims of family violence.

=== Western Australia Police powers and obligations ===
Mandatory actions

- Investigation of suspected family and domestic violence
- Mandatory Scene Attendance

Powers in relation to family and domestic violence

- Entry and search of premises if family and domestic violence suspected
- Issue on the spot restraining orders.
- Submission of Incident Reports
- Seizure of firearms
- Detention of respondent during telephone hearing or while police order is being made
- Conduct hearings for applicants

== Advocacy and support organisations ==
- Our Watch (national)
- Women's Domestic Violence Court Assistance Scheme, Sydney
- Zahra Foundation Australia
