= Australia's National Research Organisation for Women's Safety =

Independent research organisation

Australia's National Research Organisation for Women's Safety (ANROWS) is an independent, not-for-profit Australian company that aims to help to reduce violence against women and children. Its members are all nine governments of Australia (federal, state, and territory). It is responsible for increasing the evidence base of what reduces family violence and supporting people and organisations that contribute to this. It produces a research framework called the Australian National Research Agenda (ANRA).

== History ==
Australia's National Research Organisation for Women's Safety (ANROWS) was established on 12 February 2013 by the Commonwealth Government along with all state and territory governments of Australia following the first National Plan to Reduce Violence against Women and their Children 2010–2022 (known as the National Plan). It continues to operate under the National Plan to End Violence against Women and Children 2022–2032.

== Functions ==
The main function of ANROWS is to grow the evidence base of which measures help to reduce or end violence against women and children in Australia. This is stated as "the promotion of the prevention or control of human behaviour that is harmful or abusive to human beings, specifically the reduction of violence against women and their children".

It also aims to lead national discussion on the topic, set the national research agenda, and disseminate and promote knowledge based on the research, which in turn drives refinements in policy design and practical implementation.

== Governance ==
ANROWS is a company limited by guarantee, established under the Corporations Act 2001, and is registered as a harm prevention charity under the Australian Charities and Not-for-profits Commission. It is governed by a board of directors (maximum 10) and operates under a constitution. Sam Mostyn AO was appointed as chair on 3 March 2022, with her term set to end on 2 March 2026. Mostyn takes office as the Governor-General of Australia on 1 July 2024.

Tessa Boyd-Caine, who was inaugural CEO of Health Justice Australia from 2016, and before that head of ACOSS, was appointed CEO of ANROWS from February 2024, following the vacating of the position by Padma Raman PSM (who was appointed executive director of the Office for Women in September 2023) and the temporary stint as Acting CEO by Jane Lloyd.

Its membership comprises all nine governments of Australia: Commonwealth (federal), along with the governments of the states of New South Wales, Queensland, South Australia, Tasmania, Victoria, and Western Australia; and the territories, Northern Territory and Australian Capital Territory.

== Location ==
ANROWS office is at 90 Bourke Road, in the Sydney suburb of Alexandria.

== Publications ==
ANROWS produces a national research framework called the Australian National Research Agenda (ANRA). The first ANRA was endorsed by all Australian governments and released on 16 May 2014. As of 2024 the current one, released in November 2023, covers the five years from 2023 to 2028. ANRA identifies the evidence needed to end domestic, family and sexual violence, as well as how it should be produced. It is intended to be used by those also involved in growing the evidence base, including researchers, funding bodies, policymakers, survivor advocates, and social impact organisations.

ANROWS conducts and publishes a National Community Attitudes Survey (NCAS). There is a national report as well as one broken down by state and territory. Among other things, NCAS reports on community attitudes towards violence against women. The 2023 report, which surveyed around 20,000 people aged over 16, still showed widespread misunderstanding of the issue. Among other mistaken beliefs, over 40 per cent of respondents believed that women and men are equally responsible for committing acts of domestic violence, and over 30 per cent believed that many women exaggerated or made up stories of violence when fighting custody battles.

The organisation also publishes other research findings, which are regularly reported by mainstream media, universities, and specialist outlets.

== See also ==
- Domestic violence in Australia
- Our Watch
