= Sam Mostyn =

Governor-General of Australia since 2024

Her Excellency The Honourable Sam Mostyn AC
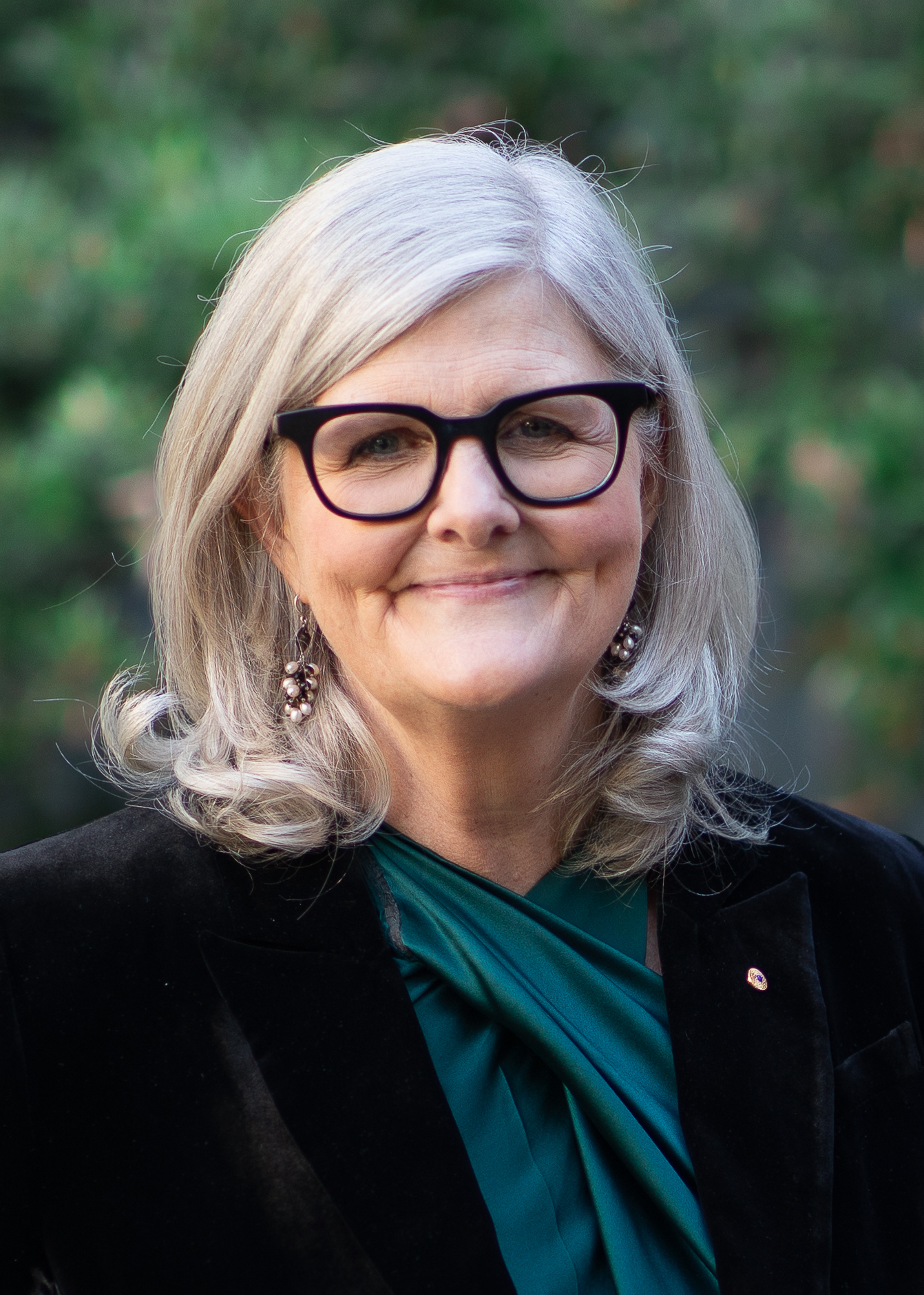
- Official portrait, 2024

28th Governor-General of Australia
- Incumbent
- Assumed office 1 July 2024
- Monarch: Charles III
- Prime Minister: Anthony Albanese
- Preceded by: David Hurley

Personal details
- Born: Samantha Joy Mostyn; 13 September 1965 (age 61) Canberra, Australian Capital Territory, Australia
- Spouse: Simeon Beckett
- Children: 1
- Education: Australian National University (BA, LLB)

Samantha Joy Mostyn (/ˈmɒstən/ MOSS-tən; born 13 September 1965) is an Australian businesswoman and advocate who has served as the 28th governor-general of Australia since 1 July 2024.

Mostyn has been an advocate on climate change and gender equality; she served as the first female Australian Football League commissioner and was president of Chief Executive Women from 2021 to 2022. She was a board member of numerous companies and organisations, including Mirvac, Transurban, GO Foundation, the Climate Council, Virgin Australia, and the Sydney Swans. The Mostyn Medal, for the "best and fairest" AFLW player in the Sydney Swans, is named after her.

== Early life and education ==
Samantha Joy Mostyn was born on 13 September 1965 in Canberra, the eldest of four sisters. One of her sisters has an intellectual disability, so the family was involved in the disability sector. Their father, William "Bill" Mostyn, was a graduate of the Royal Military College, Duntroon, and a colonel who served for almost 40 years in the Australian Army. As a major in the Royal Australian Signal Corps, he served in Headquarters Australian Force Vietnam during the Vietnam War.

Although most of her early years were spent in Canberra, being in the family of a military man meant moving frequently, and included two years of Mostyn living in Adelaide with her grandmother while her father was in Vietnam. She also lived in Melbourne, the United States, and Canada. She played a lot of sport as a child, and loved to watch Australian rules football, although she did not have the opportunity to play. She has recalled attending the ANZAC Dawn Service each year with her family. Mostyn attended Narrabundah College. While earning her arts and law degree at the Australian National University, she worked as a researcher for local chief magistrate Ron Cahill.

== Career ==
Mostyn has held many non-executive roles in business and government, and has also been involved with advocacy organisations and issues that relate to climate change, gender equality, Indigenous reconciliation, and environmental sustainability. Her work has included roles in business strategy, human resources, culture change, risk management, and community engagement.

=== Public sector ===
After leaving university, Mostyn trained as a solicitor while working part-time in the Magistrates Court of New South Wales and later as an associate to Michael Kirby in the New South Wales Court of Appeal. She worked as a solicitor for Freehills and Gilbert + Tobin.

In 1992, Mostyn joined the office of transport and communications minister Bob Collins as a senior policy adviser, specialising in intellectual property and also advising on the introduction of pay television to Australia. She subsequently moved to the office of communications and arts minister Michael Lee, before briefly joining the Seven Network as a broadcast policy manager. In 1995, Mostyn was recruited by prime minister Paul Keating to work in his office as a communications policy adviser. She was also appointed by Keating to the board of the organising committee for the 2000 Summer Olympics in Sydney, where she served until 1996.

In 2022, Mostyn was appointed by the Albanese government as chair of its Women's Economic Equality Taskforce. In 2023, this taskforce recommended that paid parental leave should be extended to a year.

=== Private sector board and other roles ===
Mostyn joined telecommunications company Optus in 1996 after leaving Paul Keating's office. As the company's director of government and corporate affairs, she was named "one of the most powerful women in the information technology industry" in 1998 by the Australian Financial Review. In the same year, Mostyn was recruited to join Cable & Wireless plc in London as global head of human resources.

In 2000, Mostyn returned to Optus as director of human resources and corporate development. She moved to Insurance Australia Group in 2002 as group executive of culture and reputation. She left IAG in 2008.

In 2005, Mostyn was appointed to the AFL Commission as its first female member. She served as a commissioner until 2016 and was a key figure in the development of the Australian Football League's Respect and Responsibility Policy, as well as an advocate for the creation of the AFL Women's competition. From 2017, she directed the Sydney Swans for six seasons. She continues to support the community work done by the GO Foundation, established and run by former footballers Adam Goodes and Michael O'Loughlin.

In 2010, Mostyn was appointed to the board of Transurban. Also that year, she was appointed non-executive director of Citibank Australia, and in 2015 she was appointed chair of Citi Australia's consumer bank. (Note: Citibank Australia was acquired by NAB in 2022.)

In 2021, Mostyn was named by the Australian Financial Review as Australia's "most influential" company director, serving on boards with a combined market capitalisation of over $480 billion. She was president of Chief Executive Women in 2021–2022.

Until her appointment as Governor-General, Mostyn was on the board of property company Mirvac, and chaired the boards of Aware Super, the Centre for Policy Development, ANROWS, and Albert Music Group.

=== Non-profit sector ===
Mostyn was appointed a director of Australia's National Research Organisation for Women's Safety (ANROWS) in April 2018, and was appointed chair on 3 March 2022 until her appointment as Governor-General. ANROWS is an independent, not-for-profit research organisation which was established in 2013 by the Commonwealth and all state and territory governments in a bid to conduct and encourage research that would help to end domestic violence in Australia.

Mostyn has served on the boards of the Global Business & Sustainable Development Commission, the Diversity Council Australia, Reconciliation Australia, the Australia Council for the Arts, Beyond Blue (including as chair), the Foundation of Young Australians, Ausfilm, Australians Investing in Women, Australian Volunteers International, the Sydney Theatre Company, and Carriageworks. She was also National Mental Health Commissioner, and a past president of the Australian Council for International Development. She has also served as faculty on The Prince of Wales's Business & Sustainability Programme, as a non-executive director and sustainability adviser. The role involves leading residential seminars of groups of senior executives.

=== Climate change work ===
Mostyn was one of the Australia 2020 Summit participants. She was a chair of the Climate Council and has written about bushfires and climate change for the Climate Council. She was a member of the Climate Change Authority.

She was an inaugural board member of ClimateWorks Australia (now Climateworks Centre), an independent non-profit research centre focused on climate transition, co-founded in 2009 by the Myer Foundation and Monash University as part of the Monash Sustainable Development Institute. She remained on the board until 2019.

She was also a founding supporter and chair of 1 Million Women, the women's climate action group.

== Governor-General ==
On 3 April 2024, Prime Minister Anthony Albanese announced that King Charles III had approved the appointment of Mostyn as the next governor-general of Australia, succeeding David Hurley, and that she would be sworn in on 1 July 2024. She is the first governor-general to have been born in Canberra.

The announcement was generally welcomed by other politicians, including by the leader of the federal Opposition, Peter Dutton; Mostyn's colleagues; several women's advocacy organisations; the AFL; the Vietnam Veterans Association of Australia; the president of the Law Society of New South Wales; the incumbent governor-general, David Hurley, and others. Commentators such as Sky News Australia host Chris Kenny and former executive director of the libertarian think tank Institute of Public Affairs, John Roskam, politician Pauline Hanson, and conservative lobby group Advance Australia, criticised the appointment owing to her past activism, which included having referred to Australia Day as "Invasion Day" in subsequently-deleted social media posts, support for the Indigenous Voice to Parliament, which was rejected in the 2023 referendum, and expressing support for Australia becoming a republic. ABC journalist Annabel Crabb observed that it was rare for such an appointment "to generate vicious denunciations on day one", arguing against News Corp journalist Janet Albrechtsen's denunciation of the appointment as being gender-based.

She was sworn into office on 1 July 2024.

== Media ==
Mostyn has regularly written for, and been quoted in, the media. She has advocated for prevention of domestic violence and for support of Indigenous Australian women. She was a panellist on the Q+A TV show in March 2021, when audience members asked whether prime minister Scott Morrison's support for women "was genuine", following marches in early 2021. Mostyn commented that recommendations by Kate Jenkins, Sex Discrimination Commissioner, following the national inquiry into workplace sexual harassment, could be implemented and accepted.

Mostyn delivered a speech at the National Press Club, in November 2021, as president of Chief Executive Women, on economic recovery and post-pandemic recovery, describing how Australia can make "the most of its available resources and talent" by investing in care, for paid parental leave, childhood education and superannuation reform, as well as ensuring employees in the care industry, such as teachers, childcare workers and nurses, are receiving well-paid salaries, and respect within the workplace. She described how the pandemic had "left women exhausted and deepened their inequality, particularly in the workplace" and that much of Australia's "luck" had been due to the undervalued work of women.

She has reported on corporate Australia and the gender diversity within the top 300 companies, with 5% of women CEOs in the S&P ASX200 companies. She has also commented on how quotas for gender equity in the workplace work, and how quotas within the AFL have led to improvements in the AFL and the AFLW. She has commented that a large number of woman leaders "sends a message to everybody that women are equal and improves overall culture". She has stated that, when a significant proportion of women are on boards, issues such as domestic violence policy and sexual harassment complaints are brought to attention. She has also written in the Sydney Morning Herald about women and the economy.

She commented that the election in 2022 would be a gendered issue, signing an open letter saying that widespread reform is needed to assist the return to the workplace for Australian women.

== Honours ==
Viceregal styles of Sam Mostyn (2024–present)
- Reference style: Her Excellency the Honourable
- Spoken style: Your Excellency

=== National orders ===
- 25 January 2021: Officer of the Order of Australia (AO), For distinguished service to business and sustainability, and to the community, through seminal contributions to a range of organisations, and to women.
- 10 June 2024: Companion of the Order of Australia (AC), For eminent service in the social justice, gender equity, sporting, cultural and business sectors, to reconciliation, and to environmental sustainability.
- (United Kingdom) 23 January 2025: Dame of Justice of the Order of St John

=== Honorary degrees ===
- (Australia) 2018: Honorary doctorate of laws (LLD) from the Australian National University, awarded for "exceptional contributions to public service or to the practice of law that is recognised nationally or internationally"

=== Honorary appointments ===
- (Australia) 2024: Colonel-in-Chief of the Royal Australian Army Medical Corps
- (Australia) 2024: Colonel of the Regiment of the Royal Australian Regiment
- 2025: Chief Scout of Scouts Australia
- (United Kingdom) 2025–present: Prior of the Order of St John

=== Other recognition ===
- 2015: Mostyn Medal, for "best and fairest" women in AFL Sydney, named after her
- 2019: Winner, IGCC 2019 Climate Awards
- 2020: United Nations Day Honour award, awarded by the United Nations Association of Australia (NSW) to those who have made a "significant contribution to the aims and objectives of the UN"
- 2023: Edna Ryan award: "Grand Stirrer"
- 2024: National Winner - Australian Awards for Excellence in Women's Leadership

== Personal life ==
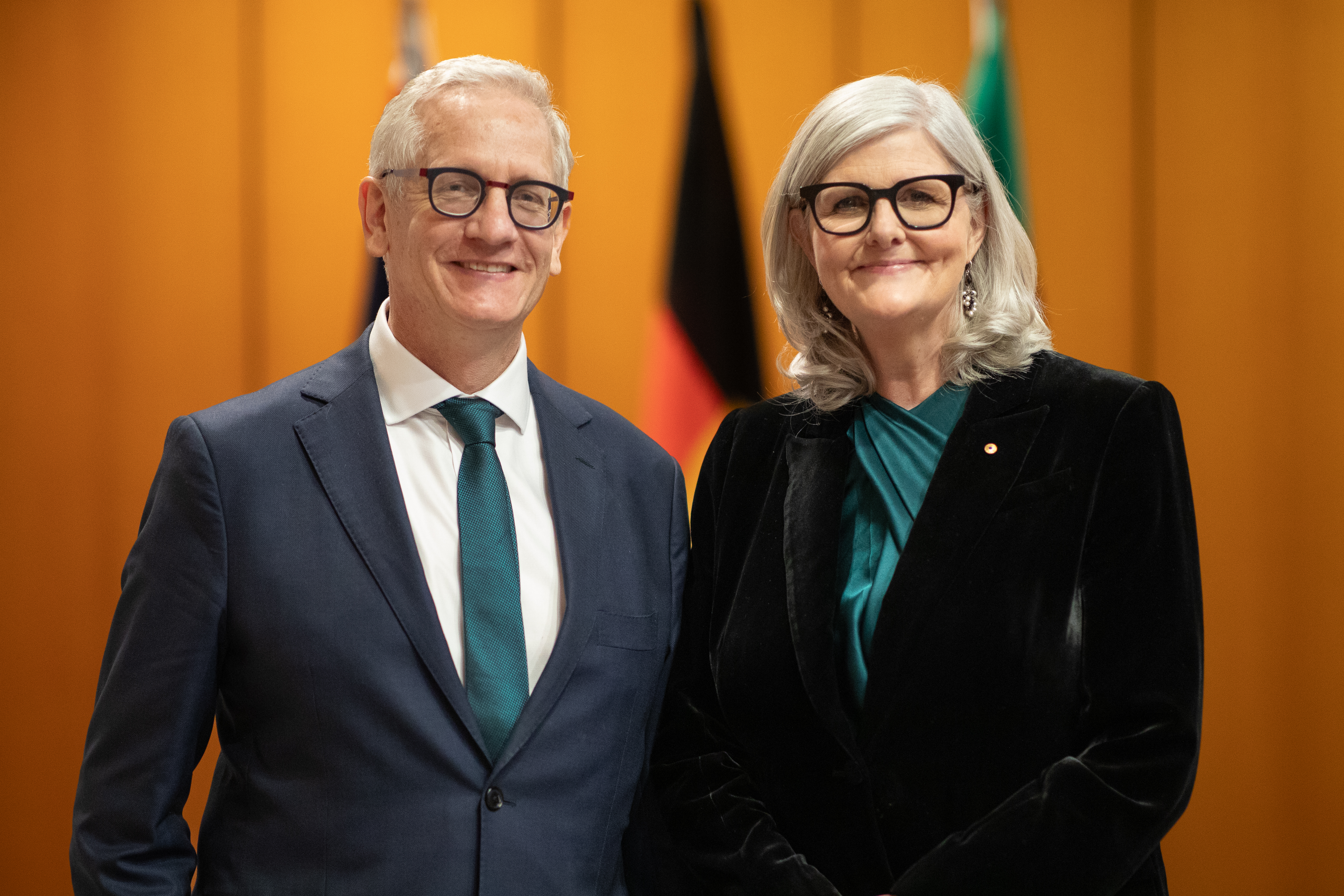
Mostyn and her husband Simeon Beckett in 2024

Mostyn is married to barrister Simeon Beckett of Maurice Byers Chambers in Sydney, and has one daughter.

== Footnotes ==
Government offices
Preceded by David Hurley	Governor-General of Australia; 2024–present	Incumbent
