= Khadija Gbla =

Australian anti-FGM advocate

- Born: 1988 (age 37–38); Sierra Leone
- Citizenship: Australia
- Organization: NO FGM Australia
- Known for: Feminism and Human Rights Activism

Khadija Gbla (born c. 1988) is an Australian feminist and human rights activist. She works as a cultural consultant, a keynote speaker and an anti- female genital mutilation (FGM) campaigner, based in South Australia. She founded the advocacy organisation No FGM Australia, which works to stamp out the practice.

== Personal life ==
Gbla was born in Sierra Leone around 1988. When she was three years old, in 1991 her family moved to the Gambia and later to Australia, for safety reasons, where they were granted refugee status in 2001, when Gbla was 13 years old.

Female genital mutilation (FGM) was performed on Gbla by an old woman in the Gambia when she was nine, removing her clitoris and labia minora. She did not understand it at the time. The FGM was performed with a rusty knife on the unsterile floor of a hut, in the name of "purity". It left her with scarring complications, chronic pain and stress. It was only after arriving in Australia, aged 13, that Gbla realised that what happened to her was "not okay".

Gbla uses she/they pronouns. She is a single mother, non-binary, queer, and neurodivergent.

== Career ==
Gbla volunteered for a charity in South Australia called Women's Health Statewide, which is when she realised that she was a victim of FGM. She helped educate doctors, police officers and the community about FGM and continues to work to abolish FGM in Australia. She founded the charity No FGM Australia to provide healthcare and educational support for women and girls. It provides cultural competency training for medical professionals and social workers.

Working as a peer educator for the charity, she helps others to understand what FGM is, where it happens and the cultural beliefs that surround it. She has advised the South Australian Government Minister's Youth Council on organising camps and activities for newly-arrived refugees and has raised awareness about sexual and mental health issues among her peers. She represented Australia in the international arena at the Harvard National Model United Nations and the Commonwealth Youth Forum of Australian and Africa Dialogue, and she speaks at many events.

Gbla has said "FGM impacts you at every stage of your life; every woman has her own shame and isolation in her experience. I want people to know how terrible this is, what a violation of women and girl rights. There is so much education that needs to be done. It’s up to us to end this human rights violation."

The Khadija Gbla Cultural consultancy offers cultural awareness training and facilitation to government agencies, for non-profit organisations and individuals, as well as advocacy and mentoring. She has spoken at multiple TEDx events.

Gbla is an ambassador for Our Watch, an organisation established to change attitudes of violence towards women and their children, and director of Reacher's Philanthropy - Committed to Women's and Girl's Self Empowerment.

== Recognition ==
Her work has been honoured many times:

- 2024 SA Award (The Australian Award for Excellence in Women's Leadership) Winner
- 2016 The Australian Women's Weekly and Qantas Women of the Future finalist
- 2014 The Advertiser's 50 most influential Women
- 2013 Madison Magazine Australia's top 100 inspiring women
- 2013 Amnesty International Human Rights Activists to watch out for in 2013
- 2011 State finalist, Young Australian of the Year
