= Clare's Law =

Domestic violence disclosure scheme

Clare's Law, often known officially as a Domestic Violence Disclosure Scheme or similar, designates several ways for police officers to disclose a person's history of abusive behaviour to those who may be at risk from such behaviour. It is intended to reduce intimate partner violence. Clare's Law is named after Clare Wood, a woman murdered in England by a former domestic partner who police knew to be dangerous.

Clare's Law has two main elements: a 'right to ask', which allows members of the public, including a domestic partner, to request information from the police about a potential abuser; and a 'right to know', which, in certain circumstances, permits police to disclose such information to the public on their own initiative.

First implemented in England and Wales in 2014, the policy structure has since been adopted or proposed in various forms elsewhere in the United Kingdom as well as in Australia and Canada. Despite its name, Clare's Law need not—and often does not—take the form of a statute. Instead, it may be implemented as a policy document or guidance issued by a government authority to police departments. (Note: Accordingly, as used in this article, 'Clare's Law' has a specific policy structure, not a specific statute, regulation, or policy in any particular jurisdiction.)

== History and nomenclature ==
Clare's Law is named after Clare Wood, a 36 year old mother originally from Batley, who was living in Salford in 2009 to be closer to her daughter, Madeleine, who was 10 at the time of Wood's murder. Wood was divorced from Madeleine's father, and had met her murderer and ex-boyfriend, 40 year old George Appleton, on Facebook. Appleton had a violent criminal history which Wood was initially unaware of, and later Wood was under the impression that Appleton's convictions had been for moving violations. Appleton and Wood dated for several months before Wood ended their relationship in October 2008 over Appleton's coercive behavior and infidelity. After Wood ended their relationship, Appleton continued his abusive behavior with escalating violence. In the months leading up to her murder, Wood filed several police reports against Appleton for behaviors including harassment, criminal damage, threats to kill, and sexual assault. Shortly before her death, Appleton had been arrested for breaking down Wood's front door and attempting to rape her. On 2 February 2009, emergency services found Wood's body in her residence. Wood had been strangled and set on fire. After the discovery of Wood's body, police began searching for Appleton, whose body was found 6 days later hanging in an abandoned pub, later determined to be suicide.

Appleton had seriously abused women in the past and the Greater Manchester Police (GMP) were aware of his violent history. A loophole in the Data Protection Act allowed domestic offenders to keep their prior criminal records confidential. Appleton had served three prison sentences before his relationship with Wood: six months for failure to comply with a restraining order; two years for harassment; and six years 'for holding a woman at knife-point for 12 hours'. Following her death, Wood's family stated that she would not have entered into a relationship with Appleton had she known of his violent past.

In a report on Wood's case, the Independent Police Complaints Commission noted that there had been 'individual failings by officers who demonstrated in some cases a shocking lack of understanding about the nature of domestic violence'. In this connection, one commentator has noted that, given the GMP's failure, it is unclear whether Clare's Law alone would have prevented Wood's murder. Following Wood's death, her father campaigned to create legal means for police to warn potential targets of abuse of their partners' violent pasts.

Historically, police in England and Wales have not responded effectively to domestic abuse. A 2014 report by His Majesty's Inspectorate of Constabulary concluded that:

The overall police response to victims of domestic abuse is not good enough. Unacceptable failings in core policing activities, investigating crime, preventing crime, bringing offenders to justice and keeping victims safe are the principal reasons for this.

In the United Kingdom, the Domestic Violence, Crime and Victims Act 2004 and the 2011 policy document Call to end violence against women and girls (Note: The Cameron–Clegg coalition adopted Call to end violence against women and girls on 5 November 2010.) represent some recent attempts to combat domestic abuse. Additionally, the Crime and Security Act 2010 created two new legal structures—the domestic violence protection notice (DVPN) and domestic violence protection order (DVPO)—intended to protect potential targets of abuse from violence.

== Background ==
=== Intimate partner violence ===
Intimate partner violence contributes to significant gender-based disparities in the distribution of homicides. From 2018–19, (Note: The Office for National Statistics reports crime statistics in the United Kingdom using a year ending in March.) 48 percent of adult female homicide victims in the United Kingdom were killed by a current or former domestic partner. In the same year, 8 percent of adult male victims were killed by an intimate partner. In Canada from 2008–18, female victims constituted 79 percent of deaths due to intimate partner violence. In Australia in 2018, 53 percent of victims of family and domestic violence–related homicide were women.

=== Legal precedents ===
Fitz-Gibbon and Walklate suggest that sex offender registries and related community notification laws, which allow members of the public to be informed if a sex offender lives in their area, resemble Clare's Law in that they involve the disclosure of information about a potential offender to a potential target of abuse or violence. However, they also note that 'sex offender schemes are community focused, while the domestic violence disclosure scheme is individual focused'.

=== Privacy issues ===
Disclosure of information about a person by police raises privacy issues under English common law and Article 8 of the European Convention on Human Rights. (Note: See, e.g., R (T) v Secretary of State for the Home Department [2014] UKSC 35. See also Grace 2015, p. 40.) The Royal Canadian Mounted Police declined to participate in Saskatchewan's version of Clare's Law due to concerns about violating Canadian federal privacy laws.

== Structure and implementation ==
Whether adopted by statute or as a matter of policing policy, Clare's Law has two main elements:

- the 'right to ask', which allows members of the public, including but not limited to a potential target of abuse or violence, to request and (in some cases) receive information from the police regarding another person's history of violence or abusive behaviour, including such person's criminal record; and
- the 'right to know', which allows police to inform a potential target of a threat on their own initiative.

Various Commonwealth jurisdictions have adopted programmes with this basic structure.

=== Australia ===
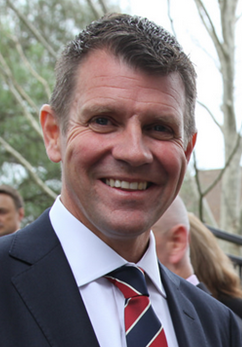
Mike Baird proposed a version of Clare's Law during the 2015 New South Wales state election.

Several Australian states have proposed or implemented versions of Clare's Law.

South Australia launched a 12-month pilot of Clare's Law in October 2018. Such a programme had been considered in the state since at least 2015.

Mike Baird's Liberals promised a version of Clare's Law during the 2015 New South Wales state election. The scheme was adopted in April 2016 and subsequently extended to June 2019.

The Liberal National Party of Queensland promised to implement Clare's Law in the run-up to the 2017 Queensland state election.

=== Canada ===
Versions of Clare's Law have been adopted, or are under consideration, in a number of Canadian provinces. By contrast with the United Kingdom, Canadian jurisdictions have typically adopted Clare's Law by statute.

Saskatchewan, which, as of 2020, had more reported cases of domestic violence per capita than any other province, is the first province in Canada to implement Clare's Law. The province's Interpersonal Violence Disclosure Protocol (Clare's Law) Act received royal assent on 15 May 2019 and came into force on 29 June 2020. Under the Saskatchewan statute, a number of different parties have a 'right to ask', including 'the police, the person at risk, family members, medical professionals and shelter workers, among others'. As of June 2020, the RCMP had stated that it would not honour requests for information made pursuant to Clare's Law in Saskatchewan, as it is bound by federal privacy law.

A version of Clare's Law was passed in the House of Assembly of Newfoundland and Labrador in November 2019. It received royal assent on 6 December 2019. As of June 2020, it had not yet come into force.

Alberta's governing United Conservative Party tabled a version of Clare's Law in October 2019. The law came into force on 1 April 2021.

The Manitoba Progressive Conservative Party spoke in favour of adopting a version of Clare's Law in Manitoba during the 2019 general election.

In April 2021, Ontario New Democratic Party MPP Jennie Stevens introduced a version of Clare's Law under the title Bill 274, Intimate Partner Violence Disclosure Act. Bill 274 was defeated later the same month after Doug Ford's Progressive Conservative government opposed it.

=== United Kingdom ===
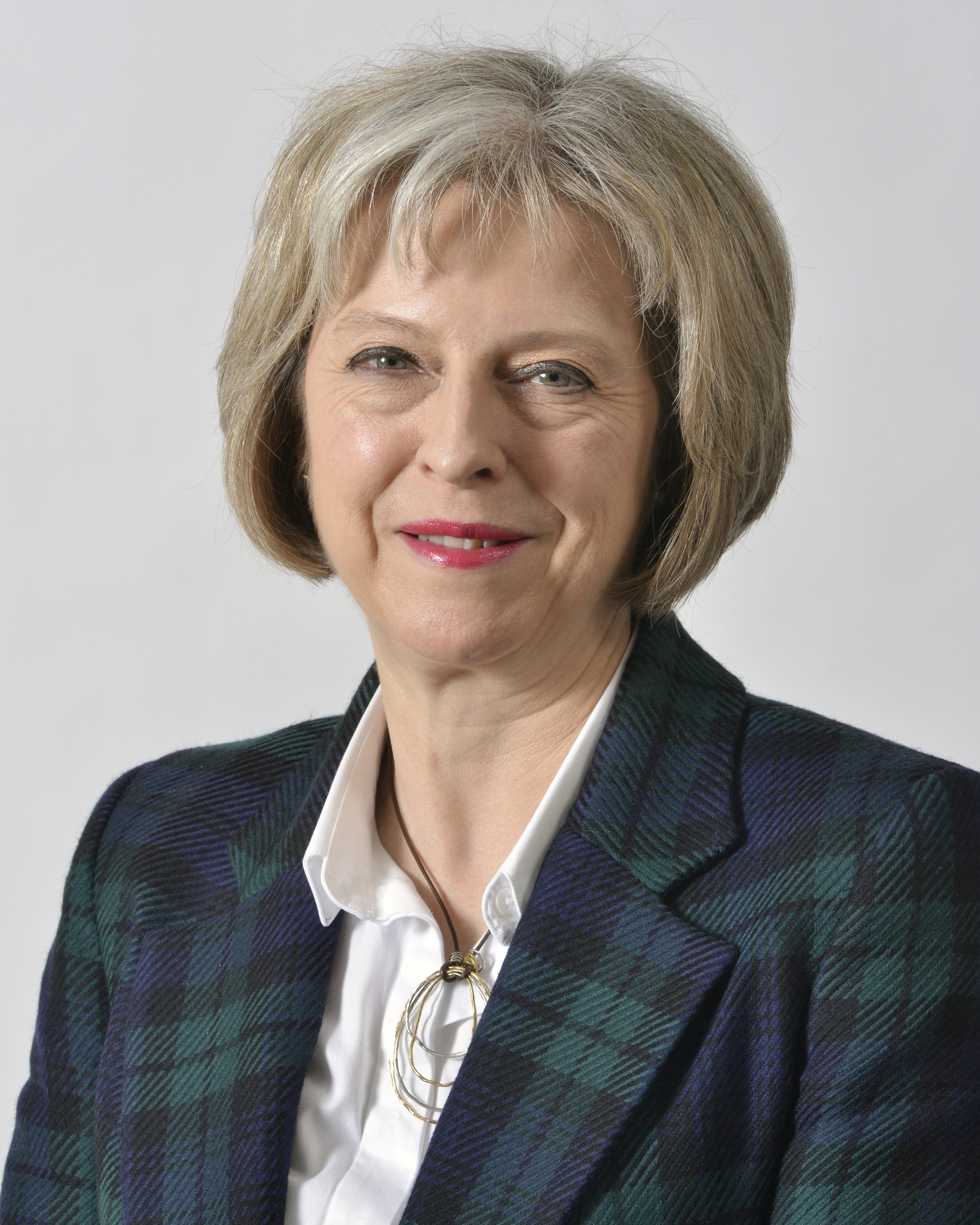
Theresa May, Home Secretary from 2010 to 2016, supervised the roll-out of Clare's Law in England and Wales.

Versions of Clare's Law have been adopted in England and Wales (2014), Scotland (2015), and Northern Ireland (2018). A more limited version for those who care for young people to check if a person has a record for child sexual offences came into force from 2008 as the Child Sex Offender Disclosure Scheme, following pilot use in 2007.

==== England and Wales ====
Clare's Law was adopted on International Women's Day (8 March) 2014 throughout England and Wales, after public consultation beginning in late 2011 and a pilot programme in selected areas. As implemented in the English context, it is not a statute. Rather, it is a policy promulgated by the Home Office—an 'information-sharing mechanism'—known officially as the Domestic Violence Disclosure Scheme (DVDS).

Before DVDS was adopted, police in England and Wales were able to disclose information about potential offenders to the public as a matter of discretion. The Home Office favoured a more regimented scheme, in part to ensure that police disclosure complied with legislation including the Data Protection Act 1998 and Human Rights Act 1998.

DVDS provides guidance to the police in exercising their common law powers to warn the public about a potential threat, in the specific context of domestic abuse. (Note: On such common law powers in the United Kingdom, see R v Chief Constable of North Wales Police, ex p Thorpe [1998] EWCA Civ 486, in which the court, per Lord Woolf MR, held that "[d]isclosure [by the police] should only be made when there is a pressing need for that disclosure.") (Note: On such common law powers in the Canadian context, see Doe v Metropolitan Toronto (Municipality) Commissioners of Police, (1990) 74 OR (2d) 225, 1990 CanLII 6611 (Div Ct), leave to appeal denied 1 OR (3d) 416, 1991 CanLII 7565 (Ont CA), where the Divisional Court of the Ontario Superior Court of Justice held that Toronto police had a duty to warn a victim of rape when they knew she was in danger of attack by a serial rapist.) Courts have held that the exercise of such powers by the police must conform to three criteria: 'relevancy', 'necessity', and 'proportionality'. 'Relevancy' requires police to disclose only pertinent information regarding the person about whom information is sought; 'necessity' requires disclosure only when there is a clear 'social need' for it; and 'proportionality' requires that the person about whom information is sought is informed or otherwise engaged in the process, if possible.

Under DVDS, both 'right to ask' and 'right to know' requests are submitted to a review panel to determine whether the relevant information should be disclosed. In the year ending March 2018, 57 percent of reported 'right to know' requests and 44 percent of reported 'right to ask' requests had resulted in a disclosure.

As the concept of domestic abuse and domestic violence is not straightforwardly mirrored in criminal legislation, in England and Wales, Home Office guidance sets out the range of offences why may be susceptible to disclosure under the scheme, including crimes of violence, sexual violence, crimes of dishonesty, and offences under the Protection from Harassment Act 1997.

==== Scotland ====
The Disclosure Scheme for Domestic Abuse Scotland (DSDAS) was established by Police Scotland in October 2015. DSDAS mirrors DVDS in many respects, including a 'right to ask' and 'power to tell,' allowing third-parties to ask Police Scotland to make disclosures to someone they feel may be at risk of domestic abuse. One significant difference under the Scottish scheme is that disclosures are not currently made about or to ex-partners.

In the first two years of DSDAS’s operation, 2,144 applications were made to Police Scotland. Of these, 927 (43%) resulted in information about abusive behaviour of the person in question being shared. By 2023, Police Scotland figures showed that of the 20,005 requests received, 11,599 disclosures were made informing people “their current partner has a violent or abusive past,” representing a disclosure rate of 58%.

== Effectiveness and reactions ==
It is not clear whether Clare's Law reduces the rate of homicide due to intimate partner violence, or whether disclosures that are made pursuant to Clare's Law induce their recipients to seek further assistance.

Fitz-Gibbon and Walklate note that Clare Wood, in particular, appears to have been 'acutely aware' that Appleton was violent. Thus, they point out, the problem Wood faced may not have been a lack of information, but rather a lack of 'support' from others around her, and a lack of effective police operations in the domestic violence context. Walklate has noted elsewhere that women may not want to know information about their partners' past, or may choose to remain in a relationship despite receiving such information.

Carline and Dehaghani observe that, by effectively deputizing women to remove themselves from abusive relationships, Clare's Law 'responsibilizes' women for dealing with abuse and, accordingly, may divert attention and resources from state-funded support mechanisms.

Refuge has spoken against Clare's Law on several occasions, suggesting that it does not address the root problems associated with intimate partner violence.

== See also ==
- Domestic violence in the United Kingdom
- Domestic violence in Australia
- Jessica's Law
- Megan's Law
- Sarah's Law

== Bibliography ==
- Australian Bureau of Statistics (27 June 2019). Recorded Crime – Victims, Australia, 2018 (Report).
- Burton, Mandy (2015). "Emergency Barring Orders in Domestic Violence Cases: What Can England and Wales Learn from Other European Countries?". Child and Family Law Quarterly. 27 (1): 25–42 – via HeinOnline.
- Carline, Anna; Dehaghani, Roxanna (2018). "Domestic Violence and Abuse". In Lamont, Ruth (ed.). Family Law. Oxford: Oxford University Press. ISBN 9780198749653.
- Duggan, Marian (2018). "Victim hierarchies in the domestic violence disclosure scheme" (PDF). International Review of Victimology. 24 (2): 199–217. doi:10.1177/0269758017749116. ISSN 0269-7580. S2CID 148609032.
- Duggan, Marian (4 June 2020). "Gendering emotional labour: Independent domestic violence advisors". In Phillips, Jake; Westaby, Chalen; Fowler, Andrew; Waters, Jaime (eds.). Emotional Labour in Criminal Justice and Criminology. Abingdon: Routledge. pp. 138–149. doi:10.4324/9780429055669. ISBN 978-0-429-05566-9. S2CID 219052992.
- Fitz-Gibbon, Kate; Walklate, Sandra (2017). "The efficacy of Clare's Law in domestic violence law reform in England and Wales". Criminology & Criminal Justice. 17 (3): 284–300. doi:10.1177/1748895816671383. ISSN 1748-8958. S2CID 151858896.
- Grace, Jamie (2015). "Clare's Law, or the national Domestic Violence Disclosure Scheme: the contested legalities of criminality information sharing" (PDF). The Journal of Criminal Law. 79 (1): 36–45. doi:10.1177/0022018314564732. ISSN 0022-0183. S2CID 145615427.
- Her Majesty's Inspectorate of Constabulary (2014). Everyone's business: Improving the police response to domestic abuse (Report). ISBN 9781782463818.
- Home Office (7 December 2016). Domestic violence disclosure scheme: guidance (Report).
- Independent Police Complaints Commission (February 2010). IPCC Independent Investigation: Greater Manchester Police contact with Clare Wood prior to her death (PDF) (Report). Archived from the original (PDF) on 24 December 2010.
- McMillan, Lesley; Tickell, Andrew (2024). “Lawful, Proportionate and Necessary? A Critical Examination of the Domestic Abuse Disclosure Scheme for Scotland.” Feminists@law. 13(1).
- Office for National Statistics (22 November 2018). Domestic abuse in England and Wales: year ending March 2018 (Report).
- Office for National Statistics (13 February 2020). Homicide in England and Wales: year ending March 2019 (Report).
- Strickland, Pat (26 November 2013). "Clare's law": the Domestic Violence Disclosure Scheme (PDF) (Report). House of Commons Library.
- Statistics Canada (12 December 2019). Family violence in Canada: A statistical profile, 2018 (PDF) (Report).
- Wangmann, Jane (2016). "Has He Been Violent Before?: Domestic Violence Disclosure Schemes". Alternative Law Journal. 41 (4): 230–234. doi:10.1177/1037969X1604100403. ISSN 1037-969X. S2CID 96496342.
