= Clarke family murders =

Australian murder-suicide of ex-partner and three children

- Location: Camp Hill, Queensland, Australia
- Date: 19 February 2020; 6 years ago
- Attack type: Arson, murder–suicide
- Weapons: Petrol, knife (used in suicide)
- Deaths: 5 (including the perpetrator)
- Victims: Hannah Clarke (31); Aaliyah Clarke (6); Laianah Clarke (4); Trey Clarke (3)
- Perpetrator: Rowan Baxter (42)
- Motive: Domestic violence

On 19 February 2020, Rowan Charles Baxter perpetrated a quadruple murder–suicide in Camp Hill, Brisbane, Queensland, Australia. Baxter fatally burned his 31-year-old estranged wife Hannah Ashlie Clarke and their three children, Aaliyah, Laianah and Trey, before dying by suicide at the scene.

The murders sparked a national debate about domestic violence in Australia, after reports emerged that Baxter had a history of violence and alleged misogyny and had been subjected to a domestic violence order (DVO) as well as child custody orders as recently as the month of the murders.

== Background ==
Hannah Clarke (1988–2020) met New Zealand-born Rowan Baxter (1977–2020), eleven years her senior, in 2008 when she was aged 19. Baxter was previously married to another woman, who had also been subject to his controlling behaviours and anger issues. Baxter and Clarke married in Kingscliff, New South Wales, in 2012. They had three children: daughter Aaliyah Anne, 6; daughter Laianah Grace, 4; and son Trey Rowan Charles, 3.

Baxter was a former rugby league player who trialled with the New Zealand Warriors in 2005, before moving to Brisbane as a fitness coach. During his time with the Warriors, it was indicated he had "anger problems" with incidents both when a rugby union player and later as a rugby league player. Baxter and Clarke had been owners of a fitness gymnasium at nearby Capalaba, where she taught children's CrossFit classes. Clarke was a trampolining champion who had represented the state of Queensland and had international medals. The business closed down in late 2019. In November 2019, Baxter became angry that he failed to place in a CrossFit competition but Clarke did, and that she did not withdraw.

Reports emerged after the murders alleging that Baxter had emotionally, physically, sexually and financially abused Clarke during their marriage. This included him causing welts on her arm, hacking her telephone, placing recording devices around her house, and photographing her movements. Baxter also sought to reduce Clarke's contact with her family in Brisbane.

Baxter was subjected to a domestic violence order (DVO) after he allegedly kidnapped their daughter Laianah on Boxing Day 2019. He had rejected his lawyer's advice in mediation and refused to sign a consent order offered by Clarke allowing him 165 days of custody a year. The DVO was varied in the Holland Park Magistrates' Court in January 2020, returning Baxter's full access to his children. The couple then went to mediation, with Baxter refusing to sign the consent order which would lock in custody of the children. He subsequently signed a parenting agreement that gave him the same level of access but was not legally binding. This access was revoked in early February when police charged him with breaching the DVO. Although it is unclear when she began to do so, Clarke legally used her maiden name rather than her married name.

== Attack ==
On Wednesday morning, 19 February 2020, at her residence, Clarke put the children into her car, intending to drive them to school. When she started the car, Baxter suddenly jumped into her passenger seat holding a petrol container, and told her to drive. At 8:30 am in Raven Street, Camp Hill, Baxter doused the interior of the car with petrol, and Clarke pulled over. Baxter then set the petrol alight. Clarke was pulled burning out of the car by bystanders and told them that Baxter had poured petrol on her. While the car was burning with the three children inside, Baxter stopped bystanders from putting out the fire before he stabbed himself to death. Clarke was rushed to the Royal Brisbane Hospital with burns to 97% of her body, and died there that evening.

== Aftermath ==
Clarke and her children were buried on 9 March 2020, with Australian prime minister Scott Morrison and Queensland premier Annastacia Palaszczuk in attendance.

A coronial inquest was held in March 2022, and the findings were delivered on 29 June 2022. It was found that signs were ignored or missed to recognise extreme risks to aggrieved persons, with recommendations including to improve police responses to domestic violence including better training for officers, and funding of respondent behaviour change programmes. An earlier 2022 Women’s Safety and Justice Taskforce report contained 89 recommendations, and precipitated the inquiry into police culture and responses to domestic violence; the coronial inquiry noted these events but made recommendations for more immediate attention. A twelve-month trial of a "multi-disciplinary specialist domestic violence police station" was agreed in principle by the Queensland Police Service and the Department of Justice and Attorney-General.

After the murders it was proposed for coercive control to be a standalone criminal offence. The legislative change was made on 26 May 2025.

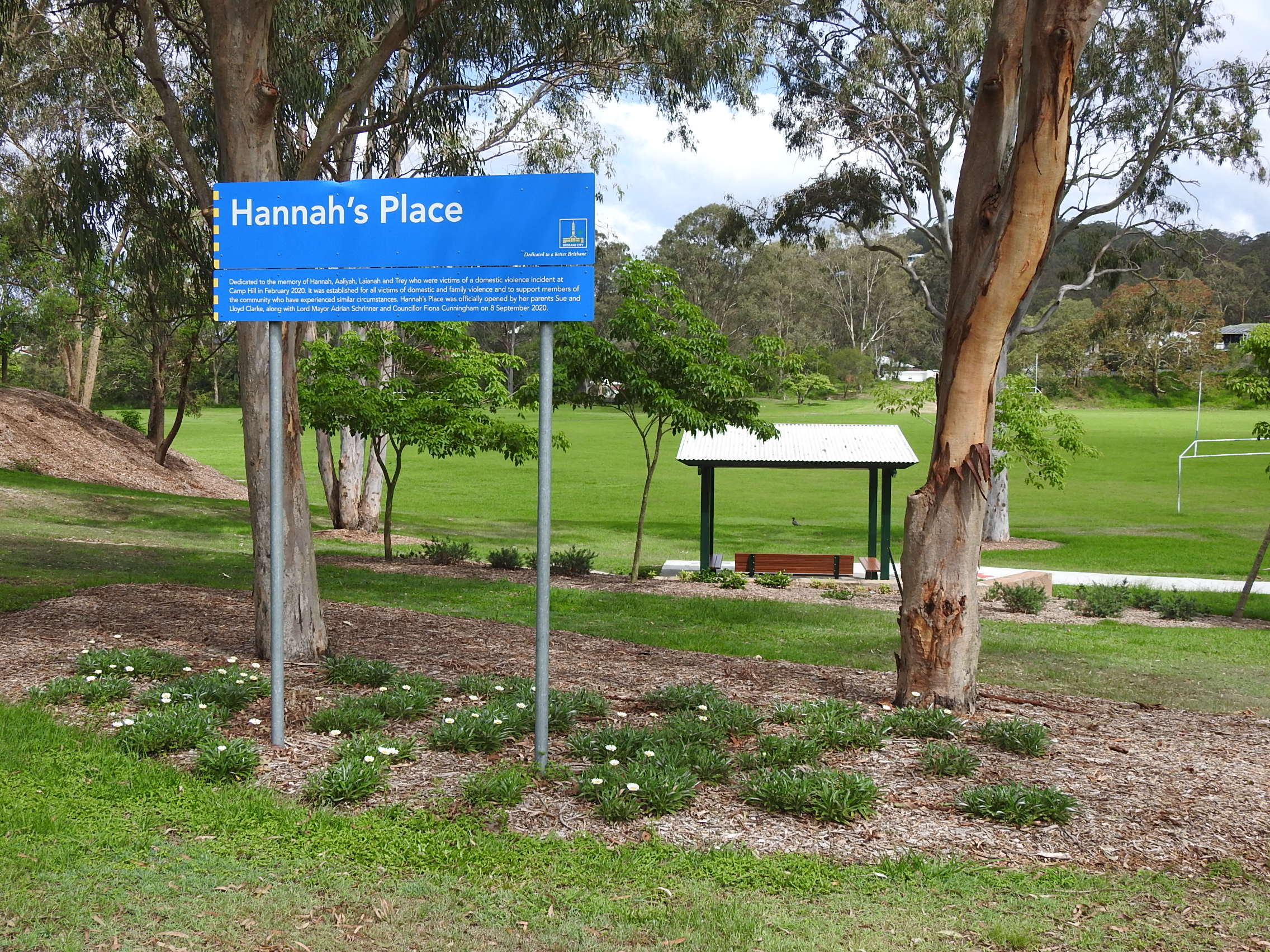
Hannah's Place area of Bill Hewitt Reserve, Camp Hill, south Brisbane (2025)

== Legacy ==
On 23 February 2020, over 1,000 people gathered to celebrate and mourn the family in a public vigil held at the Bill Hewitt Reserve in Camp Hill. A small section of the same reserve was later memorialised as 'Hannah's Place' with a sign, shelter and newly planted trees. On 8 September 2020, 'Hannah's Place' was opened by Coorparoo councillor Fiona Cunningham along with Clarke's family, on what would have been Hannah's 32nd birthday.

In March 2020, Clarke's family established the foundation 'Small Steps 4 Hannah' in honour of the slain children. The charity stated its establishment was to "put a HALT to the incidences and severity of domestic and family violence in Australia".

Clarke was named one of Marie Claire magazine's 'Women of the Year' in their December 2020 issue, for the nationwide awareness brought to the issue of coercive control in Australia.

== See also ==
- Abusive power and control
- Domestic violence in Australia
- Familicide
- Femicide
- Filicide
- Psychological abuse
