= Thinkspot =

Social networking service

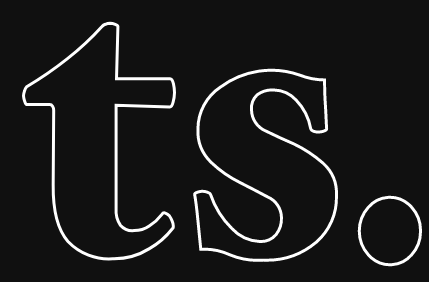
- Website type: Social networking service
- Founder: Jordan Peterson
- Website: thinkspot.com
- Registration: Required
- Current status: Defunct

Thinkspot was an online social networking service started by Jordan Peterson following the banning of several content producers from the membership platform Patreon. Peterson and Dave Rubin conceived of the site together as a platform centered on free speech. It has received mostly negative reviews from media critics and it closed down on September 4, 2025.

== History ==
In December 2018, Carl Benjamin—an anti-feminist YouTuber known as "Sargon of Akkad"—was suspended by the membership platform Patreon, a website on which internet creators can receive money from fans who subscribe to their feed for a regular fee. Benjamin was later banned from the service, which reported that he used "racial and homophobic slurs to degrade another individual". This led Canadian clinical psychologist Jordan Peterson and conservative political commentator Dave Rubin to announce the founding of Thinkspot. Shortly after Benjamin was banned, Peterson announced his intent to create what they called a "free speech platform", hoping it would be launched by Christmas. Prior to leaving Patreon, Peterson was receiving donations of $30,000 a month through the website.

By July 2019, an expected release date of August was announced. By the end of July, a beta test for the site was underway in which users and content creators could access the site. The first small collection of content creators included Dave Rubin, Carl Benjamin, James Altucher, retired U.S. Navy SEAL Jocko Willink and science writer Michael Shermer. On the user side, beta-testers were allowed on the platform in limited numbers, and a wait list was developed to allow additional users. An article by Gizmodo from December 2019, still during the beta phase, estimated that a few thousand users were allowed on the platform.

By May 2021, the platform had not developed a significant following, according to Karim Zidan of the SPLC. On September 4, 2025, the platform announced that it would be closing the site.

== Product details ==
Thinkspot is billed as a "free speech alternative" to Patreon with additional hosting functionality for leader- and user-generated content. Peterson said that the site would only remove content or ban users if required by court, in service of the free-speech goal. To counterbalance the possibility for abuse, he says that a minimum word count on posts should mean that simple trolling is rendered more difficult. In addition, voting on comments is used. Comments that fall below a 20% approval rating are submitted for review to the site's moderators, wherein confirmed "spam" comments are hidden behind a label noting the comment's spam status and "click to view comment" button.

The product allows a wide variety of interaction options, including feeds, forums, comments, a "discourse button", and reference annotations similar to those of the website Genius. Though emoji reactions are part of the website's functionality, an FAQ on the website reports that they "do not allow the use of emojis". Memes and profile pictures are prohibited.

=== Payments and funding ===
Access to Thinkspot is free, while the ability to contribute media requires a subscription fee of $2.50 per month, and the service has different levels of access plans. There exists a lower-tier plan which only allows access to content, while a higher-fee plan allows "contributor" capabilities. In addition, paywalled content exists on the site, such as premium subscription items for individual contributors. For instance, access to Peterson's premium materials cost $240 per year, as of December 2019.

== Reception ==
The site's beta version received largely negative critical reception. John Semley of The Guardian wrote that the website "feels very much like a pay-to-play Jordan Peterson fan site". Brian Feldman of Intelligencer criticized Peterson for the website's mechanic of hiding comments which receive downvotes, calling it "ironic given the professor's stance as a free-speech absolutist". Tom McKay of Gizmodo found the website's design "headache-inducing". McKay reported being charged for subscription immediately despite the displayed message saying that the billing cycle would not start until January 1, 2020. Semley, Matthew Kassel of The Forward, Benjamin Goggin of Business Insider, and Ignacio Martinez of The Daily Dot express concern at the interest by white nationalists and other extremists in the site, noting parallels to other "free speech"-oriented platforms such as Gab that became used almost exclusively by such demographics.
