= Our Watch =

Australian organisation concerned with prevention of family violence

Our Watch, formerly Foundation to Prevent Violence Against Women and their Children, is an Australian organisation that exists to help prevent violence against women and their children. Founded in mid-2013 with Natasha Stott Despoja AO as founding chair, the organisation is based in Melbourne, Victoria. It is an independent non-profit organisation that is jointly funded by all states and territories of Australia.

Since 2015, it has presented Our Watch Awards, administered by the Walkley Foundation, for excellence in reporting on gendered violence. Our Watch runs the website The Line, aimed at educating young people aged 12 to 20 about respectful relationships and behavioural change. It also developed resources for schools, known as the Respectful Relationships program, which has been rolled out in schools across the state of Victoria.

== History and aims ==
Natasha Stott Despoja AO was the founding chair of the organisation, founded as the Foundation to Prevent Violence Against Women and their Children. It was launched in July 2013 by Julie Collins, then Commonwealth Minister for the Status of Women, and Mary Wooldridge, then Minister for Community Services in the Victorian Government, as a joint initiative of the Victorian and Commonwealth Governments. Its primary purpose then was "to raise awareness and engage the community in action to prevent violence against women and their children", and it was established under the "National Plan to Reduce Violence against Women and their Children (2010-2022)". Its role was to provide national leadership in this area, and to drive change in culture, behaviours and power imbalances that cause violence against women.

The Northern Territory Government signed up in 2014, followed in the same year by the Government of South Australia.

In 2015, the "Change the Story" strategy was published, and The Line, a website and social campaign aimed at educating young people aged 12 to 20 about respectful relationships and behavioural change, was launched. Male engagement with The Line increased from 25 per cent in June 2017 to 80 per cent in 2018. Our Watch developed resources for schools and delivered a pilot programme to 19 schools first, and the Royal Commission into Family Violence (established by the Victorian Government in 2015) recommended that the "Respectful Relationships" program be rolled out across all Victorian Government schools from prep to year 12.

In 2015 the Tasmanian Government joined Our Watch, and in their 2019–2022 action plan established a position in collaboration with the organisation, the Our Watch Senior Advisor Tasmania. They have also committed to implementing the Our Watch "Workplace Equality and Respect Standards" across all government departments.

In 2016 the Queensland Government joined Our Watch, with the ACT Government following in the same year.

Fashion retailer Mimco has supported Our Watch since 2016, with all profits from a special collection donated to the organisation. In 2017, Mimco and Our Watch appointed professional surfer Laura Enever as their new ambassador for the following three years.

As of 2017, Mary Barry, was CEO of Our Watch. In that year, the Western Australian Government joined Our Watch.

In 2018, a new element was added to the framework, with the publication of "Changing the picture: preventing violence against Aboriginal and Torres Strait Islander women".

In 2019, the New South Wales Government announced that it would be joining Our Watch.

In 2020, Commonwealth Bank partnered with Our Watch, producing free online resources for employers to help support employees who experienced domestic and family violence. They created a website called Workplace Equality and Respect.

In 2021, the second edition of the "Change the story" framework was released. The revised edition turns the focus onto male perpetrators, not the victims of family violence. It turns the emphasis away from "response and women, to prevention and men", calling for systemic change.

== Description ==
The organisation is based in Melbourne. It describes itself as "a national leader in the primary prevention of violence against women and their children in Australia".

Our Watch is an independent non-profit organisation that is funded by all state and territory governments in Australia.

As well as various projects aimed at primary prevention, Our Watch has also created strategic frameworks to prevent violence against women and children. These are:

- "Change the Story": A shared framework for the primary prevention of violence against women and their children in Australia (updated in 2021)
- "Changing the Picture": A national resource to support the prevention of violence against Aboriginal and Torres Strait Islander women and their children
- "Counting on Change": A guide for policy-makers, researchers, and other stakeholders on measuring population-level progress towards the prevention of violence against women and their children in Australia

=== People ===
Co-founder and inaugural chair Natasha Stott Despoja left the position in July 2021, and was appointed life patron in August 2022. Moo Baulch was appointed to the role in April 2022.

Patty Kinnersly was appointed CEO in 2018, after three years in the role of director, practice leadership.

Ambassadors have included Arman Abrahimzadeh; Ben Brown; Tarang Chawla; Kyle Flanagan; Khadija Gbla; Charlie Pickering; Lucy Turnbull; Tasma Walton; Julia Zemiro; Stella Young; and others.

== Impact ==
As of 2018, Australia was the only country with a national framework to prevent violence against women and their children, which put Our Watch in a unique position.

An independent impact evaluation of Our Watch published by PricewaterhouseCoopers in December 2018 surveyed 251 people across the country. Around 82 per cent of respondents said that they were familiar with the work done by Our Watch, and nearly 75 per cent reported that the "Change the story" framework had influenced their approach to primary prevention. Importantly, Our Watch had created an Australian evidence base, and had established a common language for use when discussing the issue of gendered violence. The report also concluded that Our Watch, through its extensive programs, publications, events and resources delivered to meet its key priorities, that is to build the evidence base; to raise awareness; and to expand the capacity of primary practitioners.

The report concluded that Our Watch had not only achieved its original intended outcomes, but had also brought about very helpful outcomes outside of its original scope. It said that it had fully achieved one of its three five-year organisation-level outcomes, that of evaluating and publicly reporting on all initiatives, and that it had partially met the other two: securing sufficient funding, and achieving recognition by international organisations as a leader in the field. It included nine recommendations to develop its future strategy.

A second independent evaluation was conducted by La Trobe University in 2021. In the executive summary, the report said "Our Watch has and continues to meet the policy outcomes set when it was established", and, although the impact of primary prevention measures are difficult to measure, "Our Watch has achieved extensive influence in the development of the field of primary prevention in Australia and its evaluated programs have shown influence in changing attitudes". The report identified some key successes and areas to focus on in the future.

== Our Watch Awards ==
In 2015 the inaugural Our Watch Awards were given, awarded by the Walkley Foundation and funded by the Australian Government, "to recognise and reward exemplary reporting of violence against women, in particular reporting that highlights the causes of violence and what we as a society can do to ‘stop it before it starts’". Until 2018, several awards were given in up to seven different categories, with an overall Gold Our Watch Award. Since 2019 there has been a single award, known as the Our Watch Award at the Walkley Mid-Year Celebration, which "recognises the work of an individual, team or news organisation in highlighting the drivers of gendered violence and the way these intersect with other forms of discrimination and abuse faced by victims".

Winners of Our Watch Awards include:

- 2015: Jess Hill, Gold Award for two longform articles (published in The Monthly and The Guardian), and two radio documentary programs for ABC Radio National's Background Briefing
- 2016: Lauren Novak and Sheradyn Holderhead from the Sunday Mail and The Advertiser, for their campaign "Knowing what we’re up against" (Gold Award)
- 2017: Gina McColl, for her entry “Gendered violence at work” for The Age (Gold Award)
- 2018: Julia Baird, Hayley Gleeson, Debra Jopson, Sarah Malik and Rocco Fazzari, ABC News Online, "Religion and domestic violence investigation"
- 2019: Sarah Dingle and the Background Briefing team at Radio National, ABC, for "Australia On Trial: Carers who kill, Slavery in the suburbs, Murder on Trial"
- 2020: Nina Funnell for the Let Her Speak series of articles, published in news.com.au, The Mercury and NT News
- 2021: Samantha Maiden of news.com.au, for her coverage of the Brittany Higgins story
- 2022: Bethany Atkinson-Quinton and Madison Griffiths, of Broadwave, for their podcast Tender: Roia Atmar

== Our Watch Fellowships ==
The Our Watch Fellowship Program is also a collaboration with the Walkley Foundation. It provides leadership opportunities for 16 outstanding journalists, delivered in the form of three retreats in 2022.

== See also ==
- Metoo movement
- Rosie Batty
- Timesup
