= Rosie Batty =

Australian domestic violence campaigner (born 1962)

Rosie Batty AO
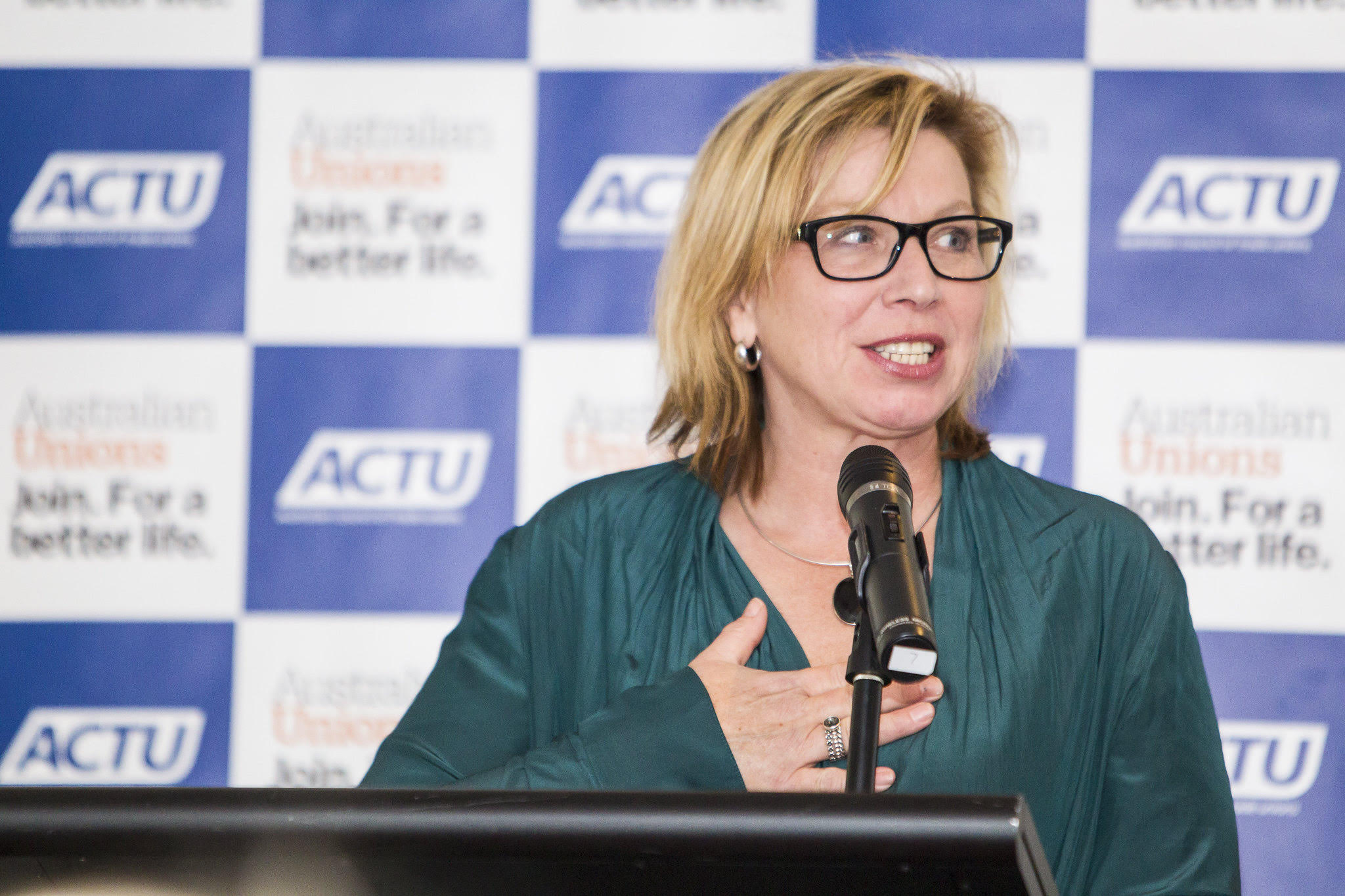
- Batty speaking at the Women's Lunch on Day One of the 2015 ACTU Congress
- Born: Rosemary Anne Batty; 1962 (age 63–64); Laneham, Nottinghamshire, England
- Citizenship: British, Australian
- Known for: Domestic violence campaigner
- Children: Luke Batty (2002–2014)
- Awards: Australian of the Year (2015); Officer of the Order of Australia (AO) (2019)

Rosemary Anne "Rosie" Batty AO (born 1962) is an Australian domestic violence campaigner. She became a campaigner in 2014, after her 11-year-old son Luke Batty was murdered by his father, Greg Anderson.

As a campaigner, she has spoken publicly about her experiences as a survivor of domestic violence to raise public awareness and advocate for social changes. Batty is considered to have had a significant influence on national public attitudes, philanthropy, government initiatives and funding, support services and police and legal procedures related to domestic violence in Australia.

In 2016, then prime minister of Australia Malcolm Turnbull said of domestic violence in Australia that "cultural change requires a great advocate, and Rosie has been able to do that in a way that I think nobody has done before". She was named Australian of the Year in 2015 and appointed an Officer of the Order of Australia in 2019.

== Background ==
Batty was born in England and raised on a farm in Laneham in the English county of Nottinghamshire by her father along with her three brothers.

When Batty was six years old her mother died, and she was raised by nannies and her maternal grandmother. Batty says that her mother's death had a long-term impact: "I have not really formed permanent relations with anybody; I have never been married and neither have my two other brothers. I think it really traumatises you from having key relationships because of that fear that they are going to leave you."

After high school she completed a secretarial course and worked briefly as a bank clerk and as a nanny in Australia.

Batty settled in Australia in 1988 on a partner visa following an initial visit in 1986.

== Personal life and abuse ==
Batty met Anderson in 1992 when they worked together at a recruitment company and the two began a romantic relationship that lasted two years. Batty claimed that Anderson showed signs of sexual violence while they were together and later alleged he attempted to rape a friend of Batty's, after which Batty ended the two-year relationship. Almost eight years later, she reinitiated contact with him and resumed a brief sexual relationship, which led to Batty's pregnancy. She claimed she never planned to have a child, given her lifelong fear of loss, and that her son was an accident.

Their son Luke was born on 20 June 2002.

Batty claimed that Anderson's abuse began shortly after they met and increased when she fell pregnant. Batty has expressed that Anderson was a loving father to Luke and she defended his right to have contact with their son.

In the 2014 coronial inquest into Luke's death it was reported that Anderson may have had an undiagnosed mental illness. He struggled to maintain a job and a place to live and has also been described by those who knew him as unstable, manipulative and aggressive. Soon after Luke was born, Anderson physically assaulted Batty, prompting her to end their relationship, although Anderson remained in contact.

From June 2004 until February 2014, Batty made numerous allegations that Anderson physically assaulted and threatened to kill her, leading to a number of arrests, charges and intervention orders. In November 2012, Anderson was caught accessing child pornography at a public computer in a Melbourne library. In January 2014, Anderson allegedly threatened to kill one of his flatmates, leading to the flatmate seeking an intervention order and Anderson being arrested but released shortly after without charge. Batty was not aware of these events at the time and was not made aware due to privacy laws.

In April 2013, Batty alleged to police that Anderson had wielded a knife at Luke when they were alone inside his car and said "it could all end with this." Batty wanted Anderson to have no contact with Luke. An interim intervention order was made by the court ordering that Anderson could have no further contact with his son, naming both Batty and Luke as protected persons. At a hearing, in July 2013, the interim order was not upheld and Anderson was granted access to Luke in public when he was playing sport.

=== Murder of Luke ===
On 12 February 2014, Anderson murdered eleven year old Luke Batty at cricket practice on a sports oval in the outer Melbourne suburb of Tyabb. Although parents and children were present, as people began to leave and were some distance away, Anderson managed to isolate Luke inside a cricket net, where he struck his son on the head and stabbed him to death. Anderson resisted arrest and threatened ambulance workers with his knife. He later died in hospital from police gunshots and self-inflicted stab wounds.

In the coronial inquest, police officers, child protection services and Rosie Batty stated that they never believed that Anderson would harm Luke, as although he had a record of violence against Batty, he was not violent toward his son.

== Campaign against domestic violence ==
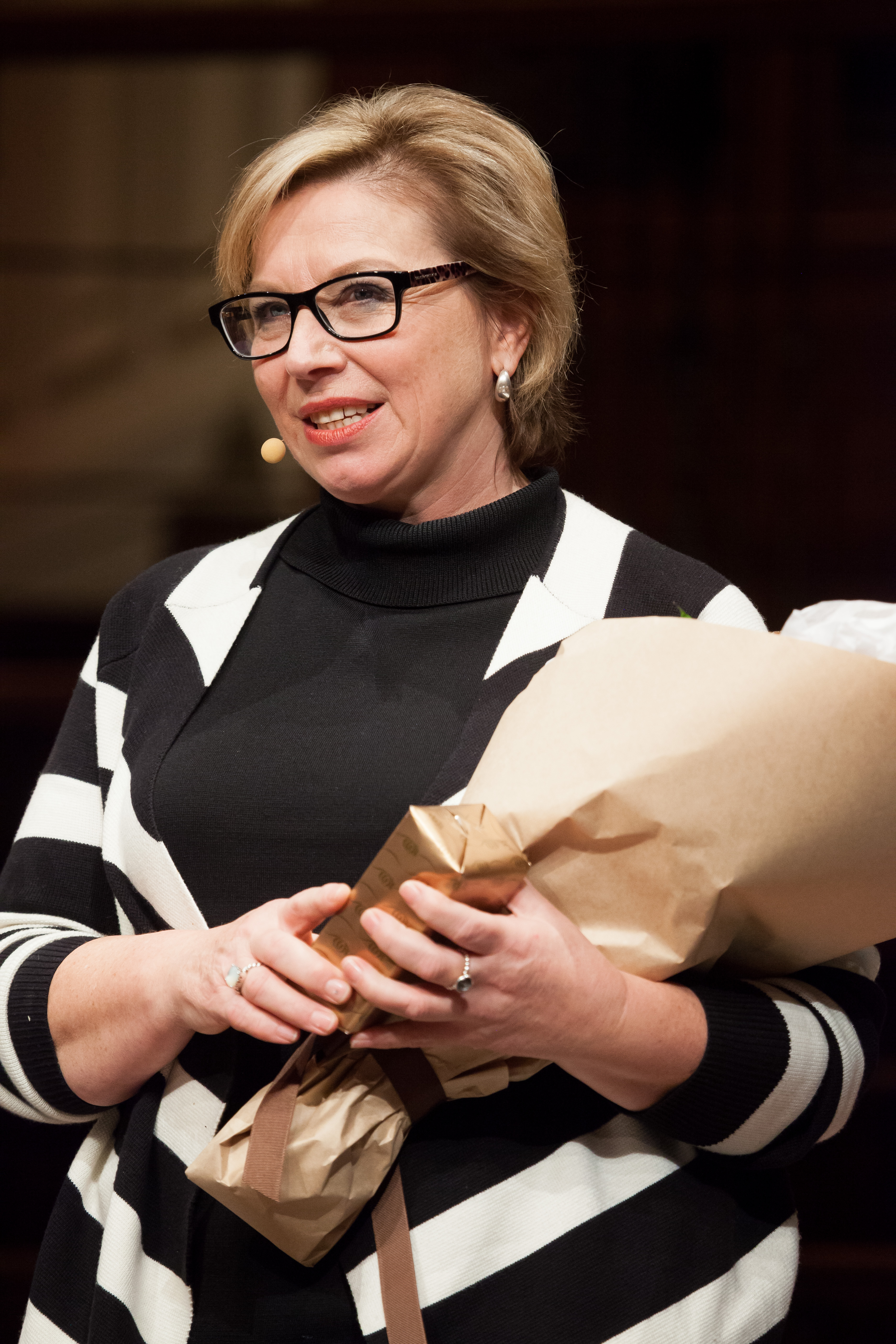
Batty speaking at an Australian Human Rights Commission panel discussion in July 2015.

Batty began speaking publicly about her experience after addressing the media the morning after Luke's murder. She became an advocate for domestic violence survivors and victims, and sought to address perceived systemic failures in responses to domestic violence in Australia. She has spoken about a lack of communication between services, about public perceptions of domestic violence, about a lack of funding, and about police and legal procedures that she felt disempowered her ability to protect herself and her son.

In 2014, Batty established the Luke Batty Foundation to assist women and children affected by domestic violence.

In April 2014, she responded to a comment from journalist Joe Hildebrand on Ten Network's Studio 10, a TV panel show. In discussing proposed Victorian laws for compulsory reporting of child abuse cases, Hildebrand said that being "scared for your own safety, I'm sorry, it is not an excuse." In response, Batty said that she was shocked at the notion, and had thought that after her son's death, she had hoped that "something would come out of this that would actually show the difficulty women have in abusive relationships".

In September 2015 she called on Prime Minister Malcolm Turnbull to close Australian immigration detention facilities due to the incidence of rape and sexual assault.

Batty's story was instrumental in the establishment in 2015 of the Royal Commission into Family Violence in her home state of Victoria. It was tabled in Parliament on 30 March 2016. The report is a culmination of a 13-month inquiry into how to effectively prevent family violence, improve early intervention, support victims, make perpetrators accountable, better coordinate community and government response, and evaluate and measure strategies, frameworks, policies, programs and services. The report includes eight volumes, and is founded on 227 recommendations made by the commission to improve, guide and oversee a long-term reform program that deals with family violence. This includes the establishment of the Family Violence Protection Act, which provides a detailed definition of family violence, the relationships in which it can arise, and a reinforcement of the sound objectives and principles of the Act.

In late 2016, Batty wrote to Federal Immigration Minister Peter Dutton in support of Dr. Chamari Liyanage, who had killed her abusive husband in 2014, claiming that Liyanage should be allowed to remain in Australia after her release from prison, stating that this would "demonstrate a compassionate Australian Government that truly understands the plight of family and domestic violence victims."

On 16 February 2018, Batty announced that she would step down as the chief executive of the Luke Batty Foundation, and eventually shut down the foundation. On the same day, the Foundation stopped receiving donations.

== Recognition ==
Batty was awarded the Pride of Australia's National Courage Medal in 2014, appointed 2015 Australian of the Year, awarded an honorary doctorate by the University of the Sunshine Coast, and was ranked number 33 in the list of the World's Greatest Leaders 2016 by Fortune magazine.

In 2015 she was the subject of a portrait by Jacqui Clark named Meeting Rosie Batty, which was selected for the 2015 Portia Geach Memorial Award. She was inducted onto the Victorian Honour Roll of Women in 2015.

In October 2018 Batty was named in the social enterprise and not-for-profit category of The Australian Financial Review 100 Women of Influence awards.

On 10 June 2019, she was appointed an Officer of the Order of Australia in the general division as part of the Queen's Birthday 2019 Honours recognition for her "distinguished service to the community as a campaigner and advocate for the prevention of family violence".

== Other activities ==
On 10 October 2023, Batty was one of 25 Australians of the Year who signed an open letter supporting the Yes vote in the Indigenous Voice referendum, initiated by psychiatrist Patrick McGorry.

== Bibliography ==
- Batty, Rosie; Corbett, Bryce (21 September 2015). A Mother's Story. HarperCollins Publishers Australia Pty Limited. ISBN 978-1-4607-5055-1.
- Batty, Rosie; Smethurst, Sue (3 April 2024). Hope. HarperCollins Publishers Australia Pty Limited. ISBN 978-1-4607-6029-1.

Awards and achievements
Preceded by Adam Goodes	Australian of the Year; 2015	Succeeded by David Morrison
