= Bruce Lehrmann =

Australian former political staffer

- Born: June 1995 (age 31); College Station, Texas, US
- Education: Australian National University
- Occupations: Lobbyist, political staffer
- Known for: Being accused of rape

Bruce Lehrmann (born June 1995) is an Australian former political staffer, primarily known for his involvement in the 2021 Australian Parliament House sexual misconduct allegations. He grew up in Toowoomba and moved to Canberra in 2013 to begin university studies and to work as a staffer.

Lehrmann was first publicly accused of rape in February 2021 and appeared before the court in November of that year. His criminal trial was aborted in October 2022 after juror misconduct resulted in a mistrial. A retrial did not proceed due to concerns for the health and welfare of the complainant.

In 2023, Lehrmann sued several media outlets for defamation over their reporting of the allegations against him. In a defamation case brought by Lehrmann against Network Ten and Lisa Wilkinson, Justice Michael Lee of the Federal Court of Australia ruled in April 2024 that, on the civil balance of probabilities, Lehrmann had raped a colleague in Parliament House. Lehrmann appealed this verdict. The appeal, heard by the Full Court of the Federal Court in August 2025, centred on claims that Lehrmann was denied procedural fairness and natural justice. On 3 December 2025 the court dismissed Lehrmann's appeal and ordered him to pay costs. On 9 April 2026, the High Court of Australia dismissed an appeal by Lehrmann, bringing his legal avenues to challenge the judgment to an end.

== Early life and education ==
Born in College Station, Texas, in the United States in June 1995, Lehrmann grew up in Toowoomba, Queensland, Australia. He moved to Canberra to study at the Australian National University where he began his political career in 2013. Lehrmann commenced work with the office of the Attorney-General of Australia and worked for various ministries until he joined Linda Reynolds's office in 2018. He has worked as a political staffer for the Liberal Party, and as a lobbyist for British American Tobacco.

== Parliament House rape allegations ==
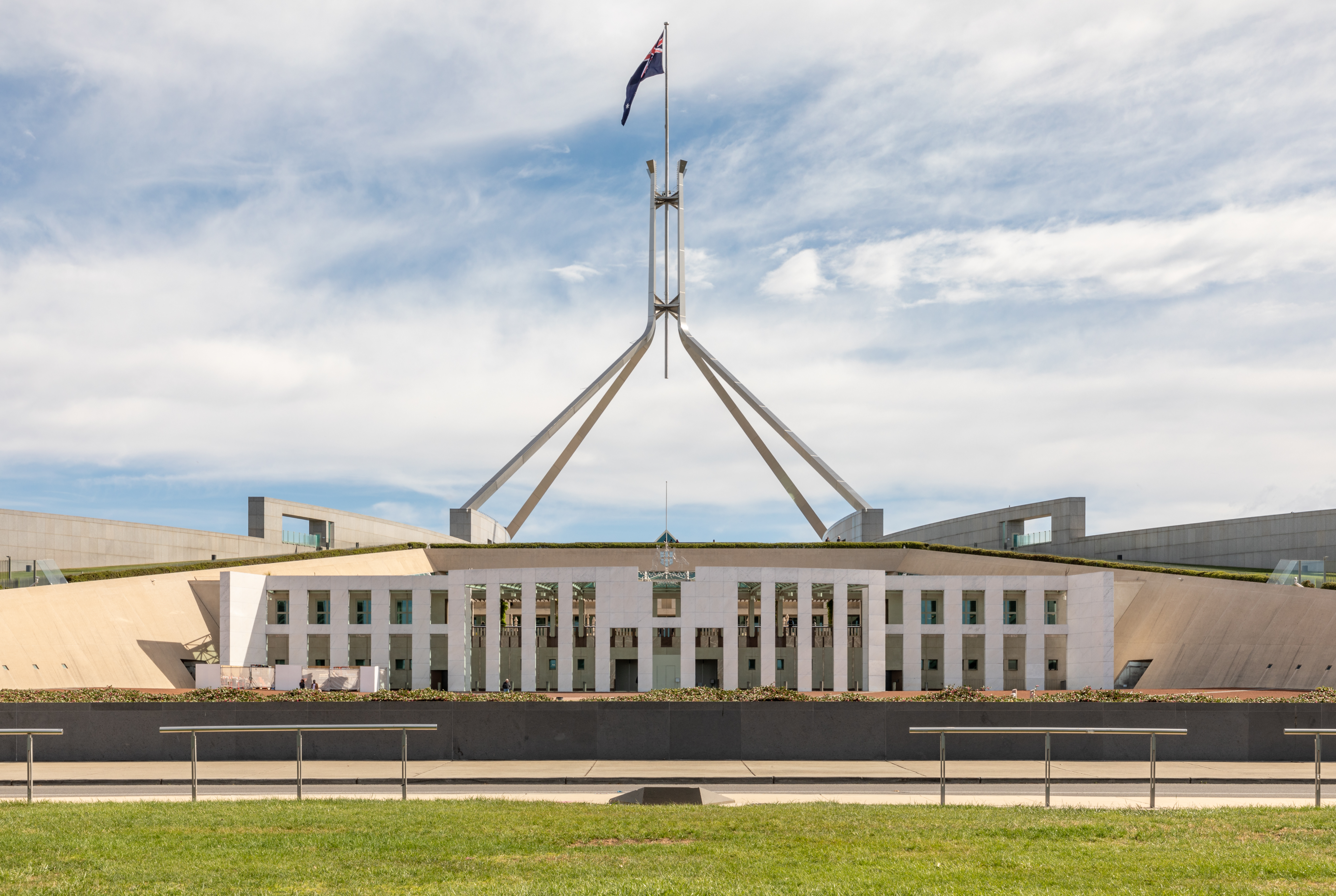
Australian Parliament House, where Lehrmann is alleged to have raped Brittany Higgins

On 15 February 2021, Liberal Party staffer Brittany Higgins alleged to media outlets, news.com.au and The Project, that she was raped in the early hours of 23 March 2019 in then-Defence Industry Minister Senator Linda Reynolds's office in the ministerial wing of Parliament House by a colleague, later named as Bruce Lehrmann, after security guards admitted the pair into the building. Higgins said she became heavily intoxicated at a work party and left with her colleague in a taxi, believing they would both be dropped at their respective homes; instead she said she was taken to Parliament House and raped while slipping in and out of consciousness, waking to find her skirt around her waist. In contrast, Lehrmann told police that he and Higgins returned to Parliament House because he needed to pick up his keys, and as Higgins indicated she also needed to return to the office he offered to share his Uber ride. Once they arrived in Reynolds's suite, Lehrmann said he "turned left towards his desk, while Ms Higgins turned right and went to a different part of the office". Lehrmann said that after working "on a briefing for Parliament's question time", he left the office without seeing Higgins again. Higgins was later found by a security guard in the early hours of the morning in the minister's office, naked, inebriated and disoriented.

Three days later, on 26 March 2019, Lehrmann was told by Fiona Brown, Reynolds's chief of staff, to "collect his belongings from the office and leave" because of his late-night entry into the office at 1:48 am on the previous Saturday, and an earlier unrelated incident of him mishandling a classified document. Reynolds formally terminated Lehrmann's employment on 5 April 2019. On 1 April 2019, Reynolds called Higgins to her office to discuss Higgins's late-night entry into the office, which Reynolds "believed to be a security breach [...] describing the decision of two staff to come into the office at 1:40 am as 'highly unusual' and not appropriate". Higgins went to the police after the alleged rape, but dropped the complaint in April 2019, fearful the report would result in termination of her employment. Eventually Higgins transferred to work for Minister Michaelia Cash for a year, resigning a month before going public with her allegations.

Higgins made her allegations public following a Four Corners report "Inside the Canberra Bubble" in November 2020, which had reported on sexism within the Liberal Party and the Parliament House workplace culture. She alleged political cover-up of the rape ahead of the 2019 Australian federal election, and sparked a nationwide movement of protests. Prime Minister Scott Morrison made a formal apology to her in February 2022. In response to Higgins's allegations, the Australian Human Rights Commission conducted a review into the prevention and handling of bullying, sexual harassment and sexual assault at Commonwealth Parliamentary workplaces. Morrison's loss of the 2022 election, with safe Liberal seats going to female Teal independents, was partially attributed to dissatisfaction with the Liberal government's handling of the rape.

Over the following weeks, three more women alleged they had been sexually harassed or assaulted by Lehrmann, between 2016 and 2020. One woman alleged on 20 February 2021 that she was raped by him in 2020 after the pair had dinner and drinks. On 22 February 2021, a second woman alleged she was sexually assaulted by Lehrmann in 2016. A third woman also accused him of unwanted advances and stroking her thigh under the table at a Canberra bar in 2017. After the story went public, and despite Lehrmann not being named in publications, he was stood aside from his job at a large corporation where he had worked from July 2020. He checked himself into a Sydney hospital and the next day he was in a private rehabilitation clinic.

=== ACT criminal trial ===
On 4 February 2021, Higgins contacted the Australian Federal Police to reopen her complaint against Lehrmann. Following an interview with police on 19 April 2021, Lehrmann was summoned on 6 August 2021 for the alleged rape of Higgins. Lehrmann, appeared by telephone at the Magistrates Court of the Australian Capital Territory (ACT) on 5 November 2021 and pleaded not guilty to raping Higgins. He was committed for trial in the Supreme Court of the Australian Capital Territory.

In April 2022 Lehrmann's defence team applied to have his trial halted indefinitely as an apology from then-prime minister Scott Morrison to Higgins "imputed the accused with guilt of the offence or at least implicitly assumed the truthfulness of the complaint", and could endanger Lehrmann's right to a fair trial. The judge dismissed the application, saying that a jury member being aware of pre-trial publicity "is not of itself problematic". Higgins made a complaint against the Australian Federal Police for unlawfully giving Lehrmann's defence team protected evidence, including counselling notes and video recordings. The trial was further delayed in June 2022 following the judge warning that the line between allegation and a finding of guilt had been "obliterated" in an acceptance speech by Lisa Wilkinson at the Logie Awards of 2022 and in commentary following the speech.

The trial of Lehrmann began on 4 October 2022. It concluded on 19 October, and the jury retired to consider its verdict. After four days' deliberation, the jury could not reach a unanimous verdict and were issued with a "Black direction". On 27 October, the trial was abandoned after it was discovered that a juror had conducted private research and taken their findings into the jury room. Higgins subsequently criticised the criminal justice system on live television, saying it "has long failed to deliver outcomes to victims of sexual assault". Lehrmann's lawyer said "We have brought [Higgins's] comments to the attention of the court and the Australian Federal Police ... as to whether the complainant's statements might amount to a contempt of court or offences against the ACT Criminal Code".

The matter was relisted for 20 February 2023, although a senior barrister soon after said it remained to be seen if the case is retried, given the extent of comments by politicians and media personalities now making Lehrmann virtually untriable. In December 2022 the case was dropped by Shane Drumgold, the Director of Public Prosecutions, stating it was "no longer in the public interest to pursue a prosecution" after receiving evidence "that the ongoing trauma associated with this prosecution presents a significant and unacceptable risk to the life of the complainant". Lehrmann "consistently maintained his innocence and the case against him was not proven", with the Director of Public Prosecutions declaring that "this brings the prosecution to an end." However, the manner in which the case transpired was criticised.

==== ACT trial inquiry ====
Following the collapse of the criminal trial, Drumgold sent a letter to the ACT chief police officer calling for a public inquiry into the case to look at "both political and police conduct". The letter also alleged that police investigators were "clearly aligned with the successful defence of this matter". The Australian Federal Police Association published a statement calling the allegations a "smear" and unproven while also calling for an investigation into the case. The ACT government subsequently announced an independent inquiry into the case.

The inquiry was chaired by Walter Sofronoff. The inquiry heard that police assessed the evidence as insufficient to prosecute, and "expressed a number of concerns about the case". The inquiry subsequently heard that ACT police had been using the wrong legal threshold for charging suspects, and that the ACT had the lowest rate of charging for sexual assault in Australia. The senior investigating officer admitted that police made a mistake in providing Higgins's private counselling notes to Lehrmann's legal team.

The final report was leaked to News Corp journalist Janet Albrechtsen before being submitted to the ACT Chief Minister. It contained adverse findings against Drumgold, who resigned following its release to the media. The review found that it was appropriate to prosecute the matter. Recommendations issued included training police on handling of protected confidential material, disclosures to the defence, and the threshold for charging over sexual offences.

Drumgold successfully challenged the adverse findings against him in the ACT Supreme Court. The Supreme Court found that contact between Sofronoff and Albrechtsen gave rise to an impression of bias. In March 2025, there was a finding by the ACT Integrity Commission that Sofronoff had engaged in "serious corrupt conduct" due to their extensive contact with Albrechtsen.

=== Defamation trial ===
Lehrmann settled defamation proceedings against News Corp and the Australian Broadcasting Corporation (ABC) for $295,000 and $150,000 respectively without admission of liability. The news.com.au article was appended with an editor's note. The ABC removed footage of Brittany Higgins and Grace Tame's National Press Club address.

In 2023, Lehrmann sued Lisa Wilkinson and Network Ten for defamation over the interview with Higgins that aired on The Project in 2021. Lehrmann told the court that Wilkinson destroyed his right to a "fair criminal trial". Lehrmann said in court that he felt isolated and ostracised after Higgins's interview on The Project, and admitted himself to a private hospital suffering emotional distress.

On 15 April 2024, Justice Michael Lee of the Federal Court ruled that, on the balance of probabilities, Lehrmann raped Brittany Higgins at Parliament House in 2019. The finding of fact resulted in the defence of substantial truth being made available to the respondents. During his judgment Lee, in reference to Lehrmann having been through a criminal trial which collapsed, stated "[h]aving escaped the lion's den [he] made the mistake of coming back for his hat." (Note: In the media analysis after the outcome of the defamation case, media lawyer Justin Quill claimed ownership of the phrase. However it has been dated back to at least 1992.)

Further defamation proceedings have been initiated or settled in at least ten other cases amongst parties related to the case. A total of twenty legal threats, claims, counterclaims or investigations have been reported in connection to the alleged rape. In describing the legal proceedings and surrounding media reporting, Lee said "the underlying controversy has become a cause célèbre. Indeed, given its unexpected detours and the collateral damage it has occasioned, it might be more fitting to describe it as an omnishambles".

==== Costs ====
Following Justice Lee's judgment, Network Ten filed a submission seeking costs from Lehrmann. Their submission, prepared by Matt Collins, argued that Lehrmann should bear the network's full legal costs because he had launched the defamation case in bad faith. It stated that Lee had found Lehrmann would have known "that he had raped Ms Higgins" when he initiated proceedings. Ten's submission characterised the case as an abuse of process, arguing Lehrmann sought substantial damages despite knowing the allegations he was suing over were true, and that he had brought the claim on a "deliberately wicked and calculated basis".

On 10 May 2024, Lee ordered Lehrmann to pay almost all of the legal costs for both Network Ten and Lisa Wilkinson on an indemnity basis. In his orders, Lee condemned Lehrmann for initiating the civil case on a "knowingly false premise" and for having his barrister "cross-examine the complainant of sexual assault in two legal proceedings". Lee noted that Lehrmann "had sexual intercourse with Ms Higgins and yet ran a primary case premised upon the fanciful and knowingly false premise" that he was preoccupied with work on the night in question.

==== Appeal ====
Following his loss in the defamation trial, Lehrmann lodged an appeal. At a hearing on 14 October 2024, he sought a stay on the $2 million costs order made against him. Lawyers for Lisa Wilkinson and Network Ten requested $200,000 in security from Lehrmann to cover their legal costs should his appeal be unsuccessful. On 23 October 2024, the Federal Court ruled that Lehrmann's appeal could proceed without him having to pay any security, and a stay was placed on the collection of the costs . In March 2025, Lehrmann's solicitor, Zali Burrows, filed written submissions arguing that Justice Lee had erred in upholding the truth defence put forward by Network Ten and Wilkinson.

The Full Court of the Federal Court heard the appeal over two days, beginning on 20 August 2025. The grounds for Lehrmann's appeal were that he was denied procedural fairness and natural justice in the original trial. Burrows argued in court that "[h]e was taken by surprise as to the nature of the rape … it was pleaded as a violent rape, when His Honour [Justice Lee] found it was a non-violent rape." In response to Burrows's arguments, Justice Craig Colvin expressed that he did not grasp the concept of a non-violent rape, stating: "I'm not sure [Lee] found a non-violent rape, and I'm not sure that's a concept I understand." Justice Michael Wigney noted that, in the original trial, Lehrmann had denied that any sexual activity or rape had occurred, and therefore it would have been illogical to question him about the specific nature of an event he wholly denied. Barrister for Ten, Matt Collins stated that it was a "astonishing submission" that Lehrmann may have given different evidence if a "non-violent rape" was put on him in the original defamation trial.

On 3 December 2025 the Federal Court dismissed Lehrmann's appeal. The court in its judgment went beyond Justice Lee's previous judgment, stating that “only reasonable inference to be drawn from the facts, known and observable to Mr Lehrmann at the time he had sexual intercourse with Ms Higgins, is that Mr Lehrmann did turn his mind to whether Ms Higgins consented to sex, was aware that she was not consenting, but proceeded nonetheless”. The court ordered Lehrmann to pay the defences legal costs. Following the outcome of the appeal, Higgins posted on social media that "Finally, it feels like I can breathe again". She further said "I cannot begin to tell you how re-traumatising it is to have your rapist weaponise the legal system against you for daring to speak out."

Lehrmann filed an appeal to the High Court of Australia in January 2026. In his fillings, Lehrmann alleged that the original trial judge, Justice Lee, had engaged in their own research and was therefore not impartial. He further argued that the Full Court of the Federal Court erred in going beyond Lee's original finding of "non-advertent recklessness" in regards to Higgins's consent. Special leave to appeal was dismissed with costs on 9 April 2026, with the court citing "insufficient proposects of success to warrant a grant of special leave", and the absence of "a question of law that is of public importance". The court's dismissal of his appeal brought his legal avenues for appeal to an end.

== Queensland rape allegations ==
On 26 October 2023, it was revealed that, in December 2022, Lehrmann was charged with two counts of rape in a matter unrelated to the allegations made by Brittany Higgins. The alleged events occurred in Toowoomba in October 2021, when he was awaiting trial for the alleged rape of Higgins. Lehrmann's identity had been the subject of a suppression order, which his lawyers had attempted to continue on the basis of a psychologist's report which claimed the publication of Lehrmann's identity would lead to "serious adverse consequences" to his mental health. Justice Peter Applegarth, in ruling against the continuation of the suppression order, made reference to media interviews that Lehrmann had engaged in, and how his participation in these interviews was hard to reconcile with the psychologist's report.

On 23 January 2025, Lehrmann's defence made an application to the court requesting a judge-only trial. In March 2025, Lehrmann changed the lawyer defending him in the rape trial from Rowan King to Zali Burrows, who has been representing him in his defamation trial appeal. In June 2024, Lehrmann lodged an application for a permanent stay of proceedings, arguing that phone conversations between his former lawyers and Queensland police were illegally intercepted. Lehrmann withdrew claims that police had illegally intercepted phone calls, and the application was dismissed on 25 July 2025.

In November 2025, Judge Craig Chowdhury ruled that the prosecution provide Lehrmann with a full forensic copy of the complainant's phone. The matter was adjourned to 3 December for a mention on the defence's stay application. On 5 December 2025, Judge Dennis Lynch ordered that Lehrmann be provided with an unredacted copy of the alleged victim's phone after Burrows sought to provide it to him. Lynch adjourned the case until February 2026, stating that it needs to proceed due to witness availability. At a hearing in October 2026, the scheduled rape trial was postponed with Burrows telling the court that she had run into trouble trying to find a barrister to represent Lehrmann. The matter is due to be heard again on 2 November 2026.

== Other legal matters ==
=== Rental damages ===
In June 2024, it was alleged in the New South Wales Civil and Administrative Tribunal that Lehrmann had caused $13,250 worth of damage to a rental property that Seven Network was paying for in order for Lehrmann to be interviewed exclusively by their Spotlight program. Lehrmann did not attend this hearing.

=== Corruption agency raid ===
In June 2024, the National Anti-Corruption Commission (NACC) searched Lehrmann's home. The raid was part of an investigation into allegations he improperly took confidential documents about the French submarine program. In September 2025, Lehrmann sued the NACC, alleging that the agency engaged in wrongdoing by raiding his house, with special minister of state Don Farrell also named in the case. He also alleged that he has been denied funding, which had been promised, for representation at a NACC hearing after the raid. Lehrmann and Farrell were ordered into mediation in October 2025.

Lehrmann's request for funding was formally rejected by Farrell on 22 October 2025, after waiting over a year for a decision, Lehrmann subsequently told the Federal Court that he would amend his case, seeking a judicial review. In October 2026, it was reported that the NACC had abandoned their investigation into Lehrmann.

=== Tasmanian car theft charge ===
On 24 February 2025, Lehrmann appeared via telephone at the Magistrates Court of Tasmania on charges of stealing a four-wheel drive at Mountain River, Tasmania. He entered a not guilty plea on 19 June and was ordered to attend court in September. He attended court, by phone on 19 September 2025. During the hearing Burrows told the court that she would be subpoenaing a media interview given by the complainant, comparing it with a statutory declaration and looking for discrepancies. A suspended warrant was issued for Lehrmann after he failed to attend court for a contest mention on 6 November 2025. Burrows told the court that he was not available due to urgent medical issues. Magistrate Robert Webster said that Lehrmann needs to attend a delayed hearing on 4 December and bring a medical certificate or he would be arrested.

Lehrmann plead guilty on 4 December 2025 after the charge against him was downgraded from car theft to driving a car without consent. Lehrmann advised the court that he was partying at a house. His host took his keys from him in an attempt to stop him from driving because he was intoxicated and he had taken a nearby car which had its keys in it. Lehrmann was sentenced to a $100 fine, 12 months good behaviour and spared a conviction due to his previous lack of record.

=== Restraining order application ===
In July 2025, Lerhmann made an application for a restraining order against Daily Mail reporter Karleigh Smith. Lehrmann alleged that Smith had stalked him after the Daily Mail published a story written by her titled "We found the despised party boy hiding at the end of the Earth". Burrows told the court that Smith had "dangerously" followed Lerhmann in a vehicle down a dirt road and that the incident had negatively affected Lehrmann's mental health. In court, Smith argued that there was a journalistic exemption to the legal definition of stalking. The application was dismissed in November 2025, with Smith's lawyer telling Hobart magistrates court that the parties had settled the matter.

=== Failed subpoena of the documentary film Silenced ===
In 2026, Selina Miles released the documentary Silenced, which is about how defamation laws have become weaponised by alleged perpetrators against women for speaking out. The film features international human rights lawyer Jennifer Robinson, Brittany Higgins, Catalina Ruiz-Navarro and Amber Heard. In June 2026, Bruce Lehrmann lost a legal bid to subpoena a copy of the documentary, all raw b-roll and unused footage, and a schedule of the film's distribution from producers. Lehrmann's solicitor, Zali Burrows, argued the film could be prejudicial to potential jurors in Lehrmann's rape trial in Queensland. Judge Richards ruled "there is no legitimate forensic purpose in this subpoena".

== Media appearances ==
In June 2023, Lehrmann gave an interview on Seven News' Spotlight current affairs program. In October 2023, Seven Network's nomination for a Walkley Award was revoked after it was revealed that the network had paid for one year's rent as well as other expenses for Lehrmann, and the network had not accurately declared it. The interview was the subject of much media attention during subsequent defamation proceedings and uncovered revelations about Lehrmann.

Lehrmann was initially due to speak at a Restoring the Presumption of Innocence conference organised by Bettina Arndt in June 2024. Arndt, described as one of Lehrmann's central supporters, has denied raising money for or asking anyone to pay money to Lehrmann. However, Lehrmann withdrew as a speaker a day after the conclusion of his defamation trial, being "concerned that his participation may threaten the audience, jeopardise this important event, and distract from its main purpose".
