= Jennifer Robinson (lawyer) =

Australian human rights lawyer and barrister

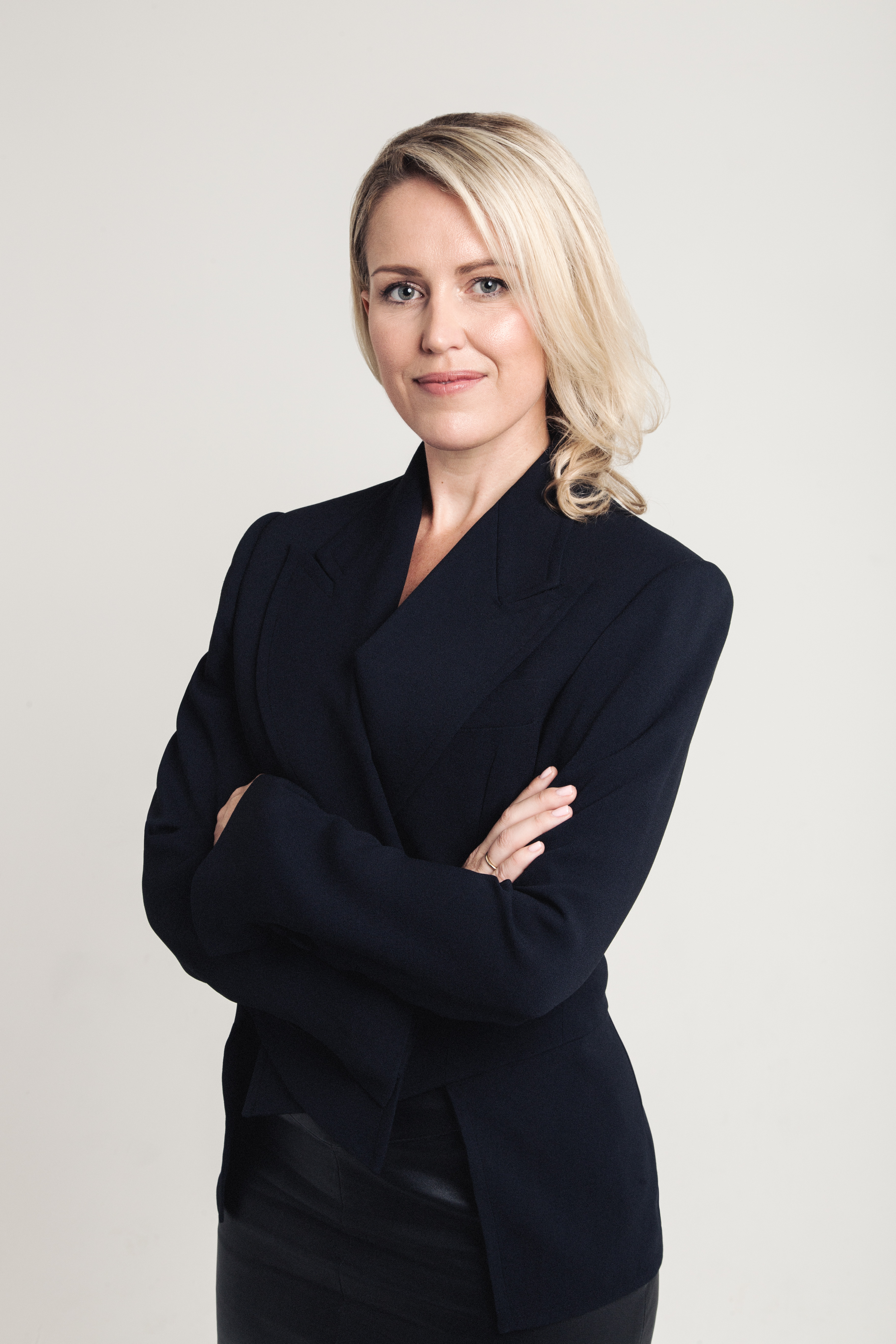
- Robinson in 2018
- Born: Jennifer Robinson; 1981 (age 44–45); Berry, New South Wales, Australia
- Education: Australian National University (BAsianStudies, LLB); Balliol College, Oxford (BCL, MPhil)
- Occupations: Lawyer; Barrister
- Employer: Doughty Street Chambers
- Known for: Julian Assange case (2019–present)
- Awards: University Medal

Jennifer Robinson (born 1981) is an Australian human rights lawyer and barrister with Doughty Street Chambers in London.

Robinson is best known for her role as a long-standing member of the legal team defending Julian Assange and WikiLeaks. She is also known for representing Amber Heard during the defamation proceedings brought by Heard's ex-husband Johnny Depp against The Sun newspaper in the UK. She has also provided legal assistance to activists from West Papua.

== Education ==
Robinson grew up in Berry, New South Wales, and attended Bomaderry High School. She then attended the Australian National University, where she graduated with a double degree in Law and Asian Studies, specialising in international law, Indonesia and South East Asia. She was awarded the University Medal in Law and was a Distinguished Scholar in Asian Studies. During her time as an undergraduate student, she spent one year as an exchange student at Gadjah Mada University in Yogyakarta, Indonesia.

She was a Rhodes Scholar at the University of Oxford, where she attended Balliol College and graduated with a Bachelor of Civil Law with Distinction and a Master of Philosophy in Public International Law.

== Career ==
Robinson was called to the Bar in 2016 and joined Geoffrey Robertson KC's Doughty Street Chambers, having known Robertson since her period at Oxford University in the mid-2000s. They outlined the case for an Australian Bill of Rights, as well as a legal opinion on crimes against humanity in Iran.

From 2009, she worked at the London law firm of Finers Stephens Innocent, where she describes her practice as largely media defence, freedom of information and free speech litigation, acting for clients such as The New York Times, CNN, Associated Press and Bloomberg News. She also provided international human rights advice, including on humanitarian issues in post-conflict Iraq, extraordinary rendition and international criminal law. According to Robinson, she has engaged in strategic free speech litigation before the UK Supreme Court, the European Court of Human Rights. She has challenged obscenity convictions in Indonesia.

With Geoffrey Robertson KC, she acted in the first application before the UK Supreme Court, popularly known as the "alphabet soup" case, where they were successful in overturning reporting restrictions in anti-terrorist asset freezing cases in Mohammed Jabar and Others v HM Treasury [2010] UK SC 1. She also acted in the first application, before the UK Supreme Court intervened on behalf of media defence organisations in the Max Mosley case before the European Court of Human Rights.

She worked with Robertson when he was hired by Richard Dawkins, Christopher Hitchens and Sam Harris in 2009 on establishing the legal case that the Pope and the Vatican were responsible for a crime against humanity, as a result of widespread child sex abuse within the Catholic Church. This case was later submitted to the ICC Prosecutor by the Centre for Constitutional Rights.

According to Robinson, she advised The New York Times during its phone-hacking investigations in London, including its story about the extent of involvement of Andy Coulson, who became the press adviser to the UK Prime Minister, David Cameron.

In May 2013, Robinson spoke at TEDx Sydney. Entitled "Courage is Contagious", her speech informed about human rights issues and the political situation in West Papua through the lens of exiled leader Benny Wenda.

In 2018, Robinson made an oral submission before the International Court of Justice on behalf of Vanuatu in the Legal Consequences of the Separation of the Chagos Archipelago from Mauritius in 1965 Advisory Opinion. She also represented Vanuatu in its successful bid to have the UN General Assembly request an Advisory Opinion from the International Court of Justice on state obligations in respect of climate change, and is acting for Vanuatu in the ongoing proceedings.

More recent cases include acting for the BBC World Service to take action against Iran for the persecution of BBC Persian staff and their families, the first time in BBC history that BBC journalists have appealed to the UN for their protection, and acting with French counsel for a group of NGOs challenging the cross-jurisdictional impact of the right to be forgotten in Google v CNIL before the Conseil d'État and the European Court of Justice.

In 2022, Robinson was a member of the legal team which filed a complaint against Israel to the International Criminal Court on behalf of Palestinian-American journalist Shireen Abu Akleh's family. Abu Akleh was killed and two of her colleagues injured while they were reporting on an Israeli raid in the occupied West Bank.

== Defending WikiLeaks and Assange ==
Robinson began acting as legal counsel to Julian Assange and WikiLeaks in October 2010.

The treatment Robinson has faced as Assange's lawyer has raised the concern of lawyers' rights groups. The United States Department of State released correspondence with Robinson and Assange to the press, which Robinson said resulted in her receiving death threats. Lawyers' Rights Watch Canada issued a statement that it was 'alarmed by actions of US State Department Legal Advisor Harold Hongju Koh that put British barrister Jennifer Robinson in jeopardy and interfere with the right of her client Julian Assange, to be represented.'

In 2022, Robinson reached a friendly settlement with the United Kingdom government after it admitted to violating her privacy and freedom of expression rights in a case brought under the European Convention on Human Rights. The case pertained to the alleged surveillance of Robinson by the UK government in connection to her role as Assange's lawyer.

== Awards and appointments ==
In 2008 she was one of thirty lawyers named by the UK Attorney General as a National Pro Bono Hero. In 2013 she was named the inaugural Young Alumni of the Year by the Australian National University. Robinson is on the executive committee of the Commonwealth Law Association. In 2019, Robinson was joint winner of the International Pro Bono Barrister of the Year award from the UK legal charity, Advocate.

In 2026 Robinson was awarded the Sydney Peace Prize. She was awarded "in recognition of her outstanding global contribution to human rights, justice, and the protection of fundamental freedoms."

== Philanthropy ==
Robinson founded and developed the Bertha Justice Initiative, a programme for the Bertha Foundation which provides training and work opportunities to early-career lawyers in social justice and human rights. The Initiative has trained hundreds of young lawyers in 17 different countries. She also founded the Acacia Award in conjunction with the Public Education Foundation in Australia to support children in need and build a network of public school alumni to mentor public school students.

== Publications ==
In 2021, it was announced that Robinson had signed a three-book deal with Allen & Unwin in Australia. Her first book, How Many More Women?, written with co-author Dr Keina Yoshida, was first published in Australia and New Zealand in 2022, and by Hachette UK in the UK in 2023. The UK paperback edition was published in 2024 under the title Silenced Women: Why The Law Fails Women and How to Fight Back. The work is described by the Australian publisher as an examination 'of the laws around the world that silence women, and explore[s] the changes we need to make to ensure that women's freedoms are no longer threatened by the legal system that is supposed to protect them'.

== Film ==
Jennifer Robinson and Selina Miles at the US-premiere 2026

Silenced by Selina Miles is based on Robinson's book How Many More Women?.

The documentary film follows Robinson as she examines the global weaponisation of defamation laws to quiet sexual assault survivors and journalists. Robinson's work is framed through the personal inspiration of her grandmother, a sexual assault survivor. Filmmaker Selina Miles interviews Amber Heard, Brittany Higgins and Colombian journalist Catalina Ruiz-Navarro, alongside South African human rights lawyer Sibongile Ndashe, UN special rapporteur Irene Khan and journalist Alexi Mostrous. The film examines Depp v. Heard, Depp v News Group Newspapers Ltd and the Australian Parliament House sexual misconduct allegations against Bruce Lehrmann. The film also includes historical cases such as the Clinton–Lewinsky scandal and Stocker v Stocker.

Robinson discussed the documentary's themes on ABC Radio's Overnights, on the ABC podcast Ladies We Need To Talk.
