= Zyzz =

Australian bodybuilder and internet celebrity (1989–2011)

Aziz Shavershian
- Азиз Шавершян
- Shavershian in 2011
- Born: Aziz Sergeyevich Shavershian; 24 March 1989; Moscow, Russian SFSR, Soviet Union
- Died: 5 August 2011 (aged 22); Pattaya, Thailand
- Other names: Zyzz; AZ
- Occupations: Bodybuilder, personal trainer, model, stripper
- Years active: 2007–2011
- Height: 185 cm (6 ft 1 in)

Aziz Sergeyevich Shavershian (Note: Russian: Азиз Сергеевич Шавершян; Kurdish: Әзиз Шавәршйан.) (24 March 1989 – 5 August 2011), better known as Zyzz, was an Australian bodybuilder and model. He established a cult following after posting videos of himself on YouTube, starting in 2007.

On 5 August 2011, while on holiday in Thailand, Shavershian suffered a heart attack and died at the age of 22.

== Biography ==
Shavershian was born in Moscow to Kurdish parents from Armenia. He was the youngest son of Maiane Iboian, who works in cardiology, and Sergei Shavershian. He had one older brother, Said Shavershian, who is also known by the screen name "Chestbrah". In 1993, Shavershian, aged four, and his family moved to Australia. He was raised in Eastwood, New South Wales, a suburb of Sydney, and attended Marist College Eastwood secondary school, where he achieved Dux of the college. Prior to his death in August 2011, he was set to graduate from the University of Western Sydney, with a degree in business and commerce.

== Bodybuilding ==
Before becoming a bodybuilder, Shavershian had been described as a "skinny kid" and an ectomorph. Once he completed secondary school, inspired by his bodybuilder brother, he joined a local gym and began learning about nutrition and training, applying it to his pursuit of becoming a bodybuilder. He would spend three to four hours a day training in the gym. His favourite professional bodybuilders included Arnold Schwarzenegger and Frank Zane.

Shavershian recalled that he originally wanted to become a bodybuilder to "impress girls". He said he would look at pictures of "shredded" bodybuilders and tell himself that he would one day be like them. Almost four years into training, he stated that:

I can safely say that my motivation to train goes far beyond that of merely impressing people, it is derived from the feeling of having set goals and achieving them and outdoing myself in the gym. I absolutely love it, the feeling of pushing out that last rep, and getting skin-tearing pumps is something I don't see myself without.

Shavershian was the poster boy of a subculture of amateur bodybuilding in Australia, dubbed "aesthetics", which he had made popular. He had established his own protein supplement label, Protein of the Gods, released in June 2011. He also had a clothing line, and Zyzz's Bodybuilding Bible was released on 17 May 2011, based on a compilation of bodybuilding knowledge he had acquired over his four years of training. He asserted that the internet helped build up his brand, and it was ultimately made possible through the use of social media.

On 14 July 2011, Shavershian's brother Said was arrested for possession of anabolic steroids, to which he pleaded guilty after Aziz's death. The Sydney Morning Herald covered the case, and included a photo of Shavershian. He objected to the use of his picture to illustrate what was essentially an article on the misuse of anabolic steroids.

When asked by The Daily Telegraph, Shavershian denied ever using steroids, and claimed that his physique was the result of hard work in the gym and a strict diet. According to The Sydney Morning Herald, the company which employed Shavershian as a stripper maintained that he was "a lovely guy, aside from the steroids". Shavershian often used phrases such as "riding bicycles", which, according to The Daily Telegraph, is "gym slang for using a cycle of steroids".

== Death ==
On 5 August 2011, Shavershian suffered a heart attack in a sauna while on vacation in Pattaya. He was taken to a hospital, where doctors were unable to revive him. His family and friends placed news of his death on Facebook. His death was confirmed on 9 August 2011 by the Department of Foreign Affairs and Trade (DFAT). An autopsy revealed a previously undiagnosed congenital heart defect and cardiomegaly which triggered cardiac arrest. His family stated he had shown several minor symptoms in the few months leading up to August 2011, including high blood pressure and occasional shortness of breath. He had a family history of heart problems. A 2026 documentary reported that a toxicology report showed "acute respiratory failure due to the combined use of morphine, cocaine and benzodiazepines."

== Legacy ==
According to The Sydney Morning Herald, Shavershian's death was the sixth most searched death-related topic in Australia during 2011. Before his death, Shavershian had posted a video of himself on a social networking site, which would later come out 18th on Nine News's "Top News Videos of the Year" for 2011. Over the May 2011 to May 2012 period, Google statistics showed that he was searched as many times as Julia Gillard, the Prime Minister of Australia at that time.

At the 2012 New Year's Day Field Day festival in Sydney, people dressed up as Shavershian.

Said Shavershian created a 19-minute tribute video for his brother, titled Zyzz - The Legacy, and released it on YouTube on 22 March 2012. The video had been "trending the charts" on YouTube from late March to early April 2012. As of March 2026, the video has over 18.5 million views. Shavershian's followers still post tribute videos dedicated to him, with a lot of them collecting over a million views.

According to a 2013 opinion piece in the Wentworth Courier, whilst hundreds of Wentworth Courier news articles published online have "disappeared into the void" since 2011, the "Zyzz story" continued "to be read and frequently appears in the daily list of most clicked-on articles on the Wentworth Courier website".

In a report on organised crime's control of the underground steroid trade, reporter Mark Willacy called Shavershian the "pin-up boy for the bodybuilding crowd."

In November 2022, Flume covered Bag Raiders' song "Shooting Stars" with Shavershian's older brother, Said (known publicly as Chestbrah), for Triple J's Like a Version. In the cover, Chestbrah enters from behind Flume, and "muzzes out", the dance Zyzz made famous.

A documentary about his life and death by Selina Miles, Poster Boy: Becoming Zyzz, was released in 2026.

== Filmography ==
Year	Title	Role	Notes
2010	Underbelly: The Golden Mile	Extra	Episode: "The Kingdom Come"
2011	The National Road Trip	Zyzz	Multiple episodes
2026	Poster Boy: Becoming Zyzz	Himself	Documentary; Archival footage only
