= Tasya van Ree =

American photographer (born 1976)

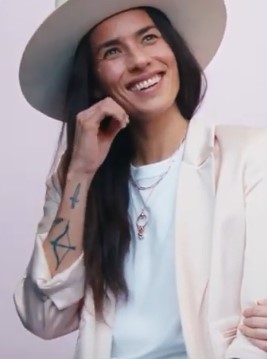
- Van Ree in 2019
- Born: April 30, 1976 (age 50); Mililani, Hawaii, U.S.
- Occupations: Painter; photographer
- Years active: 1994–present
- Partner: Amber Heard (2008–2012)

Tasya van Ree (born April 30, 1976) is an American painter and photographer. She is noted for her work in photography, mixed media, and visual presentation, particularly in fashion and its relation to identity. She is also known for dating actress Amber Heard.

== Early life and education ==
Van Ree is of Dutch and Japanese descent. She was raised in Mililani, Hawaii and was a surfer. She took a photography course in high school and became serious about the craft in her senior year. In 1994, Van Ree moved to Los Angeles to attend college, but she eventually dropped out.

== Career ==
Van Ree is predominantly known for her black-and-white photographs of celebrities, including Michelle Rodriguez, Katherine Moennig and Matt Dallas. She has said that black and white photography "contains a certain presence; it takes the subject matter and ignites a certain lyrical quality within it that one cannot express in words." Van Ree's use of the medium is particularly concerned with the way that the black and white image conveys a sense of time and timelessness, and that the contrast of her modern subjects with the temporal associations of the medium is a source of the intriguing qualities of her photographs. In several interviews, she referred to actress Amber Heard as her main muse: "Gala is to Salvador Dali, Kiki de Montparnasse is to Man Ray, Beatrice is to Dante Alighieri."

In the 2014 exhibit A State of Mind & Affairs of its Games, Van Ree displayed a contrast in both subject matter and medium for her photography. The photos exhibited portrayed toys and popular objects, and were printed in full color.

Her work has been exhibited in several cities and magazines. She has been exhibited both as a solo photographer and with other notable artists, including Gus Van Sant, Amy Arbus, David Lynch, and Jessica Lange. Her work is also featured in private collections.

In addition to photography, Van Ree makes short films and works in other visual media, including painting and pencil drawings. In her drawings, she finds inspiration in her dreams, and has undertaken drawing as an attempt to give the images of her dreams tangibility. This dream-drawing, according to van Ree, also creates a sense of familiarity with her waking life. She also has designed text-based T-shirts, which she calls "DieWilder" and wears herself in public appearances. In August 2015, Van Ree contributed a poem to the "A Letter to My Younger Self" series on the blog for the fashion and home decor online store, The Dreslyn.

=== Exhibits ===
- August 2010 – Untitled Project. L.A.'s Celebrity Vault
- June 2011 – Distorted Delicacies. New York
- September 17, 2011, to October 22, 2011 – A Solo Photography Exhibition – Edgar Varela Fine Arts, Los Angeles
- October 2014 – A State of Mind & Affairs of its Games – Chateau Marmont, Los Angeles.

== Relationship with Amber Heard ==
Van Ree was in a relationship with actress Amber Heard from 2008 to 2012. Heard had her last name legally changed to Van Ree during the relationship. In 2009, Heard was arrested for misdemeanor domestic violence at Seattle–Tacoma International Airport, Washington after allegedly hitting Van Ree. Heard appeared the next day in King County District Court, Seattle but was not charged. The arrest was made public in 2016 during Heard's divorce proceedings from actor Johnny Depp.

A statement was then issued by Van Ree saying that Heard had been "wrongfully" accused and that the incident had been "misinterpreted and over-sensationalized", while also recalling "hints of misogynistic attitudes toward us which later appeared to be homophobic when they found out we were domestic partners and not just 'friends'" and adding that Heard and her "shared 5 wonderful years together and remain close to this day."

The arresting officer, Beverly Leonard, who herself is a lesbian, would subsequently deny both accusations of homophobia and misogyny as being the basis for the arrest made that day. Leonard would go on to post on Facebook, "I am so not homophobic or misogynistic! The arrest was made because an assault occurred (I witnessed it)."
