= Poster Boy: Becoming Zyzz =

2026 documentary about Zyzz

- Directed by: Selina Miles
- Written by: Tom Blackwell; Selina Miles; Harry Wynn
- Produced by: Tom Blackwell; Gal Greenspan; Anu Hasbold
- Starring: Aziz Shavershian
- Distributed by: Stan
- Release date: 15 August 2026
- Running time: 81 minutes
- Country: Australia

Poster Boy: Becoming Zyzz is a 2026 Australian documentary film directed by Selina Miles. The film explores the life, online influence and cultural legacy of Australian internet personality Zyzz.

== Synopsis ==
Poster Boy: Becoming Zyzz focuses on the life of Zyzz and his impact on internet culture and online influencers. The film attempts to convey his aesthetic values and their relation to the early looksmaxxing and manosphere movements, and covers also the circumstances of his death.

== Production ==
Poster Boy: Becoming Zyzz was directed by Selina Miles and produced by Tom Blackwell and Gal Greenspan.

== Release ==
The film was released on 5 August 2026 on Stan.

== Reception ==
Poster Boy: Becoming Zyzz received positive reviews. Terry Pontikos of the Australian Financial Review gave the film four and a half stars, describing the film as "a top-class production drawing on a vast collection of videos and posts devoted to this early movement emanating from Sydney’s suburbs. This is a rare window into the manosphere, a guide into its evolution and how we came to the point where cohorts of young men literally chisel their features with tools to propel them to recognition and fortune." Jenny Valentish of The Guardian wrote "Poster Boy might act as a cautionary tale for a new generation, particularly since looksmaxxing influencer Connor Murphy died in Thailand in July, drowning in a lake amid just as much mystery; or looksmaxxing figurehead Braden Eric Peters AKA Clavicular, who overdosed on a substance mid-livestream in April but was revived." Miles Klee of Wired magazine praised the film, stating "this keenly nuanced film is more than the familiar tale of an ambitious youth who pursued fame at all costs. It also reckons with the digital forces that could produce a person like Zyzz in the first place, and how his preternatural instincts for navigating a brand-new media ecosystem anticipated an entire generation of masculinity influencers."
