= Silenced (2026 film) =

Australian film about the weaponisation of defamation law

- Film poster for Silenced featuring international human rights barrister Jennifer Robinson
- Directed by: Selina Miles
- Written by: Selina Miles
- Based on: How Many More Women? (also published as Silenced Women ) by Jennifer Robinson and Dr. Keio Yoshida
- Produced by: Blayke Hoffman
- Starring: Jennifer Robinson; Amber Heard; Brittany Higgins; Catalina Ruiz-Navarro; Philipa Cracknell; Nicola Stocker; Sibongile Ndashe; Alexi Mostrous; Ana Bejarano Ricaurte; Irene Khan
- Cinematography: Michael Latham
- Edited by: Bernadette Murray
- Music by: Chiara Costanza
- Production companies: Stranger Than Fiction Films; Screen Australia major investment; Minderoo Pictures major investment; ABC major investment; Screen NSW support; Shark Island Foundation support; Soundfirm support
- Distributed by: Sharmill Films
- Release dates: 24 January 2026 (Sundance Film Festival); 3 June 2026 (Sydney Film Festival)
- Running time: 97 minutes
- Country: Australia
- Language: English

Silenced is a 2026 Australian documentary film directed by Selina Miles. The film follows lawyer Jennifer Robinson and her defence of women who alleged abuse as part of the #MeToo movement, including Amber Heard, Brittany Higgins, and Catalina Ruiz-Navarro, against defamation cases.

== Synopsis ==
The documentary follows international human rights barrister Jennifer Robinson as she examines the global weaponisation of defamation laws to quiet sexual assault survivors and journalists. Robinson's work is framed through the personal inspiration of her grandmother, a sexual assault survivor.

Robinson is known for landmark cases related to free speech, indigenous rights and sexual violence. Her early advocacy for West Papuans is used to set the scene that the silencing of victims is one of the grave injustices of our time.

In the documentary, filmmaker Selina Miles interviews Amber Heard, Brittany Higgins and Colombian journalist Catalina Ruiz-Navarro, alongside South African human rights lawyer Sibongile Ndashe, UN special rapporteur Irene Khan and journalist Alexi Mostrous. The film examines Depp v. Heard, Depp v News Group Newspapers Ltd and the Australian Parliament House sexual misconduct allegations against Bruce Lehrmann. The film also includes historical cases such as the Clinton–Lewinsky scandal and Stocker v Stocker.

== Development ==
The project originated following Jennifer Robinson's defence of Amber Heard during the 2020 Depp v News Group Newspapers Ltd case in London. The case prompted Robinson to co-author How Many More Women? (also published as Silenced Women) with Dr. Keio Yoshida, examining legal systems that enable perpetrators to use defamation laws against survivors.

The film received production funding from Screen Australia in March 2025.

== Release ==
=== Festivals ===
Jennifer Robinson, Selina Miles, Catalina Ruiz-Navarro and Brittany Higgins at the premiere of Silenced during the 2026 Sundance Film Festival

The film had its world premiere in the World Cinema Documentary Competition at the 2026 Sundance Film Festival in January 2026.

It made its European premiere at CPH:DOX in Copenhagen in March 2026.

The film had its Australian premiere at the 73rd Sydney Film Festival at the State Theatre in June 2026, where it received a standing ovation. It then screened at the Melbourne International Film Festival in the Premiere With Purpose showcase in August 2026.

It was later screened in the United Kingdom at Sheffield DocFest in June 2026.

=== Cinemas ===
In Australia, the film was distributed by Sharmill Films. The official trailer was released on 10 July 2026, followed by a national theatrical release in Australian cinemas in September 2026.

Prior to its wide release, Sharmill Films conducted a national preview tour throughout August and September 2026 across capital cities including Sydney, Melbourne, Brisbane, Perth, Adelaide, Canberra, and Hobart. The special screenings were accompanied by live panel discussions featuring director Selina Miles, legal expert Jennifer Robinson, and representatives from civil liberties and legal aid organisations.

== Legal warning and subpoena ==
In January 2026, following the film's premiere at Sundance, the filmmakers received a legal letter from Brittany Higgins's former employer and Australian senator Linda Reynolds warning of action if she was defamed.

In June 2026, former political staffer Bruce Lehrmann lost a legal bid to subpoena a copy of the documentary, all raw b-roll and unused footage, and a schedule of the film's distribution from producers. Lehrmann's solicitor, Zali Burrows, argued the film could be prejudicial to potential jurors in Lehrmann's rape trial in Queensland. Judge Richards ruled "there is no legitimate forensic purpose in this subpoena".

== Critical reception ==
Nikki Baughan of ScreenDaily reviewed the film at the Sundance Film Festival and described it as an "essential, galvanising watch" that "goes beyond the headlines to explore the rising legal backlash to the #MeToo movement".

Kristy Strouse of Film Inquiry, also reviewing the film at the Sundance Film Festival, called it an "important documentary to experience" and a "compassionate documentary that mostly does a successful job delivering on its intent".

Sandra Hall of the Sydney Morning Herald gave the film four stars out of five, stating it effectively demonstrates "how the legal system is being used to victimise, discredit and financially ruin survivors, along with journalists who take up their stories".

Nikki Gemmell of The Australian, gave the film four stars, describing it as "sobering, harrowing, intense – and powerful. An important watch, an uncomfortable watch."

Leigh Paatsch of the Daily Telegraph gave the film four stars and described it as "a saddening, maddening report on how justice is failing victims of sexual and domestic violence around the world".

Diana Simmonds of Limelight awarded the film a five-star review, calling it a "powerful post #MeToo documentary".

Emily Jacobson of CinemaFemme said Silenced attempts to "examine as many threads as possible while maintaining a clear throughline with Robinson's experience. ... At times Silenced is attempting to do so much with its runtime that all of these threads become overwhelming".

Stephen Russell of ScreenHub called the film "bracing" and "magnificently hopeful".

Aviva Dove-Viebahn of Ms. said "while Robinson's expertise guides much of the narrative framing of the documentary, Miles still reserves vital space to foreground other important cases, as well as advocates of freedom of speech and freedom of the press from around the world".

Mia Galuppo ofThe Hollywood Reporter said the film "acts as a post-script to the MeToo movement".

Mey Rude of Out said "On one hand, Silenced is viscerally depressing ... On the other hand, the film is also deeply inspiring" and noted review bombing after the Sundance premiere.

== Awards ==
Won Best International Feature Documentary at the Lunenburg DocFest.

Nominated for the Camera Justitia Award, as well as the Grand Jury Documentary Award, at the Movies that Matter Festival.

Nominated for Grand Jury Prize at the Sundance Film Festival.

== Impact and educational resources ==
Supported by Documentary Australia and the Human Rights Law Centre, an impact campaign uses the film as an advocacy tool for reform and anti-SLAPP (Strategic Lawsuits Against Public Participation) legislation in Australia.

Legal expert Jennifer Robinson also discussed the documentary's themes on ABC Radio's Overnights, on the ABC podcast Ladies We Need To Talk.
