= Security for costs =

Security for costs is a common law legal concept of application only in costs jurisdictions, and is an order sought from a court in litigation.

The general rule in costs jurisdiction is that "costs follow the event". In other words, the loser in legal proceedings must pay the legal costs of the successful party. Where a defendant has a reasonable apprehension that its legal costs will not be paid for by the plaintiff if the defendant is successful, the defendant can apply to the court for an order that the plaintiff provide security for costs. Furthermore, the amount that is ordered by the Judge is in direct correlation to the strength or weakness of the plaintiff's case brought herewith. The weaker the probability of the plaintiff prevailing, the higher the security order.

The concept of security for costs derives from the Roman law principle of cautio iudicatum solvi (Latin, transl. "A bond for payment of the judgment").

Often, security for costs rules will apply differently depending on whether the claimant is outside of the jurisdiction of the court: the law of security for costs recognises that orders of the court relating to payment of a party's legal costs can be very difficult to enforce in non-common law jurisdictions, and so will order security to be provided. Security can also be ordered where a plaintiff is insolvent, or prone to vexatious litigation.

Security is usually provided in the form of a bank cheque paid into the court, or held in a trust account operated jointly by both the plaintiff's and defendant's lawyers.

If the defendant is successful, the money can be applied against the costs order. If the claimant is successful, the security is returned to the claimant.

== In England and Wales ==
In England and Wales, the rules for security for costs are contained in part 25 of the Civil Procedure Rules. Courts can grant security for costs for defendants (or cross-claimants, additional parties etc.) in England when the court "is satisfied, having regard to all the circumstances of the case, that it is just to make such an order" and there is either a specific statutory rule governing it or one of five specified conditions is true of the claimant (or party the order is sought against) when they:

1. are not in the jurisdiction, and not in a country that is a signatory to the 2005 Hague Convention
2. "are a company or other body (whether incorporated inside or outside Great Britain) and there is reason to believe that it will be unable to pay the defendant's costs if ordered to do so"
3. have changed their address to avoid consequences of the litigation
4. have either failed to provide an address or provided an incorrect one on the claim form
5. are acting as a nominal claimant on behalf of someone else, and they are unlikely to be able to satisfy the costs
6. they have taken steps in relation to their assets (e.g. hiding them) to prevent them from being recovered

Satisfying one (or more) of these pre-conditions is not enough. As stated, the court has to decide that it is "just to make such an order"—the power to grant security for costs is discretionary.
