= ACT Integrity Commission =

Anti-corruption commission in the Australian Capital Territory

Commission overview
- Formed: 1 July 2019; 7 years ago
- Jurisdiction: Australian Capital Territory
- Employees: 23 (2022–2023) 20 (2021–2022)
- Annual budget: $5.8 million (2022–2023); $4.6 million (2021–2022)
- Commission executives: Michael Adams, Integrity Commissioner; Judy Lind, Chief Executive Officer
- Key documents: Integrity Commission Act 2018 (ACT); Public Interest Disclosure Act 2012 (ACT)
- Website: www.integrity.act.gov.au

The ACT Integrity Commission is an agency of the Australian Capital Territory government established in 2019 to deal with complaints about misconduct in the ACT public sector.

== History ==
In 2018 the Barr Labor-Green government passed the "Integrity Commission Act 2018 (ACT)" which established ACT's Integrity Commission, with a commencement date of 1 July 2018.

== Reviews ==
The ACT Integrity Commission announced that it found the former chief executive of the Canberra Institute of Technology, Leanne Cover, guilty of serious corrupt conduct for failing to consult with the board about a series of multi-million-dollar contracts.

== Criticism ==
The Commission was criticised for not investigating the vast majority of the reports it received.
