= Selina Miles =

Australian documentary film director (born 1987)

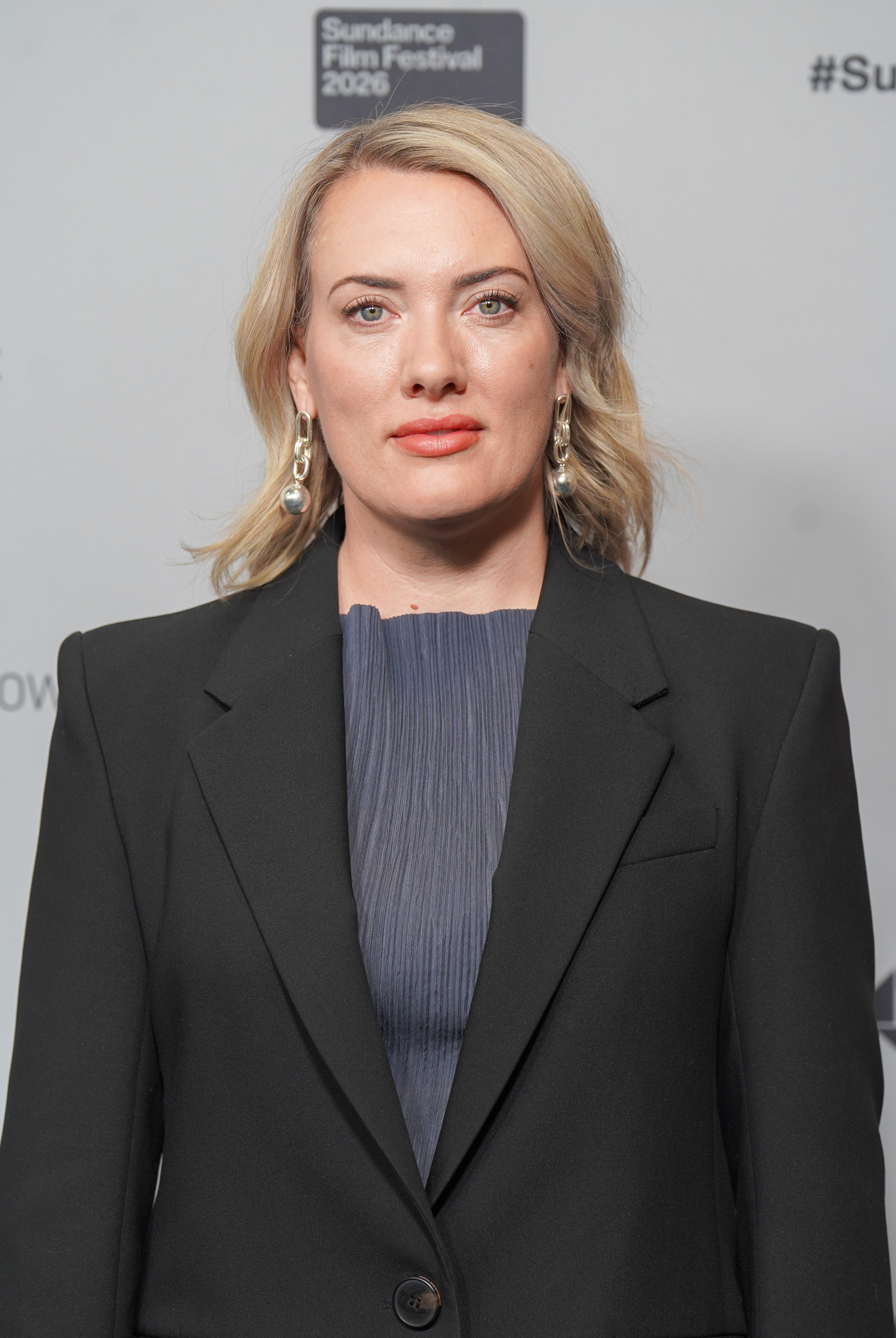
- Miles at Sundance in 2026
- Born: 1987 (age 38–39)
- Education: University of Queensland
- Occupation: Film director
- Known for: Limitless (2013); Martha: A Picture Story (2019); Silenced (2026)
- Website: selinamiles.com

Selina Miles (born 1987) is an Australian documentary film director from Brisbane. She began shooting street art, music videos, and advertising before moving into feature film documentary making.

== Career ==
Miles made Myspace profiles for musicians after leaving university and started in film as an editor. She is self taught. She has worked in brand promotion, including TV commercials. She shot videos for an Australian spray paint company and music videos including for Hilltop Hoods, one being nominated for 2012 Australian Music Video of the Year at the J Awards. Her video for Barkaa's "Blak Matriarchy" was nominated for the ARIA Award for Best Video in 2022. She is represented by Art Bridge in Paris, Bindery in New York, MindsEye in London, and Scoundrel in Sydney.

She directed a five-minute hyperlapse street art video, Limitless, in 2013 about graffiti artists Sofles, Fintan Magee, Treas, and Quench as they spray paint an abandoned warehouse. She shot footage for 80 hours. It received 6 million views in two weeks. The film was a sequel to Infinite, also made with Sofles in 2013. Miles said in 2016 that Nike used her work in Limitless without permission in their "Ousadia Alegria" campaign after an unsuccessful pitch, also aping the work of Rob Whitworth. A BBC Formula 1 video also featured a scene similar to one in Limitless. Miles had been making corporate mining videos, but stopped submitting work when making Limitless and began working in advertising. In 2015 she shot a video of artist Felipe Pantone and worked again with Sofles on a video for the White Night festival in Melbourne. She then directed the street art series The Wanderers for ABC iview. This web series was one of four to receive $50,000AUD in an Art Bites programme from ABC Television and Screen Australia in 2016. One episode featured Guido van Helten's work on train wagons.

Her first feature-length documentary was Martha: A Picture Story, which won awards. Released in 2019, it documented street art photographer Martha Cooper. Miles herself shot street art and graffiti, and decided to make a film about Cooper, who she first worked with at the ONO'U street art festival in Tahiti in 2014, after speaking to Brooklyn Street Art in 2016. It was a follow-up to Miles' series of ten-minute shorts profiling artists, after Miles realised she could not properly document Cooper's life and work in a short film. She spent over 19 months working on the film, accessing Cooper's decades of archival footage and photography including her ex-husband's Super 8 tapes. Miles sought legal advice about filming due to some of the artists conducting illegal activity and protected some identities. The film premiered at the Tribeca Film festival and won the Audience Award for Best Documentary at the 2019 Sydney Film Festival, before a US release in March 2021. Andrew Peirce writing in The Curb said "Selina Miles manages to use all of the tools of cinema to immerse you in the world of Martha Cooper." Moveable Fest said "The soulfulness of Cooper’s photos extends to Miles’ profile of her" and praised the film's structure. The Hollywood Reporter said it was "Eighty of the happiest minutes documentary-lovers are likely to spend in a theater this year". Nell Minow, writing for RogerEbert.com, said "director Selina Miles matches the energy of her subject and of her subject's subject—street art like graffiti and hip hop—with exceptionally dynamic cinematic technique."

In 2020 she released Harley & Katya, a figure skating feature documentary about indigenous Australian Harley Windsor and Russian Katya Alexandrovskaya. It was shown on ABC Australia in December 2022 then released on Netflix in October 2023, when it was nominated for the International Emmy Award for Best Sports Documentary, which it won. It was nominated for the 56th AWGIE Awards.

Miles' documentary Silenced, produced by Stranger Than Fiction, is about lawyer Jennifer Robinson and her defence of women who alleged abuse as part of the #MeToo movement, including Amber Heard, Brittany Higgins, and Catalina Ruiz-Navarro, against defamation cases. Miles was director and screenwriter, and interviewed the women and experts including UN special rapporteur Irene Khan and journalist Alexi Mostrous. The film also included historical cases such as the Clinton–Lewinsky scandal and Stocker v Stocker. The documentary was inspired by Robinson's book "How Many More Women?". It received production funding from Screen Australia in March 2025. Its premiere was at the 2026 Sundance Film Festival in January. Following that screening, the filmmakers received a legal letter from Higgins' former manager Linda Reynolds warning of action if she was defamed. It opened the 73rd Sydney Film Festival at the State Theatre in June 2026, its Australian premiere, where it received a standing ovation. CinemaFemme said "'Silenced' attempts to examine as many threads as possible while maintaining a clear throughline with Robinson’s experience. ... At times 'Silenced' is attempting to do so much with its runtime that all of these threads become overwhelming." ScreenHub called it "bracing" and "magnificently hopeful". Ms. said "While Robinson’s expertise guides much of the narrative framing of the documentary, Miles still reserves vital space to foreground other important cases, as well as advocates of freedom of speech and freedom of the press from around the world." Elizabeth Weitzman reviewing for TheWrap said "Miles shoots [Robinson] in such a glamorous way ... that it inadvertently does this passionate and accomplished professional a disservice", with the film wanting a "sharper center and a tighter edit". POV Magazine and ScreenRant agreed, the former saying "tighter focus might benefit the stories at the documentary’s core" and the latter "Selina Miles' film is too pulled between several directions, overwhelmed by all that it most wants to say", adding that "Silenced works as a solid primer in helping us understand the gaps of the #MeToo movement". The Hollywood Reporter said it "acts as a post-script to the MeToo movement". Out said "On one hand, Silenced is viscerally depressing ... On the other hand, the film is also deeply inspiring" and noted review bombing after the Sundance premiere.

In 2026 she released Poster Boy: Becoming Zyzz, a documentary about Australian bodybuilding influencer Zyzz. She recreated his childhood bedroom for the film. Guardian Australia said "Poster Boy might act as a cautionary tale for a new generation". Miles "was determined not to skate over Zyzz’s at times boorish braggadocio".

== Personal life ==
Miles grew up in Brisbane, where she got to know street artists. She studied multimedia design at the University of Queensland for two years and dropped out of university twice. She has frequently travelled for work, and in 2020 was based in Sydney. She adopted a plant-based diet in 2020 for environmental reasons.
