= Contextual truth defence =

== Overview ==
The contextual truth defence is a statutory defence to an action for defamation under defamation laws of Australia's states and territories. It allows a defendant to escape liability where a publication carries several defamatory imputations, some of which the defendant cannot prove to be true, if the imputations that are substantially true (the "contextual imputations") mean the remaining imputations do no further harm to the plaintiff's reputation.

The defence originated in New South Wales in section 16 of the Defamation Act 1974 (NSW), and was carried into the uniform defamation legislation that commenced in Australia in 2006. A drafting problem in the 2005 version prevented defendants from relying on the plaintiff's own imputations, and the defence was reformulated by the Model Defamation Amendment Provisions 2020, which have commenced in every jurisdiction except Western Australia.

== Purpose ==
Where a publication conveys both a serious defamatory imputation and a less serious one, and the plaintiff expects the defendant could prove the serious imputation true but not the lesser one, the plaintiff may sue only on the lesser imputation. Contextual truth allows the defendant to put the serious, true imputation before the court and argue that the lesser imputation caused no additional harm to the plaintiff's reputation.
