= Amber Heard =

American actress (born 1986)

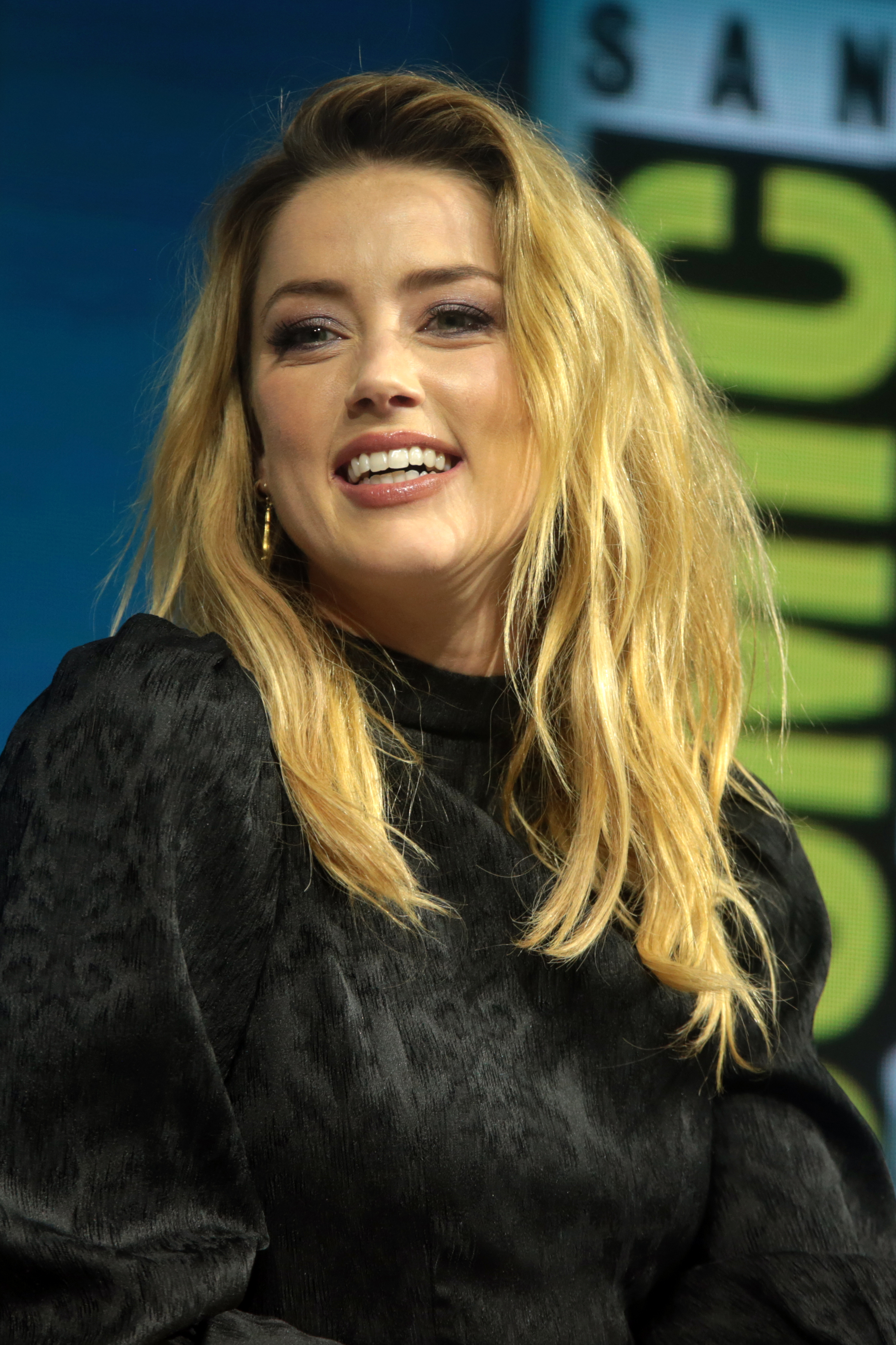
- Heard in 2018
- Born: Amber Laura Heard; April 22, 1986 (age 40); Austin, Texas, U.S.
- Other names: Amber Laura Depp; Amber van Ree
- Occupation: Actress
- Years active: 2003–present
- Spouse: Johnny Depp (m. 2015; div. 2017)
- Partners: Tasya van Ree (2008–2012); Elon Musk (2017–2018)
- Children: 3

Amber Laura Heard (born April 22, 1986) is an American actress. She had her first leading role in the horror film All the Boys Love Mandy Lane (2006), and went on to star in films such as The Ward (2010), Drive Angry (2011), and London Fields (2018).

She has also had supporting roles in films including Pineapple Express (2008), Never Back Down (2008), The Joneses (2009), The Rum Diary (2011), Paranoia (2013), Machete Kills (2013), 3 Days to Kill (2014), Magic Mike XXL (2015), and The Danish Girl (2015). From 2017 to 2023, Heard played Mera in the DC Extended Universe, including the films Justice League (2017), Aquaman (2018), and Aquaman and the Lost Kingdom (2023). She has also acted in television series such as The CW's teen drama Hidden Palms (2007) and the Paramount+ fantasy series The Stand (2020–2021).

In 2016, Heard became a volunteer with the American Civil Liberties Union (ACLU) in the capacity of an ACLU Artist Ambassador, a role reserved for individuals who advocate for civil rights and civil liberties. Heard also served as a Human Rights Ambassador for the Office of the United Nations High Commissioner for Human Rights.

Heard was married to actor Johnny Depp from 2015 to 2017. Afterward, the pair accused each other of domestic abuse and engaged in two lengthy and high-profile defamation cases, the English Depp v. NGN trial where the court ruled that Depp engaged in domestic abuse against Heard, and the widely publicized American Depp v. Heard trial, where she was found liable for defaming Depp.

== Early life ==
Amber Laura Heard was born on April 22, 1986, in Austin, Texas, the middle child of three daughters of internet researcher Patricia Paige (née Parsons; 1956–2020) and construction company owner David Clinton Heard (born 1950). The family lived outside Austin. Heard's father trained horses in his free time, and she grew up riding horses, hunting, and fishing with him. She also participated in beauty pageants, although as an adult she has said that she could no longer "support the objectification". Raised Catholic, Heard began identifying as an atheist at the age of sixteen after her best friend died in a car crash. Heard has cited the works of Ayn Rand as influential to her views, having read all of Rand's books after her friend's death. The following year, no longer comfortable in "conservative, God-fearin' Texas", Heard dropped out of her Catholic high school to pursue an acting career in Los Angeles. She eventually earned a diploma through a home-study course.

== Career ==
=== 2003–2007: Early roles ===
Heard's earliest acting work included appearances in two music videos, Kenny Chesney's "There Goes My Life" and Eisley's "I Wasn't Prepared", and small supporting roles in the television series Jack & Bobby (2004), The Mountain (2004), and The O.C. (2005). She made her film debut in a minor role in the sports drama Friday Night Lights (2004), followed by brief supporting roles in films Drop Dead Sexy (2005), North Country (2005), Side FX (2005), Price to Pay (2006), Alpha Dog (2006), and Spin (2007), and a guest-starring spot in an episode of the police procedural crime drama television series Criminal Minds. Heard received her first leading role in the unconventional slasher film All the Boys Love Mandy Lane, which premiered at the 2006 Toronto International Film Festival, but was not released in Europe until 2008 and in the US until 2013 due to distribution problems.

In 2007, Heard played the love interest of the main character in The CW's teen drama Hidden Palms, which the network aired to replace summer reruns of other series aimed at teenage audiences. That same year, Heard also appeared in the short movie Day 73 with Sarah, in the teen drama Remember the Daze, and in an episode of the Showtime series Californication.

=== 2008–2016: Mainstream recognition ===
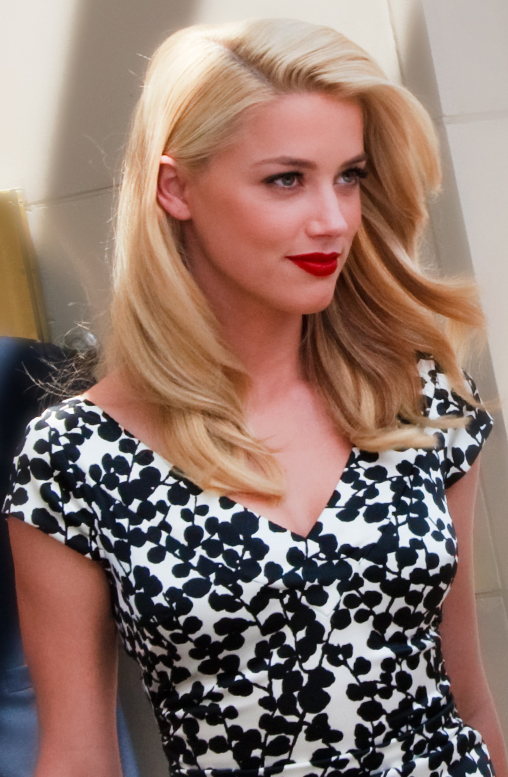
Heard at the 2009 Toronto International Film Festival

Heard gained mainstream recognition in 2008 with supporting roles in the Judd Apatow-produced stoner comedy Pineapple Express and the martial arts drama Never Back Down. She also appeared as part of an ensemble cast in an adaptation of Bret Easton Ellis's novel The Informers (2008). The following year, Heard starred in The Joneses (2009) opposite David Duchovny and Demi Moore; Variety wrote that Heard "more or less steals the show" from Moore. Outside a brief appearance in the box office hit Zombieland (2009), Heard's other films during this time were either independent films that received only limited theatrical release—ExTerminators (2009), The River Why (2010), And Soon the Darkness (2010)—or critically panned horror films—The Stepfather (2009), The Ward.

Heard's first film release in 2011 was Drive Angry, a supernatural action thriller in which she was paired with Nicolas Cage. The film underperformed commercially, but film critic Roger Ebert wrote that she "does everything that can possibly be done" with her character, a waitress who becomes entangled in an undead man's mission to save his daughter from a cult. In early 2011, Heard also appeared on the British television program Top Gear as a star in a reasonably priced car coming 33rd of 41 on their Cee'd leaderboard. Heard next starred in NBC's The Playboy Club, a crime drama series about the original Playboy Club in 1960s Chicago. After poor reviews and ratings as well as protests from both feminists and conservative groups, the series was canceled after only three episodes had aired. Heard's third role of 2011 was as the love interest of the main character, played by Johnny Depp, in the Hunter S. Thompson adaptation The Rum Diary (2011). A commercial failure, grossing $30 million on a $45 million budget, the film received mixed reviews. In 2011, Heard appeared in an advertisement campaign for the fashion brand Guess.

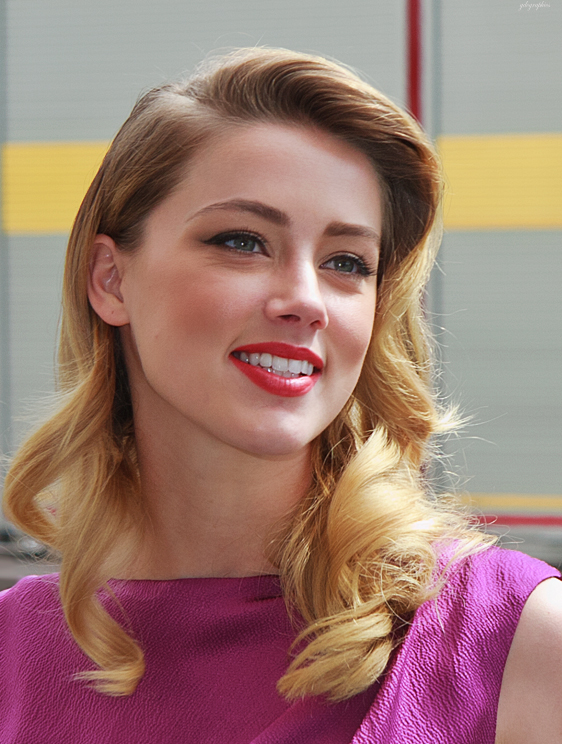
Heard in 2010 at the Toronto International Film Festival

Heard next starred in the thriller Paranoia (2013), the exploitation film Machete Kills (2013), and the satire Syrup (2013). That year also saw the US limited release of All the Boys Love Mandy Lane. Heard's performance in the film was deemed her "most definitive to date" by the Los Angeles Times and "psychologically interesting" by The Washington Post. In 2014, Heard appeared in a supporting role in the action-thriller 3 Days to Kill.

In 2015, Heard had a prominent role in the comedy-drama Magic Mike XXL, playing the love interest of the film's protagonist, Channing Tatum. Heard also had a small supporting role in Tom Hooper's period drama The Danish Girl (2015), and a starring role opposite James Franco and Ed Harris in the independent crime thriller The Adderall Diaries (2015). IndieWire stated that although Heard was "miscast" in The Adderrall Diaries, she "displays much potential and has succeeded in a bid to be taken more seriously". Her fourth role in 2015 was opposite Christopher Walken in the television film One More Time, which aired on Starz. For her role as a struggling singer-songwriter, she took singing lessons and learned to play piano and guitar. The Los Angeles Times called her performance "superb" and The Film Stage stated that Heard did an "admirable job". Heard also appeared in a November 2015 episode of the American automotive reality series Overhaulin', in which her Mustang received a makeover. It also featured the cast pranking Heard at the behest of Depp.

Heard played the female lead in London Fields, an adaptation of Martin Amis's novel about a clairvoyant femme fatale who knows she will be murdered. It premiered at the 2015 Toronto International Film Festival. Shortly after the screening, the film was pulled from release due to disagreements between its director and producers, and due to litigation. (Note: In a second lawsuit involving the producers of London Fields, Heard was sued, in November 2016, for $10 million. The producer's lawsuit claimed that Heard and Mathew Cullen (the film's director) made unauthorized changes to the film's script and failed to finish voice-over work. Heard countersued, claiming the producers had violated a nudity clause in her contract. In September 2018, a settlement was reached between Heard and the producers with no money changing hands.) Heard was sued for $10 million for allegedly breaching performance and promotional obligations. The actress countersued, claiming the producers had violated a nudity rider in her contract. In September 2018, a settlement was reached, and the film was finally released. It received highly negative reviews, and Heard later stated that "it was one of the most difficult movies to film and it has proven to continue to be difficult ... I can't say I did [the character] justice". Jane Mulkerrins of The Daily Telegraph wrote that Heard provided "a decent enough turn as the enigmatic [Nicola Six]" that still could not save the adaptation, while Peter Sobczynski of RogerEbert.com said that she "just does not project the kind of mystery and allure" that the character requires. In 2019, Heard's performance in the film received a nomination for the Golden Raspberry Award for Worst Actress.

=== 2017–present: DC Extended Universe and other projects ===
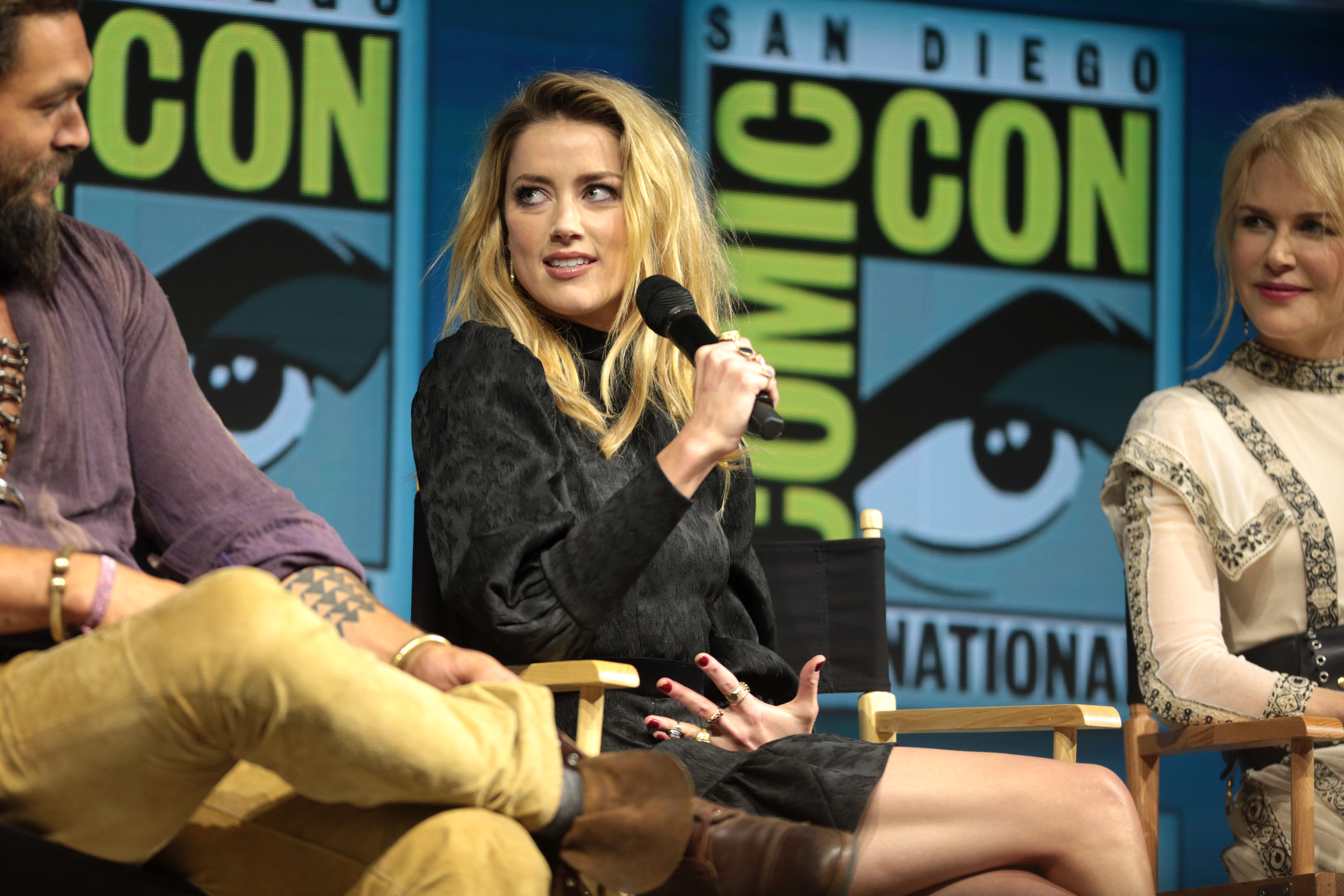
Heard discussing Aquaman at the 2018 San Diego Comic-Con

In 2017, Heard appeared as part of an ensemble cast in Lake Bell's indie comedy I Do... Until I Don't and joined the DC Extended Universe (DCEU) cast as Mera, a princess of an Atlantean kingdom, in the superhero film Justice League. She reprised the role the following year in Aquaman, which co-starred Jason Momoa and marked Heard's first major role in a studio film. She cited Mera's trait of being "a strong, independent, self-possessed superhero in her own right" as one of the reasons for her attraction to the role as well as Mera's rejection of being called Aquawoman instead of by her own name. Aquaman received mixed reviews. It was a commercial success, grossing over $1 billion. The Chicago Tribune's Michael Phillips and The Independent's Geoffrey Macnab respectively noted that Heard "lends a blasé air of early '50s B-movie cheese" and that she "camps it up entertainingly" as Mera. That same year, Heard was appointed global ambassador for cosmetics brand L'Oréal Paris.

In 2019, Heard had supporting roles in the independent dramas Her Smell and Gully. Her only project released in 2020 was The Stand, a miniseries based on Stephen King's novel of the same name. She played Nadine Cross, a school teacher who is among the few survivors of an apocalyptic plague. It premiered on CBS All Access in December 2020, with the series finale airing in February 2021. In 2021, Heard reprised her role as Mera in the superhero film Zack Snyder's Justice League, a director's cut of the 2017 film, for which she had also filmed new scenes.

Heard reprised her Mera role in Aquaman and the Lost Kingdom (2023), a sequel to Aquaman. An online petition to remove Heard from the film began following her ex-husband Depp's loss in his UK libel case and his replacement in the Fantastic Beasts films in 2020. Heard described the campaign as "paid rumors and paid campaigns on social media", and the film's co-producer, Peter Safran, confirmed that Heard would appear in the sequel. By the start of the 2022 Depp v. Heard trial in the US, the petition had reached 2 million signatures. Heard stated that she "'fought really hard to stay in the movie' but that 'they didn't want to include me in the film' and only shot a 'very pared-down version' of her part". Walter Hamada, a former DC Studios president, and James Wan, the film's director, attributed the reduction of Heard's role to the sequel's intention to focus on the relationship between Momoa and Patrick Wilson's characters.

Following the release of Aquaman and the Lost Kingdom in 2023, several critics observed that, true to what Heard claimed in court, some of her scenes seemed to have been cut from the film. One critic writing for Business Insider stated that "Despite WB and Wan's claim, it's tough to believe there wasn't another version of the film where Mera teamed up with her husband to track down his brother and the trio confronted Black Manta." Another critic noted that "Heard, a steely highlight of Aquaman, here feels as though her scenes were all added in post" and that "Given the clunky way Mera is literally silenced in the movie... it's hard not to assume that someone important in the production considered her a liability and made a decision of profound, deeply disappointing cowardice: To treat her as radioactive." Echoing these sentiments, another critic wrote that "the fact that Heard's role is so sloppy and awkward suggests this wasn't the plan all along. It truly looks as if someone erased her actual role and then tossed her into the movie at the last minute as an afterthought" and further added that this is consistent with "Heard's allegations of the film cutting her role from the original script". In a more recent interview, Dolph Lundgren confirmed these observations by noting that "the original script was great... I was a bigger part of it and Amber Heard was a bigger part of it" while also lamenting that "The studio decided... to just reshoot a bunch of footage to try to rebuild a slightly different story line".

Heard's first role after the trial was in the Conor Allyn film In the Fire, which premiered at the Taormina Film Fest in June 2023 and was released that October. In 2025, Heard appeared in Jeremy O. Harris' play Spirit of the People, which premiered in July at the Williamstown Theatre Festival's MainStage Theatre.

== Activism ==
Heard traveled to the Mexico–United States border with Amnesty International and worked with the organization on a bilingual campaign to raise awareness about US immigration policies. She supported the Office of the United Nations High Commissioner for Human Rights' Stand Up for Human Rights campaign. Heard was one of the speakers at the United Nations' 9th Annual Social Good Summit in September 2018. In her talk, she highlighted the centrality of humans and significance of fairness and justice, as embodied in the Universal Declaration of Human Rights. Ahead of the 70th anniversary of the declaration's drafting, Heard gave a speech at HagueTalks' Imagine the World We Want event in October 2018.

In April 2018, Heard joined the Syrian American Medical Society (SAMS) on a multi-specialty medical mission to the Zaatari refugee camp in Jordan as a goodwill ambassador. She then partnered with SAMS to help finance treatment for children in the camp with thalassemia. In November 2018, she visited Smile Train's programs in Mexico, during which she met with children with cleft lip and cleft palate, their families, and doctors. In February 2019, Heard joined SAMS' mission to Lebanon to help Syrian refugees living in poverty, during which she visited informal settlements in Beqaa Valley. She also partnered with SAMS in raising funds for psychosocial and educational programs and vocational training for the women and children in these settlements.

In November 2016, Heard appeared in a public service announcement (PSA) on domestic violence for the #GirlGaze Project. In the PSA, she spoke about the importance of making it easier for violence against women (VAW) survivors to come forward and self-advocate. She also highlighted the importance of taking responsibility for how VAW is handled and discussed in society. In a letter published in the December 2016 issue of Porter magazine, she spoke to "every woman who is suffering in silence", assuring them that they "may not see us, but we are there. Your sisters are everywhere... and we are with you."

During The Economist's Pride and Prejudice event in March 2017, Heard highlighted the underrepresentation of LGBTQ characters in the Hollywood film industry. Referencing her own coming out story, she praised actresses that are candid about their sexuality and encouraged men in the industry to help "challenge the status quo". In August 2017, Heard produced a short video for the publication, in which she spoke about the gender pay gap and underrepresentation of women in the industry. In 2018, Heard became an ambassador for the American Civil Liberties Union (ACLU), aiding the organization's advocacy for justice in gender issues.

In August 2016, Heard pledged to donate her $7 million divorce settlement with Johnny Depp to the ACLU and Children's Hospital Los Angeles (CHLA). In November 2016, she defended this pledge against an allegation from TMZ—despite Depp not having completed the payment to her—that she had not yet made the donations as pledged. CHLA included Heard in their "Honor Roll of Donors" list for the fiscal year 2017. Depp finished paying the full settlement to Heard in October 2018. On the Dutch talk show RTL Late Night in October 2018, Heard said she had donated $7 million to the ACLU and CHLA. As part of Depp v News Group Newspapers Ltd, Heard stated in a 2020 testimony that the settlement's full amount was donated to charity.

In January 2021, the Daily Mail reported an allegation made by Depp's lawyers that Heard had yet to complete her donations. In response to this claim, Heard's lawyer stated that Heard intended to "eventually fulfill her pledge" but had "been delayed in that goal because ... she has been forced to spend millions of dollars" following Depp's lawsuit. During the 2022 Depp v. Heard trial, the corporate designee of CHLA testified that as of 2021, Heard had given the organization $250,000. The ACLU's chief operating officer testified in December 2021 that the organization expected to receive the money over a 10-year period. To that time, a total of $1.3 million had been donated to the ACLU in Heard's name between 2016 and 2018. Heard testified that defending the case had cost her more than $6 million in legal fees and that she planned to resume her donations when she could.

In May 2019, Heard gave a speech on Capitol Hill in support of the SHIELD Act, discussing her experience with the nonconsensual leak of her private photos obtained via hacking as part of the 2014 celebrity nude photo leak. Heard wrote an op-ed in The New York Times in November 2019, deeming "revenge porn" an inappropriate label due to the lack of consent for the images' disclosure and emphasizing the importance of congressional legislation to protect privacy in light of state laws' failure. In the same month, Heard, together with Nico Tortorella and DC Comics, was awarded for "their activism and commitment to disenfranchised youth" by the Hetrick-Martin Institute. Prior to the 2020 United States presidential election, Heard appeared in an election ad created by artist Marilyn Minter in support of Planned Parenthood and participated in the VoteRiders #IDCheck Challenge on social media.

In 2026, Selina Miles released the documentary Silenced which is about how defamation laws have become weaponised by alleged perpetrators against women for speaking out. International human rights lawyer Jennifer Robinson shows how the legal system is used to victimise and discredit survivors, including Heard, Brittany Higgins and Catalina Ruiz-Navarro.

== Personal life ==
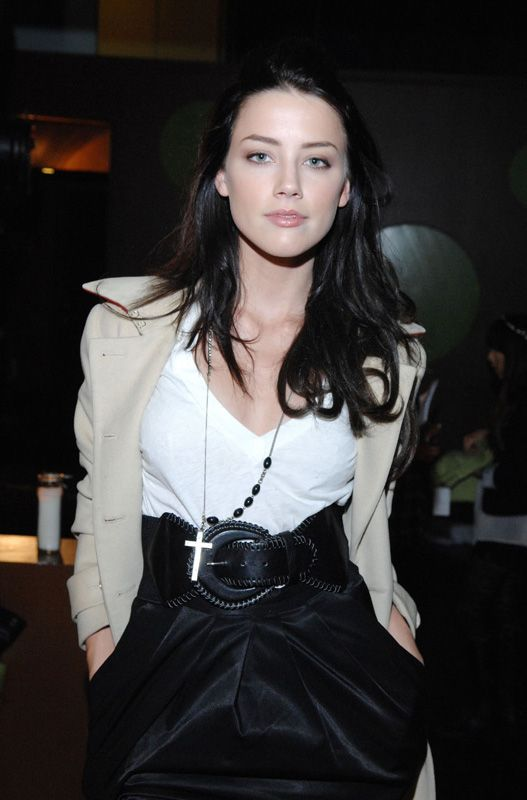
Heard in 2009

Heard publicly came out in 2010, but has stated, "I don't label myself one way or another – I have had successful relationships with men and now a woman. I love who I love; it's the person that matters."

Heard was in a relationship with painter and photographer Tasya van Ree from 2008 to 2012. Heard legally adopted the surname van Ree during their relationship and reverted to her birth surname in 2014. In 2009, Heard was arrested for misdemeanor domestic violence at Seattle–Tacoma International Airport, Washington, after allegedly hitting van Ree. Heard appeared the next day in King County District Court, Seattle but was not charged. The arrest was made public in 2016 during Heard's divorce proceedings from actor, musician, and filmmaker Johnny Depp. A statement was then issued by Heard's publicist in which van Ree said that Heard had been "wrongfully" accused and that the incident had been "misinterpreted and over-sensationalized", while also recalling "hints of misogynistic attitudes toward us which later appeared to be homophobic when they found out we were domestic partners and not just 'friends'" and adding that she and Heard "shared 5 wonderful years together and remain close to this day".

Heard was one of the victims of the 2014 celebrity nude photo leak, in which "more than 50 of [her] personal photos were stolen and released to the public," with Heard later both speaking and writing against such breaches of privacy.

Following her divorce from Johnny Depp, Heard dated businessman and Tesla CEO Elon Musk for a year, until early 2018. She later had a relationship with actress and cinematographer Bianca Butti from January 2020 to December 2021.

In April 2021, Heard had her first child, a daughter, via surrogacy. In December 2024, Heard announced that she was expecting her second child. On May 11, 2025, Heard announced the arrival of twins, a daughter and son. As of 2026, Heard lives in Madrid, Spain.

=== Relationship with Johnny Depp ===
Heard first met actor Johnny Depp in 2009 when she was cast in The Rum Diary opposite him. According to reports, the couple began dating in 2012 and were married in a civil ceremony in February 2015.

==== Australian customs incident ====
In April 2015, Heard and Depp breached Australia's biosecurity laws when they failed to declare in customs the two dogs accompanying them when they flew into Queensland, where Depp was working on Pirates of the Caribbean: Dead Men Tell No Tales. In May 2015, the dogs were flown out of the country hours before a euthanasia deadline. Later in July of the same year, only Heard was charged for this breach in the laws.

By December 2015, the case had been adjourned four times with Heard having instructed her lawyers to enter not guilty pleas and stating that she was "looking forward" to fighting the charges. In the court case in April 2016, Heard pleaded guilty to falsifying quarantine documents, stating that she had made a mistake due to sleep deprivation. While criminal charges were dropped, she was placed on a A$1,000 (US$752) one-month good behaviour bond for producing a false document; Heard and Depp released a video apologizing for their behavior and urging others to adhere to biosecurity laws.

==== Divorce ====
Heard filed for divorce from Depp in May 2016 and obtained a temporary restraining order against him, releasing a statement saying that, "During the entirety of our relationship, Johnny has been verbally and physically abusive to me. I endured excessive emotional, verbal and physical abuse from Johnny, which has included angry, hostile, humiliating and threatening assaults to me whenever I questioned his authority or disagreed with him." She requested $50,000 a month "as and for pendente lite spousal support based on [their] marital lifestyle". In response, Depp's counsel said "Amber is attempting to secure a premature financial resolution by alleging abuse", but agreed with her request for a restraining order, saying Depp "nonetheless has every intention of staying away from Amber and will stipulate to mutual stay-away and personal conduct orders".

A settlement amount for the divorce was arrived at in August 2016, and Heard pledged to donate the proceeds equally between the ACLU and CHLA. She dropped her request for a continued restraining order and she and Depp issued a joint statement saying that their "relationship was intensely passionate and at times volatile, but always bound by love. Neither party has made false accusations for financial gain. There was never any intent of physical or emotional harm."

The final terms of the settlement were agreed upon by January 2017 with Depp being required to complete the payment of $7 million to Heard by February 2018, contribute $500,000 towards Heard's attorneys fees, and to give Heard custody of their two dogs, a horse, and two cars. Depp was to retain all his real estate assets and 42 vehicles and no spousal support would be paid by either party. In her 2022 testimony, Heard stated that because they had no prenuptial agreement, she would have been entitled to half of Depp's earnings of $65 million during the marriage had she requested it.

==== Depp v News Group Newspapers Ltd ====
In June 2018, Depp brought a libel lawsuit in the United Kingdom against News Group Newspapers (NGN), the company publishing The Sun, which had labeled him a "wife beater" in an April 2018 article. Heard was a key witness for NGN during the highly publicized trial in July 2020. In November 2020, the presiding judge found that Depp had lost his claim and that "the great majority of alleged assaults of Ms Heard by Mr Depp [12 out of the 14] have been proved to the civil standard". The court rejected Depp's claim of a hoax, and accepted that the allegations Heard had made against Depp had damaged her career and activism. Depp's appeal to overturn the verdict was rejected in March 2021.

==== Depp v. Heard ====
In February 2019, Depp sued Heard for defamation over a December 2018 op-ed for The Washington Post. In the lawsuit, Depp alleged that the op-ed contained three defamatory statements, the first of which was a headline:

- "Amber Heard: I spoke up against sexual violence — and faced our culture's wrath. That has to change."
- "Then two years ago, I became a public figure representing domestic abuse, and I felt the full force of our culture's wrath for women who speak out."
- "I had the rare vantage point of seeing, in real time, how institutions protect men accused of abuse."

Depp also alleged that Heard had been the one who abused him, and that her allegations constituted a hoax against him.

In August 2020, Heard filed a counterclaim against Depp, alleging that he had coordinated "a harassment campaign via Twitter and [by] orchestrating online petitions to get her fired from Aquaman and L'Oréal". Ultimately, Heard's counterclaim went to trial over three allegations that Depp had defamed her through statements made by his then-lawyer, Adam Waldman, published in the Daily Mail in April 2020, where Waldman stated:

- "Heard and her friends in the media used fake sexual violence allegations as both sword and shield", publicizing a "sexual violence hoax" against Depp.
- ... in one incident at a penthouse, "Amber and her friends spilled a little wine and roughed the place up, got their stories straight under the direction of a lawyer and publicist, and then placed a second call to 911" as "an ambush, a hoax" against Depp.
- ... there had been an "abuse hoax" by Heard against Depp.

The Depp-Heard trial took place in Fairfax County, Virginia between April 11 and June 1, 2022. The verdict was that for Depp's lawsuit, the jury found that all three statements from Heard's op-ed were false, defamed Depp, and were made with actual malice, so the jury awarded Depp $10 million in compensatory damages and $5 million in punitive damages from Heard. The punitive damages were reduced to $350,000 due to a limit imposed by Virginia state law. For Heard's counterclaim, the jury found that Waldman's first and third statements to the Daily Mail had not been proven to be defamatory, while finding that Waldman's second statement to the Daily Mail was false, defamatory and made with actual malice. As a result, Heard was awarded $2 million in compensatory damages and zero in punitive damages from Depp.

During the trial, online public sentiment was generally against Heard. Her testimony, which was widely ridiculed, was thought to be false. Heard said she was "harassed, humiliated, threatened every single day" and described online criticism of her testimony as "agonizing". An interviewer hypothesized that the jury had reviewed the evidence and had not believed Heard's testimony and Heard responded to this by questioning how the jury could have believed her by the time she got on the stand when they had already listened "to three-and-a-half weeks of testimony about how I was a non-credible person".

The day after the verdict was read, Heard's lawyer, Elaine Bredehoft, told interviewers that Heard could not afford to pay the damages owed to Depp and would appeal the verdict. A month later, one of Heard's insurance providers, New York Marine, sued Heard in federal court, wanting to avoid paying up to $1 million for her legal defense fees in the Virginia case, arguing that the "jury's factual findings establish that Heard's liability is caused by the willful act(s) of Heard"; hence, New York Marine is "not liable" for the loss.

After they both filed to appeal the verdict, Depp and Heard settled the case in December 2022, with Heard publicly stating that even if her appeal succeeds, she "simply cannot go through" a retrial, while maintaining that the settlement was "not an act of concession". Meanwhile, Depp's lawyers stated that the "jury's unanimous decision and the resulting judgement in Mr. Depp's favor against Ms. Heard remain fully in place", and that the settlement would result in $1 million being paid to Depp by Heard's insurer, which "Depp is pledging and will donate to charities".

===== Public reaction =====
Following the 2022 defamation trial between Johnny Depp and Amber Heard, Heard said she experienced significant emotional distress as a result of the public reaction to the case. In a televised interview with NBC News shortly after the verdict, she stated that she had received widespread online harassment, ridicule, and threats and described the experience as emotionally overwhelming. After the verdict, Heard also said she was "heartbroken" and that the backlash had negatively affected both her personal well-being and professional career.

Coverage by NBC News and The Washington Post described the trial as a major social-media phenomenon, with content on platforms including TikTok overwhelmingly critical of Heard and contributing to extensive public scrutiny.

== Acting credits ==
=== Film ===
Year	Title	Role	Notes	Ref.
2004	Friday Night Lights	Maria		
2005	Side FX	Shay		
2005	Drop Dead Sexy	Candy		
2005	North Country	Young Josey Aimes		
2006	Price to Pay	Trish		
2006	Alpha Dog	Alma		
2006	All the Boys Love Mandy Lane	Mandy Lane		
2007	Spin	Amber		
2007	Day 73 with Sarah	Mary	Short film	
2007	Remember the Daze	Julia Ford		
2008	Never Back Down	Baja Miller		
2008	The Informers	Christie		
2008	Pineapple Express	Angie Anderson		
2009	ExTerminators	Nikki		
2009	The Joneses	Jenn Jones		
2009	Zombieland	406		
2009	The Stepfather	Kelly Porter		
2010	And Soon the Darkness	Stephanie	Also co-producer	
2010	The River Why	Eddy		
2010	The Ward	Kristen		
2011	Drive Angry	Piper		
2011	The Rum Diary	Chenault		
2013	Syrup	Six	Also executive producer	
2013	Paranoia	Emma Jennings		
2013	Machete Kills	Miss San Antonio		
2014	3 Days to Kill	Agent Vivi Delay		
2015	The Adderall Diaries	Lana Edmond		
2015	One More Time	Jude		
2015	Magic Mike XXL	Zoe		
2015	The Danish Girl	Ulla Poulsen		
2017	I Do... Until I Don't	Fanny		
2017	Justice League	Mera		
2018	Her Smell	Zelda E. Zekiel		
2018	London Fields	Nicola Six	Filmed in 2013	
2018	Aquaman	Mera		
2019	Gully	Joyce		
2021	Zack Snyder's Justice League	Mera	Director's cut of Justice League	
2023	In the Fire	Grace Victoria Burnham	Also executive producer	
2023	Aquaman and the Lost Kingdom	Mera		
2026	Silenced	Herself	Documentary	

=== Television ===
Year	Title	Role	Notes	Ref.
2004	Jack & Bobby	Liz	Episode: "Pilot"	
2004	The Mountain	Riley	Episode: "A Piece of the Rock"	
2005	The O.C.	Salesgirl	Episode: "Mallpisode"	
2006	Criminal Minds	Lila Archer	Episode: "Somebody's Watching"	
2007	Californication	Amber	Episode: "California Son"	
2007	Hidden Palms	Greta Matthews	Main role; 8 episodes	
2010	The Cleveland Show	Herself	Voice role; Episode: "Beer Walk!"	
2011	Top Gear	Herself	Episode: "Episode#16.5"	
2011	The Playboy Club	Bunny Maureen	Main role; 7 episodes	
2015	Overhaulin'	Herself	Episode: "In Too Depp"	
2020–2021	The Stand	Nadine Cross	Miniseries; 7 episodes	

=== Music videos ===
Year	Title	Artist
2003	"There Goes My Life"	Kenny Chesney
2005	"I Wasn't Prepared" (Version 1)	Eisley

=== Theater ===
Year	Title	Role	Venue	Notes	Ref.
2025	Spirit of the People	Genevieve	Williamstown Theatre	July 17, 2025-August 3, 2025	

== Awards and nominations ==
Year	Award	Category	Work	Result
2008	Young Hollywood Awards	Breakthrough of the Year	Herself	Won
2009	Detroit Film Critics Society Awards	Best Ensemble	Zombieland	Nominated
2010	Scream Awards	Best Ensemble	Zombieland	Won
2010	Dallas International Film Festival	Dallas Star Award	Herself	Won
2011	Hollywood Film Festival	Spotlight Award	The Rum Diary	Won
2014	Texas Film Hall of Fame	Inductee	Herself	Won
2019	Golden Raspberry Awards	Worst Actress	London Fields	Nominated
2019	MTV Movie & TV Awards	Best Kiss	Aquaman	Nominated
2019	Saturn Awards	Best Supporting Actress	Aquaman	Nominated
2019	Teen Choice Awards	Choice Sci-Fi/Fantasy Movie Actress	Aquaman	Nominated

== See also ==
- List of atheists in film, radio, television and theater
