= Australia =

Country mostly on the Australian continent

Commonwealth of Australia
- Flag Coat of arms
- Anthem: "Advance Australia Fair" (Note: Australia also has a royal anthem, "God Save the King", which may be played in place of or alongside the national anthem when members of the royal family are present. If not played alongside the royal anthem, the national anthem is instead played at the end of an official event.)
- Commonwealth of Australia External territories of Australia
- Capital: Canberra; 35°18′29″S 149°07′28″E
- Largest city: Sydney (metropolitan); Melbourne (urban) (Note: Sydney is the largest city based on Australian Bureau of Statistics (ABS) Greater Capital City Statistical Areas (GCCSAs). These represent labour markets and the functional area of Australian capital cities. Melbourne is larger based on ABS Significant Urban Areas (SUAs). These represent Urban Centres, or groups of contiguous Urban Centres, that contain a population of 10,000 people or more.)
- National language: English
- Religion (2021): 43.9% Christianity; 38.9% no religion; 3.2% Islam; 2.7% Hinduism; 2.4% Buddhism; 1.7% other; 7.2% unanswered (Note: The religion question is optional in the Australian census.)
- Demonyms: Australian; Aussie (colloquial) (Note: Pronounced "Ozzy")
- Government: Federal parliamentary constitutional monarchy
  - Monarch: Charles III
  - Governor-General: Sam Mostyn
  - Prime Minister: Anthony Albanese
- Legislature: Parliament
  - Upper house: Senate
  - Lower house: House of Representatives

Independence from the United Kingdom
  - Federation: 1 January 1901
  - Balfour Declaration: 15 November 1926
  - Statute of Westminster Adoption Act: 9 October 1942
  - Australia Acts: 3 March 1986

Area
  - Total: 7,688,287 km^{2} (2,968,464 sq mi) (6th)
  - Water (%): 1.79 (2015)

Population
  - 2025 (December) estimate: ▲27,801,023 (54th)
  - 2021 census: ▲25,890,773
  - Density: 3.7/km^{2} (9.6/sq mi) (237th)
- GDP (PPP): 2026 estimate
  - Total: ▲$2.107 trillion (22nd)
  - Per capita: ▲$75,039 (26th)
- GDP (nominal): 2026 estimate
  - Total: ▲$2.111 trillion (12th)
  - Per capita: ▲$75,172 (13th)
- Gini (2020): ▼32.4 medium inequality
- HDI (2023): ▲0.958 very high (7th)
- Currency: Australian dollar ($) (AUD)
- Time zone: UTC+8; +9.5; +10 (AWST, ACST, AEST (Note: There are minor variations from three basic time zones; see Time in Australia.))
  - Summer (DST): UTC+10.5; +11 (ACDT, AEDT)
- DST not observed in Qld, WA and NT
- Date format: dd/mm/yyyy
- Calling code: +61
- ISO 3166 code: AU
- Internet TLD: .au

Australia, officially the Commonwealth of Australia, is a country comprising the mainland of the Australian continent, the island of Tasmania and numerous smaller islands. (Note: 42% of the Antarctic continent is also claimed by the country; however this is only recognised by the UK, France, New Zealand and Norway.) It has a land area of 7,688,287 km^{2} (2,968,464 sq mi), making it the sixth-largest country in the world, and is the world's flattest and driest inhabited continent. It is a megadiverse country, and its size gives it a wide variety of landscapes and climates, including large deserts centrally and tropical rainforests along the coast.

The ancestors of Aboriginal Australians began arriving from Southeast Asia 50,000 to 65,000 years ago, during the Last Glacial Period. By the time of British settlement, Aboriginal Australians spoke more than 250 distinct languages and had one of the oldest living cultures in the world. Australia's written history commenced with Dutch exploration of most of the coastline in the 17th century. British colonisation began in 1788 with the establishment of the penal colony of New South Wales. By the mid-19th century, most of the continent had been explored by European settlers and five additional self-governing British colonies were established, each gaining responsible government by 1890. The colonies federated in 1901, forming the Commonwealth of Australia. This continued a process of increasing autonomy from the United Kingdom, highlighted by the Statute of Westminster Adoption Act 1942, and culminating in the Australia Act 1986.

Australia is a parliamentary democracy with a constitutional monarchy, and a federation comprising six states and ten territories. Its population of almost 29 million is highly urbanised and heavily concentrated on the eastern seaboard. Canberra is the nation's capital, while its most populous cities are Sydney and Melbourne, each with a population of more than five million. Australia's culture is diverse, and the country has one of the highest foreign-born populations in the world. It has a highly developed economy and one of the highest per capita incomes globally. Its abundant natural resources and well-developed international trade relations are crucial to the country's economy. It ranks highly for quality of life, health, education, economic freedom, civil liberties and political rights.

Australia is a middle power, and has the world's fourteenth-highest military expenditure. It is a member of international groups including: the United Nations, the G20, the OECD, the World Trade Organization, Asia-Pacific Economic Cooperation, the Pacific Islands Forum, the Pacific Community and the Commonwealth of Nations. Australia also participates in the defence, intelligence and security alliances ANZUS, AUKUS and Five Eyes. It is a major non-NATO ally of the United States.

== Etymology ==
The name Australia (pronounced /əˈstreɪliə/ in Australian English) is derived from the Latin Terra Australis Incognita ('unknown southern land'), a name used for a hypothetical continent in the Southern Hemisphere since ancient times. Several 16th-century cartographers used the word Australia on maps, but not to identify modern Australia.

When the Dutch began visiting and mapping Australia in the 17th century, they called the continent New Holland. The name Australia was popularised by the explorer Matthew Flinders, who circumnavigated the continent in 1803. However, when his account of his voyage was published in 1814, the name Terra Australis was used.

Governor of New South Wales Lachlan Macquarie officially recommended the name Australia to replace New Holland in December 1817. The British Admiralty adopted the name in 1824, and the British Parliament used it in legislation in 1828. The United Kingdom Hydrographic Office used the new name in The Australia Directory of 1830. The name "Commonwealth of Australia" for the new federation of the six former colonies was formalised in the Commonwealth of Australia Constitution Act 1900 (UK).

Colloquial names for Australia include "Oz", "Straya" and "Down Under".

== History ==
=== Indigenous prehistory ===
Indigenous Australians comprise two broad groups:

- Aboriginal Australians, who are the various Indigenous peoples of the Australian mainland and many of its islands, including Tasmania
- Torres Strait Islanders, who are a distinct Melanesian people of Torres Strait Islands

Human habitation of the Australian continent is estimated to have begun 50,000 to 65,000 years ago, with the migration of people by land bridges and short sea crossings from what is now Southeast Asia. It is uncertain how many waves of immigration may have contributed to these ancestors of modern Aboriginal Australians. The Madjedbebe rock shelter in Arnhem Land is possibly the oldest site showing the presence of humans in Australia. The oldest human remains found are the Lake Mungo remains, which have been dated to approximately 42,000 years ago.

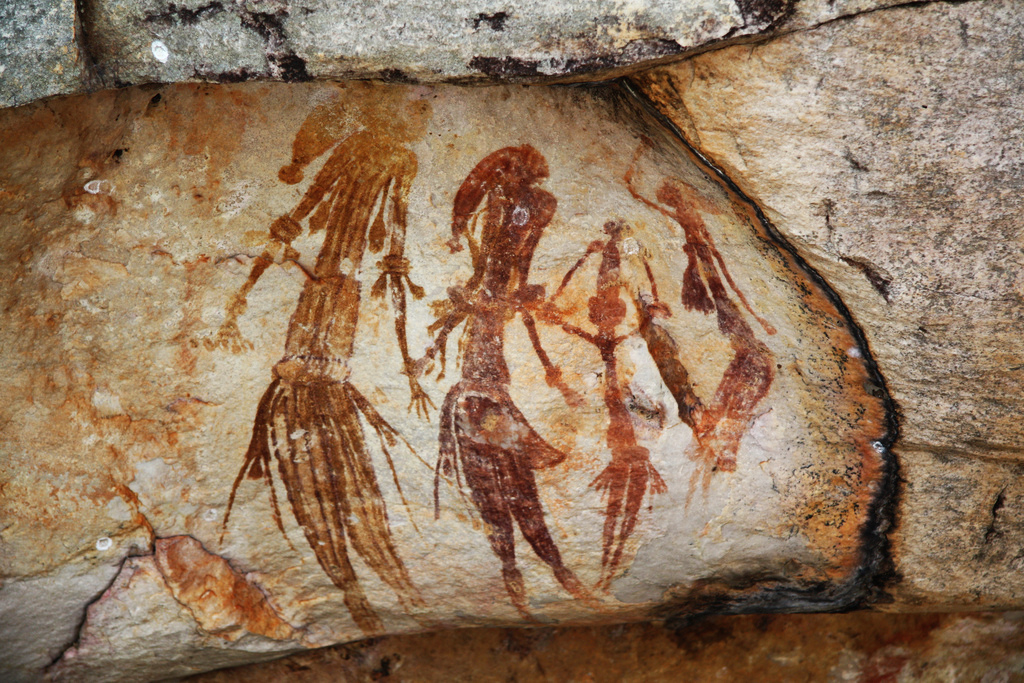
Aboriginal rock art in the Kimberley region of Western Australia

Aboriginal Australian culture is one of the oldest continuous cultures on Earth. At the time of first European contact, Aboriginal Australians belonged to wide range of societies, with diverse economies spread across at least 250 different language groups. Estimates of the Aboriginal population before British settlement range from 300,000 to 3 million. Aboriginal Australians cultures were (and remain) deeply connected with the land and the environment, with stories of The Dreaming maintained through oral tradition, songs, dance and paintings. Certain groups engaged in fire-stick farming, fish farming, and built semi-permanent shelters. These practices have variously been characterised as "hunter-gatherer", "agricultural", "natural cultivation" and "intensification".

Torres Strait Islander people first settled their islands at least 2,500 years ago. Culturally and linguistically distinct from mainland Aboriginal peoples, they were seafarers and obtained their livelihood from seasonal horticulture and the resources of their reefs and seas. Agriculture also developed on some islands and villages appeared by the 1300s. By the mid-18th century in northern Australia, contact, trade and cross-cultural engagement had been established between local Aboriginal groups and Makassan trepangers, visiting from present-day Indonesia.

=== European exploration and colonisation ===
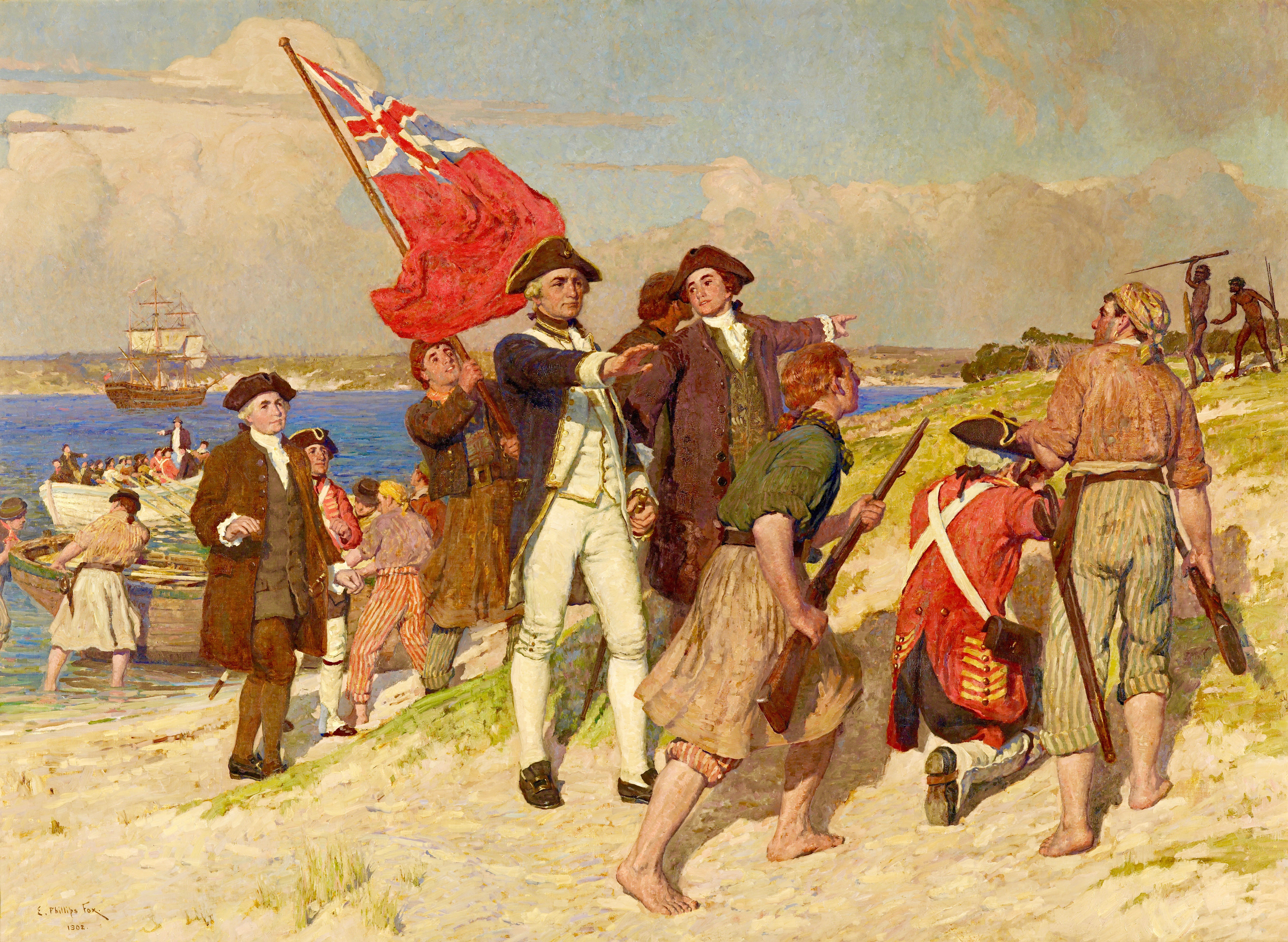
Landing of James Cook at Botany Bay on 29 April 1770

In 1606 the crew of the Dutch ship, Duyfken, captained by Willem Janszoon, made the first documented European landing in Australia and contact with Aboriginal Australians. Later that year, Luís Vaz de Torres sailed to the north of Australia through Torres Strait, along New Guinea's southern coast. Abel Tasman's voyage of 1642 was the first known European expedition to reach Van Diemen's Land. On his second voyage of 1644, he mapped the north coast of Australia south of New Guinea. Following Tasman's voyages, the Dutch were able to make almost complete maps of Australia's northern and western coasts and much of its southern and south-eastern Tasmanian coasts. They named the continent New Holland.

In 1770, Captain James Cook sailed along and mapped the east coast, which he named "New South Wales" and claimed for Great Britain. In 1786, the British government announced its intention to establish a penal colony in New South Wales. On 26 January 1788, the First Fleet commanded by Captain Arthur Phillip, arrived at Sydney Cove, Port Jackson. A camp was established and the Union Flag raised and the date later became Australia's national day.

Most early settlers were convicts, transported for petty crimes and assigned as labourers or servants to "free settlers" (willing immigrants). Once emancipated, convicts tended to integrate into colonial society. Aboriginal resistance, convict rebellions and bushranging were sometimes suppressed under martial law. The 1808 Rum Rebellion, carried out by officers of the New South Wales Corp, led to a temporary military junta. During the next two decades, social and economic reforms, together with the establishment of a Legislative Council and Supreme Court, saw the penal colony transition to a civil society.

The indigenous population declined for 150 years following European settlement, mainly due to infectious disease. British colonial authorities did not sign any treaties with Aboriginal groups. As settlement expanded, tens of thousands of Indigenous people and thousands of settlers were killed in frontier conflicts, which many historians argue included acts of genocide by settlers. Settlers dispossessed surviving Indigenous peoples of most of their land.

=== Colonial expansion ===
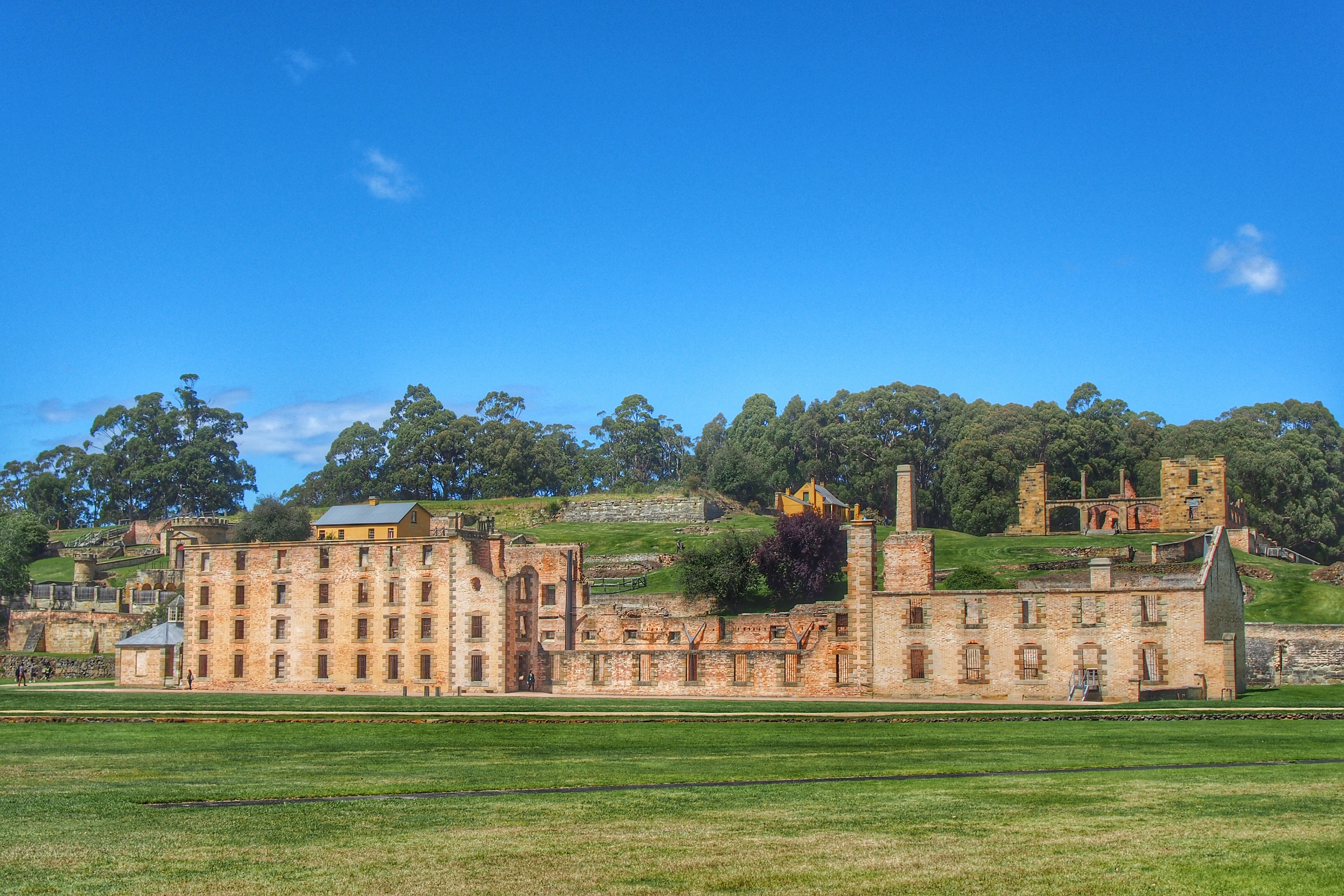
Tasmania's Port Arthur penal settlement is one of eleven UNESCO World Heritage-listed Australian Convict Sites.

In 1803, a settlement was established in Van Diemen's Land (present-day Tasmania), and in 1813, Gregory Blaxland, William Lawson and William Wentworth crossed the Blue Mountains west of Sydney, opening the interior to European settlement. The British claim was extended to the whole Australian continent in 1827 when Major Edmund Lockyer established a settlement on King George Sound (modern-day Albany). The Swan River Colony (present-day Perth) was established in 1829, evolving into the largest Australian colony by area, Western Australia. Separate colonies were carved from New South Wales: Tasmania in 1825, South Australia in 1836, Victoria in 1851, and Queensland in 1859. South Australia and Victoria were founded as free colonies – they never accepted transported convicts. Growing opposition to the convict system culminated in its abolition in the eastern colonies by the 1850s. Initially a free colony, Western Australia accepted convicts from 1850 to 1868.

The six colonies individually gained responsible government between 1855 and 1890, managing most of their own affairs while remaining part of the British Empire. The Colonial Office in London retained control of some matters, notably foreign affairs. The colonial parliaments progressively extended voting rights to adult men from 1856, with women's suffrage on equal terms following between the 1890s and 1900s. Some colonies introduced racial restrictions on voting from 1885.

In the mid-19th century, explorers such as Burke and Wills charted Australia's interior. A series of gold rushes beginning in the early 1850s led to an influx of new migrants from China, North America and continental Europe, as well as outbreaks of bushranging and civil unrest; the latter peaked in 1854 when Ballarat miners launched the Eureka Rebellion against gold licence fees. The 1860s saw the rise of blackbirding, where South Sea Islanders were coerced or abducted into indentured labour, mainly by Queensland colonists.

From 1886, Australian colonial governments began removing many Aboriginal children from their families and communities, justified on the grounds of child protection and forced assimilation policies. The Second Boer War (1899–1902) marked the largest overseas deployment of Australia's colonial forces.

=== Federation to the World Wars ===
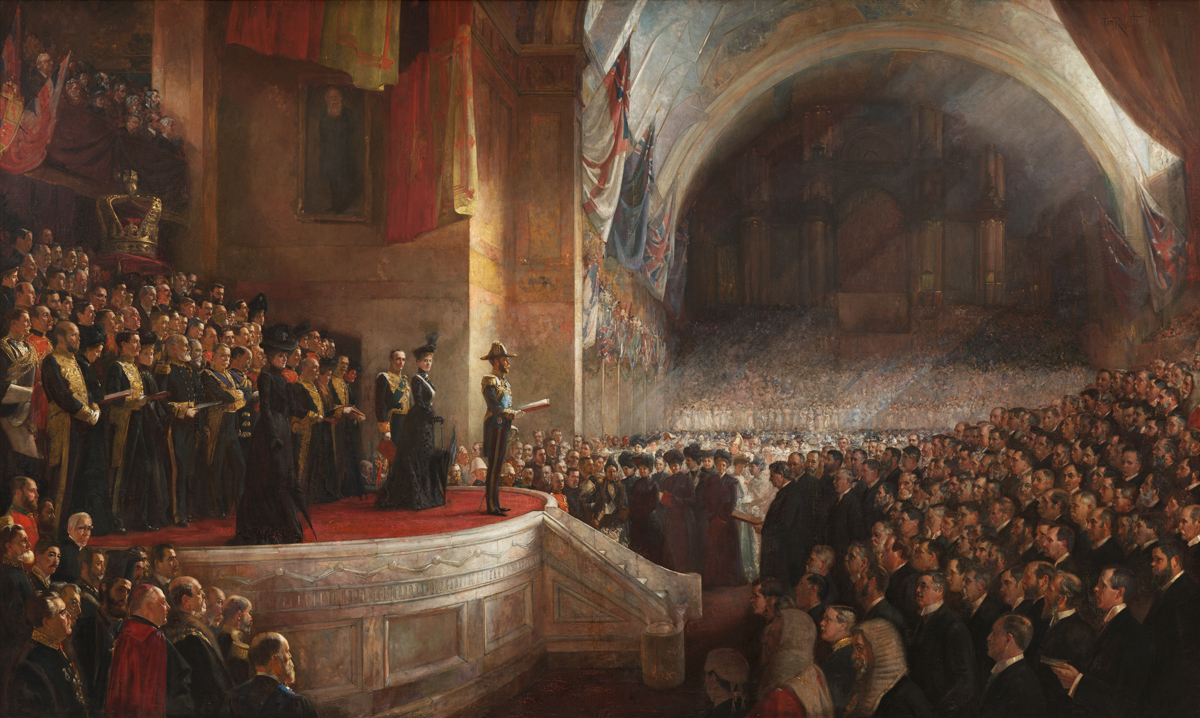
The Big Picture, a painting by Tom Roberts, depicts the opening of the first Australian Parliament in 1901.

On 1 January 1901, federation of the colonies was achieved after a decade of planning, constitutional conventions and referendums, resulting in the establishment of the Commonwealth of Australia as a nation under the new Australian Constitution.

From 1901, Australia was a self-governing dominion within the British Empire. It was one of the founding members of the League of Nations in 1920, and the United Nations in 1945. The Statute of Westminster 1931 ended the ability of the UK to legislate for Australia at the federal level without Australia's consent. Australia adopted it in 1942, but it was backdated to 1939 to confirm the validity of legislation passed during World War II.

The Australian Capital Territory was formed in 1911 as the location for the future federal capital of Canberra. While it was being constructed, Melbourne served as the temporary capital from 1901 to 1927. The Northern Territory was transferred from South Australia to the Commonwealth in 1911. Australia took over the administration of the Territory of Papua (previously British New Guinea) in 1905 and of the Territory of New Guinea (formerly German New Guinea) in 1920. The two were unified as the Territory of Papua and New Guinea in 1949 and gained independence from Australia in 1975.

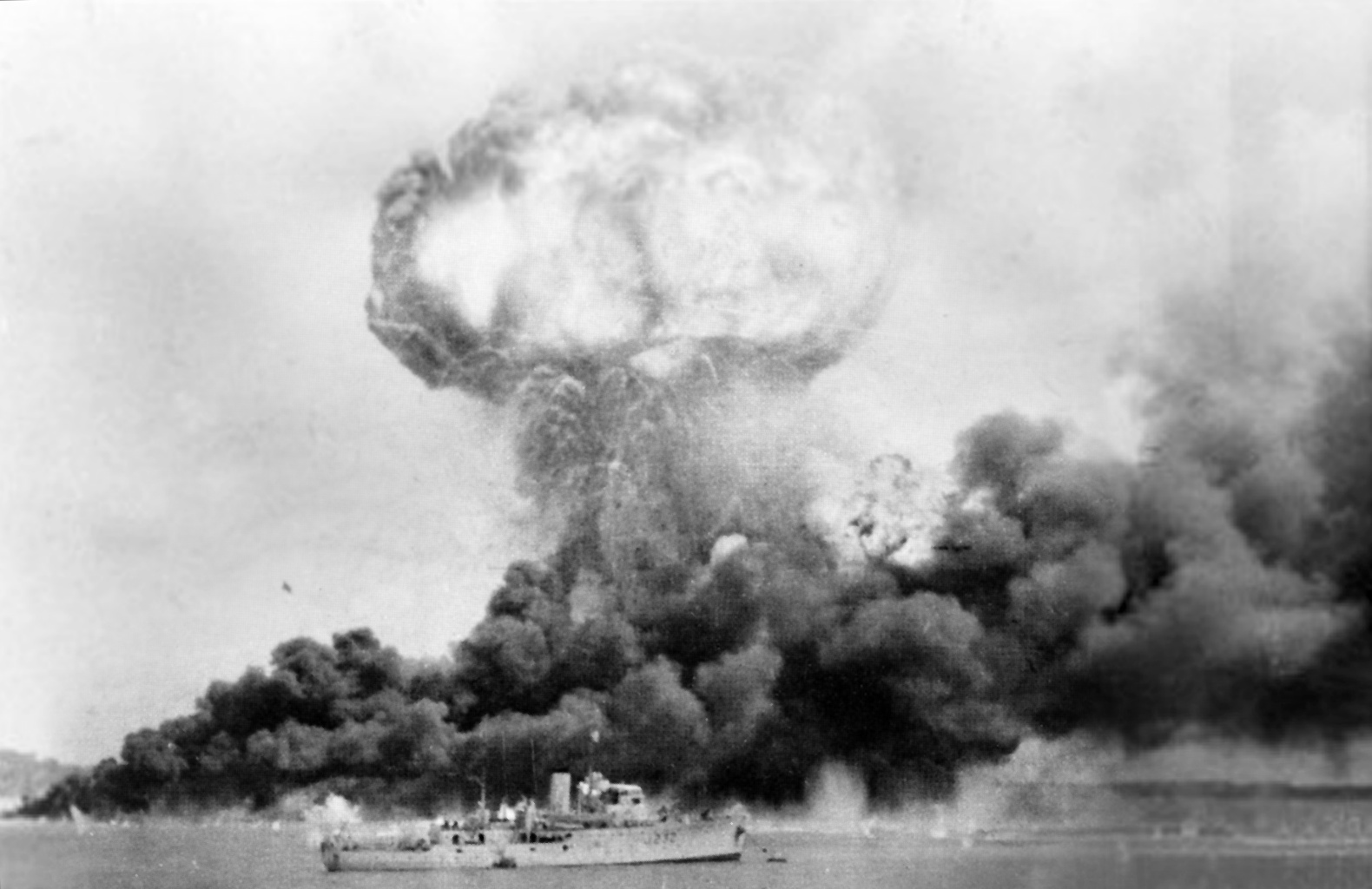
The 1942 Bombing of Darwin, the first of more than 100 Japanese air raids on Australia during World War II

In 1914, Australia joined the Allies in the First World War, and took part in the fighting on several fronts. Of the 324,000 men who served overseas, about 60,000 were killed and another 152,000 were wounded. Many Australians regard the defeat of the Australian and New Zealand Army Corps (ANZAC) at Gallipoli in 1915 as the "baptism of fire" that forged the new nation's identity. The beginning of the campaign is commemorated annually on Anzac Day, a date which rivals Australia Day as the nation's most important.

From 1939 to 1945, Australia joined the Allies in fighting the Second World War. Australia's armed forces fought in the Pacific, European and Mediterranean and Middle East theatres. The shock of Britain's defeat in Singapore in 1942, followed soon after by the bombing of Darwin and other Japanese attacks on Australian soil, led to a widespread belief in Australia that a Japanese invasion was imminent, and a shift from the United Kingdom to the United States as Australia's principal ally and security partner. Since 1951, Australia has maintained a mutual security alliance with the United States under the ANZUS treaty.

=== Post-war and contemporary eras ===
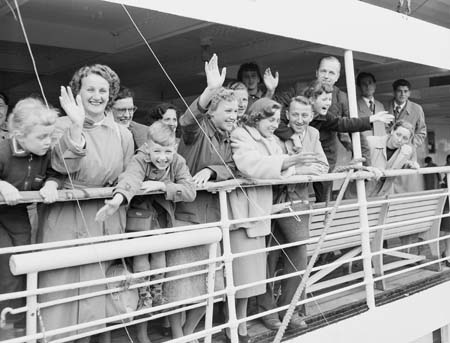
Postwar migrants from Europe arriving in Australia in 1954

In the three decades following World War II, Australia experienced significant increases in living standards, leisure time and suburban development. Governments encouraged a large wave of immigration from across Europe and called these migrants "New Australians". High immigration was justified to Australians using the slogan "populate or perish", and from the 1960s the White Australia policy was gradually relaxed.

A member of the Western Bloc during the Cold War, Australia participated in the Korean War and the Malayan Emergency during the 1950s and the Vietnam War from 1962 to 1973. Tensions over communist influence in society led to unsuccessful attempts by the Menzies Government to ban the Communist Party of Australia, and a bitter split in the Labor Party in 1955.

As a result of a 1967 referendum, the federal government gained the power to legislate with regard to Aboriginal Australians, and Aboriginal Australians were fully included in the census. Pre-colonial land interests (referred to as native title in Australia) were recognised in law for the first time when the High Court of Australia held in Mabo v Queensland (No 2) that Australia was not terra nullius ('land belonging to no one') at the time of European settlement.

Following the abolition of the last vestiges of the White Australia policy in 1973, Australia's demography and culture transformed as a result of a large and ongoing wave of non-European immigration, mostly from Asia. During the late 20th century, Australia increased its foreign policy ties within the Asia–Pacific region. The Australia Acts of 1986 severed the remaining constitutional ties between Australia and the United Kingdom while maintaining the monarch in her independent capacity as Queen of Australia. In a 1999 constitutional referendum, 55% of voters rejected abolishing the monarchy and becoming a republic.

Following the September 11 attacks in the United States, Australia joined the United States in fighting the Afghanistan War from 2001 to 2021 and the Iraq War from 2003 to 2009. The nation's trade relations also became increasingly oriented towards East Asia in the 21st century, with China becoming the nation's largest trading partner by a large margin.

In response to the COVID-19 pandemic, from March 2020 lockdowns and other restrictions on public gatherings and movement across the national and state borders were implemented by the Federal, state and territory governments. Following the rollout of vaccines in 2021, these restrictions were gradually eased. In October 2023, Australia declared that COVID-19 was no longer a communicable disease incident of national significance.

== Geography ==
=== General characteristics ===
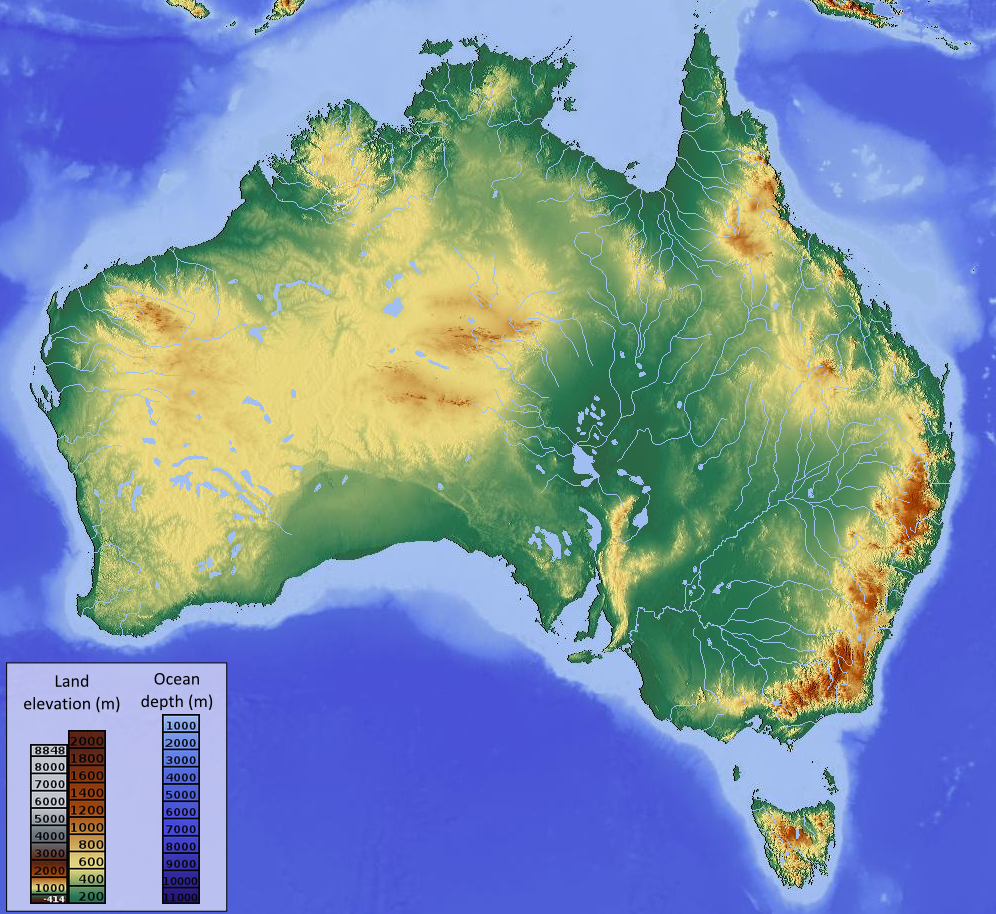
Topographic map of Australia. Dark green represents the lowest elevation and dark brown the highest.

Australia consists of the mainland Australian continent, the island of Tasmania, numerous smaller offshore islands, and the remote offshore territories of Ashmore and Cartier Islands, Christmas Island, Cocos (Keeling) Islands, Coral Sea Islands, Heard and McDonald Islands, and Norfolk Island. Australia also claims about 42% of Antarctica as the Australian Antarctic Territory, but this claim is only recognised by four other countries.

Mainland Australia lies between latitudes 9° and 44° south, and longitudes 112° and 154° east. Surrounded by the Indian and Pacific oceans, Australia is separated from Asia by the Arafura and Timor seas, with the Coral Sea lying off the Queensland coast, and the Tasman Sea lying between Australia and New Zealand. The Great Barrier Reef, the world's largest coral reef, lies a short distance off the north-east coast and extends for more than 2,300 km (1,400 mi).

The mainland is the world's smallest continent and the country is the sixth-largest by total area. Australia is sometimes considered the world's largest island and is often dubbed the "island continent". It has 35,877 km (22,293 mi) of coastline (excluding all offshore islands), and claims an exclusive economic zone of 8,148,250 square kilometres (3,146,060 sq mi). This exclusive economic zone does not include the Australian Antarctic Territory.

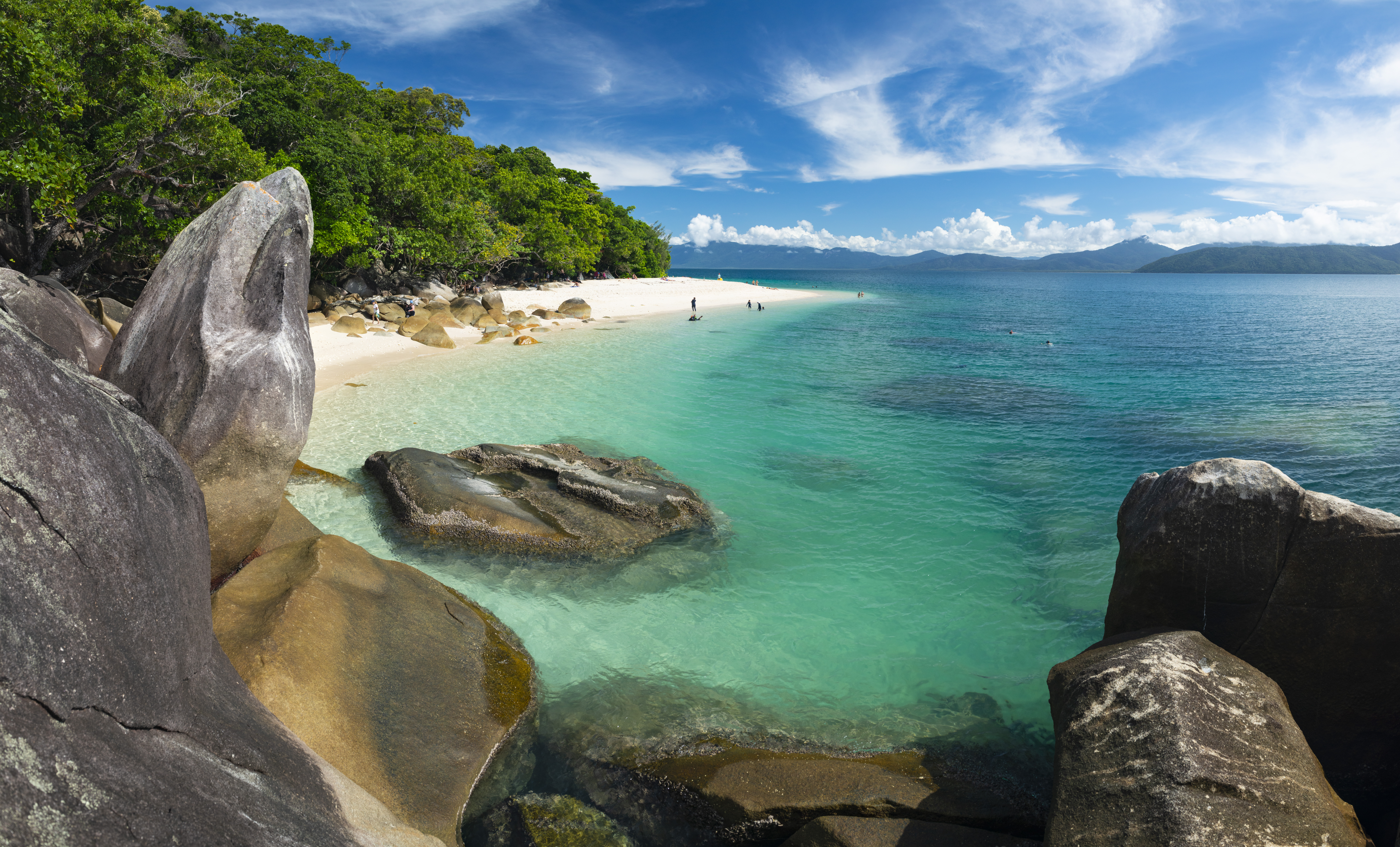
Fitzroy Island, one of the 600 islands within the main archipelago of the Great Barrier Reef

About 70% of Australia's landmass is arid or semi-arid. In 2021, Australia had 10% of the global permanent meadows and pastureland. Forest cover is about 17% of Australia's land area. The Australian mainland is relatively flat, with an average height of 325 metres (1,066 ft) compared with 870 metres (2,850 ft) for all continents. The Great Dividing Range runs along most of eastern Australia, dividing the central lowlands from the eastern highlands. At 2,228 m (7,310 ft), Mount Kosciuszko is the highest mountain on the mainland. Taller are Mawson Peak, at 2,745 m (9,006 ft), on Heard Island, and, in the Australian Antarctic Territory, Mount McClintock and Mount Menzies, at 3,492 m (11,457 ft) and 3,355 m (11,007 ft) respectively.

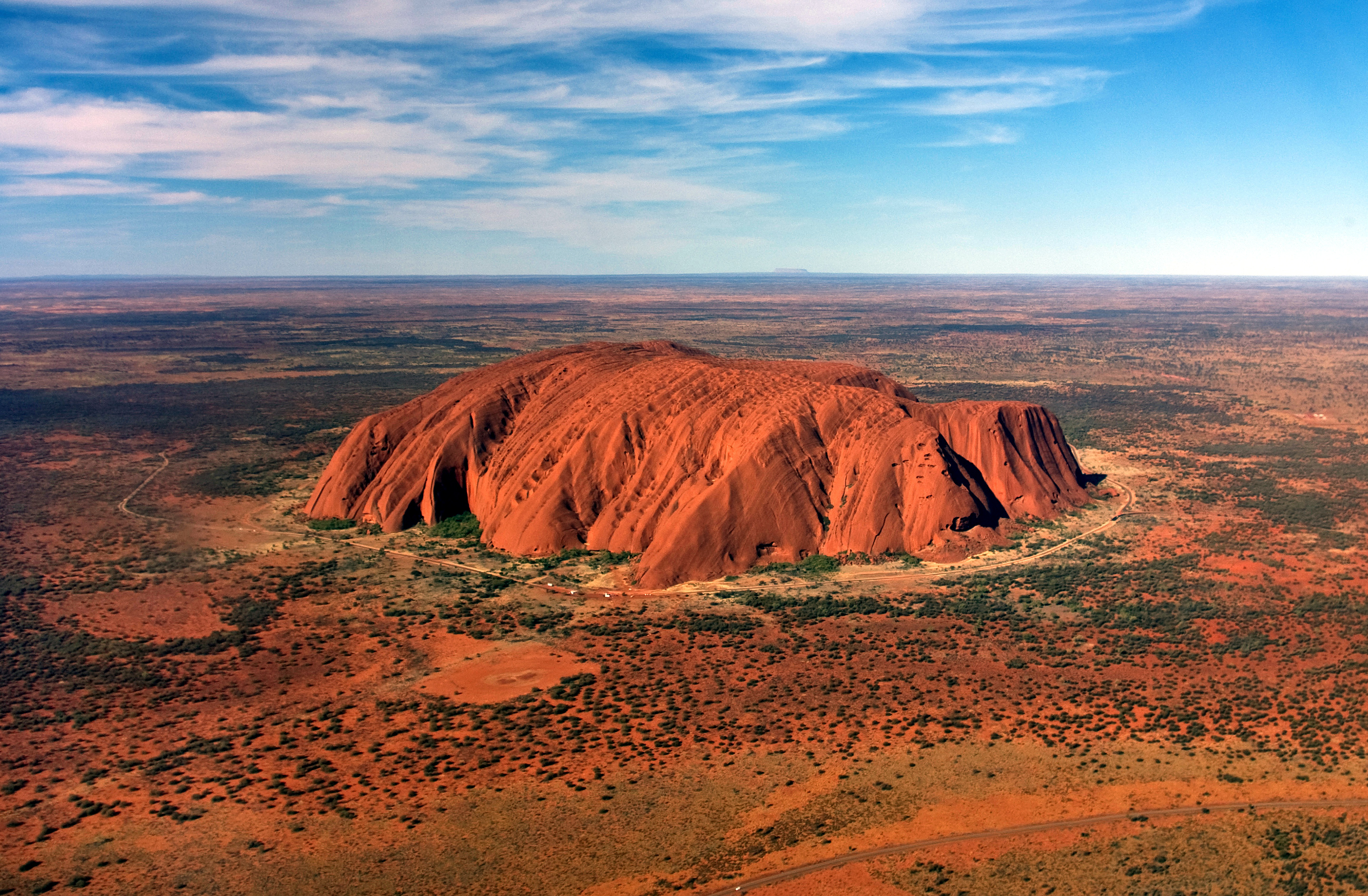
Uluru in the semi-arid region of Central Australia

The Murray-Darling is Australia's major river system, draining most of inland New South Wales and Southern Queensland towards Lake Alexandrina and the sea in South Australia. There are also smaller coastal river systems, inland drainage systems such as the Lake Eyre system, and salt lake systems in central and western Australia. Australia's rivers have the lowest discharge into the sea of any continent. The mainland's flat, arid profile also makes its rivers slow-moving, resulting in a build up of salt on the land. Salinisation adversely affects Australia's soil which is, on average, poor in nutrients compared with world standards.

Australia's population is concentrated on the coastal fringes. About 95% of the population lives within 100 km of the coast; the world average is 39%. Australia's population density is 3.5 inhabitants per square kilometre, which is one of the lowest in the world. However, there is a large concentration of the population in cities along the temperate south-eastern coastline, and population density exceeds 38 inhabitants per square kilometre in central Melbourne.

=== Geology ===
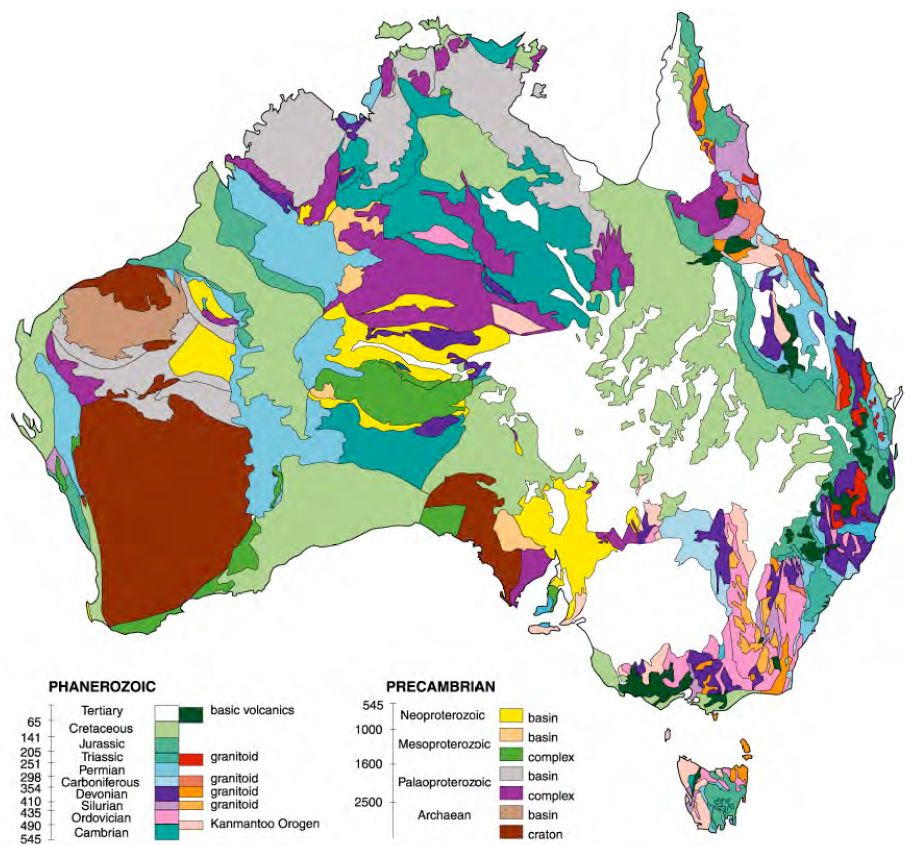
Basic geological regions of Australia (by age)

Formerly part of the Rodinia and Gondwana supercontinents, Australia completely separated from Antarctica about 35 million years ago and continued drifting northwards. When the Last Glacial Period ended, rising sea levels separated the Australian mainland from New Guinea about 8,000 years ago and from Tasmania about 6,000 years ago.

Australia lies well within the Australian tectonic plate. The mainland is relatively stable geologically, with no major mountain building, active volcanoes or tectonic faults. However, the Australian plate is moving north-northeast at a rate of about 6 to 7 cm a year and is in collision with the Eurasian plate and Pacific plate. The resulting intratectonic stresses lead to relatively high seismic activity for a geologically stable landmass. There were 18 earthquakes with a moment magnitude of greater than 6 between 1901 and 2017. The Newcastle earthquake of 1989 was Australia's deadliest, killing 13 people. There were active volcanoes on the eastern mainland as recently as 4,600 years ago, and this is reflected in Aboriginal place names and creation stories. Currently, volcanism occurs in the remote Heard Island and McDonald Islands.

The Australian continental crust was created in three cycles from the oldest Archaean cratons in the west to the younger orogenic formations in the east (built about 541 million to 252 million years ago). The oldest Australian surface rocks date to the Archaean period. Some in Western Australia are older than 3.7 billion years and others in South Australia are over 3.1 billion years old. The oldest zircon crystals on Earth, dating back 4.4 billion years, have been found in Western Australia. However, about 80% of Australia is covered by sedimentary rocks and regolith that are less than 250 million years old.

=== Climate ===
Köppen climate types of Australia

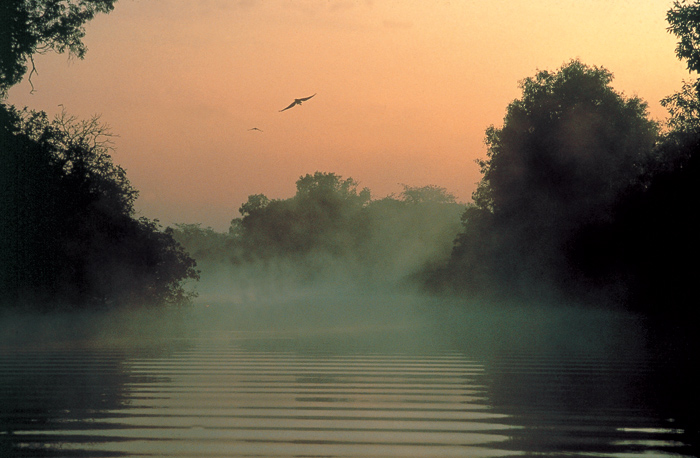
A billabong in the Kakadu National Park, Northern Territory. The monsoon climate of northern Australia is hot and humid in summer.

The Australian climate ranges from wet tropical in the northeast and northwest to arid in the centre. The coastal south is temperate and humid with winter freezing and snow in the southeastern highlands and Tasmania. The climate is influenced by Australia's position in the "horse latitudes", which tends to bring arid conditions. Overall, the Australian mainland is the driest inhabited continent, with an average annual rainfall of 470 millimetres (19 in). About 70% of the country is arid or semi-arid, and about 18% is desert.

The climate is also influenced by various systems such as the El Niño–Southern Oscillation, the Indian Ocean Dipole and the Southern Annular Mode. Australia has unusual variability in rainfall within years and between years, leading to frequent droughts and flooding. Cyclones and rain depressions are common in tropical Australia. The summer monsoon brings significant rainfall to northern Australia, while low pressure systems bring winter rainfall in the south. The hottest regions are in the northwest of the country and the coolest in the southeast. Bushfire conditions are common in southern Australia.

Climate change from increased greenhouse gas emissions has led to a 1.5 °C rise in Australian temperatures since 1910 and an increase in extreme heat and heavy rainfall events. There has been a reduction in rainfall from April to October in southern Australia since 1970 and a longer bushfire season since the 1950s. Rainfall has increased in northern Australia since the 1970s. The number of tropical cyclones has fallen since 1982 and alpine snow has decreased since the late 1950s. Sea levels are rising around Australia and the surrounding oceans are becoming more acidic.

=== Biodiversity ===
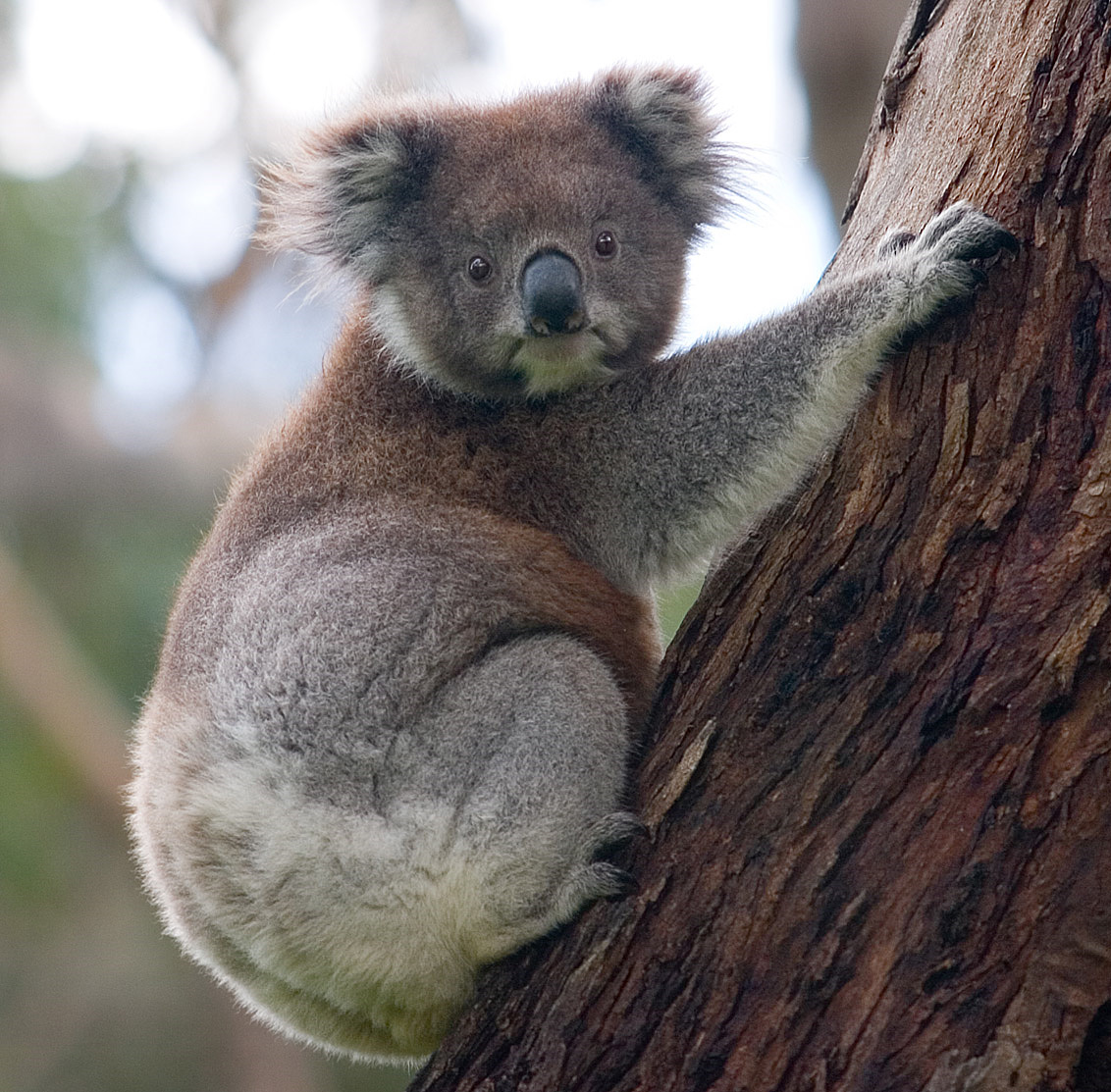
Koala and Eucalyptus

Australia is one of 17 megadiverse countries. Because of its long geographic isolation, much of Australia's biota is unique. About 94% of its amphibians, 93% of its reptiles and flowering plants, 69% of its mammals and 46% of its birds are endemic. Australia has a wide range of ecosystems of which 89 regions and 419 subregions are recognised in the Australian bioregion framework.

In January 2025, there were 168,386 named species on the Australian National Species List. However, it is estimated that 70% of Australian species have not been discovered and classified and that there may be 600,000 Australian native species. In general, knowledge of vertebrates and flowering plants is better than for invertebrates and fungi. It is estimated that less than 10% of Australia's fungi and insects have been named.

About 10% of the world's known plant species are found in Australia. Many of these have adapted to the arid climate, variable rainfall and nutrient-poor soil. Deserts and xeric shrubland cover about 70% of the mainland. Acacia, banksia and eucalypts have spread over much of Australia. Many plants have hard and long-living leaves, and are rich in carbon, poor in nutrients, and well adapted to bushfires.

About two-thirds of the world's 330 species of marsupials are native to Australia. Australian placental mammals (overwhelmingly bats, rats and mice) also make up almost 47% of the world's land mammal species. Australia has about 10% of the world's known reptile species. There are also about 320,500 invertebrate species, of which insects are the largest class, accounting for more than 75% of all animal species. Australia has over 15,000 known species of fungi, although it is possible that tens of thousands more exist.

Australia's wildlife show many adaptations to their environments. As the leaves of most plants are poor in nutrients, Australia has a high proportion of birds, insects and marsupials, such as the honey possum, that feed on nectar and pollen. The koala is an exception, specialising in feeding on eucalyptus leaves. Nutritionally poor flora and variable rainfall also favour animals with lower energy requirements, including snakes, lizards, and hopping marsupials such as the kangaroo and wallaby. There is, however, evidence of convergent evolution of Australia's marsupials and the placental mammals of other continents living in similar environments. For example, the extinct thylacine (Tasmanian tiger) had similarities with the placental wolf, marsupial moles with the golden moles of Africa, and hopping mice with the hopping rodents of other arid regions.

There were major extinctions of Australia's vertebrates, including its megafauna, about 46 thousand years ago, and there is an ongoing scientific debate over the role of human activity and climate change in these extinctions. The contraction of the range of the Tasmanian tiger and Tasmanian devil to that island about 4,000 to 5,000 years ago is also consistent with changes on the mainland including an increasing human population, the introduction of the dingo, and the greater use of fire and new stone tool technologies.

Over the past two centuries, Australia has lost more mammal species than any other continent. Overall, 100 Australian species are listed as extinct or extinct in the wild. In June 2021, over 1,000 animal and plant species were listed by Australian governments as endangered or critically endangered. The major threats to endangered species are landscape change, ecosystem disruption, introduced species such as the feral cat and red fox, and climate change.

The federal Environment Protection and Biodiversity Conservation Act 1999 is the legal framework for the protection of threatened species. The National Reserve System is Australia's network of protected areas. As at 30 June 2022, it covered over 22% of Australia's land mass. Australia's Strategy for Nature 2024–2030 is the national biodiversity plan that aims to reverse biodiversity loss in Australia by 2030 and meet the country's obligations under the United Nations Convention on Biological Diversity and other international agreements.

== Government and politics ==
Charles III
King of Australia

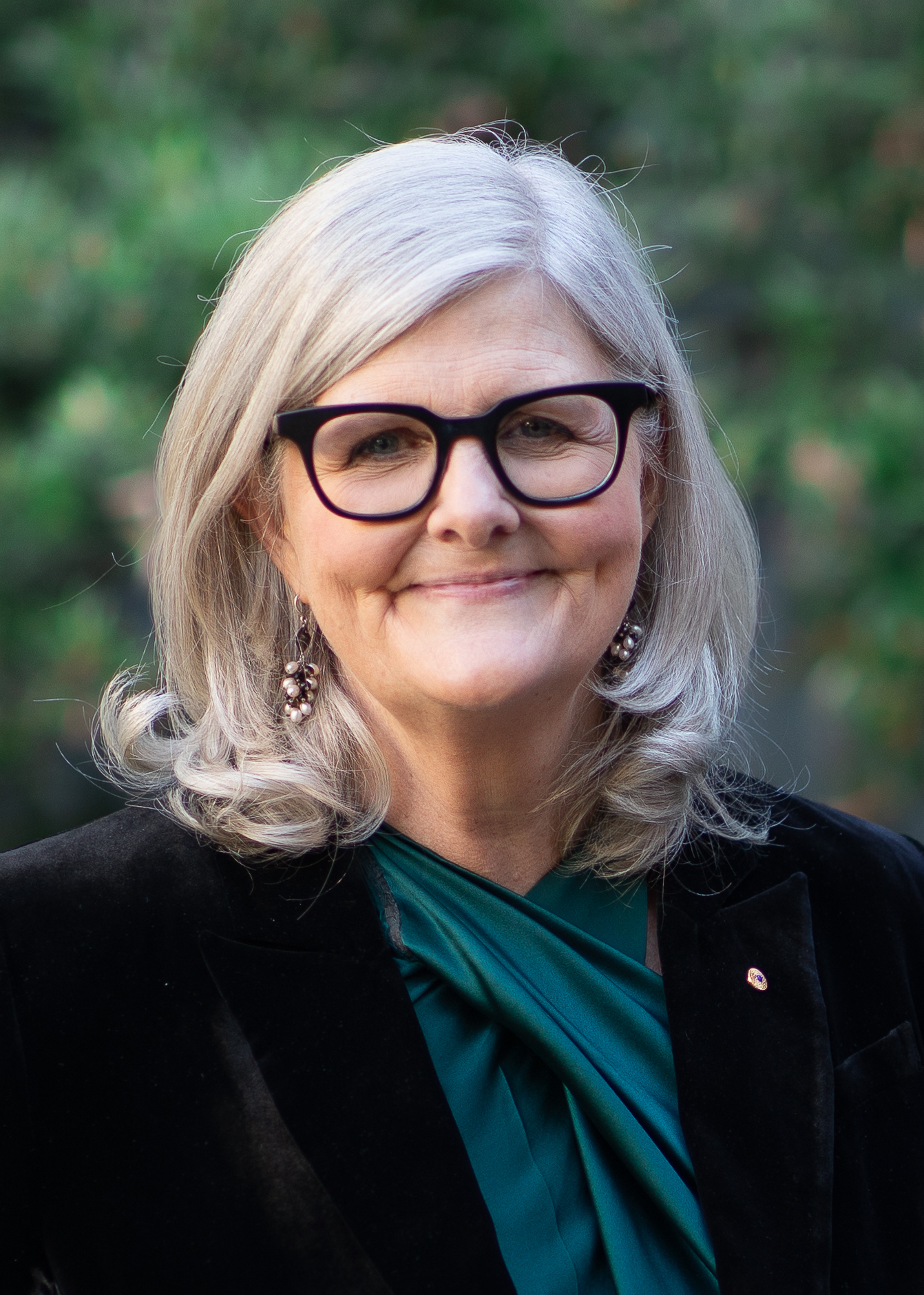
Sam Mostyn
Governor-General

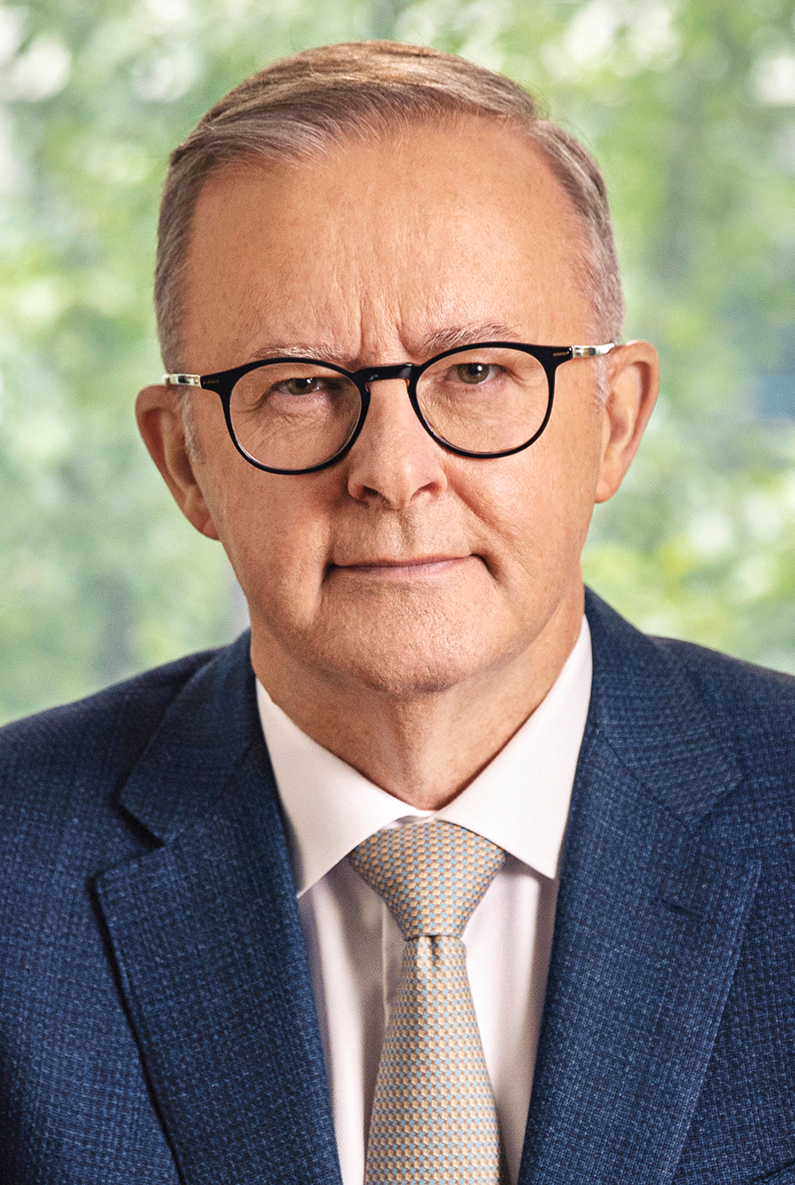
Anthony Albanese
Prime Minister

Australia is a constitutional monarchy, a parliamentary democracy and a federation. The country has maintained its mostly unchanged constitution alongside a stable liberal democratic political system since Federation in 1901. It is one of the world's oldest federations, in which power is divided between the federal and state governments. The Australian system of government combines elements derived from the political systems of the United Kingdom (a fused executive, constitutional monarchy and strong party discipline) and the United States (federalism, a written constitution and strong bicameralism with a Senate in which states have equal representation), resulting in a distinct hybrid.

Federal government power is partially separated between three groups:

- Legislature: the bicameral Parliament, comprising the monarch, the Senate, and the House of Representatives
- Executive: the Australian Government, led by the prime minister (the leader of the party or coalition with a majority in the House of Representatives), their chosen Cabinet and other ministers; formally appointed by the governor-general
- Judiciary: the High Court and other federal courts

Following elections on 3 May 2025, the prime minister is Anthony Albanese of the Australian Labor Party. Charles III reigns as King of Australia and is represented in Australia by the governor-general at the federal level and by the governors at the state level, who by section 63 of the Constitution and convention act on the advice of their ministers. Thus, in practice the governor-general acts as a legal figurehead for the actions of the prime minister and the Cabinet. The governor-general may in some situations exercise reserve powers: powers exercisable in the absence of, or contrary to, ministerial advice. When these powers may be exercised is governed by convention and their precise scope is unclear. The most notable exercise of these powers was the dismissal of the Whitlam government in the constitutional crisis of 1975.

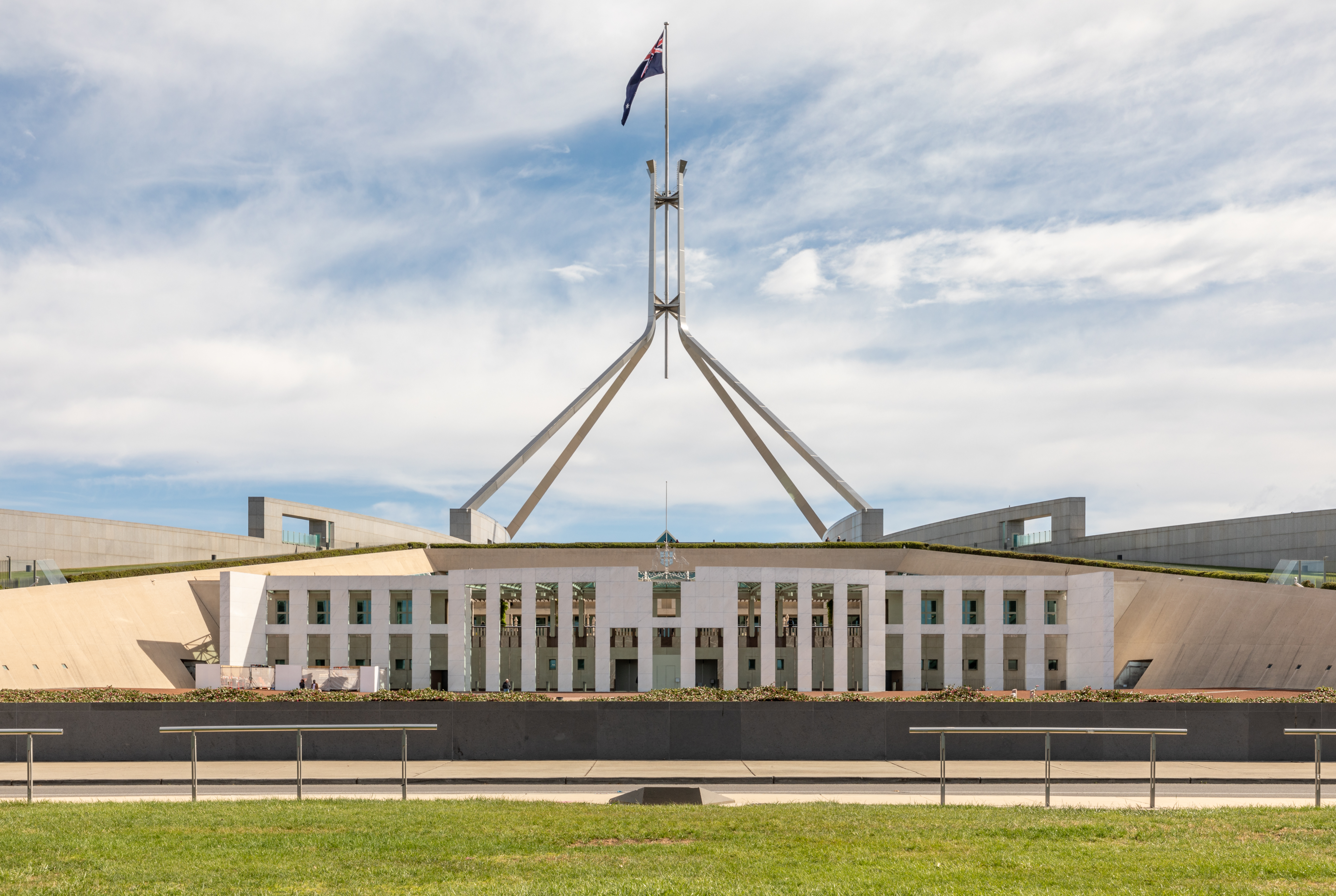
Parliament House, Canberra, Australian Capital Territory

In the Senate (the upper house), there are 76 senators: twelve each from the states and two each from the mainland territories (the Australian Capital Territory and the Northern Territory). The House of Representatives (the lower house) has 150 members elected from single-member electoral divisions, commonly known as "electorates" or "seats", allocated to states on the basis of population, with each of the current states guaranteed a minimum of five seats. The lower house has a maximum term of three years, but this is not fixed and governments usually dissolve the house early for an election at some point in the 6 months before the maximum. Elections for both chambers are generally held simultaneously with senators having overlapping six-year terms except for those from the territories, whose terms are not fixed but are tied to the electoral cycle for the lower house. Thus, only 40 of the 76 places in the Senate are put to each election unless the cycle is interrupted by a double dissolution.

=== Elections ===
Australia's electoral system uses preferential voting for the House of Representatives and all state and territory lower house elections (with the exception of Tasmania and the ACT which use the Hare-Clark system). The Senate and most state upper houses use the proportional system which combines preferential voting with proportional representation for each state. Voting and enrolment is compulsory for all enrolled citizens 18 years and older in every jurisdiction. The party with majority support in the House of Representatives forms the government and its leader becomes prime minister. The governor-general appoints the prime minister and may dismiss one who has lost the confidence of parliament or acts illegally. As Australia is a Westminster parliamentary democracy with a powerful and elected upper house, its system has sometimes been called a "Washminster mutation", or semi-parliamentary.

There are two major political groups that have usually formed government federally: the Australian Labor Party and the Coalition which is a grouping of the Liberal Party and its minor partner, the National Party. At the state level of government, the relationship between the Nationals and the Liberal Party differs, with the parties merged in Queensland and the Northern Territory (federal parliamentarians, however, sit in either the Liberal or National party room); in coalition in New South Wales, Victoria and Western Australia; and in competition with the Liberals in South Australia and Tasmania. Within Australian political culture, the Labor Party is considered centre-left and the Coalition is considered centre-right. Independent members and several minor parties have achieved representation in Australian parliaments, mostly in upper houses. The Australian Greens have been the third largest party by both vote and membership since 2004.

=== States and territories ===
Australia's states and territories

Australia has six states – New South Wales (NSW), Victoria (Vic), Queensland (Qld), Western Australia (WA), South Australia (SA) and Tasmania (Tas) – and two mainland self-governing territories – the Australian Capital Territory (ACT) and the Northern Territory (NT).

The states have the general power to make laws except in the few areas where the constitution grants the Commonwealth (the federal level of government) exclusive powers. The Commonwealth can only make laws on topics listed in the constitution but its laws prevail over those of the states to the extent of any inconsistency. Since Federation, the Commonwealth's power relative to the states has significantly increased due to the increasingly wide interpretation given to listed Commonwealth powers – and because of the states' heavy financial reliance on Commonwealth grants.

Each state and major mainland territory has its own parliament – unicameral in the Northern Territory, the ACT and Queensland, and bicameral in the other states. The lower houses are known as the Legislative Assembly (the House of Assembly in South Australia and Tasmania); the upper houses are known as the Legislative Council. The head of the government in each state is the premier and in each territory the chief minister. The King is represented in each state by a governor. At the Commonwealth level, the King's representative is the governor-general.

The Commonwealth government directly administers the internal Jervis Bay Territory and the external territories: the Ashmore and Cartier Islands, the Coral Sea Islands, the Heard Island and McDonald Islands, the Indian Ocean territories (Christmas Island and the Cocos (Keeling) Islands), Norfolk Island, (Note: Norfolk Island previously was self-governed, however this was revoked in 2015.) and the Australian Antarctic Territory. (Note: This Antarctic claim is recognised by only by New Zealand, the United Kingdom, France, and Norway.) The remote Macquarie Island and Lord Howe Island are part of Tasmania and New South Wales respectively.

=== Foreign relations ===
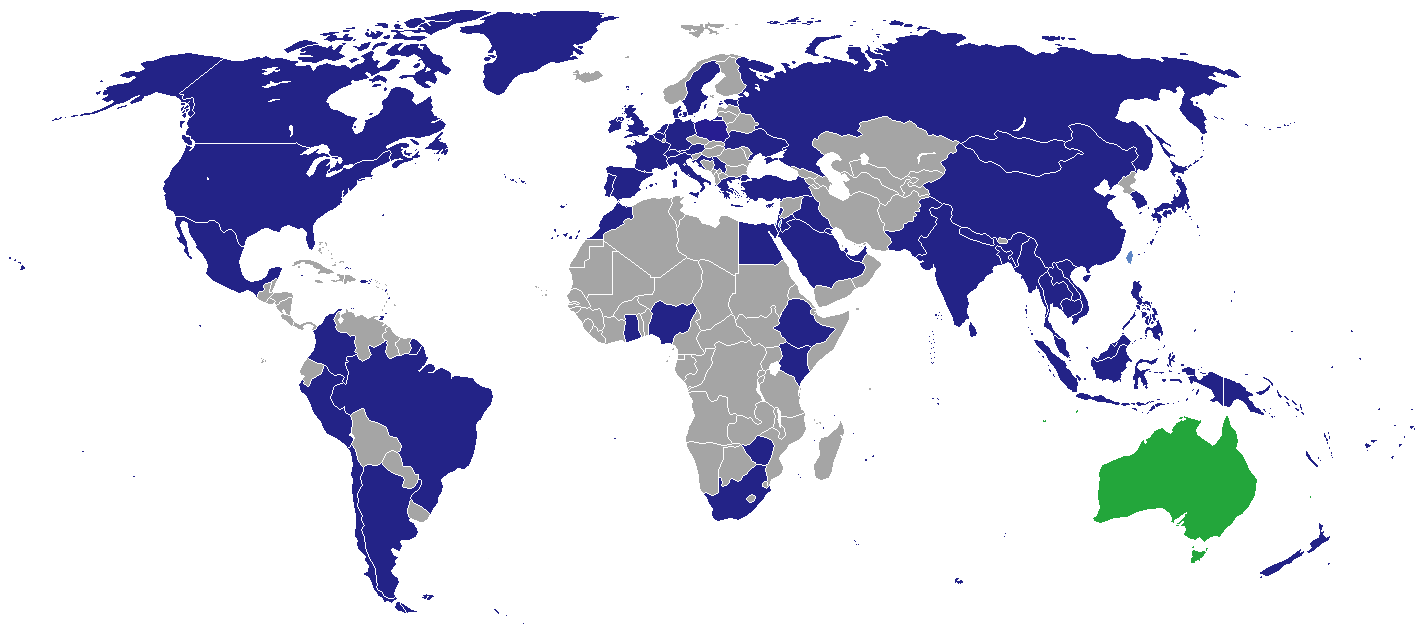
Diplomatic missions of Australia

Australia is a middle power, whose foreign relations has three core bi-partisan pillars: commitment to the US alliance, engagement with the Indo-Pacific and support for international institutions, rules and co-operation. Through the ANZUS pact and its status as a major non-NATO ally, Australia maintains a close relationship with the US, which encompasses strong defence, security and trade ties. In the Indo-Pacific, the country seeks to increase its trade ties through the open flow of trade and capital, while managing the rise of Chinese power by supporting the existing rules-based order. Regionally, the country is a member of the Pacific Islands Forum, the Pacific Community, the ASEAN+6 mechanism and the East Asia Summit. Internationally, the country is a member of the United Nations (of which it was a founding member), the Commonwealth of Nations, the OECD and the G20. This reflects the country's generally strong commitment to multilateralism.

Australia is a member of several defence, intelligence and security groupings including the Five Eyes intelligence alliance with the United States, United Kingdom, Canada and New Zealand; the ANZUS alliance with the United States and New Zealand; the AUKUS security treaty with the United States and United Kingdom; the Quadrilateral Security Dialogue with the United States, India and Japan; the Five Power Defence Arrangements with New Zealand, the United Kingdom, Malaysia and Singapore; and the Reciprocal Access defence and security agreement with Japan.

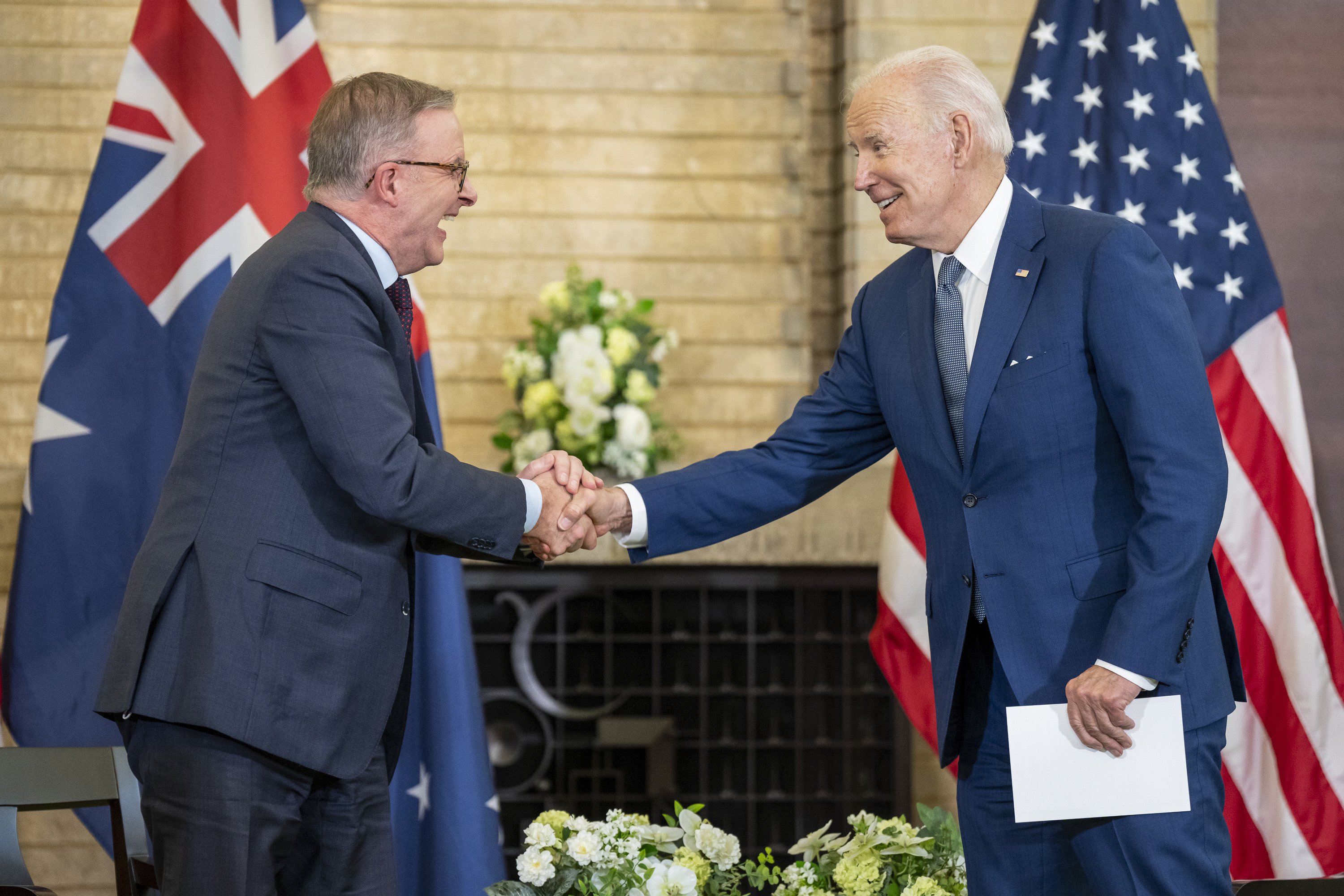
Australian Prime Minister Anthony Albanese with American President Joe Biden in 2022

Australia has pursued the cause of international trade liberalisation. It led the formation of the Cairns Group and Asia-Pacific Economic Cooperation, and is a member of the Organisation for Economic Co-operation and Development (OECD) and the World Trade Organization (WTO). Beginning in the 2000s, Australia entered into the Comprehensive and Progressive Agreement for Trans-Pacific Partnership and the Regional Comprehensive Economic Partnership multilateral free trade agreements as well as bilateral free trade agreements with the United States, China, Japan, South Korea, Indonesia, the United Kingdom and New Zealand, with the most recent deal signed in 2023 with the UK.

Australia maintains a deeply integrated relationship with neighbouring New Zealand, with free mobility of citizens between the two countries under the Trans-Tasman Travel Arrangement and free trade under the Closer Economic Relations agreement. The most favourably viewed countries by the Australian people in 2021 include New Zealand, the United Kingdom, Japan, Germany, Taiwan, Thailand, the United States and South Korea. It also maintains an international aid program under which some 75 countries receive assistance. Australia ranked fourth in the Center for Global Development's 2021 Commitment to Development Index.

The power over foreign policy is highly concentrated in the prime minister and the national security committee, with major decision such as joining the 2003 invasion of Iraq made without prior Cabinet approval. Similarly, the Parliament does not play a formal role in foreign policy and the power to declare war lies solely with the executive government. The Department of Foreign Affairs and Trade supports the executive in its policy decisions.

=== Military ===
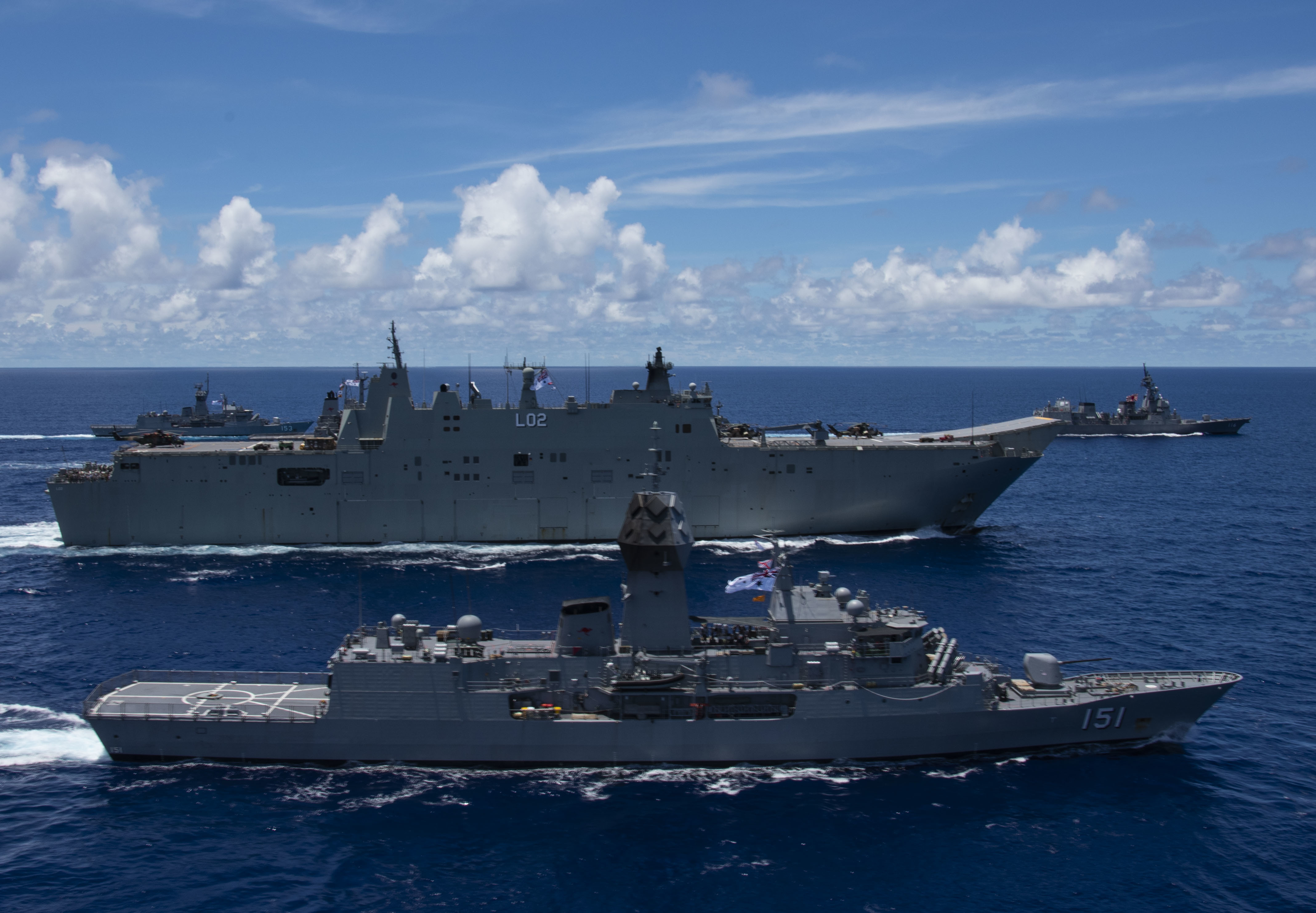
HMAS Canberra (L02), a Canberra-class landing helicopter dock, and HMAS Arunta, an Anzac-class frigate, sailing in formation

The two main institutions involved in the management of Australia's armed forces are the Australian Defence Force (ADF) and the Department of Defence, together known as "Defence". The Australian Defence Force is the military wing, headed by the chief of the defence force, and contains three branches: the Royal Australian Navy, the Australian Army and the Royal Australian Air Force. In 2021, it had 84,865 currently serving personnel (including 60,286 regulars and 24,581 reservists). The Department of Defence is the civilian wing and is headed by the secretary of defence. These two leaders collectively manage Defence as a diarchy, with shared and joint responsibilities. The titular role of commander-in-chief is held by the governor-general; however, actual command is vested in the chief of the Defence Force. The executive branch of the Commonwealth government has overall control of the military through the minister of defence, who is subject to the decisions of Cabinet and its National Security Committee. Major Australian intelligence agencies include the Australian Secret Intelligence Service (foreign intelligence), the Australian Signals Directorate (signals intelligence) and the Australian Security Intelligence Organisation (domestic security).

In 2022, defence spending was 1.9% of GDP, representing the world's 13th-largest defence budget. In 2024, the ADF had active operations in the Middle East and the Indo-Pacific (including security and aid provisions); was contributing to UN forces in relation to South Sudan, Syria–Israel peacekeeping, and North Korea; and domestically was assisting in natural disaster relief and assisting in preventing asylum-seekers from entering the country.

=== Human rights ===
Australia has generally strong protections for civil and political rights, and the country has signed up to a wide range of international rights treaties. Important documents protecting human rights include the Constitution, the Racial Discrimination Act 1975, the Sex Discrimination Act 1984, the Disability Discrimination Act 1992, and the Age Discrimination Act 2004. Same-sex marriage has been legal in the nation since 2017. Unlike other comparable Western democracies, Australia does not have a single federal charter of rights in the Constitution or under legislation; however, the ACT, Victoria, and Queensland have state-based ones.

International organisations such as Human Rights Watch and Amnesty International have expressed concerns in areas including asylum-seeker policy, Indigenous deaths in custody, the lack of entrenched rights protection, and laws restricting protesting.

== Economy ==
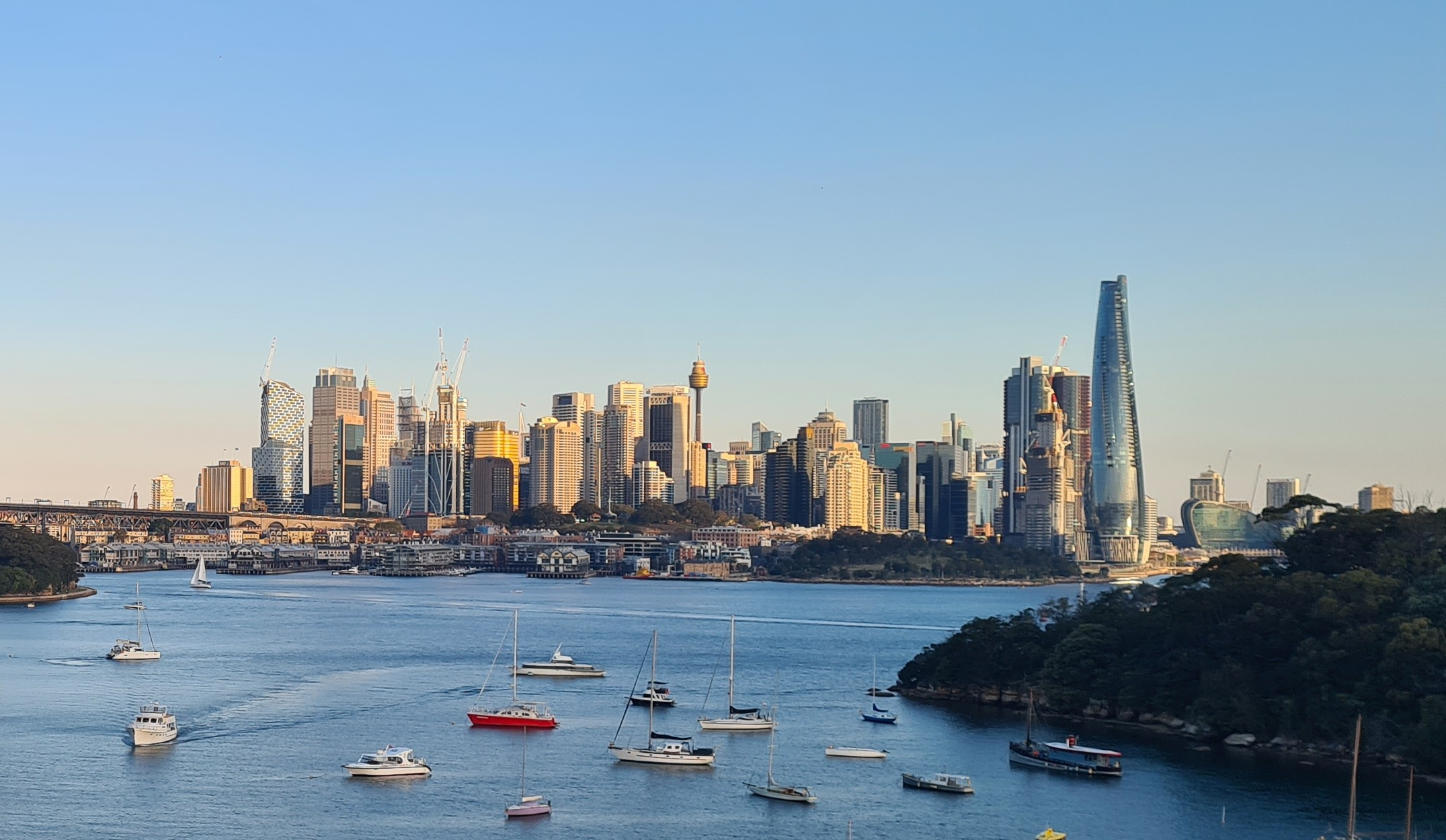
The central business district of Sydney is the financial centre of Australia.

Australia's mixed-market economy is highly developed and rich in natural resources. It is the world's twelfth largest by nominal terms and the twenty-third largest by PPP. As of 2021, Australia has the second-highest amount of wealth per adult, after Luxembourg, and the thirteenth-highest financial assets per capita, as well as one of the highest per capita incomes globally. It has a labour force of some 14.6 million, with an unemployment rate of 4.2% as of December 2025. According to the Australian Council of Social Service, the poverty rate of Australia exceeds 13.6% of the population, encompassing over 3.2 million. It also estimated that there were 774,000 (17.7%) children under the age of 15 living in relative poverty. The Australian dollar is the national currency, which is also used by three island states in the Pacific: Kiribati, Nauru and Tuvalu.

Australian government debt, about $963 billion in June 2022, exceeds 45.1% of the country's total GDP and is the world's eighth-highest. Australia had the second-highest level of household debt in the world in 2020, after Switzerland. Its house prices are among the highest in the world, particularly in large urban areas. The large service sector accounts for about 71.2% of total GDP, followed by the industrial sector (25.3%), while its agriculture sector makes up 3.6% of total GDP. Australia is the world's 24th-largest exporter and 21st-largest importer. China is Australia's largest trading partner, accounting for roughly 40% of the country's exports and 17.6% of its imports. Other major export markets include Japan, the United States and South Korea.

Australia has high levels of competitiveness and economic freedom and was ranked tenth in the Human Development Index (HDI) in 2022. It attracted 9.5 million international tourists in 2019 and was ranked thirteenth among the countries of Asia-Pacific in 2019 for inbound tourism. The 2021 Travel and Tourism Competitiveness Report ranked Australia seventh-highest in the world out of 117 countries. Its international tourism receipts in 2019 amounted to $45.7 billion.

=== Energy ===
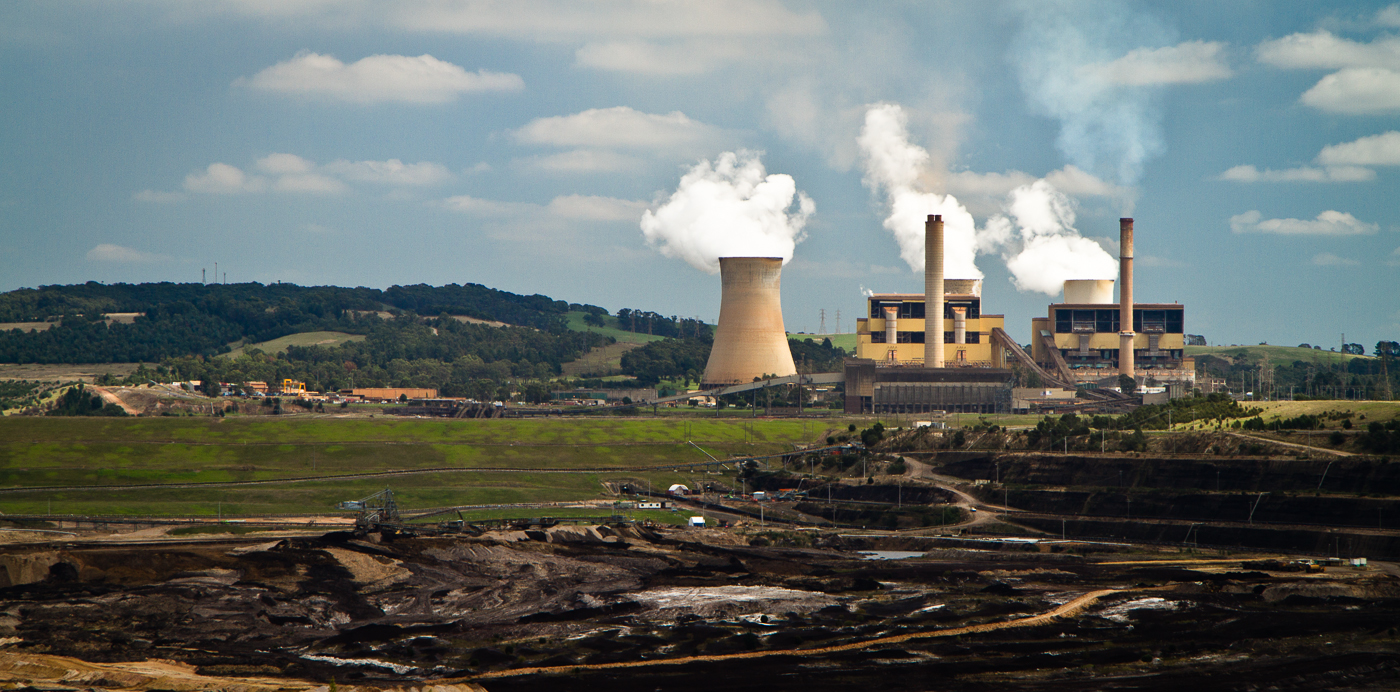
Yallourn Power Station with brown coal mine in the front, 2012

In 2021–22, Australia's generation of electricity was sourced from black coal (37.2%), natural gas (18.8%), solar (13.3%), brown coal (12%), wind (11.1%), hydro (6.5%), bio-energy (1.2%) and others (1.7%). Total consumption of energy in this period was sourced from oil (37.3%), coal (28.4%), gas (27.4%) and renewables (7%). From 2012 to 2022, the energy sourced from renewables has increased 5.7%, while energy sourced from coal has decreased 2.6%. The use of gas also increased by 1.5%, and the use of oil stayed relatively stable with a reduction of only 0.2%.

In 2020, Australia produced 27.7% of its electricity from renewable sources, exceeding the target set by the Commonwealth government in 2009 of 20% renewable energy by 2020. A new target of 82% renewable energy by 2030 was set in 2022, and a target for net zero emissions by 2050 was set in 2021.

=== Science and technology ===
In 2019, Australia spent $35.6 billion on research and development, allocating about 1.79% of GDP. A 2022 study by the industry lobby group, The Tech Council of Australia, stated that the Australian technology sector combined contributes $167 billion a year to the economy and employs 861,000 people. In 2022, startup ecosystems in Sydney and Melbourne were valued at $34 billion. Australia ranked 22nd in the Global Innovation Index 2025.

With only 0.3% of the world's population, Australia contributed over 4% of the world's published research in 2020, making it one of the top 10 research contributors in the world. CSIRO, Australia's national science agency, contributes 10% of all research in the country, while the rest is carried out by universities. Australian achievements include the invention of atomic absorption spectroscopy, the essential components of Wi-Fi technology, and the development of the first commercially successful polymer banknote. As of 2026, 14 Australian scientists have been awarded the Nobel Prize in physics, chemistry or medicine, and two have been awarded the Fields Medal.

Facilities supporting space exploration include the Square Kilometre Array and Australia Telescope Compact Array radio telescopes, telescopes such as the Siding Spring Observatory, and ground stations such as the Canberra Deep Space Communication Complex.

== Demographics ==
The population of Australia is estimated to be 27,801,023 as of December 2025. It is the 54th most populous country in the world and the most populous Oceanian country.

Australia has a population density of 3.4 persons per square kilometre of total land area, which makes it one of the most sparsely populated countries in the world. The population is heavily concentrated on the east coast, and in particular in the south-eastern region between South East Queensland to the north-east and Adelaide to the south-west.

Australia is also highly urbanised, with 67% of the population living in the Greater Capital City Statistical Areas (metropolitan areas of the state and mainland territorial capital cities) in 2018. Metropolitan areas with more than one million inhabitants are Sydney, Melbourne, Brisbane, Perth and Adelaide.

In common with many other developed countries, Australia is experiencing a demographic shift towards an older population, with more retirees and fewer people of working age. In 2021, the average age of the population was 39 years.

=== Cities ===
Australia has five cities (including their suburbs) that have populations larger than one million people. The majority of Australia's population lives near coastlines.

Largest populated areas in Australia 2023 data from Australian Bureau of Statistics
Rank	Name	State	Pop.	Rank	Name	State	Pop.
1	Sydney	NSW	5,450,496	11	Wollongong	NSW	313,745
2	Melbourne	VIC	5,207,145	12	Geelong	VIC	302,046
3	Brisbane	QLD	2,706,966	13	Hobart	TAS	253,654
4	Perth	WA	2,309,338	14	Townsville	QLD	186,734
5	Adelaide	SA	1,446,380	15	Cairns	QLD	160,933
6	Gold Coast–Tweed Heads	QLD&NSW	735,213	16	Darwin	NT	150,736
7	Newcastle–Maitland	NSW	526,515	17	Toowoomba	QLD	149,817
8	Canberra–Queanbeyan	ACT&NSW	503,402	18	Ballarat	VIC	116,390
9	Sunshine Coast	QLD	407,859	19	Bendigo	VIC	104,883
10	Central Coast	NSW	354,803	20	Albury-Wodonga	NSW&VIC	100,095

=== Ancestry and immigration ===
Australian residents by country of birth (2021 census)

Between 1788 and the Second World War, the vast majority of settlers and immigrants came from the British Isles (principally England, Ireland and Scotland), although Australia had significant immigration from China and Germany during the 19th century. Following Federation in 1901, the white Australia policy was strengthened, restricting further migration from these areas. However, this policy was relaxed following WW2, and in the decades following, Australia received a large wave of immigration from across Europe, with many more immigrants arriving from Southern and Eastern Europe than in previous decades. Following the end of the White Australia policy in 1973, Australia adopted multiculturalism as policy, culminating in the Racial Discrimination Act 1975. Subsequently, there has been a large and continuing wave of immigration from across the world, with Asia being the largest source of immigrants in the 21st century.

Today, Australia has the world's eighth-largest immigrant population. Immigrants account for 30% of the population, the highest proportion among major Western nations. In 2022–23, 212,789 permanent migrants were admitted to Australia, with a net migration population gain of 518,000 people inclusive of non-permanent residents. Most entered on skilled visas, however the immigration program also offers visas for family members and refugees.

The Australian Bureau of Statistics asks each Australian resident to nominate up to two ancestries each census and the responses are classified into broad ancestry groups. At the 2021 census, the most commonly nominated ancestry groups as a proportion of the total population were: 57.2% European (including 46% North-West European and 11.2% Southern and Eastern European), 33.8% Oceanian, (Note: Includes those who nominate "Australian" as their ancestry. The Australian Bureau of Statistics has stated that most who nominate "Australian" as their ancestry have at least partial Anglo-Celtic European ancestry.) 17.4% Asian (including 6.5% Southern and Central Asian, 6.4% North-East Asian, and 4.5% South-East Asian), 3.2% North African and Middle Eastern, 1.4% Peoples of the Americas, and 1.3% Sub-Saharan African. At the 2021 census, the most commonly nominated individual ancestries as a proportion of the total population were: (Note: Each person may nominate more than one ancestry, so the total may exceed 100%.)

- English (33%)
- Australian (29.9%) (Note: The Australian Bureau of Statistics has stated that most who nominate "Australian" as their ancestry have at least partial Anglo-Celtic European ancestry.)
- Irish (9.5%)
- Scottish (8.6%)
- Chinese (5.5%)
- Italian (4.4%)
- German (4%)
- Indian (3.1%)
- Aboriginal (2.9%) (Note: Those who nominated their ancestry as "Australian Aboriginal". Does not include Torres Strait Islanders. This relates to nomination of ancestry and is distinct from persons who identify as Indigenous (Aboriginal or Torres Strait Islander), which is a separate question.)
- Greek (1.7%)
- Filipino (1.6%)
- Dutch (1.5%)
- Vietnamese (1.3%)
- Lebanese (1%)

At the 2021 census, 3.8% of the Australian population identified as being Indigenous – Aboriginal Australians and Torres Strait Islanders. (Note: Indigenous identification is separate to the ancestry question on the Australian Census and persons identifying as Aboriginal or Torres Strait Islander may identify any ancestry.)

=== Language ===
English has no legal status in Australia but it is the de facto official and national language due to its widespread established use. Australian English is a major variety of the language with a distinctive accent and lexicon, and differs slightly from other varieties of English in grammar and spelling. General Australian serves as the standard dialect. The Australian sign language known as Auslan was used at home by 16,242 people at the time of the 2021 census.

At the 2021 census, English was the only language spoken in the home for 72% of the population. The next most common languages spoken at home were Mandarin (2.7%), Arabic (1.4%), Vietnamese (1.3%), Cantonese (1.2%) and Punjabi (0.9%).

More than 250 Australian Aboriginal languages are thought to have existed at the time of first European contact. The National Indigenous Languages Survey (NILS) for 2018–19 found that more than 120 Indigenous language varieties were in use or being revived, although 70 of those in use were endangered. The 2021 census found that 167 Indigenous languages were spoken at home by 76,978 Indigenous Australians – Yumplatok (Torres Strait Creole), Djambarrpuyngu (a Yolŋu language) and Pitjantjatjara (a Western Desert language) were among the most widely spoken. NILS and the Australian Bureau of Statistics use different classifications for Indigenous Australian languages.

=== Religion ===
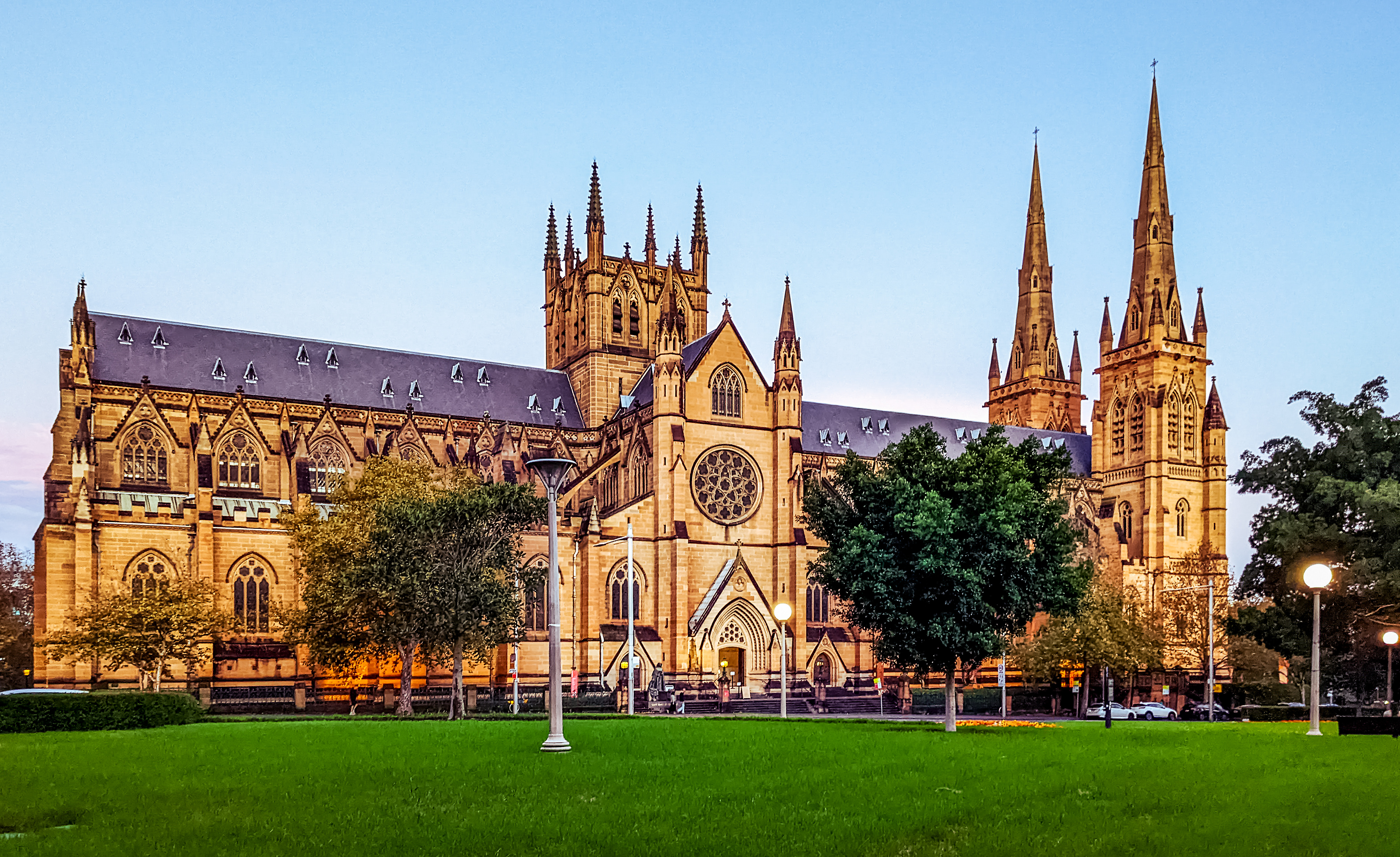
St Mary's Cathedral in Sydney belongs to the Catholic Church, Australia's largest religious denomination.

Australia has no state religion; section 116 of the Australian Constitution prohibits federal legislation that would establish any religion, impose any religious observance, or prohibit the free exercise of any religion. However, the states still retain the power to pass religiously discriminatory laws.

At the 2021 census, 38.9% of the population identified as having no religion, up from 15.5% in 2001. The largest religion is Christianity (43.9% of the population). The largest Christian denominations are the Catholic Church (20% of the population) and the Anglican Church of Australia (9.8%). Non-British immigration since the Second World War has led to the growth of non-Christian religions, the largest of which are Islam (3.2%), Hinduism (2.7%), Buddhism (2.4%), Sikhism (0.8%), and Judaism (0.4%).

In 2021, just under 8,000 people declared an affiliation with traditional Aboriginal religions. In Australian Aboriginal mythology and the animist framework developed in Aboriginal Australia, the Dreaming is a sacred era in which ancestral totemic spirit beings formed The Creation. The Dreaming established the laws and structures of society and the ceremonies performed to ensure continuity of life and land.

=== Health ===
Australia's life expectancy of 83 years (81 years for males and 85 years for females) is the fifth-highest in the world. It has the highest rate of skin cancer in the world, while cigarette smoking is the largest preventable cause of death and disease, responsible for 7.8% of the total mortality and disease. Ranked second in preventable causes is hypertension at 7.6%, with obesity third at 7.5%. Australia ranked 35th in the world in 2012 for its proportion of obese women and near the top of developed nations for its proportion of obese adults; 63% of its adult population is either overweight or obese.

Australia spent about 9.91% of its total GDP to health care in 2021. It introduced a national insurance scheme in 1975. Following a period in which access to the scheme was restricted, the scheme became universal once more in 1981 under the name of Medicare. The program is nominally funded by an income tax surcharge known as the Medicare levy, currently at 2%. The states manage hospitals and attached outpatient services, while the Commonwealth funds the Pharmaceutical Benefits Scheme (subsidising the costs of medicines) and general practice.

=== Education ===
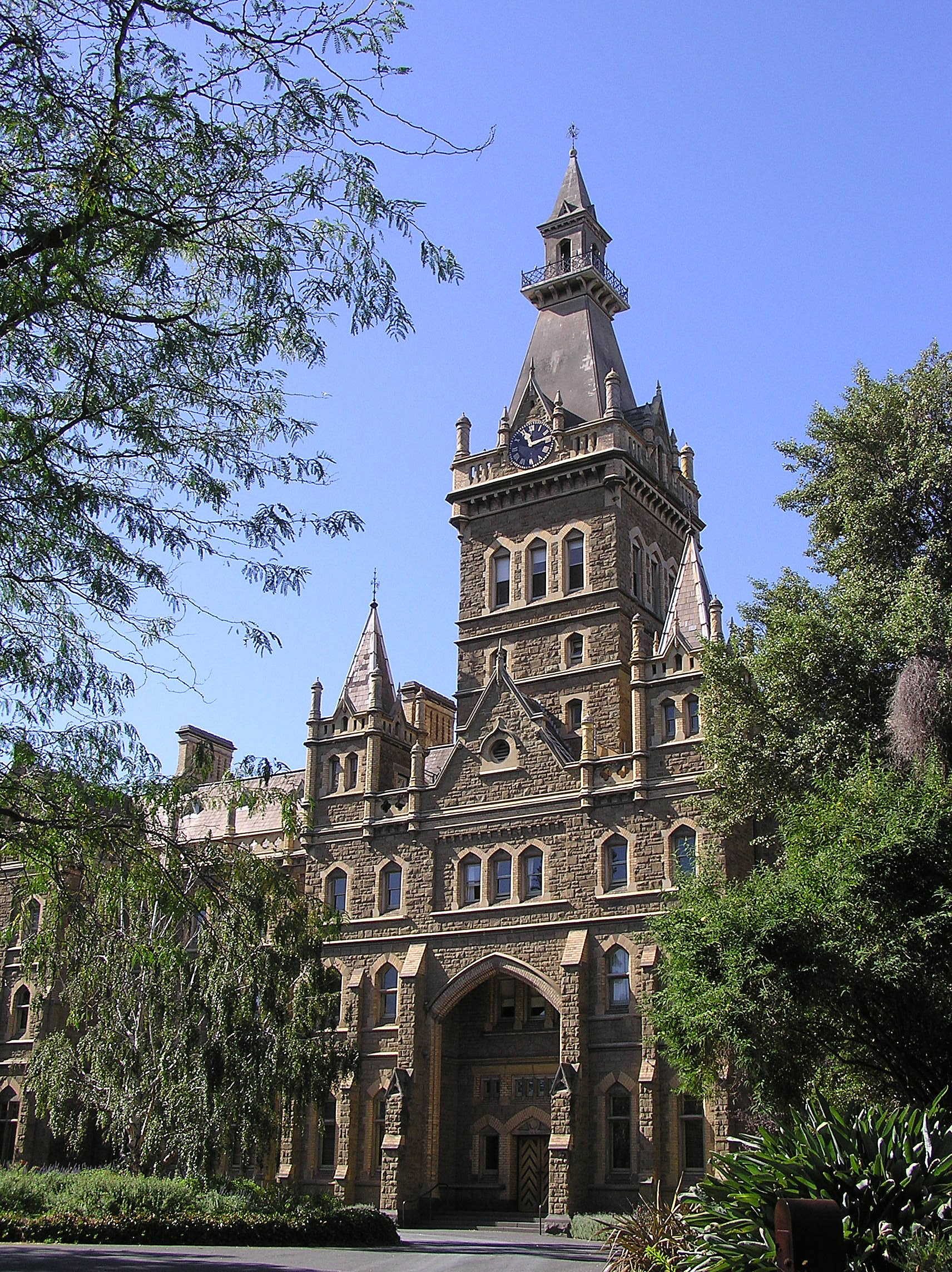
Australia has the highest ratio of international students per capita in the world, with Melbourne ranking fifth among the 2023 QS Best Student Cities (University of Melbourne pictured).

School attendance, or registration for home schooling, is compulsory throughout Australia. Education is primarily the responsibility of the individual states and territories; however, the Commonwealth has significant influence through funding agreements. Since 2014, a national curriculum developed by the Commonwealth has been implemented by the states and territories. Attendance rules vary between states, but in general children are required to attend school from the age of about 5 until about 16. In some states (Western Australia, Northern Territory and New South Wales), children aged 16–17 are required to either attend school or participate in vocational training, such as an apprenticeship. According to the 2022 PISA evaluations, Australian 15-year-olds ranked ninth in the OECD for reading and science and tenth for maths. However, less than 60% of Australian students achieved the National Proficiency Standard – 51% in maths, 58% in science and 57% in reading.

Australia has an adult literacy rate that was estimated to be 99% in 2003. However, a 2011–2012 report for the Australian Bureau of Statistics found that 44% of the population does not have high literary and numeracy competence levels, interpreted by others as suggesting that they do not have the "skills needed for everyday life".

Australia has 37 government-funded universities and three private universities, as well as a number of other specialist institutions that provide approved courses at the higher education level. The OECD places Australia among the most expensive nations to attend university. There is a state-based system of vocational training, known as TAFE, and many trades conduct apprenticeships for training new tradespeople. About 58% of Australians aged from 25 to 64 have vocational or tertiary qualifications and the tertiary graduation rate of 49% is the highest among OECD countries. 38% of Australia's population has attained a higher education qualification, which is among the highest percentages in the world.

Australia has the highest ratio of international students per head of population in the world by a large margin, with 812,000 international students enrolled in the nation's universities and vocational institutions in 2019. Accordingly, in 2019, international students represented on average 26.7% of the student bodies of Australian universities. International education therefore represents one of the country's largest exports and has a pronounced influence on the country's demographics, with a significant proportion of international students remaining in Australia after graduation on various skill and employment visas. Education is Australia's third-largest export, after iron ore and coal, and contributed more than $28 billion to the economy in the 2016–17 financial year. (Note: That is, 1 July 2016 to 30 June 2017.)

== Culture ==
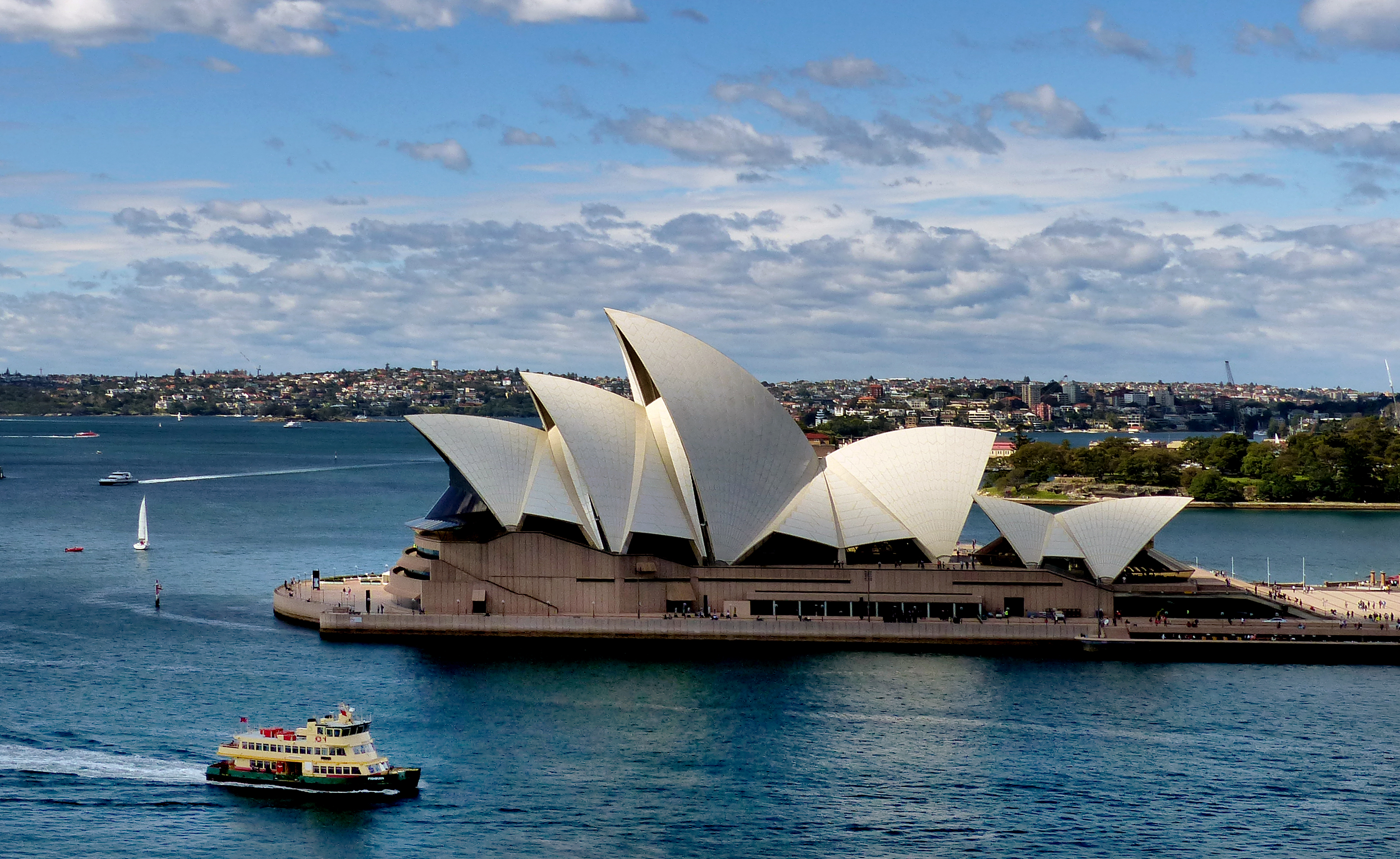
The Sydney Opera House was completed in 1973 and declared a UNESCO World Heritage Site in 2007, making it the youngest building to have received the designation.

Contemporary Australian culture is diverse and reflects the country's Indigenous traditions, British and Irish heritage, and post-1945 history of multicultural immigration. The culture of the United States has also been influential. The evolution of Australian culture since British colonisation has given rise to distinctive cultural traits.

Many Australians identify egalitarianism, mateship, irreverence and a lack of formality as part of their national identity. These find expression in Australian slang, as well as Australian humour, which is often characterised as dry, irreverent and ironic. New citizens and visa holders are required to commit to "Australian values", which are identified by the Department of Home Affairs as including: a respect for the freedom of the individual; recognition of the rule of law; opposition to racial, gender and religious discrimination; and an understanding of the "fair go", which is said to encompass the equality of opportunity for all and compassion for those in need. What these values mean, and whether Australians uphold them, has been debated since before Federation.

=== Arts ===
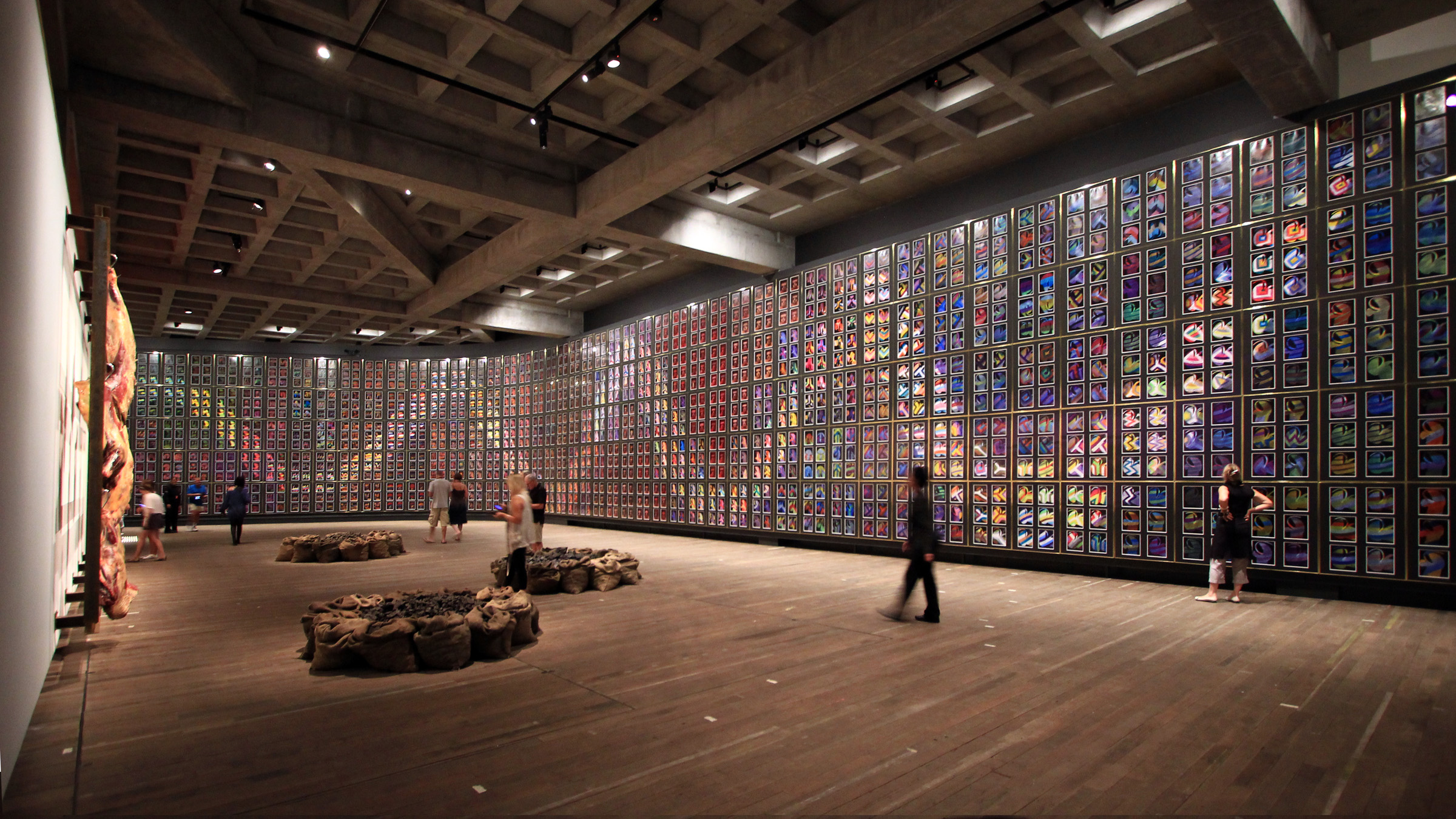
Held at the Museum of Old and New Art in Hobart, Tasmania, Sidney Nolan's Snake mural (1970) is inspired by the Aboriginal creation myth of the Rainbow Serpent, as well as desert flowers in bloom after a drought.

Australia has more than 100,000 Aboriginal rock art sites, and traditional designs, patterns and stories infuse contemporary Indigenous Australian art, "the last great art movement of the 20th century" according to critic Robert Hughes; its exponents include Emily Kame Kngwarreye. Early colonial artists showed a fascination with the unfamiliar land. The impressionistic works of Arthur Streeton, Tom Roberts and other members of the 19th-century Heidelberg School – the first "distinctively Australian" movement in Western art – gave expression to nationalist sentiments in the lead-up to Federation. While the school remained influential into the 1900s, modernists such as Margaret Preston and Clarice Beckett, and, later, Sidney Nolan, explored new artistic trends. The landscape remained central to the work of Aboriginal watercolourist Albert Namatjira, as well as Fred Williams, Brett Whiteley and other post-war artists whose works, eclectic in style yet uniquely Australian, moved between the figurative and the abstract.

Australian literature grew slowly in the decades following European settlement though Indigenous oral traditions, many of which have since been recorded in writing, are much older. In the 19th century, Henry Lawson and Banjo Paterson captured the experience of the bush using a distinctive Australian vocabulary. Their works are still popular; Paterson's bush poem "Waltzing Matilda" (1895) is regarded as Australia's unofficial national anthem. Miles Franklin is the namesake of Australia's most prestigious literary prize, awarded annually to the best novel about Australian life. Its first recipient, Patrick White, went on to win the Nobel Prize in Literature in 1973. Australian Booker Prize winners include Peter Carey, Thomas Keneally and Richard Flanagan. Australian public intellectuals have also written seminal works in their respective fields, including feminist Germaine Greer and philosopher Peter Singer.

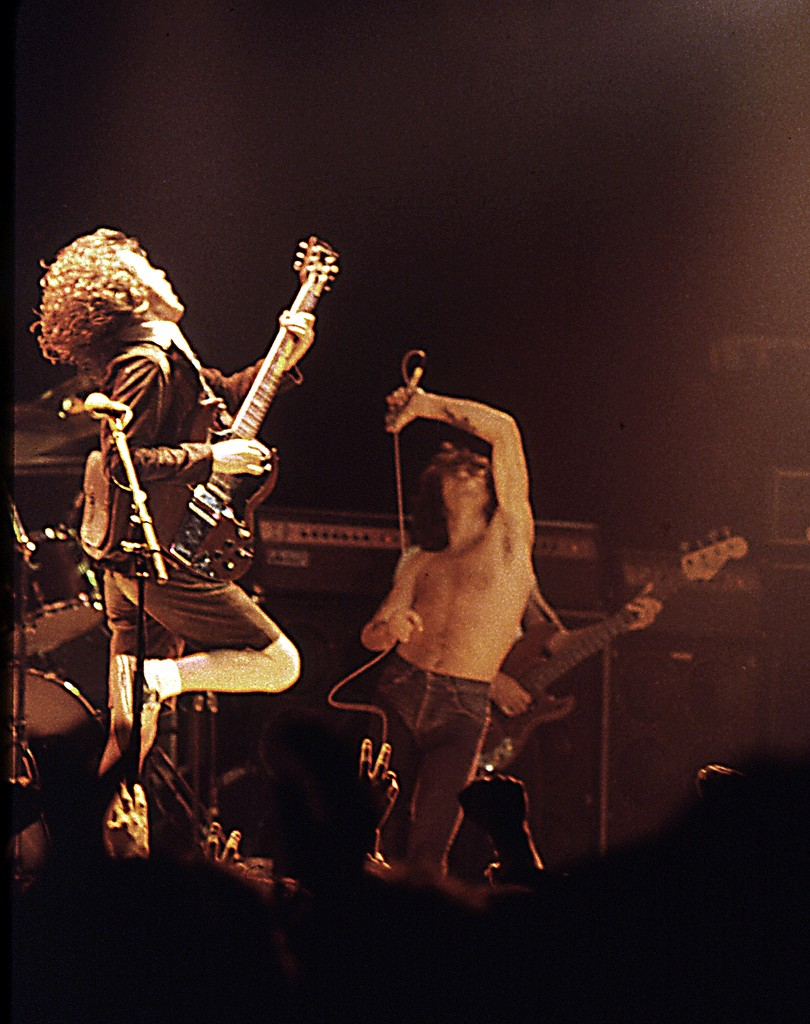
Arising from the Australian pub rock scene, AC/DC ranks among the world's best-selling music acts.

In the performing arts, Aboriginal peoples have traditions of religious and secular song, dance and rhythmic music often performed in corroborees. At the beginning of the 20th century, Nellie Melba was one of the world's leading opera singers, and later popular music acts such as the Bee Gees, AC/DC, INXS and Kylie Minogue achieved international recognition. Many of Australia's performing arts companies receive funding through the Australian government's Australia Council. There is a symphony orchestra in each state, and a national opera company, Opera Australia, well known for its famous soprano Joan Sutherland. Ballet and dance are represented by The Australian Ballet and various state companies. Each state has a publicly funded theatre company.

=== Media ===
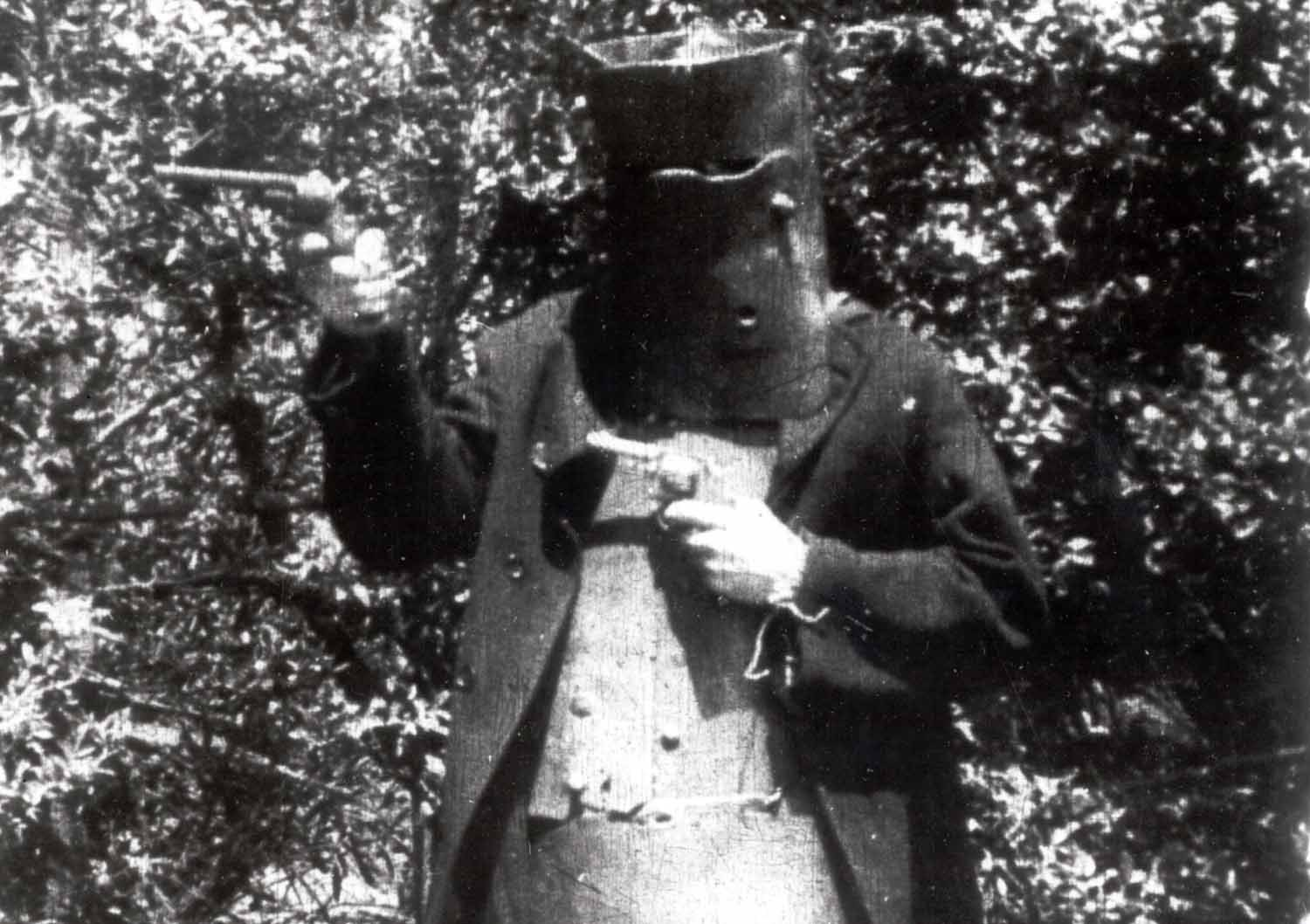
Actor playing the bushranger and outlaw Ned Kelly in The Story of the Kelly Gang (1906), the world's first feature-length narrative film

The Story of the Kelly Gang (1906), the world's first feature-length narrative film, spurred a boom in Australian cinema during the silent film era. After World War I, Hollywood monopolised the industry, and by the 1960s, Australian film production had effectively ceased. With the benefit of government support, the Australian New Wave of the 1970s brought provocative and successful films, many exploring themes of national identity, such as Picnic at Hanging Rock, Wake in Fright and Gallipoli, while Crocodile Dundee and the Ozploitation movement's Mad Max series became international blockbusters. In a film market flooded with foreign content, Australian films delivered a 7.7% share of the local box office in 2015. The AACTAs are Australia's premier film and television awards, and notable Academy Award winners from Australia include Geoffrey Rush, Nicole Kidman, Cate Blanchett and Heath Ledger.

Australia has two public broadcasters (the Australian Broadcasting Corporation and the multicultural Special Broadcasting Service), three commercial television networks, several pay-TV services, and numerous public, non-profit television and radio stations. Each major city has at least one daily newspaper, and there are two national daily newspapers, The Australian and The Australian Financial Review. In 2024, Reporters Without Borders placed Australia 39th on a list of 180 countries ranked by press freedom, behind New Zealand (19th) and the United Kingdom (23rd), but ahead of the United States (55th). This relatively low ranking is primarily because of the limited diversity of commercial media ownership in Australia; most print media are under the control of News Corp Australia (59%) and Nine Entertainment (23%).

=== Cuisine ===
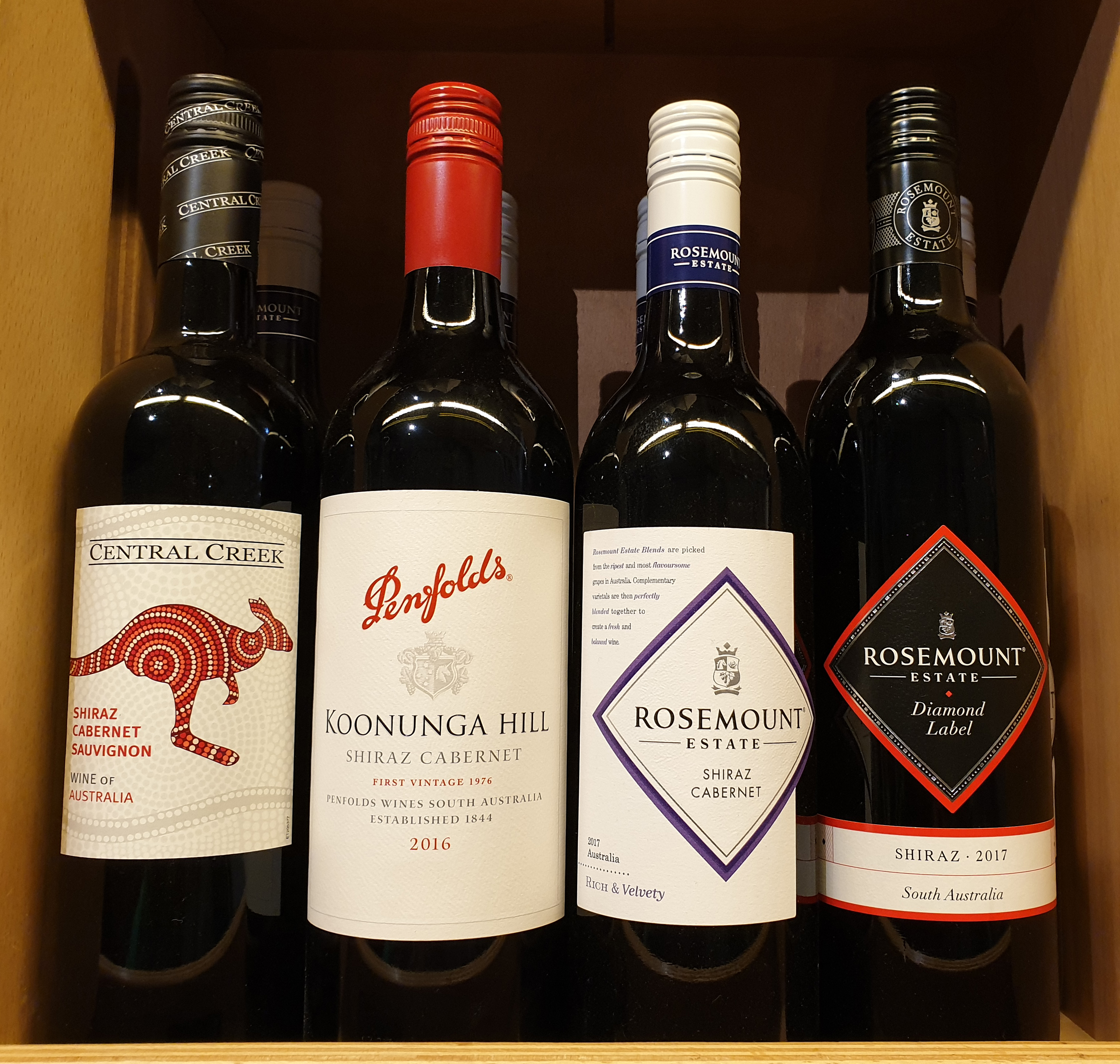
South Australian wines

Most Indigenous Australian groups subsisted on a diet of native fauna and flora, otherwise called bush tucker. It has increased in popularity among non-Indigenous Australians since the 1970s, with examples such as lemon myrtle, the macadamia nut and kangaroo meat now widely available.

The first colonists introduced British and Irish cuisine to the continent. This influence is seen in dishes such as fish and chips, and in the Australian meat pie, which is related to the British steak pie. Also during the colonial period, Chinese migrants paved the way for a distinctive Australian Chinese cuisine.

Post-war migrants transformed Australian cuisine, bringing with them their culinary traditions and contributing to new fusion dishes. Italians introduced espresso coffee and, along with Greeks, helped develop Australia's café culture, of which the flat white and avocado toast are now considered Australian staples. Pavlovas, lamingtons, Vegemite and Anzac biscuits are also often called iconic Australian foods.

Australia is a leading exporter and consumer of wine. Australian wine is produced mainly in the southern, cooler parts of the country. The nation also ranks highly in beer consumption, with each state and territory hosting numerous breweries.

=== Sport and recreation ===
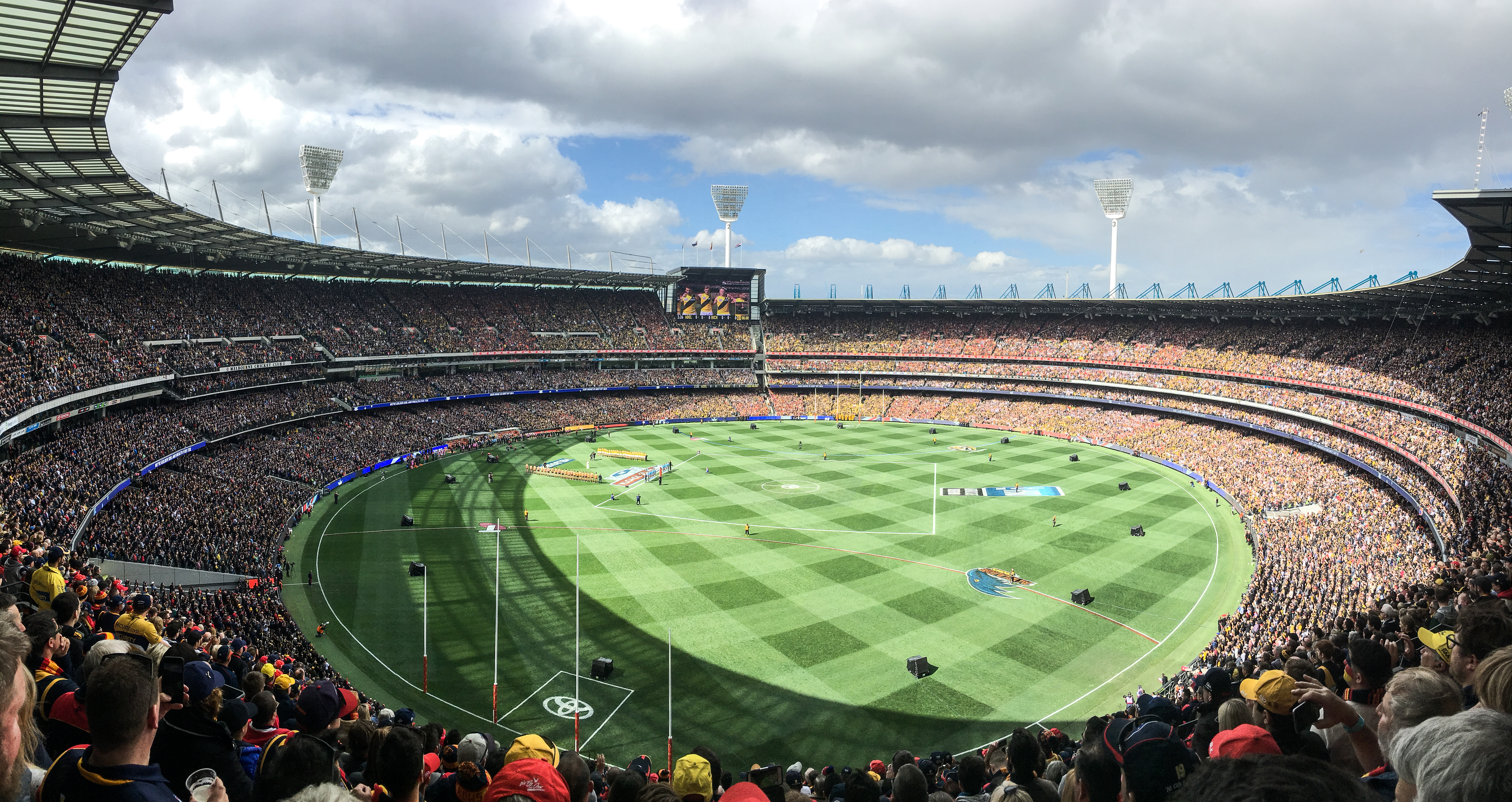
The Melbourne Cricket Ground is strongly associated with the history and development of cricket and Australian rules football, Australia's two most popular spectator sports.

The most popular sports in Australia by adult participation are: swimming, athletics, cycling, soccer, golf, tennis, basketball, surfing, netball and cricket.

Australia is one of five nations to have participated in every Summer Olympics of the modern era, and has hosted the Games twice: 1956 in Melbourne and 2000 in Sydney. It is also set to host the 2032 Games in Brisbane. Australia has also participated in every Commonwealth Games, hosting the event in 1938, 1962, 1982, 2006 and 2018.

The Australian national cricket team competed against England in both the first Test match (1877) and the first One Day International (1971), and against New Zealand in the first Twenty20 International (2004), winning all three games. It has also won the men's Cricket World Cup a record six times.

Australia has professional leagues for four football codes, whose relative popularity is divided geographically. Originating in Melbourne in the 1850s, Australian rules football attracts the most television viewers in all states except New South Wales and Queensland, where rugby league holds sway, followed by rugby union. Soccer, while ranked fourth in television viewers and resources, has the highest overall participation rates.

The surf lifesaving movement originated in Australia in the early 20th century, following the relaxation of laws prohibiting daylight bathing on Australian beaches. The volunteer lifesaver is one of the country's icons.

== See also ==
- Outline of Australia

== Bibliography ==
- Akami, Tomoko; Milner, Anthony (2013). "Australia in the Asia-Pacific Region". In Bashford, Alison; Macintyre, Stuart (eds.). The Cambridge History of Australia, Volume 2: The Commonwealth of Australia. Port Melbourne: Cambridge University Press. ISBN 9781107011540.
- Banivanua Mar, Tracey; Edmonds, Penelope (2013). "Indigenous and settler relations". In Bashford, Alison; Macintyre, Stuart (eds.). The Cambridge History of Australia, Volume 1, Indigenous and Colonial Australia. Cambridge University Press. ISBN 978-1-1070-1153-3.
- Bernard, J. L. R. (1989). The Pocket Macquarie Dictionary (1st ed.). Jacaranda Press. ISBN 978-0701633578.
- Blewett, Richard, ed. (2012). Shaping a Nation: a Geology of Australia. Canberra: Australian National University. ISBN 978-1-921862-82-3.
- Broome, Richard (2019). Aboriginal Australians (5th ed.). Crows Nest, NSW: Allen and Unwin. ISBN 9781760528218.
- Christopher, Emma; Maxwell-Stewart, Hamish (2013). "Convict transportation in global context c. 1700–88". In Bashford, Alison; Macintyre, Stuart (eds.). The Cambridge History of Australia, Volume 1, Indigenous and Colonial Australia. Cambridge University Press. ISBN 978-1-1070-1153-3.
- Coman, Brian J. (2007). A Loose Canon: Essays on History, Modernity and Tradition. Connor Court Publishing Pty Ltd. ISBN 978-0-9802-9362-3.
- COVID-19 Response Inquiry Panel (2024). Commonwealth Government COVID-19 Response Inquiry Report. Canberra: Commonwealth of Australia, Department of the Prime Minister and Cabinet. ISBN 978-1-925365-58-0.
- Curthoys, Ann; Mitchell, Jessie (2013). "The advent of self-government". In Bashford, Alison; Macintyre, Stuart (eds.). The Cambridge History of Australia, Volume 1, Indigenous and Colonial Australia. Cambridge University Press. ISBN 978-1-1070-1153-3.
- Davison, Graeme; Hirst, John; Macintyre, Stuart (1998). The Oxford Companion to Australian History. Melbourne: Oxford University Press. ISBN 978-0-1955-3597-6.
- Dean, Peter; Moss, Tristan, eds. (2021). "Introduction" (PDF). Fighting Australia's Cold War. Canberra: ANU Press. ISBN 978-1-76046-482-0. Archived (PDF) from the original on 12 January 2024.
- Dennis, Peter; Grey, Jeffrey; Morris, Ewan; Prior, Robin; Bou, Jean (2008). The Oxford Companion to Australian Military History (2nd ed.). Melbourne: Oxford University Press. ISBN 978-0-1955-1784-2.
- Finnane, Mark (2013). "Law and regulation". In Bashford, Alison; Macintyre, Stuart (eds.). The Cambridge History of Australia. Vol. 1, Indigenous and Colonial Australia. Cambridge University Press. ISBN 978-1-1070-1153-3.
- Flood, Josephine (2019). Original Australians (2 ed.). Crows Nest: Allen & Unwin. ISBN 978-1-76052-707-5.
- Garton, Stephen; Stanley, David (2013). "The Great War and its aftermath, 1914-22". In Bashford, Alison; Macintyre, Stuart (eds.). The Cambridge History of Australia, Volume 2: The Commonwealth of Australia. Port Melbourne: Cambridge University Press. ISBN 9781107011540.
- Henderson, Robert; Johnson, David (2016). Geology of Australia (3rd ed.). Port Melbourne: Cambridge University Press. ISBN 9781107432413.
- Jupp, James (2001). The Australian people: an encyclopedia of the nation, its people, and their origins. Cambridge University Press. ISBN 978-0-5218-0789-0.
- Karskens, Grace (2013). "The early colonial presence, 1788–1822". In Bashford, Alison; Macintyre, Stuart (eds.). The Cambridge History of Australia, Volume 1, Indigenous and Colonial Australia. Cambridge University Press. ISBN 978-1-1070-1153-3.
- Kennett, Brian; Chopping, Richard; Blewett, Richard (2018). The Australian Continent: A Geophysical Synthesis. Canberra: Australian National University Press. ISBN 9781760462468.
- Kercher, Bruce (2020). An Unruly Child: A History of Law in Australia. London and New York: Taylor & Francis. ISBN 9781000248470.
- Konishi, Shino; Nugent, Maria (2013). "Newcomers, c. 1600-1800". In Bashford, Alison; Macintyre, Stuart (eds.). The Cambridge History of Australia, Volume 1, Indigenous and Colonial Australia. Cambridge University Press. ISBN 978-1-1070-1153-3.
- Macintyre, Stuart (2020). A Concise History of Australia (5th ed.). Port Melbourne: Cambridge University Press. ISBN 9781108728485.
- Murphy, H; van Leeuwen, S (2021). Australia state of the environment 2021: biodiversity (PDF) (Report). doi:10.26194/ren9-3639.
- Nipperess, David A. (2015). "A separate creation: diversity, distinctiveness and conservation of Australian wildlife". In Stow, Adam; Maclean, Norman; Holwell, Gregory I. (eds.). Austral Ark: The State of Wildlife in Australia and New Zealand. Cambridge University Press. ISBN 978-1107033542.
- Reynolds, Henry (2022). Forgotten War (2nd ed.). Sydney: NewSouth Publishing. ISBN 9781742237596.
- Sáenz, Rogelio; Embrick, David G.; Rodríguez, Néstor P. (3 June 2015). The International Handbook of the Demography of Race and Ethnicity. Springer. ISBN 978-9-0481-8891-8. Archived from the original on 10 June 2024.
- Scott, Shirley (2021). "The Irrelevance of Non-recognition to Australia's Antarctic Territory Title" (PDF). International & Comparative Law Quarterly. 70 (April 2021): 491–503. doi:10.1017/S0020589321000051.
- Secher, Ulla (2004). "The Reception of Land Law into the Australian Colonies post-Mabo" (PDF). UNSW Law Journal. 27 (3) – via University of New South Wales.
- Smith, Bernard; Smith, Terry (1991). Australian painting 1788–1990. Melbourne: Oxford University Press. ISBN 978-0-1955-4901-0.
- Souter, Gavin (2000). Lion and Kangaroo: the Initiation of Australia (2nd ed.). Melbourne: Text Publishing. ISBN 1876485434.
- Teo, Hsu-Ming; White, Richard (2003). Cultural history in Australia. University of New South Wales Press. ISBN 978-0-8684-0589-6.
- Veth, Peter; O'Connor, Sue (2013). "The past 50,000 years: an archaeological view". In Bashford, Alison; Macintyre, Stuart (eds.). The Cambridge History of Australia, Volume 1, Indigenous and Colonial Australia. Cambridge University Press. ISBN 978-1-1070-1153-3.
