= Censorship in Australia =

Certain subject-matter in Australia is subject to various forms of government censorship. These include matters of national security, judicial non-publication or suppression orders, defamation law, the federal Racial Discrimination Act 1975 (Cth), film and literature (including video game) classification, and advertising restrictions.

Some forms of censorship are not administered directly by the government or courts. For example, some foreign websites have on occasion been blocked by Australian internet service providers. More recently, concerns have been raised as to the level of academic freedom enjoyed at Australia's public universities. Outside of these matters, standards for television, radio, recorded music, the press and most commercial advertising are enforced, in the first instance, by means of industry self-regulation.

== Legal protections ==
Australia does not have explicit freedom of speech in any constitutional or statutory declaration of rights, with the exception of political speech which is protected from criminal prosecution at common law per Australian Capital Television Pty Ltd v Commonwealth. There is however an "implied freedom of political communication" that was recognised in Lange v Australian Broadcasting Corporation.

In 1992 the High Court of Australia judged in the case of Australian Capital Television Pty Ltd v Commonwealth that the Australian Constitution, by providing for a system of representative and responsible government, implied the protection of political communication as an essential element of that system. This freedom of political communication is not a broad freedom of speech as in other countries, but rather a freedom that only protects political free speech. This freedom of political free speech is a shield against government prosecution, not a shield against private prosecution (civil law). It is also less a causal mechanism in itself, rather than simply a boundary which can be adjudged to be breached. Despite the court's ruling, however, not all political speech appears to be protected in Australia and several laws criminalise forms of speech that would be protected in republic countries such as the United States.

In 1996, Albert Langer was imprisoned for advocating that voters fill out their ballot papers in a way that was invalid. Amnesty International declared Langer to be a prisoner of conscience. The section which outlawed Langer from encouraging people to vote this way has since been repealed and the law now says only that it is an offence to print or publish material which may deceive or mislead a voter.

The Howard government expanded sedition law as part of the war on terror. Media Watch ran a series on the amendments on ABC television.

In 2003, CSIRO senior scientist Graeme Pearman was reprimanded and encouraged to resign after he spoke out on global warming. The Howard government was accused of limiting the speech of Pearman and other scientists.

In 2010, journalist Andrew Bolt was sued in the Federal Court over two posts on his Herald Sun blog in 2009. Bolt was found to have contravened the Racial Discrimination Act 1975 (RDA) in 2011 following comments regarded to be representative of a "eugenic" approach to aboriginal identity. This prompted the federal government to propose changes to the Racial Discrimination Act but this has been met with stiff resistance.

In 2014 the Supreme Court of Victoria issued a blanket media gag order on the reporting of a high-profile international corruption case. The gag order prevented the publishing of articles regarding bribes presented to high-ranking officials of Malaysia, Indonesia and Vietnam by senior executives of the Reserve Bank of Australia in order to secure the adoption of the Australian invented and produced polymer banknote technology.

== Australian Classification Board ==
Certain films, books and video games have, in effect, been banned from sale in Australia because they have been "refused classification" by the Australian Classification Board which was founded in 1970. Materials are generally refused classification because of explicit violent or sexual content.

Although the Australian Classification Board Guidelines state that "adults should be able to read, hear and see what they want", many books are apparently banned or given a restricted classification simply because they may offend certain segments of the population. Under particularly frequent attacks are books containing erotica, those concerning illegal drugs, and those discussing end-of-life issues (particularly those discussing or condoning assisted suicide). For example, in December 2006 the voluntary euthanasia book The Peaceful Pill Handbook was classified by the OFLC as X18+ and approved for publication. A month later, on appeal from the Australian Attorney General Philip Ruddock and Right to Life NSW, the book's classification was reviewed by the Literature Classification Board and rated RC (refused classification).

In 2000, Liberal Party of Australia Prime Minister John Howard had the Australian Classification Board prohibit depictions of certain sexual fetishes including candle wax, bondage, spanking, fisting, and golden showers. Sexually explicit depictions of adults who appeared to look under 18 years of age were also prohibited by the Board. The Australian Sex Party accused these actions of censoring depictions of female ejaculation and censoring adult women with small breasts.

== Banned publications ==
=== Imports ===
Publications, films, computer games and any other goods that describe, depict, express or otherwise deal with matters of sex, drug misuse or addiction, crime, cruelty, violence, terrorist acts or revolting or abhorrent phenomena in such a way that they offend against the standards of morality, decency and propriety generally accepted by reasonable adults are not allowed.

— Australian Border Force website

In Australia, the importation of certain books, video games, and media are prohibited based on its non-fictional or fictional contents. It was reported on in 2021, that the Australian Border Force stated that any depictions of sex, drug misuse or addiction, crime, cruelty, violence, terrorist acts, or revolting content that offends moral standards and decency, are prohibited.

=== Book censorship until 1970 ===
Book censorship has existed in Australia since the 19th century. Each state had its own legislation, including:

- Obscene and Indecent Publications Act 1901 (New South Wales) (later Indecent Articles and Publications Act 1975)
- Police Offences Act 1958 (Victoria)
- Indecent Publications and Articles Act 1902-1983 (Western Australia)

Norman Lindsay's Redheap was the first book to be banned from import into Australia, in May 1930, under the Commonwealth Customs Act 1901. This was before the establishment of the Commonwealth Book Censorship Board in 1933 by Prime Minister Joseph Lyons' United Australia Party, which was renamed the Literature Censorship Board in 1937. The novel Upsurge, written by J. M. Harcourt and published in 1934, became the first Australian book to be officially banned under the guidelines of the Commonwealth Book Censorship Board It was initially banned as seditious, later reviewed and the ban confirmed, ostensibly on grounds of indecency and explicit depictions of sex under the Indecent Publications Act. However the main cause of its ban was its socialist tone and subversive agenda which criticised capitalism, featuring communist characters in its portrayal of life in the relief camps of the Depression.

In the 1960s, censorship laws came under pressure when "three intrepid Sydney activists," Alexander William Sheppard, Leon Fink and Ken Buckley, locally published D. H. Lawrence's The Trial of Lady Chatterley (Sydney, 1965), which was at that time banned in Australia, and Sheppard then published James Baldwin's Another Country (1966). In 1970, Penguin Books had three copies of Portnoy's Complaint smuggled into Australia and then secretly printed 75,000 copies of the book. In the early 1970s Don Chipp, the federal Minister of Customs and Excise, largely ended censorship of printed material in the country, with Australians being able to read such books as Portnoy’s Complaint and Henry Miller's Tropic of Cancer.

=== List of banned books ===
Title	Author(s)	Year published	Year banned	Year unbanned	Type	Notes
The Decameron	Giovanni Boccaccio	1353	1927	1936	Story collection	Banned in Australia from 1927 to 1936 and from 1938 to 1973.
The Decameron	Giovanni Boccaccio	1353	1938	1973	Story collection	Banned in Australia from 1927 to 1936 and from 1938 to 1973.
The 120 Days of Sodom (1789)	Marquis de Sade	1789	1957	*Unknown*	Novel	Banned by the Australian Government in 1957 for obscenity.
Droll Stories	Honoré de Balzac	1837	1901	1923	Short stories	Banned for obscenity from 1901 to 1923 and from 1928 to c. 1973.
Droll Stories	Honoré de Balzac	1837	1928	1973	Short stories	Banned for obscenity from 1901 to 1923 and from 1928 to c. 1973.
The Straits Impregnable	Sydney Loch	1916	1916	*Unknown*	Fictionalised autobiography	First edition published as a novel, second edition banned by the military censor in Australia under regulations of the War Precautions Act 1914.
Lady Chatterley's Lover (1928)	D. H. Lawrence	1928	1929	1965	Novel	Banned from 1929 to 1965.
Rowena Goes Too Far (1931)	H. C. Asterley	1931	*Unknown*	*Unknown*	Novel	Banned in Australia because of customs belief that it "lacked sufficient claim to the literary to excuse the obscenity"
Brave New World	Aldous Huxley	1932	1932	1937	Novel	Banned in Australia from 1932 to 1937.
The Cautious Amorist	Norman Lindsay	1932	1933	1953	Novel	Banned in Australia from 1933 to 1953.
Age of Consent	Norman Lindsay	1938		by 1939	Novel	Banned in Australia, briefly, in 1938.
Forever Amber (1944)	Kathleen Winsor	1944	1945	*Unknown*	Novel	Banned by Australia in 1945 as "a collection of bawdiness, amounting to sex obsession."
Borstal Boy	Brendan Behan	1958		*Unknown*	Autobiographical novel	Banned shortly after its ban in Ireland in 1958.
Another Country	James Baldwin	1962	1963	1966	Novel	Banned in Australia by the Commonwealth Customs Department in February 1963. The Literature Censorship Board described it as "continually smeared with indecent, offensive and dirty epithets and allusions," but recommended that the book remain available to "the serious minded student or reader." The ban was lifted in May 1966.
Ecstasy and Me	Hedy Lamarr	1966	1967	1973	Autobiography	Banned in Australia from 1967 to 1973.
The World Is Full of Married Men (1968)	Jackie Collins	1968		*Unknown*	Novel	Banned in Australia in 1968.
The Stud (1969)	Jackie Collins	1969		*Unknown*	Novel	Banned in Australia in 1969.
The Anarchist Cookbook	William Powell	1971	1985	Currently banned	Instructional	The book was refused classification in 1985 thus making it banned in Australia under the National Classification Code Table 1.(c) for publications that could "promote, incite or instruct in matters of crime or violence"
How to make disposable silencers (1984)	Desert and Eliezer Flores	1984	*Unknown*	*Unknown*	Instructional	An example of a class of books banned in Australia that "promote, incite or instruct in matters of crime or violence".
American Psycho	Bret Easton Ellis	1991		1992 (ages 18+) *Unknown* (younger than 18)	Novel	Sale and purchase was banned in the Australian state of Queensland. Now available in public libraries and for sale to people 18 years and older. Sale restricted to persons at least 18 years old in the other Australian states.
A Sneaking Suspicion (1995)	John Dickson	1995	2015		Religious text	Banned by the New South Wales Department of Education and Communities from state schools on May 6, 2015, on the basis of a "potential risk to students in the delivery of this material, if not taught sensitively and in an age appropriate manner." The ban was lifted May 18, 2015.
The Peaceful Pill Handbook (2007)	Philip Nitschke and Fiona Stewart	2007			Instructional manual on euthanasia	The book was initially restricted in Australia; after review, the 2007 edition was banned outright.
You: An Introduction (2008)	Michael Jensen	2008	2015		Religious text	Banned by the New South Wales Department of Education and Communities from state schools on May 6, 2015, on the basis of a "potential risk to students in the delivery of this material, if not taught sensitively and in an age appropriate manner." The ban was lifted May 18, 2015.
No Game No Life (Volumes 1, 2, 9)	Yuu Kamiya	2012–2016	2020	*Unknown*	Novel	Light novel volumes banned in Australia due to their depiction, "in a way that is likely to cause offence to a reasonable adult, [of] a person who is, or appears to be, a child under 18".

== Press freedom ==
Freedom House reported in 2021 that although Australia's "constitution does not explicitly protect press freedom, journalists scrutinise lawmakers and the government, covering controversial topics generally without serious obstacles or risk of harassment or violence." However, it expressed concern about two police raids conducted in 2019, and the widespread use of judicial suppression orders. Press freedom may also be affected by the provisions of defamation law and the Commonwealth RDA, which are discussed in the following sections.

Australia has been on a decline on the Press Freedom Index curated by the Reporters Without Borders, in reflection of rising media censorship and intimidation of journalists in the country, including media companies maintaining close ties to political leaders, fueling doubts about editorial independence. Two giant firms dominate mass media in Australia – Nine Entertainment and News Corp Australia, a subsidiary of American-based News Corp. The country was ranked 19th out of 180 countries in 2018, before subsequently dropping to 26th out of 180 countries for 2020 and 39th in 2022.

=== National security ===
The Australian Government has occasionally acted against media outlets for reasons of national security. In June 2019, federal police raided the Sydney offices of the Australian Broadcasting Corporation and the home of Sunday Telegraph political editor Annika Smethurst, seeking evidence against officials who may have leaked sensitive government information to journalists. Both raids were widely condemned in media and legal circles, and led to a review.

=== Suppression and non-publication orders ===
Commonwealth, State and territory law provides for the suppression or non-publication of certain information regarding legal proceedings. This can be to avoid contaminating the jury pool, or to protect the identities of children and sexual assault victims. While these orders are generally targeted at journalists, in the past the transmission of television crime dramas has been delayed as a result.

The case of Cardinal George Pell is one cited by Freedom House. The conviction of one of the Vatican's most senior officials made headlines around the world, yet a suppression order banned all Australian media outlets from reporting the story. The order was intended to avoid the verdict influencing a future trial involving separate charges (these were later dropped). Australians could, however, readily find the news on foreign websites. Melbourne's Herald Sun newspaper posted on its front page "CENSORED" in large print in protest of the ban, noting that international sources were reporting on a "very important story that is relevant to Victorians". Victorian authorities later charged 36 individual journalists and news organisations with breaching suppression orders related to the verdict.

== Defamation ==
Australian law of defamation developed primarily out of the English law of defamation and its cases, though now there are differences introduced by statute and by the implied constitutional limitation on governmental powers to limit speech of a political nature established in Lange v Australian Broadcasting Corporation (1997).

On 10 December 2002, the High Court of Australia delivered judgment in the Internet defamation case of Dow Jones v Gutnick. The judgment established that internet-published foreign publications that defamed an Australian in their Australian reputation could be held accountable under Australian defamation law. The case gained worldwide attention and is often said, inaccurately, to be the first of its kind. A similar case that predates Dow Jones v Gutnick is Berezovsky v Forbes in England.

Among the various common law jurisdictions, some Americans have presented a visceral and vocal reaction to the Gutnick decision. On the other hand, the decision mirrors similar decisions in many other jurisdictions such as England, Scotland, France, Canada and Italy.

In 2006, uniform defamation laws came into effect across Australia. In addition to fixing the problematic inconsistencies in law between individual States and Territories, the laws made a number of changes to the common law position, including:

- Abolishing the distinction between libel and slander.
- Providing new defenses including that of triviality, where it is a defense to the publication of a defamatory matter if the defendant proves that the circumstances of publication were such that the plaintiff was unlikely to sustain any harm.
- The defenses against defamation may be negated if there is proof the publication was actuated by malice.
- Greatly restricting the right of corporations to sue for defamation (see e.g. Defamation Act 2005 (Vic), s 9). Corporations may, however, still sue for the tort of injurious falsehood, where the burden of proof is greater than in defamation, because the plaintiff must show that the defamation was made with malice and resulted in economic loss.

The 2006 reforms also established across all Australian states the availability of truth as an unqualified defense; previously a number of states only allowed a defense of truth with the condition that a public interest or benefit existed. The defendant however still needs to prove that the defamatory imputations are substantially true.

== Advertising bans ==
Commonwealth and State governments ban or restrict certain types of advertising in order to maintain the integrity of elections, personal injury law and the Pharmaceutical Benefits Scheme.

=== Personal injury lawyers ===
Lawyers in most Australian states are censored in respect of public statements they are allowed to publish concerning personal injury compensation law. Non-lawyers are also prohibited from publishing statements on the subject in some states. The laws are described as a ban on advertising of personal injury compensation but go much further.

The censorship must be self-administered, and breaches render a lawyer liable to prosecution, disbarment and, potentially, even jail. These laws coincided with the Insurance Crisis, the Ipp report and Civil Liability laws.

In New South Wales all lawyer public statements concerning personal injury compensation are prohibited.

==== Queensland ====
In Queensland television and radio advertising is banned and lawyer statements concerning personal injury compensation law must be censored so as to contain only:

- The lawyer's name, contact details and area of speciality (print and other "allowed publications" only);
- The operation of the law of negligence and a person's rights under that law (lawyers' websites only);
- The lawyer's terms of service (lawyers' websites only).

The Queensland censorship provisions were originally intended to ban distasteful advertisements by some personal injury law firms that promoted "cash for injuries". The Queensland Attorney-General stated in his Second Reading speech when introducing the legislation in 2002 as follows:

The bill also better regulates provocative advertising by lawyers in relation to personal injury services ... the sort of advertising currently broadcast on radio and television does not enhance clients' rights or portray the profession in a particularly positive light.

Section 4 (2) (f) of the Queensland Act refers to "regulating inappropriate advertising..."

However the Queensland government has since given the censorship provisions the strictest possible interpretation and threatened hundreds of lawyers with prosecution.

One of the many outcomes that impact on freedom of expression and free speech is that concerning lawyers' web sites. A lawyer must not even list "personal injury" even merely as a link on a webpage that has no relation to the prohibited subject matter.

In practice, lawyers are prohibited from listing even on their website homepage some of the areas of law they practise in. Photos, images, slogans are prohibited. All references to personal injury compensation law must be censored out of website staff profiles containing anything more than the person's name, contact details and area of expertise.

Some other subject matter that must be censored out of web sites and other publications includes: winning verdicts and settlements; mention of the law firms reputation, expertise and history; testimonials; case histories; the standard of service and many other things that would allow consumers to differentiate among competitors.

The Queensland censorship provisions have not yet been judicially interpreted. It is unknown whether the ultra-strict interpretation contended for by the Queensland government will be upheld by a court.

==== New South Wales ====
In New South Wales, all statements by lawyers concerning personal injury compensation including on websites are banned and strict penalties apply. One lawyer has already been professionally punished and fined $20,000 for making a website statement.

The New South Wales version of the censorship law which is stricter than that of Queensland was considered by the High Court of Australia in 2005. The plaintiffs argued that the law was invalid because it infringed the implied constitutional freedom of political communication and secondly that it infringed Chapter III of the Constitution and the rule of law.

In a majority decision the court held that the New South Wales censorship law was valid. It did not accept that statements merely about personal injury compensation law were of a political nature. It implied however that any statements criticising the censorship itself and tort "reform" would be in the nature of political communication that was protected. The majority also ruled against the plaintiffs on the second argument (but the minority were strongly of the view) that the law unreasonably interfered with lawyers going about their constitutionally protected vocation.

On 20 June 2008, Justice Adams of the Supreme Court of NSW held that clause 34 of the Legal Profession Regulation 2005 which bans personal injury advertising in NSW by non-lawyers, was void because it was Ultra Vires the Legal Profession Act 2004.

==== Victoria ====
No censorship applies in Victoria.

==== Western Australia ====
The Western Australian censorship rules are similar to those in Queensland. However, television advertising is permitted by ACMA.

==== Consumer opposition ====
The Australian Lawyers Alliance opposes the censorship and believes that "content-rich statements" concerning the availability of all legal services are in the public interest.

Consumer groups (e.g. Tort Reform Institute, Insurance Reform) argue that any restriction on lawyer communication is adverse to the public interest. They argue that the public should be fully informed about their rights particularly under consumer protection laws that generate compensation payments, and that censorship that keeps the public under-informed cannot be justified. In their view, the protection of insurance company profits is not a sufficient "public purpose" to warrant the interference in personal freedoms by way of censorship. The ultimate aim of the government and insurers, according to such consumer groups, is to eliminate the expression "personal injury compensation" from the Australian vocabulary and to dissuade citizens from exercising compensation rights by making it "distasteful" to do so.

Exceptions to the censorship provision apply to:

- Insurance companies, who are permitted to advertise that personal injury claims can be made directly with them; or
- Statements concerning the defence of personal injury claims as opposed to the pursuit of those claims (except in New South Wales)

== Internet censorship ==
Some activists consider Australia's laws on Internet censorship to be amongst the most restrictive in the western world. However, the restrictive nature of the laws has been combined with almost complete lack of interest in enforcement from the agencies responsible.

Some of the interesting exceptions include an attempt by then NSW Police Minister Michael Costa to shut down Melbourne Indymedia, a case in 2001 involving the US Secret Service that was eventually pleaded out, and an attempt by the FBI using the Australian Federal Police to censor a Victorian they alleged was posting threats to the US.

A collection of both federal and state laws apply, but the most important is the federal legislation which came into effect on 1 January 2000.

If a complaint is issued about material on the Internet, the ACMA is empowered to examine the material under the guidelines for film and video. If it is found that a) the material would be classified X18+, or b) the material would classified R18+ and the site does not have an adult verification system, or c) the material would be refused classification:

- If the site is hosted in Australia, the ACMA is empowered to issue a "takedown notice" under which the material must be removed from the site.
- If the site is hosted outside Australia, the site is added to a list of banned sites.

This list of banned sites is then added to filtering software, which must be offered to all consumers by Internet Service Providers and the Australian Government.

On 31 December 2007 the Telecommunications Minister of the newly elected Labor government, Stephen Conroy, announced that Australia would introduce mandatory internet filtering. Once more the reason given is that mandatory filtering is required to "provide greater protection to children from online pornography and violent websites".

As of November 2008, the plan includes two blacklists, one of which will filter illegal content according to internet content laws as well as other "unwanted" content, and the other will also filter content unsuitable for children. Internet users will be able to opt out of the secondary blacklist for children, but will not be able to opt out of the primary filter, sparking free speech concerns. No statement has been made about what content will be considered "illegal", or what Stephen Conroy means by "unwanted".

Slated for blocking, should the "Clean Feed" Act be passed by Australia's Federal Parliament, is the website of Dr Philip Nitschke's banned book, The Peaceful Pill Handbook. The inclusion of Nitschke's euthanasia book's website came to light after the Government's list of would-be banned websites was leaked to wikileaks.org. The Peaceful Pill Handbook was listed on the leaked internet website blacklist, wedged in alphabetical order between the porn sites panty-ass.com and pickyourperversion.com.

This produced a huge backlash from the community, including the Get Up advertisement Censordyne. Conroy eventually abandoned the proposal, saying that the relevant authority was already invested in ACMA, which didn't take any action in accordance.

After the election of the Coalition government in 2013, one act was passed that allows the blocking of websites that host pirated content, if the content provider has contacted the Australian government about it and they have gone through the procedures set out through the act, then the website will be blocked under s.115a of the Copyright Amendment (Online Infringement) Bill 2015.

There has been two applications to Section.115a, one by Foxtel and another by Village Roadshow, which would prohibit an Australian pirate site from functioning and block The Pirate Bay respectively. The Federal Court has ruled that ISPs must block a range of torrent sites including The Pirate Bay using either DNS hijacking, URL blocking or some other mutually agreed method by ISPs and rights holders.

There has been reports of individuals from Australia collaborating with Chinese Great Firewall security officials and other officials from Cyberspace Administration of China in implementing its data retention and filtering infrastructure and possibly obtained surveillance technology from China.

On 20 March 2019 Australian telecom company Telstra denied access to millions of Australians to the websites 4chan, 8chan, Zero Hedge, Voat, Archive.today, and Liveleak as a reaction to the Christchurch mosque shootings.

== Non-government forms of censorship ==
=== Universities ===
Concerns have been expressed by Freedom House and others about protections for freedom of speech and academic freedom at Australia's universities. In 2018, the Australian Government asked former Chief Justice Robert French to conduct an independent review of freedom of speech and academic freedom in Australian higher education. While French disagreed that there was a "freedom of speech crisis" on campuses, he nonetheless noted the risks to freedom posed by the various and vaguely-worded protections then in place. Concerns include the influence of the People's Republic of China on university administrations; 'deplatforming' of controversial speakers and viewpoints; and demands that academics refrain from contesting one another's conclusions.

==== Deplatforming ====
Many Australian university campuses have seen protests by students and faculty against unorthodox or controversial viewpoints. Several universities refused to host Copenhagen Consensus or Ramsay research centres following left-wing protests.

==== Internal criticism ====
Another threat is action by universities to silence internal criticism. In 2016, James Cook University sacked marine scientist Peter Ridd for publishing an article questioning the reproducibility of his colleagues' work on the Great Barrier Reef. The Federal Court later ruled the university had acted unlawfully, awarding Ridd more than $1 million in damages.

=== Advertising boycotts ===
Campaigners including the anonymous American group Sleeping Giants have attempted to force certain conservative and libertarian commentators off Australian radio and television by threatening to boycott broadcasters' advertisers. Targets of this approach have included both hosts, such as radio presenter Alan Jones and former Northern Territory Chief Minister Adam Giles, and guests, such as former senator David Leyonhjelm.

=== Advertising standards ===
Standards for commercial advertising in Australia are enforced via industry self-regulation.

== Symbol/Slogan bans ==
=== Symbol ===
The public display of Nazi flags is illegal nationwide, as well as in the states of New South Wales (2022), Queensland (2023), Tasmania (2023), Victoria (2022) (where the Nazi salute is also banned) and Western Australia (2024). Laws have also been proposed in the remaining states and territories. In June 2023, the Albanese government introduced legislation to criminalize the sale and public display of Nazi symbols and the public performance of the Nazi salute. It was introduced under the bill "Counter-Terrorism Legislation Amendment (Prohibited Hate Symbols and Other Measures)". The law went into effect on 8 January 2024, and violations are punishable by up to 12 months in prison.

On 8 October 2024, Jacob Hersant of the National Socialist Network became the first Victorian to be found guilty of performing a Nazi salute.

=== Slogan ===
In 2025, The New South Wales state government proposed legislation to ban public chants and displays of "globalise the intifada", alongside banned extremist symbols. New South Wales Premier Chris Minns called the slogan hate speech that encourages violence. Tougher hate speech laws are to being proposed in Australia and the United Kingdom, including a proposed ban on the slogan. The proposition in the United Kingdom also came shortly after police arrested two people in London on racially aggravated public order charges for allegedly shouting the word or phrase "intifada" at a pro-Palestinian protest.

In February 2026, Queensland proposed to ban "globalize the intifada" and "from the river to the sea". The legislation passed on 5 March 2026. The LNP and the KAP voted for it, while Labor and the Greens voted against it. Anyone found using or displaying either slogan faces penalties of up to two years in jail.

During the 2026 Victorian state election, the Liberals under Jess Wilson vowed to ban the term 'globalise the intifada' if elected.

== See also ==
- Laws governing public demonstrations in Australia
- 2024 Cumberland book ban
- Pornography in Australia
- Bans on Nazi symbols
