= Fritz Mandl =

Austrian armaments businessman (1900–1977)

- Mandl in a immigration file of the Federal Police of Brazil in 1958

Member of the Landtag of Lower Austria
- In office 1935–1945

Personal details
- Born: Friedrich Alexander Maria Mandl; 9 February 1900 Vienna, Austria-Hungary
- Died: 8 September 1977 (aged 77) Vienna, Austria
- Party: Fatherland Front
- Spouse: Helene Strauss (m. 1921; div. 1921) Hedy Lamarr (m. 1933; div. 1937) Herta Wrany (m. 1938; div. 1951) Gloria de Quaranta (m. 1951; div. 1957) Monika Brücklmeier (m. 1960)
- Children: 4
- Occupation: Industrialist, armament manufacturer, politician

Friedrich Alexander Maria Mandl, colloquially Fritz Mandl (9 February 1900 – 8 September 1977), was an Austrian industrialist, armament manufacturer, private investor and prominent fascist. He would be known as the King of Ammunition for leading the Hirtenberger ammunition concern.

Mandl was closely associated with Austrofascism, Fascist Italy as well as an opponent of Nazism. In the 1930s, he became an ally of Prince Ernst Rüdiger Starhemberg, then commander of the Austrian nationalist militia ("Heimwehr"), which he furnished with weapons and ammunition. He was once the richest Austrian.

== Early life and education ==
Mandl was born 9 February 1900 in Vienna, Austria-Hungary, the older of two children, to Alexander Mandl (1861–1943), an armament manufacturer, and Maria Mandl (née Mohr; 1873–1924). He had a younger sister, Renata Renée Ferro (née Mandl; 1901–1985).

His mother was Roman Catholic, his father was Jewish. In 1910, the family converted fully to Christianity. He completed high school at the Piaristengymnasium in Krems. During World War I, aged 18, he served one year as volunteer soldier, followed by chemistry studies.

== Career ==
In 1921, the Hirtenberger Ammunition Factory, supplied Poland with military goods during the war against Soviet Russia, leading to the factory being set on fire by communist workers. Additionally, the factory faced challenges throughout the 1920s due to the ban on weapons exports stipulated by the Treaty of Saint-Germain.

Mandl found ways to circumvent these obstacles. By 1924, he was managing the factory and became its general director in 1930. Later, he also became the owner of the Lichtenwörther Ammunition Factory and the Grünbach coal mines. In 1928, Mandl represented the Hirtenberger Ammunition Factory as the Austrian partner in a joint venture in Solothurn, Switzerland. The other partner was the large corporation Rheinmetall, the second-largest German arms manufacturer after Krupp, represented by weapons engineer Hans Eltze. The Solothurn Weapons Factory was used as a cover for the export of German and Austrian weapons, particularly anti-tank and anti-aircraft guns, under a Swiss label.

Mandl's empire stretched across several countries. He essentially had a monopoly on ammunition supplies to Italy. In Poland, he acquired a factory as recompense for the supplies provided during the Polish-Soviet War. He also owned an arms factory in Dordrecht, in southern Holland. In 1938, Mandl attempted to establish a munitions factory for the Portuguese War Ministry, but the pro-German lobby within the ministry opposed any agreement with the "Jew" Fritz Mandl and favored partnerships with German companies such as Fritz Werner AG.

The failure of this venture marked the slow decline of Mandl's political ties with fascist regimes, which began to lean toward Nazi Germany. Even his friend Mussolini could no longer be relied upon. His protégé Starhemberg, too, showed no gratitude, publishing a memoir in which Mandl played no role. Despite these setbacks, Mandl continued to try to improve his relations with Nazi Germany. He claimed that his involvement in the Austrofascist militia was not directed against the German Anschluss but rather against the socialists. He also spread the story that he was the son of an extramarital affair between his mother and a Catholic bishop, and thus not Jewish. Ultimately, he called on the workers at the Hirtenberger Ammunition Factory to vote in favor of the Anschluss.

Mandl's efforts to maintain his business empire from a safe distance in Switzerland led him to set up a Swiss company that acquired the assets of the Hirtenberger Ammunition Factory and Mandl's personal holdings. The Nazis were unable to seize his assets without causing diplomatic issues with Switzerland. They negotiated with Mandl at the Dolder Grand in Zürich, Switzerland, securing his father's release from German detention and guaranteeing him a substantial monthly pension.

Lamarr later wrote in Ecstasy and Me that both Italian dictator Benito Mussolini and German dictator Adolf Hitler attended Mandl's parties. However, Mandl had a personal quarrel with the Nazi minister Hermann Göring which, as well as his Jewish descent, led to the expropriation of his property in Europe. After the annexation of Austria by Nazi Germany in March 1938, Mandl transferred as many of his assets as he could to Swiss ownership, resigned as director-general of the munitions company and fled to Switzerland. He was forced to sell his business for £170,000 and 1.24 million Sperrmark to the German Wilhelm Gustloff Stiftung. The remaining property was seized.

== Political affairs ==
Mandl was also involved in political affairs, financing the Austrofascist Heimwehr militia, led by his friend Ernst Rüdiger Starhemberg. In 1935, he was elected to the Landtag of Lower Austria and became the chairman of the Lower Austrian Industrialists' Association. He used his close ties with Benito Mussolini and the Hungarian Horthy dictatorship to supply weapons to the Heimwehr. The infamous Hirtenberger Weapons Affair involved the smuggling of arms from Italy to Austria and Hungary in early 1933.

Mandl became friends with German Major Waldemar Pabst, the chief of staff of the Heimwehr, who had been involved in the double murder of Rosa Luxemburg and Karl Liebknecht and had participated in several coup attempts. Mandl and Eltze transferred the responsibility for the Solothurn arms factory to Pabst.

In 1933, after the Nazi Party came to power in Germany, Eltze moved to Germany, then to Spain and Portugal. Mandl fled to Argentina in 1938 after the Anschluss, as he was considered a Jew by the Nazis. He and Eltze left Pabst in charge of the Solothurn factory.

== Private life ==
In 1921, Mandl married Helene Hella Strauss (born 1899), aged 21. They divorced after only six weeks. His second marriage, in 1933, was to 18-year-old Hedwig "Hedy" Kiesler (later Hedy Lamarr). She was an Austrian actress who had sparked controversy after her appearance in the film Ecstasy (1933), in which she appeared nude for a few seconds and reportedly simulated sexual intercourse and orgasm.

Mandl required Kiesler to convert to Catholicism, which she did at their wedding in the Vienna Karlskirche. (Both of Kiesler's parents were born Jewish, though her mother converted to Catholicism at some point.) Mandl is rumoured to have attempted to bring a halt to her acting career in Germany. He reportedly spent US$280,000 ($6.96 million in 2025 dollars) in an unsuccessful attempt to suppress the film Ecstasy by purchasing every existing print. In her autobiography, Ecstasy and Me, Kiesler described Mandl as extremely controlling. She wrote that she escaped from him by disguising herself as a maid and fleeing to Paris, where she obtained a divorce. As Hedy Lamarr, Kiesler became a major star in Hollywood. The couple had no children.

In 1939, Mandl's third marrage was to Herta Anna Wrany (born 1911), with whom he moved to Argentina in 1938. It was the first time he had a true family life whilst following business interests in Argentina. There are two children from this marriage;

- Anna "Puppe" Mandl
- Fritz Mandl, Jr.

They were divorced in 1951. Shortly after that he married Argentinian Gloria de Quaranta (née Vinelli; 1922–1976). They were divorced in 1957. From this marriage he had another daughter:

- Renée Mandl (1952–1976)

His daughter and his ex-wife would die aboard Turkish Airlines Flight 452 which crashed near Antalya, Turkey on 19 September 1976. Mandl's fifth and final marriage was to Monika Brücklmeier (born 1938), daughter of Eduard Brücklmeier, an accessory executed for his involvement in the 20 July plot to assassinate Hitler. They had another daughter:

- Daughter (born 1968)

In the mid-1940s, Mandl moved to Brazil and then to Argentina. He arrived in Argentina as a "refugee", with his Rolls-Royce automobile, a court of maintainers, and a ton of gold bullion. He became a citizen and remarried in 1951. In Argentina, he opened factories and companies during Peronism. He served as an advisor to Juan Perón and attempted a new role as film producer. He founded a new airplane-manufacturing firm, Industria Metalúrgica y Plástica Argentina.

Mandl became a leading member of Argentina's social circles. He acquired a home in Mar del Plata, a castle in Córdoba and a small hotel in Buenos Aires. He worked closely with French designer Jean-Michel Frank, who was then artistic director of Comte S.A., which produced most of Mandl's furnishings.

== Return to Austria ==
Mandl had to close his businesses in Argentina when Americans harassed him on suspicion of his being a Nazi. In 1955 after the fall of Peronism in Argentina, he left for Austria where he resumed running the Hirtenberg-based factory he had inherited from his father. He died in Vienna in 1977. After his death, a dispute broke out over his inheritance that took years to resolve.

== General references ==
- Bill, Ramón. Waffenfabrik Solothurn. Schweizerische Präzision im Dienste der deutschen Rüstungsindustrie. In: Schriftenreihe des Kantonalen Museums Altes Zeughaus Solothurn, Heft 14. Solothurn, 2002
- Hug, Peter. Schweizer Rüstungsindustrie und Kriegsmaterialhandel zur Zeit des Nationalsozialismus. Unternehmensstrategien – Marktentwicklung – politische Überwachung. Zurich: Chronos Verlag, Band 11 der Publikationen der Unabhängigen Expertenkommission, 2002.
- Kerekes, Lajos. Abenddämmerung einer Demokratie. Mussolini, Gömbös und die Heimwehr. Wien-Frankfurt-Zürich: Europa Verlag, 1966.
- Louçã, António. Conspiradores e traficantes. Portugal no tráfico de armas e de divisas nos anos do nazismo. 1933–1945. Lisbon: Oficina do Livro, 2005.
- Hanauska, Fritz. Heimatbuch der Marktgemeinde Hirtenberg. Marktgemeinde Hirtenberg, Hirtenberg 1980
