= John Harcourt =

John Harcourt may refer to:

- J. M. Harcourt (John Mewton Harcourt), Australian writer
- John Simon Harcourt, British member of parliament
- John Harcourt (MP, died 1825), British member of parliament for Ilchester, and for Leominster
