= Hedy Lamarr =

Austrian-American actress and inventor (1914–2000)

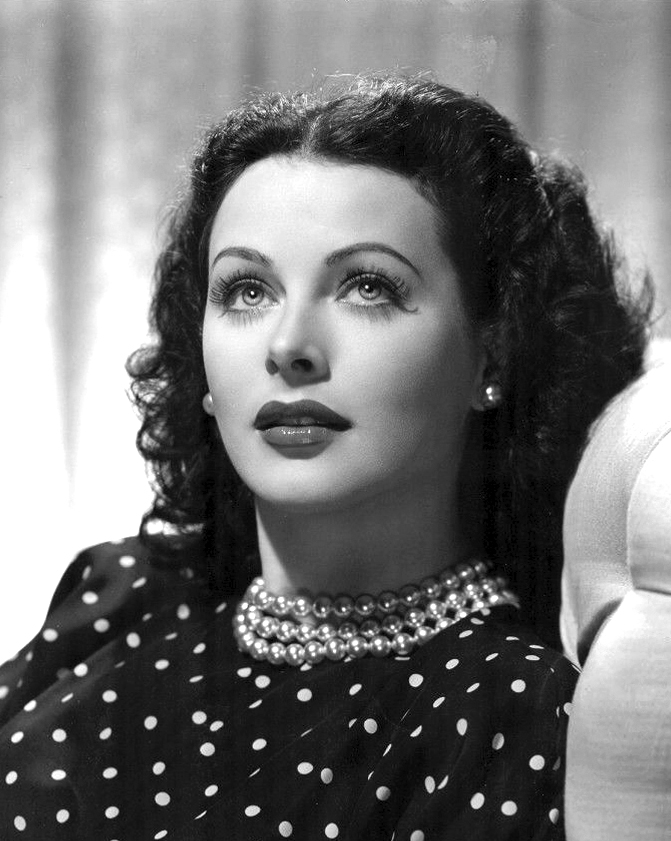
- Lamarr, c. 1944
- Born: Hedwig Eva Maria Kiesler; November 9, 1914; Vienna, Austria-Hungary
- Died: January 19, 2000 (aged 85); Casselberry, Florida, US
- Citizenship: Austria (until 1938); Stateless (1938–1953); US (from 1953)
- Occupations: Actress; inventor
- Years active: 1930–1958
- Spouses: Friedrich Mandl (m. 1933; div. 1937) Gene Markey (m. 1939; div. 1941) John Loder (m. 1943; div. 1947) Teddy Stauffer (m. 1951; div. 1952) W. Howard Lee (m. 1953; div. 1960) Lewis J. Boies (m. 1963; div. 1965)
- Children: 3

Hedy Lamarr (/ˈhɛdi/; born Hedwig Eva Maria Kiesler; November 9, 1914 (Note: According to Lamarr biographer Stephen Michael Shearer (pp. 8, 339), she was born in 1914, not 1913.) – January 19, 2000) was an Austrian and American actress and inventor. Regarded as a successful film star, she also co-invented a radio guidance system during World War II.

After a brief early film career in Czechoslovakia, including the controversial erotic romantic drama Ecstasy (1933), she fled from her first husband, Friedrich Mandl, and secretly moved to Paris. Traveling to London, she met Louis B. Mayer, who offered her a film contract in Hollywood. Lamarr became a film star with her performance in the romantic drama Algiers (1938). She achieved further success with the Western Boom Town (1940) and the drama White Cargo (1942). Lamarr's most successful film was the religious epic Samson and Delilah (1949). She also acted on television before the release of her final film in 1958. She was honored with a star on the Hollywood Walk of Fame in 1960.

At the beginning of World War II, along with composer George Antheil, Lamarr co-invented a radio guidance system for Allied torpedoes that used spread spectrum and frequency hopping technology to defeat the threat of radio jamming by the Axis powers. This approach, conceptualized as a "Secret Communication System", was intended to provide secure, jam-resistant communication for weapon guidance by spreading the signal across multiple frequencies. Similar technology was used in operational systems only beginning in 1962, which was well after World War II and three years after the expiry of the Lamarr–Antheil patent. Frequency hopping, which existed and was utilized before the Lamarr–Antheil patent, is a foundational technology for spread-spectrum communications. Its principles are utilized for secure wireless networking, including Bluetooth and early versions of Wi-Fi, which use variants of spread spectrum to protect data from interception and interference.

== Early life ==
Lamarr was born Hedwig Eva Maria Kiesler in 1914 in Vienna, the only child of Gertrud "Trude" Kiesler (née Lichtwitz) and Emil Kiesler.

Her father was born to a Galician-Jewish family in Lemberg in the Kingdom of Galicia and Lodomeria, part of Austria-Hungary (now Lviv in Ukraine) and was, in the 1920s, deputy director of Wiener Bankverein, and at the end of his life a director at the united Creditanstalt-Bankverein. Her mother, a pianist and a native of Budapest, in the Kingdom of Hungary, had come from an upper-class Hungarian-Jewish family. She had converted to Catholicism and was described as a "practicing Christian" who raised her daughter as a Christian, although Hedy was not baptized at the time.

As a child, Lamarr showed an interest in acting and was fascinated by theater and film. At the age of 12, she won a beauty contest in Vienna. She also began to learn about technological inventions with her father, who would take her out on walks, explaining how devices functioned.

== Film career ==
=== Europe ===
Lamarr was taking acting classes in Vienna when one day, she forged a note from her mother and went to Sascha-Film and was able to have herself hired as a script girl. While there, she had a role as an extra in the romantic comedy Money on the Street (1930), and then a small speaking part in the comedy Storm in a Water Glass (1931). Producer Max Reinhardt then cast her in a play entitled The Weaker Sex, which was performed at the Theater in der Josefstadt. Reinhardt was so impressed with her that he brought her with him back to Berlin.

However, she never actually trained with Reinhardt or appeared in any of his Berlin productions. Instead, she met the Russian theatre producer Alexis Granowsky, who cast her in his film directorial debut, The Trunks of Mr. O.F. (1931), starring Walter Abel and Peter Lorre. Granowsky soon moved to Paris, but Lamarr stayed in Berlin and was given the lead role in No Money Needed (1932), a comedy directed by Carl Boese. Lamarr then starred in the film which made her internationally famous.

==== Ecstasy ====
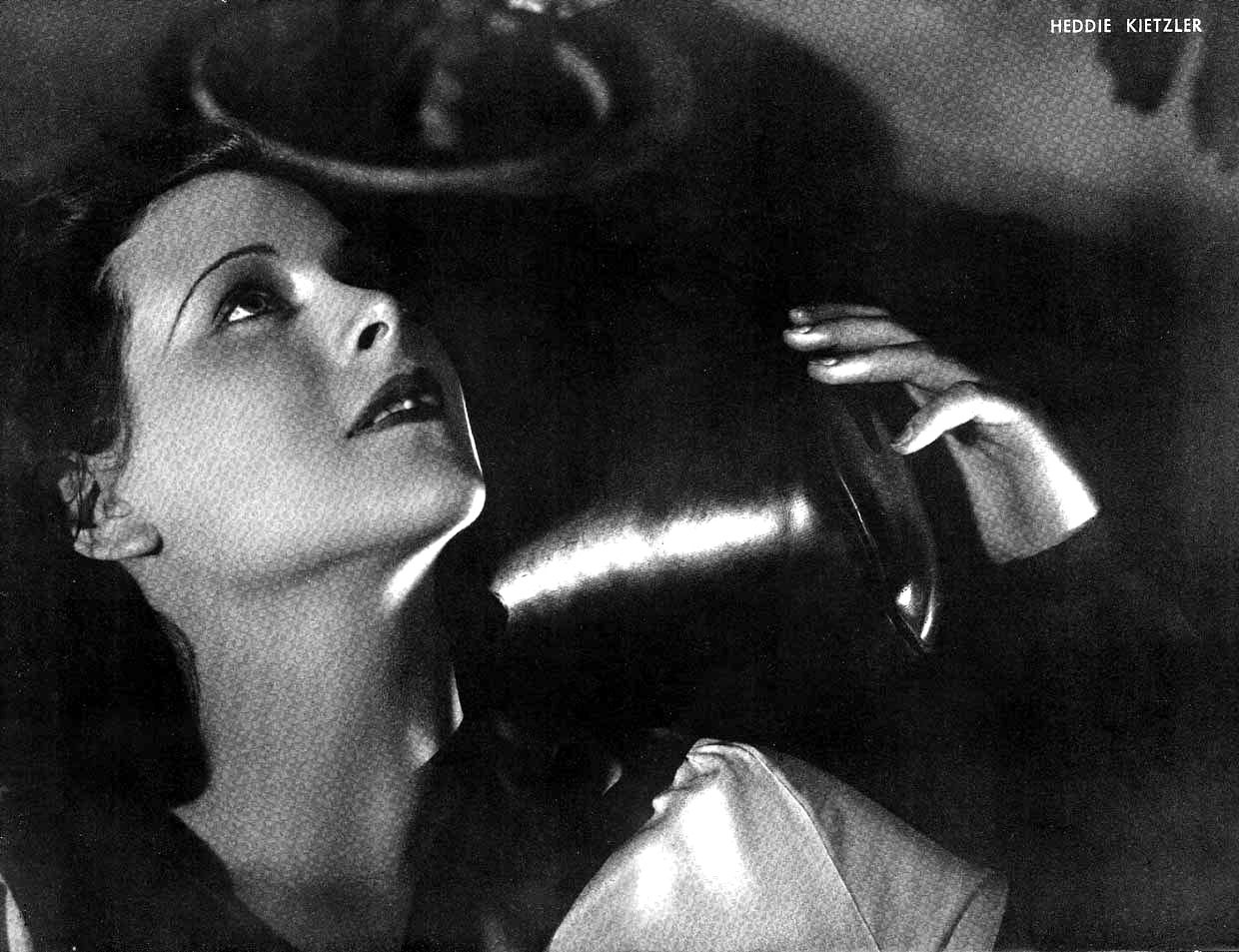
Lamarr in a 1934 publicity photo with the name "Heddie Kietzler"

In early 1933 at age 18, Lamarr was given the lead in Gustav Machatý's film Ecstasy (Ekstase in German, Extase in Czech). She played the neglected young wife of an indifferent older man.

The film became both celebrated and notorious for showing Lamarr's face in the throes of orgasm as well as close-up and brief scenes of nudity. Lamarr claimed she was "duped" by the director and producer, who used high-power telephoto lenses, although the director contested her claims. (Note: When Lamarr applied for the role, she had little experience nor understood the planned filming. Anxious for the job, she signed the contract without reading it. When, during an outdoor scene, the director told her to disrobe, she protested and threatened to quit, but he said that if she refused, she would have to pay for the cost of all the scenes already filmed. To calm her, he said they were using "long shots" in any case, and no intimate details would be visible. At the preview in Prague, sitting next to the director, when she saw the numerous close-ups produced with telephoto lenses, she screamed at him for tricking her. She left the theater in tears, worried about her parents' reaction and that it might have ruined her budding career. However, the cinematographer of the film claimed that she was aware during filming that there would be nude scenes and did not raise concerns during filming.)

Although she was dismayed and now disillusioned about taking other roles, the film gained world recognition after winning an award at the Venice Film Festival. Throughout Europe, it was regarded as an artistic work. In America, it was considered overly sexual and received negative publicity, especially among women's groups. It was banned there and in Germany.

==== Withdrawal ====
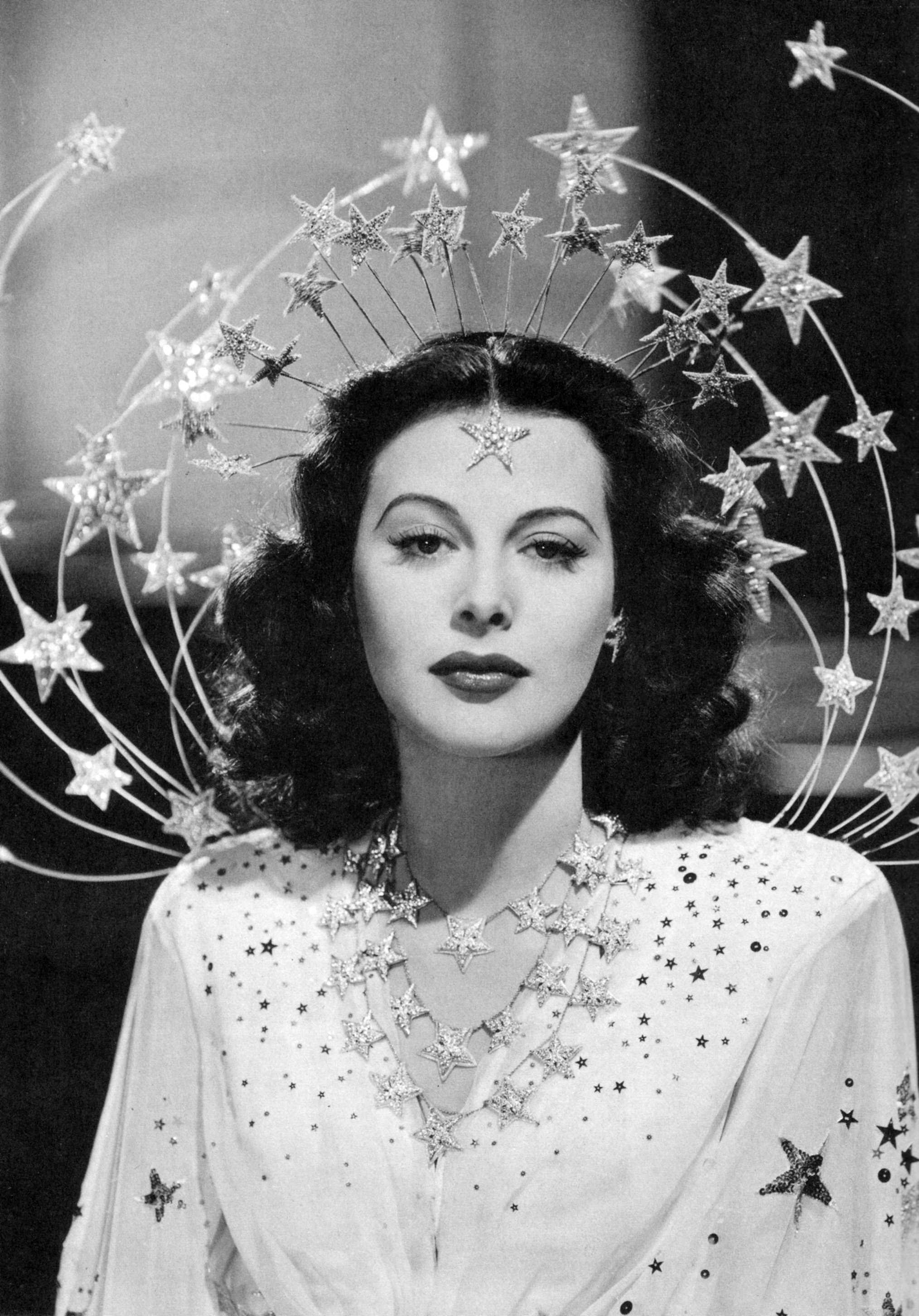
Studio publicity still of Lamarr for the film Ziegfeld Girl (1941)

Lamarr played a number of stage roles, including a starring one in Sissy, a play about Empress Elisabeth of Austria produced in Vienna. It won accolades from critics. Admirers sent roses to her dressing room and tried to get backstage to meet her. She sent most of them away, including a man who was more insistent, Friedrich Mandl. He became obsessed with getting to know her.

Mandl was an Austrian military arms merchant and munitions manufacturer who was reputedly the third-richest man in Austria. She fell for his charming and fascinating personality, partly due to his immense financial wealth. Her parents, both of Jewish descent, did not approve due to Mandl's ties to Italian fascist leader Benito Mussolini and, later, German Führer Adolf Hitler, but they could not stop the headstrong Lamarr.

On August 10, 1933, Lamarr married Mandl at the Karlskirche. She was 18 years old and he was 33. In Lamarr's ghostwritten autobiography, Ecstasy and Me, Mandl is described as an extremely controlling husband who strongly objected to her simulated orgasm scene in Ecstasy and prevented her from pursuing her acting career. She claimed she was kept a virtual prisoner in their castle home, Schloss Schwarzenau.

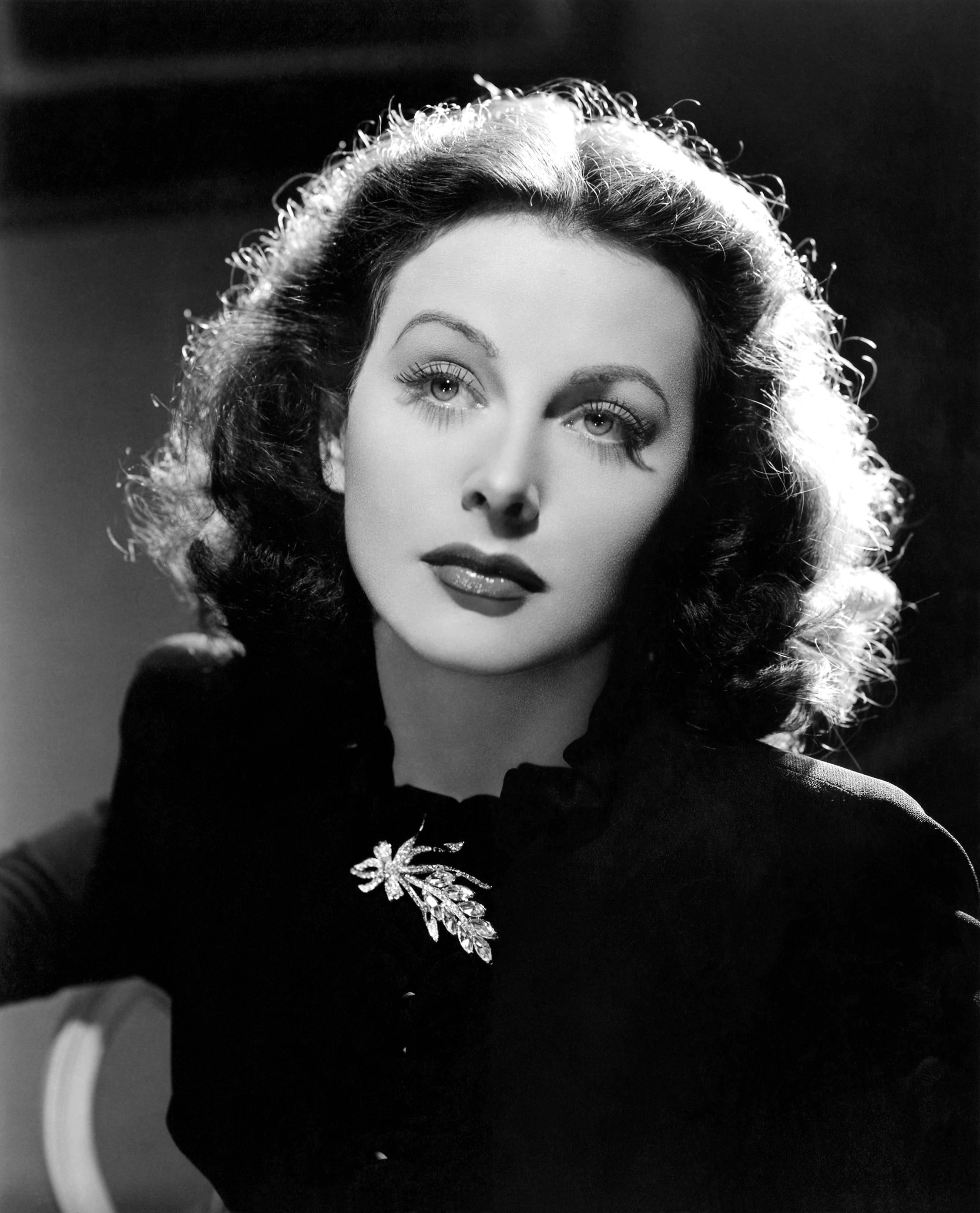
Hedy Lamarr, 1944

Mandl had close social and business ties to the Italian government, selling munitions to the country, and had ties to the Nazi regime of Germany as well, even though his own father was Jewish, as was Hedy's. Lamarr wrote that the dictators of both countries attended lavish parties at the Mandl home. Lamarr accompanied Mandl to business meetings, where he conferred with scientists and other professionals involved in military technology. These conferences were her introduction to the field of applied science and nurtured her latent talent in science.

Lamarr's marriage to Mandl eventually became unbearable and she decided to separate herself from both her husband and country in 1937. In her autobiography, she wrote that she disguised herself as her maid and fled to Paris, but according to other accounts she persuaded Mandl to let her wear all of her jewelry for a dinner party and then disappeared afterward. She wrote about her marriage:

I knew very soon that I could never be an actress while I was his wife. ... He was the absolute monarch in his marriage. ... I was like a doll. I was like a thing, some object of art which had to be guarded—and imprisoned—having no mind, no life of its own.

=== Hollywood ===
==== Algiers and her first MGM films ====
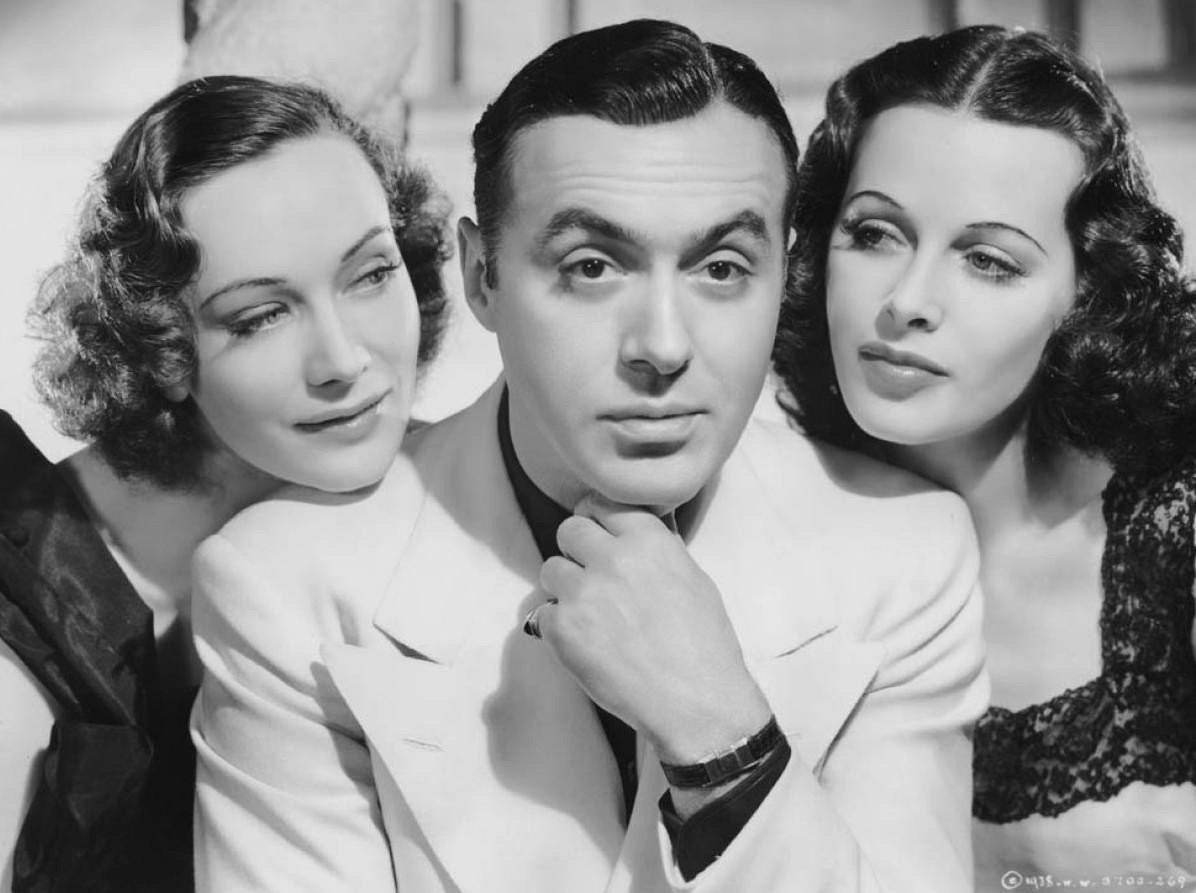
Sigrid Gurie (left) and Hedy Lamarr (right) were Charles Boyer's leading ladies in Algiers (1938).

After arriving in London in 1937, she met Louis B. Mayer, head of MGM, who was scouting for talent in Europe. She initially turned down the offer he made her (of $125 a week), but then booked herself onto the same New York–bound liner as him, and she managed to impress him enough to secure a $500-a-week contract. Mayer persuaded her to change her name to Hedy Lamarr (to distance herself from her real identity and "the Ecstasy lady" reputation associated with it), choosing the surname in homage to the beautiful silent film star Barbara La Marr, on the suggestion of his wife, who admired La Marr. He brought her to Hollywood in 1938 and began promoting her as the "world's most beautiful woman".

Mayer loaned Lamarr to producer Walter Wanger, who was making Algiers (1938), an American version of the French film Pépé le Moko (1937). Lamarr was cast in the lead opposite Charles Boyer. The film created a "national sensation", says Shearer. She was billed as an unknown but well-publicized Austrian actress, which created anticipation in audiences. Mayer hoped she would become another Greta Garbo or Marlene Dietrich. According to one viewer, when her face first appeared on the screen, "everyone gasped ... Lamarr's beauty literally took one's breath away."

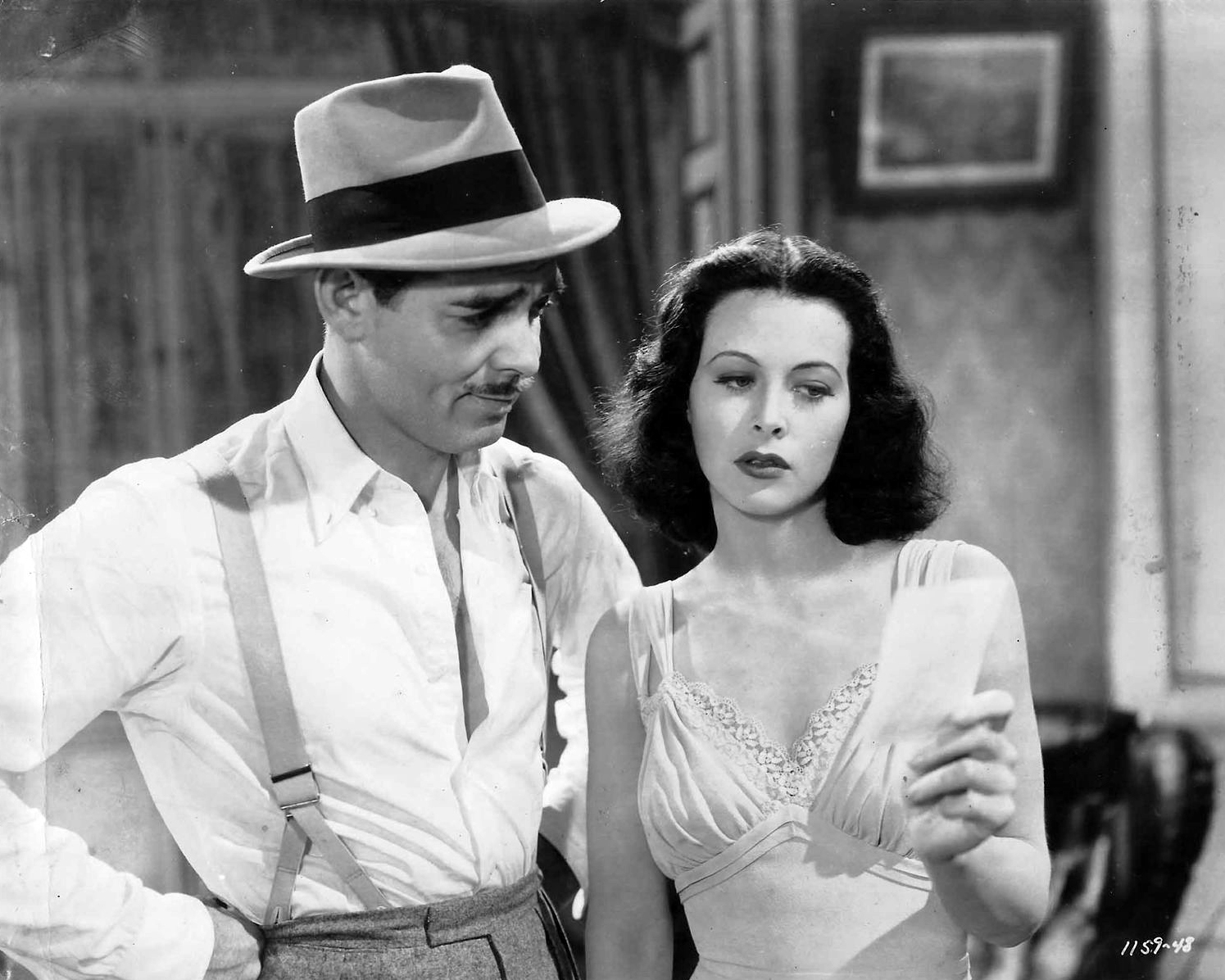
Clark Gable and Lamarr in Comrade X (1940)

Her off-screen life and personality during her Hollywood years was quite different from her screen image. She spent much of her time feeling lonely and homesick. She might swim at her agent's pool, but shunned the beaches and staring crowds. When asked for an autograph, she wondered why anyone would want it. In December 1938, writer Howard Sharpe interviewed her and gave his impression:

Hedy has the most incredible personal sophistication. She knows the peculiarly European art of being womanly; she knows what men want in a beautiful woman, what attracts them, and she forces herself to be these things. She has magnetism with warmth, something that neither Dietrich nor Garbo has managed to achieve.

In future Hollywood films, she was frequently typecast as the archetypal glamorous seductress of exotic origin. Her second American film was to be I Take This Woman, co-starring with Spencer Tracy under the direction of regular Dietrich collaborator Josef von Sternberg. Von Sternberg was fired during the shoot, replaced by Frank Borzage. The film was put on hold, and Lamarr was put into Lady of the Tropics (1939), where she played a mixed-race seductress in Saigon opposite Robert Taylor. She returned to I Take This Woman, re-shot by W. S. Van Dyke. Lamarr later remembered the filming of I Take This Woman: "We were seated around a table one day, rehearsing our lines. It was my first Metro film, and little Hedy was learning English, when Spencer turned to me and said, briskly, 'Get me a taxi.' I obligingly arose and started to walk toward the sound‐stage door, not realizing that it was the next line in the script. He was a great actor, but there were times when he made me cry. He was not precisely my favorite person."

==== MGM successes ====
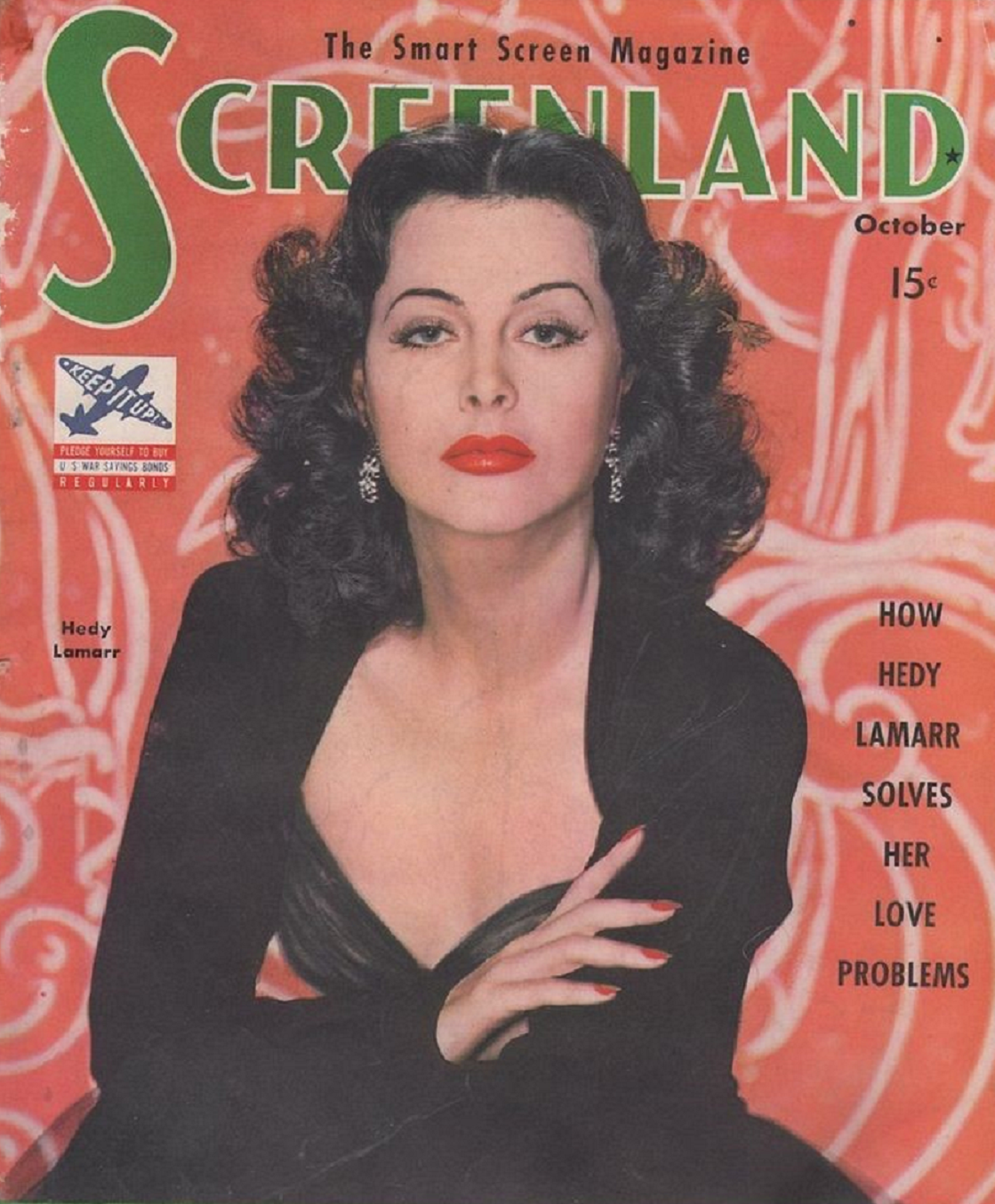
Lamarr on the cover of Screenland, October 1942

In Boom Town (1940), one of her most popular films, she co-starred with Clark Gable, Claudette Colbert and Spencer Tracy; it made $5 million. Of her co-stars, Lamarr said, "Clark Gable, so warm and friendly to the insecure actress … Claudette Colbert, such a lady to me, although much higher in the MGM pecking order." MGM promptly reteamed Lamarr and Gable in Comrade X (1940), a comedy film in the vein of Ninotchka (1939), which was another hit. She got along well with Gable: "Although I never quite understood his sex appeal, I thought he was one of the nicest people I'd met, and a great practical joker."

Lamarr was teamed with James Stewart in Come Live with Me (1941), playing a Viennese refugee. She described Stewart as "one of the sweetest men in the world" and also liked the film because it was different from her previous ones: "I was so happy about this picture, it was my first chance to do a charming, humorous story. Until then, my image was that of an exotic creature." Stewart was also in Ziegfeld Girl (1941), where Lamarr, Judy Garland and Lana Turner played aspiring showgirls—a big success.

Lamarr was top-billed in H. M. Pulham, Esq. (1941), although the film's protagonist was the title role played by Robert Young. She made a third film with Tracy, Tortilla Flat (1942), which also co-starred John Garfield. Lamarr recalled, "John Garfield was wonderful to work with. He later told Life magazine, 'I tried to steal scenes from Hedy, Hedy tried to steal them from Frank, Frank tried to steal them from me, and the dogs (Morgan's) stole the show.'" It was successful at the box office, as was Crossroads (1942) with William Powell.

Lamarr played the exotic Arab seductress Tondelayo in White Cargo (1942), top billed over Walter Pidgeon. It was a huge hit. Lamarr had a dance number in the film: "I was proud of my authentic African dance, which I rehearsed for weeks, and which gave me splinters in my feet. It was done with a bed showing in the background, and it was so sexy almost all of the scene was cut. How I'd like to own that footage today!" White Cargo contains arguably her most memorable film quote, delivered with provocative invitation: "I am Tondelayo. I make tiffin for you?" This line typifies many of Lamarr's roles, which emphasized her beauty and sensuality while giving her relatively few lines. The lack of acting challenges bored Lamarr. She reportedly took up inventing to relieve her boredom.

==== Final MGM films and loan-outs ====
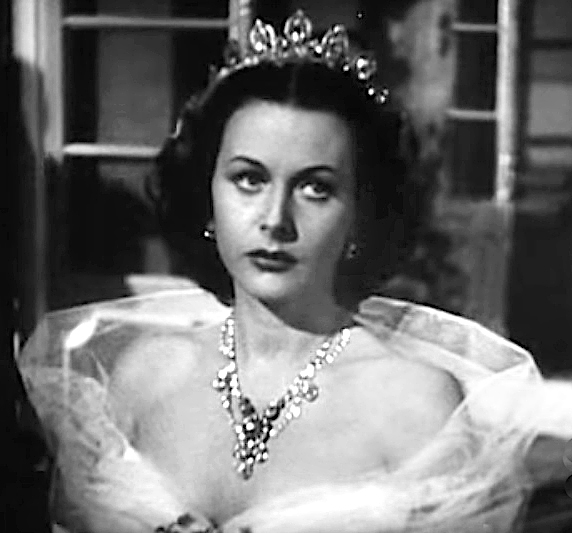
Lamarr in Her Highness and the Bellboy (1945)

Lamarr turned down the leading female roles in the 20th Century-Fox film noir Laura and the MGM melodrama Gaslight (both 1944). She was reunited with Powell in a comedy The Heavenly Body (1944), then was borrowed by Warner Bros for a top-billed role in The Conspirators (1944), co-starring fellow Austrian actor Paul Henreid. This was an attempt to repeat the success of Casablanca (1943), and RKO borrowed her for a melodrama Experiment Perilous (1944).

Back at MGM Lamarr was teamed with Robert Walker in the romantic comedy Her Highness and the Bellboy (1945), playing a princess who falls in love with a New Yorker. It was very popular, but would be the last film she made under her MGM contract. She said of the film, "There I am, eight months pregnant, being photographed behind potted palms and in full ball gowns, which fortunately fit the story."

Biographer Richard Rhodes describes her assimilation into American culture:

Of all the European émigrés who escaped Nazi Germany and Nazi Austria, she was one of the very few who succeeded in moving to another culture and becoming a full-fledged star herself. There were so very few who could make the transition linguistically or culturally. She really was a resourceful human being–I think because of her father's strong influence on her as a child.

Lamarr also had a penchant for speaking about herself in the third person.

==== Wartime fundraiser ====
Lamarr wanted to join the National Inventors Council, but was reportedly told by NIC member Charles F. Kettering and others that she could better help the war effort by using her celebrity status to sell war bonds.

She participated in a war-bond-selling campaign with a sailor named Eddie Rhodes. Rhodes was in the crowd at each Lamarr appearance, and she would call him up on stage. She would briefly flirt with him before asking the audience if she should give him a kiss. The crowd would say yes, to which Hedy would reply that she would if enough people bought war bonds. After enough bonds were purchased, she would kiss Rhodes and he would head back into the audience. Then they would head off to the next war bond rally.

==== Samson and Delilah and later films ====
After the war, she starred in a comedy with Robert Cummings, Let's Live a Little (1948). Lamarr enjoyed her biggest success playing Delilah against Victor Mature as the Biblical strongman in Cecil B. DeMille's Samson and Delilah, the highest-grossing film of 1950. The film won two Oscars.

Lamarr returned to MGM for a film noir with John Hodiak, A Lady Without Passport (1950), which flopped. More popular were two pictures she made at Paramount, a Western with Ray Milland, Copper Canyon (1950), and a Bob Hope spy spoof, My Favorite Spy (1951).

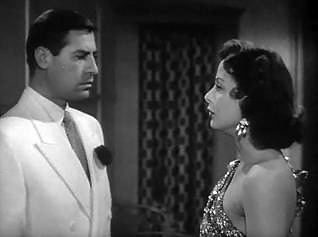
With John Hodiak in A Lady Without Passport (1950)

Her career went into decline. She went to Italy to play multiple roles in Loves of Three Queens (1954), which she also produced. However she lacked the experience necessary to make a success of such an epic production, and lost millions of dollars when she was unable to secure distribution of the picture.

She played Joan of Arc in Irwin Allen's critically panned epic, The Story of Mankind (1957) and did episodes of Zane Grey Theatre ("Proud Woman") and Shower of Stars ("Cloak and Dagger"). Her last film was a thriller The Female Animal (1958).

Lamarr was signed to act in the 1966 film Picture Mommy Dead, but was let go when she collapsed during filming from nervous exhaustion. She was replaced in the role of Jessica Flagmore Shelley by Zsa Zsa Gabor.

== Producer ==
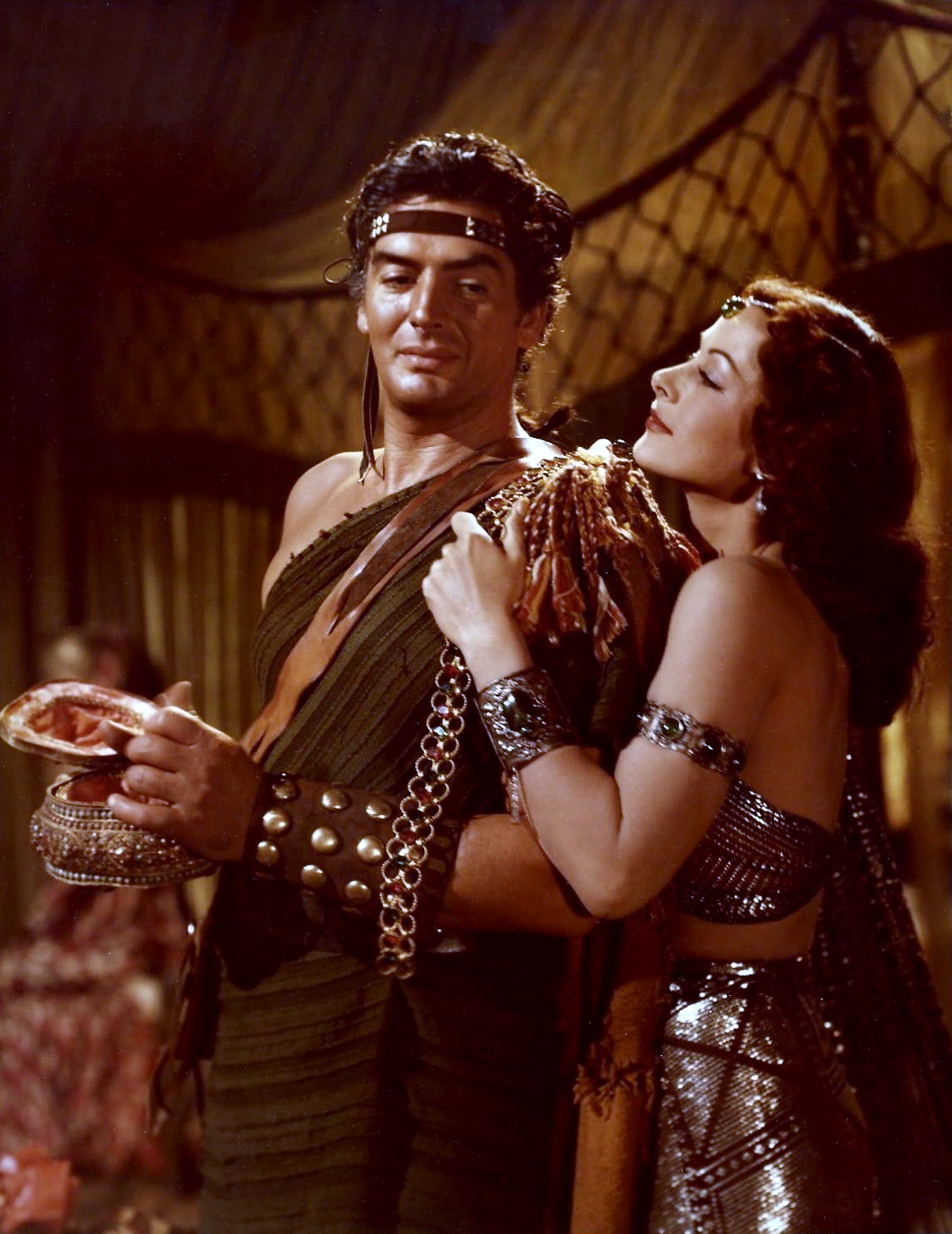
Victor Mature and Lamarr in Samson and Delilah (1949)

After leaving MGM in 1945, Lamarr formed a production company with Jack Chertok and made the thriller The Strange Woman (1946), an adaptation of a novel of the same title by Ben Ames Williams. Lamarr's performance won praise from critics. The New York Times wrote, "Undoubtedly every actress this side of ten yearns for a tour de force and Hedy Lamarr […] can consider that yearning wholly realized. For the somber drama of a suave sinner in Bangor, Me., of a century ago affords Miss Lamarr her meatiest assignment in years, a chance at large chunks of choice dialogue."

She and Chertok then made Dishonored Lady (1947), another thriller starring Lamarr.

== Inventing career ==
Although Hedy Lamarr was widely celebrated for her acting career, her technological achievements were not fully recognized until decades later. The frequency-hopping system she co-developed with George Antheil became foundational to later spread spectrum communications technology.

Modern wireless systems such as Bluetooth, Wi-Fi, GPS, and some secure military communication systems use principles related to spread spectrum transmission. In 1997, Lamarr received the Electronic Frontier Foundation Pioneer Award, helping bring renewed attention to her role as an inventor. Lamarr had no formal training and was primarily self-taught, she invested her spare time, including on set between takes, in designing and drafting inventions, which included an improved traffic stoplight and a tablet that would dissolve in water to create a flavored carbonated drink.

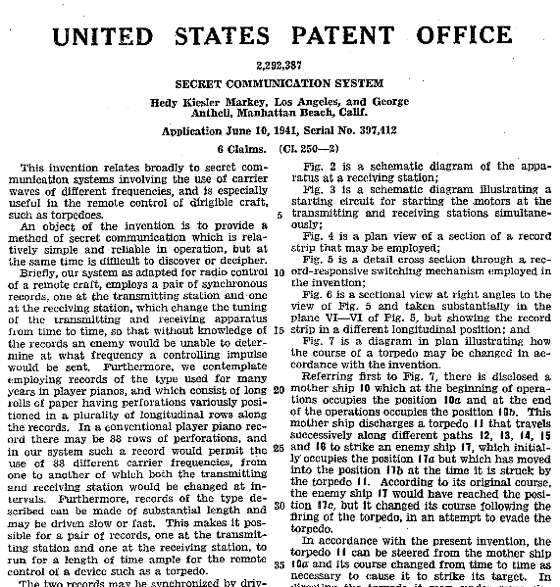
Copy of U.S. patent for "Secret Communication System"

During the late 1930s, Lamarr attended arms deals with her then-husband, arms dealer Fritz Mandl, "possibly to improve his chances of making a sale". From the meetings, she learned that navies needed "a way to guide a torpedo as it raced through the water." Radio control had been proposed. However, an enemy might be able to jam such a torpedo's guidance system and set it off course.

When later discussing this with a new friend, composer and pianist George Antheil, her idea to prevent jamming by frequency hopping met Antheil's previous work in music. In that earlier work, Antheil attempted synchronizing note-hopping in the avant-garde piece written as a score for the film Ballet Mécanique (1923–24) that involved multiple synchronized player pianos. Antheil's idea in the piece was to synchronize the start time of four player pianos with matching player piano rolls, so the pianos would play in time with one another. Together, they realized that radio frequencies could be changed similarly, using the same kind of mechanism, but miniaturized.

Based on the strength of the initial submission of their ideas to the National Inventors Council (NIC) in late December 1940, in early 1941 the NIC introduced Antheil to Samuel Stuart Mackeown, professor of Electrical Engineering at Caltech, to consult on the electrical systems. Lamarr hired the legal firm of Lyon & Lyon to draft the application for the patent which was granted as U.S. patent 2,292,387 on August 11, 1942, under her legal name Hedy Kiesler Markey. The invention was proposed to the Navy, who rejected it on the basis that it would be too large to fit in a torpedo, and Lamarr and Antheil, shunned by the Navy, pursued their invention no further. It was suggested that Lamarr invest her time and attention to selling war bonds since she was a celebrity.

== Later years ==
Lamarr became a naturalized citizen of the United States at age 38 on April 10, 1953. Her autobiography, Ecstasy and Me, was published in 1966. She said on TV that it was not written by her, and much of it was fictional. Lamarr later sued the publisher, saying that many details were fabricated by its ghost writer, Leo Guild. Lamarr, in turn, was sued by Gene Ringgold, who asserted that the book plagiarized material from an article he had written in 1965 for Screen Facts magazine.

In the late 1950s, along with former husband W. Howard Lee, Lamarr designed and developed the Villa LaMarr ski resort in Aspen, Colorado.

In 1966, Lamarr was arrested in Los Angeles for shoplifting. The charges were eventually dropped. In 1991, she was arrested on the same charge in Orlando, Florida, this time for stealing $21.48 worth of laxatives and eye drops. She pleaded no contest to avoid a court appearance, and the charges were dropped in return for her promise to refrain from breaking any laws for a year.

=== Seclusion ===
The 1970s was a decade of increasing seclusion for Lamarr. She was offered several scripts, television commercials, and stage projects, but none piqued her interest. In 1974, she filed a $10 million lawsuit against Warner Bros., claiming that the running parody of her name ("Hedley Lamarr") in the Mel Brooks comedy Blazing Saddles infringed her right to privacy. Brooks said he was flattered. The studio settled out of court for an undisclosed nominal sum and an apology to Lamarr for "almost using her name". Brooks said that Lamarr "never got the joke". In 1981, with her eyesight failing, Lamarr retreated from public life and settled in Miami Beach, Florida.

A large Corel-drawn image of Lamarr won CorelDRAW's yearly software suite cover design contest in 1996. For several years, beginning in 1997, it was featured on boxes of the software suite. Lamarr sued the company for using her image without her permission. Corel countered that she did not own rights to the image. The parties reached an undisclosed settlement in 1998.

For her contribution to the motion picture industry, Lamarr has a star on the Hollywood Walk of Fame at 6247 Hollywood Boulevard adjacent to Vine Street where the walk is centered.

Lamarr became estranged from her older son, James Lamarr Loder, when he was 12 years old. Their relationship ended abruptly, and he moved in with another family. They did not speak again for almost 50 years. Lamarr left James Loder out of her will, and he sued for control of the US$3.3 million estate left by Lamarr in 2000. He eventually settled for US$50,000.

In her later years, Lamarr lived in Altamonte Springs, Florida, before moving to Casselberry, Florida, in the final months of her life. She communicated with family and friends almost exclusively by telephone. However, after moving to Casselberry, two friends who lived nearby would visit her at home to check on her a few times a week.

=== Death ===
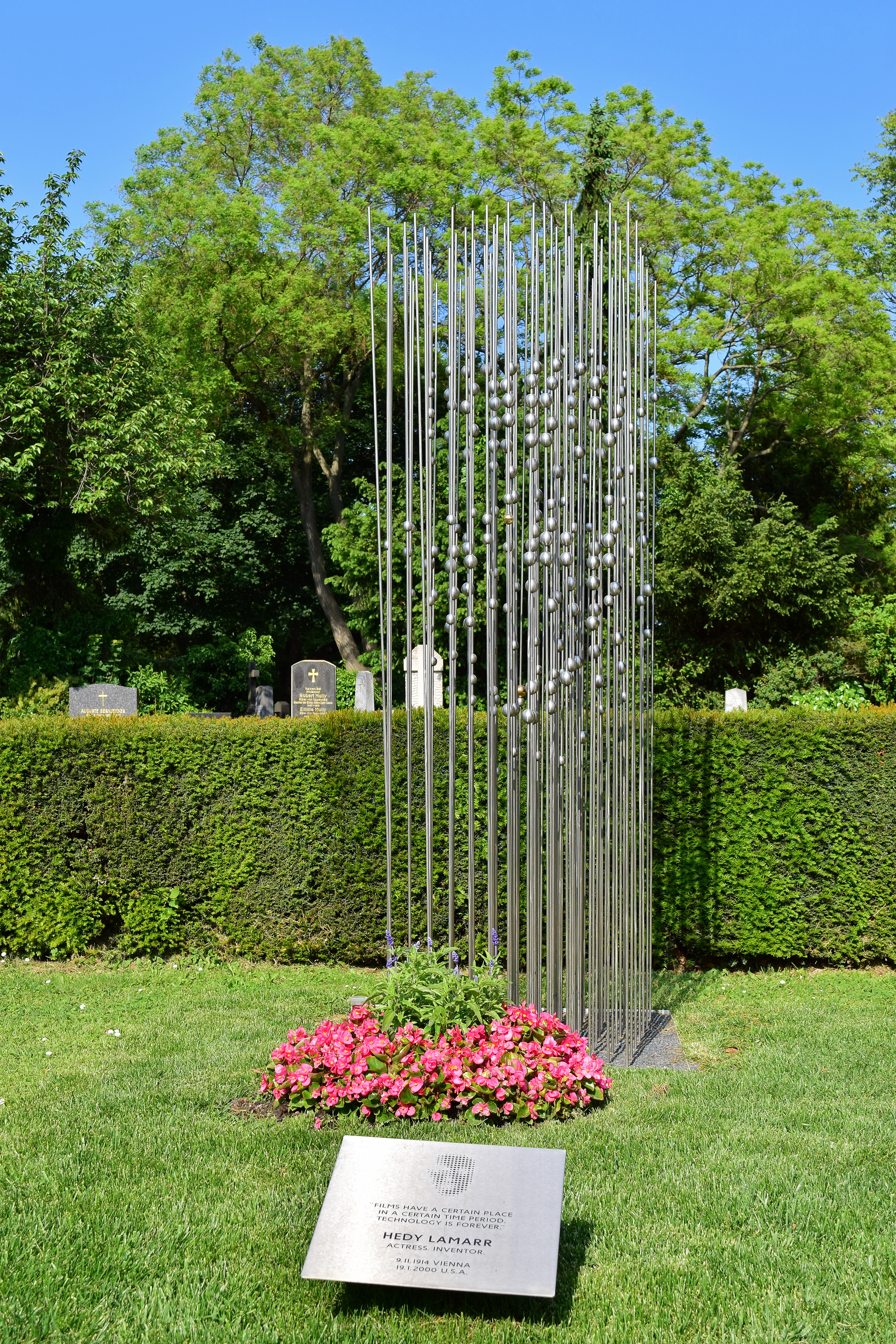
Memorial to Hedy Lamarr at Vienna's Central Cemetery (Group 33G, Tomb n°80)

On January 19, 2000, Lamarr was found dead at her home in Casselberry at the age of 85; the cause of death was heart disease. Her son Anthony Loder spread part of her ashes in Austria's Vienna Woods in accordance with her last wishes.

In 2014, a memorial to Lamarr was unveiled in Vienna's Central Cemetery. The remainder of her ashes were buried there.

== Marriages and children ==
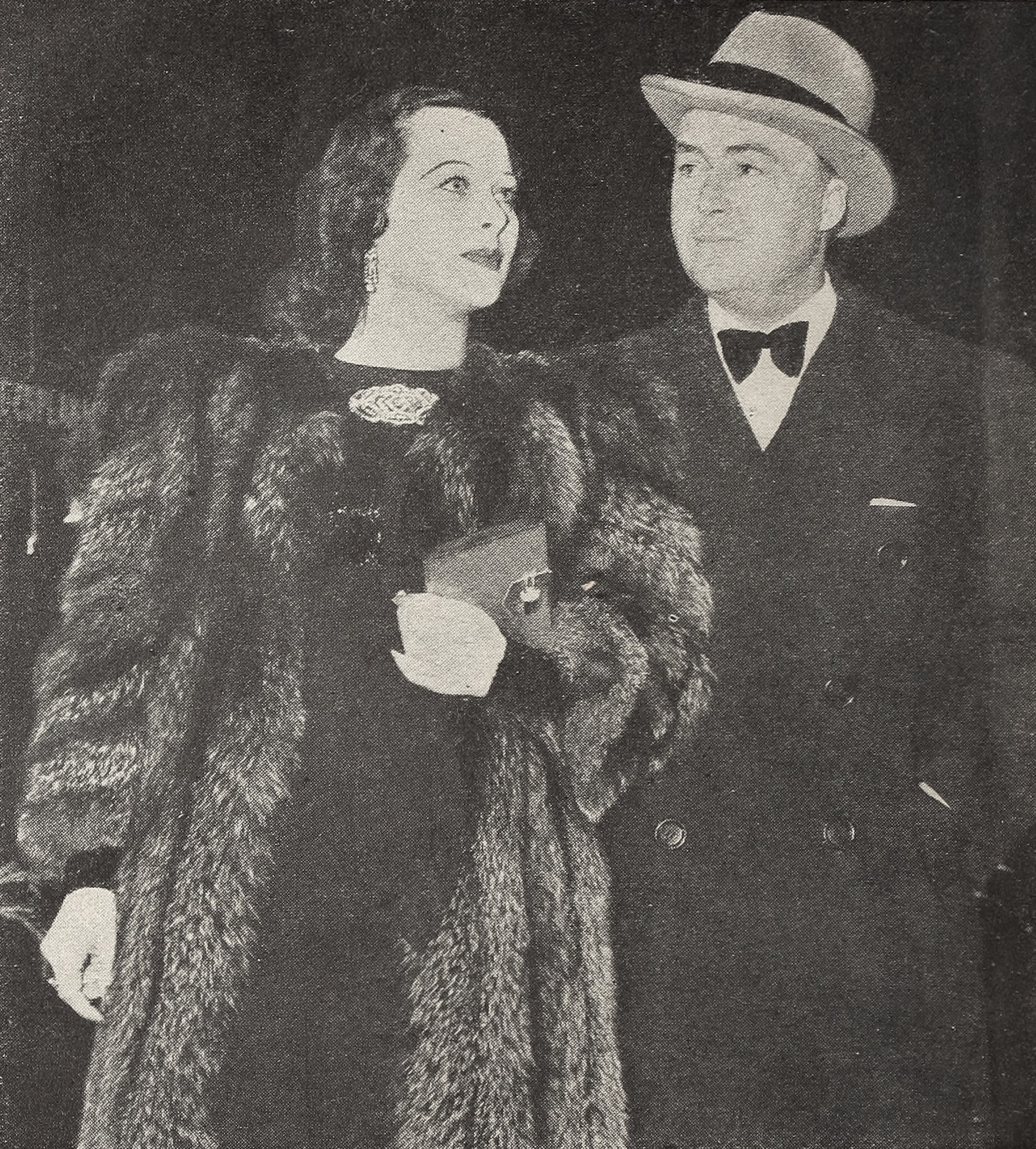
Lamarr and her second husband, Gene Markey, in 1939.

Lamarr was married and divorced six times and had three children:

1. Friedrich Mandl (married 1933–1937), chairman of the Hirtenberger Patronen-Fabrik
2. Gene Markey (married 1939–1941), screenwriter and producer. She adopted a boy (however this was later contested by the child, see below) during her marriage with Markey. Lamarr became estranged from the boy when he was 12 years old, their relationship ended abruptly, they did not speak again for almost 50 years, and Lamarr left him out of her will. Lamarr and Markey lived at 2727 Benedict Canyon Drive in Beverly Hills, California during their marriage, at a place called Hedgerow Farm. The home still exists.
3. John Loder (married 1943–1947), actor. The two had a daughter, Denise, who married Larry Colton, a writer and former baseball player, and a son, Anthony, who worked for illustrator James McMullan. Anthony Loder was featured in the 2004 documentary film Calling Hedy Lamarr.
4. Ernest "Teddy" Stauffer (married 1951–1952), nightclub owner, restaurateur, and former bandleader
5. W. Howard Lee (married 1953–1960), a Texas oilman (who later married film actress Gene Tierney)
6. Lewis J. Boies (married 1963–1965), Lamarr's divorce lawyer

Following her sixth and final divorce in 1965, Lamarr remained unmarried for the last 35 years of her life.

Throughout her life, Lamarr claimed that her first son, James Lamarr Loder, was not biologically related to her and was adopted during her marriage to Gene Markey. Years later, her son found documentation that he was the out-of-wedlock son of Lamarr and actor John Loder, whom she later married as her third husband. However, a later DNA test proved him not to be biologically related to either, as documented in Bombshell: The Hedy Lamarr Story.

== Awards, honors, and tributes ==
=== Public and audience recognitions ===
- Selected as the "most promising new actress" of 1938 in a poll of Philadelphia film fans conducted by Elsie Finn, the Philadelphia Record film critic (1939).
- Chosen as the "ideal type" of woman in a poll of both male and female students conducted by the Pomona College newspaper (1939).
- Named the "most beautiful actress" in "a secret poll of 30 Hollywood correspondents" conducted by the American magazine Look (1939).
- Won "top honors for facial features" in a poll of 400 members of the California Models Association (1940).
- Included by makeup expert Max Factor, Jr. among ten glamorous Hollywood actresses with the most appealing voices (1943).
- Voted the year's tenth best actress by British moviegoers for her performance in Samson and Delilah (1951).

=== Film and performing arts recognition ===
- Honored with a star on the Hollywood Walk of Fame for her contributions to the motion picture industry (1960).
- Voted 10th best actress by British moviegoers, for her performance in Samson and Delilah (1951).

=== Inventor and technology awards ===
- Jointly honored with George Antheil with the Electronic Frontier Foundation's Pioneer Award for their work on spread-spectrum technology (1997).
- Became the first woman to receive the Invention Convention's BULBIE Gnass Spirit of Achievement Award, described as the "Oscars of inventing," recognizing individuals whose creative lifetime achievements in the arts, sciences, business, or invention fields have significantly contributed to society (1997).
- Awarded the Viktor Kaplan Medal of the Austrian Association of Patent Holders and Inventors, in recognition of her inventive work (1998).
- Posthumously inducted into the National Inventors Hall of Fame for her role in the development of frequency-hopping spread spectrum technology (2014).

=== Places, memorials, and named institutions ===
- The Hedy-Lamarr-Weg was designated in Vienna Meidling (12th District), naming a street after her (2006).
- An honorary grave for Lamarr was created at the Vienna Central Cemetery in Group 33 G, Tomb No. 80, following the burial of her remaining ashes there, near the centrally located presidential tomb (2014).

=== Popular and corporate tributes ===
- Google commemorated the 101st anniversary of her birth with an animated Google Doodle, and marked her 109th birthday with a second doodle highlighting her film career and scientific work (2015; 2023).

=== Science and technology tributes ===
- The IQOQI installed a quantum telescope on the roof of the University of Vienna, which was named in her honor (2014).
- The asteroid 32730 Lamarr was named in her honor by the IAU Minor Planet Center (2019).
- One of the Global Positioning System satellites, GPS III-10, was named in her honor (2021).
- One of the radio frequency spectrum monitoring PHASMA satellites was named "LAMARR" in her honor (2025).

== In popular culture ==
=== Literature ===
- Mentioned in Herman Wouk's Pulitzer Prize-winning novel The Caine Mutiny, in which Lieutenant Barney Greenwald invokes Lamarr during a tense post-trial confrontation (1952). (Note: "You’ll retire old and full of fat fitness reports. You’ll publish your novel proving that the Navy stinks, and you’ll make a million dollars and marry Hedy Lamarr. No letter of reprimand for you, just royalties on your novel.")
- Featured as the central figure in Marie Benedict's biographical novel The Only Woman in the Room, a New York Times and USA Today bestseller and Barnes & Noble Book Club selection (2019).

=== Film and documentary ===
- Parodied through the villain Hedley Lamarr in the Mel Brooks western spoof Blazing Saddles, in which the character, played by Harvey Korman, is repeatedly mistaken for "Hedy Lamarr" and irritably responds, "That's Hedley" (1974).
- Her son Anthony Loder appears in the documentary film Calling Hedy Lamarr, which incorporates recordings of Lamarr's personal telephone conversations (2004).
- In the mockumentary The Chronoscope, written and directed by Andrew Legge, the fictional Irish scientist Charlotte Keppel is widely understood to be modeled on Lamarr; the film satirizes 1930s politics through a fascist group that steals Keppel's chronoscope, a device that can see the past and is used to create propaganda films (2009).
- The story of Lamarr's frequency-hopping invention and her later recognition as an inventor is the subject of the documentary Bombshell: The Hedy Lamarr Story, which premiered at the Tribeca Film Festival and was later broadcast on American Masters (2017).
- Lamarr was selected from a group of 150 information-technology figures to be profiled in a short promotional film commissioned by the British Computer Society, highlighting her role in the history of communications technology (2010).

=== Television ===
- Referenced in the I Love Lucy episode "The Dancing Star", in which Lucille Ball quips, "Gee, that means that you didn't see Clark Gable or Walter Pidgeon or Hedy Lamarr. They were all down by the pool" (1955).
- The story of her frequency-hopping spread spectrum invention is explored in an episode of the Science Channel series Dark Matters: Twisted But True, which examines the darker side of scientific discovery (2011).
- Her role in the development of wireless communication is highlighted in the premiere episode of the Discovery Channel series How We Invented the World (2013).
- Whitney Frost, a character in the second season of Agent Carter, was explicitly inspired in part by Lamarr and Lauren Bacall (2016).
- Celia Massingham portrayed Lamarr in the Legends of Tomorrow episode "Helen Hunt", set in 1937 Hollywoodland (2017).
- Alyssa Sutherland portrayed Lamarr in the Timeless episode "Hollywoodland", which depicts both her film career and wartime inventive work (2018). The episode aired March 25, 2018.
- Mentioned in the first episode of the animated series Marvel's What If...? (2021).
- Honored in the animated series Star Trek: Prodigy with the introduction of the Lamarr-class USS Voyager-A, a starship class named in tribute to her scientific legacy (revealed 2023; appears in season 2, 2024).

=== Theatre and performance ===
- The off-Broadway play Frequency Hopping, written and staged by Elyse Singer, dramatizes the collaboration between Lamarr and Antheil and received a prize from STAGE for best new play about science and technology (2008).
- HEDY! The Life and Inventions of Hedy Lamarr, a one-woman show created and performed by Heather Massie, presents her life story on stage (2016).
- Stand Still and Look Stupid: The Life Story of Hedy Lamarr, a one-actor play written by Mike Broemmel and starring Emily Ebertz, focuses on Lamarr's film career and inventive work (first staged 2016).
- The dance production Hedy Lamarr: An American Muse, created by Linze Rickles McRae and performed with her daughter Azalea McRae and students of the Downtown Dance Conservatory in Gadsden, Alabama, staged a choreographic tribute to Lamarr (2023).
- Anne Hathaway studied all of Lamarr's films and incorporated some of her breathing techniques into her portrayal of Catwoman in the 2012 film The Dark Knight Rises.

=== Music ===
- Referenced by the carnivorous plant Audrey II in the song "Feed Me" from the off-Broadway musical Little Shop of Horrors and its 1986 film adaptation, promising Seymour "a date with Hedy Lamarr" as one of the rewards for helping it (1982; 1986).
- In Dory Previn's song "Mary C. Brown and the Hollywood Sign", the eponymous starlet who finally achieved fame from jumping from the Hollywood sign was noted as looking "a bit like Hedy Lamarr".
- Johnny Depp composed the song "This Is a Song for Miss Hedy Lamarr" with Tommy Henriksen; the recording by Depp and Jeff Beck was released on their album 18 (2022).

=== Visual media, video games, and exhibitions ===
- In the video game Half-Life 2, Dr. Kleiner's pet headcrab, Lamarr, is named after Hedy Lamarr (2004).
- A photograph of Lamarr by Austrian-born American photographer Trude Fleischmann (circa 1930) was included in the New York Public Library exhibition Thirty Years of Photography at the New York Public Library (2010).
- Featured in the exhibition Lady Bluetooth at the Jewish Museum Vienna, which focused on her dual legacy as a Hollywood star and inventor (2019).

== List of works ==
=== Filmography ===
Source: Hedy Lamarr at the TCM Movie Database (archived)

Year	Title	Role	Notes
1930	Money on the Street	Young Girl	Original title: Geld auf der Straße
1931	Storm in a Water Glass	Secretary	Original title: Sturm im Wasserglas
1931	The Trunks of Mr. O.F.	Helene	Original title: Die Koffer des Herrn O.F.
1932	No Money Needed	Käthe Brandt	Original title: Man braucht kein Geld
1933	Ecstasy	Eva Hermann	Original title: Ekstase
1938	Algiers	Gaby	
1939	Lady of the Tropics	Manon deVargnes Carey	
1940	I Take This Woman	Georgi Gragore Decker	
1940	Boom Town	Karen Vanmeer	
1940	Comrade X	Golubka/ Theodore Yahupitz/ Lizvanetchka "Lizzie"	
1941	Come Live with Me	Johnny Jones	
1941	Ziegfeld Girl	Sandra Kolter	
1941	H. M. Pulham, Esq.	Marvin Myles Ransome	
1942	Tortilla Flat	Dolores Ramirez	
1942	Crossroads	Lucienne Talbot	
1942	White Cargo	Tondelayo	
1944	The Heavenly Body	Vicky Whitley	
1944	The Conspirators	Irene Von Mohr	
1944	Experiment Perilous	Allida Bederaux	
1945	Her Highness and the Bellboy	Princess Veronica	
1946	The Strange Woman	Jenny Hager	Also executive producer
1947	Dishonored Lady	Madeleine Damien	
1948	Let's Live a Little	Dr. J.O. Loring	
1949	Samson and Delilah	Delilah	Her first film in Technicolor
1950	A Lady Without Passport	Marianne Lorress	
1950	Copper Canyon	Lisa Roselle	
1951	My Favorite Spy	Lily Dalbray	
1954	Loves of Three Queens	Helen of Troy, Joséphine de Beauharnais, Genevieve of Brabant	Original title: L'amante di Paride
1957	The Story of Mankind	Joan of Arc	
1958	The Female Animal	Vanessa Windsor	

=== Radio appearances ===
Broadcast date	Series	Episode
July 7, 1941	Lux Radio Theatre	Algiers
December 29, 1941	Lux Radio Theatre	The Bride Came C.O.D.
May 14, 1942	Command Performance (radio series)	Edward G Robinson Hedy Lamarr Glenn Miller
October 5, 1942	Lux Radio Theatre	Love Crazy
August 2, 1943	The Screen Guild Theatre	Come Live with Me
September 26, 1942	The Chase and Sanborn Hour	Hedy Lamarr
October 26, 1943	Burns and Allen	Hedy Lamarr
January 24, 1944	Lux Radio Theatre	Casablanca
February 4, 1945	The Radio Hall of Fame	Experiment Perilous
November 19, 1951	Lux Radio Theatre	Samson and Delilah

== See also ==
- Inventors' Day
- List of Austrians
- Whitney Frost A character in the Marvel Cinematic Universe is loosely based on Ms Lamarr, her character having been both an actress and a physicist.
