= Upsurge =

Novel by J. M. Harcourt

- Title page for Upsurge (1934)
- Author: J. M. (John Mews) Harcourt
- Language: English
- Genre: Novel
- Publisher: John Long Ltd, London
- Publication date: March 1934
- Publication place: Australia
- Media type: Print (Hardback & Paperback)
- Pages: 287 pp
- ISBN: 0-85564-244-0 (facsimile edition)

Upsurge is a novel by Australian writer J. M. Harcourt. Set in Perth, Western Australia, during the Great Depression, it was the first novel to be banned by the then Commonwealth Book Censorship Board and the first to be prosecuted by police in Australia.

== Plot summary ==
The book tells the stories of Theodora Luddon, a 20-year-old receptionist, Peter Groom, a member of the bourgeoisie who claims unemployment benefits, city magistrate James Riddle, working-class man Colin Rumble who hangs himself after murdering his family, and Paul Kronen, the owner of a big drapery store. It is set in the 1930s, starts with Theodora fined two pounds by Riddle for indecent exposure at the beach and ends with Peter sentenced to a month in jail with hard labour after a riot in the city. "For a country in Depression, the writing about life in relief camps and corrupt officials was considered potentially incendiary."

== Banning ==
Three months after it was published, detectives removed copies of the novel from a Perth bookstore and asked that other copies be handed in to them. Sydney police also seized the book. In May 1934 police complained about the book to the Attorney-General's Department. All copies were removed from Perth bookstores and Harcourt left Perth following threats of prosecution. Federal authorities received complaints the novel was "Communist propaganda" and filled with obscene sexual content. The Trade and Customs Department released a report saying that the book was not without merit, but that it was grossly indecent. Upsurge was banned federally on 20 November 1934 on grounds of indecency.

Upsurge was the first Australian book to be officially banned under the guidelines of the Commonwealth Book Censorship Board (Norman Lindsay's Redheap had been banned under different legislation in 1930), which had been established in 1933 by Prime Minister Joseph Lyon's United Australia Party (later renamed the Literature Censorship Board). It was initially banned as seditious, later reviewed and the ban confirmed, ostensibly on grounds of indecency and explicit depictions of sex under the Indecent Publications Act, after the recently established Book Censorship Board had suggested the ban. However the main cause of its ban was its socialist tone and subversive agenda which criticised capitalism, featuring Communist characters in its portrayal of life in the relief camps of the Depression.

== Critical reaction ==
"The sort of stuff in Upsurge may have provided excitement of some sort to the author in the writing of it", The West Australian reported. "It may provide excitement for some of his readers - those who carry prohibited Parisian picture-cards in their pocket wallets and scribble on walls".

It was admired by Katharine Susannah Prichard (1883–1969, co-founder of the Communist Party of Australia, who said it was the first Australian novel to be written in the socialist realism style, and the first Australian proletarian novel. University of New South Wales academic Richard Nile later described Upsurge as "one of the most radical Australian books written during the interwar period".
