= Yordanis =

Yordanis, Yordanys or Yordenis is a masculine given name which is borne by:

- Yordanis or Yordany Álvarez (born 1985), Cuban retired footballer
- Yordanis Arencibia (born 1980), Cuban judoka
- Yordanis Borrero (born 1978), Cuban weightlifter
- Yordanis Cobos-Martinez (born 1988), Cuban-born American murderer
- Yordanis Despaigne (born 1980), Cuban boxer
- Yordanys Durañona (born 1988), Cuban-born Dominican triple jumper
- Yordanis García (born 1988), Cuban decathlete
- Yordenis Ugás (born 1986), Cuban boxer
