= List of films banned in Australia =

Symbol used to indicate refusal of classification by the Australian Classification Board

This is a list of films that have been or are banned in Australia.

== Rationale for banning ==
Films that are banned in Australia have been considered to be offensive against the standards of morality, decency and propriety generally accepted by "reasonable adults" to the extent that they should not be classified.

Films can be banned by the Australian Classification Board if they "depict, express or otherwise deal with matters of sex, drug misuse or addiction, crime, cruelty, violence or revolting or abhorrent phenomena in such a way that they offend against the standards of morality, decency and propriety generally accepted by reasonable adults to the extent that they should not be classified", "describe or depict in a way that is likely to cause offence to a reasonable adult, a person who is, or appears to be, a child under 18 (whether the person is engaged in sexual activity or not)", or "promote, incite or instruct in matters of crime or violence". Additionally, the RC classification is mandatory for any classifiable work that advocates the commission of a terrorist act under section 9A of the Classification (Publications, Films and Computer Games) Act 1995 (No. 7 (Cth)).

Films that are banned by the Australian Classification Board are labelled "Refused Classification" (RC), and the sale, distribution, public exhibition and/or importation of RC labelled films is a criminal offense punishable by a fine up to A$825,000 and/or up to 10 years imprisonment. Such penalties apply to individuals (and/or corporations) responsible for distributing or exhibiting such films to a wider audience.

With this in mind, it is legal to access films that have been labelled RC via the Internet, and personal ownership of these films labelled RC is legal except in Western Australia and prescribed areas of the Northern Territory, or if the films contain illegal content (i.e. child abuse material).

== Banned films ==
Year	Name	Reason for banning	History	Current status	Citation
1912	All films about bushranging, like The Tide of Death, for instance.	The Australian censors were concerned about the effects of such films on female audiences. The sympathetic telling of the bushrangers' stories were also deemed to hold the police up to ridicule.		All films are now unbanned.	
1928–1941 (chronological)	Dawn, Klondike Annie, Compulsory Hands, Applause, Cape Forlorn, All Quiet on the Western Front, Gang Bullets, and many more	Various	Creswell O'Reilly was hired as Chief Censor around this time, during which many films were banned.	All films are now unbanned, though their classification rating varies.	
1931	The Blonde Captive	Racial themes	A Columbia Pictures film deemed to be prejudicial to Aboriginal Australians by the Australian government. Claims made in the film that some Aboriginal Australians in the outback were actually neanderthals were also deemed by the Australian government to be harmful to ongoing anthropological research.	After its 1947 re-screening the film went missing. A full print of the film was later discovered and made commercially available on DVD in 2010.	
1964–1970	The Miracle, Viridiana, La Dolce Vita, Fellini Satyricon, The Silence, Blowup and Zabriskie Point	Various	Richard John Prowse is appointed Chief Censor and former Chief Censor C.J. Campbell (1957–1964) is appointed to the Appeals Board. During the 1960s, many films were banned.	Presumably unbanned at some point, as all films (except for The Silence, which is included on Ingmar Bergman's Faith Trilogy DVD, classified R18+) are now classified M.	
1969	Pretty Poison	Violence	Customs Minister Malcolm Scott saw this acclaimed thriller's excessive violence as a reason to ban the film version of Stephen Geller's novel She Let Him Continue. It had been cleared for release in neighbouring New Zealand; Senator Scott refused to ask the censor there if it had contributed to a "perceptible increase in crime or a decline in morals". Following the 1971 revisions to the local classification system, in 1972, the film was cut by one minute and forty-eight seconds "at the importer's request" in order to achieve an M rating.	Allowed uncut, classified M	
1971	Sweet Sweetback's Baadasssss Song	Violence	This Blaxploitation film from director Melvin Van Peebles was banned due to concerns regarding indecency and violence. It was reclassified as R18+ in 1980, a day before it was due to be shown at the Adelaide International Film Festival; however, then-South Australia Attorney-General Trevor Griffin banned it on the basis of an opening shot involving the director's son, Mario Van Peebles, which the government felt could be construed as a violation of the Child Pornography provision of the state's criminal law. The decision to ban the film from the festival was controversial in the state and led to the resignation of three of the festival's cabinet members. The decision also led to the end of stagings of the festival altogether until 2003.	The film was never resubmitted to the ACB, although it did air on SBS on 14 October 1992.	
1972	Pink Flamingos	Offensive content (exploitation, sexual violence, incest, adult themes, animal cruelty)	First banned in 1976. It was re-classified R 18+, with four minutes of footage removed. It was re-banned in 1981, and another three times in 1983. In 1984 it was given an X 18+ (banned in all states, although legally for sale in the two Territories), uncut. Soon after, attitudes towards sexual violence became stricter in the X 18+ category, and it would not be possible to earn the X 18+ again. It was re-banned in 1997, this version being the "25th Anniversary Edition" which added extra scenes. The distributor this time cut only two minutes to receive an R18+.	Allowed in a cut version, classified R18+	
1974	The Texas Chain Saw Massacre	Violence	The ban was lifted when the film passed uncut in 1984.	Allowed uncut, classified R18+	
1975	Vase de Noces (also known as Wedding Trough)	Obscenity and graphic depictions of bestiality and other content that is offensive and abhorrent.	Under pressure from the Western Australian government, the Australian Classification Board decided to ban this arthouse Belgian film for obscenity. The film was banned from being played at the Perth International Film Festival. However, the authorities lifted the ban temporarily and the film was allowed to be screened. In 1976, the government decided to re-ban the film. A third attempt to appeal the film's ban status was made in 1977, but the government rejected the film once again, and the film remains banned to this day. A successful attempt to allow the film is not likely to occur, given that the film violates Australian obscenity laws.	Still banned.	
1976	Salò, or the 120 Days of Sodom	Offensive content (exploitation, sexual violence)	Pasolini's Salò was banned at the time of release. This ban was then reversed in 1993; the film was re-classified R18+ for a theatrical release. However, the ACB re-banned it in 1998 for "offensive cruelty with high impact". It was then approved for DVD and Blu-ray (because its extra content gives it context) release in 2010, uncut. It can only be shown in cinemas if the extra material is screened with it.	Allowed uncut, albeit with requirement of supplementary materials for added context, classified R18+	
1977	In the Realm of the Senses	Sex and violence	Played uncut at Sydney and Melbourne Film Festivals in 1977, but was refused uncut for wide release. It was passed cut later that same year. The uncut version was banned again in 1981, and several VHS releases in the '80s were cut. It was finally passed uncut in October 2000 and released in August 2001 following the decision regarding Romance. In 2008, it was re-released by Umbrella, using the slightly censored UK DVD version, but has since been allowed uncut.	Allowed uncut, classified R18+	
1977	Last Cannibal World	Violence and indecency	Banned in April 1977 due to "indecency and indecent violence". A censored VHS tape to remove "indecent violence" was released in May, bearing nearly 10 minutes of cuts.	Allowed in a cut version, rated R18+	
1980	Caligula	Explicit scenes of sex and violence	In 1981 the ban was lifted, and a modified version with the rating R18+ was allowed. In 1984 the uncut version was released, and it received an X18+ rating. Later in 1984, the ACB decided to forbid films containing sexual violence and the film was re-banned. Ever since, the film's rating has fluctuated between RC (Refused Classification) and R18+ (depending on the version). In 2010, the ACB refused classification for the "Imperial Edition" DVD of Caligula; it was also refused in 2005. In 2021, the film was re-rated uncut classified R18+	Allowed uncut, classified R18+	
1980–2007	Faces of Death series	Violence; scenes of actual death	The first film was refused in December 1980, and the sequel was refused in 1983. The original was refused again in 1988 after the AFP confiscated it and handed it to the ACB. Umbrella Entertainment attempted to release a box set of the first four films in 2008, but only the first film was passed (uncut) with an R18+. The third and fourth films were refused classification for the first time in December 2007.	Only the original passed with an R18+; 2–4 remain banned.	
1981–2017	Cannibal Apocalypse	Frequent high impact gore	In November 1981, Palace Home Video released the film on VHS, with some major cuts to the film's more violent scenes. In 2017, Umbrella Entertainment released the film on DVD uncut.	Allowed uncut, allowed R18+	
1984	Cannibal Holocaust	Explicit gore/gruesome scenes	The ban was lifted in 2005 and the film was shown in public, in a cut version classified R18+. In 2006, the film was allowed uncut.	Allowed uncut, classified R18+	
1986	The Texas Chainsaw Massacre 2	Explicit violent content	There is a confirmation from 1992 of Customs forwarding an uncut print of The Texas Chainsaw Massacre 2 to the ACB, who later released it to the person for whom delivery of the film was meant. The Board did not give it a rating, so "at the time it was unclear what this meant for the film's banned status". In 2006, the film was officially unbanned.	Allowed uncut, classified R18+	
1987	The Last House on the Left (Krug and Company)	Sexual violence	Submitted for classification in 1987, it was banned. Several imported copies of the film were confiscated in the 1990s. In 2004, it was submitted for DVD release and was passed with an R18+ for "strong sexual violence, medium level violence".	Allowed uncut, classified R18+	
1989	Man Behind The Sun	Graphic depictions of war atrocities	Submitted to the classification board in 1989, it was refused classification (Banned). This is due to the graphic recreations of the Unit 731 experiments, real animal abuse, and a allegedly real autopsy scene. The film was resubmitted with four minutes cut on the 31st of March 1992, and received an R18+ for "GRAPHIC RE-ENACTMENT OF WAR ATROCITIES".	Allowed censored, classified R18+	
1990	Bad Taste	Excessive gore	The film was originally released with 88 seconds cut. In the state of Queensland, this cut version was banned after a three-week run in cinemas, resulting in the firing and dissolution of the Queensland Film Review Board. In 2005, the uncut version was released on DVD.	Allowed uncut, classified R18+	
1992	Nekromantik	Necrophilia	The film was originally seized by customs in late 1991, before being submitted to the OFLC for classification. In 1992, it was banned due to its depictions of necrophilia. In 2016, it was shown on SBS World Movies channel, as television screenings are not subject to the same classifications as films.	Still banned.	
1992	Nekromantik 2	Necrophilia	The film, just like its prequel, was banned by the OFLC in 1992 after first being confiscated by customs.	Still banned.	
1992	Buio Omega (also known as Beyond the Darkness)	High-level violence and necrophilic content	The film was seized by Customs in 1992, and forwarded to the ACB. It was subsequently refused classification.	In 2014, the ban was lifted and the following year it was released on DVD and Blu-ray for the first time by Umbrella Entertainment.	
1992	The Beast in Heat (also known as SS Hell Camp)	Excessive sexual violence	The film was seized by Customs in 1992, and forwarded to the ACB. It was subsequently refused classification.	Still banned.	
1992	Urotsukidoji: Legend of the Overfiend	Graphic depictions of sex and violence	Parts one and two of chapter four in this anime became the first animated features to be banned in Australia.	Allowed in a censored (by its British distributor) version, classified R18+	
1995	Twelve films screened at Tasmania's Queer Film Festival, including Spikes and Heels, Coming Out Under Fire, What a Lesbian Looks Like, Mad About the Boy, 21st Century Nuns and Sex Fish	Violation against the state of Tasmania's Criminal Code Act (1924)	Tasmania was (at the time) the only Australian state in which homosexuality (specifically "gay male sexual activity") was illegal. The festival has now moved to Melbourne.	Banned in Tasmania, still unrated by the Australian Classification Board. As the law in question was repealed in 1997, the films would be allowed in Tasmania and be given ratings by the ACB today (whether X18+ or not).	_{[citation needed]}
1997	Freeway (uncut version)	Explicit suggestions of sexual activity	When Columbia TriStar Home Video submitted a VHS of the original 104-minute print of the film to the ACB (then known as the Office of Film and Literature Classification), it was refused classification. The ACB had already approved a censored version, running 102 minutes, that removed two scenes: one in which Kiefer Sutherland asks Reese Witherspoon for anal sex on top of his excessive use of obscenities, and another in which a deceased 91-year-old grandmother is shown with a vase covering her private parts and her legs spread apart.	Allowed in a cut version, classified R18+	
1997	I Spit on Your Grave	Sexual violence	I Spit on Your Grave started in 1984 with an R18+ rating and passed a banning request in 1987, but was banned in 1997 due to "rising censorship of the late '90s". In 2004, the ACB decided to lift the ban.	Allowed uncut, classified R18+	
1999	Romance	Explicit depictions of actual sexual activity and sexual violence	Initially refused classification, the ACB overturned the ban on appeal in 2000, with the film becoming a watershed in allowing actual sexual activity in the R18+ classification.	Allowed uncut, classified R18+	
2002	Baise-moi	Explicit depiction of sexual violence (effect enhanced by actual sex)	The film was allowed at first, with an R18+ rating; in 2002, it was banned by the ACB. It was re-banned in 2013. On 23 August 2013, the film aired on the pay SBS World Movies channel in a cut form with an R18+ classification, due to the classification guidelines being different for television.	Still banned from theatrical showings or home media releases in Australia.	
2003	Ken Park	Sexual matters "in such a way that they offend against the standards of morality, decency and propriety generally accepted by reasonable adults"	Copies of the film were distributed via the Internet, and illegal public screenings were held in Sydney and other capital cities. "None were charged with offences in relation to this widely publicised illegal activity, presumably because that would have caused even greater public criticism of censorship laws."	Still banned; however, the film has not been widely distributed worldwide. The film was originally banned by the Office Of Film And Literature Classification on 21 May 2003 and the ban was upheld on 6 June 2003 by the Review Board, so it therefore remains banned in Australia to this day.	
2005	Wolf Creek	Ongoing murder trial of Bradley John Murdoch	The film was banned in the Northern Territory by Chief Justice Brian Ross Martin due to film's plot, which is based on the murder of British backpacker Peter Falconio by Bradley John Murdoch, to ensure Murdoch was entitled to a fair trial. Murdoch was found guilty, and the film is now presumably unbanned.	Presumably unbanned in the Northern Territory; never banned in any other state or territory.	
2010	A Serbian Film	High-level sexual violence and graphic violence	The ACB refused classification of the uncut version on 26 November 2010, and also to a 97-minute version. It was awarded an R18+ in a 96-minute (PAL running time) censored version, but on review in 2011, it was also refused classification, banning all public showings and DVD sales. On February 26, 2019, a USB drive containing the uncut version of the film was seized by the New South Wales Police Force and submitted to the ACB, effectively renewing the ban. However, the film remains legal to possess and view (in most parts of Australia).	Still banned (except for possession).	
2011	The Human Centipede II (Full Sequence)	"Offensive" depictions of violence and high impact cruelty	Originally passed with an R18+ rating; banned on appeal after release (screening in capital cities and at festivals, even into the week prior to its ban on review). On news of its banning, the applicant, Monster Pictures, announced its plans to submit a modified version for classification. On 14 December 2011, Monster Pictures announced a "slightly trimmed" version was passed with an R18+ classification.	Banned uncut; allowed with 30 seconds cut in December 2011	
2012	Father's Day	Sexually violent content	Allowed to screen on 24 March 2012 as part of the 6th Night of Horror Film Festival, it was refused classification when submitted for home video release in October 2012. A second version with 31 seconds cut was also refused; a version with 40 seconds cut was classified R18+ on 27 February 2013. Offending content included shots of forced anal and oral sex, as well as mutilation of a penis.	Allowed after 40 seconds cut, classified R18+	
2012	Found.	Prolonged and detailed depictions of sexualised violence	The Australian premiere for the film was held at Sydney's Dendy Newtown cinema on 16 April 2013. A DVD release was banned by the Classification Board in 2014 and then passed with an R18+ classification a few months later after two minutes of cuts were made by the distributor.	Allowed after two minutes cut, classified R18+	
2014	Children's Island	Child pornography concerns	The AFP seized a copy of the film and handed to the ACB, who subsequently refused classification on 27 February 2014, more than three decades after its release. Possession of this film in Western Australia and parts of the Northern Territory, would constitute a criminal offence.	Still banned	
2019	L'immoralità	Sexual content which depicts in a way that is likely to cause offence to a reasonable adult, a person who is, or appears to be, a child under 18.	Banned due to an application filed by NSW Police.	Still banned	
2021	Interspecies Reviewers: The Complete Series	Child pornography concerns	Originally rated MA15+ censored. The uncensored DVD release of the series, submitted by Madman Entertainment, was refused classification after the ACB found sex scenes in the third and ninth episodes that feature the halflings Kanchal and Piltia. The Board believed these scenes "depict a person who appears to be under the age of 18 years in a manner likely to cause offence to a reasonable adult."	Still banned	
2025	Videos featuring deaths of Charlie Kirk, Iryna Zarutska and Chandra Nagamallaiah	Graphic violence	The eSafety Commissioner ordered social media platforms to remove videos of extreme violence. Three of them were reviewed by the ACB and assessed as Refused Classification (RC).	Two were allowed uncut under R18+, one is still banned	

== See also ==
- List of banned films
- Cinema of Australia
- Film censorship
- Bushranger ban
