= J. M. Harcourt =

Australian novelist

- Born: John Mewton Harcourt; 2 March 1902; Melbourne, Victoria, Australia
- Died: 1971 (aged 68–69); New South Wales, Australia
- Writing career
- Notable work: Upsurge (1934)

John Mewton Harcourt (2 March 1902 – 1971), commonly known as J. M. Harcourt, was an Australian writer, known for his 1934 novel Upsurge, which was banned soon after publication.

== Life ==
John Mewton Harcourt was born on 2 March 1902 in Melbourne, Victoria, (Note: One source says he was born in Katanning, WA.) and grew up in Western Australia. He ran away from boarding school when he was quite young, and spent much of his youth working as a sundowner (itinerant labourer) and jackaroo. He spent time in Victoria and New South Wales, before heading back west to Kalgoorlie to join his father. There he worked as an assistant surveyor, and later worked in the pearling industry in Broome, eventually becoming captain of a pearling lugger.

Educating himself at the State Library of Western Australia in Perth, Harcourt moved into journalism by sending articles to newspapers. He wrote about the Depression in Western Australia. He published his first novel, Pearlers, in 1933. Leaving Perth in 1934 to move to Melbourne after being offered a at Truth, he joined the Communist Party of Australia.

He published his second novel, Upsurge, in 1934, which became the first Australian book to be officially banned under the guidelines of the Commonwealth Book Censorship Board (Norman Lindsay's Redheap had been banned under different legislation in 1930), which had been established in 1933 by Prime Minister Joseph Lyon's United Australia Party (later renamed the Literature Censorship Board). It was initially banned as seditious, later reviewed and the ban confirmed, ostensibly on grounds of indecency and explicit depictions of sex under the Indecent Publications Act, after the recently established Book Censorship Board had suggested the ban. It was the first Australian novel to employ the socialist realist style, the manner promoted by the Soviet Union at that time. However the main cause of its ban was its socialist tone and subversive agenda which criticised capitalism, featuring Communist characters in its portrayal of life in the relief camps of the Depression.

He published It Never Fails : Being a Narrative of the Adventures of Julius Windowen Among the Natives of the Antipodes in 1937.

Harcourt died in New South Wales in 1971.

== Selected works ==
=== Novels ===
- The Pearlers 1933
- Upsurge 1934
- It Never Fails 1937
