= Bombshell: The Hedy Lamarr Story =

- Theatrical poster
- Directed by: Alexandra Dean
- Written by: Alexandra Dean
- Produced by: Adam Haggiag; Katherine Drew; Alexandra Dean
- Cinematography: Buddy Squires
- Edited by: Lindy Jankura; Penelope Falk; Alexandra Dean
- Music by: Keegan DeWitt; Jeremy Bullock
- Production company: Reframed Pictures
- Distributed by: Zeitgeist Films; Kino Lorber
- Release dates: April 23, 2017 (Tribeca Film Festival); November 24, 2017
- Running time: 90 minutes
- Country: United States
- Language: English
- Budget: $1.5 million
- Box office: $1.2 million

Bombshell: The Hedy Lamarr Story (referred to onscreen as simply Bombshell) is a 2017 American biographical documentary film directed, written and co-edited by Alexandra Dean, about the life of actress and inventor Hedy Lamarr. It had its world premiere at the 2017 Tribeca Film Festival and released theatrically on November 24, 2017. The film was broadcast in the United States on the PBS biography series American Masters in May 2018. As of April 2020, it was also available on Netflix.

== Synopsis ==
The film follows the life story of Lamarr from her youth as the daughter of assimilated Austrian Jews through her rise to fame, the Nazi onslaught, her departure for the United States, six marriages, her acting career, her landmark invention, decline, and finally her death at the age of 85 in the year 2000. The focus of the film is on her co-creation with George Antheil of the technology of frequency hopping.

The film delves into Lamarr's different, seemingly unhealthy relationships with Louis B. Mayer (the head of Metro-Goldwyn-Mayer Studios), Max Jacobson (Dr. Feelgood), and director Cecil B. DeMille. The film also shows how Lamarr became so reclusive at the end of her life.

== Release ==
Distribution rights to the film were acquired by Zeitgeist Films and Kino Lorber in August 2017.

== Reception ==
=== Critical reception ===
On review aggregator website Rotten Tomatoes, the film holds an approval rating of 96%, based on 81 reviews, with an average rating of 7.5/10. The website's critical consensus reads, "Inspiring and tragic, Bombshell is a bittersweet celebration and reclamation of Hedy Lamarr's journey from Hollywood legend to technology genius." Metacritic gave the film a score of 70 out of 100 based on 20 critical reviews, indicating "generally favorable" reviews.

Manohla Dargis, writing in The New York Times, said of the film, "'Bombshell' is a very enjoyable addition to what has become a minor Hedy Lamarr industry that includes documentaries, books and stage productions.... Ms. Dean relates Lamarr's ventures, those onscreen and off, with savvy and narrative snap, fluidly marshaling a mix of original interviews and archival material that includes film clips, home movies and other footage." She later listed it among her favorite films of the year.

The Hollywood Reporter stated, "First-time director Dean does an excellent job of marshalling old source material, setting the scene for an account of Lamarr's life on- and off-screen." Kenneth Turan, writing in the Los Angeles Times, called the film "timely" and noted, "what makes 'Bombshell' intriguing is not just Lamarr's gift for invention, it's also what a fiery individualist she was, someone who had no regrets about her eventful life ("You learn from everything"), not even its racy, tabloid elements."

=== Awards and nominations ===
The film has won several awards since being shown at the Tribeca Film Festival, including a New York Times Critic's Pick and five audience awards. J. Hoberman named it "one of the ten best films of 2017".

In December 2017, the song "She" from the film by Alice Phoebe Lou was included on the Oscars shortlist for Best Original Song but it was not ultimately nominated.
