= Quantum telescope =

Concept telescope

A quantum telescope is a concept for a telescope aimed at overcoming the diffraction limit of traditional telescopes by exploiting some properties of quantum mechanics, such as entanglement and photon cloning.
