= National Inventors Council =

The National Inventors Council (NIC) was a United States government organization established in 1940 as part of the Department of Commerce's Office of Technical Service (OTC). It was designed to serve as a clearinghouse for inventions with possible military and national defense uses, and to bring these to the attention of the US Armed Forces.

Most active during World War II, the NIC continued into the mid-1950s. Its functions were transferred to the National Bureau of Standards when the Commerce Department abolished the OTC.

In 1973, the NIC was transferred from the National Bureau of Standards to the private sector, where it was overseen by the Academy of Applied Science and the Franklin Pierce Law Center.

As of at least 2009, its files are stored at the Washington National Records Center.
