= Laws governing public demonstrations in Australia =

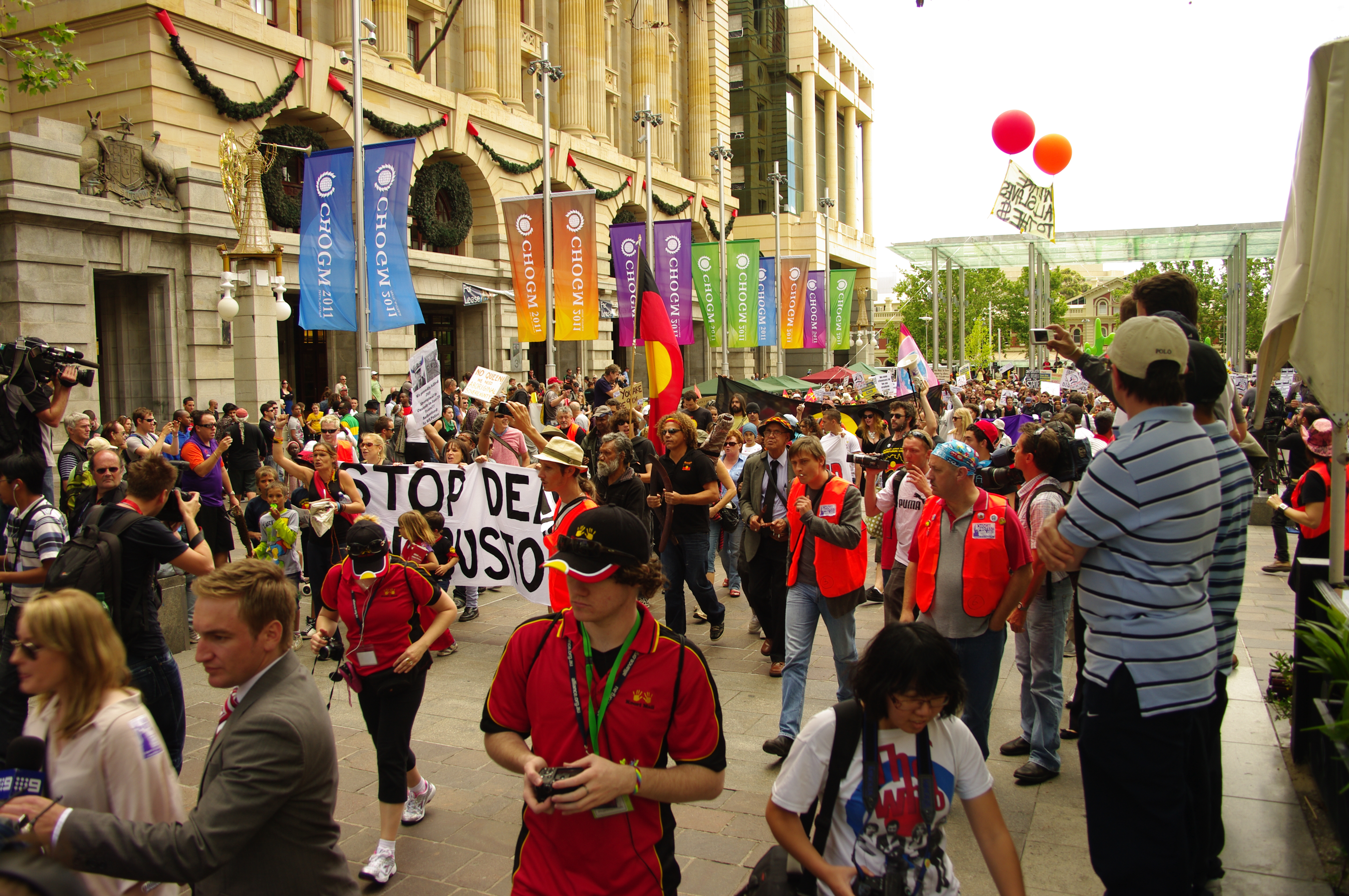
Commonwealth Heads of Government Protest 2011

There are a variety of anti-protest laws in Australia that exist, each having a different form and designated place in the law. Internationally, protest laws can exist at the state or federal level, according to the country they are created in. Both state and federal laws can be used in the act of protest under criminal codes. Specifically in the circumstances of trespass and public assembly law is used to counteract protests.

== Protest laws in Australia ==
In Australia, there is a judicial recognition of the right to peaceful assembly. At the federal level protests laws are constituted under the attorney-general of Australia's power. Within Australia, at the federal level there is a right to freedom of expression with the conditions that this does not; cause derogation, affect the reputation of others, cause harm to national security or incite violence.

At the state level laws are constituted by individual state governments and can vary largely. In Australia, there are various states that have a large amount of legislation surrounding protest laws. These states include the Australian Capital Territory, Queensland and Western Australia. In the states of Queensland and Western Australia mining is a large industry that is often met with protests and public demonstration. Therefore, within these states there is a larger amount of legislation relating to protests than in other areas of Australia. Additionally, as the Australian Capital Territory holds the capital of Australia, Canberra, protests are carefully regulated.

== Laws by jurisdiction ==
=== Federal ===
Protection of Persons and Property Act 1971

The Protection of Persons and Property Act 1971, states the application of the law in circumstances where public assembly or protest is conducted on protected land or against a protected person. The act details how certain occasions of public protest could cause occasion for arrest or legal action to be taken. Clause 8 of the act states;

Where there is an assembly consisting of not less than twelve persons in a Territory and:

(a) persons taking part in the assembly have conducted themselves in a way that has caused a member of a Police Force of the rank of Sergeant or above reasonably to apprehend that the assembly will be carried on in a manner involving unlawful physical violence to persons or unlawful damage to property;

(b) the assembly is being carried on in a manner involving such unlawful violence or damage; a member of a Police Force of the rank of Sergeant or above may give a direction under this section

Trespass on Territory Land Act 1932

Australian protest law is not necessarily direct, rather legislation surrounding the place protests may occur are evident. The Trespass on Territory Land Act 1932, dictates that if a person in any circumstance regardless of protest or not, is to be on territory land they will occur 5 penalty units from the state. This affects protests, as certain locations become inaccessible for demonstration.

=== Australian Capital Territory ===
In Australia's Capital Territory, protests are allowed dependent on the location the protest is being conducted. Different areas of the territory are graded according to whether or not they require permits from the National Capital Authority or the Territory government for protests to be held. These different permissions are required for protest within the Australian capital as parliamentary zones and diplomatic areas are located within the ACT.

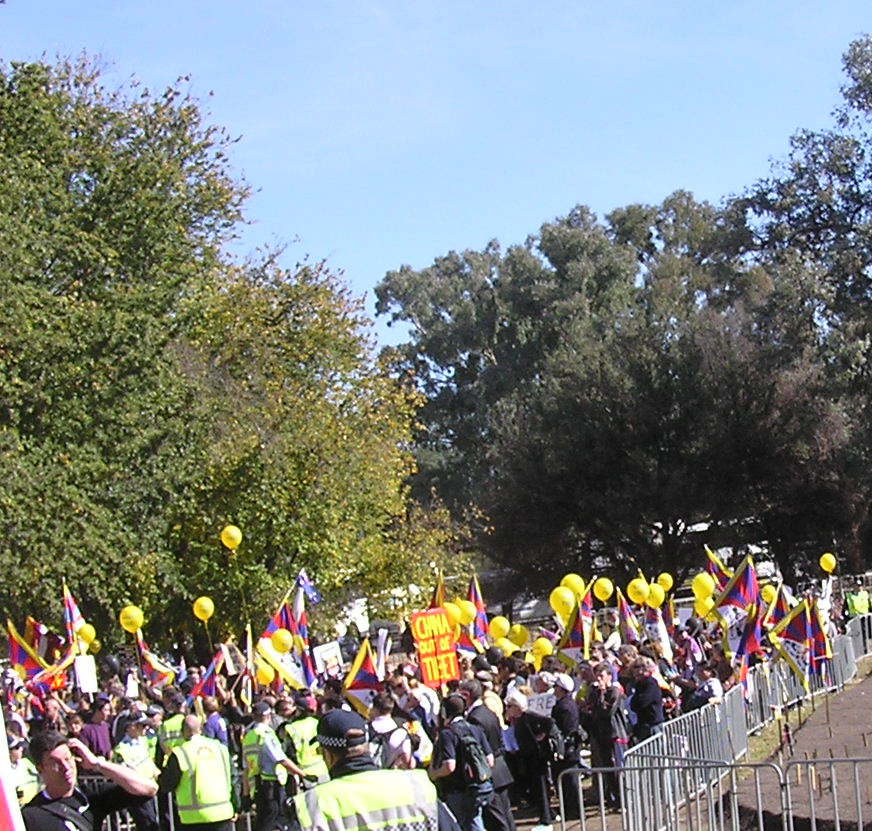
Free Tibet Protest - Canberra

For approval of protests by the National Capital Authority in parliamentary and diplomatic zones, a protest works plan must first be submitted. Furthermore, if a protest is to occur there are strict guidelines in place, to enhance public safety and facilitate fair access to public domains. Some of the guidelines include; participants should arrive and depart from the location in an orderly manner, vehicles must not be used within the parliamentary precincts as part of the protest and participants must observe lawful directions issued by parliamentary security, Australian Federal Police or Australian Protective Service officers. Failure to obey these guidelines will result in arrest.

=== New South Wales ===
In 2018, the New South Wales centre-right Coalition government passed anti-protest laws which came into effect on 1 July that year. The laws would give low-ranking government bureaucrats broad powers to ban protests. The laws were labelled a "fundamental attack on democracy" by a university law lecturer.

In 2019, there were calls to review "two decades of 'piecemeal' legislation restricting freedom to protest at both state [NSW] and federal level". The call came a week after protests and civil disobedience by Extinction Rebellion in Sydney, NSW, which resulted in many protestors being arrested. Many of the arrested protestors, including former Green Party federal MP Scott Ludlam, had "absurd" and possibly illegal bail conditions placed on them by the New South Wales Police which restricted the protesters freedom of assembly and freedom of association. However the NSW Coalition government said they had no plans to review protest laws.

The Chris Minns Labor government passed a law in early 2025 which restricted protests near places of worship. The NSW Council for Civil Liberties and legal scholars criticised this action as authoritarian and undermining freedom of assembly. Opposition legislators, such as Sue Higginson of the Greens, raised concerns over democratic backsliding. On 19 June 2025, a legal challenge was brought before the Supreme Court of New South Wales against the legislation.

The judge overseeing the case, Justice Anna Mitchelmore SC, ruled on 16 October 2025 that the law was unconstitutional, due to its impermissible burden on the Australian Constitution's implied freedom of political communication.

On 16 April 2026, the NSW Supreme Court struck down another anti-protest laws, passed on 24 December 2025 as a response to the Bondi mass-shooting. The laws were ruled to be unconstitutional, as they were found to impermissibly burden the implied freedom of political communication.

=== Queensland ===
Queensland follows the federal legislation Australia has created on protests and demonstrations whilst also having laws at the state level. Any public assembly or demonstration needs to give notice to the local police force five working days prior to the assembly being held. Opposition to the assembly will only occur if the demonstration will dispute the law. In Queensland the Peaceful Assembly Act allows the right for protests to be held and will only be restricted if public safety, public order or the protection of rights and freedoms is infringed.

In November 2019, the centre-left Queensland Labor government passed harsh anti-protest laws targeting environmental / climate-change activists who protested the construction of new coal mines in the state. United Nations human rights experts called the laws "inherently disproportionate". The Queensland government attempted to justify the laws by falsely claiming that protesters had "booby-trapped" locking devices used to secure them to objects/roads for protest.

=== Tasmania ===
In 2016, the Tasmanian centre-right Coalition government attempted to pass a harsh anti-protest law, making it a crime to protest in forests which were going to be logged, among other places. The law was ruled unconstitutional by the High Court of Australia after a challenge was brought by former Green Party leader and environmental activist Bob Brown. The High Court ruled the laws unconstitutional because the breached the right to political communication, which is implicit in the Australian Constitution.

In 2019, the Coalition state government attempted to pass similar laws, again.

=== Western Australia ===
Within Western Australia there is distinct legislation that prohibits certain types of protests from occurring. These prohibitions are highlighted within the Criminal Code Amendment (Prevention of Lawful Activity) Bill. The act illustrates that a protest can be considered illegal or have its members involved arrested in the circumstances of trespass and intent to cause harm.
