= Ecstasy and Me =

1966 alleged autobiography of Hedy Lamarr

Ecstasy and Me: My Life as a Woman
- Actress and inventor Hedy Lamarr
- Author: Hedy Lamarr (Leo Guild and Cy Rice)
- Language: English
- Genre: Autobiography
- Publisher: Bartholomew House
- Publication date: 1966
- Publication place: United States
- Pages: 318
- OCLC: 412157

Ecstasy and Me: My Life as a Woman is the alleged tell-all style autobiography of Austrian-born actress and inventor Hedy Lamarr, ghostwritten by Leo Guild and Cy Rice and first published in 1966. The book spent four weeks at #1 on The New York Times Best Seller list in 1966.

In 1966 Lamarr's lawsuit to overturn the book was refused by a Los Angeles judge. When the book was published, she filed for $21 million in damages. Lamarr condemned the book's contents as "fictional, false, vulgar, scandalous, libelous and obscene". During a 1969 appearance on The Merv Griffin Show, she responded to a comment from host Merv Griffin regarding Ecstasy and Me by stating "Don't talk about that, that's not my book" and mentioned writing a book of her own called Hedy.

In a 1970 interview with The New York Times, Lamarr noted that her material was "misused and distorted" and that she did not receive any funds from the book.

When the book was published, it was reviewed in The New Republic by Larry L. King, where King noted "If there is a sexual experience Miss Lamarr has not partaken of, it belongs in the future tense".
