= Killing of Chandra Nagamallaiah =

2025 murder in Dallas, Texas, US

- Location: Dallas, Texas, US
- Date: September 10, 2025; 8:26 a.m. (CDT) – 8:30 a.m.
- Attack type: Stabbing and beheading
- Weapon: Machete
- Victim: Chandra Mouli Nagamallaiah
- Perpetrator: Yordanis Cobos-Martinez
- Charges: Capital murder

Chandra Mouli "Bob" Nagamallaiah (December 2, 1974 – September 10, 2025) was an Indian motel manager living in the United States who was stabbed and then beheaded in front of his wife and son by his Cuban co-worker Yordanis Cobos-Martinez, after an argument at the Downtown Suites Dallas motel that they worked at in the Owenwood neighborhood of Dallas, Texas in September 2025.

== Background ==
Chandra Mouli Nagamallaiah was born on December 2, 1974 and raised in Bangalore, Karnataka, India. He married a woman named Nisha, and they had a son named Gaurav around 2007. He began in business with a small retail store selling baby and children’s supplies, then later ran two restaurants in India before moving his family to the United States in 2020. In 2021, Nagamallaiah moved, with his family, to Dallas, Texas from San Antonio, Texas to work at the Downtown Suites Dallas motel where he was later killed. Nagamallaiah's family and friends called him Bob.

Yordanis Cobos-Martinez was born on March 20, 1988, in Cuba. At some point he illegally migrated to the United States, eventually settling in Texas. He also worked at the Downtown Suites Dallas motel.

Cobos-Martinez had a criminal record in California, Texas and Florida, having been charged in February 2017 for stealing a Mercedes-Benz in Miami-Dade County, Florida, and in June 2017 for carjacking a woman while naked in South Lake Tahoe, California. The next year in 2018, he fled California to Texas where he was charged with aggravated assault, a felony, in Harris County that same year. He ended up pleading guilty to a misdemeanor assault charge and was sentenced to 1 year in county jail. While he resided in Texas, Cobos-Martinez was also charged with an act of indecency in Houston before moving back to Florida where he was charged with assault on a child. In January 2023, he was back in Texas where the Harris County Sheriff's Office arrested Cobos-Martinez on an out-of-state fugitive warrant. According to court records, he was in custody when authorities realized he was wanted out of California for a series of charges: carjacking, false imprisonment and failure to appear. He was eventually extradited to California to face the charges. In later 2023, Cobos-Martinez was convicted by jury trial in California of the carjacking and was sentenced to a year and a half. He was ultimately released on January 13, 2025, with deportation back to Cuba attempted; however, he was denied entry into Cuba due to his criminal history, so he was then put under supervision. only to abscond again and make his way back to Texas.

== Murder ==
On September 10, 2025, shortly after 8:00 a.m. CDT, at the Downtown Suites Dallas motel, 50-year-old motel manager Chandra Mouli Nagamallaiah and two of his co-workers, an anonymous woman and 37-year-old Yordanis Cobos-Martinez, were cleaning rooms on the bottom floor of the motel. Nagamallaiah informed the other employee and Cobos-Martinez not to use the washing machine because it was broken. Cobos-Martinez grew angry when Nagamallaiah asked the female co-worker to translate the instructions due to language barriers, instead of Nagamallaiah speaking to him directly. The two men then began to argue, and Cobos-Martinez left the room.

At around 8:20 a.m., Cobos-Martinez returned with a machete and began to stab Nagamallaiah, who attempted to run to the motel's front office. Nagamallaiah's wife Nisha and his son Gaurav ran out of the front office and tried to pull Cobos-Martinez away, but he pushed them off and started hacking at Nagamallaiah's neck, eventually beheading him.

At exactly 8:30 a.m., Cobos-Martinez kicked Nagamallaiah's head into the parking lot, picked it up, and took it to a dumpster. As paramedics arrived at 8:31 a.m., he tossed the head inside the dumpster. Minutes later, police arrested Cobos-Martinez, who was covered in blood and carrying the machete.

== Aftermath ==
Yordanis Cobos-Martinez was charged with capital murder, after admitting to killing Nagamallaiah. Chandra Nagamallaiah's funeral was held on September 13, 2025. President Donald Trump noted that Chandra Nagamallaiah was a "well respected person in Dallas, Texas" and stated that Cobos-Martinez "will be prosecuted to the fullest extent". He criticised the Biden administration for their failure at handling Cobos-Martinez.
