= Joseph F. Lyon =

American politician

Joseph F. Lyon (April 23, 1825, in Susquehanna County, Pennsylvania – 1902 in Elkhorn, Wisconsin) was a member of the Wisconsin State Assembly.

== Biography ==
Lyon was born on April 23, 1825, in Susquehanna County, Pennsylvania. On July 26, 1854, he married Arimathea Jones. They had three children before her death on November 7, 1872. Later, Lyon married Amelia Dodge on December 10, 1873.

== Career ==
Lyon was a member of the Assembly in 1868. Other positions he held include justice of the peace.
