= 1975 Australian constitutional crisis =

Dismissal of Prime Minister Gough Whitlam

- Date: 16 October 1975 (deferral of supply); 11 November 1975 (dismissal of Gough Whitlam)
- Location: Canberra, Australian Capital Territory: Government House; Provisional Parliament House; The Lodge
- Participants: Sir John Kerr; Gough Whitlam; Malcolm Fraser
- Outcome: Whitlam dismissed as prime minister by Kerr; Fraser commissioned as prime minister; 1975 Australian federal election

The 1975 Australian constitutional crisis, also called the Dismissal, culminated with the dismissal of the prime minister, Gough Whitlam of the Australian Labor Party (ALP), by Sir John Kerr, the governor-general of Australia, on 11 November 1975. Kerr then commissioned the leader of the opposition, Malcolm Fraser of the Liberal Party, as prime minister on the condition that he advise a new election. It has been described as the greatest political and constitutional crisis in Australian history.

The Labor Party under Whitlam came to power in the 1972 federal election, ending 23 consecutive years of Liberal–Country Coalition government. Labor won a majority in the House of Representatives of 67 seats to the Coalition's 58 seats, but faced a hostile Senate. In May 1974, after the Senate voted to reject six of Labor's bills, Whitlam advised governor-general Sir Paul Hasluck to call a double dissolution election. The election saw Labor re-elected, with its House of Representatives majority reduced from nine to five seats, although it gained seats in the Senate. With the two houses of Parliament still deadlocked, pursuant to section 57 of the Australian Constitution, Whitlam was able to narrowly secure passage of the six trigger bills of the earlier double dissolution election in a joint sitting of Parliament on 6–7 August 1974, the only such sitting held in Australia's history.

Whitlam's tenure in office proved highly turbulent and controversial, and in October 1975, the Opposition under Fraser used its control of the Senate to defer passage of appropriation bills needed to finance government expenditure which had already been passed by the House of Representatives. Fraser and the Opposition stated that they would continue to block supply in the Senate unless Whitlam called a fresh election for the House of Representatives, and urged Kerr, who had been appointed governor-general on Whitlam's advice in July 1974, to dismiss Whitlam unless he acceded to their demand. Whitlam believed that Kerr would not dismiss him as prime minister, and Kerr did nothing to make Whitlam believe that he might be dismissed.

On 11 November 1975, the crisis came to a head as Whitlam went to seek Kerr's approval to call a half-Senate election in an attempt to break the parliamentary deadlock. Kerr did not accept Whitlam's request, and instead dismissed him as prime minister and appointed Fraser as caretaker prime minister on the understanding that he would immediately call a general election. Acting quickly before all ALP parliamentarians became aware of the change of government, Fraser and his parliamentary allies were able to secure passage of the supply bills through the Senate and advised Kerr to dissolve Parliament for a double dissolution election. Fraser and his Liberal–Country Coalition were elected with a massive majority in the federal election held the following month.

The events of the Dismissal led to only minor constitutional change. The Senate retained its power to block supply, and the governor-general the power to dismiss government ministers; however, these powers have not since been used to force a government from office. Allegations of CIA involvement in Whitlam's dismissal have been made, but these were denied by both Kerr and Whitlam. Kerr was widely criticised by Labor supporters for his actions, resigned early as governor-general, and lived much of his remaining life abroad.

== Background ==
=== Constitutional background ===
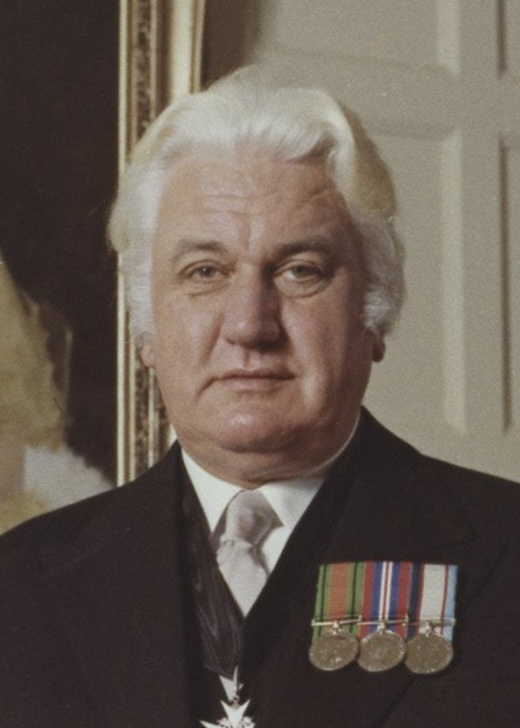
Governor-General Sir John Kerr

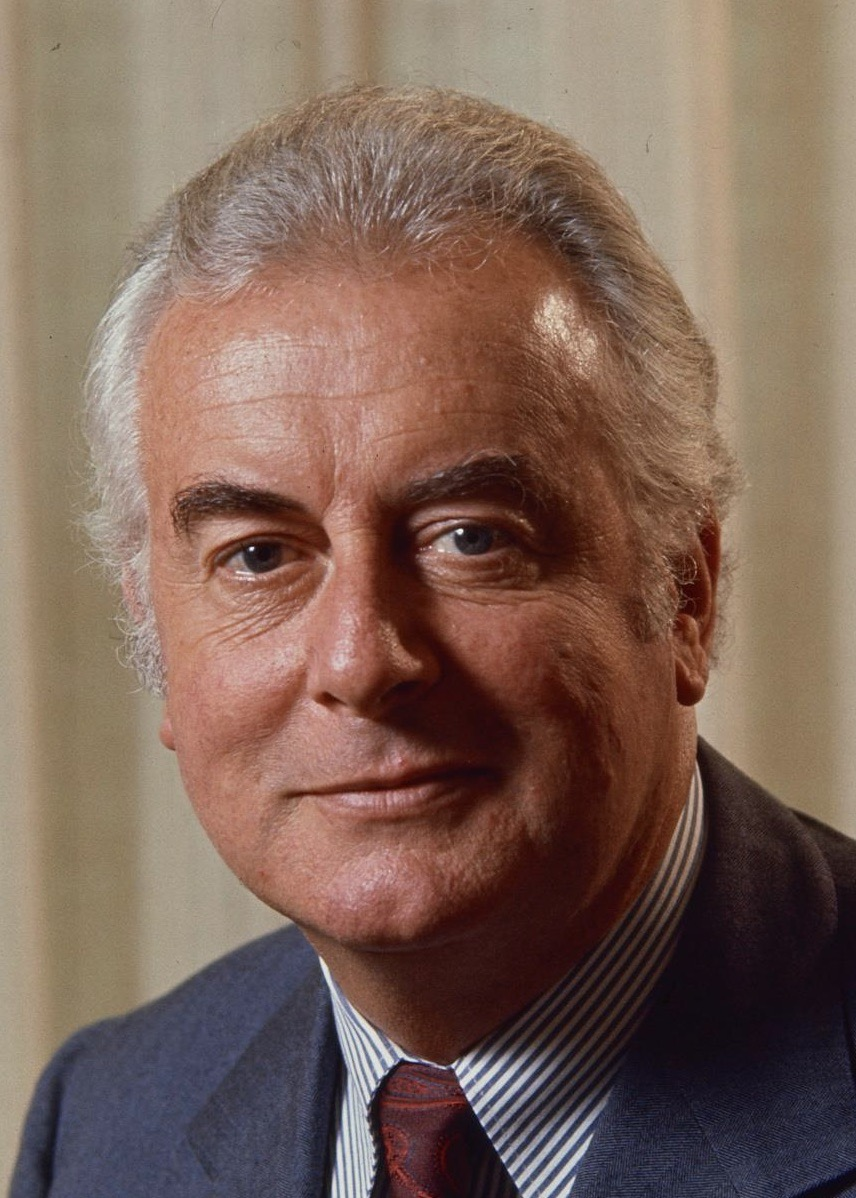
Prime Minister Gough Whitlam

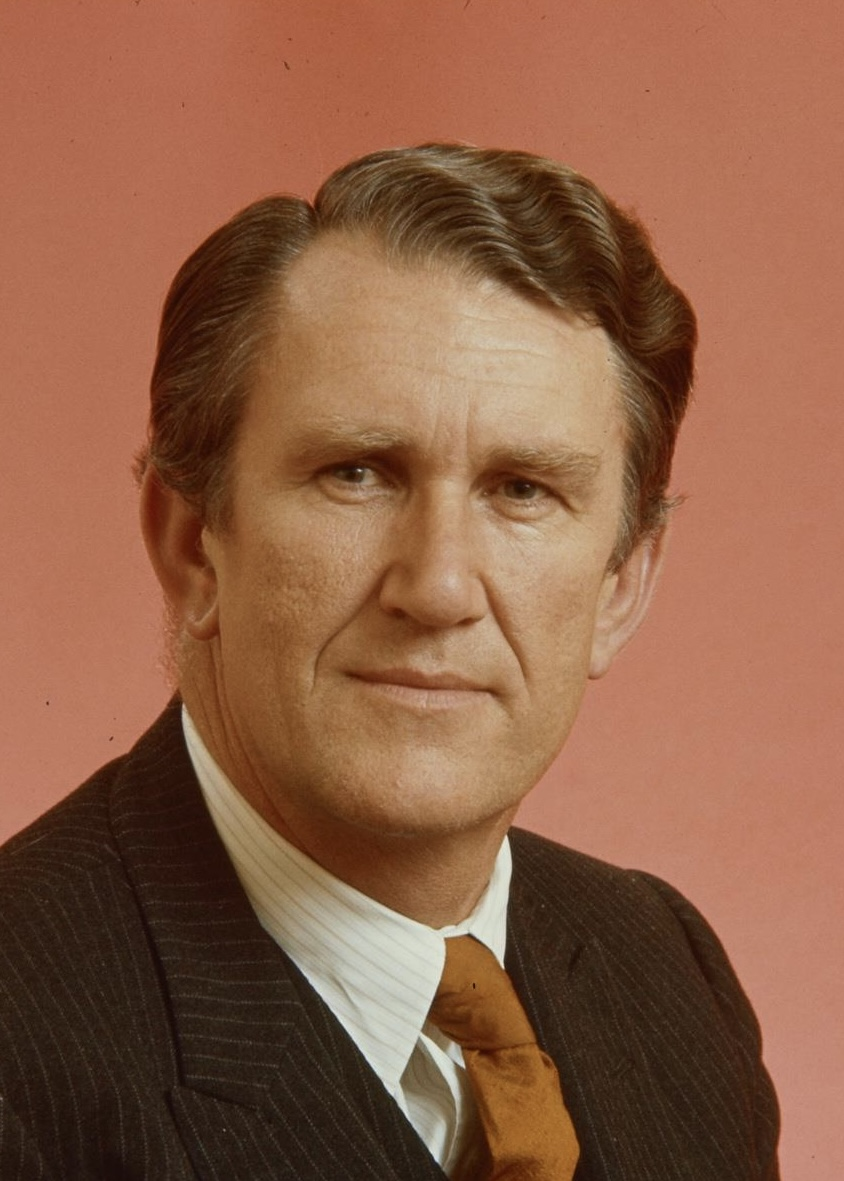
Opposition Leader Malcolm Fraser

As established by the Constitution of Australia, the Parliament of Australia is composed of two houses, the House of Representatives and the Senate, together with the monarch. The monarch is represented through the governor-general, whom the monarch appoints (and therefore may remove) on the advice of the prime minister. Formally, the governor-general may exercise all of the Commonwealth's executive power; however, in practice they are generally bound by convention to act only upon the advice of the prime minister and the government. The limited number of powers that may be exercised without advice and according to the governor-general's own discretion are known as the reserve powers. These powers are also governed by convention. For example, the appointment and dismissal of a prime minister is a reserve power, but convention dictates that ordinarily only somebody who has the confidence of the House of Representatives may be appointed.

As in most Westminster system parliaments, Australia's government is ordinarily formed by the party enjoying the confidence of the lower house of parliament, the House of Representatives. Australia's Parliament also has a powerful upper house, the Senate, which must pass any bill initiated by the House of Representatives if it is to become law. The composition of the Senate, in which each state has an equal number of senators regardless of that state's population, was originally designed to attract the Australian colonies into one Federation. Some at the time of Federation saw the contradiction in the Constitution between responsible government, in which the executive owes its existence to the legislature or one dominant house of the legislature, and, federations with the houses of bicameral legislatures operating independently and possibly deadlocking. Certain delegates predicted that either responsible government would result in the federation becoming a unitary state or federalism would result in an executive closer to federal theory. For instance, delegate Winthrop Hackett stated at the 1891 Convention that as a result of the combination of a strong Senate with responsible government, "there will be one of two alternatives—either responsible government will kill federation, or federation in the form in which we shall, I hope, be prepared to accept it, will kill responsible government".

Constitutionally, the Senate is unable to originate or amend a money bill coming from the House, although it may return the bill to the House with requests for amendment; or, as with any other bill, it may reject the bill entirely. Whether there was nevertheless a convention that the upper house should not reject money bills from the lower house was a key issue in the dispute. During and after the crisis, Whitlam argued for the existence of this convention; however previously as Leader of the Opposition he had supported the blocking of supply, stating of a budget bill: "Let me make it clear at the outset that our opposition to this Budget is no mere formality. We intend to press our opposition by all available means on all related measures in both Houses. If the motion is defeated, we will vote against the Bills here and in the Senate. Our purpose is to destroy this Budget and destroy the Government which has sponsored it."

The Senate had never blocked supply before 1975, even when it had been controlled by the opposition. However, the Parliament of the state of Victoria had done so in 1947, in response to the federal Chifley government's attempt to nationalise the banks. The coalition-controlled upper house blocked the state budget in order to force a premature election. Labor premier John Cain called a snap election and was defeated.

Prior to the 1975 crisis, the governor-general's power to dismiss a prime minister against the incumbent's will under section 64 of the Constitution had never been exercised. Twice since Federation, conflicts between state premiers and state governors, who perform analogous functions to the prime minister and governor-general respectively at the state level, had resulted in the departure of one or the other. In 1916, New South Wales premier William Holman was expelled from the Australian Labor Party for supporting conscription. He managed to hold on to power with the aid of opposition parties and consulted the governor, Sir Gerald Strickland, proposing to pass legislation to extend the term of the lower house of the state legislature by a year. When Strickland objected, stating that such a course was unfair to Labor, Holman had him replaced. In 1932 the New South Wales Labor premier, Jack Lang, refused to pay money owed to the federal government, which froze the state's bank accounts, causing Lang to order that payments to the state government be only in cash. The governor, Sir Philip Game, wrote to Lang to warn him that this was unlawful. Game further warned Lang that if Lang continued, he would have to sack Lang to obtain ministers who could carry on government within legal bounds. Lang replied that he would not resign, and Game dismissed his government and commissioned the leader of the opposition, Bertram Stevens, to form a caretaker government pending a new election, in which Labor was defeated.

Among the powers granted to the governor-general is the power to dissolve both houses of Parliament under section 57 of the Constitution in the event that the House of Representatives twice passes a bill at least three months apart and the Senate refuses to pass it. In both instances where those circumstances arose prior to the Whitlam government, in 1914 and 1951, the governor-general dissolved Parliament for a double dissolution election on the recommendation of the prime minister.

=== Political background ===
Gough Whitlam's Labor government was elected in 1972 after 23 years of rule by a coalition formed by the Liberal and Country parties. The ALP Government enjoyed a nine-seat majority in the House of Representatives, but did not control the Senate, which had been elected in 1967 and 1970 (as Senate elections were then out of synchronisation with House of Representatives elections). In accordance with pre-election promises, it instituted a large number of policy changes, and offered much legislation. The opposition, which still controlled the Senate, allowed some government bills to pass the Senate, and blocked others.

In April 1974, faced with attempts by the opposition under Billy Snedden to block supply (appropriation bills) in the Senate, Whitlam obtained the concurrence of the governor-general, Sir Paul Hasluck, to a double dissolution. Labor was returned at the election on 18 May with a reduced House majority of five seats. The Coalition and Labor each had 29 Senate seats, with the balance of power held by two independents. Snedden later told author Graham Freudenberg when being interviewed for the book A Certain Grandeur – Gough Whitlam in Politics: "The pressure [to block supply] was on me from [Doug] Anthony. We thought you had a chance of getting control of the Senate at the half-Senate election or at least enough to get a redistribution through. With a gerrymander, you'd be in forever."

Hasluck had been governor-general since 1969, and his expected term was shortly due to expire. Whitlam wanted him to remain a further two years, but Hasluck declined, citing the refusal of his wife, Alexandra, to remain at Yarralumla longer than the originally agreed five years. Whitlam offered the post to businessman Ken Myer, who turned it down. Whitlam then offered the position to his treasurer, Frank Crean, and his own deputy, Lance Barnard, neither of whom was keen to move on from parliament. Finally, Whitlam turned to his fifth choice, Sir John Kerr, the chief justice of New South Wales. Kerr was reluctant to give up the chief justiceship, in which he intended to remain another ten years, for the governor-general's post, which traditionally lasted five years. At Kerr's request, Whitlam informally agreed that if both men were still in office in five years, Kerr would remain governor-general for another five years. Whitlam also secured legislation to address Kerr's financial concerns about the position, including authorising a pension for the governor-general or his widow. The leader of the opposition, Billy Snedden, was enthusiastic about the appointment and also agreed to keep on Kerr in five years, were he prime minister at the time. Kerr then agreed to take the post, was duly appointed by Queen Elizabeth II, and was sworn in on 11 July 1974.

Six of the bills that had been the subject of the double dissolution were introduced in Parliament a third time and, as expected, were again rejected by the Senate. Section 57 of the Constitution provides that, after a double dissolution election, if bills that had been rejected twice by the Senate in the previous parliament were again passed by the House and again rejected by the Senate, they could then be put to a joint sitting of both houses. On 30 July, Whitlam gained Kerr's agreement for a joint sitting, which was set for 6–7 August 1974. The joint sitting, the only one in Australia's history under section 57, passed all six bills, including the enabling legislation for Medibank.

=== Controversy and vacancies ===
In December 1974, Whitlam was anxious to find new sources of money to finance his development plans. After a meeting at the prime minister's residence, The Lodge, Whitlam and three of his ministers (Deputy Prime Minister and Treasurer Jim Cairns, Attorney-General Lionel Murphy, and minister for minerals and energy Rex Connor) signed a letter of authority for Connor to borrow up to US$4 billion. This letter was described by author and journalist Alan Reid as the "death warrant of the Whitlam ALP government".

Connor and other ministers had made contact with a hitherto obscure Pakistani financier, Tirath Khemlani, as early as November 1974. Khemlani was said to have contacts in the newly enriched Arab oil nations. None of the efforts to secure a loan, whether through Khemlani or by other routes, bore fruit, but, as information about the "Loans Affair" trickled out, the government lost support.

In February 1975, Whitlam decided to appoint Murphy a justice of the High Court of Australia, even though Murphy's Senate seat would not be up for election if a half-Senate election were held. Under the Senate's electoral system, Labor could win three of the five New South Wales seats, but if Murphy's seat was also contested, it was most unlikely to win four out of six. Thus, appointing Murphy would almost certainly cost the ALP a Senate seat at the next half-Senate election. Whitlam appointed Murphy anyway. By convention, senators appointed by the state parliaments to fill casual vacancies were from the same political party as the former senator. The New South Wales premier, Tom Lewis, a member of the Liberal Party, argued that this convention only applied to vacancies caused by deaths or ill-health, and arranged for the legislature to elect Cleaver Bunton, former mayor of Albury and an independent.

By March 1975, many Liberal parliamentarians felt that Snedden was doing an inadequate job as leader of the opposition and that Whitlam was dominating him in the House of Representatives. Malcolm Fraser challenged Snedden for the leadership on 21 March, and defeated him by 37 votes to 27. At a press conference after winning the leadership, Fraser stated:

The question of supply—let me deal with it this way. I generally believe if a government is elected to power in the lower House and has the numbers and can maintain the numbers in the lower House, it is entitled to expect that it will govern for the three-year term unless quite extraordinary events intervene ... Having said that ... if we do make up our minds at some stage that the Government is so reprehensible that an Opposition must use whatever power is available to it, then I'd want to find a situation in which Mr Whitlam woke up one morning finding the decision had been made and finding that he had been caught with his pants well and truly down.

Whitlam's original deputy prime minister, Lance Barnard, had been challenged and defeated for his post by Cairns in June 1974 shortly after the May 1974 election. Whitlam then offered Barnard a diplomatic post; in early 1975 Barnard agreed to this. If the appointment went through, Barnard's resignation from the House of Representatives would trigger a by-election in his Tasmanian electorate of Bass. ALP officials felt that, given the party's weakened state, Barnard should remain in Parliament and be given no preferment if he resigned; party president and future prime minister Bob Hawke described the decision to appoint Barnard as "an act of lunacy". Barnard had been losing support over the last several elections, and the Liberals needed only a swing of four percent to take Bass off Labor. The Liberals had a candidate, Kevin Newman, who had been nursing the electorate; Labor had no candidate selected and a bitter preselection in the offing. Barnard resigned and was appointed the ambassador to Sweden. The election on 28 June proved a disaster for Labor, with Newman winning the seat on a swing of over 17%.

The next week, Whitlam fired Cairns for misleading Parliament regarding the Loans Affair amid innuendo about his relationship with his Principal Private Secretary, Junie Morosi. He was replaced as deputy by Frank Crean. At the time of Cairns' dismissal, one Senate seat was vacant, following the death on 30 June of Queensland ALP senator Bertie Milliner. The state Labor party nominated Mal Colston, who was the highest unelected candidate on the party's Queensland list in 1974. This resulted in deadlock in Brisbane; the unicameral Queensland Parliament twice voted against Colston, and the party refused to submit any alternative candidates. Queensland Country Party Premier Joh Bjelke-Petersen had evidence that Colston, a school teacher by trade, had set a school on fire during a labour dispute, though the police had refused to prosecute. After the Queensland Parliament voted Colston down a second time, Bjelke-Petersen instructed his majority in the Queensland Parliament to elect a low-level union official, Albert Field, who had contacted his office and expressed a willingness to serve. In interviews, Field made it clear he would not support Whitlam. Field was expelled from the ALP for standing against Colston, and Labor senators boycotted his swearing-in. Whitlam argued that because of the vacancies being filled as they were, the Senate was "corrupted" and "tainted", with the opposition enjoying a majority they did not win at the ballot box. When Labor learned that Field had not given the required three weeks notice to the Queensland Department of Education, it challenged his appointment in the High Court, arguing that he was still technically a public servant–and thus ineligible to serve in the Senate. With Field on leave throughout the remainder of the crisis, the Coalition refused to provide a pair to account for his absence, giving it an effective majority of 30–29 in the Senate. Whitlam remarked that if Milliner had not died or had he been replaced by a pro-Whitlam senator, the crisis would not have happened.

== Deadlock ==
=== Deferral of supply ===
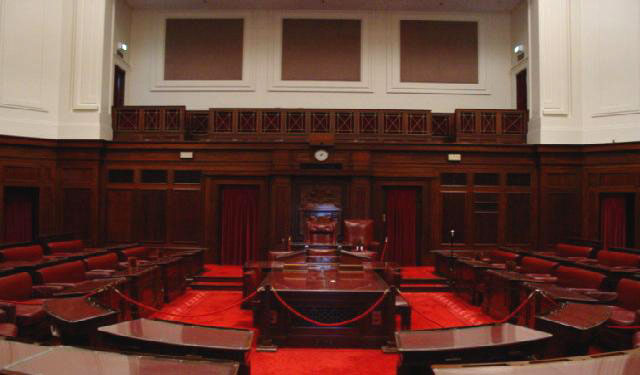
The Senate chamber at Old Parliament House

On 10 October, the High Court ruled that the act passed at the joint sitting that gave the Australian Capital Territory (ACT) and the Northern Territory two senators each was valid. A half-Senate election needed to be held by June 1976; most elected senators would take their seats on 1 July, but the territorial senators and those filling Field's and Bunton's seats would take their places at once. The ruling meant that it was possible for the ALP to gain a temporary majority in the Senate, at least until 1 July 1976. To do so, the ALP would have to win Field's and Bunton's seats, and one seat in each territory, and have the second ACT seat fall to either a Labor candidate or an independent, former Liberal prime minister John Gorton, now estranged from his party. If this happened, Labor would have an effective 33–31 margin, would be able to pass supply if that was still an issue, and also could pass electoral redistribution laws (which had been passed by the House, though twice defeated by the Senate) that would give it an advantage at the next election.

In the wake of the High Court ruling, and with the appropriation bills due to be considered by the Senate on 16 October, Fraser was undecided whether to block supply. His biographer, Philip Ayres, contends that, had there been no further government scandals, he would not have done so. Khemlani, however, had alleged – contrary to government statements – that Connor had never revoked his authority to obtain loans and had been in regular contact with him even into mid-1975. On 13 October, the Melbourne Herald printed documents in support of Khemlani's allegations, and on the following day, Connor resigned. Fraser, determined to block supply, convened a shadow cabinet meeting and received the unanimous support of the Coalition frontbench. At a press conference, Fraser cited the poor state of the economy and the continuing scandals as reasons for his decision. Without the passage of fresh appropriations, supply would be exhausted on 30 November.

On 15 October the governor of Queensland, Sir Colin Hannah, gave a speech denigrating the Whitlam government, in violation of the convention that state governors remain neutral. Hannah held a dormant commission as Administrator of the Commonwealth to act as governor-general in the event of Kerr's death, resignation, or absence from Australia. Whitlam immediately contacted Buckingham Palace to arrange for Hannah's dormant commission to be revoked, a process which took ten days to complete. Although Whitlam later alleged that he never contemplated dismissing Kerr during the crisis, on 16 October, while speaking with Kerr and Prime Minister Tun Abdul Razak, who was visiting he told Kerr that if the crisis continued, "It could be a question of whether I get to the Queen first for your recall, or whether you get in first with my dismissal." Kerr saw the statement as a threat; Whitlam later stated the comment was "flippant" and designed to turn the conversation to another subject.

On 16 and 17 October, the Senate, with the unanimous support of the Coalition majority, deferred the appropriation bills. In response to the blockage, Whitlam asserted that the Senate was acting against long-standing constitutional principles. On 16 October, the government endorsed a motion passed in the House stating that the Senate actions was "a gross violation" of conventions that placed the responsibility of the supply of money in the hands of the House of Representatives. The Opposition-controlled Senate rejected this contention, moving a motion that denied the existence of any such convention.

The Coalition took the position that Kerr could dismiss Whitlam if the Government could not secure supply. Whitlam's former solicitor-general Bob Ellicott, now a Liberal member of the House, issued a legal opinion on 16 October stating that the governor-general had the power to dismiss Whitlam, and should do so forthwith if Whitlam could not state how he would obtain supply. Ellicott indicated that Whitlam was treating Kerr as if he had no discretion but to follow prime ministerial advice, when in fact the governor-general could and should dismiss a ministry unable to secure supply. Ellicott stated that Kerr

should ask the Prime Minister if the Government is prepared to advise him to dissolve the House of Representatives and the Senate or the House of Representatives alone as a means of assuring that the disagreement between the two Houses is resolved. If the Prime Minister refuses to do either, it is then open to the Governor-General to dismiss his present Ministers and seek others who are prepared to give him the only proper advice open. This he should proceed to do.

Journalist and author Paul Kelly, who wrote two books on the crisis, argues that Whitlam was motivated by a desire to bring about de facto constitutional change, with the House of Representatives gaining dominance over the Senate:

Whitlam intended to use the crisis triggered by Fraser to defeat the Senate in such a comprehensive manner that no future Senate would contemplate such action, and to ensure that the contradiction within the Constitution since the inauguration of the Commonwealth was finally resolved with the victory of the Representatives over the Senate and of responsible government over federalism. Whitlam would become the last of the founding fathers. He would resolve the contradiction that they had been unable to resolve.

=== Consultations and negotiations ===
Kerr's major confidant and secret adviser regarding the dismissal was a member of the High Court and friend of Kerr, Sir Anthony Mason whose role was not revealed until 2012 when Whitlam's biographer Jenny Hocking detailed Kerr's archival record of their extensive consultations. Kerr described Mason as playing "a most significant part in my thinking" and wrote of confiding in Mason "to fortify myself for the action I was to take". Mason's role included drafting a letter of dismissal for Kerr and he also said he had advised Kerr that he should "as a matter of fairness" warn Whitlam of his intention to dismiss him, which Kerr refused to do. Mason writes that his discussions with Kerr began in August 1975 and concluded on the afternoon of 11 November 1975. He declined Kerr's requests to allow his role to be publicly known. Kerr rang Whitlam on Sunday 19 October, asking permission to consult with the chief justice of the High Court, Sir Garfield Barwick, concerning the crisis. Whitlam advised Kerr not to do so, noting that no governor-general had consulted with a chief justice under similar circumstances since 1914, when Australia was at a much earlier stage of her constitutional development. Whitlam also noted that in all of the recent unsuccessful High Court challenges to Whitlam government legislation, Barwick had been in the minority in finding against the government. On 21 October, Kerr phoned Whitlam regarding the Ellicott opinion, and asked, "It's all bullshit, isn't it?". Whitlam agreed with Kerr's view. Kerr then requested that the Government provide him with a written legal opinion rebutting Ellicott's views. Kerr would receive no written advice from the Government until 6 November. Paul Kelly paints this delay as a major mistake by Whitlam, given Kerr's judicial background. Kerr also asked on 21 October for Whitlam's permission to interview Fraser, which the prime minister readily granted, and the two men met that night. Fraser told Kerr that the Opposition were determined to block supply. Fraser indicated that the Opposition's decision to defer the appropriation bills, rather than defeating them, was a tactical decision, since then the bills would remain in the control of the Senate and could be passed at any time. He stated that the Coalition agreed with the Ellicott opinion, and proposed to continue deferring supply while it awaited events. The media were not told of the substance of the conversation, and instead reported that Kerr had reprimanded Fraser for blocking supply, causing the governor-general's office to issue a denial.

Throughout the crisis, Kerr did not tell Whitlam of his increasing concerns, nor did he suggest that he might dismiss Whitlam. He believed nothing he said would influence Whitlam, and feared that, if Whitlam perceived him as a possible opponent, the prime minister would procure his dismissal from the Queen. Accordingly, though Kerr dealt with Whitlam in an affable manner, he did not confide his thinking to the prime minister. Senator Tony Mulvihill later related that "Whitlam would come back to each caucus meeting and say, 'I saw His Excellency ... No worry. He's got to do it his way.' ... at no time did he hint that the Governor-General was frowning."

There was intense public interest and concern at the stalemate, and Fraser and his Liberals acted to shore up support. Liberal frontbenchers worked to build unity for the tactic in state organisations. The former longtime premier of South Australia Sir Thomas Playford was speaking out against the blocking of supply, causing South Australia senator Don Jessop to waver in his support for the tactic. Fraser was able to co-ordinate a wave of communications from party members which served to neutralise both men. Fraser sought the backing of the retired longtime Liberal prime minister, Sir Robert Menzies, and went to see Menzies in person, taking with him a 1947 statement by Menzies supporting the blocking of supply in the upper house of the Victorian Parliament. He did not have to use the paper; Menzies stated that he found the tactic distasteful, but in this case necessary. The former prime minister issued a statement in support of Fraser's tactics.

Kerr invited Whitlam and Minister for Labour Jim McClelland to lunch on 30 October, immediately preceding an Executive Council meeting. At that meal, Kerr proposed a possible compromise. If the Opposition were to allow supply to pass, Whitlam would not advise a half-Senate election until May or June 1976, and the Senate would not convene until 1 July, thus obviating the threat of a possible temporary Labor majority. Whitlam, who was determined to destroy both Fraser's leadership and the Senate's right to block supply, refused any compromise.

=== Decision ===
Fraser chaired a summit of leaders of the Coalition parties on 2 November. The resulting communiqué urged the Coalition senators to continue deferring supply. It also threatened, should Kerr grant Whitlam a half-Senate election, that the Coalition state premiers would advise their governors not to issue writs, thus blocking the election from taking place in the four states with non-Labor premiers. After the meeting, Fraser proposed a compromise: that the Opposition would concede supply if Whitlam agreed to hold a House of Representatives election at the same time as the half-Senate election. Whitlam rejected the idea.

On 22 October, Whitlam had asked the attorney-general, Kep Enderby, to have a paper drafted rebutting the Ellicott opinion for presentation to Kerr. Enderby delegated this task to the Solicitor-general, Maurice Byers, and other officials. On 6 November, Enderby was to see Kerr to give him a legal opinion regarding the Government's alternative plans in case supply ran out. Vouchers were to be issued to Commonwealth employees and contractors instead of cheques, to be redeemed from banks after the crisis ended—transactions which were to be rejected by major banks as "tainted with illegality". Enderby decided to present Kerr with the rebuttal to Ellicott. When Enderby reviewed the document, he found that, while it argued for the Government's position, it recognised both that the Senate had the constitutional right to block supply, and that the reserve powers were still extant—matters with which Enderby did not agree. He presented Kerr with the rebuttal, but crossed out Byers' signature on it and told Kerr of his disagreement. Enderby told Kerr that the Byers rebuttal was "background" for formal written advice, to be presented by Whitlam. Later that day, Kerr met with Fraser again. The Opposition leader told him that if Kerr did not dismiss Whitlam, the Opposition planned to criticise him in Parliament for failing to carry out his duty.

Kerr concluded on 6 November that neither Government nor Opposition would yield and had received advice that day from Treasurer Bill Hayden that supply would run out on 27 November. The governor-general decided that, as Whitlam could not secure supply, and would not resign or advise an election for the House of Representatives, he would have to sack him. As Kerr feared that Whitlam might advise the Queen to dismiss him, he considered it important that Whitlam be given no hint of the impending action. Kerr later stated that were Whitlam to seek his dismissal, it would involve the Queen in politics. Seeking confirmation of his decision, he contacted Chief Justice Barwick, met with him and asked for his views of a dismissal of Whitlam. Barwick furnished him with written advice containing his view that a governor-general could and should dismiss a prime minister who was unable to obtain supply. Barwick specified that the prime minister should also not have refused either to resign or to advise a general election, with which Kerr agreed.

On 9 November, Fraser contacted Whitlam and invited him to negotiations with the Coalition aimed at settling the dispute. Whitlam agreed, and a meeting was set for 9 am on Tuesday 11 November, at Parliament House. That Tuesday was also the deadline for an election to be called if it were to be held before Christmas. Both Government and Opposition leaders were in Melbourne on the night of 10 November for the Lord Mayor's banquet. To ensure the Opposition leaders could reach Canberra in time for the meeting, Whitlam brought them back in his VIP aircraft, which arrived in Canberra at midnight.

== Dismissal ==
=== Meeting at Yarralumla ===
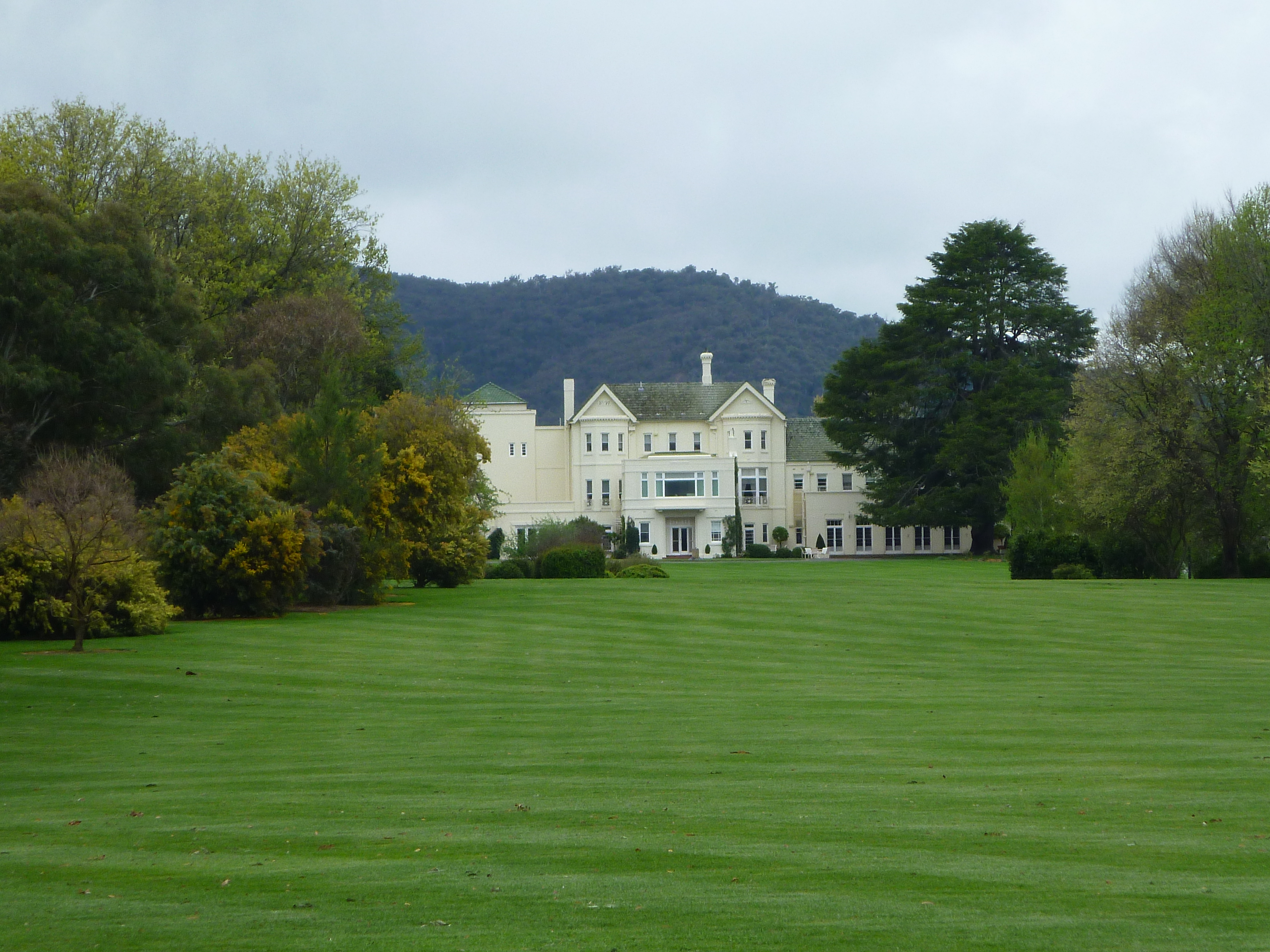
Government House, the official residence of the Governor-General at Yarralumla, Canberra

At 9 am on 11 November, Whitlam, together with Deputy Prime Minister Frank Crean and Leader of the House Fred Daly, met with Fraser and Country Party leader Doug Anthony. No compromise could be reached. Whitlam informed the Coalition leaders that he would be advising Kerr to hold a half-Senate election on 13 December, and he would not be seeking interim supply for the period before the election. Thinking it unlikely that Kerr would grant the election without supply, Fraser warned Whitlam that the governor-general might make up his own mind about the matter. Whitlam was dismissive and after the meeting broke, telephoned Kerr to tell him that he needed an appointment to advise him to hold a half-Senate election. Both men were busy in the morning, Kerr with Remembrance Day commemorations, and Whitlam with a caucus meeting and a censure motion in the House which the Opposition had submitted. The two discussed a meeting for 1:00 pm, though Kerr's office later called Whitlam's and confirmed the time as 12:45 pm. Word of this change did not reach Whitlam. Whitlam announced the request for a half-Senate election to his caucus, which approved it.

After hearing from Whitlam, Kerr called Fraser. According to Fraser, Kerr asked him whether he, if commissioned prime minister, could secure supply, would immediately thereafter advise a double-dissolution election, and would refrain from new policies and investigations of the Whitlam government pending the election. Fraser stated that he agreed. Kerr denied the exchange took place via telephone, though both men agree those questions were asked later in the day before Kerr commissioned Fraser as prime minister. According to Kerr, Fraser was supposed to come to Yarralumla at 1:00 pm.

Whitlam was delayed in leaving Parliament House, while Fraser left slightly early, with the result that Fraser arrived at Yarralumla first. He was taken into an anteroom, and his car was moved. Whitlam maintained that the purpose in moving Fraser's car was to ensure that Whitlam was not tipped off by seeing it, stating, "Had I known Mr. Fraser was already there, I would not have set foot in Yarralumla." Kelly doubted Whitlam would have recognised Fraser's car, which was an ordinary Ford LTD from the car pool. According to Fraser biographer Philip Ayres, "A white car pulled up at the front would signify nothing in particular—it would simply be in the way."

Whitlam arrived just before 1:00 pm and was taken to Kerr's office by an aide. He brought with him the formal letter advising a half-Senate election, and after the two men were seated, attempted to give it to Kerr. According to Kerr, he interrupted Whitlam and asked if, as a result of the failure to find a compromise between party leaders, he intended to govern without parliamentary supply, to which the prime minister answered, "Yes". In their accounts of their meeting, both men agree that Kerr then told Whitlam about the decision to withdraw his commission as prime minister under section 64 of the Constitution. (Note: Section 64 of the Constitution empowers the Governor-General to appoint ministers of state, who "shall hold office during the pleasure of the Governor-General".) Kerr later wrote that at this point Whitlam got to his feet, looked at the office's phones, and stated, "I must get in touch with the Palace at once." According to Kerr, this indicated that Whitlam would not try to negotiate with him about a general election but contact the Queen for his recall, which gave him the final reason to carry out the dismissal; he answered that it was too late to get in touch with the Palace because Whitlam was not prime minister any more. Whitlam, however, later disputed that such words were spoken, and stated that he asked Kerr whether he had consulted the Palace, to which Kerr replied that he did not need to, and that he had the advice of Barwick. Both accounts agree that Kerr then handed Whitlam a letter of dismissal and statement of reasons, stating that they would both have to live with this, to which Whitlam replied, "You certainly will." The dismissal concluded with Kerr wishing Whitlam luck in the election, and offering his hand, which the now former prime minister took.

Kerr's statement of reasons read:

Because of the federal nature of our Constitution and because of its provisions the Senate undoubtedly has constitutional power to refuse or defer supply to the Government. Because of the principles of responsible government a Prime Minister who cannot obtain supply, including money for carrying on the ordinary services of government, must either advise a general election or resign. If he refuses to do this I have the authority and indeed the duty under the Constitution to withdraw his Commission as Prime Minister. The position in Australia is quite different from a position in the United Kingdom. Here the confidence of both Houses on supply is necessary to ensure its provision. In the United Kingdom the confidence of the House of Commons alone is necessary. But both here and in the United Kingdom the duty of the Prime Minister is the same in a most important aspect – if he cannot get supply he must resign or advise an election.

— Governor-General Sir John Kerr, Statement (dated 11 November 1975)

After Whitlam left, Kerr called Fraser in, informed him of the dismissal, and asked if he would form a caretaker government, to which Fraser agreed. Fraser later stated that his overwhelming sensation at the news was relief. Fraser left to return to Parliament House, where he conferred with Coalition leaders, while Kerr joined the luncheon party that had been waiting for him, apologising to his guests and offering the excuse that he had been busy dismissing the Government.

=== Parliamentary strategy ===
Whitlam returned to The Lodge, where he had lunch. When his aides arrived, he informed them of his sacking. Whitlam drafted a resolution for the House, expressing confidence in his Government. No ALP Senate leaders were at The Lodge, nor did Whitlam and his party contact any when they drove back to Parliament House, confining their strategy to the House of Representatives.

Prior to Whitlam's dismissal, the Labor leadership decided to introduce a motion that the Senate pass the appropriation bills. With ALP senators unaware of Whitlam's sacking, that plan went ahead. Senator Doug McClelland, manager of the ALP government in the Senate, informed Coalition Senate leader Reg Withers of Labor's intent at about 1:30 pm. Withers then attended a leadership meeting where he learned of Fraser's appointment and assured the new prime minister he could secure supply. When the Senate convened, the ALP Senate leader, Ken Wriedt, made the motion to pass the appropriation bills. As Wriedt did so, he was told that the government had been sacked, which he initially refused to believe. Authoritative word did not reach Wriedt until 2:15 pm, by which time it was too late to withdraw the motion and instead obstruct his party's appropriation bill to hinder Fraser. At 2:24 pm, Labor's appropriation bills passed the Senate, fulfilling Fraser's first promise of providing supply.

In the House, desultory debate on Fraser's censure motion ended with it being amended by the ALP majority into a condemnation of Fraser and passed on a party line vote. By 2:34 pm, when Fraser rose and announced that he had been commissioned as prime minister, word of the dismissal had spread through the House. Fraser announced his intent to advise a double dissolution, and moved that the House adjourn. His motion was defeated. Fraser's new government suffered repeated defeats in the House, which passed a motion of no confidence in him, and asked the Speaker, Gordon Scholes, to urge the governor-general to recommission Whitlam. Scholes, attempting to communicate this to the governor-general, was initially told that an appointment might not be possible that day, but after stating that he would reconvene the House and tell them of the refusal, was given an appointment with Kerr for 4:45 pm.

=== Dissolution ===
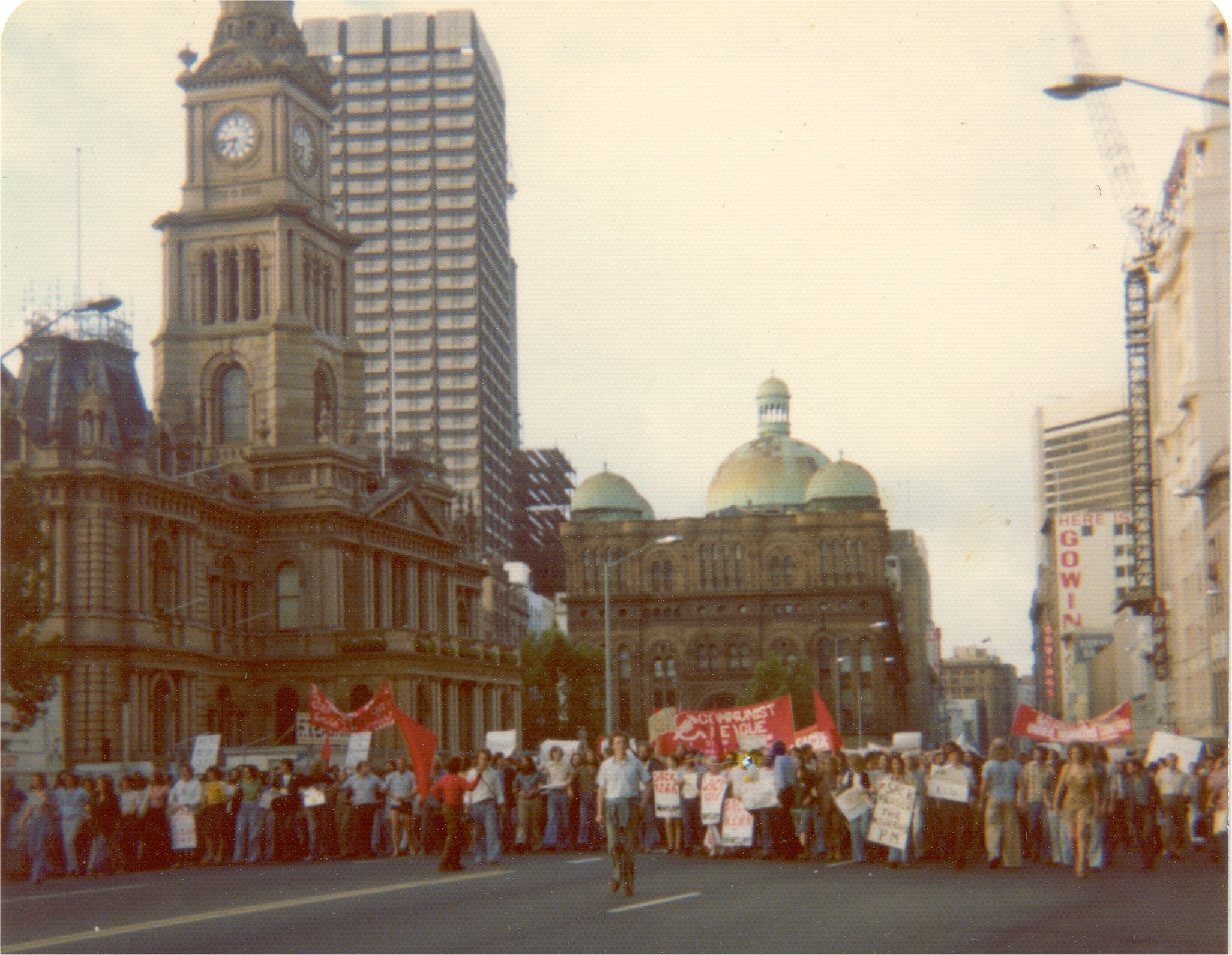
Protest in George Street, Sydney, outside the Sydney Town Hall, about 6:45 pm 11 November 1975 following news of the dismissal.

After the appropriation bills were approved by both Houses, they were sent over to Yarralumla where Kerr gave them royal assent. With supply assured, Kerr then received Fraser, who advised him that 21 bills (including the electoral redistribution bills) which had been introduced since the last election fulfilled the double dissolution provisions of section 57. Fraser asked that both Houses be dissolved for an election on 13 December. Kerr signed the proclamation dissolving Parliament, and sent his Official Secretary, David Smith, to proclaim the dissolution from the front steps of Parliament House.

At 4:45 pm, Kerr received Scholes, and informed him of the dissolution. Kerr wrote that "nothing else of relevance" took place between the two men, but Scholes's account is that he accused Kerr of bad faith for making an appointment to' receive the speaker, and then not waiting to hear from him before dissolving Parliament. Whitlam later stated that it would have been wiser for Scholes to take the appropriation bills with him, rather than having them sent ahead. Kerr's action was based on the advice he had received from two High Court judges (Mason and Chief Justice Barwick) and the Crown Law Officers (Byers and Clarence Harders, the Secretary of the Attorney-General's Department).

Whitlam delivering a speech on the steps of Parliament House after having been dismissed by Kerr

As Scholes and Kerr spoke, Smith reached Parliament House. The dismissal was by then publicly known, and an angry crowd of ALP supporters had gathered, filling the steps and spilling over both into the roadway and into Parliament House itself. Many of the demonstrators were ALP staffers; others were from the Australian National University. Smith was forced to enter Parliament House through a side door and make his way to the steps from the inside. He read the proclamation, though the boos of the crowd drowned him out, and concluded with the traditional "God save the Queen". Former prime minister Whitlam, who had been standing behind Smith, then addressed the crowd:

Ladies and gentlemen, well may we say God save the Queen, because nothing will save the Governor-General.

The proclamation which you have just heard read by the Governor-General's official secretary was countersigned 'Malcolm Fraser', who will undoubtedly go down in Australian history from Remembrance Day 1975 as Kerr's cur.

They won't silence the outskirts of Parliament House, even if the inside has been silenced for the next few weeks.

... Maintain your rage and enthusiasm through the campaign for the election now to be held and until polling day.

== Aftermath ==
=== Campaign ===
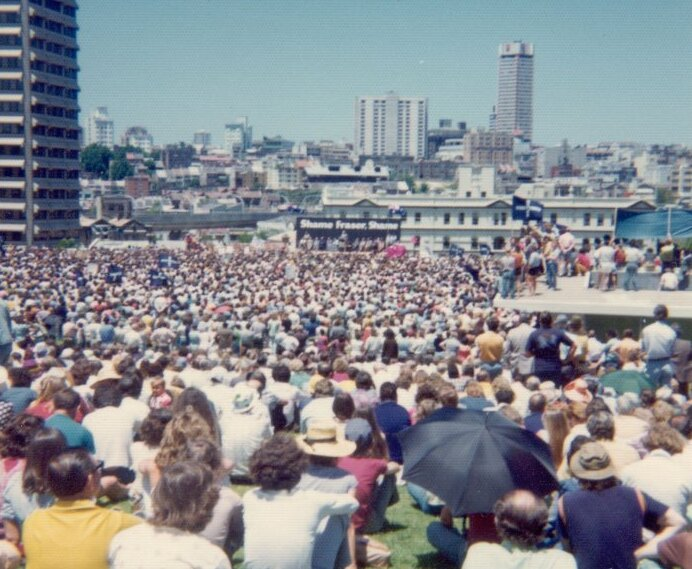
ALP policy launch before a huge crowd in the Sydney Domain on 24 November 1975

The news that Whitlam had been dismissed spread across Australia during the afternoon, triggering immediate protest demonstrations. On 12 November, Scholes wrote to the Queen, asking her to restore Whitlam as prime minister. The reply from her private secretary, Martin Charteris, dated 17 November 1975, stated:

As we understand the situation here, the Australian Constitution firmly places the prerogative powers of the Crown in the hands of the Governor-General as the representative of the Queen of Australia. The only person competent to commission an Australian Prime Minister is the Governor-General, and The Queen has no part in the decisions which the Governor-General must take in accordance with the Constitution. Her Majesty, as Queen of Australia, is watching events in Canberra with close interest and attention, but it would not be proper for her to intervene in person in matters which are so clearly placed within the jurisdiction of the Governor-General by the Constitution Act.

On 12 November 1975, the First Fraser Ministry was sworn in by Kerr. By some accounts, Kerr sought reassurance at that meeting that the Coalition senators would not have given in before supply ran out, "The Senate would never have caved in, would it?" According to those accounts, senator Margaret Guilfoyle laughed and said to a colleague, "That's all he knows". Guilfoyle later stated that, if she did make such a remark, it was not meant to imply that the Coalition senators would have broken. However, Kelly lists four Coalition senators who stated, in subsequent years, that they would have crossed the floor and voted for the appropriation bills.

Labor believed it had a chance of winning the election, and that the dismissal would be an electoral asset for them. However, some Labor strategists believed the party was heading for a disaster, with few economic accomplishments to point to and an electorate whose emotions would have cooled before polling day. Nonetheless, Whitlam, who began campaigning almost immediately after the dismissal, was met with huge crowds wherever he went; 30,000 people overspilled the Sydney Domain for the official campaign launch on 24 November. That evening, Whitlam made a major speech at Festival Hall in Melbourne before 7,500 people and a national TV audience, calling 11 November "Fraser's day of shame—a day that will live in infamy".

Polls were released at the end of the first week of campaigning, and showed a nine-point swing against Labor. Whitlam's campaign did not believe it at first, but additional polling made it clear that the electorate was turning against the ALP. The Coalition attacked Labor for the economic conditions, and released television commercials "The Three Dark Years" showing images from the Whitlam government scandals. The ALP campaign, which had concentrated on the issue of Whitlam's dismissal, did not begin to address the economy until its final days. By that time Fraser, confident of victory, was content to sit back, avoid specifics and make no mistakes. There was little violence in the campaign, but three letter bombs were placed in the post; one wounded two people in Bjelke-Petersen's office, while the other two, addressed to Kerr and Fraser, were intercepted and defused.

During the campaign, the Kerrs purchased a Sydney apartment, as John was prepared to resign in the event that the ALP triumphed. In the 13 December election, the Coalition won a record victory, with 91 seats in the House of Representatives to the ALP's 36 and a 35–27 majority in the expanded Senate.

=== Reactions ===
The dismissal is considered the greatest political and constitutional crisis in Australia's history. In 1977, the Fraser government proposed four constitutional amendments via referendum, three of which passed—the last time that the Australian Constitution has been amended. One of the amendments requires that a senator appointed to fill a casual vacancy be from the same party as the former senator. As of 2002, the Senate retains the power to block supply and the governor-general retains the power to dismiss a prime minister, but these powers have not been exercised.

In the wake of the dismissal, the ALP turned its anger on Kerr. Demonstrations marked his appearances, while the remaining ALP parliamentarians boycotted his opening of the new parliament. Whitlam, now leader of the Opposition, refused all invitations to events at Yarralumla, which the Kerrs continued to extend until his refusal of an invitation during the Queen's 1977 visit caused them to feel that no further efforts need be made. Whitlam never spoke with Kerr again. Even ALP parliamentarians who had been friends of Kerr broke off their relationships, feeling Kerr had betrayed the party and had ambushed Whitlam. Lady Kerr stated that she and her husband confronted a "new irrational scene swarming with instant enemies".

Whitlam repeatedly castigated Kerr for his role in the dismissal. When Kerr announced his resignation as governor-general on 14 July 1977, Whitlam commented: "How fitting that the last of the Bourbons should bow out on Bastille Day". After Kerr resigned as governor-general, he still sought a government position, reasoning that it had been his intent to remain for ten years as governor-general. However, Fraser's attempt to appoint Kerr as ambassador to UNESCO (a position later held by Whitlam) provoked such public outcry that the nomination was withdrawn. The Kerrs spent the next several years living in Europe, and when he died in Australia in 1991, his death was not announced until after he was buried. In 1991, Whitlam stated that no future governor-general was likely to act as Kerr did lest he also became the subject of "contempt and isolation". In 1997 he said that the letter of dismissal "had the shortcomings of being ex tempore, ex parte, ad hoc and sub rosa". In 2005, Whitlam called Kerr "a contemptible person". On the other hand, Country Party leader and deputy prime minister Doug Anthony said: "I can't forgive Gough for crucifying him". Sir Garfield Barwick was not spared Whitlam's invective; the former prime minister described him as "evil". Allegations have been made about CIA involvement in the Whitlam dismissal, although these were denied by both Kerr and Whitlam.

Whitlam resigned as ALP leader after the party suffered its second successive electoral defeat in 1977. Fraser served over seven years as prime minister, and left the Liberal leadership after the Coalition was defeated in the 1983 election. Years later, Whitlam and Fraser put aside their differences; Whitlam wrote in 1997 that Fraser "did not set out to deceive me". The two campaigned together in support of the 1999 referendum that would have made Australia a republic. According to Whitlam speechwriter Graham Freudenberg, "the residual rage over the conduct of the Queen's representative found a constructive outlet in the movement for the Australian Republic".

Freudenberg summed up Kerr's fate after the dismissal:

The beneficiaries of the Dismissal scarcely bothered to defend Kerr and in the end abandoned him. In the personal sense, Sir John Kerr himself became the real victim of the Dismissal, and history has accorded a brutal if poignant truth to Whitlam's declaration on the steps of Parliament House on 11 November 1975: "Well may we say 'God Save the Queen' – because nothing will save the Governor-General".

=== Assessment ===
In his 1995 survey of the events of the crisis, November 1975, Kelly places blame on Fraser for initiating the crisis and on Whitlam for using the crisis to try to break Fraser and the Senate. However, he places the most blame on Kerr, for failing to be candid with Whitlam about his intentions, and for refusing to offer a clear, final warning before dismissing him. According to Kelly,

[Kerr] should have unflinchingly and courageously met his responsibility to the Crown and to the Constitution. He should have spoken frankly with his Prime Minister from the start. He should have warned wherever and whenever appropriate. He should have realised that, whatever his fears, there was no justification for any other behaviour.

Kerr's predecessor as governor-general, Sir Paul Hasluck, believed that the fundamental reason for the crisis was the lack of trust and confidence between Whitlam and Kerr, and that the proper role of the governor-general had been to provide counsel, advice and warning.

Future Labor prime minister Paul Keating, who was Minister for Northern Australia in Whitlam's ministry, called the dismissal a "coup" and raised the idea to "arrest [Kerr]" and "lock him up", adding that he would not have "[taken] it lying down" if he was prime minister, during a 2013 interview with Kerry O'Brien.

== Royal involvement ==
Neither Whitlam nor Kerr ever suggested there had been any covert royal involvement. According to Whitlam's biographer Jenny Hocking, Kerr's papers in the National Archives of Australia reveal that he discussed with the Prince of Wales (later Charles III) his reserve powers and the possibility that he would dismiss the Whitlam government, in September 1975. Kerr asked what would happen if he dismissed Whitlam and the prime minister retaliated by dismissing him. According to Kerr, Charles had responded: "But surely, Sir John, the Queen should not have to accept advice that you should be recalled at the very time when you were considering having to dismiss the government". Kerr writes in his journal that Prince Charles informed the Queen's private secretary, Martin Charteris, of the conversation. Charteris then wrote to Kerr to say that, should the prime minister request the recall of the governor-general, the Queen "would take most unkindly to it. There would be considerable comings and goings, but ... at the end of the road The Queen, as a Constitutional Sovereign, would have no option but to follow the advice of her Prime Minister." Hocking argues the letter is alarming as "the involvement of the Queen in any discussion with Kerr about his tenure unknown to the prime minister, was manifestly improper [as] the appointment and recall of a governor-general is clearly and unquestionably a decision for the Australian prime minister alone". She also suggests that the letter indicates that the palace approved of dismissal, quoting Professor Paul Rodan that "Only the most obtuse of governors-general could fail to interpret [the letter] as a favourable sign". Conversely, Paul Kelly and Troy Bramstone argues against this interpretation, stating that the reference to the "considerable comings and goings" referred to the fact that dismissal would require written notice, not just a phone call. They argue that the letter "demonstrate[s] beyond question that the Queen would remove Kerr on Whitlam's advice".

Beginning in 2012, Hocking attempted to gain the release of correspondence between the Queen's advisors and Kerr regarding the dismissal, held by the National Archives. In 2016, Hocking launched a federal court action against the National Archives seeking the release of the "Palace letters", correspondence between Kerr, the Queen and Charteris held by the archives but not available for view. The action was lost in the full court, but on 29 May 2020 Hocking's appeal to the High Court succeeded: in a majority six to one decision the High Court held that the Palace letters are "Commonwealth records" (not personal property) and therefore available for public release under the provisions of the Archives Act 1983.

On 14 July 2020, the letters were released online without redaction. They revealed that, although Kerr had corresponded with Charteris about whether he had the constitutional authority to dismiss Whitlam, he had not informed the Queen in advance of his decision to do so. However, the letters also revealed that Kerr had discussed the possibility of dismissing Whitlam as early as July 1975. Also, on 2 October 1975, Charteris confirmed in a letter that Kerr had discussed with Charles the possibility that Whitlam could ask the Queen to dismiss Kerr.

== Popular culture ==
The 1983 miniseries The Dismissal dramatised the events of the crisis. It featured Max Phipps as Whitlam, John Meillon as Kerr and John Stanton as Fraser. A musical adaptation of the events was staged by the Sydney Theatre Company in 2023.

== See also ==
- Easter Crisis of 1920 in Denmark
- King–Byng Affair, a similar Canadian constitutional crisis in 1926
- 1953 Pakistani constitutional coup
- 2008–09 Canadian parliamentary dispute
- 2011–12 Papua New Guinean constitutional crisis
- Tuvaluan constitutional crisis of 2013
- 2018 Sri Lankan constitutional crisis
- Government shutdowns in the United States

== Bibliography ==
- Ayres, Philip (1987), Malcolm Fraser, William Heinemann Australia, ISBN 978-0-85561-060-9
- Brown, Wallace (2002), Ten Prime Ministers: Life Among the Politicians, Loungeville Books, ISBN 978-1-920681-04-3
- Cohen, Barry (1996), Life With Gough, Allen & Unwin, ISBN 978-1-86448-169-3
- Freudenberg, Graham (2009), A Certain Grandeur: Gough Whitlam's Life in Politics (revised ed.), Viking, ISBN 978-0-670-07375-7
- Hocking, Jenny (2017), The Dismissal Dossier. The Palace Connection: Everything You Were Never Meant to Know About November 1975 (revised ed.), Melbourne UP, ISBN 978-0-522-87301-6
- Kelly, Paul (1983), The Dismissal, Angus & Robertson Publishers, ISBN 978-0-207-14860-6
- Kelly, Paul (1995), November 1975, Allen & Unwin, ISBN 978-1-86373-987-0
- Kerr, John (1978), Matters for Judgment, Macmillan, ISBN 978-0-333-25212-3
- Lloyd, Clem (2008), "Edward Gough Whitlam", in Grattan, Michelle (ed.), Australian Prime Ministers (revised ed.), New Holland Publishers Pty Ltd, pp. 324–354, ISBN 978-1-74110-727-2
- Markwell, Donald (2016). Constitutional Conventions and the Headship of State: Australian Experience. Connor Court. ISBN 9781925501155.
- McMinn, Winston (1979), A Constitutional History of Australia, Oxford University Press, ISBN 978-0-19-550562-7
- Reid, Alan (1976), The Whitlam Venture, Hill of Content, ISBN 978-0-85572-079-7
- Truu, Maani (2025), "The Quiet Coup", Australian Broadcasting Corporation
- Whitlam, Gough (1979), The Truth of the Matter, Allen Lane, ISBN 978-0-7139-1291-3
- Whitlam, Gough (1997), Abiding Interests, University of Queensland Press, ISBN 978-0-7022-2879-7
