= Gair Affair =

1974 Australian political incident

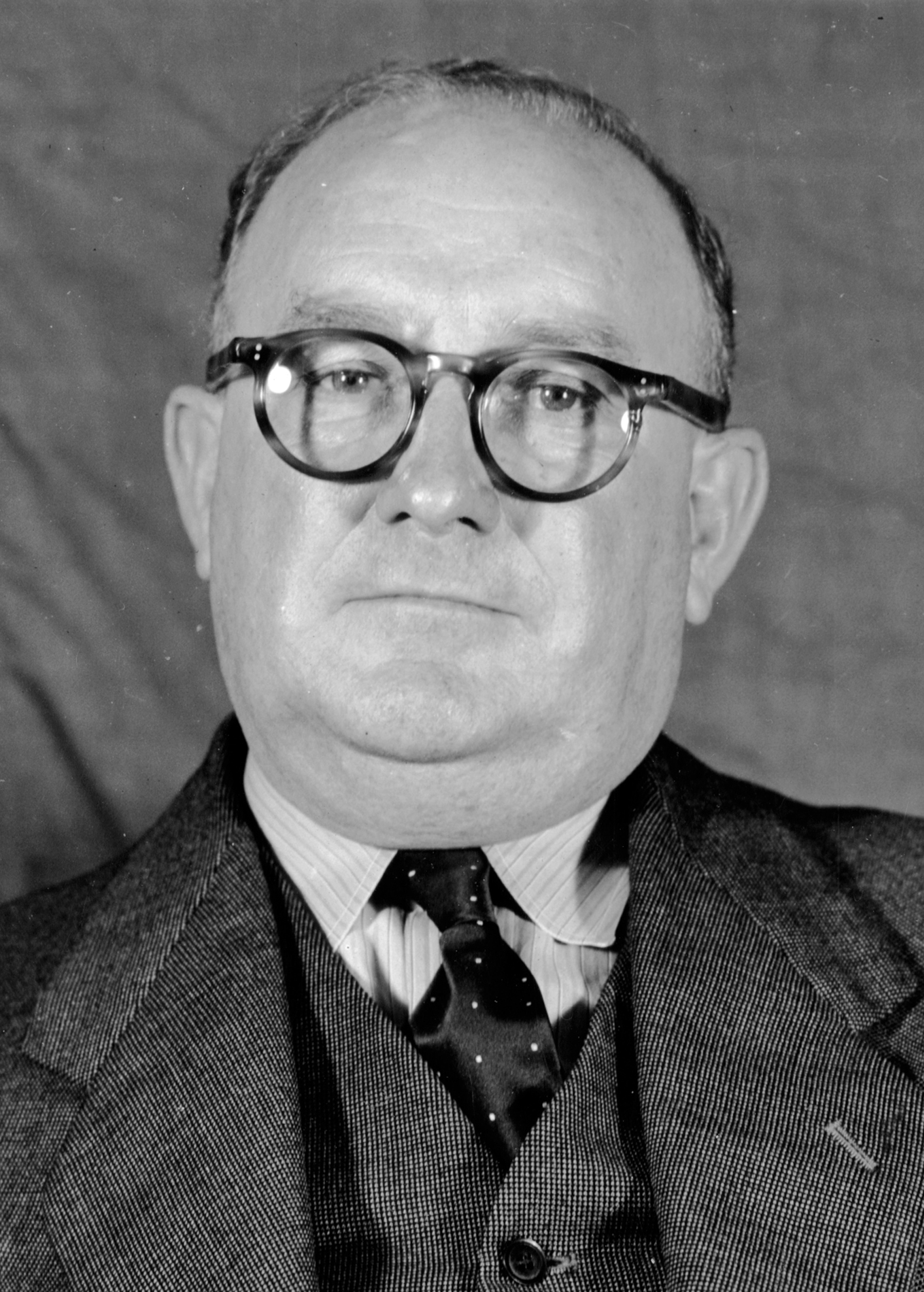
Vince Gair

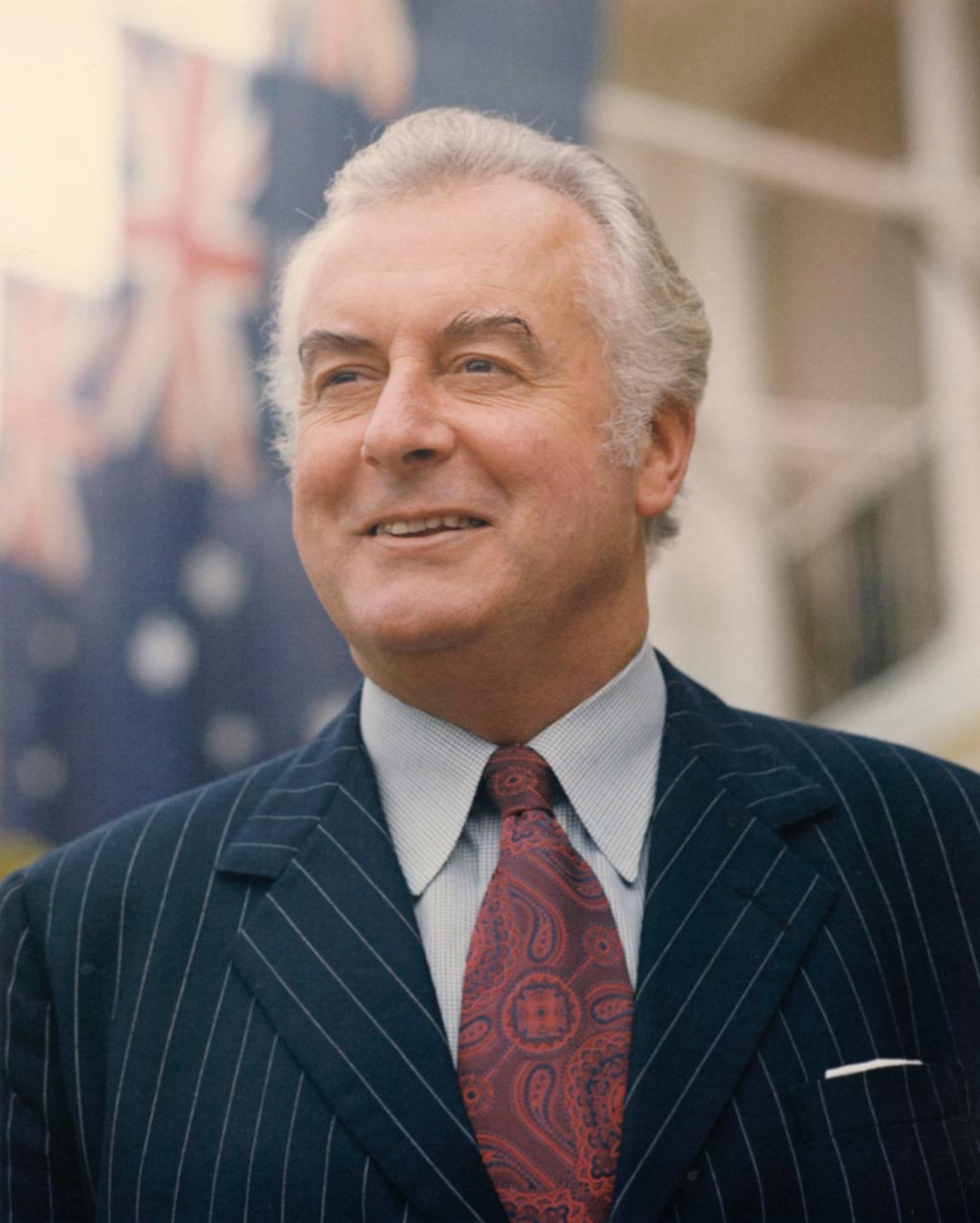
Gough Whitlam

The Gair Affair was an episode in Australian political life in 1974, during the government led by the Labor Prime Minister Gough Whitlam. Whitlam offered the post of Ambassador to Ireland to a non-government senator from Queensland, Vince Gair, in the hope that this would improve Labor's chance of gaining a majority in the Senate at the forthcoming general election. Whitlam's plan was foiled by the Premier of Queensland, Joh Bjelke-Petersen, during what came to be known as "The Night of the Long Prawns", but the matter was overtaken by events when Whitlam decided to call a double dissolution election.

Jenny Hocking has said of the affair: "The government's attempts to effect an additional Senate vacancy through Gair's resignation was constitutionally sound, strategically brilliant and an unmitigated political disaster."

== Background ==
At the 1972 election, Gough Whitlam led the Australian Labor Party to its first success at the federal level in 23 years. Although another election for the House of Representatives was not due until early 1976, an election for half the Senate was required earlier. Normally, these elections are held on the same day, but they had become out of synchronisation in 1963 due to the then Prime Minister Sir Robert Menzies calling an early House election. Between 1963 and 1972, elections for the Senate and House of Representatives were held separately. The last half-Senate election was held on 21 November 1970, senators' terms commencing on 1 July 1971. Another half-Senate election had to be held in time for senators to commence their terms on 1 July 1974. Such an election could have been called for any time from early August 1973, but Whitlam was in no hurry.

Although Labor controlled the House of Representatives with a 9-seat majority, it was 5 seats short of a majority in the Senate. Consequently, Labor faced constant opposition in getting its legislation through the parliament. By March 1974, a number of bills had been twice rejected by the Senate, which gave Whitlam the capacity to call a double dissolution, in which the entire parliament would be up for election. If the government were returned, it could reintroduce the bills in question, and if they were rejected by the Senate a third time, the government could seek to hold a joint sitting of the Senate and House.

In early March 1974, however, such a course of action was not under active consideration. It was an option that had only ever been used twice before (in 1914, when the government was defeated; and 1951, when the government was returned with a reduced majority in the lower house, albeit now with a majority in the Senate) and was regarded as somewhat extreme. Also, Labor felt it needed more time to improve its electoral stocks before considering such a move. Whitlam still only intended to call a half-Senate election, even though this would continue the lack of synchronicity between the elections of the houses, something he had often deplored. In debates in parliament and in outside commentary, he often decried the fact that senators elected in 1967 and 1970 were able to frustrate the will of a government elected in 1972.

Section 12 of the Constitution provides that the writ for a Senate election in each State is issued by the State Governor.

== Vince Gair ==
Vincent Clair Gair was a former Australian Labor Party (ALP) Premier of Queensland 1952-57 who was expelled from his own party while in office, and formed the breakaway Queensland Labor Party (QLP), which in 1962 merged with the Democratic Labor Party (DLP). In 1964 he was elected to federal parliament as a DLP Senator for Queensland, his term commencing on 1 July 1965. He was elected parliamentary leader of the DLP immediately although it had only two members at that time (Frank McManus from Victoria was the other). He was re-elected in 1970 for a new term (1971–1977). In 1973, by which time the DLP's Senate numbers had risen to five, internal issues caused Gair to resign as leader of the party from 10 October, with McManus taking over. He had first intimated in January 1973 that he would resign as leader, but vacillated until October, when Frank McManus offered him the choice of immediate resignation or being removed by his colleagues.

Gair announced at that time that his current term as senator would be his last. In March 1974 he also complained to the ALP senator Justin O'Byrne that the DLP had treated him shabbily. He said he was thinking of leaving the Senate earlier than 1977, and suggested that he would consider accepting a diplomatic post should the government be minded to offer him one. O'Byrne repeated this conversation to his Senate Leader Lionel Murphy, who devised a plan to use Gair's disgruntlement to the ALP's advantage, which he talked over with Whitlam. The plan was to appoint Gair to an overseas post, which would require him to resign his seat in the Senate, and to arrange for this to occur before the writs for the impending half-Senate election were issued. This would have the effect of causing writs to be issued for the election of 6 senators from Queensland, not the 5 as would otherwise have been the case (at that time, each state had 10 senators, and 5 of them were elected at each half-Senate election). Gair was not the only non-ALP person in the ALP's sights: they also offered the post of Ambassador to the Holy See to Frank McManus (he refused outright); and they had been considering offering Liberal senator Peter Durack a seat on the High Court, but never approached him.

This plan also relied on a feature of the Constitution at that time, which was amended in 1977. While now senators appointed to fill a casual vacancy serve the remainder of the original senator's term, in 1973 the appointed senator's term only lasted until the next Senate or House election. In a normal half-Senate election, the ALP could expect to win 2 of the 5 seats in Queensland. However, if 6 seats were up for election, the ALP could expect to win 3, and this would give it the bare majority it needed in the Senate to guarantee passage of future legislation.

Gair was offered the post of Ambassador to Ireland, and readily accepted on 13 March 1974. Ireland was dear to his heart, as his mother was Irish, his wife was of Irish stock, and he was a staunch Catholic, and he saw this as a particularly fitting way to conclude his public life. However, the matter needed to remain strictly confidential pending various matters of protocol being attended to. The Federal Executive Council approved the appointment on 14 March, and the Irish Government accepted the appointment on 19 March. It cabled its approval to Canberra, where it was received on 20 March.

On 21 March, Gough Whitlam advised the Parliament that he had obtained the concurrence of the Governor-General, Sir Paul Hasluck, to hold a half-Senate election on 18 May 1974, and the timing of the issue of the writs was a matter of discussion between the Governor-General and the state governors.

The ALP's plan was that Gair would tender his resignation to the President of the Senate, Sir Magnus Cormack, on 2 April, when the Senate returned after a break, well before the writs were expected to be issued for the election, but for it to remain a strictly confidential matter until then.

== The Night of the Long Prawns ==
On the morning of 2 April, The Sun News-Pictorial newspaper broke the news of Gair's appointment to Ireland. In Parliament, the Leader of the Opposition, Billy Snedden, asked Prime Minister Whitlam to come clean. He readily confirmed the appointment. Snedden decried it as shameful and "worse than any Tammany Hall effort that has ever been made in the United States", and compared it with what he called the "very fine appointment" of Sir Garfield Barwick as Chief Justice of the High Court.

The Leader of the National Country Party (NCP), Doug Anthony, denounced the appointment as a cynical buying-off exercise. He was aware that the timing was crucial, and he phoned the NCP Premier of Queensland, Joh Bjelke-Petersen, urging him to have the writs for the Queensland Senate seats issued immediately before Gair had a chance to see Cormack and resign. Senator Ian Wood also contacted Bjelke-Petersen along similar lines. But Gair had to be kept at bay while the Governor of Queensland, Sir Colin Hannah, was consulted about the matter, as it was his sole prerogative under the Constitution to issue writs for Senate elections, albeit always acting on advice from the premier of the day. NCP Queensland Senator Ron Maunsell entertained Vince Gair and other senators in his office, plying him with drinks and prawns he regularly brought all the way from his home in Townsville. Ian Wood also had a hand in arranging this; he was a teetotaller, but had no scruples about arranging for others to use alcohol to further his political goals. But Gair also had to appear in the Senate chamber and vote where necessary; the Opposition was aware the government would likely claim he had effectively resigned in March when his appointment as Ambassador was approved, as this was an office of profit under the crown, which serving members and senators are prohibited from accepting on pain of forfeiture of their parliamentary seats. If Gair was appearing in parliament right up till 2 April, with no objections from the government, the Opposition reasoned that the government could hardly credibly hold to the line that he had ceased to be a senator in March, or at any time before the issue of the writs for Queensland. Thus Maunsell stayed close to Gair the whole evening, shepherded him into the Senate chamber for a vote on the Petroleum and Minerals Authority Bill, and then straight back to his office for more whisky and prawns. In fact, he did not need to do this, since the electoral legislation deems writs to be issued at 6 pm regardless of the time they are actually issued. As long as Gair was prevented from seeing the President until 6 pm, the plan would work. Maunsell later made a personal explanation to the Senate, in which he denied exerting any undue influence on Gair; he explained that the Parliamentary Dining Rooms had gone on strike in the morning, Gair had not eaten all day, Maunsell was simply extending courtesy to a fellow Queensland senator, and Gair was free at all times to come and go as he pleased.

The Senate sat through until 12:30 am on the morning of 3 April, and Gair did not finally leave for home until around 3 am. About 90 minutes earlier, at 1:40 am, Bjelke-Petersen announced to the Queensland Parliament that the Governor had, on his recommendation, issued writs for the election of five senators at 11 pm on 2 April.

The ALP had been stymied, and the evening of 2–3 April 1974 has been known ever since in Australian political discourse as "The Night of the Long Prawns" thanks to a newspaper headline in The Australian of 4 April, to an article written by Bob Baudino.

On 3 April, Vince Gair was expelled from the party of which he had been leader until just over four months earlier. At this time he said to his erstwhile DLP colleagues, "I've carried you, bastards, for years, and now you can all go to buggery!"

== Gair's letter ==
In the afternoon of 3 April, Gair was finally able to have his formal advice about his status conveyed to Sir Magnus Cormack through the Clerk of the Senate. However, it was not so much a letter of resignation, as a letter advising of his constitutional ineligibility to remain a senator due to his acceptance of the ambassadorship - the very argument that the Opposition had foreseen. The letter had been prepared by the Government and edited by Gair, and it said:

Dear Mr President,
I publicly announced yesterday that I had accepted appointment as Australian Ambassador to the Republic of Ireland. I endeavoured to communicate this to you personally yesterday and to inform you of my position, but regrettably you were unavailable when I sought to see you.
My appointment was approved by the Governor-General on 14 March 1974, with my knowledge and consent. I was informed on 20 March that the Government of Ireland had communicated its agreement to my appointment.
As you are aware, the position of Ambassador is an office of profit under the Crown and also carries with it fees for services rendered to the Commonwealth, within the meaning of Section 45 of the Constitution, which I had agreed to take.
The effect of my appointment as Ambassador was to vacate my place as a Senator by virtue of the Constitution.
It is with regret that I decided after receiving the offer to leave the Senate and the many friends I made during my nine years here. I would like to personally thank you for our association in that period first as Senate colleagues and later under your Presidency.
Yours faithfully
V.C.Gair

The Senate President was unsure whether this letter amounted to a resignation; or whether Gair's seat had become vacant at all; and if it did, from when - so he put the question to the Senate for their consideration. The ALP argued that Gair had ceased to be a senator on either 14 March (when the Executive Council approved the ambassadorship) or 20 March (when the Irish Government accepted his appointment), but in any case well before the issue of the writs on 2 April. Opposition senators questioned why the Government did not alert the Senate to the presence of a stranger in its midst as soon as the appointment became effective, if that was its position. Senator Lionel Murphy deflected all such criticisms on the basis that it was a matter for Senator Gair to initiate the appropriate communications about his status to the President, which he did at the earliest opportunity. Turgid and legalistic discussion on the matter occupied much of the Senate's time on 3, 4, 8, 9 and 10 April 1974, without any resolution. Murphy arranged for a legal opinion supporting the government's position to be provided by the Solicitor-General of Australia, Maurice Byers, which was read out to the Senate. The matter was also extensively canvassed in the House of Representatives during this period.

== Double dissolution and aftermath ==
In the evening of 10 April the whole matter became academic when Gough Whitlam advised the House of Representatives that Governor-General Hasluck had agreed to a double dissolution, the election for both houses to be held on the already announced date of 18 May 1974. The Parliament was dissolved on 11 April. In his valedictory remarks, Sir Magnus Cormack described it as the most turbulent Senate since Federation.

According to the official record of the Senate, Vince Gair remained a senator until 11 April 1974, at which time he retired.

At the election, all five Senate seats held by the DLP were lost, and that was the effective end of the party as a viable force in Australian politics. The party was wound up in 1978. The ALP was returned with a reduced majority of five in the lower house, and it remained without a majority in the Senate. The six twice-rejected bills were introduced again, and rejected a third time, but they were all finally passed at the historic joint sitting in August. One of the bills was subsequently struck down on procedural grounds.

Vince Gair took up his post as Ambassador to Ireland in early May 1974, but his behaviour there was often considered inappropriate and he was recalled by the Liberal–National Coalition government of Malcolm Fraser in early 1976.

== See also ==
- 1977 Australian referendum (Senate Casual Vacancies)
