= Australian Privacy Foundation =

The Australian Privacy Foundation is an NGO formed for the purpose of protecting the privacy rights of Australians. Its aim is to focus public attention on emerging issues which pose a threat to the freedom and privacy of Australians, and also takes a leading role on issues of defending rights of individuals to control access to personal information and to be free of excessive intrusions.

== History ==
The organisation was initially formed on 31 August 1987 at the Sebel Town House, Kings Cross, Sydney for the sole purpose of coordinating public resistance against the Australia Card, first proposed as part of the 1985 Federal Budget. The media were attracted to the launch on account of support for the movement by a number of high-profile persons including Peter Garrett, Alan Jones, Ben Lexcen, and Janine Haines.

After the group led the charge in successfully defeating the Australia Card, it was clear to the group that an ongoing national voice for privacy protection was needed in Australia. During the remaining years of the 1980s, the Foundation's focus was to ensure that the tax file number (TFN) scheme did not become an ID Card in disguise, and to lobby both state and federal governments for the enactment of national privacy legislation. The first summit organised by the Foundation brought together officials from the Australian Taxation Office, politicians and privacy advocates together to examine the TFN proposals, and exposed many weaknesses in the proposals which the Government was subsequently forced to rectify.

The organisation has remained strongly focussed on policy matters. It has made many submissions to Parliamentary Committees, government agencies, industry associations and corporations. It has run a number of campaigns, in relation to such matters as credit reporting, government proposals to create identification schemes, and privacy and the media. Since 2008, it has become more proactive, developing a series of Policy Statements on matters of particular significance.

The organisation also provides a set of resources for people undertaking research into privacy issues in Australia. These include outlines of and links to privacy oversight agencies, and NGOs in the privacy, human rights and consumer rights space, and titles of and links to laws in Australia's nine jurisdictions that provide privacy protections.

== Board ==
The organisation operated continuously for its first 15 years, but on an informal basis. This included the establishment of a web-site in 1998. It was incorporated in 2002. The organisation has a governing board, consisting of fifteen members of whom four are officers (Chair, two Vice-Chairs, a Treasurer and a Secretary). Members are appointed for a period of one year, with all positions falling vacant at the next Annual General Meeting. The Board is supported by an Advisory Panel of leading Australian public figures.

== The Smith Awards ==
In 2005 the Australian Privacy Foundation announced the Smith Awards. These are named conjointly after:

- Winston Smith, the protagonist of George Orwell's novel Nineteen Eighty-Four
- the common use of the name Smith as a pseudonym to protect one's anonymity, and
- Ewart Smith, the Australian retired public servant who was instrumental in the demise of the Australia Card Bill in 1987.

== Bibliography ==
- The Loose Cannon: An overview of campaigns of opposition to National Identity Card proposals by Simon Davies, Director, Privacy International and Visiting Fellow, The London School of Economics (London, February 2004)
