= Magnus Cormack =

Australian politician (1906–1994)

The Honourable Sir Magnus Cormack KBE
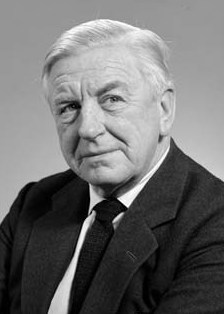

President of the Senate
- In office 17 August 1971 – 8 July 1974
- Preceded by: Alister McMullin
- Succeeded by: Justin O'Byrne

Senator for Victoria
- In office 1 July 1962 – 30 June 1978
- In office 28 April 1951 – 30 June 1953

Personal details
- Born: 12 February 1906 Wick, Caithness, Scotland
- Died: 26 November 1994 (aged 88) Melbourne, Victoria, Australia
- Party: Liberal
- Spouse: Mavis Macmeikan (m. 1935)

Sir Magnus Cameron Cormack KBE (12 February 1906 – 26 November 1994) was an Australian politician. He was a member of the Liberal Party and served multiple terms as a Senator for Victoria (1951–1953, 1962–1978), including as President of the Senate from 1971 to 1974.

Cormack was born in the Scottish Highlands and came to Australia as a child. He grew up in Adelaide and worked as a production manager with Holden for several years, later farming near Apsley, Victoria. During World War II he served in the New Guinea campaign and attained the rank of major. Cormack's first term in the Senate lasted only two years, during which he notably opposed the Menzies Government's attempt to ban the Communist Party. After several unsuccessful candidacies, he was re-elected at the 1961 federal election, becoming known for his committee work and support of John Gorton. Cormack was elected to the Senate presidency in 1971 and retained the position for the first term of the Whitlam government. After leaving politics he served as chairman of radio station 3XY. The proceeds from the sale of the radio licence were subsequently used to establish the Cormack Foundation, an investment vehicle for the Liberal Party.

== Early life ==
Cormack was born on 12 February 1906 in Wick, Caithness, Scotland. He was the oldest of five children born to Violet (née Cameron) and William Petrie Cormack. His maternal grandfather John Macdonald Cameron was a Liberal Party member of the British House of Commons. Cormack's father, a medical doctor, decided to relocate to Australia for health reasons. A distant cousin was Sir Josiah Symon, a Senator for South Australia, who was also born in Wick. The family arrived in Adelaide in about 1912, and settled on the Eyre Peninsula south of Whyalla. Having begun his formal education in Scotland, Cormack attended a state school in Tumby Bay and then boarded at St Peter's College, Adelaide. From 1926 to 1931, he worked as a production manager with Holden.

During the Great Depression, Cormack went into dairy farming. In later life he observed "I had three dairy farms, and I lost money on every one of them, so I claim to know something about dairying". By 1934, he and his brothers John and William had acquired Koijak, a grazing property near Apsley, Victoria, close to the South Australian border. On 22 November 1935, Cormack married Mary Isabel Macmeikan (known as Mavis) at the registrar's office in Melbourne; she was a divorcee. The couple had four children together.

== Military service ==
Cormack enlisted in the Militia in July 1940, and was posted to anti-aircraft regiments at Puckapunyal and Werribee. He was discharged in October 1940, but re-enlisted in June 1941 and was commissioned as a lieutenant. He received postings to the Royal Military College, Duntroon, the headquarters of the Australian Imperial Force, and the Staff College. He transferred to the regular army in August 1942. In July 1943, Cormack arrived in Port Moresby as part of the headquarters staff of the II Corps. He moved to the New Guinea Force in January 1944, where he spent four months before leaving for Townsville and receiving his discharge. He finished the war with the rank of major and was mentioned in dispatches for "gallant and distinguished service in Papua".

== Early political involvement ==
Cormack was a member of the Young Nationalists before the war, and joined the Liberal Party in 1946. At the 1947 Victorian state election, he managed William McDonald's campaign in the seat of Dundas, helping defeat the long-serving Labor incumbent Bill Slater. Cormack was subsequently recruited to the federal policy committee, at the urging of Robert Menzies and Richard Casey. He was state president of the Victorian Liberals from 1948 to 1949. Cormack stood for the House of Representatives at the 1949 federal election, losing to Bill Bourke in the Division of Fawkner by just 27 votes. In a speech to the Melbourne University Liberal Club in April 1950, he urged Australia to take possession of Dutch New Guinea and populate it with white settlers, in order to pre-empt an Indonesian takeover.

== Senator ==
At the 1951 election, Cormack was elected to the Senate in fifth place on the Coalition ticket in Victoria. He was one of the few Liberals to oppose the Menzies Government's attempts to ban the Communist Party, telling Menzies that it was "draconian". His first span in the Senate lasted only two years, as he was defeated at the 1953 half-Senate election. Shortly before his term ended, he was one of the senators chosen to represent Australia at the coronation of Elizabeth II. Prior to the 1954 election, Cormack unsuccessfully contested Liberal preselection for the Division of Wannon. His opponent was future prime minister Malcolm Fraser, who was 23 years old at the time. Fraser had not expected to win, but mounted a strong grassroots campaign and impressed with his public speaking ability. Cormack stood for the Senate at the 1955 election without success, and then the following year was defeated by George Hannan in a ballot to fill the casual vacancy caused by John Spicer's resignation. His losses led journalist Don Whitington to describe him as "the unluckiest man in post-war Australian politics".

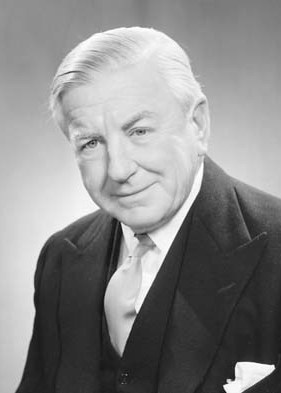
Cormack in 1962

Cormack won first place on the Coalition ticket at the 1961 election, and was elected to a six-year Senate term commencing on 1 July 1962. He would be re-elected to further six-year terms at the 1967 and 1974 elections. The latter was cut short by a double dissolution, and at the 1975 election he won a three-year term ending on 30 June 1978. Cormack was chairman of the Joint Committee on Foreign Affairs from 1967 to 1969, and from 1970 to 1971 chaired the Select Committee on Securities and Exchange. The latter committee's report into financial malpractices received praise from the media, with The Age describing it as "probably the most incisive, impressive and influential document the Senate has ever produced". In the 1970 New Year Honours, Cormack was made a Knight Commander of the Order of the British Empire (KBE), "for long political and public service".

After the disappearance of Prime Minister Harold Holt in 1967, Cormack played a role in John Gorton's ascension to the prime ministership. Their association dated back to the 1940s, when Cormack had helped recruit Gorton into the Liberal Party. According to Alan Reid, Liberal MPs "filed in and out of Cormack's room, some from other states, as votes for Gorton were lined up during the leadership struggle". The Liberal Party senators formed Gorton's power base, and Cormack helped keep them on-side during William McMahon's leadership challenges. Reid described him as "a manoeuvrer who preferred to work in the shadows than in strong sunlight".

== President of the Senate ==
The Hon. Sir Magnus Cameron Cormack KBE - 1973 portrait by Bryan Westwood

Following the retirement of Alister McMullin, Cormack was elected President of the Senate on 17 August 1971, defeating Labor's Justin O'Byrne by 31 votes to 26. He had earlier defeated Reg Withers to become the Coalition's nominee for the position, despite Withers having the support of Prime Minister William McMahon. As president, Cormack was known as a defender of parliamentary sovereignty over the executive. He strongly supported the expansion of the committee system, which was a relatively recent innovation, and believed the Senate should function "largely as a committee chamber" rather than simply mirroring the House of Representatives. Fearing it was "degenerating into a propaganda forum", Cormack introduced new conventions for question time, allowing government ministers to terminate questions without notice and refusing to allow questions to be directed to assistant ministers. He also allowed ministers to cut short debate on a bill by simply moving that it be considered "urgent".

The Labor Party did not secure a majority in the Senate at the 1972 federal election, despite winning government. Cormack was re-elected to the presidency with the support of the Democratic Labor Party's five senators. While presiding over the chamber he was generally regarded as fair and impartial – Labor's John Wheeldon regarded him as "completely non-partisan". In January 1973, he refused a request from the Liberal Party to unilaterally recall the Senate, stating he would only do so on the advice of the government. Cormack played a role in the "Gair Affair" of 1974, which had implications for the Whitlam government's ability to pass legislation through the Senate. He refused to accept Vince Gair's purported resignation letter, instead judging it to be ambiguous and allowing the Senate to debate whether it should be accepted.

After the 1974 election, the balance of power in the Senate was shared by Steele Hall of the Liberal Movement and Michael Townley. Cormack defeated Ian Wood to become the Coalition's nominee for the presidency. It was expected that the vote for the presidency would be tied at 30 votes each for Cormack and the Labor nominee Justin O'Byrne, with the result determined by drawing lots. However, at least one Coalition senator voted for O'Byrne, who defeated Cormack by 31 votes to 29.

== Later years ==
In August 1974, Cormack and James Webster unsuccessfully challenged the legality of the first joint sitting of parliament. The High Court unanimously ruled that their challenge was invalid. Cormack remained an active player in the Senate after losing the presidency. He crossed the floor a total of twelve times during his career, and was a leading opponent of the Fraser government's 1977 referendum proposals; he chaired a campaign urging voters to vote "No" on all four questions. He was particularly critical of the proposal for simultaneous elections for the House and Senate, which was the only question where the "No" vote prevailed; he described it as "a fraud and a deceit" which would eventually lead to the Senate's abolition.

In March 1975, Cormack held a dinner party at his flat in Toorak, where he and other leading Liberals discussed how to remove Billy Snedden from the leadership. The leading contenders to replace Snedden were Andrew Peacock and Malcolm Fraser. Cormack was known to support Peacock, who was a close friend and something of a protégé. However, he only invited Fraser to the dinner party. Fraser was suspicious of Cormack's motives, particularly when he was asked to leave by jumping over the back fence – supposedly to avoid photographers who were waiting outside the front door. Fraser suspected Cormack had actually arranged someone to wait by the back fence and photograph him climbing over, hoping to embarrass him and thus further Peacock's chances. He chose to leave by the front door, where there were in fact no photographers.

After leaving parliament, Cormack served as the chairman of 3XY, one of Melbourne's most popular music radio stations. The station had strong ties to the Liberal Party, and its articles of association provided that any proceeds from its sale would be transferred to organisations with shared goals. When the station licence was sold for $15 million in 1986, Cormack initially wished to divide the money between the Institute of Public Affairs, the Centre for Independent Studies, and other similar think tanks. However, Liberal Party official John Calvert-Jones convinced him that the money should be used to establish a new entity, which was named the Cormack Foundation. According to The Australian, the foundation's capital had grown to almost $70 million by 2017, and it had disbursed $60 million in dividends to the Liberal Party since its creation.

Cormack died in Melbourne on 26 November 1994, aged 88, after years of ill health. A memorial service was held at Old Parliament House.

Parliament of Australia
Preceded by Alister McMullin	President of the Senate; 1971–1974	Succeeded by Justin O'Byrne
