= Health Insurance Commission Act 1973 =

Parliament of Australia
- Long title: An Act to constitute a Health Insurance Commission and for purposes connected therewith.
- Citation: Health Insurance Commission Act 1973 (No. 41 of 1974)
- Royal assent: 8 August 1974
- Status: Current legislation

The Health Insurance Commission Act 1973 is an Act of the Parliament of Australia. It was passed into Australian law in the Joint Sitting of the Australian Parliament of 1974.
