= Joint Sitting of the Australian Parliament of 1974 =

Only joint sitting of the Australian parliament

Composition of the Joint Sitting Government (95) Labor (95) (Note: Labor seats: House of Representatives (66), Senate (29)) Opposition (90) Liberal (63) (Note: Liberal seats: House of Representatives (40), Senate (23)) Country (27) (Note: Country seats: House of Representatives (21), Senate (6)) Crossbench (2) (Note: Both crossbenchers were Senators) Liberal Movement (1) Independent (1) (Note: The independent senator was Michael Townley (Tasmania).)

The Joint Sitting of the Parliament of Australia of 1974 remains the only time that members of both houses of the federal parliament of Australia, the Senate and House of Representatives, have sat together as a single legislative body pursuant to section 57 of the Constitution. The joint sitting was held on 6 and 7 August 1974, following the double dissolution 1974 federal election.

This sitting deliberated and voted upon the following bills:

- Commonwealth Electoral Bill (No. 2) 1973, which sought to make Commonwealth electorates more even in size by reducing the allowable quota variation from 20 per cent to 10 per cent.
- Senate (Representation of Territories) Bill 1973, which gave the Australian Capital Territory and the Northern Territory two senators each.
- Representation Bill 1973, which stated that neither the people of the territories nor the territory senators could be included in the formula for determining the number of House seats for each state
- Health Insurance Bill 1973, which was the main bill that established Medibank (now known as Medicare).
- Health Insurance Commission Bill 1973, which established the Medibank administrative agency, the Health Insurance Commission (now known as Medicare).
- Petroleum and Minerals Authority Bill 1973, which was included despite some uncertainty as to whether the provisions of Section 57 had been met. This established a statutory body to control the exploration for, and development of, petroleum and mining resources.

All six bills were affirmed by an absolute majority of the total number of members and senators, a requirement under the Constitution for the bills to pass. All proceedings of the joint sitting were broadcast on radio and television by the Australian Broadcasting Commission and a complete sound record was made for archival purposes. This was the first Australian television coverage of parliamentary debates.

== Political background ==
In early 1974, the conservative parties led by Billy Snedden had chosen to use their majority in the Senate to oppose key government legislation. As the Senate had rejected the bills twice, Prime Minister Gough Whitlam advised a double dissolution under section 57 of the Constitution. The Governor-General Sir Paul Hasluck agreed, and on 18 May an election for both houses of parliament was held.

Campaigning for the Labor Party, Whitlam asked the electorate to let him "finish the job" and used the slogan "Give Gough a Go". The Liberal and Country parties focused their campaign on government mismanagement and the state of the economy. The Labor Party was returned with a slightly reduced majority in the House of Representatives and, crucially, still without the Senate majority it required to pass the legislation in question.

The new parliament convened on 9 July. On 11 July, Hasluck's term as Governor-General ended, and Sir John Kerr was sworn in. The legislation was reintroduced, but, as expected, it again failed to pass the Senate. Now, all the constitutional requirements for a joint sitting had been met. At Whitlam's request, on 30 July Kerr issued a proclamation convening the joint sitting.

The coalition parties sought to prevent the joint sitting by challenging its constitutional validity in the High Court. The writs were issued by senator Sir Magnus Cormack (Lib) and Senator Jim Webster (CP) on 1 August. The Queensland government also brought an action, although it sought a narrower declaration. The court delivered a unanimous decision on 5 August 1974 and ruled that the sitting was constitutionally valid.

== The sitting ==
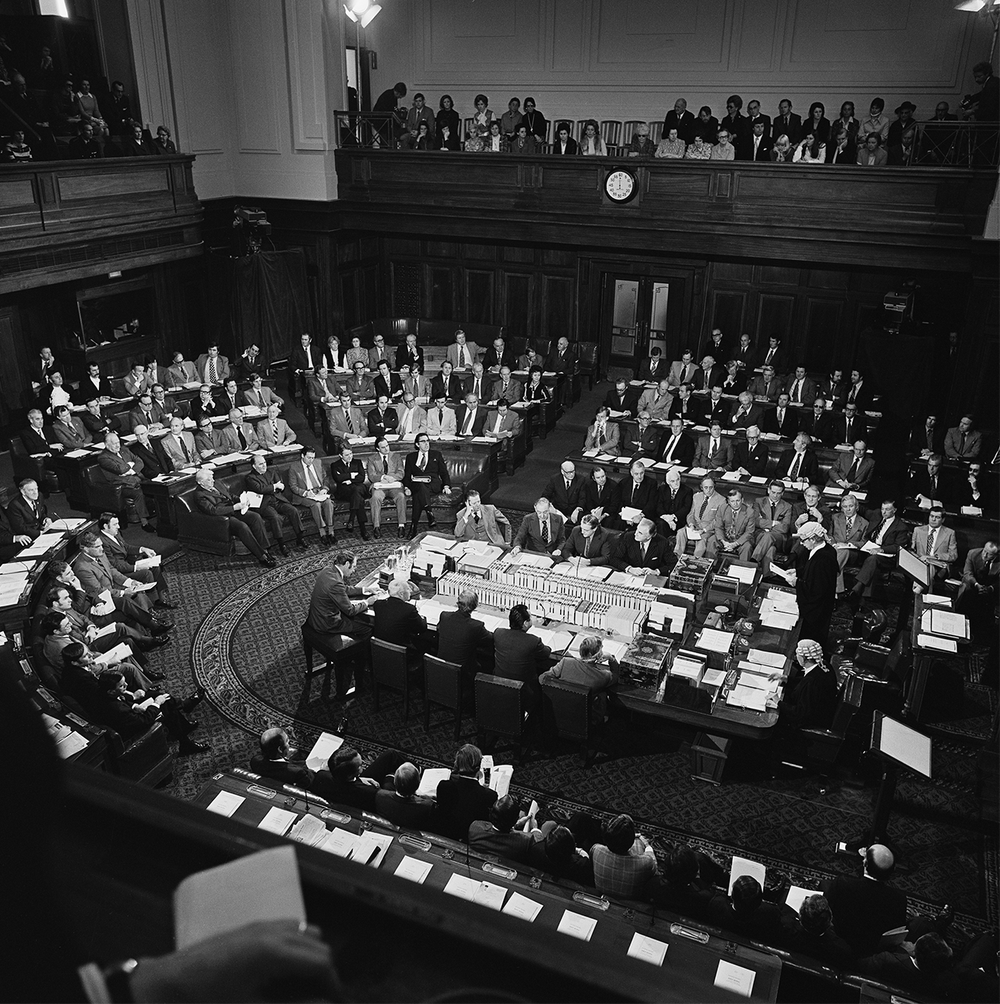
All 187 federal MPs at the 1974 joint sitting

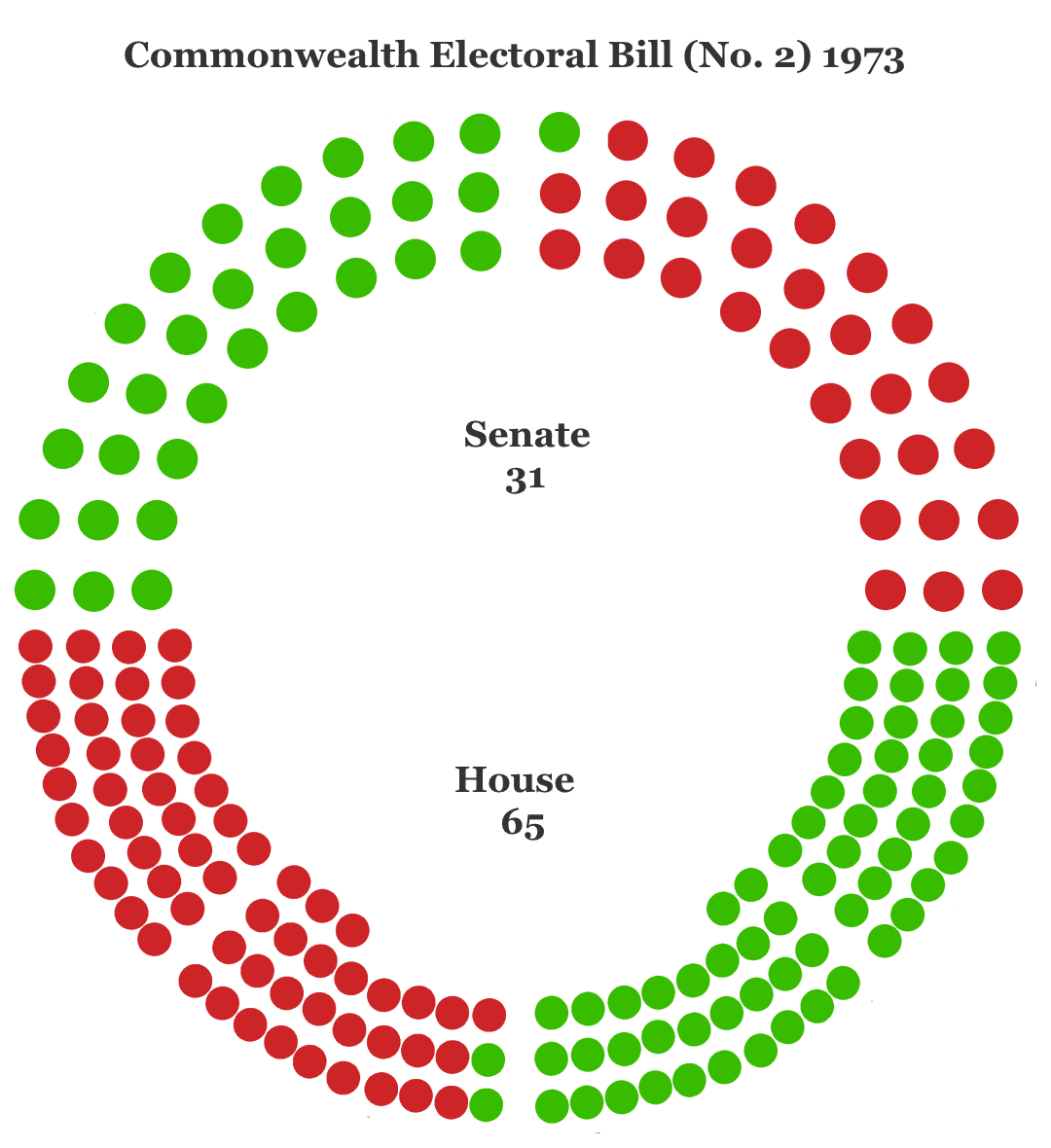
Votes for and against the Commonwealth Electoral Bill (No. 2) 1973

The joint sitting of all 187 members of Parliament (127 from the House of Representatives and 60 from the Senate) was held over two days, on 6 and 7 August 1974. The House of Representatives chamber was chosen as the venue for the sitting, and the event was covered by both radio and television. As well as the lower house holding a bigger seating capacity than the Senate, Whitlam said it was "the people's House, the House where alone governments are made and unmade".

Speaker Jim Cope assumed the chair; his had been the only nomination. Whitlam further commented that "at long last, after sustained stonewalling and filibustering, the parliament can proceed to enact these essential parts of the government's program." Snedden, on the other hand, was more cynical, stating "this is indeed an historic occasion. So many people have described it as such that one is convinced it must be."

Given the importance of the occasion, both sides showed behaviour and restraint. The Coalition continued to oppose the legislation but the Labor majority in the House was such that it had an overall majority in the Parliament, and all the legislation was able to pass easily. A vote of 94 was required, so that if at least 94 of the 95 Labor parliamentarians supported the bills, each would be passed.

Special rules were drafted for the conduct of business. These included the hours of sittings, a 20-minute limit on speeches, and a requirement that there be at least 4 hours of debate (or 12 speakers) before debate on any bill could be ended.

For the most part, the proceedings moved smoothly and all of the bills were approved along party lines.

- Commonwealth Electoral Bill (No. 2) 1973, 96 votes to 91. Liberal Movement Senator Steele Hall supported the three electoral Bills, citing his experience as Liberal Premier of South Australia, where he had fought his own party to improve unequal electoral arrangements known as the Playmander.
- Senate (Representation of Territories) Bill 1973, 97 votes to 90. Northern Territory Country Party member Sam Calder supported the Territory Senators legislation, though he opposed the ACT being given added representation.
- Representation Bill 1973 96 votes to 91.
- Health Insurance Commission Bill 1973 95 votes to 92.
- Health Insurance Bill 1973 95 votes to 92.
- Petroleum and Minerals Authority Bill 1973 95 votes to 91, with Liberal Party member John Gorton absent.

The proceedings concluded at 11 p.m. on 7 August, to mixed reviews. Labor saw it as an 'historic event'; their opponents saw it as 'a waste of time'. On 7 and 8 August 1974, the Governor-General gave Royal Assent to all the bills.

== Subsequent legal challenges ==
Thirteen months later, four state litigants, Victoria, New South Wales, Queensland and Western Australia took legal action against the Commonwealth Government and the Minister for Minerals and Energy Rex Connor, challenging the Petroleum and Minerals Authority Act 1973. The issue was when the Senate had 'failed to pass' the Petroleum and Minerals Authority Bill 1973, whether that was on 13 December 1973 which was the day of the Bill's first reading in the Senate and the last sitting day of 1973, or some time after the resumption of the Senate on 28 February 1974. In separate judgments, the majority of the High Court, Barwick Chief Justice, McTiernan, Gibbs, Stephen and Mason JJ, held that the Senate had not 'failed to pass' the bill on 13 December 1973 and that there had not been an interval of three months between the Senate 'failing to pass' the Bill and 8 April 1974 which was when the House of Representatives again passed the Bill. Because the Bill had not been one of the 'proposed laws' in dispute when the double dissolution was called it could not therefore be voted on by the joint session and was not a valid law of the Commonwealth. In his dissenting judgment Jacobs J concluded that the Senate had failed to pass the Bill on 13 December 1973 because it had adjourned further consideration of the Bill until February 1974. Although the law remains on the statute books as No. 43 of 1974, it was invalidated by the declaration of the High Court.

Western Australia, New South Wales and Queensland also sought to separately challenge the Senate (Representation of Territories) Act 1973, the Commonwealth Electoral Act (No. 2) 1973, and the Representation Act 1973. The primary challenge was that the States alleged that too much time had elapsed from the second rejection of the Bills by the Senate and the double dissolution. In separate judgments, all of the judges Barwick CJ, McTiernan, Gibbs, Stephen, Mason, Jacobs and Murphy JJ, held that once the trigger conditions had been satisfied, the Governor-General could exercise the power at any time prior to 'six months before the date of the expiry of the House of Representatives by effluxion of time'.

== Other proposed joint sittings ==
=== 1987 ===
In 1987, the Hawke government's legislation for an Australia Card was twice rejected by the Senate, before and again after the 1987 double dissolution election. A joint sitting was planned, but the bill was abandoned when it was realised its implementation would still have been subject to the whim of the Senate, which was hostile to the proposal.

=== 2016 ===
Following the 2016 federal election, which was a double dissolution, Prime Minister Malcolm Turnbull said that his government would re-present the bills to reinstate the Australian Building and Construction Commission (ABCC) to a joint sitting of parliament, despite a cabinet minister having declared the bills' prospects as dead because the government did not have the numbers to pass either of the bills, and news media outlets decrying the likelihood of the government having the numbers to pass the relevant pieces of legislation in a joint sitting due to "a Senate that looks even more difficult and unwieldy than before the election and fewer government members in the House of Representatives." However, a joint sitting was made unnecessary when the trigger bills were reintroduced to parliament after the election and all were passed with amendments.

== Bibliography ==
- The 1974 joint sitting of Parliament: Parliamentary Library

== See also ==
- Joint meetings of the Australian Parliament
