= Ewart Smith =

Australian public servant (1920–1991)

- Born: 1920; Sydney
- Died: 10 September 1991 (aged 71)
- Occupations: Public servant and campaigner
- Children: Three

Ewart Smith OBE (1920–1991) was an Australian public servant. He was little known to the public during his working life, but in retirement he played a very significant role in the demise of the Australia Card proposal in 1987.

== Career ==
Ewart Smith was a medallist at the University of Sydney, graduating with first-class honours in Law. On joining the Commonwealth Public Service, his experience was in the Department of External Territories, the Crown Solicitor's Office and legislative drafting both in Australia and Papua New Guinea. He rose to become a Deputy Secretary of the Attorney-General's Department, leaving the role in 1980 to join the Administrative Appeals Tribunal, from which he retired in 1987.

== Australia Card ==
After its re-election in the 1984 general election, the Labor government of Bob Hawke held a Tax Summit in 1985. The idea of a universal ID card had been raised by certain attendees, and the government decided to implement it. They had the backing of many senior public servants, who had had such an idea in mind for some time. The government introduced a law instituting the Australia Card. The general public seemed little troubled by it, as it was portrayed as a means to stop cheating on tax and welfare payments. However, the Liberal and National parties in opposition were firmly against it, because they believed it could be used for more insidious purposes. They saw it as a threat to civil liberties, and said that it was a threat to privacy and that it was too open to abuse. The Opposition controlled the Senate, and were able to block the legislation after it had passed the House of Representatives. When the proposal was reintroduced and blocked a second time, Hawke was in a position to seek a double dissolution from the Governor-General, Sir Ninian Stephen under Section 57 of the Constitution. This was granted on 5 June 1987, and the general election for the entire parliament was held on 11 July. The Australia Card played little part in the election campaign, but on election night, in claiming victory, Hawke said its reintroduction would be the new government's highest priority.

However, Labor still lacked a majority in the Senate. Undaunted, Hawke pushed ahead with the proposal. The Constitution provides that where a double dissolution has taken place, the relevant bills may be reintroduced a third time, and if they are defeated a third time, the governor-general may agree to hold a joint sitting, which Labor would control numerically due to having won a large majority in the House. Despite the obstacles it had faced until this point, the passage of the Australia Card Bill now seemed ultimately assured. It was introduced for a third time to the House of Representatives, where it was passed on 16 September. It was introduced to the Senate the following day, and debated on 18, 21 and 23 September.

At this time Ewart Smith realised the government's plan had a previously unnoticed flaw. The Australia Card Bill contained clauses that imposed penalties on businesses that failed to require a person to produce their Australia Card, or authorised the freezing of bank account and social security payments for those who did not produce one. These clauses were deemed to come into effect on "the first relevant day", and that in turn was determined by a regulation made under the Act. However, regulations require the concurrence of the Senate alone, and the Opposition-controlled Senate remained resolutely opposed to the Bill ever becoming law.

Smith conveyed this reality in two letters to newspaper editors. These were read by John Stone, a former Secretary of the Treasury who had resigned to enter politics and was elected at the July 1987 election as a National Party Senator for Queensland. Stone contacted Smith to confirm the details, advised his parliamentary colleagues, and the government was embarrassed on 23 September 1987 when asked questions in parliament that revealed they were not aware of this development.

It now became irrelevant that the Bill would be passed by a joint sitting, because the Opposition would use its numbers in the Senate to indefinitely delay its practical implementation. Although the government could have sought to force the issue by having certain matters tested in the High Court, public opinion had now come into play, and it was also decidedly against the idea of identification cards. There were what Michael Kirby characterised as "unprecedented demonstrations of popular opposition", with rallies all over the country, and newspapers and talk-back radio inundated with anti-Australia Card sentiment. Graham Greenleaf, writing in The Computer Law and Security Report, Vol 3 No 6, March/April 1988, wrote "There has never been a debate like it in the letters page; there has never been such a cry of opposition from the nation over one topic…". There was a greater number of signatories on various petitions to parliament against the Australia Card than on any previous series of related parliamentary petitions. Under these circumstances, Hawke chose not to proceed with his plan to hold a joint sitting, and the Australia Card Bill was abandoned.

== Later life ==
In 1988 the Hawke government introduced four proposals to amend the Constitution, one of which was to extend the maximum life of the Parliament from three to four years. Ewart Smith drew attention to a consequence of this: the extension of the maximum term of the [then] current House of Representatives, which became a telling political point for the opponents.

In 1989 Smith published a book titled The Australia Card: The story of its defeat.

Ewart Smith died in 1991, aged 71.

== Honours and legacy ==
In the Queen's Birthday Honours 1976 he was appointed an Officer of the Order of the British Empire for public service.

In 2005 the Australian Privacy Foundation announced the Smith Awards. These are named conjointly after:

- Winston Smith, the protagonist of George Orwell's novel Nineteen Eighty-Four
- the common use of the name Smith as a pseudonym to protect one's anonymity, and
- Ewart Smith.
