= Double dissolution =

Procedure of dissolving both houses of the Australian Parliament

A double dissolution is a procedure permitted under the Australian Constitution to resolve deadlocks in the bicameral Parliament of Australia between the House of Representatives (lower house) and the Senate (upper house). A double dissolution is the only circumstance in which the entire Senate can be dissolved.

Similar to the United States Congress, but unlike the British Parliament, Australia's two parliamentary houses generally have almost equal legislative power (the Senate may reject outright but cannot amend appropriation (money) bills, which must originate in the House of Representatives). Governments, which are formed in the House of Representatives, can be frustrated by a Senate determined to reject their legislation.

If the conditions (called a trigger) are satisfied, the prime minister can advise the governor-general to dissolve both houses of Parliament and call a full election. If, after the election, the legislation that triggered the double dissolution is still not passed by the two houses, then a joint sitting of the two houses of parliament can be called to vote on the legislation. If the legislation is passed by the joint sitting, it is deemed to have passed both the House of Representatives and the Senate. The 1974 joint sitting remains the only occurrence in federal Australian history.

Historically, a double dissolution election has been called in lieu of an early election, with the formal trigger bill not playing a significant role during the subsequent election campaign.

There are also similar double dissolution provisions in the South Australian state constitution.

== Constitutional basis ==
Part of section 57 of the Constitution provides:

If the House of Representatives passes any proposed law, and the Senate rejects or fails to pass it, or passes it with amendments to which the House of Representatives will not agree, and if after an interval of three months the House of Representatives, in the same or the next session, again passes the proposed law with or without any amendments which have been made, suggested, or agreed to by the Senate, and the Senate rejects or fails to pass it, or passes it with amendments to which the House of Representatives will not agree, the Governor-General may dissolve the Senate and the House of Representatives simultaneously. But such dissolution shall not take place within six months before the date of the expiry of the House of Representatives by effluxion of time.

Section 57 also provides that, following the election, if the Senate a third time rejects the bill or bills that were the subject of the double dissolution, the Governor-General may convene a joint sitting of the two houses to consider the bill or bills, including any amendments which have been previously proposed in either house, or any new amendments. If a bill is passed by an absolute majority of the total membership of the joint sitting, it is treated as though it had been passed separately by both houses, and is presented for royal assent. The only time this procedure was invoked was in the 1974 joint sitting.

== Trigger event ==
The double dissolution provision comes into play if the Senate and House twice fail to agree on a piece of legislation (in section 57 called a "proposed law", and commonly referred to as a "trigger"). When one or more such triggers exist, the Governor-General may dissolve both the House and Senate – pursuant to section 57 of the Constitution – and issue writs for an election in which every seat in the Parliament is contested.

The conditions stipulated by section 57 of the Constitution are:

- The trigger bill originated in the House of Representatives.
- Three months elapsed between the two rejections of the bill by the Senate ("rejection" in this context can extend to the Senate's failure to pass the bill, or to the Senate passing it with amendments to which the House of Representatives will not agree).
- The second rejection occurred in the same session as the first, or the subsequent session, but no later.

There is no similar provision for resolving deadlocks with respect to bills that have originated in the Senate and are blocked in the House of Representatives.

Though the Constitution refers to possible actions by the Governor-General, it had long been presumed that convention required the Governor-General to act only on the advice of the Prime Minister and the Cabinet. However, as the 1975 constitutional crisis demonstrated, the Governor-General is not compelled to follow the Prime Minister's advice. In these cases, he or she must be personally satisfied that the conditions specified in the Constitution apply, and is entitled to seek additional information or advice before coming to a decision.

== Practice and misconceptions ==
As a High Court Chief Justice Barwick observed in a unanimous decision in Cormack v Cope (Joint Sittings Case) (1974) (with emphasis added):

8. When the two Houses have so far disagreed, the proposed law passed by the House of Representatives having been twice rejected by the Senate (throughout these reasons I shall include in the word "reject" or "rejection" the failure to pass or a passage with amendments unacceptable to the House of Representatives), an appropriate period of time having elapsed between the first rejection and its second passage by the House of Representatives, the Governor-General is empowered to dissolve both Houses at the same time. The power given by s. 5 of the Constitution is only a power to dissolve the House of Representatives. The dissolution of the Senate can only be effected by action pursuant to s. 57. The basis of this power of dissolving the Senate along with the House of Representatives is described in the first paragraph of s. 57. It seems to have been thought that, when exercising this power, the Governor-General dissolves both Houses in respect of or in relation to some specific proposed law which has thus been twice rejected by the Senate in accordance with the prescription of the first paragraph of s. 57. But this, to my mind, is a basic misconception. Whilst it is true that there must have been in fact the required rejection of a proposed law by the Senate before the Governor-General may lawfully dissolve both Houses he does not dissolve the Houses in relation to or in respect of any particular law. He merely dissolves the Houses. (at p. 450)
9. The means by which the Governor-General makes known his act of dissolution is by a proclamation. It seems that such a proclamation customarily contains a recital to the effect that some specific proposed law, or on this occasion specific proposed laws, has or have been rejected as required by s. 57. But, in my opinion, such a recital referring to a specific proposed law is quite unnecessary. Indeed, it may be apt to be misleading. In the first place, it is not given to the Governor-General to decide whether or not in fact the occasion for the exercise of the power of double dissolution has arisen. In my opinion, only this Court may decide that fact if it comes into question. But of course, the Governor-General must make up his own mind whether the occasion has arisen for him to exercise his power of double dissolution and he may recite that it has. But what he determines for himself is in no wise binding. To recite that a specific proposed law or specific proposed laws has or have in fact satisfied the prescription of s. 57 may tend to give the impression that the Governor-General is deciding that matter of fact. Secondly, such a recital tends to give support to what I consider the misconception that the dissolution is in respect of or in relation to a specific proposed law or specific proposed laws. (at p. 450)

== History ==
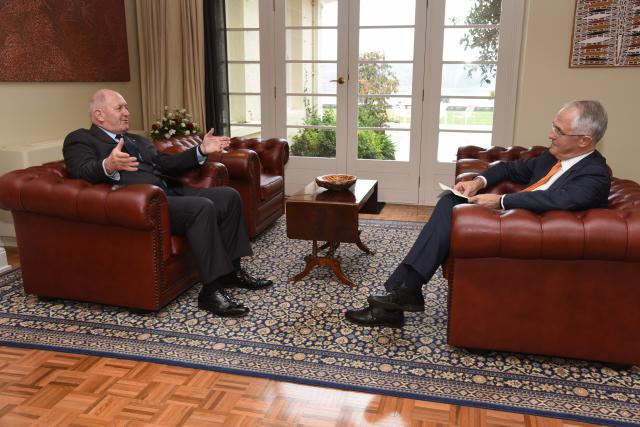
Prime Minister Malcolm Turnbull visits Governor-General Sir Peter Cosgrove on 8 May 2016 to request a double dissolution

There have been seven double dissolutions: in 1914, 1951, 1974, 1975, 1983, 1987 and 2016. However, a joint sitting following a double dissolution pursuant to section 57 has only taken place once, in 1974. (Note: Joint sittings sometimes occur under different circumstances that have nothing to do with S. 57. For example, see Casual Senate vacancies in the representation of the territories. Also, the Parliament met in secret joint session on some occasions during World War II; and joint sittings were convened to receive an address by a visiting head of state or government prior to 2006. For comprehensive details, see Joint meetings of the Australian Parliament.)

- In 1914, the Joseph Cook Commonwealth Liberal Party sought to abolish preferential employment for trade union members in the public service, resulting in a double dissolution on 30 July 1914. In the election on 5 September 1914 the government was defeated by the opposition, Andrew Fisher's Australian Labor Party, and the bill was not pursued.
- In 1951, the Robert Menzies Liberal–Country Party coalition government sought to reverse the proposed nationalisation of the banks put in place by the Australian Labor Party government led by Ben Chifley. The repeal was opposed by the Labor Party in the Senate. Parliament was dissolved on 19 March 1951. In the election on 28 April 1951, the government was returned with a reduced majority in the lower house, but now with a majority in the Senate. The Commonwealth Bank Bill was presented to Parliament again on 26 June 1951 and passed both houses.
- In 1974, the Gough Whitlam Labor government was unable to pass a large number of bills through a hostile Senate. The government had announced a half-Senate election, but in the wake of the Gair affair, Whitlam decided to call a double dissolution on 11 April 1974, citing six bills as triggers. (Note: The six bills were: Commonwealth Electoral Bill (No. 2) 1973; Senate (Representation of Territories) Bill 1973; Representation Bill 1973; Health Insurance Bill 1973; Health Insurance Commission Bill 1973; Petroleum and Minerals Authority Bill 1973.) The bills included representation of the territories and for the setting up of Medibank. At the election of 18 May 1974, the government was returned, but still without a majority in the Senate. Sir Paul Hasluck's term as Governor-General ended on 11 July and the new Governor-General Sir John Kerr took office. The trigger bills were reintroduced and again rejected by the Senate and on 30 July Kerr approved Whitlam's request for a joint sitting. The coalition parties applied to the High Court on 1 August to prevent the joint sitting. One of the grounds was that the dissolution writs did not set out which "proposed laws" were the subject of the dissolution and that only one bill could be dealt with at a joint sitting. The court delivered a unanimous decision on 5 August 1974 and ruled that the sitting was constitutionally valid, that the joint sitting may deal with any number of trigger bills, and that provided the circumstances set out in section 57 had been satisfied then the Governor-General need not specify which "proposed laws" were to be the subject of a future joint sitting. The joint sitting took place on 6–7 August 1974, and it passed the 6 trigger bills. Thirteen months later, four states challenged the validity of various laws passed in the joints sitting. The High Court upheld the validity of the Senate (Representation of Territories) Act 1973, the Commonwealth Electoral Act (No. 2) 1973, and the Representation Act 1973. The Petroleum and Minerals Authority Act 1973 was challenged on the grounds that there had not been the required 3 month gap between the Senate's first and second rejections of that Act. The High Court ruled that the Act was not eligible for the double dissolution process, as the Senate had not had sufficient time to "fail to pass" it.
- In 1975, the Whitlam government was again frustrated by a hostile Senate. The government had accumulated a total of 21 trigger bills, (Note: The 21 bills were: Health Insurance Levy Bill 1974; Health Insurance Levy Assessment Bill 1974; Income Tax (International Agreements) Bill 1974; Minerals (Submerged Lands) Bill 1974; Minerals (Submerged Lands) (Royalty) Bill 1974; National Health Bill 1974; Conciliation and Arbitration Bill 1974; Conciliation and Arbitration Bill (No. 2) 1974; National Investment Fund Bill 1974; Electoral Laws Amendment Bill 1974; Electoral Bill 1975; Privy Council Appeals Abolition Bill 1975; Superior Court of Australia Bill 1974; Electoral Re-distribution (New South Wales) Bill 1975; Electoral Re-distribution (Queensland) Bill 1975; Electoral Re-distribution (South Australia) Bill 1975; Electoral Re-distribution (Tasmania) Bill 1975; Electoral Re-distribution (Victoria) Bill 1975; Broadcasting and Television Bill (No. 2) 1974; Television Stations Licence Fees Bill 1974; Broadcasting Stations Licence Fees Bill 1974.) but did not call for a double dissolution. However, the Whitlam government was unable to obtain passage of appropriation bills through the hostile Senate, leading to the 1975 Australian constitutional crisis. On 11 November 1975, in an attempt to break the deadlock, Whitlam intended to call a half-Senate election, but instead was dismissed by the Governor-General, Sir John Kerr, who then appointed Malcolm Fraser, the Leader of the Liberal-Country coalition Opposition, caretaker Prime Minister. The Fraser minority government immediately passed the Supply bills through the Senate before losing a no-confidence motion in the House of Representatives. Kerr then dissolved both houses of Parliament on the advice of the new Prime Minister citing the trigger bills, even though Fraser had opposed the bills. Fraser remained the caretaker Prime Minister during the election campaign. In the election on 13 December 1975 the Fraser government was elected with a majority in both houses and the trigger bills were not brought up after the election.
- On 3 February 1983, Malcolm Fraser called a double dissolution, citing 13 trigger bills. (Note: The 13 bills were: 9 Sales Tax Amendment Bills: No. 1 (Cth), No. 2 (Cth), No. 3 (Cth), No. 4 (Cth), No. 5 (Cth) ,No. 6 (Cth), No. 7 (Cth), No. 8 (Cth), No. 9 (Cth) 1981; Canberra College of Advanced Education Bill (Cth); States Grants (Tertiary Education Assistance) Amendment Bill (No. 2) (Cth); Australian National University Amendment Bill (No. 3) (Cth); Social Services Amendment Bill (No. 3) 1981 (Cth)) When Fraser called the election, he expected he would be facing Bill Hayden as the alternative prime minister. But unbeknown to Fraser, Labor had changed leadership from Hayden to Bob Hawke earlier that same morning. The Fraser coalition government was defeated by the Labor Opposition led by Hawke at the election on 5 March 1983, and the bills lapsed. Fraser is the only prime minister to have advised two double dissolutions (1975 and 1983).
- On 5 June 1987, Bob Hawke called a double dissolution after the rejection of the Australia Card Bill 1986. The government was returned at the election of 11 July 1987, but still without a Senate majority. The bill was reintroduced in September 1987, and a vote in the Senate was planned for 7 October. A retired public servant, Ewart Smith, said that the Australia Card Bill was unworkable because the implementation date would have needed to be the subject of a regulation, which would have required the concurrence of the Senate alone, which was hostile to the legislation. Even if the bill had been passed by the parliament at a joint sitting, the Opposition could still have prevented it from being implemented as long as it held a majority in the Senate. In these circumstances, Hawke decided to abandon the bill. Sir Ninian Stephen is the only Governor-General to have approved two double dissolutions (1983 and 1987).
- On 8 May 2016, Malcolm Turnbull called a double dissolution election for 2 July 2016, citing three of the four available trigger bills. (Note: The three cited bills were: Building and Construction Industry (Improving Productivity) Bill 2013 (Cth); Building and Construction Industry (Consequential and Transitional Provisions) Bill 2013 (Cth); Fair Work (Registered Organisations) Amendment Bill 2014 (Cth)) The trigger bills were reintroduced to parliament after the election and all were passed with amendments.

=== Summary ===
The following table is a summary of the relevant details:

Election	Trigger(s)	Governor-General	Prime Minister	Leader of the Opposition	Result	Bills subsequently passed	Relevant bills, circumstances and outcome
1914	Government Preference Prohibition Bill 1913	Sir Ronald Munro Ferguson	Joseph Cook	Andrew Fisher	Government defeated	No	The Cook government was defeated and the bill lapsed.
1951	Commonwealth Bank Bill 1950 [No. 2]	Sir William McKell	Robert Menzies	Ben Chifley	Government re-elected	Yes	The Menzies government was returned with a reduced majority in the lower house, but now with a majority in the Senate. The bill was presented to Parliament again and passed both houses.
1974	Six bills	Sir Paul Hasluck	Gough Whitlam	Billy Snedden	Government re-elected	Joint sitting	The Whitlam government was returned, but still without a majority in the Senate. The bills were reintroduced and again rejected by the Senate. A joint sitting took place, where all the bills were passed. Subsequently, the High Court ruled that the Petroleum and Minerals Authority Bill had not been eligible for the double dissolution process, as the Senate had not had sufficient time to "fail to pass" it.
1975	21 bills	Sir John Kerr	Malcolm Fraser (caretaker)	Gough Whitlam	Government elected	No	Culmination of the 1975 constitutional crisis. Fraser had opposed the bills as Leader of the Liberal-Country coalition Opposition. He had been appointed caretaker Prime Minister when the Whitlam government was dismissed by Sir John Kerr after being unable to obtain passage of its appropriation bills. The Fraser minority government immediately lost a no-confidence motion in the lower house; but Kerr dissolved the Parliament on Fraser's advice (a condition of his appointment). Fraser remained the caretaker Prime Minister during the election campaign. On 13 December the Fraser government was elected in its own right, with a record majority.
1983	13 bills	Sir Ninian Stephen	Malcolm Fraser	Bob Hawke	Government defeated	No	The Fraser coalition government was defeated at the election, and the bills lapsed.
1987	Australia Card Bill 1986	Sir Ninian Stephen	Bob Hawke	John Howard	Government re-elected	No	The Hawke government was returned, but the bill was abandoned after the election.
2016	Three bills	Sir Peter Cosgrove	Malcolm Turnbull	Bill Shorten	Government re-elected	Yes	The Turnbull government was returned at the election, with a reduced and very narrow majority. All three bills passed with amendments after debate in the new parliament.

== Elections ==
A double dissolution affects the outcome of elections for houses of parliament using proportional representation over multiple elections, such as the proportional voting system for the Senate where each state normally only elects half its Senate delegation, but following a double dissolution, each state elects its entire senate delegation. The outcome is affected in two ways:

1. the quota for a seat is lower making it easier for smaller parties to win seats; and
2. Senators need to be allocated long-term and short-term seats.

Neither of these issues arise in relation to the two territories represented in the Senate as each elects its two senators to a term ending at the dissolution of the House of Representatives.

=== Quota ===
Under proportional representation, the more seats there are, the easier it is for smaller parties to win seats. A double dissolution increases the number of available seats because all seats are contested in the same election. The following calculations refer to the current arrangements of 12 senate seats per state since 1984, however the calculations are similar for the period from 1949 until 1983 when there were 10 senate seats per state. The quota for the election of each senator in each Australian state in a full senate election is 7.69% ($\dfrac{1}{12+1}$), while in a normal half-Senate election the quota is 14.28% ($\dfrac{1}{6+1}$).

While the threshold is lower for smaller parties, for more significant parties the distribution of candidates' votes as they are eliminated has a rounding effect. A double dissolution favours parties that have a vote significantly greater than a multiple of the required double dissolution vote and greater than a multiple of the normal quota. It disadvantages those that do not. For example, a party achieving 10% of the vote is likely to get one candidate out of six elected in a regular election (as minor parties' votes are distributed until they get to 14.28%) but the same party with the same vote is likely to have one candidate out of 12 elected during a double dissolution election (as their second candidate will be left with 2.31% and be excluded early in the count). A party with 25% is likely to achieve three candidates out of 12 during a double dissolution election (three candidates and 1.83% of the vote for their 4th candidate distributed to other candidates) and two out of six in a regular election (one candidate taking 14.28% and the second holding 10.72% remains standing until minor parties' preferences push the second candidate to a quota).

Since the abolition of group voting tickets in the lead-up to the 2016 general election, it is no longer possible to create "calculators" that assess the senate election outcome with reasonable accuracy. Antony Green's working guide is that "if a party has more than 0.5 of a quota, it will be in the race for one of the final seats". His calculation of the percentage of primary-vote required for the first six full- and half-quotas at a double dissolution election are as follows:

Senate Quotas Ready Reckoner
Quotas	% vote	Quotas	% vote
0.5	3.8	1	7.7
1.5	11.5	2	15.4
2.5	19.2	3	23.1
3.5	26.9	4	30.8
4.5	34.6	5	38.5
5.5	42.3	6	46.2

Unlike the case of a normal half-Senate election, the newly elected Senate, like the House, takes office immediately. The Senate cycle is altered, with the next change of Senate membership scheduled for the third date that falls on 1 July after the election. The senators from each state are divided into two classes: the first class receive three-year terms and the second class receive six-year terms (both of these may be interrupted by another double dissolution). Thus for the Parliament elected in the March 1983 double dissolution election, the next two Senate changeovers would have been due on 1 July 1985 and 1 July 1988, while the term of the new House of Representatives would have expired in 1986. Bob Hawke decided to call a regular federal election for December 1984 after only 18 months in office, to bring the two election cycles back into synchronisation.

Examples of seat allocations
Normal six-seat Senate election Quota 14.28% of votes		Double dissolution 12-seat Senate election Quota 7.69% of votes	
Party X (10% votes)	Party Y (25% votes)	Party X (10% votes)	Party Y (25% votes)
One seat (assuming 4.28% in preferences received)	Two seats (assuming 3.56% in preferences received)	One seat (remaining 2.31% distributed)	Three seats (remaining 1.93% distributed)
One sixth of the seats (16.67% of seats)	One third of the seats (33.33% of seats)	One twelfth of the seats (8.33% of seats)	One quarter of the seats (25.00% of seats)

=== Allocation of long-term and short-term seats ===
In order to return to the normal arrangement of half the state Senators being contested at each election, following a double dissolution, section 13 of the Australian Constitution requires the senate to divide the state senators into two classes, with three-year and six-year terms. This has traditionally been done by allocating long terms to the senators elected earliest in the count. The 1984 amendments to the Commonwealth Electoral Act required the Australian Electoral Commission to conduct a notional recount as if only half the seats were to be elected, which was seen as producing a fairer allocation. This alternative allocation has not yet been used. Following double dissolution elections in 1987 and 2016, the order-elected method continued to be used, despite Senate resolutions in 1998 and 2010 agreeing to use the new method.

== South Australian double dissolutions ==
Under section 41 of the South Australian constitution, if a bill is passed by the House of Assembly during a session of Parliament and in the following Parliament after a general election for the lower house is rejected by the Legislative Council on both occasions, it is permitted for the Governor of South Australia to either issue a writ for the election of 2 additional members of the Legislative Council or to dissolve both houses at the same time to elect an entirely new Parliament. As the upper house consists of 22 members, with 11 elected statewide at each general election for an 8-year term at a quota of 8.33%, this would result in an election for all 22 members at a quota of 4.35%.

Although it has been threatened, this South Australian double dissolution procedure has never been used.

== See also ==
- Electoral system of Australia
