= Australia Card =

Australian identification card proposal

The Australia Card was a proposal for a national identification card for Australian citizens and resident foreigners. The proposal was made in 1985, and abandoned in 1987.

== History ==
The idea for the card was raised at the national Tax Summit in 1985 convened by the Australian Government led by Bob Hawke. The card was to amalgamate other government identification systems and act against tax avoidance, and health and welfare fraud. The government introduced legislation in the parliament in 1986, but it did not have a majority in the senate and was repeatedly blocked by the opposition and minor parties. Due to his opposition to the card, Australian Labor Party (ALP) senator George Georges resigned from the party to sit as an independent in December 1986. In the House of Representatives, ALP backbencher Lewis Kent said the card was un-Australian and that it would be more appropriate to call it a "Hitlercard or Stalincard".

In response, Hawke asked the Governor-General, Ninian Stephen, for a double dissolution, which was granted on 5 June 1987, followed by an election on 11 July. The government was returned, but still without a majority in the Senate. Nevertheless, the legislation was reintroduced, even though it was expected to be blocked in the Senate once more. Under such circumstances, a joint sitting of the Senate and the House of Representatives could have taken place. Due to Labor winning a large majority in the House, its numbers in the overall parliament were enough that the bill would have likely passed.

However, a retired public servant, Ewart Smith, noticed a flaw in the drafting of the legislation that nobody on either side had previously noticed. Even if the bill had been passed in the joint sitting, certain regulations necessary for the functioning of the system could be overturned by the Senate alone. Specifically, the bill contained clauses that imposed penalties on businesses that failed to require a person to produce their Australia Card, or authorised the freezing of bank account and social security payments for those who did not produce one. These clauses were deemed to come into effect on "the first relevant day", and that in turn was determined by a regulation made under the Act. However, new regulations can be disallowed [vetoed] by either House (the Senate or House of Representatives) unilaterally, and Senate disallowance cannot be bypassed via a joint sitting. Therefore, even if the bill finally passed, the Coalition could still effectively prevent it from ever being implemented by using its numbers in the Senate to defeat the required regulation. Smith conveyed these details in letters to newspapers; John Stone, recently elected as a National Party senator for Queensland, read the letters and contacted Smith to confirm the details. Stone then told his Opposition colleagues, who were able to embarrass the government on 23 September by asking questions in Parliament that revealed they were not aware of this technicality.

It is not clear that this flaw was fatal to the scheme, but the government did at that point abandon the idea. It may well have been a convenient face-saving way out of the situation, because by that time very significant popular opposition had arisen from widely disparate groups, although the Australia Card had not figured particularly prominently in the election campaign.

== Subsequent outcomes ==
Following the shelving of the Australia Card, the federal government expanded the tax file number scheme to enable cross-referencing benefits received and tax paid by individuals. This unique number is in many ways analogous to the United States social security number.

The Australia Card proposal resurfaces every so often, and the criticism of the card is sometimes invoked for analogous controversial plans. In the early 2000s, figures within the Liberal Party of Australia – which opposed the card in the 1980s – voiced support for a national identity card. Following the London Bombings of 2005, then-Prime Minister John Howard said the Australia Card would help the government combat terrorism and address flaws in the immigration system. This is despite the fact that Howard was Opposition Leader in 1987 when he had the Australia Card legislation blocked in the Senate which triggered the election that year.

Plans to expand the capabilities of the ubiquitous Medicare card were announced in 2006 by then Human Services Minister Joe Hockey. The proposed Access Card was criticised by some relevant interest groups and political activists as a step in the same direction of an Australia Card. However, the Howard government was unable to implement the scheme before their electoral defeat in 2007.

Technology demands for online identification continue to put pressure on the Federal Government to provide a national identity system. The Financial System Inquiry found that there would be significant savings from such a system. However, the inquiry cited the Australia Card history as continuing to provide a barrier to this development:

Many Australians may object to this option on the basis of privacy concerns. It could be viewed as a digital version of the unpopular Australia Card initiative, which was rejected in 1987, or the Access Card, which was terminated in 2007.
