= Joint meetings of the Parliament of Australia =

A joint meeting of the Australian Parliament is a convening of members of the Senate and House of Representatives sitting together as a single legislative body. The Australian Parliament has two bicameral houses: the Senate and the House of Representatives. Subject to the Constitution of Australia, each house has its own rules, standing orders and procedures; its own presiding officer; and meets separately, at dates and times it alone decides. However, there are some occasions when the two Houses have come together as a single body. Typically, the Speaker of the House of Representatives presides over the joint meetings. If the Governor-General attends the meetings, they could preside instead of the Speaker of the House.

== Reasons for joint meetings ==
The reasons for joint meetings have included:

- to resolve deadlocks between the Houses following a double dissolution
- to fill casual vacancies in the representation of the territories in the Senate
- a special commemorative joint sitting to celebrate the Centenary of Federation
- secret meetings to discuss security-related issues, such as Australia's participation in war
- to receive addresses by invited guests such as visiting foreign heads of state or government.

=== Resolving deadlocks between the two Houses ===
The Constitution makes provision for a joint sitting as part of a procedure to resolve legislative deadlocks between the House of Representatives and the Senate. Section 57 provides that, under certain circumstances where there is a deadlock over a bill, both houses may be dissolved in a double dissolution. This is followed by a general election, and the bill may be put to the separate Houses of the newly elected parliament for reconsideration. If this still fails to resolve the deadlock, the bill may be considered by a joint sitting, convened as a single legislative body. If passed by the joint sitting, the bill will be treated for all purposes as if it had been separately passed by the two Houses.

The only time such a joint sitting has occurred was on 6–7 August 1974.

=== Casual vacancies in the representation of the Territories in the Senate ===
Between 1980 and 1989 when the Australian Capital Territory (ACT) gained self-government, the choice of a replacement ACT senator to fill a casual vacancy was made by a joint sitting of both Houses. This occurred twice:

- Margaret Reid was elected on 5 May 1981 to replace the deceased ACT Senator John Knight
- Bob McMullan was elected on 16 February 1988 to replace former ACT Senator Susan Ryan, who had resigned.

Casual vacancies for ACT senators are now filled by the ACT Legislative Assembly, under Section 44 of the Commonwealth Electoral Act 1918.

A joint sitting of the federal parliament would still be used to fill a casual vacancy in the representation of any external territory, in the event that such a territory ever gains separate Senate representation.

=== Special commemorative joint sitting ===
On 9 May 2001, the Parliament met in a special joint sitting at the site of the 1st Parliament, the Royal Exhibition Building in Melbourne, to commemorate the Centenary of that event specifically, and the Centenary of Federation more generally. The joint sitting was addressed by the Governor-General, Sir William Deane.

=== Secret meetings ===
During World War II, the Parliament met in secret on a number of occasions, to hear confidential reports on the progress of the war. There is no Hansard record of the proceedings.

Both Houses met in secret joint sittings on 20 February 1942, 3 September 1942, and 8 October 1942.

The House of Representatives met in secret on 13 December 1940, 29 May 1941, and 20 August 1941.

General Douglas MacArthur is sometimes reported to have addressed the Parliament during World War II. If he addressed the secret joint sittings, this was not officially recorded. However, General MacArthur was provided with a seat on the floor of the House of Representatives on 26 March 1942, and addressed members of Parliament from outside the chamber later that day.

=== Addresses by invited guests ===
The first address by an invited guest to the Parliament in a formally convened joint sitting of which there was an official record was on 2 January 1992, by the US President, George H. W. Bush. Later addresses to joint sittings included those from US presidents Bill Clinton (1996), George W. Bush (2003), and Barack Obama (2011); and paramount leader of China Hu Jintao (2003). (George W. Bush's and Hu Jintao's addresses occurred on consecutive days in October 2003.)

Subsequently, the Senate Standing Committee on Procedure and the Senate Standing Committee of Privileges both recommended that the practice of formally convening a joint sitting for these purposes be discontinued, as they had no constitutional authority, and there were doubts about the validity of the presiding officer of one house giving instructions to members of the other house. On 2 March 2006, it was agreed that future addresses by invited dignitaries would be to a meeting of the House of Representatives only, but to which the members of the Senate would be invited as guests.

=== List of addresses ===
Date	Speaker	Office	Prime Minister	Chamber	Link to speech	Notes
29 November 1951	Richard Law	Member of the British House of Commons	Robert Menzies	Reps		They were part of a visiting delegation from the United Kingdom House of Commons which presented a Mace to the House of Representatives, as a gift from King George VI to commemorate the 50th anniversary of Federation.
29 November 1951	David Rhys Grenfell	Member of the British House of Commons	Robert Menzies	Reps		They were part of a visiting delegation from the United Kingdom House of Commons which presented a Mace to the House of Representatives, as a gift from King George VI to commemorate the 50th anniversary of Federation.
29 November 1951	Jo Grimond	Member of the British House of Commons, later leader of the British Liberal Party	Robert Menzies	Reps		They were part of a visiting delegation from the United Kingdom House of Commons which presented a Mace to the House of Representatives, as a gift from King George VI to commemorate the 50th anniversary of Federation.
2 January 1992	George H. W. Bush	President of the United States	Paul Keating	Reps		The address had been arranged under Keating's predecessor, Bob Hawke
20 November 1996	Bill Clinton	President of the United States	John Howard	Reps		
23 October 2003	George W. Bush	President of the United States	John Howard	Reps		
24 October 2003	Hu Jintao	General Secretary of the Chinese Communist Party; President of China	John Howard	Reps		
27 March 2006	Tony Blair	Prime Minister of the United Kingdom	John Howard	Reps*		* Formally, this and subsequent addresses were made to the House of Representatives only, to which members of the Senate were invited as guests. Previously, addresses were made to formally convened joint meetings of both Houses.
11 September 2007	Stephen Harper	Prime Minister of Canada	John Howard	Reps		
10 March 2010	Susilo Bambang Yudhoyono	President of Indonesia	Kevin Rudd	Reps		
20 June 2011	John Key	Prime Minister of New Zealand	Julia Gillard	Reps		This reciprocated the address by Julia Gillard to the New Zealand Parliament in February 2011.
17 November 2011	Barack Obama	President of the United States	Julia Gillard	Reps		This reciprocated an earlier address by Julia Gillard to the United States Congress.
8 July 2014	Shinzō Abe	Prime Minister of Japan	Tony Abbott	Reps		
14 November 2014	David Cameron	Prime Minister of the United Kingdom	Tony Abbott	Reps		
17 November 2014	Xi Jinping	General Secretary of the Chinese Communist Party; President of China	Tony Abbott	Reps		
18 November 2014	Narendra Modi	Prime Minister of India	Tony Abbott	Reps		
12 October 2016	Lee Hsien Loong	Prime Minister of Singapore	Malcolm Turnbull	Reps		
10 February 2020	Joko Widodo	President of Indonesia	Scott Morrison	Reps		
31 March 2022	Volodymyr Zelenskyy	President of Ukraine	Scott Morrison	Reps, by videolink		Address during the Russo-Ukrainian War, discussed Australian support, preceded by address from Prime Minister and Leader of the Opposition noting Vladimir Putin as a war criminal and likening him to Adolf Hitler
8 February 2024	James Marape	Prime Minister of Papua New Guinea	Anthony Albanese	Reps		
29 February 2024	Bongbong Marcos	President of the Philippines	Anthony Albanese	Reps		President Marcos is the first Philippine president to deliver a speech to federal parliament.
5 March 2026	Mark Carney	Prime Minister of Canada	Anthony Albanese	Reps		
24 March 2026	Ursula von der Leyen	President of the European Commission	Anthony Albanese	Reps		President von der Leyen is the first European Commission president to deliver a speech to federal parliament. She is also the first woman to deliver a speech to federal parliament

- Source: Australia's Parliament House—more than 25 years in the making! A chronology
