= Timeline of South Australian history =

This is a Timeline of South Australian history.

== Pre 1836 ==
- 18,000 BC: Evidence of flint mining activity and rock art in the Koonalda Cave on the Nullarbor Plain.
- 1627: First recorded European sighting of the South Australian coast.
- 1802: South Australian coastline mapped by Matthew Flinders and Nicolas Baudin.
- 1802 (Circa): Unofficial settlement of Kangaroo Island by sealers.
- 1830: Captain Charles Sturt travels to the mouth of the Murray River in a whale boat.
- 1831: Captain Collet Barker explores the Adelaide Plains and climbs to the summit of Mount Lofty.

== 1800s ==
=== 1830s ===
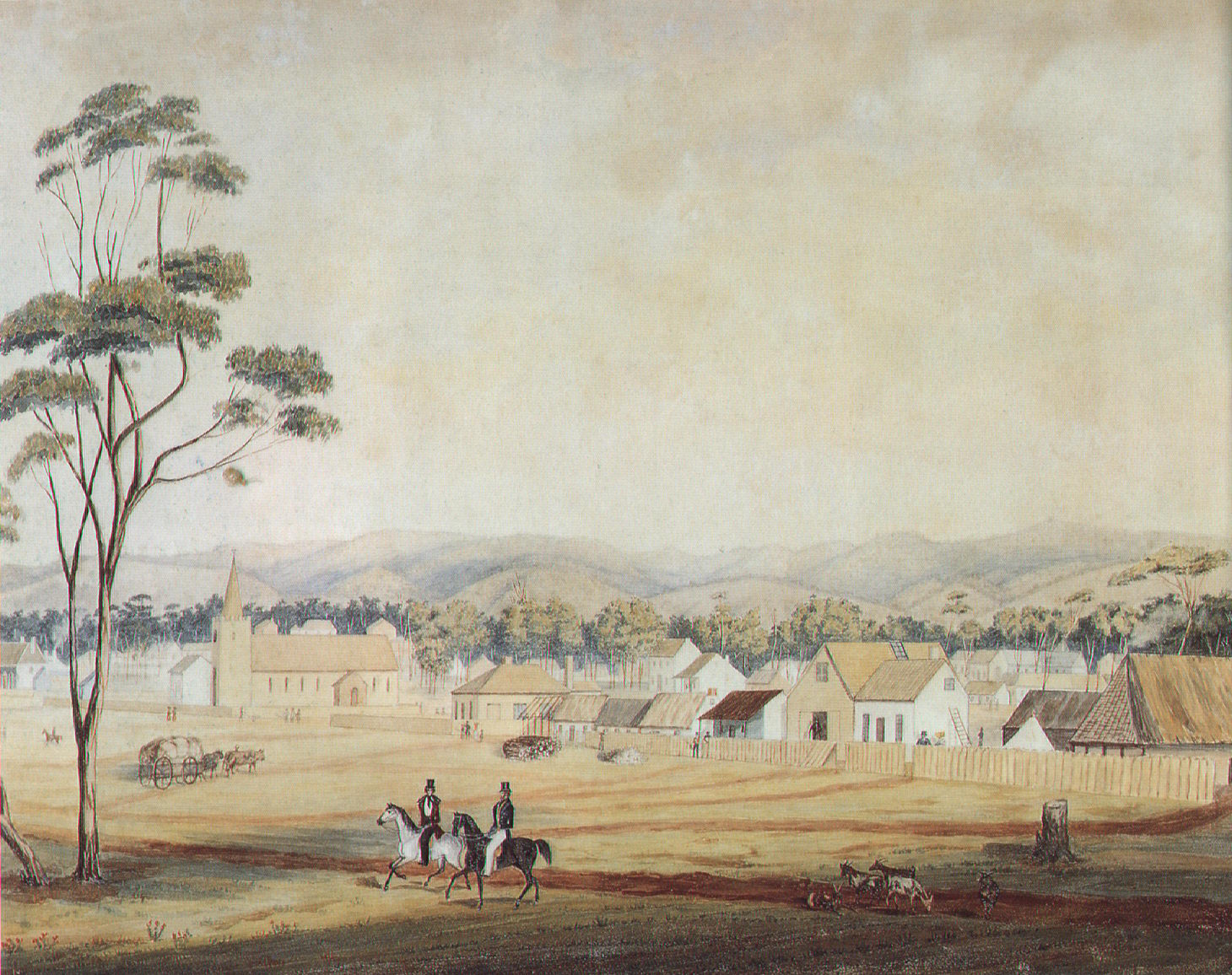
Adelaide in 1839, looking south-east from North Terrace

- 1836: South Australia proclaimed by Governor John Hindmarsh on 28 December at the Old Gum Tree, Glenelg.
- 1836: Site for Adelaide chosen by Colonel William Light beside the River Torrens.
- 1837: Colonel Light completes survey of Adelaide city centre and designs the city's grid layout. Allotments of 1 acre (0.40 ha) are made.
- 1837: First regional settlement, later named Gawler, is founded north of Adelaide.
- 1837: Adelaide's first hospital opens on North Terrace.
- 1838: South Australia Company institutes Special Survey scheme to encourage wealthy pastoralists.
- 1838: The first Australian police force is formed in Adelaide, the South Australia Police.
- 1838: Overlanders Joseph Hawdon and Charles Bonney arrive in Adelaide from New South Wales with 300 head of cattle.
- 1838: First German immigrants arrive and settle in Adelaide and surrounds.
- 1838: Governor George Gawler arrives.
- 1839: Colonel Light dies at Thebarton and is interred in Light Square beneath a memorial. He is the only person buried within "the square mile".
- 1839: The first road in South Australia, Port Road, is opened.
- 1839: Edward John Eyre begins his explorations of the Flinders Ranges and beyond.
- 1839: Gawler township is established.

=== 1840s ===
- 1840: The first portion of Government House is completed, becoming the first in Australia.
- 1840: Royal Adelaide Show held for the first time.
- 1840: The Corporation of Adelaide is founded, the first municipal authority in Australia.
- 1840: Maria wrecked on Coorong and survivors massacred. Gawler orders punitive expedition.
- 1841: Construction of Adelaide Gaol begins.
- 1841: Adelaide Hospital (later Royal) opened.
- 1841: Governor George Grey arrives to replace Gawler.
- 1842: Copper is discovered at Kapunda.
- 1843: The first Legislative Council building opens on North Terrace.
- 1844: The colonial Government takes control of the Corporation of Adelaide.
- 1845: Copper is discovered at Burra.
- 1845: Port Pirie founded on the upper Spencer Gulf.
- 1846: John Ainsworth Horrocks dies while exploring land to the northwest of Lake Torrens.
- 1847: St Peter's College established.
- 1848: Pulteney Grammar School established.

=== 1850s ===
- 1850: The forerunner to Harris Scarfe, G. P. Harris and J. C. Lanyon, opened on Hindley Street.
- 1852: The Corporation of Adelaide is reconstituted. First transport of gold overland arrived in Adelaide.
- 1852: Adelaide Educational Institution opens in Ebenezer Place.
- 1854: The township of Port Augusta at the head of Spencer Gulf is surveyed.
- 1854: The township of Gambierton, later Mount Gambier is founded in the South East.
- 1855: James Macgeorge lays telegraph line between Adelaide and Port Adelaide.
- 1855: Charles Todd, Astronomical and Meteorological Observer, arrives.
- 1856: The South Australian Institute, from which the State Library, State Museum and Art Gallery derived, is founded.
- 1856: Government telegraph line and steam railway between Adelaide and Port Adelaide opened.
- 1856: South Australia becomes one of the first places in the world to enact the Secret Ballot.
- 1857: Adelaide Botanic Garden opened at today's site in the Parklands at the corner of North and East Terraces.
- 1858: Melbourne–Adelaide telegraph line opened.
- 1858: The first edition of The Advertiser newspaper is published.
- 1859: A jetty of more than 350 metres in length is constructed at Glenelg.
- 1859: Shipwreck of SS Admella off Carpenter Rocks in the South East. 89 dead. Worst maritime disaster to this day.

=== 1860s ===
- 1860: Thorndon Park Reservoir supplied water through new reticulation system.
- 1861: East Terrace markets opened.
- 1861: Copper discovered at Moonta, on the Yorke Peninsula.
- 1862: John McDouall Stuart successfully crosses the continent from north to south on his sixth attempt.
- 1863: First gas supplied to city.
- 1864–1867: Great drought
- 1865: Bank of Adelaide founded.
- 1866: Sisters of St Joseph founded by Saint Mary MacKillop in Penola to teach poor rural children.
- 1866: The Italianate Adelaide Town Hall opened.
- 1866: First oil exploration in Australia at Alfred Flat near Salt Creek, along the Coorong.
- 1867: Prince Alfred, Duke of Edinburgh, made first royal visit to Adelaide.
- 1869: The City Market (later Central) opened on Grote Street.
- 1869: Prince Alfred College established.

=== 1870s ===
- 1870: Port Adelaide Football Club established.
- 1871: South Australian Cricket Association is formed.
- 1872: General Post Office opened. Adelaide became first Australian capital linked to Imperial London with completion of the Overland Telegraph.
- 1873: First cricket match played at Adelaide Oval.
- 1874: Adelaide Oval is officially opened.
- 1874: University of Adelaide founded.
- 1874: Iron ore mined and smelted at Mount Jagged, then abandoned.
- 1875: Adelaide Steamship Company founded.
- 1876: Adelaide Children's Hospital founded.
- 1877: The Adelaide Bridge across the River Torrens completed.
- 1877: Copper mines at Burra and Kapunda close.
- 1878: First horse-drawn trams in Australia commence operations in the city.
- 1879: Foundation stone of the University of Adelaide laid.
- 1879: Advanced School for Girls founded; moves to Grote Street in 1881.

=== 1880s ===
- 1880–1886 "seven years' drought"
- 1880: Telephone introduced in South Australia.
- 1880: Fort Glanville opens.
- 1880: Reformatory Hulk Fitzjames commissioned and moored off Largs Bay.
- 1881: The Art Gallery of South Australia opened by Prince Albert Victor.
- 1881: Torrens Lake created following the construction of weir.
- 1881: Coopers Brewery is established.
- 1881: Drought ruins thousands of farmers on marginal land in the Mid North and Goyder's Line is recognised as the limit to agricultural settlement.
- 1882: First water-borne sewerage service in Australia commenced.
- 1882: The City Baths opened on King William Road.
- 1883: Adelaide Zoological Gardens opened.
- 1884: Adelaide Trades and Labor Council inaugurated.
- 1884: Fort Largs opens.
- 1885: The Adelaide Arcade opens.
- 1886: Commercial Bank of South Australia fails in February.
- 1885: Flinders Column erected at the Mount Lofty Summit.
- 1887: The Overland train service between Adelaide and Melbourne commences.
- 1887: Stock Exchange of Adelaide forms.
- 1889: School of Mines and Industries opens on North Terrace.
- 1889: Lead smelters built at Port Pirie.

=== 1890s ===
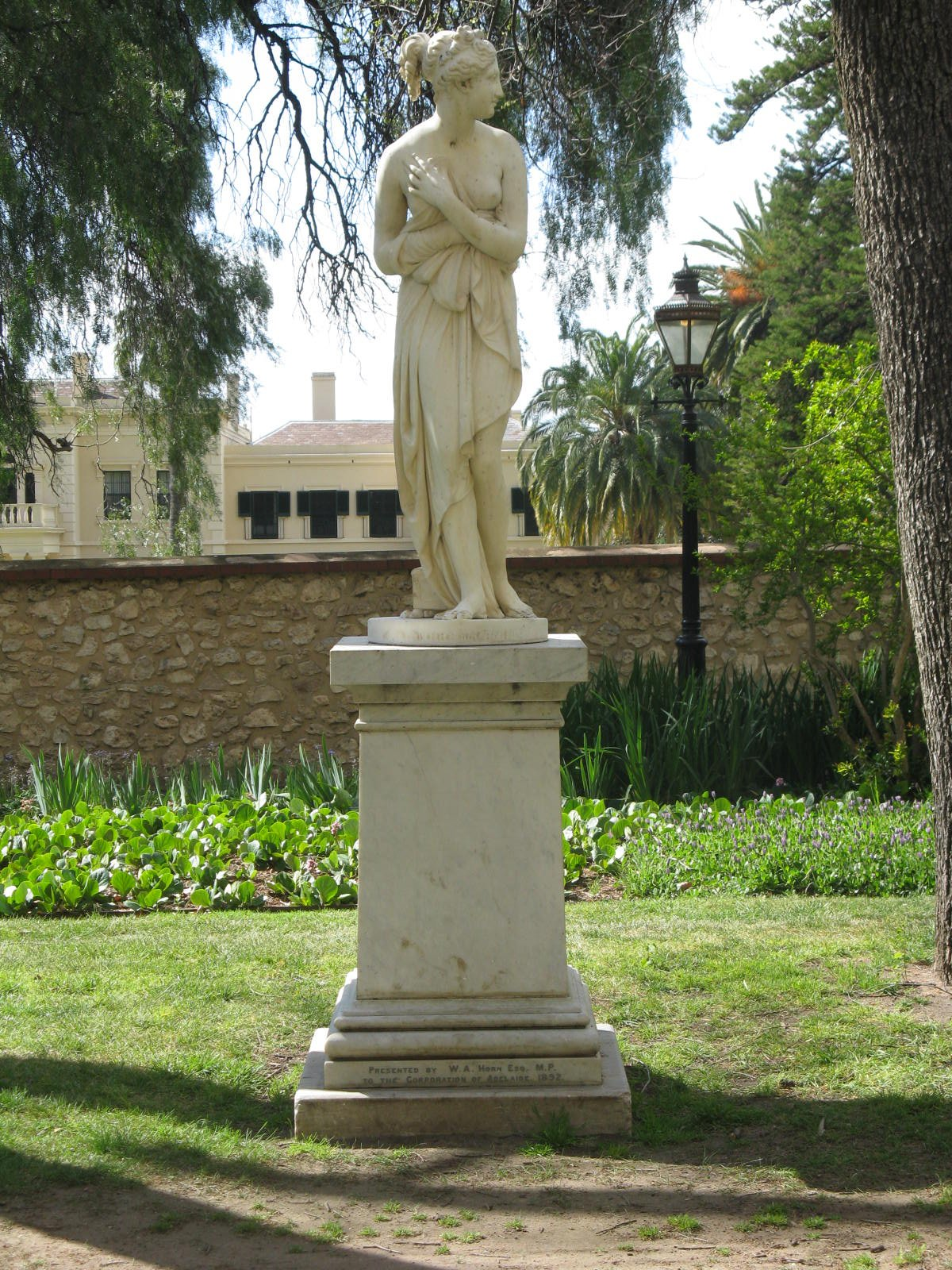
1892: First public statue, Venus (Venere Di Canova), unveiled on North Terrace.

- 1891: The Central Australia Railway reaches Oodnadatta in the far north.
- 1892: First public statue, Venus (Venere Di Canova), unveiled on North Terrace.
- 1892: Following drop in share values, Bank of South Australia taken over by the Union Bank of Australia.
- 1894: Constitutional Amendment (Adult Suffrage) Act 1894, the world's second Act granting women suffrage and the first granting women the right to stand for parliament passed in Parliament House on North Terrace.
- 1896: Moving pictures shown for first time in South Australia at Theatre Royal on Hindley Street.
- 1896: Happy Valley Reservoir opened.
- 1896: Adelaide Hospital Board of Management sacked by the Government. The dysfunctional nature of the workplace came to a head when Edward Willis Way, no friend of Premier Kingston, was accused of nepotism.
- 1897: Constitutional Convention on Federation held in Adelaide.
- 1899: South Australian contingent leaves Adelaide for the Second Boer War.
- 1899: State Referendum on Federation: South Australia votes Yes (70.2%).

== 1900s ==
=== 1900s ===
- 1900: First electricity station opened in South Australia at Grenfell Street.
- 1901: Adelaide became a state capital upon the establishment of the Commonwealth of Australia on 1 January. The Duke and Duchess of York visit.
- 1901: Whyalla founded on the upper Spencer Gulf as a port for iron ore from the Middleback Ranges.
- 1904: Adelaide Fruit and Produce Exchange opens in the East End.
- 1904: State Flag of South Australia is officially adopted.
- 1906: Federal Referendum on Senate Elections: South Australia votes Yes (86.99%).
- 1908: Outer Harbor opens.
- 1908: Adelaide High School established.
- 1909: Electric tram services begin.

=== 1910s ===
- 1910: Federal Referendum on Surplus Revenue: South Australia votes No (50.94%).
- 1911: Federal Referendum on Trade and Commerce: South Australia votes No (61.93%).
- 1912: The Verco Building, an early 'skyscraper', is built on North Terrace.
- 1913: Metropolitan abattoirs open.
- 1913: Federal Referendum on Trade and Commerce: South Australia votes Yes (51.32%).
- 1914: South Australian troops join their Australian comrades in Europe to fight in World War I.
- 1914: Torrens Island Internment Camp opens.
- 1915: Liquor bars close at 6 pm following referendum, creating the six o'clock swill.
- 1915: Torrens Island Internment Camp closes.
- 1915: Four women Justices of the Peace appointed, the first in Australia.
- 1915: Cheer-up Hut opens 4 November, first anniversary of Cheer-Up Society.
- 1917: German private schools close because of the World War I.
- 1917: First trains to Perth following completion of the Trans-Australian Railway.
- 1918: Railway line from Hallett Cove to Willunga opens.
- 1918: Mount Pleasant railway line between Balhannah and Mount Pleasant opens.
- 1919: Adelaide awarded official city status and Mayor became Lord Mayor.
- 1919: Sedan railway line between Monarto South and Sedan opens.

=== 1920s ===
- 1921: Percy Brookfield, a NSW Politician, is shot at the Riverton railway station and later dies.
- 1924: 5CL, Adelaide's first AM broadcaster commences broadcasting
- 1924: James Stobie invents the Stobie pole, now a South Australian icon.
- 1924: Township of Murray Bridge is founded.
- 1925: Wayville Showgrounds open.
- 1927: Duke and Duchess of York visit.
- 1928: Federal Referendum - South Australia votes:
  - Yes (62.68%) on State Debt
- 1929: Electric service to Glenelg commences.
- 1929: Central Australia Railway extended to Alice Springs.

=== 1930s ===
- 1932: Local government overhauled when Government redefined boundaries and names and abolished others.
- 1933: First John Martin's Christmas Pageant
- 1935: Many German place names, which had been changed during World War I, are restored.
- 1936: South Australia celebrates its centenary.
- 1936: South Australian Housing Trust is founded.
- 1937: First trolley bus services commence.
- 1937: First permanent traffic lights installed.
- 1937: Federal Referendum - South Australia Votes:
  - No (59.87%) on Aviation
  - No (79.17%) on Marketing
- 1937: Outbreak of poliomyelitis.
- 1938: South Australian Housing Trust completes first dwelling.
- 1939: Worst heat wave recorded with disastrous bushfires and highest Adelaide temperature of 47.6 °C.
- 1939: New Parliament House opened on North Terrace by the Governor-General Lord Gowrie.

=== 1940s ===
- 1940: Birkenhead Bridge opens.
- 1940: Ship building begins at Whyalla.
- 1940: Pinguin enters South Australian waters, laying sea mines along vital shipping lanes.
- 1940: Loveday POW camp opens
- 1942: Rationing of tea and clothing introduced.
- 1943: Rationing of butter introduced.
- 1944: Federal Referendum - South Australia Votes:
  - Yes (50.64%) on Post War Reconstruction and Democratic Rights
- 1944: Rationing of meat introduced.
- 1944: German submarine U-862 attacks the Greek freighter Ilissos off the Limestone Coast.
- 1945: Gas and electricity restrictions imposed.
- 1945: Hills Industries founded.
- 1946: Federal Referendum - South Australia votes:
  - Yes (51.73%) on Social Services
  - No (51.26%) on Marketing
  - No (51.80%) on Industrial Employment
- 1947: Woomera Rocket Range established.
- 1947: Orchards ripped up following discovery of fruit fly in the metropolitan area.
- 1948: Federal Referendum -[South Australia votes:
  - No (57.85%) on Rents and Prices
- 1948: Glenelg jetty destroyed and widespread damage caused by severe storms.
- 1948: Clothing and meat rationing abolished.
- 1948: Holden begins production.

=== 1950s ===
- 1950: State Election: The Liberal Party, led by Thomas Playford, holds onto government.
- 1950: Petrol, butter and tea rationing abolished.
- 1950: Port Pirie proclaimed South Australia's first provincial city.
- 1951: Federal Referendum - South Australia Votes:
  - No (52.71%) on Communists and Communism
- 1953: State Election: The Liberal Party, led by Thomas Playford, holds onto government.
- 1954: Adelaide is hit by an earthquake causing much property damage but no loss of life.
- 1954: Queen Elizabeth II makes first sovereign visit to Adelaide.
- 1954: Mannum–Adelaide pipeline completed, pumping water from the River Murray to metropolitan reservoirs.
- 1955: Adelaide Airport at West Beach opens.
- 1955: Elizabeth officially proclaimed.
- 1956: State Election: The Liberal Party, led by Thomas Playford, holds onto government
- 1956: British nuclear tests at Maralinga commence
- 1958: Queen Elizabeth The Queen Mother, visits Adelaide.
- 1958: First parking meters installed.
- 1958: South Para Reservoir opened and connected to Adelaide water supply.
- 1958: Last street tram removed, leaving only the Glenelg tram line.
- 1959: Television broadcasting commences in Adelaide with NWS-9. ADS-7 (now ADS-10) begins broadcasting one month later.
- 1959: State Election: The Liberal Party, led by Thomas Playford, holds onto government.

=== 1960s ===
- 1960: Adelaide Festival of Arts held for the first time.
- 1962: State Election: The Liberal Party, led by Thomas Playford, holds onto government.
- 1963: Port Stanvac Refinery begins operations.
- 1963: Queen Elizabeth II visits Adelaide.
- 1963: Gas discovered in the Cooper Basin.
- 1964: Record wind gust of 148 kilometres per hour recorded in Adelaide.
- 1965: State Election: The Labor Party, led by Frank Walsh, wins government for the first time in 33 years.
- 1965: Television station SAS-10 (Now SAS-7) begins broadcasting.
- 1966: Flinders University opens at Bedford Park.
- 1966: Beaumont children go missing at Glenelg beach.
- 1967: South Australian Lotteries commence.
- 1967: Liquor trading hours extended.
- 1967: Torrens Island Power Station begins operations.
- 1967: Premier Frank Walsh retires and is replaced by Don Dunstan.
- 1967: Federal Referendum - South Australia Votes:
  - Yes (86.26%) on Aboriginals
  - No (66.09%) on Parliament
- 1968: State Election: The Liberal Party, led by Steele Hall, wins government.
- 1968: Steele Hall institutes electoral reform to counter Playmander.

=== 1970s ===
- 1970: State Election: The Labor Party, led by Don Dunstan, wins government. South Australia becomes first state to reform abortion laws.
- 1971: Fluoridation of water supply commences.
- 1973: State Election: The Labor Party, led by Don Dunstan, holds onto government.
- 1973: Modbury Hospital opens.
- 1973: Two children disappear from Adelaide Oval and are never seen again.
- 1973: Federal Referendum - South Australia votes:
  - No (58.84%) on Commodity Prices
  - No (71.75%) on Incomes
- 1974: Prince Philip, The Duke of Edinburgh, visits Adelaide
- 1974: South Australian Railways split into two new entities, Australian National and State Transport Authority.
- 1974: Federal Referendum - South Australia votes:
  - No (52.86%) on Simultaneous Elections
  - No (55.74%) on Mode of Altering the Constitution
  - No (55.89%) on Democratic Elections
  - No (57.48%) on Local Government Bodies
- 1975: State Election: The Labor Party, led by Don Dunstan, holds onto government.
- 1975: The International Equestrian Exposition is held in Adelaide and attended by Princess Anne.
- 1975: The Adelaide City Council adopts the City of Adelaide Plan.
- 1976: Rundle Mall, Australia's first pedestrian mall, opens between King William and Pulteney streets.
- 1977: Queen Elizabeth and Prince Philip visit Adelaide to open the Adelaide Festival Centre.
- 1977: Late night shopping commences.
- 1977: Federal Referendum - South Australia votes:
  - Yes (65.99%) on Simultaneous Elections
  - Yes (76.59%) on Senate Vacancies
  - Yes (83.29%) on Referendums
  - Yes (85.57%) on Retirement of Judges
- 1978: Remains of five women are found in bushland near Truro; with two more victims dubbed the Truro murders.
- 1979: Don Dunstan resigns as Premier and is replaced by Des Corcoran.
- 1979: State Election: The Liberal Party, led by David Tonkin, wins government.

=== 1980s ===
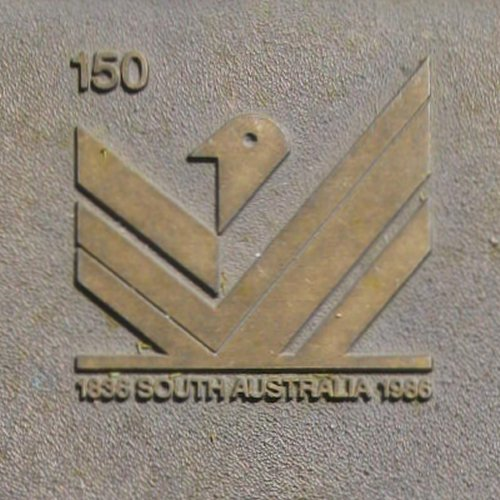
1986: South Australia celebrates its 150th Anniversary.

- 1980: Thirty-five homes destroyed in an Adelaide Hills bushfire., Central Australia Railway and Marree railway line replaced by the Tarcoola-Alice Springs railway line
- 1981: Prince Charles, The Prince of Wales, visits Adelaide.
- 1982: State Election: The Labor Party, led by John Bannon, wins government.
- 1982: International air services begin at Adelaide Airport.
- 1983: Ash Wednesday fires claim 28 lives throughout the state.
- 1983: Prince and Princess of Wales visit Adelaide.
- 1983: Wendy Chapman elected the first woman Lord Mayor of Adelaide.
- 1984: South Australia officially adopts the current Coat of Arms.
- 1984: Keswick Railway Terminal opens.
- 1984: Federal Referendum - South Australia votes:
  - No (50.02%) on Terms of Senators
  - No (54.06%) on Interchange of Powers
- 1985: State Election: The Labor Party, led by John Bannon, holds onto government.
- 1985: The Adelaide Casino opens in the Adelaide railway station as part of the multimillion-dollar Adelaide Station and Environs Redevelopment (ASER).
- 1985: The first Australian Grand Prix held on the Adelaide Street Circuit.
- 1986: Queen Elizabeth II and Prince Philip visit Adelaide.
- 1986: Pope John Paul II visits Adelaide and holds Mass to a gathering of hundreds of thousands in the East Parklands.
- 1986: The South Australian Maritime Museum opens.
- 1986: South Australia celebrates its sesqui-centenary as "Jubilee 150".
- 1987: The Collins class submarine contract awarded to the Australian Submarine Corporation at Outer Harbor.
- 1987: The Adelaide Convention Centre opens on North Terrace.
- 1988: The Prince and Princess of Wales visit Adelaide.
- 1988: Federal Referendum - South Australia votes:
  - No (73.24%) on Parliamentary Terms
  - Yes (69.39%) on Fair Elections
  - No (70.15%) on Local Government
  - Yes (73.99%) on Rights and Freedoms.
- 1989: State Election: The Labor Party, led by John Bannon, holds onto government.
- 1989: The Bicentennial Conservatory, referred to as "The Crystal Pasty", opens at the Botanic Gardens.

=== 1990s ===
- 1990: Remaining country rail passenger services from Adelaide to Mount Gambier, Whyalla and Broken Hill are axed by Australian National.
- 1990: Gillman selected as site for Japanese-backed Multifunction Polis.
- 1991: State Bank of South Australia collapses plunging South Australia into a debt of $3.1 billion.
- 1991: The University of South Australia formed from a merger of several institutions.
- 1991: Adelaide Entertainment Centre opened.
- 1991: Adelaide Football Club enters the AFL after being established in late 1990.
- 1992: First WOMADelaide, at Botanic Park
- 1992: John Bannon resigns as Premier and is replaced by Lynn Arnold.
- 1992: The final edition of The News newspaper is published.
- 1993: State Election: The Liberal Party, led by Dean Brown, wins government in a landslide.
- 1993: Poker machines installed for first time in South Australia.
- 1994: Sunday trading introduced in the Adelaide city centre.
- 1994: High-speed ferry service from Glenelg to Kangaroo Island begins.
- 1995: The Australian Grand Prix is held in Adelaide for the last time.
- 1995: United Water is contracted to manage Adelaide's water and sewerage systems.
- 1995: The Local Government (Boundary Reform) Act, 1995 passed to encourage municipal amalgamations, resulting in an overhaul of local government.
- 1997: Port Adelaide Football Club enters the AFL.
- 1997: State Election: The Liberal Party, led by John Olsen, narrowly holds onto government.
- 1997: Adelaide Football Club wins its first AFL premiership.
- 1998: Adelaide Football Club wins its second AFL premiership.
- 1999: Eight bodies are found in a disused bank vault in Snowtown, further bodies were later found, revealing Australia's worst serial killings.
- 1999: Federal Referendum - South Australia votes:
  - No (56.43%) on an Australian Republic
  - No (61.90%) on Constitution Preamble.

== 2000s ==
=== 2000s ===
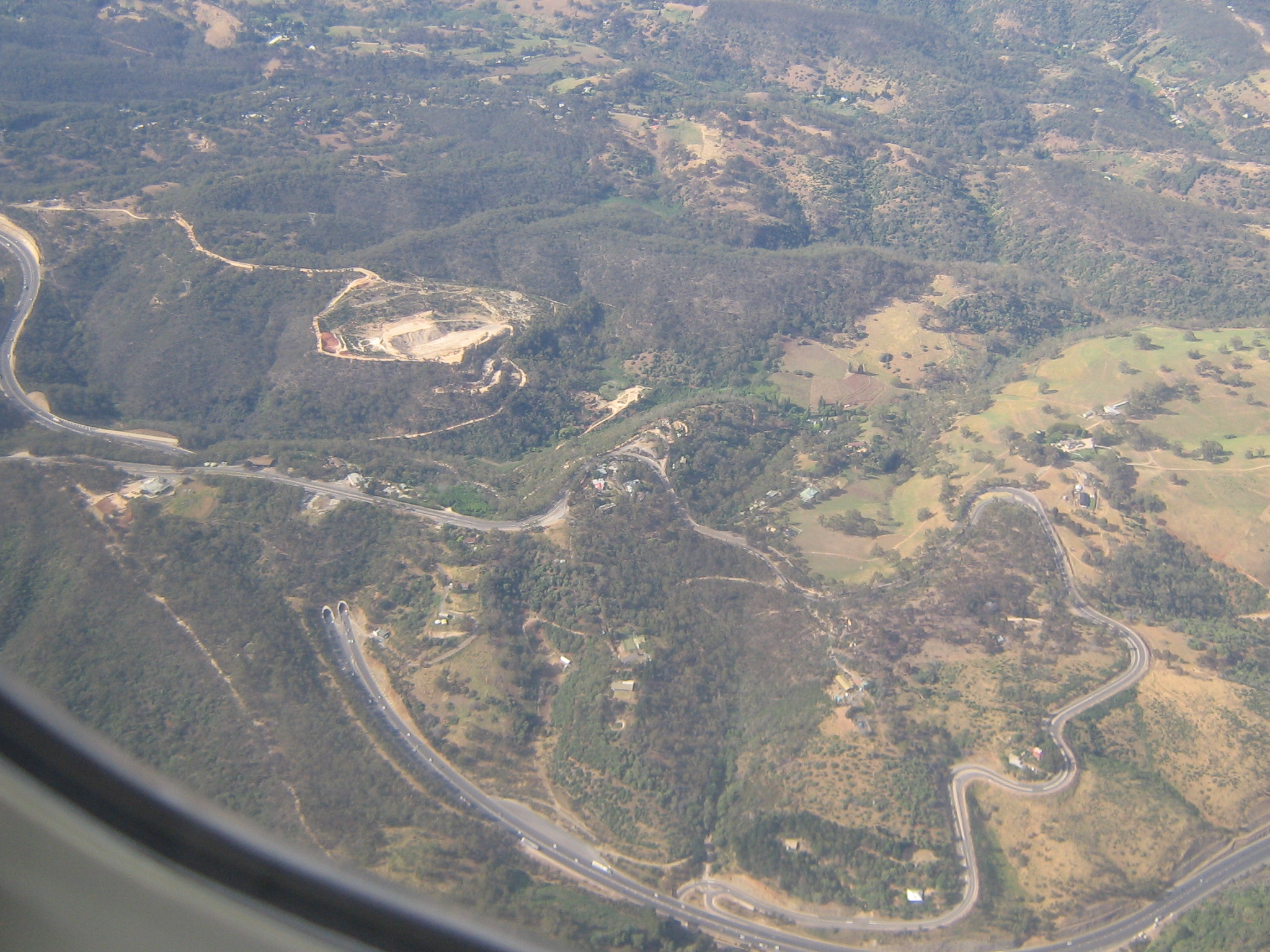
2000: South Eastern Freeway opened.

- 2000: South Eastern Freeway opened.
- 2001: John Olsen resigns as Premier and is replaced by Rob Kerin.
- 2001: The National Wine Centre of Australia opens in the north-east of the Adelaide Parklands.
- 2002: State Election: The Labor Party, led by Mike Rann, narrowly wins government.
- 2003: The transcontinental railway line from Adelaide to Darwin is completed.
- 2003: Port Stanvac Refinery closed.
- 2004: Port Adelaide Football Club wins its first AFL premiership.
- 2005: Nine people die in bushfires on the Eyre Peninsula.
- 2006: State Election: The Labor Party, led by Mike Rann, retains government in a landslide.
- 2009: Wind gusts of 152 km/h recorded at Adelaide Airport.

=== 2010s ===
- 2010: State Election: The Labor Party, led by Mike Rann, retains government with a reduced majority.
- 2010: Northern Expressway opened.
- 2014: State election, Labor Party now led by Jay Weatherill retains government with a further reduced majority
- 2014: South Road Superway opened
- 2015 Sampson Flat bushfires in January and 2015 Pinery bushfire in November both destroyed houses near Adelaide (the Pinery fire also killed two people)
- 2018: State election, Liberal Party led by Steven Marshall elected

=== 2020s ===
- 2020: COVID-19 pandemic in South Australia
- 2022: State election, Labor Party led by Peter Malinauskas elected
- 2025: Harmful algal bloom threatens coastal waters

== See also ==
- History of South Australia
- History of Adelaide
- Governors of South Australia
- Premiers of South Australia
- List of Mayors and Lord Mayors of Adelaide
