= Politics of the Australian Capital Territory =

Overview of politics in the Australian Capital Territory

The politics of the Australian Capital Territory takes place in context of a unicameral parliamentary system. The main parties are the Liberal, Labor and the Greens.

The executive government (called the Government of the Australian Capital Territory) comprises 8 portfolios, led by a ministerial department and supported by several agencies. There are also a number of independent agencies that fall under a portfolio but remain at arms-length for political reasons, such as the Integrity Commission and Electoral Commission. The territory Executive Council, consisting of the ministers, exercises the executive authority through the relevant portfolio.

The legislative branch is the unicameral territory Legislative Assembly. The judicial branch consists of three general courts (Magistrates Court, and Supreme Court), and several specialist courts such as the Coroner's Court.

== Territory politics ==
=== Australian Capital Territory Legislative Assembly ===
The Australian Capital Territory has a unicameral parliament, consisting exclusively of the Australian Capital Territory Legislative Assembly.

=== Office holders ===
The chief executive of the Australian Capital Territory is the chief minister, who is elected by the Legislative Assembly.

The Chief Minister of the Australian Capital Territory is currently Andrew Barr of the ACT Labor Party. Barr assumed office as the 7th Chief Minister on 11 December 2024. The Deputy Chief Minister of the Australian Capital Territory is Yvette Berry.

The ACT Labor has been in Government since 2001.

Officially opposing the Australian Capital Territory government is the opposition Labor Party.

The government is decided every four years by election. The most recent election was held in 2024, with the next in 2028.

=== Political parties ===
The Australian Capital Territory is currently governed by the ACT Labor Party. The two main parties are the Canberra Liberal Party, and the Labor Party. Other currently elected parties in Australian Capital Territory politics include the Greens.

== Political structure ==
The Australian Capital Territory is governed according to the principles of the Westminster system, a form of parliamentary government based on the model of the United Kingdom. Legislative power formally rests with the Parliament of Australia, but has been devolved to the Legislative Assembly.

The Governor, as representative of the Crown, is the formal repository of power, which is exercised by him or her on the advice of the Premier of South Australia and the cabinet. The Premier and ministers are appointed by the Governor, and hold office by virtue of their ability to command the support of a majority of members of the Legislative Assembly. Judicial power is exercised by the Supreme Court of the Australian Capital Territory and a system of subordinate courts, but the High Court of Australia and other federal courts have overriding jurisdiction on matters which fall under the ambit of the Australian Constitution.

== Territory party support by region ==
=== Marginal seats ===
Yerrabi, Murrumbidgee and Brindabella are considered to be marginal seats.

== Federal politics ==
The Australian Capital Territory has 3 seats in the Australian House of Representatives, less than all other jurisdictions besides the Northern Territory. Canberra, Fenner and Bean are all considered to be safe Labor seats.

== Referendum results in the Australia Capital Territory ==
| Year | No. | Name | National voters | States | ACT (Note: Residents of the Australian Capital Territory and Northern Territory could not vote in referendums until the passing of the 1977 Referendums Constitutional Amendment. The votes of those territories are counted in the national total, but not toward the count of states which have received a majority.) |
|---|---|---|---|---|---|
| 1984 | 37 | Terms of Senators | 50.64% | 2:4 | 56.68% |
| 1984 | 38 | Interchange of Powers | 47.06% | 0:6 | 56.10% |
| 1988 | 39 | Parliamentary Terms | 32.92% | 0:6 | 43.62% |
| 1988 | 40 | Fair Elections | 37.60% | 0:6 | 51.99% |
| 1988 | 41 | Local Government | 33.62% | 0:6 | 39.78% |
| 1988 | 42 | Rights and Freedoms | 30.79% | 0:6 | 40.71% |
| 1999 | 43 | Establishment of Republic | 45.13% | 0:6 | 63.27% |
| 1999 | 44 | Preamble | 39.34% | 0:6 | 43.61% |
| 2023 | 45 | Aboriginal and Torres Strait Islander Voice | 39.94% | 0:6 | 61.29% |

== Notable Australian Capital Territory political figures ==
- Jon Stanhope, 5th chief minister of the Australian Capital Territory, longest serving chief minister
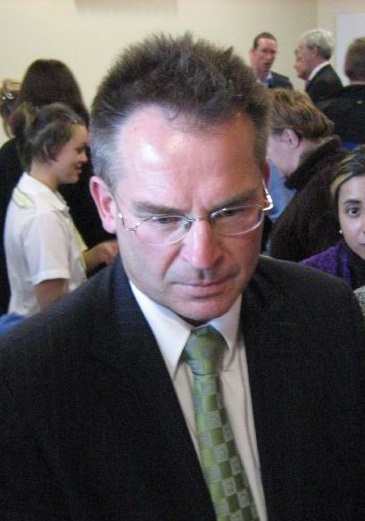
Jon Stanhope

== Recent territory election results ==
| Year | Primary vote | | |
| Year | ALP | LPA | Oth. |
|---|---|---|---|
| 2001 | 41.72% | 31.64% | 26.64 |
| 2004 | 46.84% | 34.81% | 18.35 |
| 2008 | 37.39% | 31.59% | 31.04% |
| 2012 | 38.88% | 38.90% | 22.23% |
| 2016 | 38.43% | 36.72% | 24.86% |
| 2020 | 37.82% | 33.81% | 28.38% |
| 2024 | 34.15% | 33.45% | 32.39% |

== See also ==
- Chief Ministers of the Australian Capital Territory
