= Politics of the Northern Territory =

Overview of politics in the Northern Territory

The politics of Northern Territory takes place in context of a bicameral parliamentary system. The main parties are the Country Liberal and the Labor parties. Other minor political parties include the Greens.

The executive government (called the Northern Territory Government) comprises 8 portfolios, led by a ministerial department and supported by several agencies. There are also a number of independent agencies that fall under a portfolio but remain at arms-length for political reasons, such as the Independent Commissioner Against Corruption and Electoral Commission. The territory Executive Council, consisting of the administrator and ministers, exercises the executive authority through the relevant portfolio.

The legislative branch is the unicameral territory Legislative Assembly. The judicial branch consists of three general courts (Local Court, and Supreme Court), and several specialist courts such as the Coroner's Court. The Northern Territory Legislative Council was the partly elected governing body from 1947 until its replacement by the fully elected Northern Territory Legislative Assembly in 1974. The total enrolment for the 1947 election was 4,443. The Northern Territory was split into five electorates: Darwin, Alice Springs, Tennant Creek, Batchelor, and Stuart.

== Territory politics ==
=== Northern Territory Legislative Assembly ===
The Australian state of the Northern Territory has a unicameral parliament, consisting exclusively of the Northern Territory Legislative Assembly. The Government of Australia is represented by the Administrator, who formally appoints the chief minister, as nominated by the majority party in the Assembly.

=== Office holders ===
The formal chief executive of the Northern Territory is the administrator, who is appointed as the federal government's representative on the advice of the head of the governing party. The current administrator is Hugh Heggie. The administrator holds limited reserve powers, but with few exceptions is required by convention to act on the advice of the government.

The Chief Minister of the Northern Territory is currently Lia Finocchiaro of the Country Liberal Party. The 14th Chief Minister, Finocchiaro assumed office on 28 August 2024. The Deputy Chief Minister of the Northern Territory is Gerard Maley.

Officially opposing the Northern Territory government is the opposition Labor Party.

The government is decided every four years by election. The most recent election was held in 2022, with the next in 2028.

=== Political parties ===
The Northern Territory is currently governed by the Country Liberal Party. The two main parties are the Country Liberal Party, and the Labor Party. Other currently elected parties in Northern Territory politics include the Greens.

== Political structure ==
The Northern Territory is governed according to the principles of the Westminster system, a form of parliamentary government based on the model of the United Kingdom. Legislative power formally rests with the Parliament of Australia, but has been devolved to the Legislative Assembly—together known as the Parliament of South Australia. Executive power is exercised by the Executive Council, which consists of the Governor and senior ministers.

The Governor, as representative of the Crown, is the formal repository of power, which is exercised by him or her on the advice of the Premier of South Australia and the cabinet. The Premier and ministers are appointed by the Governor, and hold office by virtue of their ability to command the support of a majority of members of the Legislative Assembly. Judicial power is exercised by the Supreme Court of the Northern Territory and a system of subordinate courts, but the High Court of Australia and other federal courts have overriding jurisdiction on matters which fall under the ambit of the Australian Constitution.

== Territory party support by region ==
=== Country Liberal ===
Palmerston is considered to be a safe Labor seat.

=== Labor ===
The suburbs of Darwin are considered to be safe Labor seats.

=== Marginal seats ===
Drysdale and Barkly are considered to be marginal seats.

== Federal politics ==
The Northern Territory has 2 seats in the Australian House of Representatives, the least of any state or territory. Both Lingari and Solomon are considered marginal seats.

== Referendum results in the Northern Territory ==
=== Results of referendums ===
Year	No.	Name	National voters	States	NT
1984	37	Terms of Senators	50.64%	2:4	51.87%
1984	38	Interchange of Powers	47.06%	0:6	47.78%
1988	39	Parliamentary Terms	32.92%	0:6	38.13%
1988	40	Fair Elections	37.60%	0:6	42.99%
1988	41	Local Government	33.62%	0:6	38.80%
1988	42	Rights and Freedoms	30.79%	0:6	37.14%
1999	43	Establishment of Republic	45.13%	0:6	48.77%
1999	44	Preamble	39.34%	0:6	38.52%
2023	45	Aboriginal and Torres Strait Islander Voice	39.94%	0:6	39.70%

== Notable Northern Territory political figures ==
- Marshall Perron, 4th chief minister of the Northern Territory, longest serving chief minister
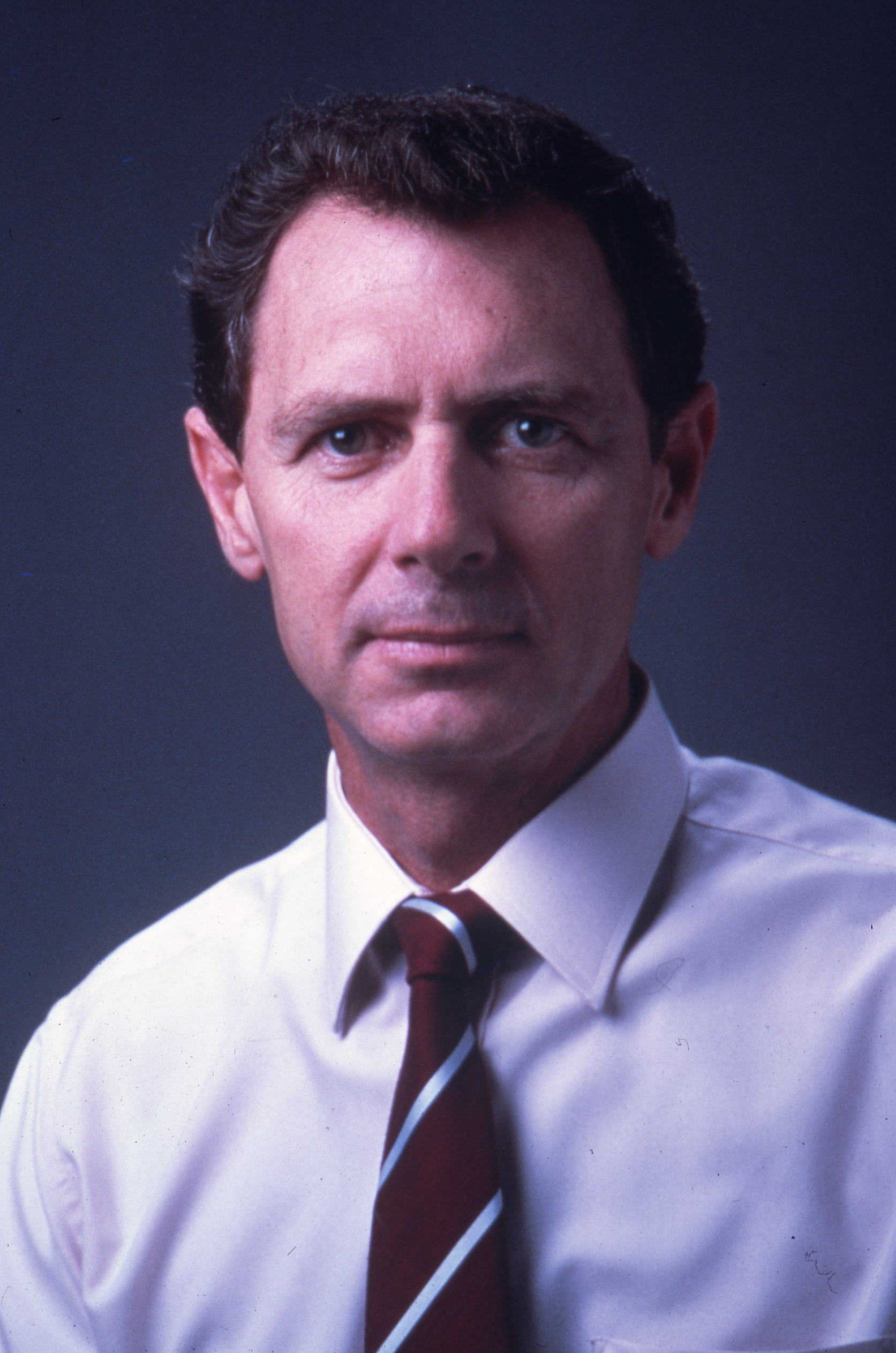
Marshall Perron

== Recent territory election results ==
	Primary vote		
	ALP	LPA	Oth.
2005 Northern Territory general election	51.94%	35.73%	12.33%
2008 Northern Territory general election	43.18%	45.40%	11.42%
2012 Northern Territory general election	36.46%	50.63%	12.91%
2016 Northern Territory general election	42.19%	31.80%	26.00%
2020 Northern Territory general election	39.43%	31.34%	29.32%
2021 Northern Territory general election	28.79%	48.89%	22.32%

== See also ==
- Chief Ministers of the Northern Territory
- Administrator of the Northern Territory
- Electoral results for the Australian Senate in the Northern Territory
