= Legislative Assembly of Queensland =

Chamber of Queensland Parliament

Legislative Assembly
- 58th Parliament
- Badge of the Parliament of Queensland

Type
- Type: Unicameral house of the Parliament of Queensland

History
- Founded: 22 May 1860; 166 years ago

Leadership
- Speaker: Pat Weir, Liberal National since 26 November 2024
- Premier: David Crisafulli, Liberal National since 28 October 2024
- Leader of the House: Christian Rowan, Liberal National since 1 November 2024
- Leader of the Opposition: Steven Miles, Labor since 28 October 2024
- Manager of Opposition Business: Mick de Brenni, Labor since 5 November 2024

Structure
- Seats: 93
- Political groups: Government (53): Liberal National (53); Opposition (36): Labor (36); Crossbench (4): Katter's Australian (2); Greens (1); Independent (1)
- Length of term: 4 years

Elections
- Voting system: Full preferential voting
- First election: 27 April – 11 May 1860
- Last election: 26 October 2024
- Next election: On or before 28 October 2028

Meeting place
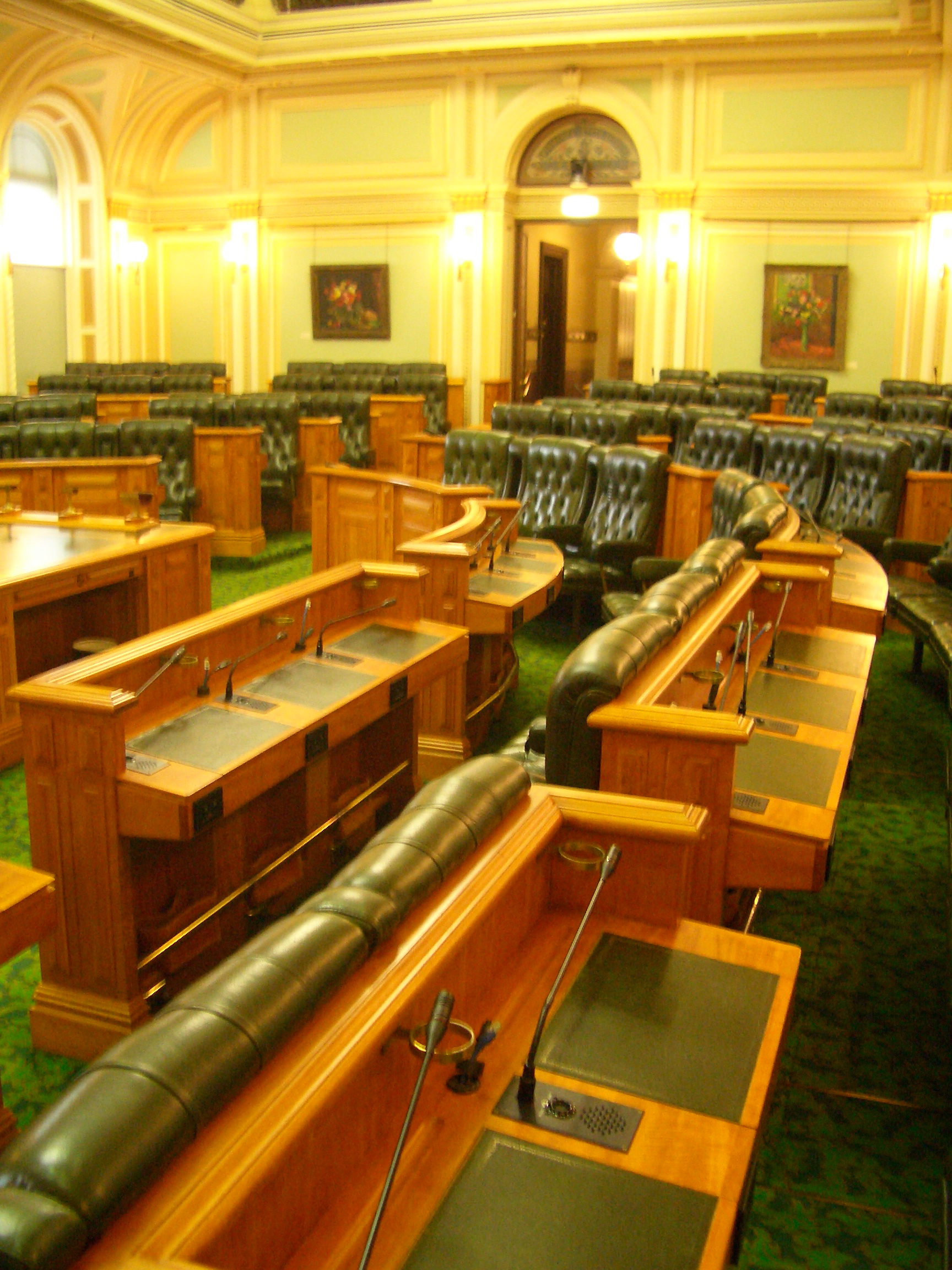
- Legislative Assembly Chamber, Parliament House, Brisbane, Queensland, Australia

Website
- parliament.qld.gov.au

The Legislative Assembly of Queensland is the sole chamber of the Parliament of Queensland, established under the provisions of the state constitution. Elections are held at fixed four-year intervals and are conducted by way of full preferential voting. The Assembly has 93 members, who are entitled to use the post-nominal letters MP (having been styled as MLAs prior to 2000). Under the principles of Westminster government and the fusion of powers, the executive (consisting of the premier and cabinet ministers) is drawn from the membership of the legislature. Government is formed by the party or coalition with a majority of seats in the Assembly, with the Governor of Queensland formally appointing officeholders.

Each electorate has roughly the same population; however, this has not always been the case. A system of malapportionment dubbed the Bjelkemander (not, strictly speaking, a gerrymander) was in effect during the 1970s and 1980s. The Assembly first sat in May 1860 and produced Australia's first Hansard in April 1864.

Following the outcome of the 2015 election, amendments to the Electoral Act in early 2016 added an additional four parliamentary seats (bringing the total from 89 to 93), changed the voting system from optional preferential voting to full preferential voting, and replaced unfixed three-year terms with fixed four-year terms. As of August 2026, the Liberal National Party (LNP) has 53 of 93 seats and forms majority government within the chamber.

== History ==
=== 1860–1948 ===
Initially, the Legislative Assembly was the lower house of a bicameral parliament influenced by the Westminster system. The upper house was the Legislative Council, its members appointed for life by the governor, on advice of the government of the day. The first sitting, in May 1860, was held in the old converted convict barracks in Queen Street. It consisted of 26 members from 16 electorates, nearly half of whom were pastoralists or squatters. Early sessions dealt with issues of land, labour, railways, public works, immigration, education and gold discoveries.

In April 1864, Australia's first Hansard was produced. That year also saw member numbers increased to 32, and by 1868—as more redistributions occurred—the number grew to 42. Members were not paid until 1886, effectively excluding the working class from state politics.

The Assembly was elected under the first-past-the-post (plurality) system from 1860 to 1892. From then until 1942 an unusual form of preferential voting called the contingent vote was used. This was introduced by a conservative government to hinder the emerging Labor Party from gaining seats with minority support.

In 1942 the plurality system was reintroduced. The Labor government then in power had seen its vote decline in the 1940s and sought to divide the opposition. In 1962, it was replaced with full preferential voting, as the governing conservatives wanted to take advantage of a split in Labor. In 1992, this was changed to the optional preferential system which was used until full preferential voting was reinstated in 2016.

After 1912, electorates elected only a single member to the Assembly. In 1922, the Legislative Council was abolished, with the help of members known as the suicide squad, who were specially appointed to vote the chamber out of existence. This left Queensland with a unicameral parliament—the only Australian state with this arrangement.

=== Queensland's gerrymander 1948–1989 ===
From 1948 until the reforms following the end of the Bjelke-Petersen era, Queensland used an electoral zoning system that was tweaked by the government of the day to maximise its own voter support at the expense of the opposition. It has been called a form of gerrymander, dubbed the "Bjelkemander"; however it is more accurately considered an electoral malapportionment. In a classic gerrymander, electoral boundaries are drawn to take advantage of known pockets of supporters and to isolate areas of opposition voters so as to maximise the number of seats for the government for a given number of votes and to cause opposition support to be "wasted" by concentrating their supporters in relatively fewer electorates.

The Queensland "gerrymander", first introduced by the Labor Party (ALP) government of Ned Hanlon in 1949, used a series of electoral zones based on their distance from Brisbane.

Initially Queensland was divided into three zones—the metropolitan zone (Brisbane), the provincial cities zone (which also included rural areas around provincial cities) and the rural zone. While the number of electors in each seat in a zone was roughly equal, there was considerable variation in the number of electors between zones. Thus an electorate in the remote zone might have as few as 5,000 electors, while a seat in the metropolitan zone might have as many as 25,000. Using this system the Labor government was able to maximise its vote, particularly in its power base of the provincial city zone.

With the split in the party in the late 1950s, the ALP lost office and a conservative Coalition government led by the Country Party (later National Party) under Frank Nicklin came to power, which, as discussed above, initially modified the voting system to introduce preferential voting to take advantage of Labor's split. It also separated the provincial cities from their hinterlands. The hinterlands were added to the rural zone, where new Country Party seats were created.

As the divisions in the ALP abated in the early 1970s, and tensions in the conservative coalition grew, (thus reducing the advantage to be gained by the use of preferential voting), the conservative government, now led by Joh Bjelke-Petersen, modified the zoning system to add a fourth zone—a remote zone, comprising seats with even fewer electors. Thus the conservative government was able to isolate Labor support in provincial cities and maximise its own rural power base. On average, the Country Party needed only 7,000 votes to win a seat, compared with 12,800 for a typical Labor seat.

The entrenchment of a Coalition government was also caused by socio-economic and demographic changes associated with mechanisation of farms and urbanisation which led to a drift of working class population from rural and remote electorates to the cities.

By the late 1980s the decline in the political fortunes of the National Party, together with rapid growth in south east Queensland meant that the zonal system was no longer able to guarantee a conservative victory.

In addition, in 1988 the Federal Labor Government held four constitutional referendums—one of which was for the adoption of fair electoral systems around Australia. Although the referendum did not succeed, it heightened public awareness of the issue. A large public interest non-partisan organisation, the Citizens for Democracy, lobbied extensively the Liberal and Labor parties to abolish the gerrymander and to make it a major issue in the lead up to the landmark 1989 Queensland election.

Notwithstanding the malapportionment, Labor was rarely able to garner a higher percentage of the vote than the Coalition for most of this period.

=== 1989–present ===
In 1989 Labor won government, promising to implement the recommendations of the Fitzgerald Inquiry into police corruption, including the establishment of an Electoral and Administrative Reform Commission (EARC). EARC recommended the abolition of the zonal system in favour of a "modified one vote, one value" system. Under this proposal, subsequently adopted, most electorates consisted of approximately the same number of electors, but with a greater tolerance for fewer electors allowed in a limited number of remote electorates. This plan is still in use today. Currently 42 seats are contested in Greater Brisbane and 47 in the rest of the state.

The youngest person ever elected to Queensland's Legislative Assembly was Lawrence Springborg, former Minister for Natural Resources and Leader of the Opposition. In 1989, he entered parliament aged 21.

== Parliament House ==
The Queensland Legislative Assembly sits in Parliament House in the Brisbane central business district. The building was completed in 1891. The lower house chamber is decorated dark green in the traditional Westminster style. The chamber once featured central tables which divided two rows of elevated benches on each side. The room is now configured in a U-shape away from the Speaker's chair with three rows of benches that have their own desks and microphones.

The Aboriginal flag and the Torres Strait Islander flag were introduced onto the floor of the Legislative Assembly chamber in 2007.

== Distribution of seats ==
As of November 2025, the LNP (Liberal National Party) has 53 out of the 93 seats and makes up a majority government.

As of May 2026, the composition of Parliament is:

Party	Seats	
Party		Current Assembly (total 93 seats)
Liberal National	53	
Labor	36	
Katter's Australian	2	
Greens	1	
Independent	1	

Note: 47 votes is the majority required to pass legislation.

== See also ==
- 2024 Queensland state election
- Members of the Queensland Legislative Assembly by date
- Category:Members of the Queensland Legislative Assembly by name
- Parliaments of the Australian states and territories
- Electoral districts of Queensland
- Politics of Queensland
