= 1974 Australian referendum (Simultaneous Elections) =

1974 Australian Simultaneous Elections referendum
- 18 May 1974
- An Act to alter the Constitution so as to ensure that Senate elections are held at the same time as House of Representatives elections. Do you approve the proposed law?

Results
Choice	Votes	%
Yes	3,519,710	48.30%
No	3,767,138	51.70%
Valid votes	7,286,848	98.33%
Invalid or blank votes	123,663	1.67%
Total votes	7,410,511	100.00%
Registered voters/turnout	7,759,714	95.5%

The Constitution Alteration (Simultaneous Elections) Bill 1974, was an unsuccessful proposal to alter the Australian Constitution to require simultaneous elections for the House of Representatives and the Senate. It was put to voters for approval in a referendum held on 18 May 1974. Previous elections to the House of Representatives and the Senate had usually held simultaneously although this was a matter of convention rather than constitutional law. Election terms had lost synchronisation in the 1960s with separate half Senate elections in 1964, 1967 and 1970.

The bill to amend the constitution was passed by the House of Representatives however it was rejected by the Senate. Instead the referendum was put to voters using the deadlock provision in Section 128.

== Question ==
Proposed law entitled "An Act to alter the Constitution so as to ensure that Senate elections are held at the same time as House of Representatives elections".

Do you approve the proposed law?

== Results ==
Result (Note: Handbook of the 44th Parliament (2014) "Part 5 - Referendums and Plebiscites - Referendum results". Parliamentary Library of Australia.)
State	Electoral roll	Ballots issued	For		Against		Informal
State	Electoral roll	Ballots issued	Vote	%	Vote	%	Informal
New South Wales	2,834,558	2,702,903	1,359,485	51.06	1,303,117	48.94	40,301
Victoria	2,161,474	2,070,893	1,001,111	49.19	1,033,969	50.81	35,813
Queensland	1,154,762	1,098,401	481,092	44.32	604,444	55.68	12,865
South Australia	750,308	722,434	332,369	47.14	372,666	52.86	17,399
Western Australia	612,016	577,989	248,860	44.07	315,786	55.93	13,343
Tasmania	246,596	237,891	96,793	41.37	137,156	58.63	3,942
Total for Commonwealth	7,759,714	7,410,511	3,519,710	48.30	3,767,138	51.70	123,663
Results	Obtained majority in one state and an overall minority of 247,428 votes. Not carried						

== Proposed changes to the text of the constitution ==
The proposal was to alter the constitution as follows (removed text stricken through; substituted text in bold):

Section 7
~~The senators shall be chosen for a term of six years, and~~ The names of the senators chosen for each State shall be certified by the Governor to the Governor‑General.

Section 9
The Parliament ~~of a State~~ may make laws for determining the times and places of elections of senators ~~for the State~~.

Section 12
(1.) The Governor of any State may cause writs to be issued for elections of senators for the State.
(2.) ~~In case of the dissolution of the Senate~~ The writs shall be issued within ten days from the ~~proclamation of such dissolution~~ date on which the places to be filled became vacant

Section 13
(1.) Subject to this Constitution, the term of service of a senator expires upon the expiry or dissolution of the second House of Representatives to expire or be dissolved after he was chosen or, if there is an earlier dissolution of the Senate, upon that dissolution.
(2.) As soon as may be ~~after the Senate first meets, and~~ after the first meeting of the Senate following a dissolution ~~thereof~~ of the Senate, the Senate shall, in accordance with the succeeding provisions of this section, divide the senators chosen for each State into two classes~~, as nearly equal in number as practicable; and the places of the senators of the first class shall become vacant at the expiration of the third year three years, and the places of those of the second class at the expiration of the sixth year six years, from the beginning of their term of service; and afterwards the places of senators shall become vacant at the expiration of six years from the beginning of their term of service~~.
(3.) In the case of each State, where the number of senators to be divided is an even number the number of senators in each of the two classes shall be equal and where the number of senators to be divided is an odd number the number of senators in the first class shall be one more than the number in the second class.
(4.) Sub-section (1.) of this section applies to senators included in the first class, but the term of service of senators included in the second class expires upon the expiry or dissolution of the first House of Representatives to expire or be dissolved after they were chosen.
(5.) Where, since the election of senators for a State following a dissolution of the Senate but before the division of the senators for that State into classes in pursuance of this section, the place of a senator chosen at that election has become vacant, the division of senators shall be made as if the place of that senator had not so become vacant and, for the purposes of section fifteen of this Constitution, the term of service of that senator shall be deemed to be, and to have been, the period for which he would have held his place, in accordance with this section, if his place had not become vacant.
(6.) Subject to sub-section (7.) of this section, in the case of a senator holding office at the commencement of this section—

(a) if his term of service would, under the provisions in force before that commencement, have expired on the thirtieth day of June, One thousand nine hundred and seventy-seven, his term of service shall expire upon the expiry or dissolution of the second House of Representatives to expire or be dissolved after that commencement or, if there is an earlier dissolution of the Senate, upon that dissolution; or
(b) if his term of service would, under the provisions in force before that commencement, have expired on the thirtieth day of June, one thousand nine hundred and eighty, his term of service shall expire upon the expiry or dissolution of the third House of Representatives to expire or be dissolved after that commencement or, if there is an earlier dissolution of the Senate, upon that dissolution.

(7.) A senator holding office at the commencement of this section under the first paragraph of section fifteen of this Constitution shall hold office until the expiry or dissolution of the first House of Representatives to expire or be dissolved after that commencement unless, being a senator appointed by the Governor of the State, he is sooner replaced by a person chosen by the Parliament of a State under that paragraph.
(8.) For the purposes of the election, in accordance with the second paragraph of section fifteen of this Constitution, of a successor to a senator chosen by the people of a State, before the commencement of this section, for a term expiring after that commencement but whose place became vacant before that commencement, that senator shall be deemed to have been elected for a term expiring at the time when his term would have expired by virtue of sub-section (6.) of this section if his place had not become vacant.
(9.) If the Senate was dissolved within six months before the commencement of this section and an election of senators was held before that commencement, this section has effect in relation to the senators chosen at that election as if the reference in sub-section (2.) of this section to the first meeting of the Senate following a dissolution of the Senate were a reference to the first meeting of the Senate following that commencement, and any division of the senators into classes made before that commencement shall be deemed to have been of no effect.
~~The election to fill vacant places shall be made within one year before the places are to become vacant.~~
~~For the purposes of this section the term of service of a senator shall be taken to begin on the first day of July following the day of his election, except in the cases of the first election and of the election next after any dissolution of the Senate, when it shall be taken to begin on the first day of July preceding the day of his election.~~
Section 15
If the place of a senator becomes vacant before the expiration of his term of service, the Houses of Parliament of the State for which he was chosen shall, sitting and voting together, choose a person to hold the place ~~until the expiration of the term, or until the election of a successor as hereinafter provided, whichever first happens~~ until the next expiry or dissolution of the House of Representatives. But if the Houses of Parliament of the State are not in session at the time when the vacancy is notified, the Governor of the State, with the advice of the Executive Council thereof, may appoint a person to hold the place until the expiration of fourteen days after the beginning of the next session of the Parliament of the State, or ~~until the election of a successor~~ until the next expiry or dissolution of the House of Representatives, whichever first happens.

At the next ~~general election of members of the House of Representatives, or at the next~~ election of senators for the State, ~~whichever first happens,~~ a successor shall, if the term has not then expired, be chosen to hold the place from the date of his election until the expiration of the term.

The name of any senator so chosen or appointed shall be certified by the Governor of the State to the Governor-General.

== Discussion ==
This was the first unsuccessful referendum that sought to enable simultaneous elections of the House of Representatives and the Senate.

Simultaneous election results
Question	NSW	Vic	Qld	SA	WA	Tas	ACT (Note: Following the 1977 referendum, votes cast in the territories count towards the national total, but are not counted toward any state total.)	NT	States in favour	Voters in favour	Result
(29) 1974 Simultaneous Elections	51.1%	49.2%	44.3%	47.1%	44.1%	41.4%	—N/a	—N/a	1:5	48.3%	Not carried
(33) 1977 Simultaneous Elections	70.7%	65.0%	47.5%	66.0%	48.5%	34.3%	—N/a	—N/a	3:3	62.2%	Not carried
(37) 1984 Terms of Senators	52.9%	53.2%	45.7%	50.0%	46.5%	39.3%	56.7%	51.9%	2:4	50.6%	Not carried
(39) 1988 Parliamentary Terms	31.7%	36.2%	35.2%	26.8%	30.7%	25.3%	43.6%	38.1%	0:6	32.9%	Not carried

== See also ==
- Referendums in Australia
- Politics of Australia
- History of Australia
