= 1977 Australian referendum (Simultaneous Elections) =

Unsuccessful referendum

Australian Simultaneous Elections referendum, 1977
- 21 May 1977
- It is proposed to alter the Constitution to ensure that Senate elections are held at the same time as House of Representatives elections. Do you approve of the proposed law?
- Outcome: Not carried, A majority "yes" vote nationally, but in only three states.

Results
Choice	Votes	%
Yes	4,648,407	62.22%
No	2,822,547	37.78%
Valid votes	7,470,954	98.23%
Invalid or blank votes	134,928	1.77%
Total votes	7,605,882	100.00%
Registered voters/turnout	8,242,383	92.28%
- Results by state, and division
- Note: Saturation of colour denotes strength of vote.

The Constitution Alteration (Simultaneous Elections) Bill 1977, was an unsuccessful proposal to alter the Australian Constitution to enable simultaneous elections for the House of Representatives and the Senate. It was put to voters for approval in a referendum held on 21 May 1977.

== Question ==
It is proposed to alter the Constitution to ensure that Senate elections are held at the same time as House of Representatives elections.

Do you approve the proposed law?

== Background ==
The bill was substantially the same as the proposal that had been unsuccessful at the referendum in 1974. Despite the title, the proposal was to change the terms of senators from a fixed 6 years to 2 terms of the House of Representatives. The proposal did not expressly require elections for both houses to be held at the same time, instead it made the terms of Senators the same as for the House of Representatives and would give parliament the power to make laws about the time and places for elections.

=== Yes case ===
The Yes case was that because elections for the houses were out of alignment, there could be 4 elections in the next 4 years. If the Senate used its power to force an election, half the senators would also face elections.

=== No case ===
The Liberals had campaigned against the 1974 referendum on the basis that the title of the bill was a fraud and was designed to mislead voters from the real change which was to alter the Constitution so that the terms of Senators would be two terms of the House of Representatives. The no case in this referendum took a similar line, that the proposal didn't require simultaneous elections and instead was a proposal to enable governments to dissolve half the Senate. In Queensland, the National Party Premier, Joh Bjelke-Petersen, campaigned against the proposal on the basis that it would permit the senate to be abolished.

== Results ==
Result (Note: Handbook of the 44th Parliament (2014) "Part 5 - Referendums and Plebiscites - Referendum results". Parliamentary Library of Australia.)
State	Electoral roll	Ballots issued	For		Against		Informal
State	Electoral roll	Ballots issued	Vote	%	Vote	%	Informal
New South Wales	3,007,511	2,774,388	1,931,775	70.71	800,331	29.29	42,282
Victoria	2,252,831	2,083,136	1,325,708	65.00	713,929	35.00	43,499
Queensland	1,241,426	1,138,842	534,968	47.51	590,942	52.49	12,932
South Australia	799,243	745,990	480,827	65.99	247,762	34.01	17,401
Western Australia	682,291	617,463	292,344	48.47	310,765	51.53	14,354
Tasmania	259,081	246,063	82,785	34.26	158,818	65.74	4,460
Total for Commonwealth	8,242,383	7,605,882	4,648,407	62.22	2,822,547	37.78	134,928
Results	Obtained majority in three states and an overall majority of 1,825,860 votes. Not carried						

== Proposed changes to the text of the constitution ==
The proposal was to alter the constitution as follows (removed text stricken through; substituted text in bold):

Section 7
~~The senators shall be chosen for a term of six years, and~~ The names of the senators chosen for each State shall be certified by the Governor to the Governor‑General.

Section 9
The Parliament ~~of a State~~ may make laws for determining the times and places of elections of senators ~~for the State~~.

Section 12
(1.) The Governor of any State may cause writs to be issued for elections of senators for the State.
(2.) ~~In case of the dissolution of the Senate~~ The writs shall be issued within fourteen ~~ten~~ days from the ~~proclamation of such dissolution~~ date on which the places to be filled became vacant

Section 13
(1.) Subject to this Constitution, the term of service of a senator expires upon the expiry or dissolution of the second House of Representatives to expire or be dissolved after he was chosen or, if there is an earlier dissolution of the Senate, upon that dissolution.
(2.) As soon as may be ~~after the Senate first meets, and~~ after the first meeting of the Senate following a dissolution ~~thereof~~ of the Senate, the Senate shall divide the senators chosen for each State into two classes~~, as nearly equal in number as practicable; and the places of the senators of the first class shall become vacant at the expiration of the third year three years, and the places of those of the second class at the expiration of the sixth year six years, from the beginning of their term of service; and afterwards the places of senators shall become vacant at the expiration of six years from the beginning of their term of service~~.
(3.) In the case of each State, where the number of senators to be divided is an even number the number of senators in each of the two classes shall be equal and where the number of senators to be divided is an odd number the number of senators in the first class shall be one more than the number in the second class.
(4.) Sub-section (1.) of this section applies to senators included in the first class, but the term of service of senators included in the second class expires upon the expiry or dissolution of the first House of Representatives to expire or be dissolved after they were chosen.
(5.) Where, since the election of senators for a State following a dissolution of the Senate but before the division of the senators for that State into classes in pursuance of this section, the place of a senator chosen at that election has become vacant, the division of senators shall be made as if the place of that senator had not so become vacant and, for the purposes of section fifteen of this Constitution, the term of service of that senator shall be deemed to be, and to have been, the period for which he would have held his place, in accordance with this section, if his place had not so become vacant.
(6.) In the case of a senator holding office at the commencement of this section—

(a) if his term of service would, under the provisions in force before that commencement, have expired on the thirtieth day of June, One thousand nine hundred and seventy-eight, his term of service shall expire upon the expiry or dissolution of the first House of Representatives to expire or be dissolved after that commencement; or
(b) if his term of service would, under the provisions in force before that commencement, have expired on the thirtieth day of June, One thousand nine hundred and eighty-one, his term of service shall expire upon the expiry or dissolution of the second House of Representatives to expire or be dissolved after that commencement or, if there is an earlier dissolution of the Senate, upon that dissolution.

~~The election to fill vacant places shall be made within one year before the places are to become vacant.~~
~~For the purposes of this section the term of service of a senator shall be taken to begin on the first day of July following the day of his election, except in the cases of the first election and of the election next after any dissolution of the Senate, when it shall be taken to begin on the first day of July preceding the day of his election.~~

Casual Vacancies

The Senate Casual Vacancies bill proposed to change the way in which casual vacancies were filled and so the proposal included that the following amendments would not take effect if that referendum was carried.

Section 13
(7.) Notwithstanding sub-section (6.) of this section, where, at the commencement of this section, a senator chosen or appointed under the first paragraph of section fifteen of this Constitution, in consequence of a vacancy that had at any time occurred in the place of a senator chosen by the people of a State, was holding office—

(a) if he was chosen by the Houses of Parliament of the State, he shall be deemed to hold office until the expiry or dissolution of the first House of Representatives to expire or be dissolved after that commencement; or
(b) if he was appointed by the Governor of the State, he shall be deemed to have been appointed to hold the place until the expiration of fourteen days after the beginning of the next session of the Parliament of the State that commenced or commences after he was appointed and further action under section fifteen of this Constitution shall be taken as if the vacancy in the place of a senator chosen by the people of the State had occurred after that commencement.

(8.) For the purposes of the election, in accordance with the second paragraph of section fifteen of this Constitution, of a successor to a senator chosen by the people of a State, before the commencement of this section, who had a term expiring after that commencement but whose place became vacant before that commencement, that senator shall be deemed to have had a term expiring at the time when his term would have expired by virtue of sub-section (6.) of this section if his place had not become vacant.
Section 15
If the place of a senator becomes vacant before the expiration of his term of service, the Houses of Parliament of the State for which he was chosen shall, sitting and voting together, choose a person to hold the place ~~until the expiration of the term, or until the election of a successor as hereinafter provided, whichever first happens~~ until the next expiry or dissolution of the House of Representatives. But if the Houses of Parliament of the State are not in session at the time when the vacancy is notified, the Governor of the State, with the advice of the Executive Council thereof, may appoint a person to hold the place until the expiration of fourteen days after the beginning of the next session of the Parliament of the State, or ~~until the election of a successor~~ until the next expiry or dissolution of the House of Representatives, whichever first happens.

At the next ~~general election of members of the House of Representatives, or at the next~~ election of senators for the State, ~~whichever first happens,~~ a successor shall, if the term has not then expired, be chosen to hold the place from the date of his election until the expiration of the term.

== Discussion ==
For a referendum to approve an amendment of the constitution, it must ordinarily achieve a double majority: approved by a majority of states (i.e., four of the six states) as well as a majority of those voting nationwide. This was the fourth of five referendums (as of October 2021) to achieve an overall majority, but fail the requirement of a majority of states. It had the highest percentage approval of any unsuccessful referendum and the margin of failure in the fourth state, Western Australia, was 9,211 votes (1.53%). Charles Court, the Liberal Premier of Western Australia, Joh Bjelke-Petersen, the National Party Premier of Queensland, and Max Bingham, Leader of the Tasmanian Liberal Party (then in Opposition at the state level), campaigned against the referendum, largely causing its defeat in those three states.

This was the second unsuccessful referendum that sought to enable simultaneous elections of the House of Representatives and the Senate.

Simultaneous election results
Question	NSW	Vic	Qld	SA	WA	Tas	ACT (Note: Following the 1977 referendum, votes cast in the territories count towards the national total, but are not counted toward any state total.)	NT	States in favour	Voters in favour	Result
(29) 1974 Simultaneous Elections	51.1%	49.2%	44.3%	47.1%	44.1%	41.4%	—N/a	—N/a	1:5	48.3%	Not carried
(33) 1977 Simultaneous Elections	70.7%	65.0%	47.5%	66.0%	48.5%	34.3%	—N/a	—N/a	3:3	62.2%	Not carried
(37) 1984 Terms of Senators	52.9%	53.2%	45.7%	50.0%	46.5%	39.3%	56.7%	51.9%	2:4	50.6%	Not carried
(39) 1988 Parliamentary Terms	31.7%	36.2%	35.2%	26.8%	30.7%	25.3%	43.6%	38.1%	0:6	32.9%	Not carried

== See also ==
- 1984 Australian referendum
- Referendums in Australia
- Politics of Australia
- History of Australia
