= 1974 Australian referendum =

The 1974 Australian referendum was held on 18 May 1974. It contained four referendum questions.

Results (Note: Handbook of the 44th Parliament (2014) "Part 5 - Referendums and Plebiscites - Referendum results". Parliamentary Library of Australia.)
Question	NSW	Vic	Qld	SA	WA	Tas	States in favour	Voters in favour	Result
(29) Simultaneous Elections	51.06	49.19	44.32	47.14	44.07	41.37	1:5	48.3%	Not carried
(30) Mode of Altering the Constitution	51.35	49.22	44.29	44.26	42.53	40.72	1:5	48.0%	Not carried
(31) Democratic Elections	50.55	47.71	43.70	44.11	42.86	40.81	1:5	47.2%	Not carried
(32) Local Government Bodies	50.79	47.38	43.68	42.52	40.67	40.03	1:5	46.9%	Not carried

The referendum was held in conjunction with the 1974 federal election.

== Results in detail ==
=== Simultaneous Elections ===
Result
State	Electoral roll	Ballots issued	For		Against		Informal
State	Electoral roll	Ballots issued	Vote	%	Vote	%	Informal
New South Wales	2,834,558	2,702,903	1,359,485	51.06	1,303,117	48.94	40,301
Victoria	2,161,474	2,070,893	1,001,111	49.19	1,033,969	50.81	35,813
Queensland	1,154,762	1,098,401	481,092	44.32	604,444	55.68	12,865
South Australia	750,308	722,434	332,369	47.14	372,666	52.86	17,399
Western Australia	612,016	577,989	248,860	44.07	315,786	55.93	13,343
Tasmania	246,596	237,891	96,793	41.37	137,156	58.63	3,942
Total for Commonwealth	7,759,714	7,410,511	3,519,710	48.30	3,767,138	51.70	123,663
Results	Obtained majority in one state and an overall minority of 247,428 votes. Not carried						

This section is an excerpt from 1974 Australian referendum (Simultaneous Elections) § Results

=== Mode of Altering the Constitution ===
Result
State	Electoral roll	Ballots issued	For		Against		Informal
State	Electoral roll	Ballots issued	Vote	%	Vote	%	Informal
New South Wales	2,834,558	2,702,903	1,367,476	51.35	1,295,621	48.65	39,806
Victoria	2,161,474	2,070,893	1,001,753	49.22	1,033,486	50.78	35,654
Queensland	1,154,762	1,098,401	480,926	44.29	604,816	55.71	12,659
South Australia	750,308	722,434	311,954	44.26	392,891	55.74	17,589
Western Australia	612,016	577,989	240,134	42.53	324,435	57.47	13,420
Tasmania	246,596	237,891	95,264	40.72	138,674	59.28	3,953
Total for Commonwealth	7,759,714	7,410,511	3,497,507	47.99	3,789,923	52.01	123,081
Results	Obtained majority in one state and an overall minority of 292,416 votes. Not carried						

This section is an excerpt from 1974 Australian referendum (Mode of Altering the Constitution) § Results

=== Democratic Elections ===
Result
State	Electoral roll	Ballots issued	For		Against		Informal
State	Electoral roll	Ballots issued	Vote	%	Vote	%	Informal
New South Wales	2,835,558	2,702,903	1,345,983	50.55	1,316,837	49.45	40,083
Victoria	2,161,474	2,070,893	970,903	47.71	1,064,023	52.29	35,967
Queensland	1,154,762	1,098,401	474,337	43.70	611,135	56.30	12,929
South Australia	750,308	722,434	310,839	44.11	393,857	55.89	17,738
Western Australia	612,016	577,989	241,946	42.86	322,587	57.14	13,456
Tasmania	246,596	237,891	95,463	40.81	138,430	59.19	3,998
Total for Commonwealth	7,760,714	7,410,511	3,439,471	47.20	3,846,869	52.80	124,171
Results	Obtained majority in one state and an overall minority of 407,398 votes. Not carried						

This section is an excerpt from 1974 Australian referendum (Democratic Elections) § Results

=== Local Government Bodies ===
Result
State	Electoral roll	Ballots issued	For		Against		Informal
State	Electoral roll	Ballots issued	Vote	%	Vote	%	Informal
New South Wales	2,834,558	2,702,903	1,350,274	50.79	1,308,039	49.21	44,590
Victoria	2,161,474	2,070,893	961,664	47.38	1,068,120	52.62	41,109
Queensland	1,154,762	1,098,401	473,465	43.68	610,537	56.32	14,399
South Australia	750,308	722,434	298,489	42.52	403,479	57.48	20,466
Western Australia	612,016	577,989	229,337	40.67	334,529	59.33	14,123
Tasmania	246,596	237,891	93,495	40.03	140,073	59.97	4,323
Total for Commonwealth	7,759,714	7,410,511	3,406,724	46.85	3,864,777	53.15	139,010
Results	Obtained majority in one state and an overall minority of 458,053 votes. Not carried						

This section is an excerpt from 1974 Australian referendum (Local Government Bodies) § Results

== See also ==
- Referendums in Australia
- Politics of Australia
- History of Australia
