= 1974 Australian referendum (Democratic Elections) =

Australian Democratic Elections referendum, 1974
- 18 May 1974
- An Act to alter the Constitution so as to ensure that the members of the House of Representatives and of the parliaments of the states are chosen directly and democratically by the people. Do you approve the proposed law?

Results
Choice	Votes	%
Yes	3,439,471	47.20%
No	3,846,869	52.80%
Valid votes	7,286,340	98.32%
Invalid or blank votes	124,171	1.68%
Total votes	7,410,511	100.00%
Registered voters/turnout	7,759,714	95.5%

The Constitution Alteration (Democratic Elections) Bill 1974 was an unsuccessful proposal to alter the Australian Constitution to make population instead of electors, the basis of determining the average size of electorates in each state. It applied not only to the House of Representatives, but also to the various state Legislative Assemblies, requiring the use demographical population size to ensure democratic elections. This was intended to replace alternative methods of distributing seats, such as geographical size, with instead the population of states and territories. It was put to voters for approval in a referendum held on 18 May 1974.

== Background ==
The referendum was held in conjunction to the 1974 Federal Election on 18 May 1974. After the rejection of 6 Bills by the Opposition-controlled Senate, a double dissolution election was called from the 1974 Federal Election. The incumbent Labor Party led by Prime Minister Gough Whitlam defeated the opposition Liberal-Country coalition led by Billy Snedden. While this was the case, the Liberal-Country Party Opposition retained control of the Senate. Prime Minister Gough Whitlam had been an active prime minister since his party's victory in the 1972 election, and his government enforced several socially progressive reforms and policies over its first term. However, Whitlam's government suffered through the 1973 oil crisis and the 1973-75 recession and received a hostile reception from the Coalition, with the last Senate election held in 1970.

The proposal represented goals by the Labor leadership to strengthen the representative democratic foundations of Australia's political system by enshrining proportional representation in Australia, also referred to as one vote, one value. It was intended to prevent the gerrymandering system then in place in Queensland (Bjelkemander), South Australia (Playmander) and Western Australia. These systems featured pro-rural electoral malapportionment

== Question ==
The 1974 Australian referendum (Democratic Elections) posed the question: “An Act to alter the Constitution so as to ensure that the members of the House of Representatives and of the parliaments of the states are chosen directly and democratically by the people. Do you approve the proposed law?”

== Results ==
Result (Note: Handbook of the 44th Parliament (2014) "Part 5 - Referendums and Plebiscites - Referendum results". Parliamentary Library of Australia.)
State	Electoral roll	Ballots issued	For		Against		Informal
State	Electoral roll	Ballots issued	Vote	%	Vote	%	Informal
New South Wales	2,835,558	2,702,903	1,345,983	50.55	1,316,837	49.45	40,083
Victoria	2,161,474	2,070,893	970,903	47.71	1,064,023	52.29	35,967
Queensland	1,154,762	1,098,401	474,337	43.70	611,135	56.30	12,929
South Australia	750,308	722,434	310,839	44.11	393,857	55.89	17,738
Western Australia	612,016	577,989	241,946	42.86	322,587	57.14	13,456
Tasmania	246,596	237,891	95,463	40.81	138,430	59.19	3,998
Total for Commonwealth	7,760,714	7,410,511	3,439,471	47.20	3,846,869	52.80	124,171
Results	Obtained majority in one state and an overall minority of 407,398 votes. Not carried						

== Public debate ==
There has been significant debate about the results of the 1974 Australian referendum and the implications of it being unsuccessful. The failure of the Democratic Elections referendum proposal to reach a double majority raised questions about the strength of democracy in Australia’s parliamentary and electoral systems.

The proposal to enable people rather than geographic size as the determinant for the size of electorates was a goal to increase democratic processes. While the 1974 voter turnout did not indicate a lack of desire for an effective democratic design for electoral systems, it raised debate about democratic satisfaction in Australia. The series of four questions in the 1974 Australian referendum also sparked scholarly discussions about voter volatility and uncertainty in referendum voting behaviour, unlike in elections.

The view that political information is limited during referendum processes has been supported by various political scholars. The lack of information and resources available preceding referendums have been discussed by political scholars as contributing to lower percentage of voter approval. McGrath (2012) and DeLuc (2020) discuss the manner in which referendums receive limited media coverage and are less politicised, resulting in a limited dialogue about the subject of referendums and the implications of the possibility of a majority vote and or an uncarried referendum. There are views that limited media coverage and the depoliticised nature of referendums has led to poor voter knowledge, and that this can create a reluctance to vote, and to vote intentionally.

This was the first unsuccessful referendum that sought to enshrine proportional representation in Australia and prevent gerrymandering by the use of electoral malapportionment.

Proportional representation results
Question	NSW	Vic	Qld	SA	WA	Tas	ACT	NT	States in favour	Voters in favour	Result
(31) Democratic Elections	50.5%	47.7%	43.7%	44.1%	42.9%	40.8%	—N/a	—N/a	1:5	47.2%	Not carried
(40) 1988 Fair elections	35.6%	40.1%	44.8%	30.6%	32.0%	28.9%	52.0%	43.0%	0:6	37.6%	Not carried
