= Chapter VIII of the Constitution of Australia =

Chapter of the Australian Constitution establishing process for amendment by referendum

Chapter VIII of the Constitution of Australia contains only section 128, which describes the constitutional referendum process required for amending the Constitution.

The amendment by referendum method described in the section was modelled on provisions in the Swiss Federal Constitution. Its inclusion was influenced also by the Swiss method being present in the constitutions of several U.S. states at the time of federation.

== Summary ==
Section 128 stipulates that the constitution may only be amended by referendum, and describes the referendum process.

=== The process ===
A bill containing the change must be passed by the Commonwealth parliament. This bill must be passed by an absolute majority in both houses. If one house passes the bill containing the proposed change while the other refuses, it may attempt to pass the bill again. If the second house again refuses to pass it, the Governor-General may still submit the proposed change for referendum.

The proposed change must then be submitted to Australian electors for approval. That referendum must occur at least two months after the bill has passed, and at most six months after. Parliament may make laws setting out the procedures for the referendum (e.g. in the Referendum (Machinery Provisions) Act 1984), although all people eligible to vote for the House of Representatives are expressly eligible to vote in referendums by force of s128.

A referendum will succeed if double majority is achieved. This consists of (1) a majority being carried among electors in a majority of states, and (2) a majority of electors nationally (including territories).

An additional requirement is that any state specifically affected by an amendment must be one of the states with a majority among electors. This additional requirement applies when a change would reduce a state's representation in either house of parliament, alter state boundaries, or otherwise alter constitutional provisions specifically in relation to that state.

=== Obsolete suffrage rule ===
Section 128 makes allowance for inconsistent suffrage rights across the colonies at federation. It provides that any state providing women with the vote shall have only half the votes in that state counted for the referendum. As Australia's voting laws and suffrage rules are now uniform, this provision is obsolete.

== Amendments ==
Section 128 was amended in the 1977 referendum, allowing for the participation of electors in the territories. Electors in territories which can be represented in the House of Representatives (currently the Northern Territory and the Australian Capital Territory) are counted in determining whether a majority of all electors in Australia approve a change. Electors resident in other territories (called external territories) are able to vote in referendums (as in elections) as voters registered in the Northern Territory or in a state.

There was an unsuccessful attempt to amend the section in 1974, which would have altered the section so that if an equal number of states approved and disapproved of a change; the result would be determined by national majority. That unsuccessful referendum also attempted to allow for voting of those in the territories during elections; an issue addressed in the 1977 referendum.

The Hawke government's Constitutional Commission recommended in its final report that the section be altered to allow for State Parliaments to initiate referendums by passing bills containing proposed changes. Under the proposal, if at least half the states passed bills containing the same amendment within a 12-month period, the Governor-General would be obliged to put the proposal to referendum. The Commission also recommended against the introduction of an elector's initiative system, (as used by Switzerland and several US States) reasoning that it would be at odds with the Australian traditions of responsible government and representative government.
