= 1974 Australian referendum (Mode of Altering the Constitution) =

1974 Australian "Mode of Altering the Constitution" referendum
- 18 May 1974
- An Act to facilitate alterations to the Constitution and to allow electors in territories, as well as electors in the states, to vote at referendums on proposed laws to alter the Constitution. Do you approve the proposed law?

Results
Choice	Votes	%
Yes	3,497,507	47.99%
No	3,789,923	52.01%
Valid votes	7,287,430	98.34%
Invalid or blank votes	123,081	1.66%
Total votes	7,410,511	100.00%
Registered voters/turnout	7,759,714	95.5%

The Constitution Alteration (Mode of Altering the Constitution) Bill 1974, was an unsuccessful proposal to alter the Australian Constitution to make it easier to amend the constitution and give voters in the Australian territories the right to vote in referendums. It was put to voters for approval in a referendum held on 18 May 1974.

The bill to amend the constitution was passed by the House of Representatives however it was rejected by the Senate. Instead the referendum was put to voters using the deadlock provision in Section 128. Since federation, voters in territories had been excluded from voting in referendums. The proposal would have meant that their votes counted towards the national majority, but not towards any state total.

== Question ==
Proposed law entitled "An Act to facilitate alterations to the Constitution and to allow electors in territories, as well as electors in the states, to vote at referendums on proposed laws to alter the Constitution".

Do you approve the proposed law?

== Results ==
Result (Note: Handbook of the 44th Parliament (2014) "Part 5 - Referendums and Plebiscites - Referendum results". Parliamentary Library of Australia.)
State	Electoral roll	Ballots issued	For		Against		Informal
State	Electoral roll	Ballots issued	Vote	%	Vote	%	Informal
New South Wales	2,834,558	2,702,903	1,367,476	51.35	1,295,621	48.65	39,806
Victoria	2,161,474	2,070,893	1,001,753	49.22	1,033,486	50.78	35,654
Queensland	1,154,762	1,098,401	480,926	44.29	604,816	55.71	12,659
South Australia	750,308	722,434	311,954	44.26	392,891	55.74	17,589
Western Australia	612,016	577,989	240,134	42.53	324,435	57.47	13,420
Tasmania	246,596	237,891	95,264	40.72	138,674	59.28	3,953
Total for Commonwealth	7,759,714	7,410,511	3,497,507	47.99	3,789,923	52.01	123,081
Results	Obtained majority in one state and an overall minority of 292,416 votes. Not carried						

== Proposed changes to the text of the constitution ==
The proposal was to alter the constitution as follows (removed text stricken through; substituted text in bold):

Section 128
The proposed law for the alteration thereof must be passed by an absolute majority of each House of the Parliament, and not less than two nor more than six months after its passage through both Houses the proposed law shall be submitted ~~in each State~~ to the electors qualified to vote for the election of members of the House of Representatives.

But if either House passes any such proposed law by an absolute majority, and the other House rejects or fails to pass it, or passes it with any amendment to which the first‑mentioned House will not agree, and if after an interval of three months the first‑mentioned House in the same or the next session again passes the proposed law by an absolute majority with or without any amendment which has been made or agreed to by the other House, and such other House rejects or fails to pass it or passes it with any amendment to which the first‑mentioned House will not agree, the Governor‑General may submit the proposed law as last proposed by the first‑mentioned House, and either with or without any amendments subsequently agreed to by both Houses, to the electors ~~in each State~~ qualified to vote for the election of the House of Representatives.

When a proposed law is submitted to the electors the vote shall be taken in such manner as the Parliament prescribes. But until the qualification of electors of members of the House of Representatives becomes uniform throughout the Commonwealth, only one‑half the electors voting for and against the proposed law shall be counted in any State in which adult suffrage prevails.

And if ~~in a majority of the States~~ in not less than one-half of the States a majority of the electors voting approve the proposed law, and if a majority of all the electors voting also approve the proposed law, it shall be presented to the Governor‑General for the Queen’s assent.

No alteration diminishing the proportionate representation of any State in either House of the Parliament, or the minimum number of representatives of a State in the House of Representatives, or increasing, diminishing, or otherwise altering the limits of the State, or in any manner affecting the provisions of the Constitution in relation thereto, shall become law unless the majority of the electors voting in that State approve the proposed law.

== Discussion ==
This referendum attempted to alter the way in which the results of referendum questions would be tallied. The votes of residents of territories was to be included in the national totals for deciding national majority and a majority of voters in only three of the six states would need to vote 'yes', rather than four out of six as in previous referendums.

Prior to this referendum, there were three referendum questions in which a majority of voters nationwide and the majority of voters in fewer than four states voted 'yes', which resulted in rejection of these questions. Had this modification been in place, two out of three of these questions would have carried. Additionally, in the two instances following this referendum where a majority of voters nationwide and the majority of voters in fewer than four states voted 'yes', only one of these outcomes would have been changed had this modification been in place.

A similar question without the modification to the double majority rule was put to referendum in 1977 Australian referendum (Referendums), and was carried strongly. Given this, and examining the results of this question it can be inferred that the states with small populations were unwilling to give up their power for the sake of giving votes to territorians.
