= 1988 Australian referendum (Local Government) =

Unsuccessful constitutional proposal

1988 Australian Local Government referendum
3 September 1988
- A Proposed Law: To alter the Constitution to recognise local government. Do you approve of this proposed alteration?
- Outcome: Not carried, A majority "no" vote nationally and in all six states.

Results
Choice	Votes	%
Yes	3,163,488	33.61%
No	6,248,166	66.39%
Valid votes	9,411,654	98.68%
Invalid or blank votes	126,071	1.32%
Total votes	9,537,725	100.00%
Registered voters/turnout	10,362,959	92.04%
- Results by federal electoral division
- Note: Saturation of colour denotes strength of vote

The Constitution Alteration (Local Government) Bill 1988, was an unsuccessful proposal to alter the Australian Constitution to require that the states maintain a system of democratically elected local government. The amendment would have prevented states from abolishing their local governments or removing elections for them entirely if they so chose to do. It was put to voters for approval in a referendum held on 3 September 1988.

The structure of the Constitution primarily deals with the federal level and its relationship with the states, and therefore leaves the issue of local government to the states. The failure of this did not make local government unconstitutional, state parliaments are still free to establish systems of local governments through legislation under section 107 of the Federal Constitution. Each state has provided for constitutional recognition in its respective state constitution.

The "no" campaign in 1988 argued that this change would undermine states' rights, i.e. that it would move – or make it possible to move – some power from state governments to local governments.

== Question ==
A Proposed Law: To alter the Constitution to recognise local government.

Do you approve this proposed alteration?

== Proposed Changes to the Constitution ==
The proposal was to add a new provision to the Constitution as follows (substituted text in bold):

119A. Each State shall provide for the establishment and continuance of a system of local government, with local government bodies elected in accordance with the laws of the State and empowered to administer, and to make by-laws for, their respective areas in accordance with the laws of the State.

== Results ==
Result (Note: Handbook of the 44th Parliament (2014) "Part 5 - Referendums and Plebiscites - Referendum results". Parliamentary Library of Australia.)
State	Electoral roll	Ballots issued	For		Against		Informal
State	Electoral roll	Ballots issued	Vote	%	Vote	%	Informal
New South Wales	3,564,856	3,297,246	1,033,364	31.70	2,226,529	68.30	37,353
Victoria	2,697,096	2,491,183	882,020	36.06	1,563,957	63.94	45,206
Queensland	1,693,247	1,552,293	590,868	38.31	951,332	61.69	10,093
South Australia	937,974	873,511	256,421	29.85	602,499	70.15	14,591
Western Australia	926,636	845,209	247,830	29.76	584,863	70.24	12,516
Tasmania	302,324	282,785	76,707	27.50	202,214	72.50	3,864
Australian Capital Territory (Note: Following the 1977 referendum, votes cast in the territories count towards the national total, but are not counted toward any state total.)	166,131	149,128	58,755	39.78	88,945	**60.22**	1,428
Northern Territory	74,695	56,370	21,449	38.80	33,826	**61.20**	1,095
Total for Commonwealth	10,362,959	9,537,725	3,163,488	33.61	6,248,166	66.39	126,071
Results	Obtained a majority in no state and an overall minority of 2,335,741 votes. **Not carried**						

== Discussion ==
This was the second unsuccessful referendum on the subject of Local Government. The 1974 referendum on Local Government Bodies sought to allow the Commonwealth to grant financial assistance to local government bodies, and to borrow money on their behalf.

== See also ==
- 1988 Australian referendum
- Referendums in Australia
- Politics of Australia
- History of Australia
