= 1974 Australian referendum (Local Government Bodies) =

1974 Australian Local Government Bodies referendum
- 18 May 1974
- An Act to alter the Constitution to enable the Commonwealth to borrow money for, and to grant financial assistance to, local government bodies Do you approve the proposed law?

Results
Choice	Votes	%
Yes	3,406,724	46.85%
No	3,864,777	53.15%
Valid votes	7,271,501	98.12%
Invalid or blank votes	139,010	1.88%
Total votes	7,410,511	100.00%
Registered voters/turnout	7,759,714	95.5%

The Constitution Alteration (Local Government Bodies) Bill 1974 was an unsuccessful proposal to alter the Commonwealth of Australia Constitution Act 1901 as Proclaimed and Gazetted to allow the Commonwealth to grant financial assistance to local government bodies, and to borrow money on their behalf. It was put to voters for approval in a referendum held on 18 May 1974.

== Question ==
Proposed law entitled "An Act to alter the Constitution to enable the Commonwealth to borrow money for, and to grant financial assistance to, local government bodies".

Do you approve the proposed law?

The proposal was to insert into section 51 that the Parliament have power to make laws with respect to:

(ivA.) The borrowing of money by the Commonwealth for local government bodies

And to add a new section 96A

96A. The Parliament may grant financial assistance to any local government body on such terms and conditions as the Parliament thinks fit.

== Results ==
Result (Note: Handbook of the 44th Parliament (2014) "Part 5 - Referendums and Plebiscites - Referendum results". Parliamentary Library of Australia.)
State	Electoral roll	Ballots issued	For		Against		Informal
State	Electoral roll	Ballots issued	Vote	%	Vote	%	Informal
New South Wales	2,834,558	2,702,903	1,350,274	50.79	1,308,039	49.21	44,590
Victoria	2,161,474	2,070,893	961,664	47.38	1,068,120	52.62	41,109
Queensland	1,154,762	1,098,401	473,465	43.68	610,537	56.32	14,399
South Australia	750,308	722,434	298,489	42.52	403,479	57.48	20,466
Western Australia	612,016	577,989	229,337	40.67	334,529	59.33	14,123
Tasmania	246,596	237,891	93,495	40.03	140,073	59.97	4,323
Total for Commonwealth	7,759,714	7,410,511	3,406,724	46.85	3,864,777	53.15	139,010
Results	Obtained majority in one state and an overall minority of 458,053 votes. Not carried						

== See also ==
- Politics of Australia
- History of Australia
