= Bjelkemander =

Form of malapportionment once used in Queensland, Australia

The Bjelkemander was the term given to a system of malapportionment in the Australian state of Queensland in the 1970s and 1980s. Under the system, electorates were allocated to zones such as rural or metropolitan and electoral boundaries drawn so that rural electorates had about half as many voters each as metropolitan ones. The Country Party (later National Party), a rural-based party led by Joh Bjelke-Petersen, was able to govern uninhibited during this period due to the 'Bjelkemander' and the absence of an upper house of Parliament.

== Origin of term ==
The term is a portmanteau of Joh Bjelke-Petersen's surname with the word "Gerrymander", where electoral boundaries are redrawn in an unnatural way with the dominant intention of favouring one political party or grouping over its rivals. Although Bjelke-Petersen's 1972 redistributions occasionally had elements of "gerrymandering" in the strict sense, their perceived unfairness had more to do with malapportionment whereby certain areas (normally rural) are simply granted more representation than their population would dictate if electorates contained equal numbers of voters (or population).

== Electoral system under Bjelke-Petersen ==
When the Country (later National) Party first won power in 1957, under Bjelke-Petersen's predecessor, Frank Nicklin, it inherited a system of malapportionment from the previous Labor Party government. After becoming premier, Nicklin reworked that set-up to benefit the Country and Liberal parties instead. The Labor-leaning provincial cities were split off from their hinterlands, in which new Country Party seats were created. At the same time, more Liberal seats were created in the Brisbane area. This slanted the system toward the Coalition.

Bjelke-Petersen tweaked that system even further after becoming premier, benefiting his own Country Party at the expense of both the Labor and Liberal parties. That meant that in Queensland, unlike at the federal level and in the other states, the Country/National Party was the senior partner in the non-Labor coalition, with the Liberals as junior partner. In fact, Bjelke-Petersen's system discriminated against the Liberals as much, if not more, than the Labor Party. As a party drawing its votes mainly from the Brisbane area, the Liberals were regarded by Bjelke-Petersen as "small-l-liberal" and averse to rural interests. When he became premier in 1968, the Liberals held only slightly fewer seats than the Country Party, providing further incentive for the Country Party to increase its parliamentary numbers at the expense of the Liberals.

== History ==
From 1910 to 1949, Queensland had a "one person, one vote, one value" electoral system, with a maximum variation of 30% from the Statewide average quota. But in 1949 the Labor Party conducted a revision which varied the number of voters in each electorate according to their size and distance from Brisbane, the state capital in the far south-east of the huge state. Although difficulties in transport and communication were given as the reasons to reduce the size of remote and thinly-populated electorates, the effect was to give a huge advantage to the Labor Party, which at that time drew its voting strength from rural areas, a consequence of the party's formation in the outback Queensland town of Barcaldine half a century earlier.

The newly elected Country Party MP for Nanango, Joh Bjelke-Petersen, spoke out against the redistribution, saying that it meant that "the majority will be ruled by the minority" and that the Labor government was telling the people "whether you like it or not, we will be the Government".

The 1957 ALP split, in which Labor Premier Vince Gair led many MPs out of the party to form the Queensland Labor Party (QLP), undermined the advantage of the malapportionment to Labor. Since the boundaries were drawn to take advantage of the ALP's rural supporters (farm workers, miners etc.) the rural-based Country Party was able to take the most advantage from Labor's infighting.

In 1971, Bjelke-Petersen, who had become Premier in 1968, proposed to refine the malapportionment to favour his party at the expense of his Coalition partners, the Liberal Party, as well as Labor. Electoral demographics had changed since 1949 and Labor now drew most of its support from urban concentrations of workers. Labor opposed the scheme, as did enough of the Liberals to defeat the bill in Parliament. However, Bjelke-Petersen worked during a four-month Parliamentary recess to redraft the scheme just enough to ensure the support of the Liberals. The new map was used as the basis for the May 1972 election, from which Bjelke-Petersen emerged victorious as Premier despite only receiving 20% of the vote, a smaller percentage than the Liberals (22.2%) or Labor (46.7%). But due to the Country Party's heavy concentration of support in the rural and remote zones, it won 26 seats. Combined with the Liberals' 21 seats, this gave the Coalition 47 seats to Labor's 33, consigning Labor to opposition even though it won far more actual votes.

In 1977 another redistribution eliminated some Liberal seats, reducing the internal threat to the Country Party (now renamed the National Party) from its coalition partner.

== Electoral effect ==
The putative reasons given for reducing the number of voters in remote and rural electorates have some validity: in 1949, the electorate of Gregory was larger in area than Great Britain, but contained fewer than 6000 voters. In addition, it contained vast areas of desert and the few communities in the electorate were poorly served by road and rail links. Other electorates were almost as large: in fact, the four electorates of Gregory, Cook, Flinders and Mount Isa together comprised nearly two-thirds of Queensland's entire landmass. The difficulties of keeping in touch with the population over such enormous and diverse regions were cited by Labor in 1949, and the Country Party in 1971, as reasons for malapportionment.

At the 1956 election, the change from the previous one vote-one value system was dramatic: the Brisbane-area seat of Mount Gravatt had 26307 voters, while the seat of Charters Towers in far northern Queensland had just 4367, a ratio of six to one.

If the number of votes cast per party is divided by the number of seats won, the effect on party representation is underscored. In 1956 the Labor Party needed 7000 votes to win each seat, the Country Party 9900, and the Liberals 23800.

By 1972, the disparity in electorate sizes had reduced, with Pine Rivers (16758 voters) and Gregory (6723) marking the extremes. However, the effect was that Bjelke-Petersen was retained as Premier of the state on just 20% of the primary vote. The following table shows the figures for the 1972 election:

Party	Votes cast	% of votes	Seats won	% of seats
Labor	424,002	46.7	33	40.2
Liberal	201,596	22.2	21	25
Country	181,404	20.0	26	31.1
DLP	69,757	7.7	0	0
Independent	30,187	3.3	2	2.4
Total	906,946	100.0	82	100.0

The Labor Party won 33 seats, the largest of any single party; however, since the National/Liberal Coalition had won 47 seats between them, Labor was consigned to Opposition despite winning almost 41,000 more primary votes than the Coalition. Bjelke-Petersen's Country Party had 26 seats to the Liberals' 21; thus, as leader of the senior Coalition partner, Bjelke-Petersen stayed on as Premier.

It can also be seen from the above table that the DLP won 7.7% of the vote, but no seats at all: most of these votes flowed through preferential voting away from the Labor Party, further exacerbating the effect of the "Bjelkemander".

== Other factors ==
The malapportionment favouring country areas helped Labor in 1949 onwards and the Country Party from 1957. The 1972 redistribution introduced a gerrymander effect favouring the Country Party, by which boundaries were drawn to consolidate Labor-voting populations and diversify Country supporters. A seat won with 50.1% of the vote was just as good in Parliament as one with 100% support. Liberal and especially Labor voters were usually found in identifiable "clumps" within Brisbane and the regional cities, a reflection of the income levels available to workers and the middle class dividing them between desirable and less desirable suburbs.

The metropolis of Brisbane was a zone of limited support for Bjelke-Petersen's Country Party, but fertile ground was found in the regional centres where Labor populations could be aggregated together and the rural voters of the surrounding districts distributed to electorates where they would be of most use to the Country Party.

== End of the Bjelkemander ==
The resignation of Sir Joh Bjelke-Petersen in 1987, and the defeat of the National Party by Labor under Wayne Goss in 1989, led to the implementation of more equitable electoral boundaries, which was achieved by a redistribution in 1991 that took effect at the 1992 election.

Acting on the recommendations of the Electoral and Administrative Review Commission (EARC), the Goss Labor Government legislated for a compromise system which allocated 40 of the legislature's 89 seats to the Brisbane area, or 45% of the legislature. Most seats had roughly the same number of voters, while no seat's population could vary from the statewide average by more than 10%. However, an electorate of over 100,000 square km in area could be counted as having notional extra voters (dubbed "phantom voters" by the media) equal to 2% of its area in square kilometres. Only five of the 89 districts qualified for this special loading, but since these were (a) huge in area, and (b) not solidly National (for instance, Mount Isa and Cook have been regularly held by Labor since 1989), the retention of this small degree of rural vote-weighting was not any longer a matter of political controversy in Queensland.

In 2017, the Queensland Legislative Assembly was expanded to 93 seats, with Brisbane electing a majority of the Parliament for the first time since 1949.

== See also ==
- Australian electoral system#Gerrymandering and malapportionment
- Playmander, a similar malapportionment in South Australia, named after Thomas Playford IV. (1936-1968)
