= 1988 Australian referendum (Rights and Freedoms) =

1988 Unsuccessful constitutional proposal in Australia

1988 Australian Rights and Freedoms referendum
- 3 September 1988
- A Proposed Law: To alter the Constitution to extend the right to trial by jury, to extend freedom of religion, and to ensure fair terms for persons whose property is acquired by any government. Do you approve of this proposed alteration?
- Outcome: Not carried, A majority "no" vote nationally and in all six states.

Results
Choice	Votes	%
Yes	2,892,828	30.79%
No	6,503,752	69.21%
Valid votes	9,396,580	98.52%
Invalid or blank votes	141,145	1.48%
Total votes	9,537,725	100.00%
Registered voters/turnout	10,362,959	92.04%
- Results by federal electoral division
- Note: Saturation of colour denotes strength of vote

The Constitution Alteration (Rights and Freedoms) Bill 1988, was an unsuccessful proposal to alter the Australian Constitution to enshrine various civil rights, namely freedom of religion, rights in relation to trials, and rights regarding the compulsory acquisition of property. It was put to voters for approval in a referendum held on 3 September 1988.

== Background ==
The constitution provides for 5 express rights, 3 which apply only to the Commonwealth, religious freedom, trial by jury, "just terms" compensation. The 2 rights which apply to all of Australia are free trade between the states, and protection against discrimination based on the state an individual lives in.

The yes case was that the existing protections were inadequate as the state and territory governments were not bound to observe the rights.

The no case was that the proposals threatened existing rights and freedoms and could threaten the future of state aid for independent schools.

=== Trial by jury ===
The proposals had been considered by an Advisory Committee to the Constitutional Commission which reported in 1987. There are various limitations to the right in section 80 of the Constitution to trial by jury. The High Court had held in 1915 that the requirement to trial by jury did not apply to the local laws of a territory. While this decision had been criticised by High Court judges in later cases, it had not been overturned. The proposal was to extend the right to every state and territory. The right only applies to trials for indictable offences, which is a procedural matter referring to the form of the charge being "on indictment". While indictable offences are generally more serious than those that are tried summarily, the settled position in the High Court was that the right to jury trials did not apply to all serious offences, but only those determined by the Parliament. The proposal was to set the right to trial by jury to the seriousness of the penalty that may be imposed.

=== Freedom of religion ===
The "religious freedom" part of the proposed change was opposed by many churches and religious-affiliated schools concerned that it would be interpreted as requiring a level of church-state separation that would put public funding and government assistance for faith schools in jeopardy.

Conversely, Liberal senator Richard Alston argued that the aforementioned provision could place the use of corporal punishment in religious schools beyond the power of the government to regulate.

=== Compulsory acquisition of property ===
Section 51 of the Constitution sets out specific powers of the Commonwealth, including for the acquisition of property. The founders viewed this as the express conferral of a power and not a civil liberties provision. Nonetheless it has come to be seen as one of the few express rights in the constitution.

== Question ==
A Proposed Law: To alter the Constitution to extend the right to trial by jury, to extend freedom of religion, and to ensure fair terms for persons whose property is acquired by any government.

Do you approve this proposed alteration?

== Proposed Changes to the Constitution ==
The proposal was to add a new provision to the Constitution as follows (removed text stricken through; substituted text in bold):

Section 80 Trial by jury
~~The trial on indictment of any offence against any law of the Commonwealth shall be by jury, and every such trial shall be held in the State where the offence was committed, and if the offence was not committed within any State the trial shall be held at such place or places as the Parliament prescribes.~~
(1) The trial of a person for an offence, where the accused is liable to imprisonment for more than two years or any form of corporal punishment, shall be by jury except in the case of a trial for contempt of court or a trial of a member of the Defence Force of the Commonwealth before a court-martial under a law relating to the discipline of the Defence Force of the Commonwealth.
(2) The trial by jury of an offence against a law of the Commonwealth that:

(a) was not committed in a State or Territory;
(b) was committed in two or more of the States and Territories; or
(c) was committed at a place or places unknown;
shall be held at such place or places as the Parliament prescribes.

(3) The trial by jury of any other offence against a law of the Commonwealth shall be held in the State or Territory where the offence was committed.
(4) At any time during a trial referred to in subsection (2) or (3), the court may, on application by the accused or the prosecution, transfer the trial to a court of competent jurisdiction in another State or Territory.
(5) Nothing in subsection (1) prevents the making, or affects the operation, of a law to the extent that the law:

(a) permits waiver by the accused of trial by jury;
(b) regulates the size or composition of the jury; or
(c) provides for majority verdicts.

115A Acquisition of property under State law.
A law of a State may not provide for the acquisition of property from any person except on just terms.

115B Acquisition of property in Territories.
A law made under section one hundred and twenty-two or a law of a Territory may not provide for the acquisition of property from any person except on just terms.

Section 116 ~~Commonwealth not to legislate in respect of religion~~ No establishment etc. of religion
The Commonwealth, a State or a Territory shall not ~~make any law for establishing~~ establish any religion, ~~or for imposing~~ impose any religious observance~~, or for prohibiting~~ or prohibit the free exercise of any religion, and no religious test shall be required as a qualification for any office or public trust under the Commonwealth, a State or a Territory.

== Results ==
Result (Note: Handbook of the 44th Parliament (2014) "Part 5 - Referendums and Plebiscites - Referendum results". Parliamentary Library of Australia.)
State	Electoral roll	Ballots issued	For		Against		Informal
State	Electoral roll	Ballots issued	Vote	%	Vote	%	Informal
New South Wales	3,564,856	3,297,246	965,045	29.65	2,289,645	70.35	42,556
Victoria	2,697,096	2,491,183	816,057	33.42	1,625,484	66.58	49,642
Queensland	1,693,247	1,552,293	506,710	32.90	1,033,645	67.10	11,938
South Australia	937,974	873,511	223,038	26.01	634,438	73.99	16,035
Western Australia	926,636	845,209	233,917	28.14	597,322	71.86	13,970
Tasmania	302,324	282,785	70,987	25.49	207,486	74.51	4,312
Australian Capital Territory (Note: Following the 1977 referendum, votes cast in the territories count towards the national total, but are not counted toward any state total.)	166,131	149,128	60,064	40.71	87,460	59.29	1,604
Northern Territory	74,695	56,370	20,503	37.14	34,699	62.86	1,168
Total for Commonwealth	10,362,959	9,537,725	2,892,828	30.79	6,503,752	69.21	141,145
Results	Obtained a majority in no state and an overall minority of 3,610,924 votes. Not carried						

== See also ==
- 1988 Australian referendum
- Referendums in Australia
- Politics of Australia
- History of Australia
