= 1984 Australian referendum =

A referendum was held in Australia on 1 December 1984. It contained two referendum questions, neither of which passed. As of 2022, this is the last referendum in which any state voted in favour of a constitutional amendment.

Result (Note: Handbook of the 44th Parliament (2014) "Part 5 - Referendums and Plebiscites - Referendum results". Parliamentary Library of Australia.)
Question	NSW	Vic	Qld	SA	WA	Tas	ACT	NT	States in favour	Voters in favour	Result
(37) Terms of Senators	Yes	Yes	No	No	No	No	Yes	Yes	2:4	51%	Not carried
(38) Interchange of Powers	No	No	No	No	No	No	Yes	No	0:6	47%	Not carried

The referendum was held in conjunction with the 1984 federal election.

== Results in detail ==
=== Terms of Senators ===
This section is an excerpt from 1984 Australian referendum (Terms of Senators) § Results

Result
State	Electoral roll	Ballots issued	For		Against		Informal
State	Electoral roll	Ballots issued	Vote	%	Vote	%	Informal
New South Wales	3,423,624	3,216,256	1,621,894	52.86	1,446,150	47.14	148,212
Victoria	2,617,291	2,475,891	1,244,451	53.20	1,094,760	46.80	136,680
Queensland	1,549,749	1,447,284	642,768	45.65	765,329	54.35	39,187
South Australia	908,424	856,226	398,127	49.98	398,463	50.02	59,636
Western Australia	858,763	806,637	358,502	46.47	412,996	53.53	35,139
Tasmania	289,142	277,100	102,762	39.29	158,777	60.71	15,561
Australian Capital Territory	150,416	140,982	76,901	56.68	58,764	43.32	5,317
Northern Territory	68,857	58,668	28,310	51.87	26,265	48.13	4,093
Total for Commonwealth	9,866,266	9,279,044	4,473,715	50.64	4,361,504	49.36	443,825
Results	Obtained a majority in two states and an overall majority of 112,211 votes. Not carried						

=== Interchange of Powers ===
This section is an excerpt from 1984 Australian referendum (Interchange of Powers) § Results

Result
State	Electoral roll	Ballots issued	For		Against		Informal
State	Electoral roll	Ballots issued	Vote	%	Vote	%	Informal
New South Wales	3,423,624	3,216,256	1,475,971	49.04	1,533,799	50.96	206,486
Victoria	2,617,291	2,475,891	1,139,565	49.86	1,146,136	50.14	190,190
Queensland	1,549,749	1,447,284	578,674	41.69	809,249	58.31	59,361
South Australia	908,424	856,226	355,588	45.94	418,433	54.06	82,205
Western Australia	858,763	806,637	336,184	44.28	423,022	55.72	47,431
Tasmania	289,142	277,100	87,933	34.65	165,878	65.35	23,289
Australian Capital Territory	150,416	140,982	74,741	56.10	58,487	43.90	7,754
Northern Territory	68,857	58,668	25,684	47.78	28,066	52.22	4,918
Total for Commonwealth	9,866,266	9,279,044	4,074,340	47.06	4,583,070	52.94	621,634
Results	Obtained a majority in no state and an overall minority of 508,730 votes. Not carried						

== See also ==
- Referendums in Australia
- Politics of Australia
- History of Australia
