= 1984 Australian referendum (Interchange of Powers) =

- 1 December 1984
- An Act to enable the Commonwealth and the states voluntarily to refer powers to each other. Do you approve of this proposed alteration?
- Outcome: Not carried, A majority "no" vote nationally and in all six states.

Results
Choice	Votes	%
Yes	4,074,340	47.06%
No	4,583,070	52.94%
Valid votes	8,657,410	93.30%
Invalid or blank votes	621,634	6.70%
Total votes	9,279,044	100.00%
Registered voters/turnout	9,866,266	94.05%
- Results by federal electoral division
- Note: Saturation of colour denotes strength of vote

The Constitution Alteration (Interchange of Powers) Bill 1984, was an unsuccessful proposal to alter the Australian Constitution so that the states and the federal government could freely interchange powers at will. It was put to voters for approval in a referendum held on 1 December 1984.

== Question ==
An Act to enable the Commonwealth and the States voluntarily to refer powers to each other.

Do you approve this proposed alteration?

== Results ==
Result (Note: Handbook of the 44th Parliament (2014) "Part 5 - Referendums and Plebiscites - Referendum results". Parliamentary Library of Australia.)
State	Electoral roll	Ballots issued	For		Against		Informal
State	Electoral roll	Ballots issued	Vote	%	Vote	%	Informal
New South Wales	3,423,624	3,216,256	1,475,971	49.04	1,533,799	50.96	206,486
Victoria	2,617,291	2,475,891	1,139,565	49.86	1,146,136	50.14	190,190
Queensland	1,549,749	1,447,284	578,674	41.69	809,249	58.31	59,361
South Australia	908,424	856,226	355,588	45.94	418,433	54.06	82,205
Western Australia	858,763	806,637	336,184	44.28	423,022	55.72	47,431
Tasmania	289,142	277,100	87,933	34.65	165,878	65.35	23,289
Australian Capital Territory	150,416	140,982	74,741	56.10	58,487	43.90	7,754
Northern Territory	68,857	58,668	25,684	47.78	28,066	52.22	4,918
Total for Commonwealth	9,866,266	9,279,044	4,074,340	47.06	4,583,070	52.94	621,634
Results	Obtained a majority in no state and an overall minority of 508,730 votes. Not carried						

== See also ==
- 1984 Australian referendum
- Referendums in Australia
- Politics of Australia
- History of Australia
