= 1988 Australian referendum (Parliamentary Terms) =

Unsuccessful referendum

1988 Australian Parliamentary Terms referendum
- 3 September 1988
- A Proposed Law: To alter the Constitution to provide for 4 year maximum terms for members of both Houses of the Commonwealth Parliament. Do you approve of this proposed alteration?
- Outcome: Not carried, A majority "no" vote nationally and in all six states.

Results
Choice	Votes	%
Yes	3,099,270	32.91%
No	6,316,940	67.09%
Valid votes	9,416,210	98.73%
Invalid or blank votes	121,515	1.27%
Total votes	9,537,725	100.00%
Registered voters/turnout	10,362,959	92.04%
- Results by federal electoral division
- Note: Saturation of colour denotes strength of vote

The Constitution Alteration (Parliamentary Terms) 1988 was an unsuccessful proposal put to referendum in the 1988 Australian referendum on 3 September 1988. It proposed to alter the Australian constitution so that both the House of Representatives and the Senate would be elected for a term of four years. This involved reducing the terms of the Senate from six years to four years, and increasing the terms of the House of Representatives from three years to four years. It also proposed for the fourth time that Senate and House elections occur simultaneously.

== Question ==
A Proposed Law: To alter the Constitution to provide for 4 year maximum terms for members of both Houses of the Commonwealth Parliament.

Do you approve this proposed alteration?

== Proposed Changes to the Constitution ==
The proposal was to alter sections of the Constitution to read as follows:

7. The Senate

The Senate shall be composed of senators for each State, directly chosen by the people of the State, voting, until the Parliament otherwise provides, as one electorate.
But until the Parliament of the Commonwealth otherwise provides, the Parliament of the State of Queensland, if that State be an Original State, may make laws dividing the State into divisions and determining the number of senators to be chosen for each division, and in the absence of such provision the State shall be one electorate.
Until the Parliament otherwise provides there shall be six senators for each Original State. The Parliament may make laws increasing or diminishing the number of senators for each State, but so that equal representation of the several Original States shall be maintained and that no Original State shall have less than six senators.
The ~~senators shall be chosen for a term of six years, and the~~ names of the senators chosen for each State shall be certified by the Governor to the Governor-General.

9. Method of election of senators

The Parliament of the Commonwealth may make laws prescribing the method of choosing senators, but so that the method shall be uniform for all the States. Subject to any such law, the Parliament of each State may make laws prescribing the method of choosing the senators for that State.
~~Times and places~~

~~The Parliament of a State may make laws for determining the times and places of elections of senators for the State.~~

12. Issue of writs

The Governor of any State may cause writs to be issued for elections of senators for the State. ~~In case of the dissolution of the Senate the writs shall be issued within ten days from the proclamation of such dissolution.~~ The writs shall be issued within ten days from the expiry of a House of Representatives or from the proclamation of a dissolution thereof, but so that the polling day shall be the same day as the polling day for the election of members of the House of Representatives.

~~13. Rotation of senators~~

~~As soon as may be after the Senate first meets, and after each first meeting of the Senate following a dissolution thereof, the Senate shall divide the senators chosen for each State into two classes, as nearly equal in number as practicable; and the places of the senators of the first class shall become vacant at the expiration of three years, and the places of those of the second class at the expiration of six years, from the beginning of their term of service; and afterwards the places of senators shall become vacant at the expiration of six years from the beginning of their term of service.~~
~~The election to fill vacant places shall be made within one year before the places are to become vacant.~~
~~For the purposes of this section the term of service of a senator shall be taken to begin on the first day of July following the day of his election, except in the cases of the first election and of the election next after any dissolution of the Senate, when it shall be taken to begin on the first day of July preceding the day of his election.~~

~~14. Further provision for rotation~~

~~Whenever the number of senators for a State is increased or diminished, the Parliament of the Commonwealth may make such provision for the vacating of the places of senators for the State as it deems necessary to maintain regularity in the rotation.~~

13. Terms of service of senators.

(1) The terms of service of senators expire upon the expiry or dissolution of the House of Representatives.
(2) Subsection (1) applies in relation to the term of service of any senator, including:

(a) a senator holding office at the commencement of this section; and
(b) a senator chosen or appointed after that commencement in consequence of a vacancy existing at that commencement;

but, in the case of a senator appointed by the Governor of a State, this section does not extend the term of the appointment after the expiration of 20 fourteen days from the beginning of the next session of the Parliament of the State following the making of the appointment.

28. Duration of House of Representatives

Every House of Representatives shall continue for ~~three years~~ four years from the first meeting of the House, and no longer, but may be sooner dissolved by the Governor-General.
In relation to a House of Representatives whose first meeting occurred before the commencement of the Constitution Alteration (Parliamentary Terms) 1988, the last preceding paragraph has effect as if the reference to four years were a reference to three years.

== Result ==
The referendum was not approved by a majority of voters, and a majority of the voters was not achieved in any state. (Note: Handbook of the 44th Parliament (2014) "Part 5 - Referendums and Plebiscites - Referendum results". Parliamentary Library of Australia.)

Result
State	Electoral roll	Ballots issued	For		Against		Informal
State	Electoral roll	Ballots issued	Vote	%	Vote	%	Informal
New South Wales	3,564,856	3,297,246	1,032,621	31.66	2,228,503	68.34	36,122
Victoria	2,697,096	2,491,183	886,128	36.20	1,561,759	63.80	43,296
Queensland	1,693,247	1,552,293	542,414	35.15	1,000,124	64.84	9,755
South Australia	937,974	873,511	229,938	26.76	629,454	73.24	14,119
Western Australia	926,636	845,209	255,556	30.67	577,555	69.33	12,098
Tasmania	302,324	282,785	70,698	25.34	208,297	74.66	3,790
Australian Capital Territory (Note: Following the 1977 referendum, votes cast in the territories count towards the national total, but are not counted toward any state total.)	166,131	149,128	64,458	43.62	83,328	56.38	1,342
Northern Territory	74,695	56,370	21,092	38.13	34,222	61.87	1,056
Total for Commonwealth	10,362,959	9,537,725	3,099,270	32.91	6,316,940	67.09	121,515
Results	Obtained a majority in no state and an overall minority of 3,217,670 votes. Not carried						

== Discussion ==
This was the fourth unsuccessful referendum that sought to require simultaneous elections of the House of Representatives and the Senate.

Simultaneous election results
Question	NSW	Vic	Qld	SA	WA	Tas	ACT	NT	States in favour	Voters in favour	Result
(29) 1974 Simultaneous Elections	51.1%	49.2%	44.3%	47.1%	44.1%	41.4%	—N/a	—N/a	1:5	48.3%	Not carried
(33) 1977 Simultaneous Elections	70.7%	65.0%	47.5%	66.0%	48.5%	34.3%	—N/a	—N/a	3:3	62.2%	Not carried
(37) 1984 Terms of Senators	52.9%	53.2%	45.7%	50.0%	46.5%	39.3%	56.7%	51.9%	2:4	50.6%	Not carried
(39) 1988 Parliamentary Terms	31.7%	36.2%	35.2%	26.8%	30.7%	25.3%	43.6%	38.1%	0:6	32.9%	Not carried

== See also ==
- 1988 Australian referendum
- Referendums in Australia
- Politics of Australia
- History of Australia
