= 1984 Australian referendum (Terms of Senators) =

Unsuccessful referendum

Australian Senator Terms referendum, 1984
- 1 December 1984
- An Act to change the terms of senators so that they are no longer of fixed duration and to provide that Senate elections and House of Representatives elections are always held on the same day. Do you approve of this proposed alteration?
- Outcome: Amendment Failed

Results
Choice	Votes	%
Yes	4,473,715	50.64%
No	4,361,504	49.36%
Valid votes	8,835,219	95.22%
Invalid or blank votes	443,825	4.78%
Total votes	9,279,044	100.00%
Registered voters/turnout	9,866,266	94.05%
- Results by state, and division
- Note: Saturation of colour denotes strength of vote.

The Constitution Alteration (Terms of Senators) Bill 1984, was the third unsuccessful proposal to alter the Australian Constitution to require that Senate of Australia and House of Representatives elections be constitutionally enforced to occur on the same day. It was put to voters for approval in a referendum held on 1 December 1984.

This was the first referendum in which the electors in the territories were counted towards the national total (but not counted toward any state total) following the 1977 Australian referendum (Referendums) which enabled this.

== Background ==
A proposal for simultaneous elections had been unsuccessful at the referendum in 1974 and substantially the same proposal was again unsuccessful at the referendum in 1977. One of the criticisms of these proposals was that despite the title, the proposal did not require simultaneous elections and the real change which was so that the terms of Senators would be two terms of the House of Representatives. This proposal was similar, however, it was expressly named in relation to the terms of senators.

=== Yes case ===
The yes case was that there were too many elections and the proposal would decrease the number of elections.

=== No case ===
The no case was that the proposal was unnecessary. If the government wanted fewer elections, the House of Representatives could run its full term and the elections would be held at the same time. The proposal was an attempt to undermine the independence of the senate.

== Results ==
An Act to change the terms of senators so that they are no longer of fixed duration and to provide that Senate elections and House of Representatives elections are always held on the same day.

Do you approve this proposed alteration?

Result (Note: Handbook of the 44th Parliament (2014) "Part 5 - Referendums and Plebiscites - Referendum results". Parliamentary Library of Australia.)
State	Electoral roll	Ballots issued	For		Against		Informal
State	Electoral roll	Ballots issued	Vote	%	Vote	%	Informal
New South Wales	3,423,624	3,216,256	1,621,894	52.86	1,446,150	47.14	148,212
Victoria	2,617,291	2,475,891	1,244,451	53.20	1,094,760	46.80	136,680
Queensland	1,549,749	1,447,284	642,768	45.65	765,329	54.35	39,187
South Australia	908,424	856,226	398,127	49.98	398,463	50.02	59,636
Western Australia	858,763	806,637	358,502	46.47	412,996	53.53	35,139
Tasmania	289,142	277,100	102,762	39.29	158,777	60.71	15,561
Australian Capital Territory	150,416	140,982	76,901	56.68	58,764	43.32	5,317
Northern Territory	68,857	58,668	28,310	51.87	26,265	48.13	4,093
Total for Commonwealth	9,866,266	9,279,044	4,473,715	50.64	4,361,504	49.36	443,825
Results	Obtained a majority in two states and an overall majority of 112,211 votes. Not carried						

== Discussion ==
This was the third unsuccessful referendum that sought to require simultaneous elections of the House of Representatives and the Senate.

Simultaneous election results
Question	NSW	Vic	Qld	SA	WA	Tas	ACT (Note: Following the 1977 referendum, votes cast in the territories count towards the national total, but are not counted toward any state total.)	NT	States in favour	Voters in favour	Result
(29) 1974 Simultaneous Elections	51.1%	49.2%	44.3%	47.1%	44.1%	41.4%	—N/a	—N/a	1:5	48.3%	Not carried
(33) 1977 Simultaneous Elections	70.7%	65.0%	47.5%	66.0%	48.5%	34.3%	—N/a	—N/a	3:3	62.2%	Not carried
(37) 1984 Terms of Senators	52.9%	53.2%	45.7%	50.0%	46.5%	39.3%	56.7%	51.9%	2:4	50.6%	Not carried
(39) 1988 Parliamentary Terms	31.7%	36.2%	35.2%	26.8%	30.7%	25.3%	43.6%	38.1%	0:6	32.9%	Not carried

== See also ==
- 1984 Australian referendum
- Referendums in Australia
- Politics of Australia
- History of Australia
