= 1988 Australian referendum (Fair Elections) =

Referendum on proportional representation

1988 Australian Fair Elections referendum
3 September 1988
- A Proposed Law: To alter the Constitution to provide for fair and democratic parliamentary elections throughout Australia. Do you approve of this proposed alteration?
- Outcome: Not carried, A majority "no" vote nationally and in all six states.

Results
Choice	Votes	%
Yes	3,538,817	37.59%
No	5,874,558	62.41%
Valid votes	9,413,375	98.70%
Invalid or blank votes	124,350	1.30%
Total votes	9,537,725	100.00%
Registered voters/turnout	10,362,959	92.04%
- Results by federal electoral division
- Note: Saturation of colour denotes strength of vote

The Constitution Alteration (Fair Elections) Bill 1988, was an unsuccessful proposal to amend the Australian Constitution to enshrine the principle that each elector's vote should have equal value in Australia, also referred to as one vote, one value, including in both states and territories. It was put to voters for approval in a referendum held on 3 September 1988.

== Question ==
A Proposed Law: To alter the Constitution to provide for fair and democratic parliamentary elections throughout Australia.

Do you approve this proposed alteration?

== Proposed Changes to the Constitution ==
The proposal was to vary existing provisions of the Constitution as follows (removed text stricken through; substituted text in bold):

Section 8 Qualification of electors
Subject to this Constitution, the qualification of electors of senators shall be in each State or Territory that which is prescribed ~~by this Constitution, or~~ by the Parliament as the qualification for electors of members of the House of Representatives~~; but in the choosing of senators each elector shall vote only once~~.

Section 25 Provision as to races disqualified from voting
~~For the purposes of the last section, if by the law of any State all persons of any race are disqualified from voting at elections for the more numerous House of the Parliament of the State, then, in reckoning the number of the people of the State or of the Commonwealth, persons of that race resident in that State shall not be counted.~~

Section 29 Electoral divisions
~~Until the Parliament of the Commonwealth otherwise provides, the Parliament of any State may make laws for determining the divisions in each State for which members of the House of Representatives may be chosen, and the number of members to be chosen for each division. A division shall not be formed out of parts of different States.~~
~~In the absence of other provision, each State shall be one electorate.~~
(1) Subject to this Constitution, the Parliament may make laws providing for electoral divisions for which members of the House of Representatives may be chosen and fixing the number of members to be chosen for each division
(2) A division shall not be formed out of parts of different States
(3) A division may be formed out of an area comprising two or more areas each of which is a Territory or part of a Territory

Section 30 Qualification of electors
~~Until the Parliament otherwise provides, the qualification of electors of members of the House of Representatives shall be in each State that which is prescribed by the law of the State as the qualification of electors of the more numerous House of Parliament of the State; but in the choosing of members each elector shall vote only once.~~
Subject to this Constitution, the qualification of electors of members of the House of Representatives shall be, in each State or Territory, that which is prescribed by the Parliament.

Section 41 Right of electors of States
~~No adult person who has or acquires a right to vote at elections for the more numerous House of the Parliament of a State shall, while the right continues, be prevented by any law of the Commonwealth from voting at elections for either House of the Parliament of the Commonwealth.~~

The proposal was to add the following new provisions to the Constitution:

Section 107A Election of State Parliaments
(1) A House of the Parliament of a State shall be composed of members directly chosen by the people of the State
(2) Subject to this Constitution, the qualification of electors of members of a House of the Parliament of the State shall be that which is prescribed by the laws of the State

Section 122A Election of certain Territory legislatures
(1) The legislature of a Territory forming part of Australia or a combination of such Territories shall be composed of members directly chosen by the people of the Territory or Territories
(2) Subject to this Constitution and to any law made by the Parliament of the Commonwealth, the qualification of electors of members of the legislature shall be that which is prescribed by the laws of the Territory or Territories

CHAPTER VIA FAIR ELECTIONS
Interpretation.
124A In this Chapter

'election', means an election for choosing

(a) members of the House of Representatives for an electoral region,
(b) members of a House of the Parliament of a State, or
(c) members of the legislature of a Territory forming part of Australia or a combination of such Territories, otherwise than for the purpose of filling casual vacancies,

'electoral region' means

(a) a State or Territory, or
(b) an area comprising two or more areas each of which is a Territory or part of a Territory,

'fair distribution' means a determination of electoral divisions in accordance with section one hundred and twenty-four C

Votes to have equal value.
124B (1) In

(a) an election held in an electoral division, or
(b) an election held in an electoral region that is one electorate;
the method of voting shall be such that, with respect to the votes of all electors in the division, or in the electorate, as the case may be, votes shall not be weighted according to different classes of electors

(2) In this section, 'election' includes an election to choose senators

Fair distributions of electoral divisions.
124C (1) Where a law provides for electoral divisions in an electoral region, the divisions shall be determined so that the number of electors in each division does not depart to a greater extent than one-tenth more or one-tenth less from the number calculated under subsection (2)
(2) For the purposes of subsection (I), a number, in relation to a particular electoral division, shall be calculated by

(a) dividing the total number of electors in all the electoral divisions in the electoral region by the total number of members to be chosen in all those divisions, and
(b) multiplying the result by the number of members to be chosen for that electoral division

(3) If, in relation to a determination of electoral divisions

(a) no proceedings challenging the determination have been instituted as provided by this Chapter, or
(b) any proceedings so instituted have been withdrawn or dismissed, the determination shall be taken to have been made in accordance with this section

Elections in divisions.
124D (1) An election in an electoral region may be held in electoral divisions only if

(a) the divisions have been determined by a fair distribution made after the commencement of this Chapter and not more than seven years before the election, and
(b) subsection (2) does not apply in relation to the electoral divisions

(2) Subject to subsection (3), this subsection applies to electoral divisions for an election if, on the last day of each of any two or more successive months since the last fair distribution before that election, the numbers of the electors in more than one-third of the divisions were such that, if the divisions had been determined with those numbers of electors, the determination would not have been a fair distribution
(3) In ascertaining whether subsection (2) applies in relation to electoral divisions for an election, a particular month shall be disregarded if the last day of the month occurs within twenty-six weeks before the date of expiry, by effluxion of time, of the terms of service of all or any of the members of the House concerned
(4) This section does not apply to an election held before the end of one year after the commencement of this Chapter
(5) In this section

'House' means

(a) the House of Representatives,
(b) a House of the Parliament of a State, or
(c) a chamber (by whatever name called) of the legislature of a Territory or combination of Territories,

'month' means one of the twelve months of the year;

Elections where electoral region to be one electorate.
124E (1) Where an election in an electoral region is not to be held in electoral divisions or, if so held, is or would be contrary to section one hundred and twenty-four D, the region shall be one electorate
(2) Where a region is to be one electorate, an election in the electorate shall be held

(a) if the election is for the purpose of choosing members of the House of Representatives—as the Parliament provides, or
(b) if the election is for the purpose of choosing members of a House of the Parliament of a State of the legislature of a Territory or a combination of Territories—in accordance with the law of the State, Territory or Territories, as the case requires, or, if there is no such law, as the Parliament provides;
but so that the method of choosing those members shall be a system of proportional representation

Casual vacancies.
124F Nothing in this Constitution prevents the filling of a casual vacancy in the membership of

(a) a House of the Parliament of a State, or
(b) the legislature of a Territory forming part of Australia or a combination of such Territories, in the manner provided by the Parliament of that State or, subject to any law made by the Parliament of the Commonwealth, by that legislature, as the case requires

Right to challenge determinations of electoral divisions.
124G (1) Subject to subsection (2), a determination of electoral divisions may be challenged by an elector in a court of competent jurisdiction on the ground that the determination was not a fair distribution
(2) An elector shall not institute proceedings under subsection (1) after the end of forty days after both of the following have been notified to the public, namely

(a) the results of the determination, and
(b) all statistics necessary to ascertain whether or not the determination was a fair distribution

(3) In this section, 'elector', in relation to a determination of electoral divisions, means a person whose name is on a roll of electors qualified to vote at an election in those divisions

Right to vote.
124H (1) Laws prescribing the qualifications of electors for elections shall be such that each Australian citizen who

(a) complies with reasonable conditions prescribed by those laws as to residence and enrolment, and
(b) has reached the age of eighteen years, is entitled to vote, subject to any disqualification prescribed by those laws as to persons who
(c) because of unsoundness of mind, are incapable of understanding the nature and significance of enrolment and voting, or
(d) are undergoing imprisonment for an offence

(2) If

(a) a person applies to a court of competent jurisdiction for an order under this subsection, and
(b) the person would be qualified as an elector as provided by this section but for the fact that the relevant law is inconsistent with this section, the court may order that the person shall be enrolled, and is entitled to vote, as if the person were so qualified

(3) This section does not apply in relation to an election held before the end of one year after the commencement of this Chapter

Electors to have only one vote.

124J In the choosing of

(a) senators,
(b) members of the House of Representatives,
(c) members of a House of Parliament of a State, or
(d) members of the legislature of a Territory forming part of Australia or a combination of such Territories,
each elector shall vote only once.

== Results ==
Result (Note: Handbook of the 44th Parliament (2014) "Part 5 - Referendums and Plebiscites - Referendum results". Parliamentary Library of Australia.)
State	Electoral roll	Ballots issued	For		Against		Informal
State	Electoral roll	Ballots issued	Vote	%	Vote	%	Informal
New South Wales	3,564,856	3,297,246	1,159,713	35.57	2,100,604	64.43	36,929
Victoria	2,697,096	2,491,183	981,508	40.12	1,465,119	59.88	44,556
Queensland	1,693,247	1,552,293	691,492	44.83	850,979	55.17	9,822
South Australia	937,974	873,511	263,006	30.61	596,102	69.39	14,403
Western Australia	926,636	845,209	266,639	32.02	566,145	67.98	12,425
Tasmania	302,324	282,785	80,608	28.89	198,372	71.11	3,805
Australian Capital Territory (Note: Following the 1977 referendum, votes cast in the territories count towards the national total, but are not counted toward any state total.)	166,131	149,128	76,815	51.99	70,937	48.01	1,376
Northern Territory	74,695	56,370	23,763	42.99	31,512	57.01	1,095
Total for Commonwealth	10,362,959	9,537,725	3,538,817	37.59	5,874,558	62.41	124,350
Results	Obtained a majority in no state and an overall minority of 2,335,741 votes. Not carried						

== Discussion ==
This was the second unsuccessful referendum that sought to enshrine proportional representation in Australia, also referred to as one vote, one value and prevent gerrymandering by the use of electoral malapportionment.

Proportional representation results
Question	NSW	Vic	Qld	SA	WA	Tas	ACT	NT	States in favour	Voters in favour	Result
(31) Democratic Elections	50.5%	47.7%	43.7%	44.1%	42.9%	40.8%	—	—	1:5	47.2%	Not carried
(40) 1988 Fair elections	35.6%	40.1%	44.8%	30.6%	32.0%	28.9%	52.0%	43.0%	0:6	37.6%	Not carried

== See also ==
- 1988 Australian referendum
- Referendums in Australia
- Politics of Australia
- History of Australia
