= 1988 Australian referendum =

Referendum on proposed amendments to the Constitution of Australia

The 1988 Australian referendum was held on 3 September 1988. It contained four referendum questions, none of which passed.

Results (Note: Handbook of the 44th Parliament (2014) "Part 5 - Referendums and Plebiscites - Referendum results". Parliamentary Library of Australia.)
Question	NSW	Vic	Qld	SA	WA	Tas	ACT	NT	States in favour	Voters in favour	Result
(39) Parliamentary Terms	32%	36%	35%	27%	31%	25%	44%	38%	0:6	33%	Not carried
(40) Fair Elections	36%	40%	45%	31%	32%	29%	52%	43%	0:6	38%	Not carried
(41) Local Government	32%	36%	38%	30%	30%	28%	40%	39%	0:6	34%	Not carried
(42) Rights and Freedoms	30%	33%	33%	26%	28%	25%	41%	37%	0:6	31%	Not carried

== Results in detail ==
=== Parliamentary Terms ===
This section is an excerpt from 1988 Australian referendum (Parliamentary Terms) § Result

Result
State	Electoral roll	Ballots issued	For		Against		Informal
State	Electoral roll	Ballots issued	Vote	%	Vote	%	Informal
New South Wales	3,564,856	3,297,246	1,032,621	31.66	2,228,503	68.34	36,122
Victoria	2,697,096	2,491,183	886,128	36.20	1,561,759	63.80	43,296
Queensland	1,693,247	1,552,293	542,414	35.15	1,000,124	64.84	9,755
South Australia	937,974	873,511	229,938	26.76	629,454	73.24	14,119
Western Australia	926,636	845,209	255,556	30.67	577,555	69.33	12,098
Tasmania	302,324	282,785	70,698	25.34	208,297	74.66	3,790
Australian Capital Territory (Note: Following the 1977 referendum, votes cast in the territories count towards the national total, but are not counted toward any state total.)	166,131	149,128	64,458	43.62	83,328	56.38	1,342
Northern Territory	74,695	56,370	21,092	38.13	34,222	61.87	1,056
Total for Commonwealth	10,362,959	9,537,725	3,099,270	32.91	6,316,940	67.09	121,515
Results	Obtained a majority in no state and an overall minority of 3,217,670 votes. Not carried						

=== Fair Elections ===
This section is an excerpt from 1988 Australian referendum (Fair Elections) § Results

Result
State	Electoral roll	Ballots issued	For		Against		Informal
State	Electoral roll	Ballots issued	Vote	%	Vote	%	Informal
New South Wales	3,564,856	3,297,246	1,159,713	35.57	2,100,604	64.43	36,929
Victoria	2,697,096	2,491,183	981,508	40.12	1,465,119	59.88	44,556
Queensland	1,693,247	1,552,293	691,492	44.83	850,979	55.17	9,822
South Australia	937,974	873,511	263,006	30.61	596,102	69.39	14,403
Western Australia	926,636	845,209	266,639	32.02	566,145	67.98	12,425
Tasmania	302,324	282,785	80,608	28.89	198,372	71.11	3,805
Australian Capital Territory	166,131	149,128	76,815	51.99	70,937	48.01	1,376
Northern Territory	74,695	56,370	23,763	42.99	31,512	57.01	1,095
Total for Commonwealth	10,362,959	9,537,725	3,538,817	37.59	5,874,558	62.41	124,350
Results	Obtained a majority in no state and an overall minority of 2,335,741 votes. Not carried						

=== Local Government ===
This section is an excerpt from 1988 Australian referendum (Local Government) § Results

Result
State	Electoral roll	Ballots issued	For		Against		Informal
State	Electoral roll	Ballots issued	Vote	%	Vote	%	Informal
New South Wales	3,564,856	3,297,246	1,033,364	31.70	2,226,529	68.30	37,353
Victoria	2,697,096	2,491,183	882,020	36.06	1,563,957	63.94	45,206
Queensland	1,693,247	1,552,293	590,868	38.31	951,332	61.69	10,093
South Australia	937,974	873,511	256,421	29.85	602,499	70.15	14,591
Western Australia	926,636	845,209	247,830	29.76	584,863	70.24	12,516
Tasmania	302,324	282,785	76,707	27.50	202,214	72.50	3,864
Australian Capital Territory	166,131	149,128	58,755	39.78	88,945	60.22	1,428
Northern Territory	74,695	56,370	21,449	38.80	33,826	61.20	1,095
Total for Commonwealth	10,362,959	9,537,725	3,163,488	33.61	6,248,166	66.39	126,071
Results	Obtained a majority in no state and an overall minority of 2,335,741 votes. Not carried						

=== Rights and Freedoms ===
This section is an excerpt from 1988 Australian referendum (Rights and Freedoms) § Results

Result
State	Electoral roll	Ballots issued	For		Against		Informal
State	Electoral roll	Ballots issued	Vote	%	Vote	%	Informal
New South Wales	3,564,856	3,297,246	965,045	29.65	2,289,645	70.35	42,556
Victoria	2,697,096	2,491,183	816,057	33.42	1,625,484	66.58	49,642
Queensland	1,693,247	1,552,293	506,710	32.90	1,033,645	67.10	11,938
South Australia	937,974	873,511	223,038	26.01	634,438	73.99	16,035
Western Australia	926,636	845,209	233,917	28.14	597,322	71.86	13,970
Tasmania	302,324	282,785	70,987	25.49	207,486	74.51	4,312
Australian Capital Territory	166,131	149,128	60,064	40.71	87,460	59.29	1,604
Northern Territory	74,695	56,370	20,503	37.14	34,699	62.86	1,168
Total for Commonwealth	10,362,959	9,537,725	2,892,828	30.79	6,503,752	69.21	141,145
Results	Obtained a majority in no state and an overall minority of 3,610,924 votes. Not carried						

== See also ==
- Referendums in Australia
- Politics of Australia
- History of Australia
