= List of elections in 1910 =

The following elections occurred in the year 1910.

== Africa ==
- South African general election

== Europe ==
- 1910 Belgian general election
- 1910 Bosnian parliamentary election
- 1910 Croatian parliamentary election
- Danish Folketing election
- Danish Landsting election
- Faroese general election
- Finnish parliamentary election
- French legislative election
- August 1910 Greek legislative election
- November 1910 Greek legislative election
- 1910 Hungarian parliamentary election
- Liechtestein general election
- Portuguese legislative election
- Spanish general election

=== United Kingdom ===
- January 1910 United Kingdom general election
- January 1910 United Kingdom general election in Ireland
- January 1910 United Kingdom general election in Scotland
- List of MPs elected in the January 1910 United Kingdom general election
- 1910 Barnstaple by-election
- December 1910 United Kingdom general election
- December 1910 United Kingdom general election in Ireland
- December 1910 United Kingdom general election in Scotland
- List of MPs elected in the December 1910 United Kingdom general election
- List of United Kingdom MPs who only sat in the February–November 1910 Parliament
- 1910 Barnstaple by-election
- 1910 Crewe by-election
- 1910 Dublin Harbour by-election
- 1910 East Dorset by-election
- 1910 Edinburgh South by-election
- 1910 Govan by-election
- 1910 Ilkeston by-election
- 1910 Lewes by-election
- 1910 Liverpool Kirkdale by-election
- 1910 North Down by-election
- 1910 North East Cork by-election
- 1910 Reading by-election
- 1910 Rotherham by-election
- 1910 Shipley by-election
- 1910 South Shields by-election
- 1910 Swansea District by-election
- 1910 The Hartlepools by-election
- 1910 Walthamstow by-election
- 1910 West Wicklow by-election

== America ==
- Argentine general election
- Brazilian presidential election
- Chilean presidential election
- Colombian presidential election
- Costa Rican general election
- Guatemalan presidential election
- Mexican general election
- Uruguayan parliamentary election

=== Canada ===
- 1910 Edmonton municipal election
- 1910 Manitoba general election
- 1910 Toronto municipal election

=== United States ===
- 1910 New York state election
- 1910 United States elections

==== United States lieutenant gubernatorial ====
- 1910 California lieutenant gubernatorial election
- 1910 Connecticut lieutenant gubernatorial election
- 1910 Minnesota lieutenant gubernatorial election
- 1910 Nebraska lieutenant gubernatorial election
- 1910 Texas lieutenant gubernatorial election
- 1910 Wisconsin lieutenant gubernatorial election

==== United States gubernatorial ====
- 1910 Alabama gubernatorial election
- 1910 Arkansas gubernatorial election
- 1910 California gubernatorial election
- 1910 Colorado gubernatorial election
- 1910 Connecticut gubernatorial election
- 1910 Georgia gubernatorial election
- 1910 Idaho gubernatorial election
- 1910 Iowa gubernatorial election
- 1910 Kansas gubernatorial election
- 1910 Maine gubernatorial election
- 1910 Massachusetts gubernatorial election
- 1910 Michigan gubernatorial election
- 1910 Minnesota gubernatorial election
- 1910 Nebraska gubernatorial election
- 1910 Nevada gubernatorial election
- 1910 New Hampshire gubernatorial election
- 1910 New Jersey gubernatorial election
- 1910 New York gubernatorial election
- 1910 North Dakota gubernatorial election
- 1910 Ohio gubernatorial election
- 1910 Oklahoma gubernatorial election
- 1910 Oregon gubernatorial election
- 1910 Pennsylvania gubernatorial election
- 1910 Rhode Island gubernatorial election
- 1910 South Carolina gubernatorial election
- 1910 South Dakota gubernatorial election
- 1910 Tennessee gubernatorial election
- 1910 Texas gubernatorial election
- 1910 United States gubernatorial elections
- 1910 Vermont gubernatorial election
- 1910 Wisconsin gubernatorial election
- 1910 Wyoming gubernatorial election

==== United States House of Representatives ====
- 1910 United States House of Representatives elections
- 1910 United States House of Representatives elections in California
- 1910 United States House of Representatives elections in Oklahoma
- 1910 United States House of Representatives elections in South Carolina
- 1910 United States House of Representatives elections in Wisconsin

==== United States Senate ====
- 1910–11 United States Senate elections

==== United States mayoral elections ====
- 1910 Boston mayoral election
- 1910 Manchester, New Hampshire mayoral election
- 1910 Milwaukee mayoral election

== Oceania ==
=== Australia ===
- 1910 Australian Senate election
- 1910 Australian federal election
- 1910 Australian referendum
- 1910 Belmore state by-election
- 1910 Darling Harbour state by-election
- 1910 Kooyong by-election
- 1910 Australian referendum
- 1910 Northumberland state by-election
- 1910 Queanbeyan state by-election
- 1910 New South Wales state election
- 1910 South Australian state election
- 1910 Upper Hunter state by-election

=== New Zealand ===
- 1910 Auckland East by-election

== See also ==
- Category:1910 elections
