= Elsie Bowerman =

British lawyer and suffragette (1889–1973)

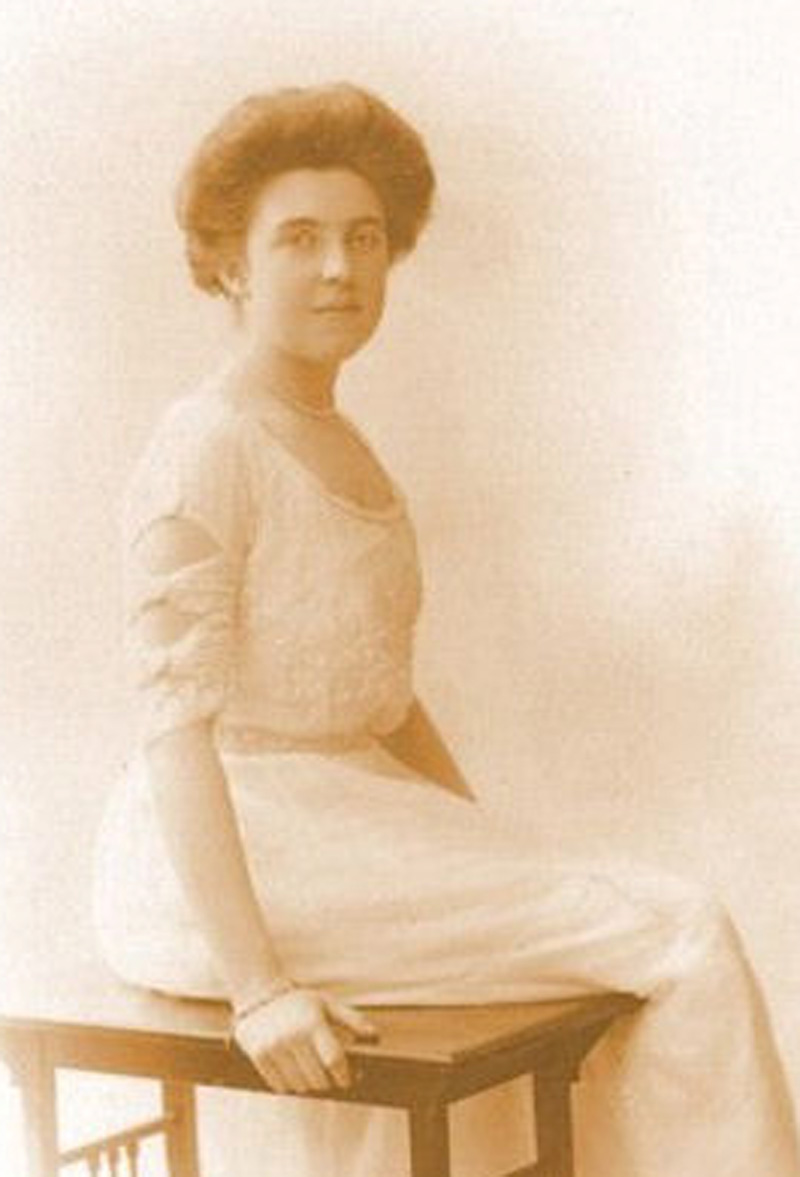
- Elsie Bowerman (c. 1910)

Personal details
- Born: 18 December 1889 Tunbridge Wells, Kent, England, United Kingdom of Great Britain and Ireland
- Died: 18 October 1973 (aged 83) Hailsham, East Sussex, England, United Kingdom
- Party: Women's Social and Political Union

Elsie Edith Bowerman (18 December 1889 – 18 October 1973) was a British lawyer, suffragette, political activist, and RMS Titanic survivor.

== Early life ==
Elsie Edith Bowerman was born in Tunbridge Wells, Kent, the only daughter of William Bowerman and his wife Edith Martha Barber. Her father, William, was a prosperous businessman and died when Elsie was five years old. She attended Wycombe Abbey as a boarder from the age of 11 in 1901, becoming the youngest student there. She later wrote the biography of Frances Dove, her headmistress during her time at Wycombe. After spending some time in Paris, Elsie continued her education at Girton College, Cambridge, where she studied for the Medieval and Modern Languages Tripos and received a class II in her final examinations in 1911.

== Suffragette activism ==
Whilst at Girton she became a committed suffragette, taking part in informal activism such as giving out Votes for Women to others and organising suffrage events for her peers. She once had Emmeline Pankhurst stay for a night when she gave a talk in nearby Cambridge. Despite being an active member of the WSPU, there is no record of Elsie taking part in militancy at this time.

Elsie campaigned on behalf of the WSPU at the general election in 1910. She addressed an open-air meeting to an audience of 1000 in Hastings, alongside Evelyn Wharry and Victor Duval.

Shortly after the 1910 general election, the suffragettes agreed to a truce from militancy to give The Conciliation Bill, a cross-party initiative to grant a limited form of women suffrage, the best chance of succeeding. This truce lasted till November 1910, when the Government announced it would allocate no more time to the Bill. In response, suffragettes marched on Parliamentary Square and clashed with police in an event known as Black Friday. Elsie's mother, Edith, who was also a member of the WSPU, took part in this event. She later told author Antonia Raeburn that 'a nearby policeman [gave] her a blow on the head. He caught me by the hair and flinging me aside said: 'Die then!' I found afterwards that so much force had been used that my hairpins were bent double in my hair and my sealskin coat was torn to ribbons.'

In 1914, Elsie was appointed the Eastbourne district organiser for the WSPU.

== Aboard the Titanic ==
On 10 April 1912 Elsie Bowerman and her mother Edith boarded RMS Titanic at Southampton as first class passengers in cabin 33 on deck E, for a trip to America and Canada to see her father's relations in North America. Both women had been active in suffrage activism right up until their departure; the Saturday before sailing Elsie attended an open-air meeting in Hastings in support of the cause. Although initially reported as missing, both women were rescued in lifeboat 6, alongside Molly Brown and Frederick Fleet, the ship lookout who had originally spotted the iceberg. The suffragette periodical, Votes for Women, celebrated their survival, stating that they were 'very enthusiastic workers in the cause.' After the Titanic disaster, they reached America and carried on with their plans to visit British Columbia, Klondyke and Alaska.

== World War One ==
During World War I Bowerman was still closely associated with the Pankhursts, helping to organise the Women's War Procession in July 1916. She was then asked by Evelina Haverfield to join the Scottish Women's Hospitals for Foreign Service. Elsie worked as an orderly in Serbia during 1916 and 1917, and on her way back to England witnessed the beginnings of the Russian Revolution in Petrograd in March 1917.

== The Women's Party ==
After the partial enfranchisement of women in the Representation of the People Act 1918 and the Parliament (Qualification of Women Act) 1918, Christabel Pankhurst decided to stand as a parliamentary candidate in the 1918 general election. Pankhurst stood as a candidate of the Women's Party, a short-lived successor to the WSPU, in Smethwick. The Women's Party was formed by Christabel and Emmeline Pankhurst and its policies contained a mix of feminism and nationalistic propaganda. Elsie, who would have turned 30 four days after the general election and was therefore, under the age requirements of the Representation of the People Act 1918, ineligible to vote, acted as Christabel's election agent.

== The Women's Guild of Empire ==
Alongside fellow former suffragette Flora Drummond, Elsie co-founded The Women's Guild of Empire in later 1919 or early 1920. By 1925, the group claimed 20,000 members. This organisation was anti-fascist, anti-communist and pro-Conservative. The Guild opposed trade unions, arguing that strikes and lock-outs contributed to post-war unemployment. The Scotsman called the Guild 'one of the most active organisations for countering Communist or Bolshevist propaganda in Scotland today.'

In April 1926, the Guild organised a large procession to protest the industrial unrest that was shortly to lead to the General Strike in London under the slogan 'Women Unite to Save the Nation.' Elsie wrote to the editor of The Spectator publicising the event; stating that ‘20,000 women’ were expected to attend, and emphasising that those attending 'are the wives of working men who have had personal experience of strikes, and know what hardships they mean.'

== Barrister ==
The Sex Disqualification (Removal) Act 1919 allowed women to become barristers and solicitors for the first time. Elsie was amongst the early cohorts of women barristers. She joined Middle Temple and was called to the bar in 1924, practising till 1938. She was the first woman barrister to appear at the Old Bailey, in a case in which she was part of a prosecuting team against Harry Pollitt, a prominent communist, for libel. She also practised on the South Eastern Circuit, one of the regional routes that barristers travelled on in England and Wales. Elsie wrote a legal book titled The Law of Child Protection.

== Later life ==
In 1947 she went to the United States to help set up the United Nations Commission on the Status of Women. On her return she lived near her mother at St Leonards-on-Sea, and then moved to a country house near Hailsham where she died after a stroke.

== Publications ==
- Stands there a School – Memories of Dame Frances Dove, D.B.E., Founder of Wycombe Abbey School (1965)
- The Law of Child Protection

== See also ==
- List of suffragists and suffragettes

== Archives ==
The archives of Elsie Bowerman are held at The Women's Library at the Library of the London School of Economics, ref 7ELB
