= 1910 Australian referendum (Surplus Revenue) =

- 13 April 1910
- Do you approve of the proposed law for the alteration of the Constitution entitled — "Constitution Alteration (Finance) 1909" ?
- Outcome: Amendment Failed

Results
Choice	Votes	%
Yes	645,514	49.04%
No	670,838	50.96%
Valid votes	1,316,352	94.11%
Invalid or blank votes	82,437	5.89%
Total votes	1,398,789	100.00%
Registered voters/turnout	2,258,482	61.93%

The Constitution Alteration (Finance) Bill 1909, was an unsuccessful Australian referendum which sought to alter the Australian Constitution to amend section 87 (the 'Braddon Clause') which was due to lapse in 1910. It was to add to the Constitution a financial agreement reached between the States and the Commonwealth to replace the section.

The referendum was held in the 1910 Australian referendum in conjunction with the State Debts referendum, which received a Yes vote in 5 states and was carried. The referendums were held on the same day as the 1910 federal election, which Alfred Deakin's Commonwealth Liberal Party lost to Andrew Fisher's Labour Party, with Fisher being sworn in as Prime Minister on 29 April.

== Question ==
Do you approve of the proposed law for the alteration of the Constitution entitled 'Constitution Alteration (Finance) 1909'?

== Proposed Changes to the Constitution ==
The proposal was to alter the text of the Constitution to read as follows (removed text stricken through; substituted text in bold):

87. During a period of ten years after the establishment of the Commonwealth and thereafter

until the Parliament otherwise provides, of the net revenue of the Commonwealth from duties of customs and of excise not more than one - fourth shall be applied annually by the Commonwealth towards its expenditure.

The balance shall, in accordance with. this Constitution, be paid to the several States, or applied towards the payment of interest on debts of the several States taken over by the Commonwealth.

87a. (1.) Notwithstanding anything in section eighty seven of this Constitution, the Commonwealth may in the year beginning on the first day of July, One thousand nine hundred and nine, out of the net revenue of the Commonwealth from duties of customs and of excise, apply towards its expenditure for the service of that year any sum not exceeding Six hundred thousand pounds over and above one-fourth Of the said net revenue.

(2.) From and after the thirtieth day of June, One thousand nine hundred and ten, section eighty seven of this Constitution shall cease to have effect.

93. During the first five Years after the imposition of uniform duties of customs, and thereafter until the Parliament otherwise provides

(i.) The duties of customs chargeable on goods imported into a State and afterwards passing into another State for consumption, and the duties of excise paid on goods produced or manufactured in a State and afterwards passing into another State for consumption, shall be taken to have been collected not in the former but in the latter State :
(ii.) Subject to the last sub - section, the Commonwealth shall credit revenue, debit expenditure, and pay balances to the several States as prescribed for the period preceding the imposition of uniform duties of customs.

94. After five years from the imposition of uniform duties of customs, the Parliament may provide, on such basis as it deems fair, for the monthly payment to the several States of all surplus revenue of the Commonwealth.

94a. From and after the thirtieth day of June, One thousand nine hundred and ten, sections ninety three and ninety four of this Constitution shall cease to have effect.

94b. From and after the first day of July, One thousand nine hundred and ten, the Commonwealth shall pay to each State, by monthly instalments, or apply to the payment of interest on debts of the State taken over by the Commonwealth, an annual sum amounting to Twenty five shillings per head of the number of the people of the State as ascertained according to the laws of the Commonwealth.

94c. (1.) The Commonwealth shall, during the period of twenty five years beginning on the first day of July, One thousand nine hundred and ten, pay to the State of Western Australia, by monthly instalments, an annual sum which in the first year shall be two hundred and fifty thousand pounds, and in each subsequent year shall be progressively diminished by the sum of ten thousand. pounds.

(2.) One half of the amount of the payments so made shall be debited to all the States (including the State of Western Australia) in proportion to the number of their people as ascertained according to the laws of the Commonwealth, and any sum so debited to a State may be deducted by the Commonwealth from any amounts payable to the State under the last preceding section or this section.

105. The Parliament may take over from the States their public debts as existing at the establishment of the Commonwealth, or a proportion thereof according to the respective numbers of their people as shown by the latest statistics of the Commonwealth, and may convert, renew, or consolidate such debts, or any part thereof; and the States shall indemnify the Commonwealth in respect of the debts taken over, ~~and thereafter the interest payable in respect of the debts shall be deducted and retained from the portions of the surplus revenue of the Commonwealth payable to the several States, or if such surplus is insufficient, or if there is no surplus, then the deficiency or the whole amount shall be paid by the several. States;~~

The interest and charges 'payable by the Commonwealth, in respect of the debts of a State taken over, may be deducted and retained from any moneys payable to the State under this Constitution, and shall, to the extent to which they are not so deducted and retained,' be paid by the State to the Commonwealth.

== Referendum results ==
The referendum was not approved by a majority of voters, and a majority of the voters was achieved in only three states. (Note: Handbook of the 44th Parliament (2014) "Part 5 - Referendums and Plebiscites - Referendum results". Parliamentary Library of Australia.)

Result
State	Electoral roll	Ballots issued	For		Against		Informal
State	Electoral roll	Ballots issued	Vote	%	Vote	%	Informal
New South Wales	834,662	512,802	227,650	47.35	253,107	52.65	31,411
Victoria	703,699	468,535	200,165	45.26	242,119	54.74	24,299
Queensland	279,031	170,634	87,130	54.58	72,516	45.42	9,489
South Australia	207,655	110,503	49,352	49.06	51,250	50.94	9,679
Western Australia	134,979	83,893	49,050	61.74	30,392	38.26	3,890
Tasmania	98,456	57,609	32,167	59.99	21,454	40.01	3,669
Total for Commonwealth	2,258,482	1,403,976	645,514	49.04	670,838	50.96	82,437
Results	Obtained majority in three states and an overall minority of 25,324 votes. Not carried						

== See also ==
- Referendums in Australia
- Politics of Australia
- History of Australia
