= Annie Whitelaw =

Whitelaw, Annie Watt (1875–1966), headmistress and educationist

- Born: 17 August 1875; Edinburgh
- Died: 11 August 1966 (aged 90); Remuera
- Education: Auckland Girls Grammar and Girton College
- Occupations: headteacher and educationalist
- Employer: Wycombe Abbey

Annie Watt Whitelaw (17 August 1875 – 11 August 1966) was a British headmistress and educationist. She was a headteacher in New Zealand and the first NZ woman to attend Girton College and to lead a British school. She led religious orders and was the adviser on girls education in the British colonies.

== Early life and education ==
Whitelaw was born in 1875 in Edinburgh, one of twelve children of George Whitelaw and Grace née Hutton. Both her parents were from Perth in Australia, and her father was an accountant and treasurer for the United Presbyterian Church synod. In February 1879 she and her family left Scotland to join her father who was settling in New Zealand. She was educated at the High School and then at Auckland Grammar School. Whitelaw excelled in mathematics, and won a Junior University Scholarship in 1890. In 1893 she completed one year of medical training at Auckland University College.

Whitelaw left to study in Britain in 1883. She had considered being a pianist but she opted to be a mathematician after obtaining a place at Girton College in Cambridge. It is possible this change of plan came about through encouragement from William Steadman Aldis, professor of mathematics at Auckland University College, and his wife, Mary Aldis, who had lived in Cambridge and had connections with Emily Davies at Girton. Whitelaw passed the mathematical tripos examinations with a Class II in part I, in 1897.

== Teaching career ==
Whitelaw began her teaching career in 1898, at Wycombe Abbey girls school. She had attended Girton alongside the founder and head of the school, Frances Dove. Both of them were both awarded MA degrees by Trinity College, Dublin in recognition of their success at Cambridge. In 1906, the Auckland Grammar School was divided into two parts, and Whitelaw was invited back to New Zealand to head the girls' part, the Auckland Girls' Grammar School. When she arrived the school was not yet built, but she found the academic standards on a par with those in England.

In 1910, Frances Dove retired, and Whitelaw was invited to return to Wycombe Abbey as the school's second headmistress. The board that appointed her noted her capabilities and her experience abroad was considered beneficial. She stayed there until 1925 having built a chapel for the school's pupils. Whitelaw was deeply religious and her increasing emphasis on religion and community service as part of the school curriculum led to tensions with the school council, who felt academic standards were at risk. After her resignation as headmistress, Whitelaw took up the wider cause of women's welfare.

== Women's welfare ==
In 1925, Whitelaw was appointed to a Colonial Office committee on "native education", which led to six months spent assessing educational institutions in British colonies in Tanganyika Territory and Uganda. For four years she was director of women's education at the Selly Oak Missionary Colleges. After this she took up voluntary work as the warden at the Talbot Settlement, an Anglican women's mission in Camberwell.

== Death and legacy ==
In 1938, Whitelaw returned to New Zealand where she lived in Remuera with her sister Edith. She was active in the New Zealand Federation of University Women, and served on the board of the YWCA. Whitelaw died in Remuera in 1966.

Wycombe Abbey School has a Whitelaw Memorial Library.
