= All Saints Church, High Wycombe =

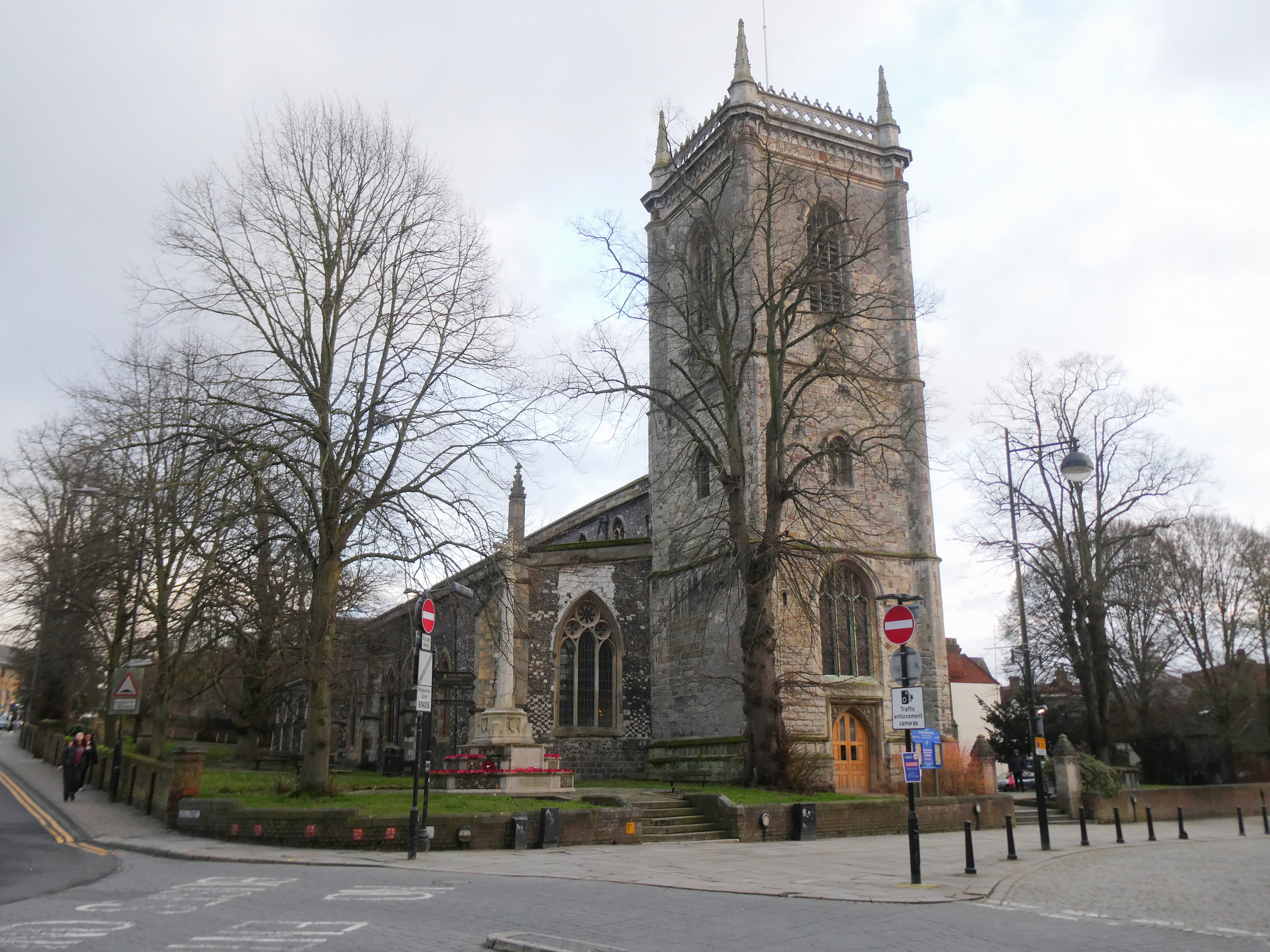
- All Saints Church, High Wycombe
- 51.630105°N 0.751139°W
- Location: High Wycombe, Buckinghamshire
- Country: England
- Denomination: Church of England
- Website: https://www.allsaintshighwycombe.org/

History
- Dedication: All Saints

Architecture
- Heritage designation: Grade I listed

Administration
- Diocese: Oxford
- Parish: High Wycombe

All Saints Church, High Wycombe is a Grade I listed Church of England parish church in High Wycombe, Buckinghamshire.

== History ==
The church was originally built in the Norman period, and is reported to have been consecrated by St Wulfstan, Bishop of Worcester, who was licensed to consecrate the church by the Bishop of Lincoln, within whose diocese Wycombe fell. In 1176, Henry II gave the church and its tithes to Godstow Abbey. The church was rebuilt in 1273, and was substantially remodelled and extended in the late fifteenth and early sixteenth century, with the west tower probably built between 1521 and 1535. The parapet and pinnacles were added to the tower in 1755 by Henry Keene.

The church was restored between 1874 and 1877 by George Edmund Street, who designed the pulpit and font. The exterior was restored in 1887–1889 by John Oldrid Scott, who subsequently restored the medieval south porch in 1893–1894.

== Interior ==
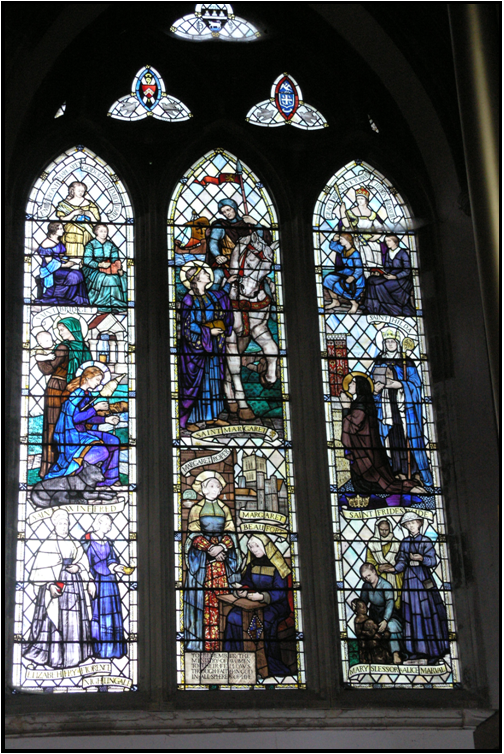
Window given by Frances Dove in 1932.

The east end of the church contains two large eighteenth-century monuments, including a 1754 memorial by Peter Scheemakers in memory of Henry Petty, 1st Earl of Shelburne and a 1772 monument by Agostino Carlini in memory of Sophia Carteret, the first wife of William Petty, 2nd Earl of Shelburne, who served as Prime Minister from 1782 to 1783. A nearby stained glass window, installed in 1990, commemorates the role of the Earl of Shelburne and Benjamin Franklin in arranging the Treaty of Paris in 1783, which ended the American Revolutionary War.

Another stained glass window on the north side of the church by the organ, made by Caroline Townshend and Joan Howson, was given to the church in 1932 by Frances Dove, the first headmistress of Wycombe Abbey. The window commemorates the ministry of women, depicting a number of prominent historical women including Elizabeth Fry and Florence Nightingale.

The organ was built by Samuel Green in the west gallery of the church in 1783, and was repaired and removed to the north wall in 1867 by Henry Jones. The organ was subsequently rebuilt in 1931 by Henry Willis & Sons.
