= Barnstaple by-election =

Barnstaple by-election may refer to:

- 1880 Barnstaple by-election
- 1910 Barnstaple by-election
- 1911 Barnstaple by-election
