= Loan Council =

Australian government and state council

The Loan Council is an Australian Commonwealth-state ministerial council that coordinates public sector borrowing, comprising the Commonwealth of Australia and the states and self-governing territories, New South Wales, Victoria, Queensland, Western Australia, South Australia, Tasmania the Australian Capital Territory, and the Northern Territory. The Loan Council now operates under the Financial Agreement between the Commonwealth, States and Territories of 25 February 1994, which is incorporated as a schedule to the Financial Agreement Act 1994, which came into effect on 1 July 1995. The 1994 arrangements made significant changes to the previous arrangements, the main changes being:

- the Commonwealth and the states each nominate a 'Loan Council Allocation' (LCA), which does not need to be approved by the Loan Council,
- the Commonwealth no longer borrows on a state's behalf,
- the states can now enter into whatever financial arrangements they choose and can issue securities in their own names, and
- the Australian Capital Territory and Northern Territory became full-voting members of the Loan Council (they previously had observer status).

The Loan Council consists of the Prime Minister of Australia, the premier of each state and chief minister of each territory. However, in practice each member is represented by a nominee, usually the treasurer of that jurisdiction. The Treasurer of Australia acts as the chair and the Commonwealth Treasury provides secretarial services. Each jurisdiction nominates a Loan Council Allocation for the forthcoming year and the Loan Council normally meets once a year in person (usually in March) to consider the nominations having regard to each jurisdiction's fiscal position and the macroeconomic implications of the aggregate figure; otherwise business of the council is conducted by correspondence. The Commonwealth has a dominant position over the council, having two votes and also a casting vote. Under this arrangement, the votes of six states/territories are required to outvote a Commonwealth proposition.

In the interest of transparency, each jurisdiction is required to publish its Loan Council Allocation estimates, under the 'Uniform Presentation Framework'. The method of public release is the responsibility of each jurisdiction.

== History ==
The Loan Council was established by the Premiers' Conference of May 1923 as a voluntary organisation of Commonwealth and state governments, to co-ordinate Commonwealth and state debt raisings and to avoid each competing against the others for capital funds, three-quarters of which came from overseas (mainly Britain). The arrangements were formalised in 1927 when the Commonwealth and states signed a Financial Agreement. The 1927 Financial Agreement discontinued the per-capita payments system that had existed since 1910, and restricted the borrowing rights of the states by subjecting such borrowing to control by a Loan Council. It also provided for Commonwealth assistance in state debt reduction. Henceforth all governmental borrowing, except for purposes of defence or for 'temporary' purposes, was to be under Loan Council control. The agreement was ratified by all jurisdictions and was incorporated into the Financial Agreement Act 1928.

Due to doubts concerning the constitutionality of this new body, it was agreed that its legality would be put beyond doubt by a constitutional amendment. The 1928 referendum for the purpose was carried by a large majority of voters in all six states to insert a new provision, Section 105A, into the Finance and Trade Chapter of the Australian Constitution.

A test of the Financial Agreement soon came when the Great Depression hit Australia and the Commonwealth and state governments sought to devise a strategy to deal with it. In August 1930, Prime Minister Scullin invited Sir Otto Niemeyer of the Bank of England to advise the premiers. He recommended a traditional deflationary response of balanced budgets to combat Australia's high levels of debt and insisted that interest on loans be met. All state governments other than NSW and the federal government agreed to the strategy, which was called the "Melbourne Agreement". Early in 1931, Jack Lang, Premier of New South Wales, released "the Lang Plan" to combat the Depression as an alternative to the Melbourne Agreement. Key points of the Lang Plan included the reduction of interest owed by Australian governments on debts within Australia to 3%, and the cancellation of interest payments to overseas bondholders and financiers on government borrowings, besides other strategies. As the Commonwealth Government became responsible under the Financial Agreement for state debts, the new UAP government of Joseph Lyons was obligated to pay the interest to the overseas bondholders, and then extract the money from the states. The Commonwealth Government rejected the Lang Plan and Lang refused to pay to the Commonwealth interest and principal that was payable to overseas bondholders, setting the stage for the Lang Dismissal Crisis. To enforce New South Wales’ obligations under the agreement, the Commonwealth passed the Financial Agreement Enforcement Act 1932 to withhold moneys payable to the state and to seize state assets, which the High Court held to be valid.

The 1928 Financial Agreement only authorised borrowings by governments and did not encompass borrowing by Commonwealth and state semi-governmental and local authorities. In 1936, these arrangements were voluntarily brought under Loan Council control, under a 'gentlemen's agreement', to prevent state governments circumventing the council's borrowing limits. This agreement remained in effect until 1984–85 when 'global borrowing limits' were introduced.

== See also ==
- Fiscal imbalance in Australia
- Loans affair
