= 1906 Australian senate elections referendum =

1906 Australian Senate Elections referendum
- 12 December 1906
- Do you approve of the proposed law for the alteration of the Constitution entitled — "Constitution Alteration (Senate Elections) 1906" ?
- Outcome: Amendment Passed

Results
| Choice | Votes | % |
|---|---|---|
| Yes | 774,011 | 82.65% |
| No | 162,470 | 17.35% |
| Valid votes | 936,481 | 89.30% |
| Invalid or blank votes | 112,155 | 10.70% |
| Total votes | 1,048,636 | 100.00% |
| Registered voters/turnout | 2,109,562 | 49.71% |

The Australian referendum of 12 December 1906 approved an amendment to the Australian constitution related to the terms of office of federal senators. Technically it was a vote on the Constitution Alteration (Senate Elections) Bill 1906, which after being approved in the referendum received the royal assent on 3 April 1907. The amendment moved the date of the beginning of the term of members of the Senate from 1 January to 1 July so that elections to the federal House of Representatives and the Senate could occur simultaneously.

The 1906 vote was the first referendum ever held in the Commonwealth of Australia and concerned the first amendment proposed to the constitution since its enactment. The referendum was held in conjunction with the 1906 federal election.

== Overview ==
Prior to the amendment the constitution provided, in section 13, that Senate term would begin on 1 January and end on 31 December. By 1906 it was felt to be unlikely that Senate terms would generally coincide with House of Representatives terms, and that for this reason a change would be beneficial. The proposed amendment provided for Senate terms to begin on 1 July and end on 30 June. Odger's Australian Senate Practice noted that the main reason for the change was to enable simultaneous elections to be held in March, which at the time was considered the most likely period in which Federal elections would be held. The amendment was uncontroversial, dealing with the mechanical matter of how to rotate Senate terms, and Robert Menzies later observed that "as the average voter ... does not care how frequently a Senator rotates, the amendment was carried".

Although the amendment has not hindered the holding of simultaneous elections, it has had one unintended consequence. Because two-thirds of Commonwealth elections have been held in the months between September and December, there have been numerous instances of incoming Senators being required to wait many months before taking their seats. Those elected on 3 October 1998, for instance, were required to wait 270 days before doing so, and those elected on 21 August 2010 were required to wait 314 days before doing so.

== Question ==
Do you approve of the proposed law for the alteration of the Constitution entitled Constitution Alteration (Senate Elections) 1906?

== Changes to the text of the constitution ==
The following changes were made to the constitution following the result of the referumdum (removed text stricken through; substituted text in bold):

Section 13

As soon as may be after the Senate first meets and after each first meeting of the Senate following a dissolution thereof, the Senate shall divide the senators chosen for each State into two classes, as nearly equal in number as practicable and the places of the senators of the first class shall become vacant at the expiration of ~~the third year~~ three years, and the places of those of the second class at the expiration of ~~the sixth year~~ six years, from the beginning of their term of service and afterwards the places of senators shall be vacant at the expiration of six years from the beginning of their term of service.
The election to fill vacant places shall be made ~~in the year at the expiration of which~~ within one year before the places are to become vacant.
For the purpose of this section the term of service of a senator shall be taken to begin on the first day of ~~January~~ July following the day of his election, except in the cases of the first election and of the election next after any dissolution of the Senate, when it shall be taken to begin on the first day of ~~January~~ July preceding the day of his election.

== Results ==
Result (Note: Handbook of the 44th Parliament (2014) "Part 5 - Referendums and Plebiscites - Referendum results". Parliamentary Library of Australia.)
| State | Electoral roll | Ballots issued | For | | Against | | Informal |
| State | Electoral roll | Ballots issued | Vote | % | Vote | % | Informal |
|---|---|---|---|---|---|---|---|
| New South Wales | 737,599 | 381,019 | 286,888 | 83.85 | 55,261 | 16.15 | 37,929 |
| Victoria | 672,054 | 380,953 | 282,739 | 83.10 | 57,487 | 16.90 | 38,936 |
| Queensland | 271,109 | 124,352 | 81,295 | 76.84 | 24,502 | 23.16 | 15,325 |
| South Australia | 193,118 | 70,479 | 54,297 | 86.99 | 8,121 | 13.01 | 7,892 |
| Western Australia | 145,473 | 52,712 | 34,736 | 78.93 | 9,274 | 21.07 | 6,312 |
| Tasmania | 90,209 | 48,792 | 34,056 | 81.32 | 7,825 | 18.68 | 5,761 |
| Total for Commonwealth | 2,109,562 | 1,058,277 | 744,011 | 82.65 | 162,470 | 17.35 | 112,155 |
| Results | Obtained majority in all 6 States and an overall majority of 581,541 votes. Carried. | | | | | | |

== See also ==
- Referendums in Australia
- Politics of Australia
- History of Australia

Amendments to the Constitution of Australia
| Commonwealth of Australia; Constitution Act (1900) | Senate Elections amendment 1907 | 2nd amendment 1st State Debts amendment (1910) |
