= 1928 Australian state debts referendum =

1928 Australian State Debts referendum
- 17 November 1928
- Do you approve of the proposed law for the alteration of the Constitution entitled — 'Constitution Alteration (State Debts) 1928' ?

Results
Choice	Votes	%
Yes	2,237,391	74.30%
No	773,852	25.70%
Valid votes	3,011,243	93.39%
Invalid or blank votes	213,257	6.61%
Total votes	3,224,500	100.00%
Registered voters/turnout	3,444,766	93.61%

The Constitution Alteration (State Debts) 1928, was an amendment to the Australian Constitution approved by referendum on 17 November 1928. It concerned financial relations between the federal level of government and the Australian states. It became law on 13 February 1929.

The purpose was to ensure the constitutionality of the Financial Agreement, which had been reached by the federal and all state governments in 1927. The agreement discontinued the per-capita payments system that had existed since 1910 and restricted the borrowing rights of the states by subjecting such borrowing to control by a Loan Council.

The referendum was held in conjunction with the 1928 federal election.

== Overview ==
The financial relations between the Commonwealth of Australia and the states worsened during the 1920s. A financial settlement between the governments in 1910 had introduced "per capita grants", whereby each state received annual grants from the commonwealth of 25 shillings ($2.50) per head of its population. By the mid-1920s, inflation had made serious inroads into this sum but no new formula had been found.

The 1927 Financial Agreement, apart from establishing a new grants regime, provided for commonwealth assistance in state debt reduction and, most importantly, established the Loan Council. Henceforth all governmental borrowing, except for purposes of defence, was to be under Loan Council control. Due to doubts concerning the constitutionality of this new body, it was agreed that its legality would be put beyond doubt by the insertion of a new provision, Section 105A, into the Finance and Trade Chapter of the Constitution. The amendment was carried by a large majority of voters, and in all six states.

The Loan Council, described as "a unique institution among federations", attracted overseas attention from the moment of its birth:

if Australia has made a unique contribution to federal finance it lies in its harmonisation of public borrowing by an institutional device [i.e. the Loan Council] which offers a solution for a host of related federal problems-the co-ordination of public investment, economic planning, tax conflicts, and so on.

The Loan Council has had a dramatic impact on Commonwealth-State financial relations, particularly in helping the Commonwealth government oversee the national economy.

== Question ==
Question: Do you approve of the proposed law for the alteration of the Constitution entitled 'Constitution Alteration (State Debts) 1928?

== Changes to the text of the constitution ==
The proposal was to insert a new section 105A to read as follows:

(1.) The Commonwealth may make agreements with the States with respect to the public debts of the States, including-

(a) the taking over of such debts by the Commonwealth;
(b) the management of such debts;
(c) the payment of interest and the provision and management of sinking funds in respect of such debts;
(d) the consolidation, renewal, conversion and redemption of such debts;
(e) the indemnification of the Commonwealth by the States in respect of debts taken over by the Commonwealth; and
(f) the borrowing of money by the State or the Commonwealth, or by the Commonwealth for the States.

(2.) The Parliament may make laws for validating any such agreement made before the commencement of this section.
(3.) The Parliament may make laws for the carrying out by the parties thereto of any such agreement.
(4.) Any such agreement may be varied or rescinded by the parties thereto.
(5.) Every such agreement and any such variation thereof shall be binding upon the Commonwealth and the States parties thereto notwithstanding anything contained in this Constitution or the Constitution of the several States or in any law of the Parliament of the Commonwealth or of any State.
(6.) The powers conferred by this section shall not be construed as being limited in any way by the provisions of section one hundred and five of this Constitution.

== Results ==
The referendum was approved by a majority of voters, and a majority of the voters was achieved in each state. (Note: Handbook of the 44th Parliament (2014) "Part 5 - Referendums and Plebiscites - Referendum results". Parliamentary Library of Australia.)

Result
State	Electoral roll	Ballots issued	For		Against		Informal
State	Electoral roll	Ballots issued	Vote	%	Vote	%	Informal
New South Wales	1,335,660	1,244,918	754,446	60.60	318,412	25.58	74,626
Victoria	1,006,463	953,477	791,425	83.00	110,143	11.55	51,909
Queensland	465,423	435,298	367,257	84.37	47,250	10.85	20,791
South Australia	319,584	301,179	164,628	54.66	98,017	32.54	38,534
Western Australia	203,146	183,475	96,913	52.82	71,552	39.00	15,010
Tasmania	114,490	106,153	62,722	59.09	31,044	29.24	12,387
Total for Commonwealth	3,444,766	3,224,500	2,237,391	69.39	773,852	24.00	213,257
Results	Obtained majority in all states and an overall majority of 1,463,539 votes. Carried						

== See also ==
- Politics of Australia
- History of Australia

Amendments to the Constitution of Australia
2nd amendment 1st State Debts amendment (1910)	2nd State Debts amendment 1928	4th amendment Social services (1946)
