= Margaret Boyd =

English lacrosse player

Personal information
- Nationality: English
- Born: 17 January 1913 Strasbourg, Alsace, Germany
- Died: 21 November 1993 (aged 80) Berkhamsted, Hertfordshire, England

Sport
- Position: Defence wing
- Pro career: 1934–1951

Margaret Boyd OBE (17 January 1913 - 21 November 1993) was an English lacrosse player, administrator and school teacher who founded the International Federation of Women's Lacrosse Associations (today World Lacrosse) in 1972 and was vice-president (later president) of the English Women's Lacrosse Association. She was an educator at Roedean School, a girl's public school in Sussex, then at Berkhamsted School and finally at Wycombe Abbey as the head of physical education and later a housemistress. In lacrosse, Boyd played as a defence wing for Bedford College, Boxmoor Ladies, the East Ladies Lacrosse Association and the England women's lacrosse team, which she captained from 1938 to her retirement from playing in 1951. She worked as a lacrosse coach in the United States and elsewhere for two decades. Boyd was appointed Officer of the Order of the British Empire in 1971 and was inducted into the Lacrosse Hall of Fame in 1993.

== Early life ==
On 17 January 1913, Boyd was born in Strasbourg, Alsace, Germany. She was the daughter and fourth of five children born to the Manchester oil company manager Harold de Haven Boyd and his wife Charlotte Elisabeth, née Austin. Boyd lived in Strasbourg, and was educated firstly at Berkhamsted Girls' School in Hertfordshire and then at Wycombe Abbey in Buckinghamshire, where she learnt lacrosse. She excelled at playing games and could play the piano well. Boyd trained as a physical education teacher at Bedford PE College.

== Career ==
Boyd first educated at Roedean School, a girl's public school in Sussex, and then at Berkhamsted School until the start of the Second World War. During the war, she motorcycled daily to Ashridge Hospital in Ashridge House close to Berkhamsted, working as a qualified physiotherapist there. In 1944, Boyd returned to Wycombe Abbey as a teacher who headed physical education and then as a housemistress until she retired from the school in 1975, although there were occasional staff shortages that required her involvement in teaching. She was the co-ordinator the school appeal, was the head of careers advice, organised the sixth form social work in High Wycombe and had a major role in the seniors (old girls') association.

She played lacrosse as a defence wing, firstly for Bedford College and later for Boxmoor Ladies. In 1934, Boyd was chosen for the East Ladies Lacrosse Association and the England women's lacrosse team. She was the England national captain from 1938 until she retired from playing in 1951. In wartime, Boyd placed advertisements in The Times newspaper that saw lacrosse equipment delivered to schools struggling with supplies and organised coaching sessions for women's service teams in her local area as well as formed "The Occasionals" team. she established the annual five-day national schools' tournament that took place at the conclusion of each season, and in 1949, played on the first official tour to the United States as well as coaching the England touring team.

After she retired from international play, she worked at Winsor School in Boston for three years starting in 1952. Boyd also began coaching lacrosse in Maine and returned there annually on more than twenty trips for more than two decades to coach in summer camps and encouraged other British coaches and players to do likewise; Boyd also coached across the wide range of the East Coast of the United States with clinics she provided to girls, and established a basis for women's lacrosse in the country and brought it to Merestead Camp in Maine. Boyd also coached lacrosse in Wales. When she returned to Britain, she became a lacrosse administrator, serving as vice-president of the English Women's Lacrosse Association between 1955 and 1966 and was its president from 1966 to 1972. In 1959, Boyd authored the book Lacrosse - Playing and Coaching. In 1969, Boyd took a combined British and United States lacrosse team that she organized and managed team—the Pioneers-for their first overseas tour to Australia. They held exhibition matches in Australia, Japan, Hong Kong, New Zealand and the Netherlands.

She founded the International Federation of Women's Lacrosse Associations (today World Lacrosse) in Williamsburg, Virginia in April 1972 and was the organisation's first president before becoming an honorary member. Boyd was an honorary member of the United States Women's Lacrosse Association. She played golf and bridge.

== Personal life ==
On 21 November 1993, Boyd died of heart failure at her home in Berkhamsted. She was unmarried. Following Boyd's funeral at Chilterns Crematorium in Amersham on the afternoon of 1 December, a thanksgiving service for her was held at Wycombe Abbey School Chapel in the afternoon of 23 January 1994.

== Legacy ==
In the 1971 New Year Honours, she was appointed Officer of the Order of the British Empire "for services to women's lacrosse." Boyd was inducted into the Lacrosse Hall of Fame in Baltimore in November 1993. A total of £1,000 was donated from her estate to Wycombe Abbey in her wish that it be used for any seniors requiring financial assistance.
