= Merryn Somerset Webb =

British personal finance journalist

Merryn Rosemary Somerset Webb (born 23 June 1970) is a Senior Columnist at Bloomberg writing about wealth, investing and personal finance and is a radio and television commentator on financial matters.

== Life and career ==
She attended Wycombe Abbey, a boarding school in the UK. After gaining a first class degree in History & Economics as a senior scholar at Gonville and Caius College, Cambridge, Webb was awarded a Daiwa scholarship and spent a year studying for a master's degree in Japanese language at the University of London's School of Oriental and African Studies. In 1992, she moved to Japan to continue her Japanese studies and to produce business programmes for NHK, Japan's public television station.

In 1993, she became an institutional broker for SBC Warburg in Tokyo, where she stayed for five years. Returning to London in 1998, to work for BNP Paribas, she later became a financial writer for The Week. Two years later, in 2000, she took on the role of launch editor for the financial weekly MoneyWeek.

In 2007 she wrote her first book Love is Not Enough, a personal finance book aimed at women. In 2011 she co-presented Superscrimpers for Channel 4. MWbio> "SuperScrimpers will offer viewers top advice on saving the pennies | Channel 4".

In 2013, Somerset-Webb was awarded an honorary doctorate in Business Administration from BPP University for her contribution to financial journalism.

Somerset-Webb is a non-executive director of two investment trusts; the Baillie Gifford Shin Nippon Trust and the Montanaro European Smaller Companies Trust.

In 2022 Somerset-Webb published her second book Share Power,

In 2022 she became a Senior Columnist at Bloomberg writing about wealth, investing and personal finance.

== Awards ==
- CFA UK Financial Journalism Award winner

== Bibliography ==
Somerset Webb, Merryn (20 April 2008). Love is Not Enough: A Smart Woman's Guide to Making (and Keeping) Money. HarperPerennial. ISBN 978-0-00-723519-3.

Somerset Webb, Merryn (20 January 2022). Share Power: How ordinary people can change the way that capitalism works - and make money too. Short Books. ISBN 9781780725192. Archived from the original on 26 January 2022.
