= Proclamation Declaring the Establishment of the Commonwealth of Australia =

Origin of the Australian Constitution

The Proclamation Declaring the Establishment of the Commonwealth was a royal proclamation made by Queen Victoria on 17 September 1900 federating the six separate British colonies of New South Wales, Queensland, South Australia, Tasmania, Victoria and Western Australia under the name of the Commonwealth of Australia. The proclamation, which took effect on 1 January 1901, was issued under the authority granted by the Commonwealth of Australia Constitution Act 1900, an Act of the Parliament of the United Kingdom.

== Text of the proclamation ==
PROCLAMATION UNITING THE PEOPLE OF NEW SOUTH WALES, VICTORIA, SOUTH AUSTRALIA, QUEENSLAND, TASMANIA, AND WESTERN AUSTRALIA IN A FEDERAL COMMONWEALTH.

(Imperial Statutory Rules and Orders, revised 1948, Vol. II., Australia, p. 1027.)
1900 No. 722.

At the Court at Balmoral,
The 17th day of September, 1900.

Present:
The Queen's Most Excellent Majesty in Council.
The following Draft Proclamation was this day read at the Board and approved: – A. W. FITZROY.

By The Queen
PROCLAMATION
WHEREAS by an Act of Parliament passed in the sixty-third and sixty-fourth years of Our Reign intituled, "An Act to constitute the Commonwealth of Australia," it is enacted that it shall be lawful for the Queen, with the advice of the Privy Council, to declare by proclamation that, on and after a day appointed, not being later than one year after the passing of this Act, the people of New South Wales, Victoria, South Australia, Queensland, and Tasmania, and also, if Her Majesty is satisfied that the people of Western Australia have agreed thereto, of Western Australia, shall be united in a Federal Commonwealth under the name of the Commonwealth of Australia:
And whereas We are satisfied that the people of Western Australia have agreed thereto accordingly:
We, therefore, by and with the advice of Our Privy Council, have thought fit to issue this Our Royal Proclamation, and We do hereby declare that on and after the first day of January, One thousand nine hundred and one, the people of New South Wales, Victoria, South Australia, Queensland, Tasmania, and Western Australia shall be united in a Federal Commonwealth under the name of the Commonwealth of Australia.
Given at Our Court at Balmoral, this seventeenth day of September, in the year of Our Lord One thousand nine hundred and in the sixty-fourth year of Our Reign.
God Save The Queen!

== See also ==
- Constitution of Australia
- Constitutional history of Australia
- Federation of Australia
