= Citation of United Kingdom legislation =

Sources of Law in the United Kingdom

Citation of United Kingdom legislation includes the systems used for legislation passed by devolved parliaments and assemblies, for secondary legislation, and for prerogative instruments. It is relatively complex both due to the different sources of legislation in the United Kingdom, and because of the different histories of the constituent countries of the United Kingdom.

== Citation of primary legislation as a whole ==
Each piece of legislation passed by the Parliament of the United Kingdom ("Westminster") is known as an act of Parliament.

Each modern act of Parliament has a title (also known as a "long title") and a short title. A short title provides a convenient name for referring to an individual Act, such as "Jamaica Independence Act 1962". The long title is more comprehensive in scope, providing a sometimes very detailed description of the act's provisions that is too unwieldy for convenient citation; for example, the long title of the Environmental Protection Act 1990 is around 400 words. (Note: An Act to make provision for the improved control of pollution arising from certain industrial and other processes; to re-enact the provisions of the Control of Pollution Act 1974 relating to waste on land with modifications as respects the functions of the regulatory and other authorities concerned in the collection and disposal of waste and to make further provision in relation to such waste; to restate the law defining statutory nuisances and improve the summary procedures for dealing with them, to provide for the termination of the existing controls over offensive trades or businesses and to provide for the extension of the Clean Air Acts to prescribed gases; to amend the law relating to litter and make further provision imposing or conferring powers to impose duties to keep public places clear of litter and clean; to make provision conferring powers in relation to trolleys abandoned on land in the open air; to amend the Radioactive Substances Act 1960; to make provision for the control of genetically modified organisms; to make provision for the abolition of the Nature Conservancy Council and for the creation of councils to replace it and discharge the functions of that Council and, as respects Wales, of the Countryside Commission; to make further provision for the control of the importation, exportation, use, supply or storage of prescribed substances and articles and the importation or exportation of prescribed descriptions of waste; to confer powers to obtain information about potentially hazardous substances; to amend the law relating to the control of hazardous substances on, over or under land; to amend section 107(6) of the Water Act 1989 and sections 31(7)(a), 31A(2)(c)(i) and 32(7)(a) of the Control of Pollution Act 1974; to amend the provisions of the Food and Environment Protection Act 1985 as regards the dumping of waste at sea; to make further provision as respects the prevention of oil pollution from ships; to make provision for and in connection with the identification and control of dogs; to confer powers to control the burning of crop residues; to make provision in relation to financial or other assistance for purposes connected with the environment; to make provision as respects superannuation of employees of the Groundwork Foundation and for remunerating the chairman of the Inland Waterways Amenity Advisory Council; and for purposes connected with those purposes.)

Acts are today split between three series, public general acts, local acts, and personal acts, and cited accordingly. Each act within each series is numbered sequentially with a chapter number, identifying it as a chapter of the (notional) statute book. Since 1 January 1963, chapter numbers in each series are organised by calendar year. The first public general act passed in a year is "c. 1", the second is "c. 2", and so on; the first local act of a year is "c. i", the second is "c. ii", and so on; while the first personal act of a year is "c. 1", the second is "c. 2", and so on (note the use of italics).

Chapter numbers for acts passed before the Acts of Parliament Numbering and Citation Act 1962 are not by calendar year, but instead by the year(s) of the reign during which the relevant parliamentary session was held; thus the Jamaica Independence Act 1962 is cited as "10 & 11 Eliz. 2. c. 40", meaning the 40th (public) act passed during the session that started in the 10th year of the reign of Elizabeth II and which finished in the 11th year of that reign. The regnal numeral – the 2 of Eliz. 2 – is an Arabic rather than a Roman numeral, although historically this was not the case.

Earlier practice was to specify the parliamentary session by the year in which it started only – and sometimes to date its acts accordingly. So, for example, the Adventurers' Act was passed by the session 16 Cha. 1 in 1642 and is cited as 16 Cha. 1. c. 33. That session began in 1640. In consequence the act is often referred to as the Adventurers' Act 1640: despite being passed in response to events in 1641.

Short titles were only introduced in the middle of the 19th century, and it was only by the late 1890s that every individual act of Parliament had one. Some earlier acts that originally lacked a short title were given one by later legislation, most notably by the Short Titles Act 1896; also, since the independence of the Irish state in 1922, an act may have a different short title in the United Kingdom and in the Republic of Ireland because of the different legislation passed in the two states. Older acts may also have a "conventional" short title, such as "Crewe's Act".

=== Historic legislation ===
The Parliament of the United Kingdom came into being on 1 January 1801; before that date, legislation was passed either by the Parliament of Great Britain or the Parliament of Ireland. Similarly, the Parliament of Great Britain came into being on 1 May 1707 (OS); before that date, legislation was passed either by the Parliament of England or the Parliament of Scotland. Acts passed by each of these parliaments, except for the Parliament of Scotland, are cited in the same way as pre-1963 acts of the Parliament of the United Kingdom; i.e., by parliamentary session and chapter number. Acts passed by the Parliament of Scotland are cited by calendar year and chapter number.

Acts of the last session of the Parliament of Great Britain and the first session of the Parliament of the United Kingdom are both cited as "41 Geo. 3". The numbering runs straight through, effectively merging the sessions: that is, the numbers for the Parliament of Great Britain's acts continue unbroken from the numbers for the Parliament of England's.

Some individual acts from these parliaments have more than one citation, depending on the edition in which the act is printed. Modern practice for the parliaments of England and Great Britain is to follow the citations used in The Statutes of the Realm, while for Scotland the citations used are those in The Acts of the Parliaments of Scotland (both of which are considered legally authoritative). These latter citations are also used in the official Chronological Table of the Statutes.

Only a small number of acts passed by these parliaments have been given a short title by later legislation.

=== Primary legislation passed by devolved bodies ===
All legislation passed by the various devolved parliaments and assemblies has both a short title and a long title.

==== Parliament of Northern Ireland (1921 to 1972) ====
Each piece of legislation passed by the former Parliament of Northern Ireland (Stormont) was also known as an act of Parliament. The system of citation of Northern Ireland acts of Parliament is almost identical to that for the Westminster Parliament, except that the change to numbering by calendar year happened earlier (starting in 1943), and that Northern Ireland Acts are cited in Westminster legislation with "(N.I.)" appended to the chapter number.

There is a difference in naming convention between acts passed in Northern Ireland and acts passed at Westminster but relating to Northern Ireland. Thus, the Criminal Evidence Act (Northern Ireland) 1923 is an act passed at Stormont, but the Criminal Appeal (Northern Ireland) Act 1930 is an act passed at Westminster (note the different placement of "(Northern Ireland)" in the two).

==== Northern Ireland Assembly (since 1999) ====
Acts of the Northern Ireland Assembly are cited by calendar year and chapter number; e.g. the Autism Act (Northern Ireland) 2011 is "2011 c. 27 (N.I.)".

==== Scottish Parliament (since 1999) ====
Acts of the Scottish Parliament are cited by calendar year and the acronymic "asp" number; e.g., the Abolition of Feudal Tenure etc. (Scotland) Act 2000 is "2000 asp 5".

==== National Assembly for Wales (since 1999) ====
Measures of the National Assembly for Wales (2003–2011) are cited by calendar year and the acronymic "nawm" number; e.g., the Welsh Language (Wales) Measure 2011 is "2011 nawm 1" ("2011 mccc 1" in Welsh).

Acts of the National Assembly for Wales (2012–2020) are cited by calendar year and acronymic "anaw" number; e.g. the National Assembly for Wales (Official Languages) Act 2012 is "2012 anaw 1" ("2012 dccc 1" in Welsh).

Acts of the Senedd Cymru (2020–) are cited by calendar year and acronymic "asc" number; e.g. the Wild Animals and Circuses (Wales) Act 2020 is "2020 asc 2" ("2020 dsc 2" in Welsh).

==== Church of England legislation (since 1920) ====
Measures passed by the General Synod of the Church of England (formerly the Church Assembly) follow the numbering conventions used for Westminster legislation, except that each measure has a "number" rather than a chapter number. For example, the New Parishes Measure 1943 is cited as "6 & 7 Geo. 6 No. 1".

== Citation of secondary legislation as a whole ==
With the exception of Northern Ireland secondary legislation, each piece of secondary legislation made in the United Kingdom since 1948 has been numbered as a statutory instrument (or SI). Most individual SIs have what is generally referred to as a "short title" (despite none having a "long title"). Each SI is centrally registered and issued with a number; the numbering resumes from "1" at the start of each calendar year. Thus, the Northern Ireland Negotiations (Referendum) Order 1998 is cited as "SI 1998 No. 1126", or more simply as "SI 1998/1126". Commencement orders are also numbered separately as part of a "C." sub-series; this number is appended to the main number. Statutory Instruments relating to Scotland were similarly numbered as part of an "S." sub-series until the series of Scottish statutory instruments began (for which, see below).

The system for statutory rules and orders in place from 1894 to 1947 was less comprehensive. However, those instruments centrally registered and issued with a number follow the same pattern; thus the Trinidad and Tobago (Constitution) Order in Council 1950 is numbered as "SI 1950 No. 510".

The annual volumes of SIs before 1961, and all those for SR&Os, were organised by subject matter rather than by instrument number. This means that these instruments should ideally be cited by both number and page reference; thus the full citation for the Trinidad and Tobago (Constitution) Order in Council 1950 would be "SI 1950 No. 510 (SI 1950 Vol. II p. 1156)".

Some prerogative instruments are also printed in appendices to the annual volumes of SIs. These instruments are not numbered, and are thus cited by page number only; e.g., the Fiji (Appeal to Privy Council) Order in Council 1950 is cited as "SI 1950 Vol. II p. 1555".

Older secondary legislation frequently lacks a short title. An example of an incorrect citation as a result of this can be found in regulation 3 of the Cremation (Amendment) Regulations 2006 (SI 2006/92). Reference is made to "the Regulations as to Cremation (1930)", but the Joint Committee on Statutory Instruments, the body which oversees SI drafting, noted that the correct way to cite these regulations would have been, "the Regulations made by the Secretary of State under section 7 of the Cremation Act 1902 and section 10 of the Births and Deaths Registration Act 1926 and dated 28th October 1930". This longer form of citation was used when the 1930 regulations were revoked by schedule 2 to the Cremation (England and Wales) Regulations 2008 (SI 2008/2841).

=== Scottish statutory instruments ===
A statutory instrument made by the Scottish Government is called a Scottish statutory instrument (or SSI). Each of these is separately numbered, with the numbering resuming from "No. 1" at the start of each calendar year; thus the Radioactive Substances Exemption (Scotland) Order 2011 is cited as "SSI 2011 No. 147", or more simply as SSI 2011/147.

Acts of Sederunt made by the Court of Session or Acts of Adjournal made by the High Court of Justiciary are numbered as Scottish statutory instrument.

=== Welsh statutory instruments ===
A statutory instrument made by the Welsh Government is called a Welsh statutory instrument. Each of these is numbered as part of the sequence of UK SIs but is also numbered separately as part of a "W." series, with the numbering resuming from "W. 1" at the start of each calendar year. Thus, the Isle of Anglesey (Electoral Arrangements) Order 2012 is cited as "SI 2012 No. 2676 (W. 290)" ("OS 2012 Rhif 2676 (Cy. 290) in Welsh).

=== Statutory instruments relating to Northern Ireland ===
Statutory instruments made by Order in Council as primary legislation for Northern Ireland are numbered as part of the main UK series of SIs, but are also numbered separately as part of an "NI" series, with the numbering resuming from "NI 1" at the start of each calendar year. Legislation passed by the Northern Ireland Assembly cites these instruments by the "NI" number only.

Secondary legislation made by the Northern Ireland Executive is numbered sequentially as part of the statutory rules of Northern Ireland, with the numbering resuming from "No. 1" at the start of each calendar year. The numbering mirrors that used for the UK's main series of SIs; thus the Prohibition of Traffic (Ardoyne, Belfast) Order (Northern Ireland) 2011 is cited as "SR 2011 No. 270". Previously this type of secondary legislation was numbered as "Statutory Rules and Orders (Northern Ireland)".

== Citation of specific provisions within an act or other instrument ==
=== Primary legislation ===
Each distinct "enactment" within an act of Parliament is called a section (abbreviated "s.", plural "ss."). Each section has a distinct number, in continual sequence from "s. 1" (section one) onwards. If a section is subdivided or has subordinate elements, then these are known as subsections, each of which has a bracketed number; e.g., "s. 1(4)" is subsection 4 of section 1. Subsections are subdivided in turn into paragraphs, which are identified by an italicised letter; e.g., "s. 1(4)(c)". Subparagraphs are identified with lower-case Roman numerals; e.g., "s. 1(4)(c)(viii)". The section sign is not used in citation.

In schedules to an act of Parliament, each distinct numbered element is called a paragraph (abbreviated "para."), which is subdivided in turn into subparagraphs.

The sections within a lengthy or complex act are sometimes grouped together for convenience to form a Part. A "Part" may in turn be subdivided into "chapters". Other groupings are occasionally found as well.

When an amendment to an act requires the insertion of a new section part of the way through a numerical sequence, then sequential capital letters are used following the appropriate number; thus, a new section inserted between s. 1 and s. 2 will be numbered "s. 1A".

The terminology for the structure of acts and measures of the devolved parliaments and assemblies follows that used for Westminster legislation.

==== Parliamentary bills ====
During its passage through the Westminster Parliament, each proposed enactment forming part of a bill is known as a clause, rather than as a section. For Scottish legislation, the term "section" is used for bills as for acts of the Scottish Parliament.

=== Secondary legislation ===
The terminology used for the equivalent in secondary legislation of sections of an act of Parliament depends upon the particular type of instrument; however, the numbering system follows the same pattern. A comparison of terms and abbreviations is shown in the table below.

=== Comparative table ===
The naming and citation of provisions included in a schedule is the same across all forms of legislation as the system used for Westminster legislation, and has therefore been omitted from this table.

Type of legislation	Main division (1st level)	Subdivision (2nd level)	Subdivision (3rd level)
Act	Section s. 1	Subsection s. 1(1)	Paragraph s. 1(1)(a)
Order in Council	Article art. 1	Paragraph art. 1(1) or para. 1	Subparagraph art. 1(1)(a)
Order made by a Secretary of State	Article art. 1	Paragraph art. 1(1) or para. 1	Subparagraph art. 1(1)(a)
Rules	Rule rule 1	Paragraph rule 1(1)	Subparagraph rule 1(1)(a)
Regulations	Regulation reg. 1	Paragraph reg. 1(1)	Subparagraph reg. 1(1)(a)

== Interpretation of citations by year, statute, session, chapter, number or letter ==
Section 19(1) of the Interpretation Act 1978 provides:

Where an Act cites another Act by year, statute, session or chapter, or a section or other portion of another Act by number or letter, the reference shall, unless the contrary intention appears, be read as referring-

(a) in the case of Acts included in any revised edition of the statutes printed by authority, to that edition;
(b) in the case of Acts not so included but included in the edition prepared under the direction of the Record Commission, to that edition;.
(c) in any other case, to the Acts printed by the Queen's Printer, or under the superintendence or authority of Her Majesty's Stationery Office.

Section 19(1)(b) refers to the edition commonly known as The Statutes of the Realm.

== See also ==
- Numbering of bills
- Oxford Standard for Citation of Legal Authorities ("OSCOLA")
- The Bluebook, for American citations
- Case citation § England and Wales
- Case citation § Scotland
