= Wycombe Abbey International School of Changzhou =

School in Changzhou, China

Wycombe Abbey School Changzhou
- 常州市武进区威雅实验学校
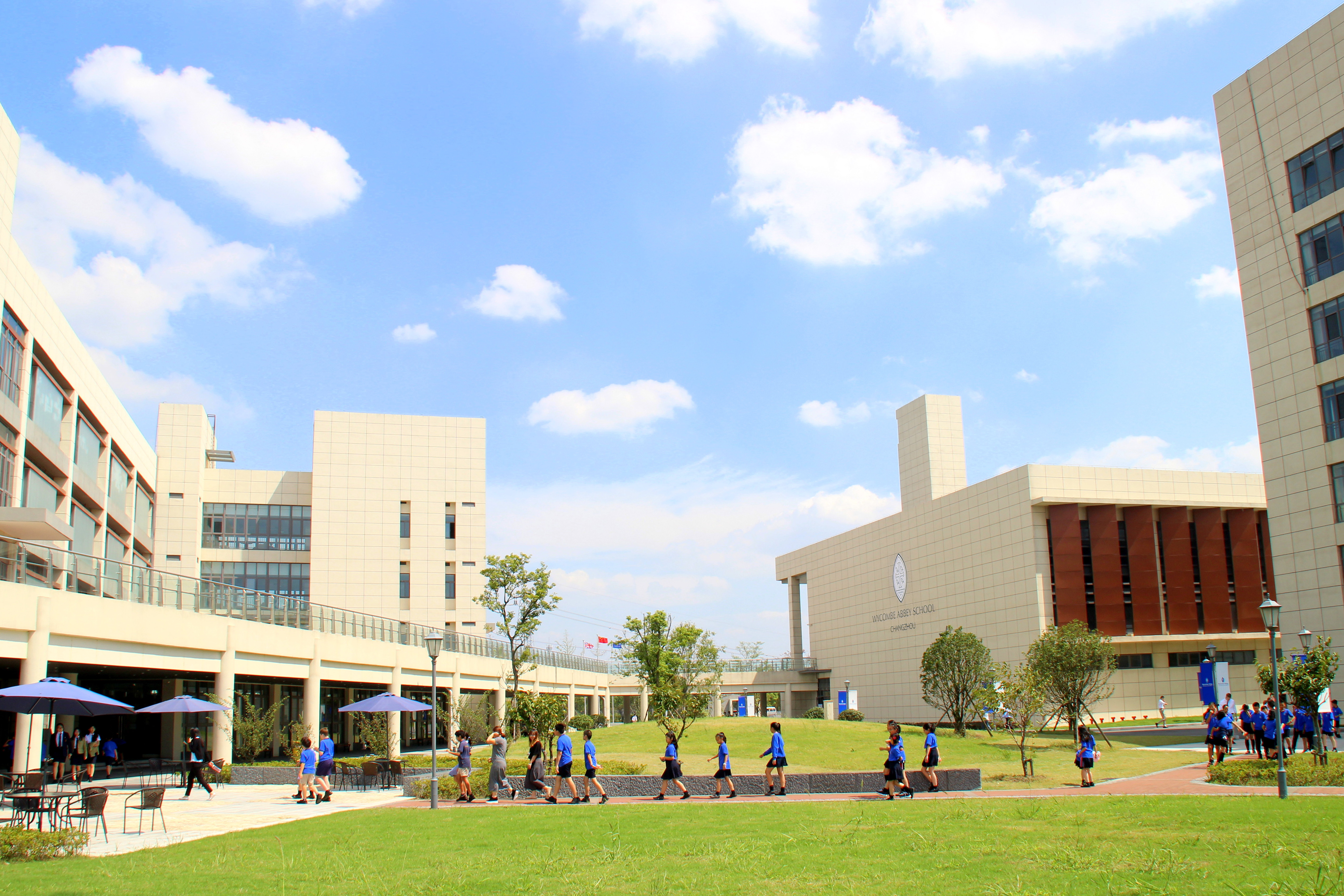
- Oxford International College of Changzhou

Location
- 9 Huanhu North Road, Wujin District, Changzhou, Jiangsu; Changzhou, 213149; China

Information
- Principal: Paul Silverwood
- Years offered: KG - Year 12
- Gender: Co-educational
- Age range: 4-18
- Language: English, Mandarin Chinese
- Nickname: WASCZ
- Website: www.waiscz.com

Wycombe Abbey International School of Changzhou
- Simplified Chinese: 常州市武进区威雅实验学校
- Traditional Chinese: 常州市武進區威雅實驗學校
Transcriptions
Standard Mandarin
- Hanyu Pinyin: Chángzhōushì Wǔjìnqū Wēiyǎ Shíyàn Xuéxiào

Wycombe Abbey School Changzhou (WASCZ; 常州市武进区威雅实验学校, or 常州威雅 in short), formerly Wycombe Abbey School, is a school in Wujin District, Changzhou, China. It is affiliated to Wycombe Abbey School in the United Kingdom.

WASCZ is managed by BE Education and is a boarding school, from kindergarten to year 12. WASCZ aims to prepare students to study abroad, primarily in the United Kingdom and United States by offering both IGCSE and A-Level study programmes. WAISCZ is open to both Chinese and foreign students aged 2–18.

The school moved to its new campus in February 2015. The campus includes teaching buildings, a swimming pool and boathouse, a theatre building, indoor basketball and tennis courts and outdoor sports facilities consisting of a stadium with a grass sports field.

In September 2016, it was rebranded as Wycombe Abbey School and is the first overseas affiliate of Wycombe Abbey School in the United Kingdom. It enrols both male and female students, while the mother school in the UK only enrols female students. As of 2016, the school had students from at least 18 countries, with Chinese students making up about 80% of the student body.

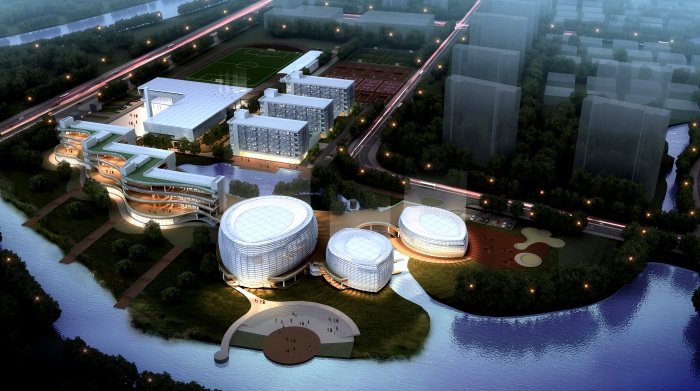
Oxford International College of Changzhou New Campus
