= Diana Magnay =

British journalist

Diana Magnay is a British journalist who is currently an international correspondent for Sky News. Until 2024 she was Sky News' Moscow correspondent.

She was educated at Wycombe Abbey, and holds a BA in modern history from St Hugh's College, Oxford, where she received the Arnold Modern History Prize in 1999, and a master's in war studies at King's College London, where she won the Director's Prize for International Peace and Security. She previously reported for CNN for more than a decade and worked freelance for Channel 4 News. In 2014, CNN moved her out of the Middle East after she referred to a group of Israelis who had allegedly threatened her in Sderot, while she was reporting on Gaza, as "scum" on Twitter; she was subsequently reassigned to Moscow. She joined Sky News in January 2018.
