= 1910 Australian referendum (State Debts) =

Successful proposal

1910 Australian State Debts referendum
- 13 April 1910
- Do you approve of the proposed law for the alteration of the Constitution entitled — "Constitution Alteration (State Debts) 1909" ?
- Outcome: Admentment Passed

Results
Choice	Votes	%
Yes	715,053	54.95%
No	586,271	45.05%
Valid votes	1,301,324	93.12%
Invalid or blank votes	96,209	6.88%
Total votes	1,397,533	100.00%
Registered voters/turnout	2,258,482	61.88%

The referendum of 13 April 1910 approved an amendment to the Australian constitution. The referendum was for practical purposes a vote on the Constitution Alteration (State Debts) Bill 1909, which after being approved in the referendum received the Royal Assent on 6 August 1910.

Upon the establishment of the Commonwealth of Australia, the federal government was given the power to assume any pre-existing debts held by the state governments at that time. The Act altered section 105 of the Constitution to extend this power so that the Commonwealth could take over any debts incurred by a state at any time. On the same day the referendum was held on the state debts amendment, a proposed surplus revenue amendment was also put to the electorate but was defeated.

The referendums were held on the same day as the 1910 federal election, which Alfred Deakin's Commonwealth Liberal Party lost to Andrew Fisher's Labour Party, with Fisher being sworn in as prime minister on 29 April.

== Overview ==
Ensuring the future financial good health of the states was a matter of great importance to the writers of the constitution, and they worked hard to produce a workable Finance and Trade chapter (Chapter IV). Two important provisions of the chapter were section 87, which required the return of surplus tariff funds to the states, and section 105, which provided for the Commonwealth to take over state debts that existed at the time of Federation. By the end of the Commonwealth's first decade it was clear that Chapter IV had serious flaws, and in 1910 attempts were made to amend sections 87 and 105.

In mid-1909, Alfred Deakin succeeded Andrew Fisher as prime minister for what would be his third and final time. Impetus had built in recent years for changes to state-federal financial relations, and Deakin made several important administrative decisions on this matter. Negotiations between Deakin and state premiers produced the financial agreement of 1909, which gave the states per capita grants of 25 shillings annually. Deakin proposed two constitutional amendments at the 1910 ballot to ratify these administrative changes, though the second question was much more pressing than the first. It failed, but in practice the agreement set Commonwealth-State financial relations until 1927. The first question on the state debts proposal dealt with a perceived need to expand the operation of Section 105 to allow the Commonwealth to take over state debts whenever they were incurred.

The state debts amendment was carried by a 'yes' vote of approximately 55 per cent, with only New South Wales in opposition. According to a historian of the Loan Council, this indicated that the nation had "decisively favoured a scheme on the basis of s. 105 to relieve the States of some of their financial burden". Despite the smooth passage of the amendment, it was more than a decade before the specifically endowed powers were used. The state debts amendment was important in giving greater potential flexibility to Chapter IV of the constitution, and became an important aspect of federal-state intergovernmental financial relations.

== Question ==
Do you approve of the proposed law for the alteration of the Constitution entitled 'Constitution Alteration (State Debts) 1909'?

== Changes to the text of the constitution ==
The following changes were made to the constitution following the result of the referumdum (removed text stricken through):

Section 105

The Parliament may take over from the States their public debts ~~as existing at the establishment of the Commonwealth~~, or a proportion thereof according to the respective numbers of their people as shown by the latest statistics of the Commonwealth, and may convert, renew, or consolidate such debts, or any part thereof; and the States shall indemnify the Commonwealth in respect of the debts taken over, and thereafter the interest payable in respect of the debts shall be deducted and retained from the portions of the surplus revenue of the Commonwealth payable to the several States, or if such surplus is insufficient, or if there is no surplus, then the deficiency or the whole amount shall be paid by the several States.

== Referendum results ==
Result (Note: Handbook of the 44th Parliament (2014) "Part 5 - Referendums and Plebiscites - Referendum results". Parliamentary Library of Australia.)
State	Electoral roll	Ballots issued	For		Against		Informal
State	Electoral roll	Ballots issued	Vote	%	Vote	%	Informal
New South Wales	834,662	512,802	159,275	33.34	318,412	66.66	34,060
Victoria	703,699	468,535	279,392	64.59	153,148	35.41	33,824
Queensland	279,031	170,634	102,705	64.57	56,346	35.43	9,971
South Australia	207,655	110,053	72,985	73.18	26,742	26.82	10,252
Western Australia	134,979	83,893	57,367	72.80	21,437	27.20	4,324
Tasmania	98,456	57,609	43,329	80.97	10,186	19.03	3,778
Total for Commonwealth	2,258,482	1,403,976	715,053	54.95	586,271	45.05	96,209
Results	Obtained majority in 5 states and an overall majority of 128,782 votes. Carried.						

== See also ==
- Referendums in Australia
- Politics of Australia
- History of Australia

Amendments to the Constitution of Australia
1st amendment Senate Elections amendment (1907)	1st State Debts amendment 1910	3rd amendment 2nd State Debts amendment (1928)
