= Beverley Lang =

British High Court judge

The Honourable Mrs Justice Lang DBE
- Royal coat of arms of the United Kingdom

Justice of the High Court
- In office 3 October 2011 – 1 May 2026
- Appointed by: Elizabeth II

Personal details
- Born: 13 October 1955 (age 71)
- Education: Lady Margaret Hall, Oxford

Dame Beverley Ann Macnaughton Lang, DBE (born 13 October 1955), styled The Hon. Mrs Justice Lang, was a judge of the High Court of England and Wales.

She was educated at Wycombe Abbey School and Lady Margaret Hall, Oxford. She was called to the Bar at Inner Temple in 1978 and worked as a lecturer at the University of East Anglia from 1978 to 1981. She was appointed a Queen's Counsel in 2000, Recorder from 2006 to 2011, and judge of the High Court of Justice (Queen's Bench Division) since 2011. On 15 March 2012, Lang was appointed to the Order of the British Empire as a Dame Commander (DBE).

She was elected an honorary fellow of Lady Margaret Hall in 2011. She is a granddaughter of Archibald Orr Lang.

Lang retired as a High Court Judge on 1 May 2026.
