= 1910 Australian referendum =

The 1910 Australian referendum was held on 13 April 1910, in conjunction with the 1910 federal election. It contained two referendum questions.

Result (Note: Handbook of the 44th Parliament (2014) "Part 5 - Referendums and Plebiscites - Referendum results". Parliamentary Library of Australia.)
Question	NSW	Vic	Qld	SA	WA	Tas	States in favour	Voters in favour	Result
(2) State Debts	No	Yes	Yes	Yes	Yes	Yes	5:1	55%	Carried
(3) Surplus Revenue	No	No	Yes	No	Yes	Yes	3:3	49%	Not carried

== Results in detail ==
=== State Debts ===
Question: Do you approve of the proposed law for the alteration of the Constitution entitled 'Constitution Alteration (State Debts) 1909'?

Result
State	Electoral roll	Ballots issued	For		Against		Informal
State	Electoral roll	Ballots issued	Vote	%	Vote	%	Informal
New South Wales	834,662	512,802	159,275	33.34	318,412	66.66	34,060
Victoria	703,699	468,535	279,392	64.59	153,148	35.41	33,824
Queensland	279,031	170,634	102,705	64.57	56,346	35.43	9,971
South Australia	207,655	110,053	72,985	73.18	26,742	26.82	10,252
Western Australia	134,979	83,893	57,367	72.80	21,437	27.20	4,324
Tasmania	98,456	57,609	43,329	80.97	10,186	19.03	3,778
Total for Commonwealth	2,258,482	1,403,976	715,053	54.95	586,271	45.05	96,209
Results	Obtained majority in 5 states and an overall majority of 128,782 votes. Carried.						

This section is an excerpt from 1910 Australian referendum (State Debts) § Referendum results

=== Surplus Revenue ===
Question: Do you approve of the proposed law for the alteration of the Constitution entitled 'Constitution Alteration (Finance) 1909'?

Result
State	Electoral roll	Ballots issued	For		Against		Informal
State	Electoral roll	Ballots issued	Vote	%	Vote	%	Informal
New South Wales	834,662	512,802	227,650	47.35	253,107	52.65	31,411
Victoria	703,699	468,535	200,165	45.26	242,119	54.74	24,299
Queensland	279,031	170,634	87,130	54.58	72,516	45.42	9,489
South Australia	207,655	110,503	49,352	49.06	51,250	50.94	9,679
Western Australia	134,979	83,893	49,050	61.74	30,392	38.26	3,890
Tasmania	98,456	57,609	32,167	59.99	21,454	40.01	3,669
Total for Commonwealth	2,258,482	1,403,976	645,514	49.04	670,838	50.96	82,437
Results	Obtained majority in three states and an overall minority of 25,324 votes. Not carried						

This section is an excerpt from 1910 Australian referendum (Surplus Revenue) § Referendum results

== See also ==
- Referendums in Australia
- Politics of Australia
- History of Australia
