= Wycombe Abbey =

Private girls' school in High Wycombe, Buckinghamshire, England

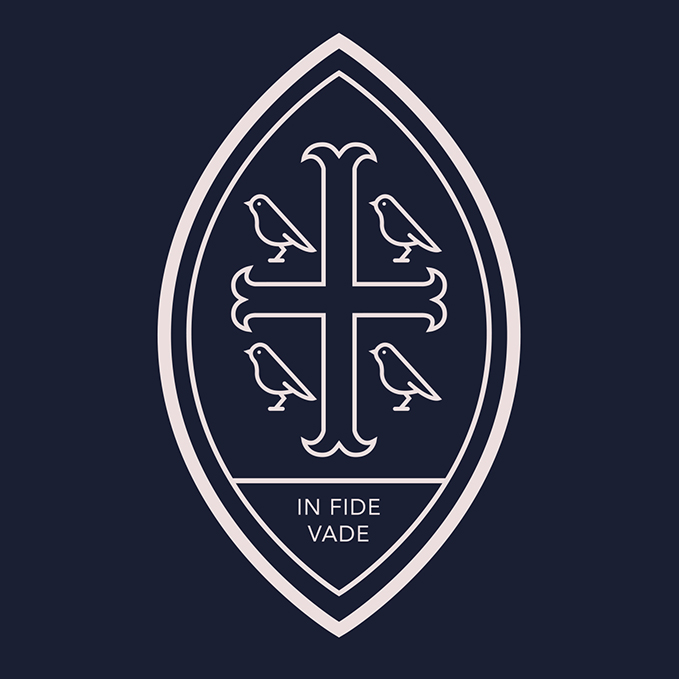

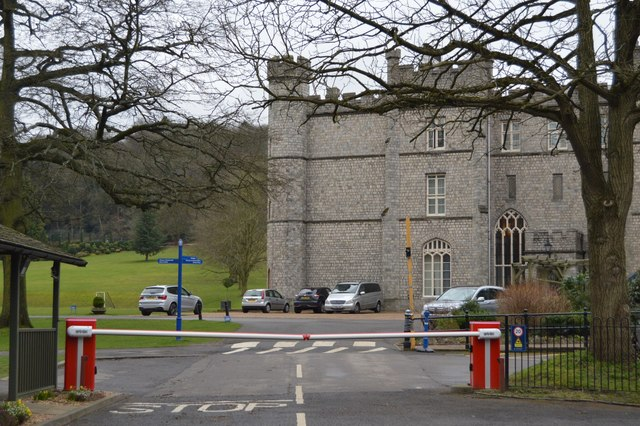
- View of the school at the main entrance

Location
- High Wycombe, Buckinghamshire, HP11 1PE; England; 51°37′34″N 00°45′06″W

Information
- Type: Private boarding school
- Motto: Latin: In fide vade (Go in faith)
- Religious affiliation: Church of England
- Established: 1896
- Founder: Dame Frances Dove
- Department for Education URN: 110547 Tables
- Chairman of the council: Peter Warren
- Headmistress: J. Duncan
- Staff: 117 Teaching; 167 Support
- Gender: Female
- Age: 11 to 18
- Enrolment: 650
- Capacity: Approx. 650
- Houses: 11
- Colour
- Alumnae: Wycombe Abbey Seniors
- Website: www.wycombeabbey.com

Wycombe Abbey (/ˈwɪkəm/ WIK-əm) is a private girls' boarding and day school in High Wycombe, Buckinghamshire, England.

The school was founded in 1896 by Dame Frances Dove (1847–1942), who was previously headmistress of St Leonards School in Scotland. Its present capacity is approximately 650 girls, aged 11 to 18. The current headmistress is Jo Duncan.

The school is on a 69-hectare campus in central High Wycombe. The land includes woods, gardens, a Cold War bunker (RAF Daws Hill) and a lake, and rises up to 150 metres above sea level in the Chiltern Hills. The freehold is owned by the school; the main house and several buildings at Wycombe Abbey are Grade II* listed.

Wycombe Abbey is included in The Schools Index of the world's best 125 private schools and among the top 30 senior schools in the UK.

In the 2023/2024 GCSE examinations, the school achieved 97% 9-7. For the A-level examinations, the school achieved 95% A*-B.

== History ==
=== Early history ===
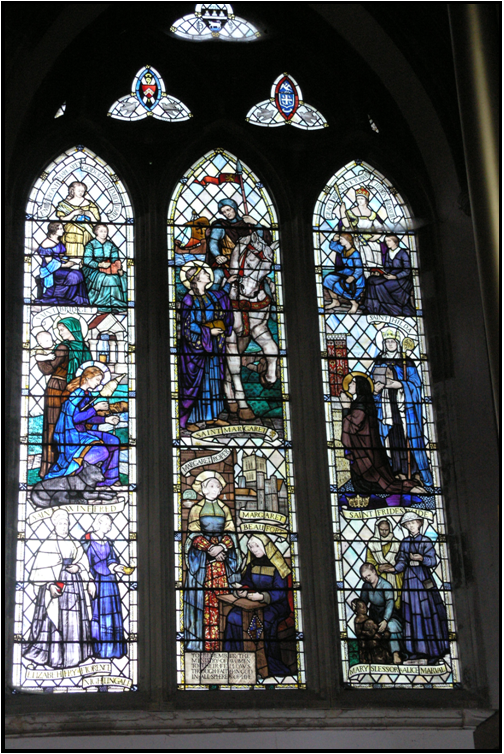
The "Dove Window" in All Saints' Church, High Wycombe, memorialising Wycombe Abbey's founder, Frances Dove

In the 13th century, the area, with the parish church, was part of the holding of the Abbess of Godstow. 600 years later, the priory at Godstowe was also re-founded as a school by Dame Frances Dove, and today is a "feeder" preparatory school for Wycombe Abbey.

On the site of the present Wycombe Abbey was a large manor house known as 'Loakes House' which was the seat of the Archdale family, until 1700, when Thomas Archdale sold it to Henry Petty, 1st Earl of Shelburne. The earl, in turn, bequeathed the estate to his grandnephew, William Petty (who inherited a different Earldom of Shelburne in 1761 and became prime minister in 1782). The Shelburnes, though, had a far larger and grander residence at Bowood House in the Savernake Forest and spent little time at Loakes House.

Consequently, Lord Shelburne sold his estates in the area. Loakes House was purchased from them at auction by Robert Smith, 1st Baron Carrington, in 1798. He employed the architect James Wyatt to transform Loakes House into Wycombe Abbey as we see it today. The original house and other parts of the school are listed Grade II* on the National Heritage List for England with the landscaped grounds of the school listed Grade II on the Register of Historic Parks and Gardens.

=== World War II ===
The Air Ministry requisitioned Wycombe Abbey School (UK) in March 1942 to serve as the headquarters of the United States Eighth Air Force after the entry of the United States into World War II. It was returned to Wycombe Abbey on 9 May 1946.

== International schools ==
There are additional international Wycombe Abbey schools as follows:

- Wycombe Abbey School Changzhou
- Wycombe Abbey School Hangzhou
- Wycombe Abbey School Hong Kong
- Wycombe Abbey School Bangkok
- Wycombe Abbey School Cairo East
- Wycombe Abbey School Singapore

== Notable alumni ==
- Rosie Alison, producer and writer
- Eve Best, actress
- Elsie Bowerman, suffragette, Titanic survivor and lawyer
- Kate Brooke, screenwriter
- Dame Elizabeth Butler-Sloss, British judge, Deputy Coroner of the Queen's Household
- Sue Carr, Baroness Carr of Walton-on-the-Hill, Lady Chief Justice of England and Wales
- Judith Chaplin, Member of Parliament (1992)
- Lorraine Copeland, archaeologist
- Gabrielle Drake, actress
- Penelope Fitzgerald, novelist and biographer
- Jackie Forster, actress, TV personality, feminist and lesbian campaigner
- Caroline Hawley, British journalist
- Elizabeth Haysom, orchestrated the double murder of her parents
- Molly Hide, English cricketer
- Patricia, Lady Hopkins, architect
- Elspeth Howe, Baroness Howe of Idlicote
- India Knight, journalist
- Dorothy Lamb, archaeologist
- Beverley Lang, Justice of the High Court
- Fiona MacCarthy, biographer and cultural historian
- Diana Magnay, journalist
- Charlotte Moore, BBC's Director of Content
- Florence Nagle, trainer and breeder of racehorses, breeder of pedigree dogs, feminist
- Melanie Nakhla, soprano 2 in classical crossover group All Angels
- Lana Nusseibeh, Emirati diplomat
- Winifred Peck (née Knox), English author
- Sally Phillips, actress
- Joan Riviere, psychoanalyst
- Merryn Somerset Webb, editor in chief of MoneyWeek
- Sarah Springman, CBE FREng, engineer and sportswoman, rector of ETH Zurich
- Polly Stenham, playwright
- Rachael Stirling, actress
- Florence Temko, origami pioneer and author
- Mary Wakefield, journalist
- Sonya Walger, actress
- Lady Charlotte Wellesley, socialite and producer
- Kathy Wilkes, philosopher
- Lady Nicholas Windsor, wife of Lord Nicholas Windsor
- Clarissa Ward, chief international correspondent for CNN
- Hester Leggatt, Naval Intelligence secretary
- Ania Magliano, comedian and actress

== Notable staff ==
- Elsie Bowerman, governor and school historian
- Margaret Boyd, physical education teacher.
- Mary Cartwright
- Gustav Holst
- Annie Whitelaw, Head from 1910 to 1925
