= 1910 Connecticut lieutenant gubernatorial election =

- November 8, 1910
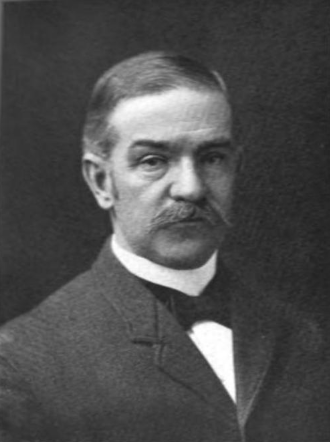

Nominee	Dennis A. Blakeslee	Andrew J. Broughel
Party	Republican	Democratic
Popular vote	78,572	73,903
Percentage	51.50%	48.50%
Lieutenant Governor before election
Vacant
Elected Lieutenant Governor
Dennis A. Blakeslee
Republican

The 1910 Connecticut lieutenant gubernatorial election was held on November 8, 1910, to elect the lieutenant governor of Connecticut. Republican nominee and incumbent member of the Connecticut Senate Dennis A. Blakeslee won the election against Democratic nominee Andrew J. Broughel.

== General election ==
On election day, November 8, 1910, Republican nominee Dennis A. Blakeslee won the election with 51.50% of the vote, thereby retaining Republican control over the office of lieutenant governor. Blakeslee was sworn in as the 74th lieutenant governor of Connecticut on January 4, 1911.

=== Results ===
Connecticut lieutenant gubernatorial election, 1910
Party	Candidate	Votes	%
Republican	Dennis A. Blakeslee	78,572	51.50
Democratic	Andrew J. Broughel	73,903	48.50
Total votes		152,475	100.00
Republican hold			
