= 1910 Texas lieutenant gubernatorial election =

- November 8, 1910
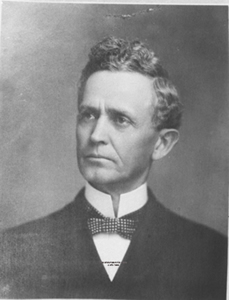

Nominee	Asbury Bascom Davidson	Harris Masterson
Party	Democratic	Republican
Popular vote	176,512	25,866
Percentage	80.85%	11.85%
Lieutenant Governor before election
Asbury Bascom Davidson
Democratic
Elected Lieutenant Governor
Asbury Bascom Davidson
Democratic

The 1910 Texas lieutenant gubernatorial election was held on November 8, 1910, in order to elect the lieutenant governor of Texas. Incumbent Democratic lieutenant governor Asbury Bascom Davidson defeated Republican nominee Harris Masterson, Socialist nominee P. G. Zimmerman, Prohibition nominee Arthur A. Evert and Socialist Labor nominee Robert Strach.

== General election ==
On election day, November 8, 1910, incumbent Democratic lieutenant governor Asbury Bascom Davidson won re-election by a margin of 150,646 votes against his foremost opponent Republican nominee Harris Masterson, thereby retaining Democratic control over the office of lieutenant governor. Davidson was sworn in for his third term on January 17, 1911.

=== Results ===
Texas lieutenant gubernatorial election, 1910
Party	Candidate	Votes	%
Democratic	Asbury Bascom Davidson (incumbent)	176,512	80.85
Republican	Harris Masterson	25,866	11.85
Socialist	P. G. Zimmerman	10,864	4.98
Prohibition	Arthur A. Evert	4,771	2.19
Socialist Labor	Robert Strach	308	0.13
Total votes		218,321	100.00
Democratic hold			
