= Frances Dove =

English women's campaigner

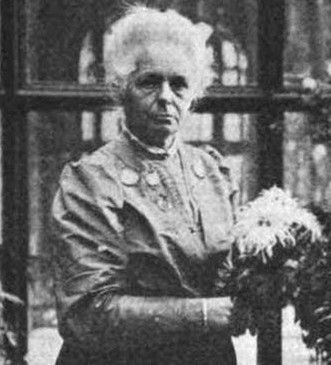
- Born: 27 June 1847
- Died: 21 June 1942 (aged 94)
- Awards: Dame Commander of the Order of the British Empire (1928)

Dame Jane Frances Dove, DBE, JP (27 June 1847 – 21 June 1942) was an English women's campaigner, who founded the girls' schools, Wycombe Abbey and Godstowe.

== Early life and education ==
Born in Bordeaux, France, the eldest of ten children of Revd. John Thomas Dove, vicar of Cowbit, Lincolnshire, Dove attended Girton College, Cambridge. The University of Cambridge did not then award women degrees; she received her MA degree ad eundem from Trinity College Dublin in 1905 as one of the 'steamboat ladies'.

== Career ==
She later became assistant mistress at Cheltenham Ladies' College in 1877. From there she went on to become headmistress of St Leonards School at St Andrews, Scotland, in 1882. She founded Wycombe Abbey in 1896, and was its first headmistress. In 1900 she also founded Godstowe Preparatory School. On retirement from Wycombe Abbey in 1910, she endowed a scholarship at the school.

She was elected in 1907 to High Wycombe Borough Council. In the 1928 New Year Honours, she was made Dame Commander of the Order of the British Empire. She died in 1942, six days before her 95th birthday.

== Legacy ==
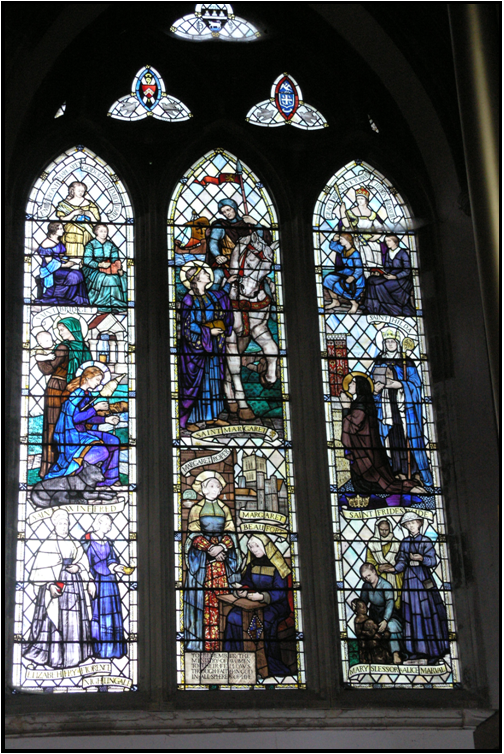
Frances Dove Window in All Saints' High Wycombe. She presented the window to the parish church to pay tribute to the achievement of women through the ages.

She presented the Frances Dove Window at All Saints' Church, High Wycombe, to pay tribute to the achievement of women through the ages. The window was dedicated on Ascension Day in 1933. The stained-glass was designed by Caroline Townshend, a former pupil at Wycombe Abbey.

It depicts famous women:

- In the left panel, Townshend depicted Charlotte Brontë, Emily Davies (the first principal of Girton), St Bridget, St Winifred, Elizabeth Fry (the prison reformer) and Florence Nightingale. They also listed the names of Maude Royden and Dame Millicent Fawcett, both suffragettes, Agnata Ramsay (the first woman to achieve a classics tripos at Cambridge), Mary Kingsley, Hannah More (anti-slavery writer and friend of Wilberforce) and Edith Cavell.
- In the centre panels are depictions of St Margaret, the Scottish Queen, Margaret Roper (daughter to Sir Thomas More), Margaret Beaufort (mother of Henry VII and benefactress of Oxford and Cambridge universities) and Anne Clough (the first principal of Newnham College). Also included are the names Josephine Butler (the social reformer), Octavia Hill (co-founder of the National Trust), Jenny Lind (opera singer), Sophia Jex-Blake (a pioneer of medical education for women), Elizabeth Garrett Anderson (first woman member of the British Medical Association) and Agnes Jones, the nurse praised by Florence Nightingale.
- In the right hand panel are depicted Grace Darling, Queen Victoria, Christina Rossetti and St Hilda together with the names St Frideswide, Mary Slessor (the Scottish missionary), Alice Marval (who died caring for plague victims in India), Amy Johnson and Elsie Inglis, a suffragette who took women’s medical units to serve on the Western Front in the Great War.

== Sources ==
- Alison L. Prentice & Marjorie R. Theobald, Women Who Taught: Perspectives on the History of Women and Teaching (1991)
- Elsie Bowerman, Stands there a School - Memories of Dame Frances Dove, D.B.E., Founder of Wycombe Abbey School (1965)
- Jessie Street (ed. Lenore Coltheart), Jessie Street, a revised autobiography, Federation Press, (2004) (ISBN 1-86287-502-2)
