= 1910 Guatemalan presidential election =

- 11 April 1910
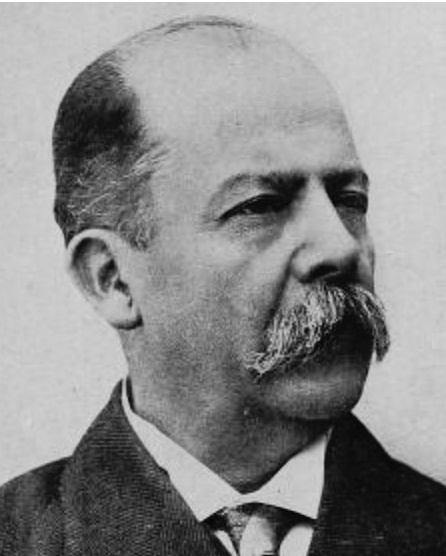
Nominee	Manuel Estrada Cabrera
Party	Liberal
Popular vote	551,145
Percentage	100%
President before election
Manuel Estrada
Liberal
Elected President
Manuel Estrada
Liberal

Presidential elections were held in Guatemala on 11 April 1910. Manuel Estrada Cabrera was re-elected unopposed. His new term started on 15 March 1911.

== Results ==
Candidate	Party	Votes	%
Manuel Estrada Cabrera	Liberal Party	551,145	100.00
Total		551,145	100.00
Source: Rendón

== Bibliography ==
- Villagrán Kramer, Francisco. Biografía política de Guatemala: años de guerra y años de paz. FLACSO-Guatemala, 2004.
- González Davison, Fernando. El régimen Liberal en Guatemala (1871–1944). Guatemala: Universidad de San Carlos de Guatemala. 1987.
- Dosal, Paul J. Power in transition: the rise of Guatemala's industrial oligarchy, 1871–1994. Westport: Praeger. 1995.
- Holden, Robert H. Armies without nations: public violence and state formation in Central America, 1821–1960. New York: Oxford University Press. 2004.
- Taracena Arriola, Arturo. "Liberalismo y poder político en Centroamérica (1870–1929).” Historia general de Centroamérica . 1994. San José: FLACSO. Volume 4.
- Rendón, Catherine. "El gobierno de Manuel Estrada Cabrera". Historia general de Guatemala. 1993–1999. Guatemala: Asociación de Amigos del País, Fundación para la Cultura y el Desarrollo. Volume 5. 1996.
