= 1910 Barnstaple by-election =

UK parliamentary by-election

The 1910 Barnstaple by-election was a parliamentary by-election held for the House of Commons constituency of Barnstaple in North Devon on 2 March 1910.

== Vacancy ==
The by-election was caused by the appointment of the sitting Liberal MP, Ernest Soares as Junior Lord of the Treasury, i.e. one of the government whips. Under the Parliamentary rules of the day applicable to the appointment of ministers, Soares had to resign and fight a by-election.

== Candidates ==
Despite having cut the Liberal majority in Barnstaple from 2,045 in the 1906 general election to just 882 in January 1910, the Unionists decided not to oppose Soares’ re-election. The feeling in the constituency was reported to the party leadership in London as being against another contest in view of what was regarded as the uncertainty of the political situation and the strong possibility of another general election in the near future.

== The result ==
There being no other candidates putting themselves forward Soares was returned unopposed.

Barnstaple by-election, 1910
Party	Candidate	Votes	%	±%
Liberal	Ernest Soares	Unopposed	N/A	N/A
Liberal hold		Swing	N/A	

== See also ==
- List of United Kingdom by-elections
- United Kingdom by-election records
