= Prerogative instrument =

A prerogative instrument is a legal instrument issued under the royal prerogative, in contrast with a Statutory Instrument (which is made under the authority of an Act of Parliament).

Examples of prerogative instruments include letters patent (including most royal charters), royal instructions, royal warrants, and some orders in council.

In the UK, the use of prerogative instruments has declined considerably both as a result of the transfer of political power from the Sovereign to the House of Commons, and with the expanded use since the nineteenth century of delegated legislation under the authority of parliament. An example of a prerogative instrument in Australia is the constitution of the Order of Australia.

Prerogative instruments were often used as the basis for the constitutions of British colonies.

== See also ==
- Prerogative writ
