= Norman Chinner =

Australian organist and conductor

Norman Chinner OBE LRSM (7 August 1909 – 5 November 1961) was a South Australian organist and choirmaster.

== History ==
Chinner was born in Malvern, South Australia, a son of Charles Williams Chinner (18 July 1866 – 21 March 1953) and Winnifred Maud "Winnie" Chinner née Cowperthwaite ( –1964), a daughter of Rev. John Cowperthwaite (c. 1847–1904).

Music was in his family: his mother was a distinguished Elder Conservatorium violinist and singer, and a member of the South Australian Orchestra. His uncle W. B. Chinner was a noted church organist, teacher and composer, and his grandfather George Williams Chinner ( – 27 May 1880) was sufficiently respected as a musician to be on the panel of judges which in 1859 selected Carl Linger's composition to accompany Caroline Carleton's Song of Australia. It is possible Norman's father was also an organist.

Chinner received his initial musical training from Mrs. Smedley Palmer AMUA (née Ethel Rose Ridings, died 1966, and mother of concert pianist Peggy Palmer), and in piano from Miss A. Hodge, then in 1926 began taking organ lessons from Fred Pilgrim (1885–1942), organist at the Flinders Street Baptist Church for 13 years then at Malvern Methodist Church, where Chinner took his lessons.

He was educated at Prince Alfred College. In 1928 he won the Elder scholarship for organ playing. In 1932 he was admitted Licentiate of the Associated Board of the Royal Academy and College of Music, London (LRSM), the first organist in South Australia to be so accredited, and that same year appointed organist and choirmaster of Kent Town Methodist Church. In 1934 he was appointed music master at Prince Alfred College, which he served concurrently with his church duties until May 1939 when he resigned, to be replaced by Arthur Brewster Jones. He also found time to write a few pieces of his own: his A Mood Fantasy was played by Harold Wylde on the Town Hall organ in October 1934. He returned to the Malvern Methodist Church, where he served as choirmaster and organist for four years, before taking on the same roles at the Pirie Street Methodist Church in 1939.

From 1937 to 1939 he lectured on musical appreciation at the Adelaide Technical High School. From January 1938 Chinner was employed by the Australian Broadcasting Commission as deputy conductor (to William Cade) of the Adelaide Wireless Chorus, remembered for their Sunday evening programme In Quires and Places (Where They Sing), and the Adelaide Studio Orchestra. In 1945 their functions were separated: Cade was given the orchestra and Chinner made choirmaster. In 1946 the Adelaide Singers supplanted the Adelaide Wireless Chorus, and their broadcasts when relayed interstate generated considerable interest.

In 1941 Chinner succeeded John Dempster as conductor of the Adelaide Philharmonic Choir, which became one of Australia's finest, in March 1946 notably performing Mendelssohn's Elijah at the Town Hall, with the Adelaide Symphony Orchestra and the noted bass-baritone Harold Williams in the title role.

In the 1950s he made several highly praised appearances as guest conductor in other Australian capital cities:

- Messiah with the Hurlstone Choral Society and the Sydney Symphony Orchestra at the Sydney Town Hall on 19 December 1951. and reprised on 23 December 1952.
- The Song of Hiawatha with the Queensland State and Municipal Choir in the Brisbane City Hall on 13 June 1953.
- Messiah with the Royal Philharmonic Society and the Victorian Symphony Orchestra at the Melbourne Town Hall on 20 December 1952.

Chinner was involved with Robert Dalley-Scarlett's programme of recordings to celebrate Queen Elizabeth II's coronation. He supervised the public musical performances given during her visit to Adelaide in 1954, and a similar programme for the Queen Mother's visit in 1958.

In 1955 the ABC recorded a set of Australian Christmas Carols, composed by William G. James, lyrics by John Wheeler, with the Adelaide Singers conducted by Chinner and the South Australian Symphony Orchestra conducted by Patrick Thomas.

Chinner died of a coronary occlusion on 5 November 1961 at the Netherby home of his sister. His remains were buried in Centennial Park Cemetery.

== Family ==
Chinner married actress Cecilia Sands (c. 1928– ) on 1 August 1953. They separated soon afterwards and divorced in 1959.

== Recognition ==
- He was appointed O.B.E. in the 1957 New Year Honours list.
- Chinner Crescent, a street in Melba, ACT, Canberra, was named for him.
