= Chinner =

Chinner is an English surname shared by several notable people:

- Hubert Chinner (1870–1953), South Australian cricketer
- John Henry Chinner (1865–1933), South Australian caricaturist
- Norman Chinner (1909–1961), South Australian organist and choirmaster, grandson of William
- William Bowen Chinner (1850–1915), South Australian organist, choirmaster, teacher and composer
