= 1977 Australian referendum =

Public vote in Australia containing a total of five questions

The 1977 Australian referendum was held on 21 May 1977. It contained four referendum questions and one non-binding plebiscite. To date, it is the most recent referendum to have been successful in Australia.

Result (Note: Handbook of the 44th Parliament (2014) "Part 5 - Referendums and Plebiscites - Referendum results". Parliamentary Library of Australia.)
Question	NSW	Vic	Qld	SA	WA	Tas	States in favour	Voters in favour	Result
(33) Simultaneous Elections	Yes	Yes	No	Yes	No	No	3:3	62.2%	Not carried
(34) Senate Casual Vacancies	Yes	Yes	Yes	Yes	Yes	Yes	6:0	73.3%	Carried
(35) Referendums	Yes	Yes	Yes	Yes	Yes	Yes	6:0	77.7%	Carried
(36) Retirement of Judges	Yes	Yes	Yes	Yes	Yes	Yes	6:0	80.1%	Carried

This referendum had a particularly strong "Yes" vote. All but one of the referendum questions were carried, and the only one not carried had a clear national majority, but was held back by not achieving a majority of the states. No referendum since then has been successful. (Note: The 2017 Australian Marriage Law Postal Survey returned a majority of "yes" votes in all states (and thus nationally) but – not being compulsory – was not a referendum.)

Plebiscite
Question	NSW	Vic	Qld	SA	WA	Tas	ACT	NT	Total voters
National Song	Advance Australia Fair	Advance Australia Fair	Advance Australia Fair	Song of Australia	Advance Australia Fair	Advance Australia Fair	Waltzing Matilda	Advance Australia Fair	Advance Australia Fair

The four referendum questions were only voted on in the states; voters in the territories only gained the right to vote on constitutional changes as a result of the Referendums amendment passing. Voters in the territories, however, were able to vote on the plebiscite.

== Results in detail ==
=== Simultaneous Elections ===
Result
State	Electoral roll	Ballots issued	For		Against		Informal
State	Electoral roll	Ballots issued	Vote	%	Vote	%	Informal
New South Wales	3,007,511	2,774,388	1,931,775	70.71	800,331	29.29	42,282
Victoria	2,252,831	2,083,136	1,325,708	65.00	713,929	35.00	43,499
Queensland	1,241,426	1,138,842	534,968	47.51	590,942	52.49	12,932
South Australia	799,243	745,990	480,827	65.99	247,762	34.01	17,401
Western Australia	682,291	617,463	292,344	48.47	310,765	51.53	14,354
Tasmania	259,081	246,063	82,785	34.26	158,818	65.74	4,460
Total for Commonwealth	8,242,383	7,605,882	4,648,407	62.22	2,822,547	37.78	134,928
Results	Obtained majority in three states and an overall majority of 1,825,860 votes. Not carried						

This section is an excerpt from 1977 Australian referendum (Simultaneous Elections) § Results

=== Senate Casual Vacancies ===
Result
State	Electoral roll	Ballots issued	For		Against		Informal
State	Electoral roll	Ballots issued	Vote	%	Vote	%	Informal
New South Wales	3,007,511	2,774,388	2,230,218	81.62	502,171	18.38	41,999
Victoria	2,252,831	2,083,136	1,552,558	76.13	486,798	23.87	43,780
Queensland	1,241,426	1,138,842	662,732	58.86	463,165	41.14	12,945
South Australia	799,243	745,990	557,950	76.59	170,536	23.41	17,504
Western Australia	682,291	617,463	344,389	57.11	258,655	42.89	14,419
Tasmania	259,081	246,063	129,924	53.78	111,638	46.22	4,501
Total for Commonwealth	8,242,383	7,605,882	5,477,771	73.32	1,992,963	26.68	135,148
Results	Obtained majority in all six states and an overall majority of 3,484,808 votes. Carried						

This section is an excerpt from 1977 Australian referendum (Senate Casual Vacancies) § Results

=== Referendums ===
Result
State	Electoral roll	Ballots issued	For		Against		Informal
State	Electoral roll	Ballots issued	Vote	%	Vote	%	Informal
New South Wales	3,007,511	2,774,388	2,292,822	83.92	439,247	16.08	42,319
Victoria	2,252,831	2,083,136	1,647,187	80.78	391,855	19.22	44,094
Queensland	1,241,426	1,138,842	670,820	59.58	455,051	40.42	12,971
South Australia	799,243	745,990	606,743	83.29	121,770	16.71	17,477
Western Australia	682,291	617,463	437,751	72.62	165,049	27.38	14,663
Tasmania	259,081	246,063	150,346	62.25	91,184	37.75	4,533
Total for Commonwealth	8,242,383	7,605,882	5,805,669	77.72	1,664,156	22.28	136,057
Results	Obtained majority in all six States and an overall majority of 4,141,513 votes. Carried						

This section is an excerpt from 1977 Australian referendum (Inclusion of territories) § Results

=== Retirement of Judges ===
Result
State	Electoral roll	Ballots issued	For		Against		Informal
State	Electoral roll	Ballots issued	Vote	%	Vote	%	Informal
New South Wales	3,007,511	2,774,388	2,316,999	84.84	414,070	15.16	43,319
Victoria	2,252,831	2,083,136	1,659,273	81.43	378,505	18.57	45,358
Queensland	1,241,426	1,138,842	734,183	65.24	391,227	34.76	13,432
South Australia	799,243	745,990	622,760	85.57	104,987	14.43	18,243
Western Australia	682,291	617,463	472,228	78.37	130,307	21.63	14,928
Tasmania	259,081	246,063	174,951	72.46	66,478	27.54	4,634
Total for Commonwealth	8,242,383	7,605,882	5,980,394	80.10	1,485,574	19.90	139,914
Results	Obtained majority in all six States and an overall majority of 4,494,820 votes. Carried						

This section is an excerpt from 1977 Australian referendum (Retirement of Judges) § Results

=== National Song ===
Voters were presented with the following question:

Against the background that 'GOD SAVE THE QUEEN' is the NATIONAL ANTHEM to be played on Regal and Vice Regal occasions, electors may indicate their preferences as to which of the tunes of the songs listed below they would prefer to be played on other occasions.

Result
State	Electoral roll	Ballots issued	"God Save the Queen"		"Advance Australia Fair"		"The Song of Australia"		"Waltzing Matilda"		Informal	
State	Electoral roll	Ballots issued	Vote	%	Vote	%	Vote	%	Vote	%	Vote	%
New South Wales	3,007,511	2,537,805	348,885	15.32	1,169,421	51.35	121,456	5.33	637,795	28.00	260,248	11.43
Victoria	2,252,831	1,951,160	352,603	20.68	683,451	40.09	110,591	6.49	557,991	32.73	246,524	14.46
Queensland	1,241,426	1,056,804	204,453	21.38	438,929	45.90	61,234	6.40	251,609	26.31	100,579	10.52
South Australia	799,243	706,392	114,477	18.07	152,507	24.07	215,085	33.95	151,434	23.90	72,889	11.51
Western Australia	682,291	487,879	113,054	23.17	183,159	37.54	75,524	15.48	116,142	23.81	68,394	14.02
Tasmania	259,081	253,525	47,346	22.38	88,825	41.98	21,091	9.97	54,329	25.68	23,934	11.31
Australian Capital Territory	120,875	22,136	1,448	6.65	7,857	36.11	1,863	8.56	10,593	48.68	375	1.72
Northern Territory	38,209	2,951	423	14.93	1,143	40.35	413	14.58	854	30.14	118	4.17
Total for Commonwealth	8,401,467	7,069,046	1,182,689	18.78	2,725,292	43.29	607,257	9.65	1,780,747	28.28	773,061	12.28
Two-song preferred					4,415,642	65.23			2,353,617	34.77		

This section is an excerpt from 1977 Australian plebiscite (National Song) § Results

== See also ==
- Politics of Australia
- History of Australia
- Referendums in Australia
