= William Holden (journalist) =

Retired Australian journalist

- Born: April 7, 1808; Chichester, Sussex
- Died: 11 October 1897 (aged 89)
- Occupation: Journalist

William Holden (7 April 1808 – 11 October 1897) was a journalist with the South Australian Register, noted for his breadth of knowledge and diverse interests, and remembered as the "Riddler" in The Observer. He retired as the longest-serving and oldest journalist in Australia.

== Early life ==
Holden was born on 7 April 1808 in Chichester, Sussex, and emigrated with his family to the colony of South Australia in the Trusty, arriving 15 May 1838.

From 1841 to 1851 the Holden family lived at Hope Valley, where he opened a butcher's shop and store. The name "Hope Valley" was coined by him when, after fire destroyed his home, he felt optimistic rather than despondent.

== Journalism ==
In 1851 he moved into town, and on 17 November started on his career with The Register as one of only three journalists employed there. And when the rush began to the Victorian goldfields, he was the only reporter left in Adelaide.

Holden became a member of the literary staff. He was a member of the Mathematical Society and the Astronomical Society and would compile the tide tables and statistical information. From 1868 to 1896 he produced for The Observer, the Register's sister publication, on its weekly "Puzzler" page. He was considered a deeply religious and moral thinker, due to his adherence to the New Church.

He was one of the judges appointed by the Gawler Institute to select the music for Caroline Carleton's "Song of Australia".

== Faith ==
During the journey to Adelaide, Holden became a friend of Jacob Pitman, brother of the famous shorthand inventor Isaac Pitman. Pitman was a devout Swedenborgian, and Holden became an adherent, helping Pitman establish a New Church in Hanson Street.

== Later years and death ==
He sustained a severe shaking one Sunday night in 1896 when he was knocked down by a horse-drawn carriage in the city whilst crossing from The Register office to catch the tramcar home. He eventually recovered sufficiently to go out of doors, and though he never returned to his desk at The Register office, he insisted on contributing his literary work from his residence at North Adelaide.

He died peacefully at home some six months short of his 90th birthday, and was buried in the Walkerville Cemetery.

== Family ==
He was married to Sarah née Ellis (1805–1851). He married again to Susan Rosanna Williams (c. 1828 – 15 July 1909). Among his children were:

- George Holden (c. 1833 – 29 November 1911) married Maria Wildy (1838 – 20 August 1919)
- Frances Holden (1836–1876)
- Stephen Trusty Holden (1838 – 8 January 1906) was born on voyage out; married Emily Fry Wilkey (21 November 1846 – 31 May 1927)
- John (c. 1840 – 23 November 1869)
- William (27 January 1844 – )
- Emma Eleanor (17 September 1858 – 28 February 1892) lived Jeffcott Street, then Barton Terrace; taught pianoforte from home after studying under Moritz Heuzenroeder. She also wrote stories for The Register.

They lived at 109 Jeffcott Street until 1881, then 67 Barton Terrace, North Adelaide.
