= 1977 Australian referendum (Senate Casual Vacancies) =

Successful referendum

1977 Australian Senate Casual Vacancies referendum
- 21 May 1977
- It is proposed to alter the Constitution to ensure as far as practicable that a casual vacancy in the Senate is filled by a person of the same political party as the Senator chosen by the people and for the balance of his term. Do you approve of the proposed law?

Results
Choice	Votes	%
Yes	5,477,771	73.32%
No	1,992,963	26.68%
Valid votes	7,470,734	98.22%
Invalid or blank votes	135,148	1.78%
Total votes	7,605,882	100.00%
Registered voters/turnout	8,242,383	92.28%

The Constitution Alteration (Senate Casual Vacancies) Bill 1977, was a successful proposal to alter the Australian Constitution concerning the filling of casual vacancies in the Senate. It was put to voters for approval in a referendum held on 21 May 1977. After being approved in the referendum, it received the royal assent and became law on 29 July 1977.

Prior to the amendment:

- the legislature of the relevant state was not required to have regard to the political allegiances of the replacement senator, and
- the new senator's term continued only until the next general election for either the House of Representatives or the Senate, or the end of the original senator's term, whichever happened earlier.

The amendment changed this procedure by providing that:

- a state legislature replace a senator with a member of the same political party, and
- the new senator's term continue until the end of the original senator's term.

Its intended purpose was to prevent major changes in the balance of power in the senate in the middle of a parliamentary term, but as it did not provide any time limit within which the appointment had to be made, the state legislature remained free to decline to fill the vacancy. As Section 11 of the Constitution permits the Senate to carry on despite the failure to fill any vacancy, the amendment did not completely solve the problem.

On the same day as the vote on the casual vacancies amendment, four other questions were also put to the electorate. These concerned the:

- Simultaneous elections amendment
- Referendums amendment
- Retirement of judges amendment
- National song plebiscite.

== Overview ==
The casual vacancies amendment came about as part of the political fallout from both the Gair Affair and the Australian constitutional crisis of 1975. In the aftermath of this crisis, four amendments were recommended by sessions of the Australian Constitutional Convention, including one that would change the procedure for appointing replacement senators. All four were put to voters on 21 May 1977, and all were passed except the proposal for simultaneous elections to the House of Representatives and Senate.

The casual vacancies proposal arose out of two controversies in the middle of the decade. In 1974 Prime Minister Gough Whitlam had appointed Vince Gair, a Democratic Labor Party Senator to the post of Ambassador to the Republic of Ireland in order to create an additional Senate vacancy in the hope that this would improve Labor's chance of gaining a majority in the Senate at the forthcoming general election. Whitlam's plan was foiled by the Premier of Queensland, Joh Bjelke-Petersen, during what came to be known as "The Night of the Long Prawns", but the matter was overtaken by events when Whitlam decided to call a double dissolution election. The following year saw controversy over the appointment of independent Cleaver Bunton (New South Wales) and anti-Whitlam Australian Labor Party member Albert Field (Queensland) to fill Senate seats formerly held by ALP senators. The appointments ran counter to a longstanding convention that when a Senate seat became open due to a casual vacancy, the state parliament would appoint a replacement recommended by the former senator's party.

The change aimed to ensure that a replacement senator would be required to be a member of the party of which the previous senator was a member at the time of their election. The new Senator would sit for the whole of the remainder of the vacating Senator's term, thereby ending the variable numbers of Senators at elections. The amendment was approved by a 73.3 per cent majority of the electorate.

Despite the intention of the amendment's supporters to ensure that the party balance in the Senate should not be altered by a casual vacancy, the amendment has not been entirely successful in that regard.

Following the resignation of the Tasmanian ALP Senator Don Grimes in April 1987, the nominee of the ALP, John Devereux, was rejected by a tied vote in the Tasmanian Parliament.

Tasmanian Government minister Ray Groom argued: "we can choose only a person who is a member of the same party ... but we are not bound to accept the nomination of the party concerned" (emphasis Groom's). Tasmania therefore had only eleven senators between 2 April and the double dissolution election of 11 July 1987.

== Changes to the text of the constitution ==
Section 15 (before)

If the place of a senator becomes vacant before the expiration of his term of service, the Houses of Parliament of the State for which he was chosen shall, sitting and voting together, choose a person to hold the place until the expiration of the term, or until the election of a successor as hereinafter provided, whichever first happens. But if the Houses of Parliament of the State are not in session at the time when the vacancy is notified, the Governor of the State, with the advice of the Executive Council thereof, may appoint a person to hold the place until the expiration of fourteen days after the beginning of the next session of the Parliament of the State, or until the election of a successor, whichever first happens.

At the next general election of members of the House of Representatives, or at the next election of senators for the State, whichever first happens, a successor shall, if the term has not then expired, be chosen to hold the place from the date of his election until the expiration of the term.

The name of any senator so chosen or appointed shall be certified by the Governor of the State to the Governor-General.

Section 15 (after)

If the place of a senator becomes vacant before the expiration of his term of service, the Houses of Parliament of the State for which he was chosen, sitting and voting together, or, if there is only one House of that Parliament, that House, shall choose a person to hold the place until the expiration of the term. But if the Parliament of the State is not in session when the vacancy is notified, the Governor of the State, with the advice of the Executive Council thereof, may appoint a person to hold that place until the expiration of fourteen days from the beginning of the next session of the Parliament of the State or the expiration of the term, whichever first happens.

Where a vacancy has at any time occurred in the place of a senator chosen by the people of a State and, at the time when he was so chosen, he was publicly recognized by a particular political party as being an endorsed candidate of that party and publicly represented himself to be such a candidate, a person chosen or appointed under this section in consequence of that vacancy, or in consequence of that vacancy and a subsequent vacancy or vacancies, shall, unless there is no member of that party available to be chosen or appointed, be a member of that party.

Where-

(a) in accordance with the last preceding paragraph, a member of a particular political party is chosen or appointed to hold the place of a senator whose place had become vacant; and
(b) before taking his seat he ceases to be a member of that party (otherwise than by reason of the party having ceased to exist),

he shall be deemed not to have been so chosen or appointed and the vacancy shall be again notified in accordance with section twenty-one of this Constitution.

The name of any senator chosen or appointed under this section shall be certified by the Governor of the State to the Governor-General.

[Remaining provisions omitted]

== Question ==
It is proposed to alter the Constitution to ensure as far as practicable that a casual vacancy in the Senate is filled by a person of the same political party as the Senator chosen by the people and for the balance of his term. Do you approve the proposed law?

== Results ==
Result (Note: Handbook of the 44th Parliament (2014) "Part 5 - Referendums and Plebiscites - Referendum results". Parliamentary Library of Australia.)
State	Electoral roll	Ballots issued	For		Against		Informal
State	Electoral roll	Ballots issued	Vote	%	Vote	%	Informal
New South Wales	3,007,511	2,774,388	2,230,218	81.62	502,171	18.38	41,999
Victoria	2,252,831	2,083,136	1,552,558	76.13	486,798	23.87	43,780
Queensland	1,241,426	1,138,842	662,732	58.86	463,165	41.14	12,945
South Australia	799,243	745,990	557,950	76.59	170,536	23.41	17,504
Western Australia	682,291	617,463	344,389	57.11	258,655	42.89	14,419
Tasmania	259,081	246,063	129,924	53.78	111,638	46.22	4,501
Total for Commonwealth	8,242,383	7,605,882	5,477,771	73.32	1,992,963	26.68	135,148
Results	Obtained majority in all six states and an overall majority of 3,484,808 votes. Carried						

== See also ==
- Politics of Australia
- History of Australia
- Casual vacancies in the Australian Parliament

Amendments to the Constitution of Australia
5th amendment Aboriginals Amendment (1910)	Senate Vacancies Amendment; Referendum amendment Retirement of Judges amendment 1977	Most recent amendments
