= My Bougainville =

Anthem of the Autonomous Region of Bougainville in Papua New Guinea

- National anthem of Bougainville
- Music: Carl Linger, 1859
- Adopted: 14 June 2018

Audio sample
- Arrangement by Keith Terret: file; help

My Bougainville is the anthem of the Autonomous Region of Bougainville in Papua New Guinea. The anthem was officially adopted in 2018. It is sung to the tune of "The Song of Australia", the melody of which was composed by Carl Linger.

== Lyrics ==
God bless our lovely homeland
From mountain peaks to golden sands
Land of the brave and land of the free
The brave and the free
Enfold her children in your hands
Beneath the Southern Cross we stand
One mighty Christian family

CHORUS:
Oh Bougainville,
My Bougainville,
Bless Bougainville.

The smile of God upon her face
The pride and joy of all the race
She wears beneath her purple sheen
Her mantle of green
Today we pledge our love and life
We'll stand by you in every strife
Our own dear home, our motherland

CHORUS

== See also ==
- O Arise, All You Sons
