= John Brown (colonist) =

English colonist

John Brown (c. 1801 – 17 August 1879, Adelaide) was an English colonist from London involved in the establishment of the British colony of South Australia.

John was the son of Samuel Brown and Maria Josepha Robinson. He was educated for three years at Mill Hill School and subsequently became a vintner at St Mary-at-Hill. However, after his business failed he became interested in plans to colonise South Australia. He worked with both Thomas Binney and Barzillai Quaife on distinct plans to create the colony on dissenting principles. He provided the South Australian Association with £200 and worked with Richard Hanson on the land report for the South Australian Colonization Commission and with Edward Gibbon Wakefield in preparing information for the select committee as regards the disposal of waste land.

Brown travelled to South Australia in the First Fleet on Africaine with his wife and sister. He worked as immigration agent and as editor of the Adelaide Times, South Australia's second newspaper.

It is likely, but by no means certain, that he was the John Brown Esq. who was member of the panel, with John H. Barrow, John Howard Clark, A. Forster, W. A. Wearing, and E. J. Peake. that selected Caroline Carleton's Song of Australia for the Gawler Institute prize in 1859.
