= William Cade =

Australian musician

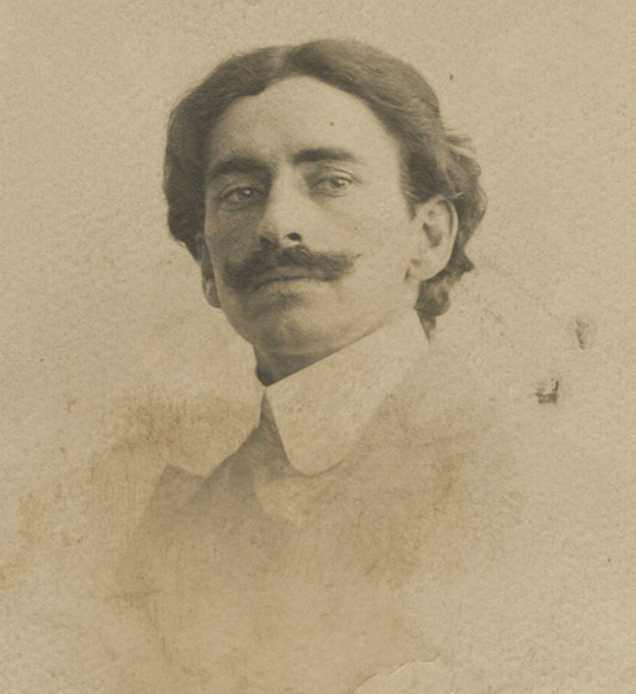

Background information
- Born: 30 June 1883; Adelaide
- Died: 4 August 1957 (aged 74) Adelaide
- Occupation(s): musician and conductor
- Instrument: violin
- Formerly of: Adelaide Symphony Orchestra

William Richard Cade (30 June 1883 – 4 August 1957), also known as Bill Cade, was an Australian violinist and conductor, the founding conductor of the Adelaide Symphony Orchestra.

== History ==
Cade was born in Adelaide and educated at the Pulteney Street School (now Pulteney Grammar School).

He studied at the Elder Conservatorium from 1899 to 1909, under Hermann Heinicke. From 1904 to 1910 he was a violinist and music teacher. He studied at the Max Pohl Conservatorium in Berlin in 1910, became the leader of the Quinlan Opera Company orchestra in London in 1911, and also studied with Sir Thomas Beecham. He returned to Adelaide in 1912 and married that year. For the next 16 years he was associated with J. C. Williamson's company, while also conducting cinema orchestras and the Theatre Royal Orchestra. In 1929 he moved to Melbourne to lead the Regent and Plaza Theatres' orchestras, conducting over 7,000 times, and also became conductor of the Victorian Professional Symphony Orchestra, a group of 80 players. In 1929 he formed the Adelaide Wireless Chorus (later renamed the Adelaide Singers).

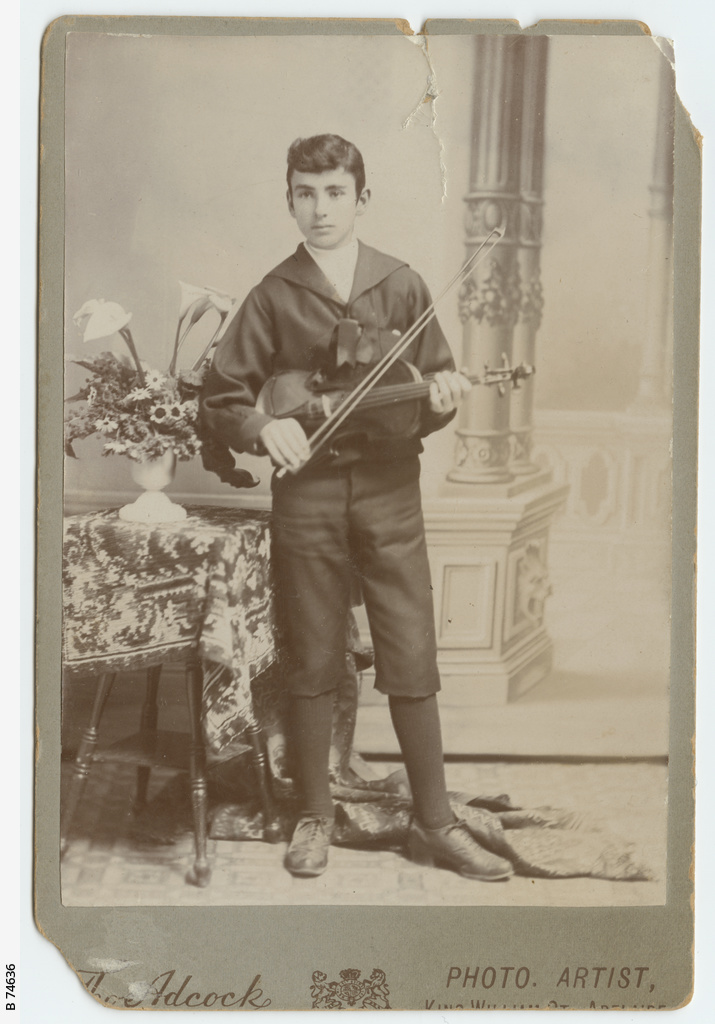
Studio portrait by of William Richard Cade as a boy of about 13, holding a violin.

In 1936, he was the conductor of the Adelaide Studio Orchestra, which consisted of 16 players and performed light music for radio audiences. it was increased in size by merging with players from the defunct South Australian Orchestra, and renamed the Adelaide Symphony Orchestra. He led the orchestra for the next 12 years, until retiring in 1948. During this time he also conducted other Australian Broadcasting Commission (ABC) orchestras around Australia.

Norman Chinner served as his assistant for many years before their responsibilities were divided, with Chinner taking over as choirmaster. After retirement he was appointed an Honorary Life Member of the Australian Musicians Union.

Cade died in his home town in 1957, aged 74. He and his wife had three daughters.
