= William Bowen Chinner =

(1850–1915) South Australian musician

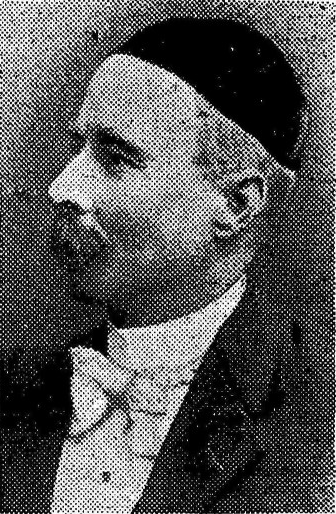
- Chinner, from his obituary in the Observer, 10 July 1915
- Born: 1850; Brighton, South Australia
- Died: 2 July 1915
- Education: St Peter's College, Adelaide
- Occupations: Organist, choirmaster, music teacher, composer
- Years active: 1869–1905
- Employer: Prince Alfred College
- Spouse(s): Emma Morcom Cotton (m. 1875; died 1908); Annie Elizabeth Claridge (m. 1910)
- Parent(s): George Williams Chinner; Caroline Chinner (née Bowen)
- Relatives: John Henry Chinner

William Bowen Chinner (1850 – 2 July 1915) was a South Australian organist, choirmaster, teacher and composer.

== History ==
Chinner was born in Brighton, South Australia, a son of George Williams Chinner ( – 27 May 1880) and his wife Caroline Chinner née Bowen (died 1861). George arrived in South Australia in November 1845 aboard Templar with his parents John and Anne Chinner, née Williams. George was one of the City of Brighton's original councillors, at one time part owner of The Advertiser, a partner in Chinner & Parkin which would become James Marshall & Co. of Rundle Street, and a proficient musician. He was one of the judges appointed by the Gawler Institute to select the music for Caroline Carleton's "Song of Australia".

Chinner was educated at St Peter's College where he had a successful career, winning the Short scholarship (named for Bishop Short), but his great love was for music performance, in which he was capably tutored by his father, who though an amateur was sufficiently respected to be on the panel of judges which in 1859 selected Carl Linger's composition to accompany Caroline Carleton's Song of Australia.

In 1887 Chinner wrote a choral arrangement of the Song of Australia with piano accompaniment, which enjoyed considerable popularity.

In 1869 he was appointed honorary organist and choirmaster to the Pirie Street Wesleyan (Methodist) Church. In November 1872 he left for Melbourne for study purposes, returning in 1873 to the Pirie Street church. He had a flourishing practice as a private tutor and in 1875 succeeded Carl Püttmann as music master at Prince Alfred College. For 30 years he served as choirmaster and organist to the Pirie Street church, which enjoyed a high reputation for its musical offerings. He was a prolific composer of works for choir and organ, many of which were published and acquired currency beyond the State and Commonwealth.

He retired around 1905 and lived a secluded life in his Hutt Street home. He died on 2 July 1915.

== Compositions ==
Among Chinner's many compositions, several have been used regularly in church services:

Anthems

- O Lord my God
- Lord God of Heaven and Earth
- The Golden Land
- Heaven or the Better Land

Cantatas

all with libretti by G. F. Chinner

- The Light of the World
- The Prodigal Son
- Solomon's Lost Song
- The Christian Magna Charta

== Recognition ==
- Sir John Stainer, who had a strong influence on Chinner's music, praised Chinner's compositions.

== Family ==
Chinner married Emma Morcom Cotton (died 1908) in 1875. He married again, to Annie Elizabeth Claridge on 21 April 1910. He had no children.

Chinner had seven brothers:

- George Frederick Chinner (1852 – 18 July 1918), poet who wrote libretti to many of Chinner's compositions.

George Williams Chinner married again in 1863 to Mary Edwards

- John Henry Chinner (30 June 1865 – 15 December 1933) was Mayor of Unley 1909–1912, and a well known caricaturist for Quiz and other newspapers.
- Charles Williams Chinner (18 July 1866 – 21 March 1953) married Winnifred Maud Cowperthwaite on 20 April 1907

- Norman Chinner (7 August 1909 – 5 November 1961) organist and choirmaster, commemorated in a Canberra street name.

- Robert Arthur Chinner (1867–1955) generally known as Arthur Robert Chinner, married Harriet Grace Prior in 1920. Lived in Brighton.
- Walter Edwards Chinner (1869 – 21 January 1949) married Ethel Maude Bowen (died 1912) in 1895. He married again, in 1915, to Laura Edith Dickinson.

- Clem Bowen Chinner ( – 19 March 1952) married (Gladys) Mary Smith (1902– ), daughter of Quinton Stow Smith in 1936.
- Ruth Bowen Chinner (1903–1948) married Victor Tennyson Knox (1901–1963), son of W. R. Knox, on 2 September 1930.

- Hubert George Williams Chinner (1870 – 12 June 1953) married Mary Ellen Grasby on 24 November 1896. He was well known as a State cricketer.
- Amos Francis "Moss" Chinner (1873 – 12 December 1941) was a champion lawn bowls player
