= 1977 Australian referendum (Retirement of judges) =

Australian constitutional referendum on judges' retirement

Australian Judge Retirement Age referendum, 1977
- 21 May 1977
- It is proposed to alter the Constitution so as to provide for retiring ages for judges of federal courts. Do you approve of the proposed law?

Results
Choice	Votes	%
Yes	5,980,394	80.10%
No	1,485,574	19.90%
Valid votes	7,465,968	98.16%
Invalid or blank votes	139,914	1.84%
Total votes	7,605,882	100.00%
Registered voters/turnout	8,242,383	92.28%

The Constitution Alteration (Retirement of Judges) Bill 1977 was a successful proposal to alter the Australian Constitution to introduce a retirement age of 70 for federal judges. It was put to voters for approval in a referendum held on 21 May 1977. After being approved in the referendum, it received the royal assent and became law on 29 July 1977.

As of 2026 it is the most recent referendum in Australia that has led to the successful modification of the Constitution.

== Question ==
It is proposed to alter the Constitution so as to provide for retiring ages for judges of federal courts.

Do you approve the proposed law?

== Changes to the text of the constitution ==
The proposal was to add the following paragraphs at the end of section 72.

The appointment of a Justice of the High Court shall be for a term expiring upon his attaining the age of seventy years, and a person shall not be appointed as a Justice of the High Court if he has attained that age.

The appointment of a Justice of a court created by the Parliament shall be for a term expiring upon his attaining the age that is, at the time of his appointment, the maximum age for Justices of that court and a person shall not be appointed as a Justice of such a court if he has attained the age that is for the time being the maximum age for Justices of that court.

Subject to this section, the maximum age for Justices of any court created by the Parliament is seventy years.

The Parliament may make a law fixing an age that is less than seventy years as the maximum age for Justices of a court created by the Parliament and may at any time repeal or amend such a law, but any such repeal or amendment does not affect the term of office of a Justice under an appointment made before the repeal or amendment.

A Justice of the High Court or of a court created by the Parliament may resign his office by writing under his hand delivered to the Governor-General.

Nothing in the provisions added to this section by the Constitution Alteration (Retirement of Judges) 1977 affects the continuance of a person in office as a Justice of a court under an appointment made before the commencement of those provisions.

A reference in this section to the appointment of a Justice of the High Court or of a court created by the Parliament shall be read as including a reference to the appointment of a person who holds office as a Justice of the High Court or of a court created by the Parliament to another office of Justice of the same court having a different status or designation.

== Results ==
Result (Note: Handbook of the 44th Parliament (2014) "Part 5 - Referendums and Plebiscites - Referendum results". Parliamentary Library of Australia.)
State	Electoral roll	Ballots issued	For		Against		Informal
State	Electoral roll	Ballots issued	Vote	%	Vote	%	Informal
New South Wales	3,007,511	2,774,388	2,316,999	84.84	414,070	15.16	43,319
Victoria	2,252,831	2,083,136	1,659,273	81.43	378,505	18.57	45,358
Queensland	1,241,426	1,138,842	734,183	65.24	391,227	34.76	13,432
South Australia	799,243	745,990	622,760	85.57	104,987	14.43	18,243
Western Australia	682,291	617,463	472,228	78.37	130,307	21.63	14,928
Tasmania	259,081	246,063	174,951	72.46	66,478	27.54	4,634
Total for Commonwealth	8,242,383	7,605,882	5,980,394	80.10	1,485,574	19.90	139,914
Results	Obtained majority in all six States and an overall majority of 4,494,820 votes. Carried						

== Discussion ==
In October 1976 the Senate Standing Committee on Constitutional and Legal Affairs recommended a retiring age for all federal judges. This recommendation was based on

- a perceived need 'to maintain vigorous and dynamic courts'
- a need to open up avenues for 'able legal practitioners' to achieve judicial positions
- a growing community belief in a compulsory retiring age for judges
- avoiding 'the unfortunate necessity' of removing a judge made unfit for office by declining health.

The committee's view was accepted by the Australian Constitutional Convention soon thereafter.

The amendment introduced in the following year sought to provide for a retiring age of 70 for all federal court judges, including those on the High Court. The issue was not controversial, despite Sir Robert Menzies' description of the change as 'superficial and ill-considered'. Over 80 per cent of voters supported the amendment.

The amendment applied prospectively, meaning the tenure of those High Court and Federal judges appointed prior to the referendum were unaffected. Of the serving High Court judges, only Sir Garfield Barwick made use of his original tenure, retiring in 1981 at the age of 77. The remaining judges either retired, resigned, or died, with the exception of Sir Harry Gibbs and Sir Anthony Mason, who were appointed Chief Justice and thus lost their right to the original life tenure. Several Federal judges made use of their original tenure, with judges of the Australian Industrial Court Sir Percy Joske retiring on 31 December 1977 aged 82, and Edward Dunphy retiring on 31 December 1982 aged 75. Five Federal Court judges did not retire at age 70, Sir Nigel Bowen (1990), aged 79, Sir John Nimmo (1980) aged 71, Sir Reginald Smithers (1986) aged 83, Charles Sweeney (1995) aged 80 and Ray Northrop (1998) aged 73.

Amendments to the Constitution of Australia
5th amendment Aboriginals Amendment (1910)	Senate Vacancies Amendment; Referendum amendment Retirement of Judges amendment 1977	Most recent amendments
