= Jacob Pitman =

Australian architect (1810–1890)

Jacob Pitman (28 November 1810 – 12 March 1890) was an architect, builder and educator in the colonies of South Australia and New South Wales. He was a brother of Isaac Pitman and was associated with his development of shorthand transcription.

== History ==
Pitman was born in Trowbridge, Wiltshire, the eldest son of Samuel Pitman and his wife Maria, née Davis. He was apprenticed to a local builder then worked for a building firm in London. They emigrated to South Australia with daughters, Melissa and Sarah in the Trusty, arriving 15 May 1838. During the journey he made friends with William Holden, who was to have a journalistic career in Adelaide.

He set up as a builder and an architect at 84, then 90, Rundle Street east. He invested heavily in land, including in 1839, an 80 acres (32 ha) section (Section 824), one allotment of which, near the present corner of Grand Junction and Valley Roads, he sold to Holden, who used it to set up a butcher's shop and general store. It was Holden who dubbed the area Hope Valley. Pitman was declared insolvent in 1843 during a depression, and forced to unload these assets, but by the 1850s he was back in work, bridge-building on the River Torrens and near Echunga.

He founded a branch of the Swedenborgian Church in Adelaide and served as its minister from 1844 to 1859. From 1846, he also taught shorthand following his brother's system. He left for Melbourne in 1870, although he returned to Adelaide on occasion: his design for the Institute and Museum building on North Terrace won second prize in 1874. His wife died in Adelaide in 1881, prompting his return.

He moved to Camperdown, New South Wales, where he taught Pitman shorthand, for a time associated with the Sydney Technical College. He continued his association with Swedenborgianism; he married again and died in 1890 and was buried in Rookwood Cemetery, where his epitaph is uniquely written phonetically, using the Pitman scheme of reformed spelling.

== Family ==
He married Emma Hooper (c. 1809 – 4 June 1881) in England on 31 December 1833. He married again on 1 January 1883, to the widow Catherine Mary Hayden, née Yates. His children included:

- fourth daughter Rosella Pitman (c. 1840 – 17 June 1859) died at Unley
- Frederick Pitman (c. 1842 – 5 August 1898)
- second son Alfred Frank Pitman (c. 1845 – 7 December 1873)
- Harriet Lily Pitman (3 August 1846 – 18 July 1939) married George J. Ireland on 26 March 1889
- Clarence Pitman (c. 1848 – 9 March 1926) married Caroline Anna Blood Newenham on 30 Oct 1871. Buried at Marysville Cemetery, Victoria, Australia

Jacob's uncle William Pitman (c. 1801 – 22 June 1859) and his wife Emma, née Angel, (1798 – 21 January 1866) of Trowbridge, Wiltshire emigrated to South Australia on the Fairlie, arriving on 4 April 1840, with their eight children, including:

- second daughter Ann Pitman (9 June 1826 – 14 August 1917) married John Harvey, a South Australian farmer and parliamentarian.
- fourth son Thomas Pitman (16 May 1834 – 17 January 1925) was a successful builder, living at 112 Osmond Terrace, Norwood. Partnership with John Crocker erecting buildings for the Overland Telegraph station, the British and Australian Cable Company and the South Australian Government 1872–1874; then Customs house at Port Augusta, Government offices in King William Street. The partnership was dissolved in January 1875, Crocker taking over the business.

He married Mary Day on 27 February 1855; their children included Talbot Goss Pitman and Randolph Pitman of Leabrook, Sydney Herbert Pitman, of Rose Park, Lily Angel Pitman (married James Lake Bowell) and Mary Pitman (married William E. Wyatt), of Glenelg, and Florence Ina Pitman (married Walter Henry Newman), of Hoyleton.
