= 1977 Australian referendum (Referendums) =

1977 Australian Territorial Suffrage referendum
21 May 1977
- It is proposed to alter the Constitution so as to allow electors in the territories, as well as electors in the states, to vote at referendums on laws proposed to alter the Constitution. Do you approve of the proposed law?
- Outcome: Amendment Passed

Results
Choice	Votes	%
Yes	5,805,669	77.72%
No	1,664,156	22.28%
Valid votes	7,469,825	98.21%
Invalid or blank votes	136,057	1.79%
Total votes	7,605,882	100.00%
Registered voters/turnout	8,242,383	92.28%

The 1977 Referendums question was a successful amendment to the Australian constitution that allowed Australians living in territories to vote on future referendums. This question was put to voters alongside four others during 1977. With the success of the vote, the Constitution Alteration (Referendums) Bill 1977 passed. In future referendums, the votes of electors in the territories would be counted towards the national total, but would not be counted towards any state total.

== Question ==
It is proposed to alter the Constitution so as to allow electors in the territories, as well as electors in the states, to vote at referendums on proposed laws to alter the Constitution.

Do you approve the proposed law?

== Changes to the text of the constitution ==
The following changes were made to the constitution following the result of the referendum (removed text stricken through; substituted text in bold):

Section 128

The proposed law for the alteration thereof must be passed by an absolute majority of each House of the Parliament, and not less than two nor more than six months after its passage through both Houses the proposed law shall be submitted in each State and Territory to the electors qualified to vote for the election of members of the House of Representatives.

But if either House passes any such proposed law by an absolute majority, and the other House rejects or fails to pass it, or passes it with any amendment to which the first-mentioned House will not agree, and if after an interval of three months the first-mentioned House in the same or the next session again passes the proposed law by an absolute majority with or without any amendment which has been made or agreed to by the other House, and such other House rejects or fails to pass it or passes it with any amendment to which the first-mentioned House will not agree, the Governor-General may submit the proposed law as last proposed by the first-mentioned House, and either with or without any amendments subsequently agreed to by both Houses, to the electors in each State and Territory qualified to vote for the election of the House of Representatives.

When a proposed law is submitted to the electors the vote shall be taken in such manner as the Parliament prescribes. But until the qualification of electors of members of the House of Representatives becomes uniform throughout the Commonwealth, only one-half the electors voting for and against the proposed law shall be counted in any State in which adult suffrage prevails.

And if in a majority of the States a majority of the electors voting approve the proposed law, and if a majority of all the electors voting also approve the proposed law, it shall be presented to the Governor-General for the Queen's assent.

No alteration diminishing the proportionate representation of any State in either House of the Parliament, or the minimum number of representatives of a State in the House of Representatives, or increasing, diminishing, or otherwise altering the limits of the State, or in any manner affecting the provisions of the Constitution in relation thereto, shall become law unless the majority of the electors voting in that State approve the proposed law.

In this section, "Territory" means any territory referred to in section one hundred and twenty-two of this Constitution in respect of which there is in force a law allowing its representation in the House of Representatives.

== Results ==
Result (Note: Handbook of the 44th Parliament (2014) "Part 5 - Referendums and Plebiscites - Referendum results". Parliamentary Library of Australia.)
State	Electoral roll	Ballots issued	For		Against		Informal
State	Electoral roll	Ballots issued	Vote	%	Vote	%	Informal
New South Wales	3,007,511	2,774,388	2,292,822	83.92	439,247	16.08	42,319
Victoria	2,252,831	2,083,136	1,647,187	80.78	391,855	19.22	44,094
Queensland	1,241,426	1,138,842	670,820	59.58	455,051	40.42	12,971
South Australia	799,243	745,990	606,743	83.29	121,770	16.71	17,477
Western Australia	682,291	617,463	437,751	72.62	165,049	27.38	14,663
Tasmania	259,081	246,063	150,346	62.25	91,184	37.75	4,533
Total for Commonwealth	8,242,383	7,605,882	5,805,669	77.72	1,664,156	22.28	136,057
Results	Obtained majority in all six States and an overall majority of 4,141,513 votes. Carried						

== Discussion ==
At the time of Federation, the very few people who lived in the Northern Territory voted as residents of South Australia. Territorians could therefore vote in constitutional referendums. When the Territory was surrendered to the Commonwealth in 1911, however, its citizens lost the vote in such referendums, due to the absence of reference to Territory voters in s. 128. Residents of the Australian Capital Territory were similarly restricted. In 1967 demonstrations against this restriction occurred in Alice Springs, as Territorians expressed their resentment at not being able to vote in the Aboriginals referendum.

In the 1974 referendum the Whitlam Government attempted to amend s. 128 in a double-pronged proposal. Territorial voting rights in referendums were sought, but the Government also proposed that constitutional amendments could be carried with just half of the states — instead of a majority of states — voting in favour. Only New South Wales supported the proposal, but it is likely that, had the Territories section been a separate question, it would have been ratified.

In 1977 the question of Territory votes was relatively uncontroversial, being carried in every state, gaining a national "yes" vote of 77.7 per cent, though Queensland (40.4 percent) and Tasmania (37.8 percent) had quite large "no" votes. It has been claimed that the high vote of approval was a reminder of Australia's honourable record of electoral reform — that the amendment had "Australian political tradition behind it". Despite John Paul of the University of New South Wales dismissing the change as the granting of a "hollow privilege", The Canberra Times stated that people in both Territories should be grateful, "for the universal acknowledgment that their natural right to vote in future referendums will now be given the force of law".

Amendments to the Constitution of Australia
5th amendment Aboriginals Amendment (1910)	Senate Vacancies Amendment; Referendum amendment Retirement of Judges amendment 1977	Most recent amendments
