= Torrens Valley Christian School =

Coordinates: 34°50′33″S 138°42′03″E

- 1227 Grand Jct Rd, Hope Valley SA 5090; Adelaide; Australia

Information
- Motto: In Christ, Wisdom and Knowledge
- Denomination: Multi-denominational
- Established: 1980
- Principal: Emily Brookes
- Years offered: Reception to Year 12
- Gender: Co-Ed
- Enrolment: 600
- Colours: Navy, Red and White
- Website: www.tvcs.sa.edu.au

Torrens Valley Christian School is a multi-denominational, co-educational Adelaide Christian school in the North-East providing a distinctive Christian environment to approximately 600 Reception to Year 12 students. The school is situated in Hope Valley, South Australia. The school is recognised as Christ-centred education, teaching through a biblical worldview that helps form students into responsible, Christ-like learners.

The school runs distinct Primary, Middle, and Senior Schools.

== History ==
The Torrens Valley Association for Christian Parent Controlled Education Inc. was formed on 16 March 1978 by members of the Reformed Church of Adelaide. Under the leadership of Rev. Bill Deenick, the first Board set a target to open Torrens Valley Christian School in Term 1, 1980.

The school opened on schedule with 14 students and teacher Jenny Sexton, initially operating from the Reformed Church of Adelaide facilities. By 1982, enrollment had grown to 42 students, prompting the Board to purchase a five-acre block in Hope Valley. Peter van der Schoor was appointed as the first principal in 1983.

The school relocated to its permanent Hope Valley site in 1984 and adopted the motto "In Christ - Wisdom and Knowledge" (Colossians 2:3). Secondary education began with Year 8 in 1985, expanding to include Years 11 and 12 by 1988–1989. The first Year 12 class graduated in 1989.

Major infrastructure developments included government building grants in the 1990s for a resource centre and administration area, extensive facility upgrades in 2008-2010 through the Building Education Revolution initiative, and the completion of a new $12 million Primary School building in 2023. The school celebrated its 25th anniversary in 2005 and continues to expand with ongoing facility improvements and property acquisitions.

=== Principals ===
Dates	Principal
2026-present	Anton Visser
2023–2025	Emily Brookes
2013–2022	Julie Prattis
2004–2012	Nigel Bennett
1996–2003	Andrew Mackenzie
1988–1996	Bob Stunell
1983–1987	Peter van der Schoor

== Facilities ==
Torrens Valley Christian School operates from a modern campus in Hope Valley designed to support academic, social, and spiritual development.

Academic Buildings

The school features a new Primary School Building completed in 2023, designed with modern, flexible learning spaces including purpose-built classrooms, breakout areas, and outdoor learning zones. The facility houses specialized environments for Science and Art, additional Middle School classrooms, and refurbished Home Economics facilities. The campus includes a comprehensive library with individual learning areas, a senior study room, multi-use breakout spaces, and a dedicated Primary library section.

Sports and Recreation

Athletic facilities include two multi-purpose playing courts for tennis, netball, and basketball, as well as a full-sized indoor basketball court housed within the school hall. The gymnasium has been recently improved along with specialist Physical Education facilities. Recreational areas feature a Climb and Swing Playground with climbing structures and interactive elements, and a newly completed Nature Play area designed to encourage outdoor exploration and creativity.

Specialised Facilities

The school maintains dedicated spaces including Music rooms, specialist facilities for Physics and Mathematics, and a wellbeing space providing support services for student emotional and social development. The hall serves multiple functions, hosting assemblies, PE activities, and sports during summer months.

== Academic Performance ==
Torrens Valley Christian School demonstrates strong performance in the National Assessment Program – Literacy and Numeracy (NAPLAN). The school regularly achieves results that were generally above national averages across most year levels and subject areas.

The school employs 52 teaching staff and 40 non-teaching staff.

Torrens Valley Christian School has maintained consistently strong performance in the South Australian Certificate of Education (SACE) over recent years, achieving 100% SACE completion rates from 2019 to 2024.

The school's academic achievements include notable individual performances, with School Dux results of 99.05 in both 2023 and 2024, 98.95 in 2022, and 97.40 in 2019. High-achieving students regularly earn A+ grades with Merit recognition, with recent years showing between 3-19 A+ results annually.

ATAR performance demonstrates strong academic outcomes across the cohort. In 2022, 23% of students achieved ATARs above 90, while 40% scored above 80. The 2024 cohort saw 16% of students achieve ATARs over 90 and 57% over 80. Grade distribution consistently shows strong results, with A and A+ grades typically comprising 44-48% of all grades, and B-grade or higher results ranging from 77 to 90% across recent years.

The school offers comprehensive Vocational Education and Training (VET) pathways, with students completing between 20 and 21 Certificate II and III qualifications annually in recent years. The school maintains 100% completion rates for both the Australian Intermediate Fellowship (AIF) program and Research Project requirements. Vocational education programmes include qualifications across multiple sectors: Information Technology (1 total enrolment), Engineering and Related Technologies (2 enrolments), Architecture and Building (4 enrolments), Society and Culture (12 enrolments), and Creative Arts (5 enrolments), with data current to 2014–2022.

== Christian Education ==
As a member of Christian Education National (CEN), the school emphasises strong partnerships between home, church and school while actively promoting a biblically authentic approach to education that endorses a transformational Christian worldview permeating all aspects of learning and community life.

The school maintains "unwavering Christian beliefs and education" while fostering individual development, with staff demonstrating "a deep sense of love and care for each of our children, encouraging them to do their best while taking into consideration their individual needs, talents and interests." Torrens Valley Christian School operates as a Christ-centred learning environment developing young people to believe, belong and become all that God has created them to be, integrating biblical principles across curriculum delivery while equipping students with both academic knowledge and Christian character formation.

== Notable alumni ==
- Matthew Glaetzer: Australian Olympic track cyclist
- Daniel Gorringe: AFL footballer Gold Coast Suns 2011–2015, Carlton Blues 2016–2017, social media personality and content creator.
- Emily Hodgson: Adelaide United Westfield W-League 2016–2018 squad, Young Matildas Squad 2018

== Sources ==
- Official website
- Brian Vaatstra, A Short History of TVCS 1975-1983, 1 April 1984
- https://web.archive.org/web/20080718214920/http://tvcs.sa.edu.au/school.htm
