= Peter Dodds McCormick =

Australian schoolteacher and songwriter (1833–1916)

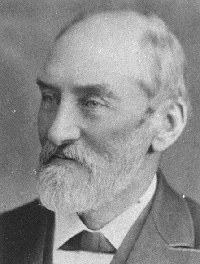
- Peter Dodds McCormick
- Born: 28 January 1833; Port Glasgow, Scotland, United Kingdom
- Died: 30 October 1916 (aged 83); Sydney, New South Wales, Australia
- Other name: Amicus (Latin for Friend)
- Occupations: Composer, teacher
- Years active: 1855–1913
- Known for: Composing Advance Australia Fair

Peter Dodds McCormick (28 January 1833 – 30 October 1916) was an Australian schoolteacher and songwriter, known for composing the Australian national anthem, "Advance Australia Fair". He published under the pseudonym Amicus, Latin for "friend".

== Early life ==
Peter Dodds McCormick was born to Peter McCormick and Janet (née Dodds) at Port Glasgow, Scotland in 1833.

== Biography ==
Peter completed an apprenticeship as a joiner in Scotland before emigrating to Sydney (at that time the principal city of the British colony of New South Wales) on 21 February 1855. He initially worked as a joiner for "some years".

McCormick spent most of his work life employed by the NSW Education Department. In 1863 he was appointed teacher-in charge at St Mary's National School. McCormick married Emily Boucher, a sewing teacher, on 16 July 1863, who died on 11 March 1866, aged 22. He remarried, to Emma Elizabeth Dening, on 22 December 1866. He also taught at the Presbyterian Denominational school in the Sydney suburb of Woolloomooloo in 1867. McCormick then moved to Dowling Plunkett Street Public School in 1878 where he remained until 1885.

McCormick was heavily involved in the Scottish Presbyterian Church and was active in a number of community and benevolent organisations. He began his involvement with Sydney's St Stephen's Church as a stonemason, working on the now demolished Phillip Street Church (where Martin Place now stands). The Rev Hugh Darling was so impressed with his singing on the job he asked him to join the choir. McCormick's musical ability led him to becoming the precentor of the Presbyterian Church of NSW, which gave him the opportunity to conduct very large massed choirs. He was also convenor of the Presbyterian Church Assembly's Committee on Psalmody.

Also a talented composer, he published around 30 patriotic and Scottish songs, some of which became very popular. Included in his collected works was "Advance Australia Fair", which was first performed in public by Andrew Fairfax at the St Andrew's Day concert of the Highland Society on 30 November 1878.

"Advance Australia Fair" became quite a popular patriotic song. The Sydney Morning Herald described the music as bold and stirring, and the words "decidedly patriotic" – it was "likely to become a popular favourite". Later under the pseudonym Amicus (which means 'friend' in Latin), he had the music and four verses published by W. H. Paling & Co. Ltd. The song quickly gained popularity and an amended version was sung by a choir of 10,000 at the inauguration of the Commonwealth of Australia on 1 January 1901. In 1907, the New South Wales Government awarded McCormick £100 for his patriotic composition which he registered for copyright in 1915.

In a letter to R. B. Fuller Esq., dated 1 August 1913, McCormick described the circumstances that inspired him to pen the lyrics of his famous song:

One night I attended a great concert in the Exhibition Building, when all the National Anthems of the world were to be sung by a large choir with band accompaniment. This was very nicely done, but I felt very aggravated that there was not one note for Australia. On the way home in a bus, I concocted the first verse of my song & when I got home I set it to music. I first wrote it in the Tonic Sol-fa notation, then transcribed it into the Old Notation, & I tried it over on an instrument next morning, & found it correct. Strange to say there has not been a note of it altered since. Some alteration has been made in the wording, but the sense is the same. It seemed to me to be like an inspiration, & I wrote the words & music with the greatest ease.

== Death ==
McCormick died in 1916, aged 83, at his home, Clydebank, in the Sydney suburb of Waverley and he was buried at Rookwood Cemetery. He had no children; he was survived by his second wife Emma. His obituary in the Sydney Morning Herald stated: "Mr. McCormick established a reputation with the patriotic song, Advance Australia Fair, which ... has come to be recognised as something in the nature of an Australian National Anthem".

The song was performed by massed bands at the Federal capital celebrations in Canberra in 1927. In 1984 it was formally declared as the Australian national anthem, replacing God Save the Queen.
