= Daniel Gorringe =

Australian rules footballer (born 1992)

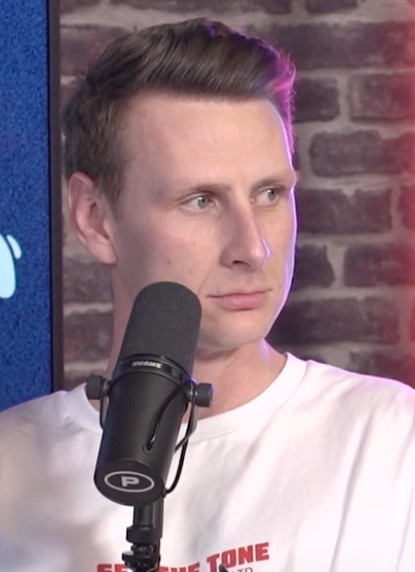
- Gorringe in September 2022

Personal information
- Born: 2 June 1992 (age 34); Adelaide, South Australia
- Original team: Norwood (SANFL)
- Draft: No. 10, 2010 national draft
- Height: 200 cm (6 ft 7 in)
- Weight: 97 kg (214 lb)

Playing career
Years	Club	Games (Goals)
2011–2015	Gold Coast	22 (7)
2016–2017	Carlton	4 (4)
Total		26 (11)

Daniel Gorringe (born 2 June 1992) is a former Australian rules footballer who played for Gold Coast and Carlton. After being drafted from the Norwood Football Club, he made his Australian Football League (AFL) debut for Gold Coast in 2011 and played 22 games in his five seasons with the Suns, before being delisted and subsequently signed by Carlton, where he played four games in 2016.

== Early life ==
Gorringe was born and raised in Adelaide, South Australia, where he attended Torrens Valley Christian School throughout his upbringing. He began playing Australian rules football for the Tea Tree Gully Football Club at the age of 13 and later switched to the Norwood Football Club to play top level SANFL football. He played for Norwood's senior side for most of his 2010 season and averaged 21 hit-outs per game for the South Australian state team in the 2010 AFL Under 18 Championships. As a result, he was named as the starting ruckman in the 2010 Under-18 All-Australian team. He was also invited to participate in the 2010 AFL draft combine where he ranked first in physical testing amongst other ruck draft prospects in his age group. A month later, Gold Coast drafted Gorringe with pick 10 in the 2010 national draft.

== AFL career ==
=== Gold Coast (2011–2015) ===
Gorringe made his AFL debut against the Western Bulldogs at Etihad Stadium in round 3, 2011 where he managed a goal and took a spectacular mark. Two weeks later he played in Gold Coast's historic first ever AFL win by three points against Port Adelaide at AAMI Stadium. He faced numerous injuries to his ankle and hamstring in 2011 and only managed to play seven games in his first AFL season. His injury problems continued in 2012 when he injured his achilles, which took him out for almost the whole season. In 2013 he managed to play nine AFL games for Gold Coast as a useful ruckman and key forward which earned him a two-year contract extension to the end of 2015.

In 2014 Gorringe suffered another achilles injury which kept him on the sidelines for most of the season. Late in 2014 he recovered to play three AFL games, but a knee injury ended his season prematurely. At the conclusion of the 2014 season Gorringe attempted to secure a trade to Port Adelaide, but when Essendon ruckman Patrick Ryder became available to Port Adelaide he was left to finish out his contract at Gold Coast. Gorringe later revealed his decision to give everyone at the Suns "an absolute serve on the way out" when it appeared he had secured a trade to Port Adelaide and had to apologise to the staff at the club when the trade fell through and he returned for their 2015 season. Injuries continued to wreak havoc on his career in 2015 and poor form meant he was only able to play two AFL games. Towards the end of the season his form for Gold Coast's reserves team started to improve and he explored his options to move to another club. He was delisted by the Gold Coast in October 2015 and in November, he was recruited by Carlton as a delisted free agent.

=== Carlton (2016–2017) ===
Gorringe played for the Northern Blues in the Victorian Football League between rounds 1 to 8 of the 2016 season, before injuries to Matthew Kreuzer and Andrew Phillips opened up an opportunity in the senior Carlton side. He played his first game for Carlton against North Melbourne, matching up against one of the AFL's best ruckmen in Todd Goldstein. He was dominated by Goldstein throughout the match with the hitout discrepancy totalling 38 and Carlton losing the affair by 67 points. He played three more AFL games before a hip injury ended his season. He faced yet another setback in the 2017 pre-season when he re-injured his achilles. At the conclusion of the 2017 season, Gorringe decided to retire from football, having played just 26 games across seven seasons as an AFL player.

== Statistics ==
Statistics are correct to the end of the 2017 season

Legend
G	Goals	K	Kicks	D	Disposals	T	Tackles
B	Behinds	H	Handballs	M	Marks	H/O	Hit-outs

Season	Team	No.	Games	Totals								Averages (per game)							
Season	Team	No.	Games	G	B	K	H	D	M	T	H/O	G	B	K	H	D	M	T	H/O
2011	Gold Coast	47	7	2	1	25	34	59	9	6	26	0.3	0.1	3.6	4.9	8.4	1.3	0.9	3.7
2012	Gold Coast	47	1	0	0	1	7	8	2	3	1	0.0	0.0	1.0	7.0	8.0	2.0	3.0	1.0
2013	Gold Coast	15	9	3	0	46	60	106	24	13	102	0.3	0.0	5.1	6.7	11.8	2.7	1.4	11.3
2014	Gold Coast	15	3	1	1	18	16	34	4	5	54	0.3	0.3	6.0	5.3	11.3	1.3	1.7	18.0
2015	Gold Coast	15	2	1	0	6	11	17	3	7	6	0.5	0.0	3.0	5.5	8.5	1.5	3.5	3.0
2016	Carlton	37	4	4	3	27	25	52	17	8	36	1.0	0.8	6.8	6.3	13.0	4.3	2.0	9.0
2017	Carlton	37	0	—	—	—	—	—	—	—	—	—	—	—	—	—	—	—	—
Career			26	11	5	123	153	276	59	42	225	0.4	0.2	4.7	5.9	10.6	2.3	1.6	8.7

== Post-AFL career ==
Gorringe struggled with his mental health following the end of his AFL career, detailing in 2024 that at the time, he was on the brink of suicide.

Gorringe appeared in Channel 7's Big Brother Australia 12 in 2020. He finished the show in second place. He built a large social media following as a result of being on the show.

=== DanDoesFooty ===
Since April 2024, Gorringe has run his own podcast, with DanDoesFooty appearing at #54 on the list of Australian-only podcasts and #71 overall. In September 2025, Gorringe, via his DanDoesFooty handle, was considered one of the biggest sports creators in the country.

== Personal life ==
Gorringe married Ana Cannon on 22 December 2023.
