= Hope Valley, South Australia =

Hope Valley
- Suburb
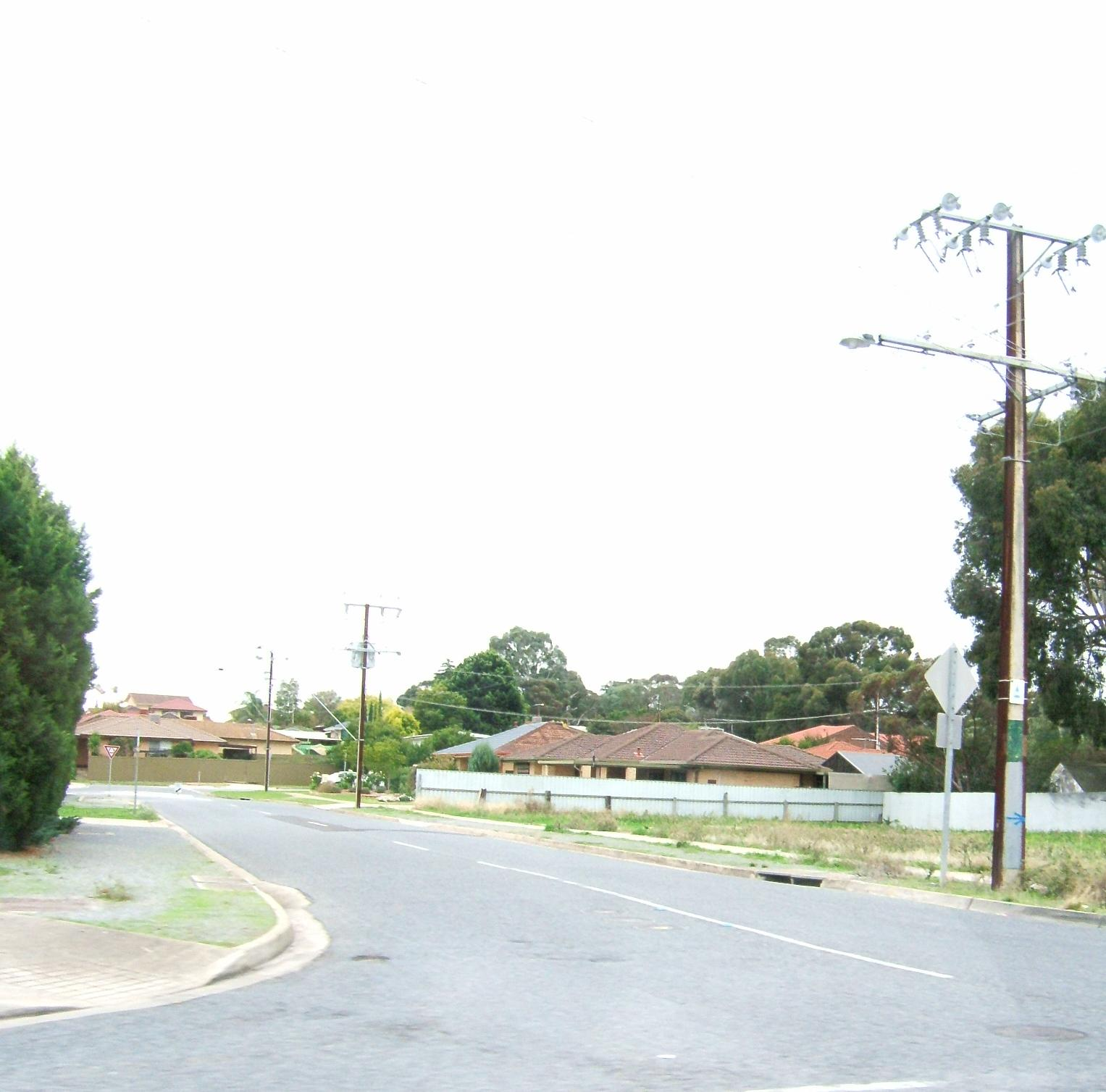

- Country: Australia
- State: South Australia
- City: Adelaide
- LGA: City of Tea Tree Gully
- Established: 1839

Government
  - State electorate: Newland
  - Federal division: Sturt; Makin

Population
  - Total: 8,184 (SAL 2021)
- Postcode: 5090
Suburbs around Hope Valley
Modbury	St Agnes	Vista
Holden Hill	Hope Valley	Vista
Dernancourt	Highbury	Highbury

Hope Valley is a suburb of Adelaide in the City of Tea Tree Gully.

== History ==
Hope Valley was more the result of random settlement than of actual town planning. Jacob Pitman first purchased an 80-acre (320,000 m^{2}) section (Section 824) in 1839. In the early 1840s he sold a few allotments. One such allotment was purchased in 1841 by his friend William Holden who set up a butcher's shop and general store. The site of this store was near the present corner of Grand Junction and Valley Roads. Holden is credited with naming the area "Hope Valley" after returning home in 1842 to find that his house and business had burnt down in a bushfire, but rather than becoming despondent, he felt optimistic. Holden left the area in 1851 to pursue a career in journalism.

Hope Valley was mainly settled by German emigrants escaping religious persecution. Holden spoke German and often acted as interpreter. This is seen as a reason many Germans moved to Hope Valley from Klemzig approximately six kilometres away. In 1847 Hermann Friedrich Koch purchased 8 acres (32,000 m^{2}) of Section 824 and applied for a licence to open a public house – the Bremen Arms. The Bremen Arms was the venue for much of the settlement's meetings in those early days, but since 1905 has been known simply as The Bremen. The original rough stone building has since been encapsulated by a 1970s plain brick structure, which has been expanded on many occasions. Recent renovations have uncovered a curious art deco style corner complete with a sea green round window. This has since been recovered, and the original stonework arches have been exposed and re-pointed in 2010.

In 1849 William Holden formed a committee to establish a school in the area. One acre of land on Grand Junction Road, west of the Bremen Arms, was purchased. The land was then divided into three sections for a schoolhouse, cemetery, and playground. Also in that year Hope Valley became part of the postal route from Adelaide to Mount Torrens and Holden assumed the role of Postmaster.

In 1872 the earthworks that formed the Hope Valley Reservoir began, one of Adelaide's larger bodies of water.

== Present day ==
Hope Valley has since been assimilated as a suburb of the City of Tea Tree Gully and Greater Metropolitan Adelaide. The entire area is now residential, focused around the Hope Valley Shopping Centre. The Valley Inn (formerly The Bremen Hotel)'s current incarnation stands on the same block. The institute still stands mostly as it was first built in 1921 and the old section of the cemetery still contains gravestones of some of the original settlers.

The Catholic Church in the suburb is dedicated to Saint John XXIII. Just up the road from the Valley Inn, on the northern side of Grand Junction Road, is Torrens Valley Christian School, a local private non-denominational Christian school.
