= Carl Linger =

German-Australian composer (1810–1862)

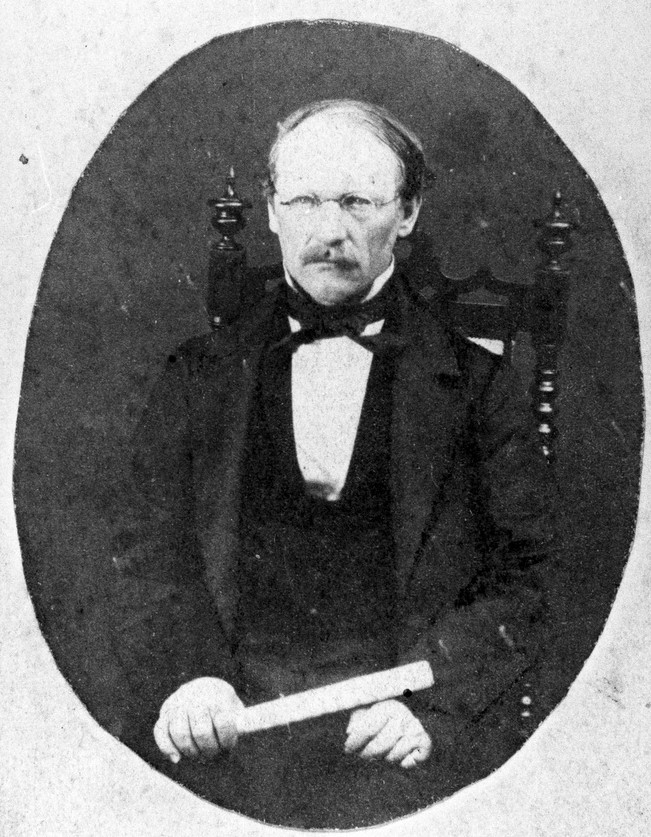

Personal details
- Born: Carl Linger; 15 March 1810 Berlin, Kingdom of Prussia
- Died: 16 February 1862 (aged 51) Adelaide, South Australia
- Spouse: Mathilde Hogrefe
- Profession: Poet, composer

Carl Linger (15 March 1810 – 16 February 1862) was a German Australian composer in South Australia who in 1859 wrote the melody for the patriotic "Song of Australia".

German-born intellectual Carl Linger, who had studied at the Institute of Music in Berlin, came to South Australia in August 1849 aboard Princess Louise. (Note: Also on that ship were Otto Alfred Carl Schomburgk (c. 1809 – 16 August 1857) with wife Maria Charlotte Schomburgk (née Von Selchow), his brother Moritz Richard Schomburgk and his wife Pauline Henriette Schomburgk (née Kneib), who were married at sea, and Carl Wilhelm Ludwig Muecke (16 July 1815 – 4 January 1898) who later married Caroline Schomburgk (died 15 November 1874).) He settled in Gawler, grew potatoes, went broke and settled in Adelaide, where he was far more successful as a musician. He was the founder and conductor of the Adelaide Liedertafel in 1858 and composer of church music, including the "Ninety-third Psalm", "Gloria", "O Lord who is as Thee" and "Vater unser". For several years he played the harmonium at St Frances Xavier Cathedral. Performances were given at his funeral by the Adelaide Liedertafel and Brunswick Band, of which he was also a founder and conductor. His remains were buried at the West Terrace Cemetery. Later, as part of the State's Centenary, a monument was built on his grave. Much of Carl Linger's music has not survived, including orchestral works that were extant in Adelaide in the 1930s. However some sacred works, the orchestral motet "O Lord who is as Thee", The Lords Prayer for choir and organ (Vater Unser), and Four Motets in German have been edited by Richard Divall and are to be found on the Music Archive Monash University site, together with his Sechs Zwischenspiele for Orchestra. His surviving eleven songs in both German and English will also be included on the Monash site in the near future.

== Song of Australia ==
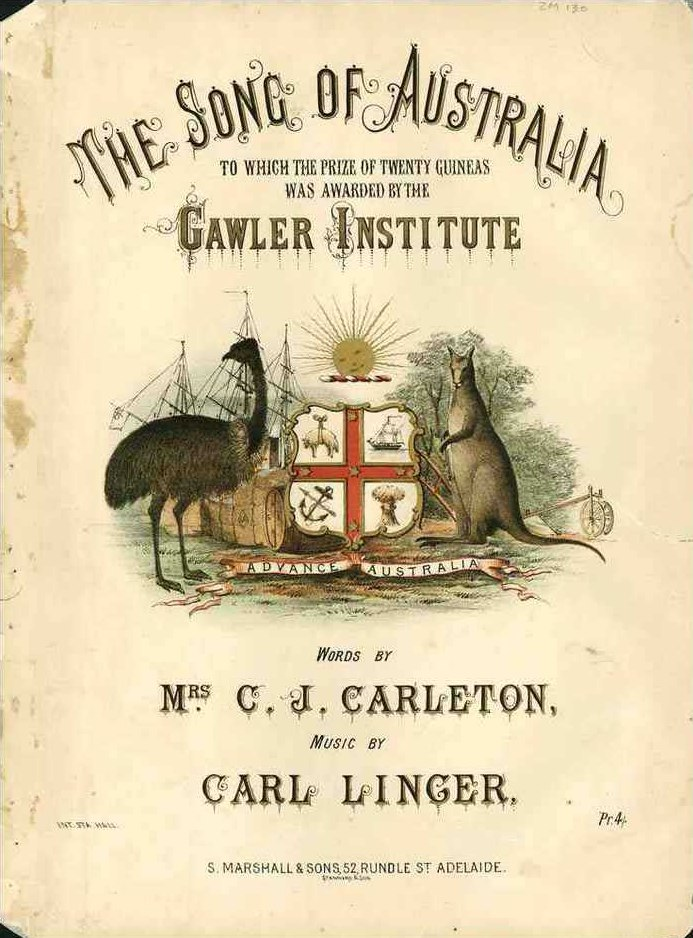
Cover of the original sheet music for the Song of Australia, composed by Linger.

The Song of Australia composed by Linger

Caroline Carleton's "Song of Australia" poem won the contest conducted by the Gawler Institute with a prize of ten guineas, and was published in the South Australian Register. The second phase was a contest to compose the melody for the song, and lodge it with the judges within little more than a week. It was stipulated that entrants were not to identify themselves. Of the twenty-three entries, Herr Linger's tune (submitted under the pseudonym "One of the Quantity") was announced as the winner on 4 November 1859, the prize again being ten guineas (thousands of dollars in today's values). The song was used in South Australian schools and elsewhere, and a popular gramophone recording was made by Peter Dawson in 1933. Sir Bernard Heinze is reported as much preferring Linger's composition to "Advance Australia Fair", which has been criticised as derivative of the German folk song "The Polish Inn". In 1887 W. B. Chinner (son of one of the judges) wrote a choral arrangement of the Song with piano accompaniment, which became popular. The "Song of Australia" was one of four candidates for a National Song put to a plebiscite in 1977 and was the least favourite in every State except South Australia.
