= Advance Australia Fair =

National anthem of Australia

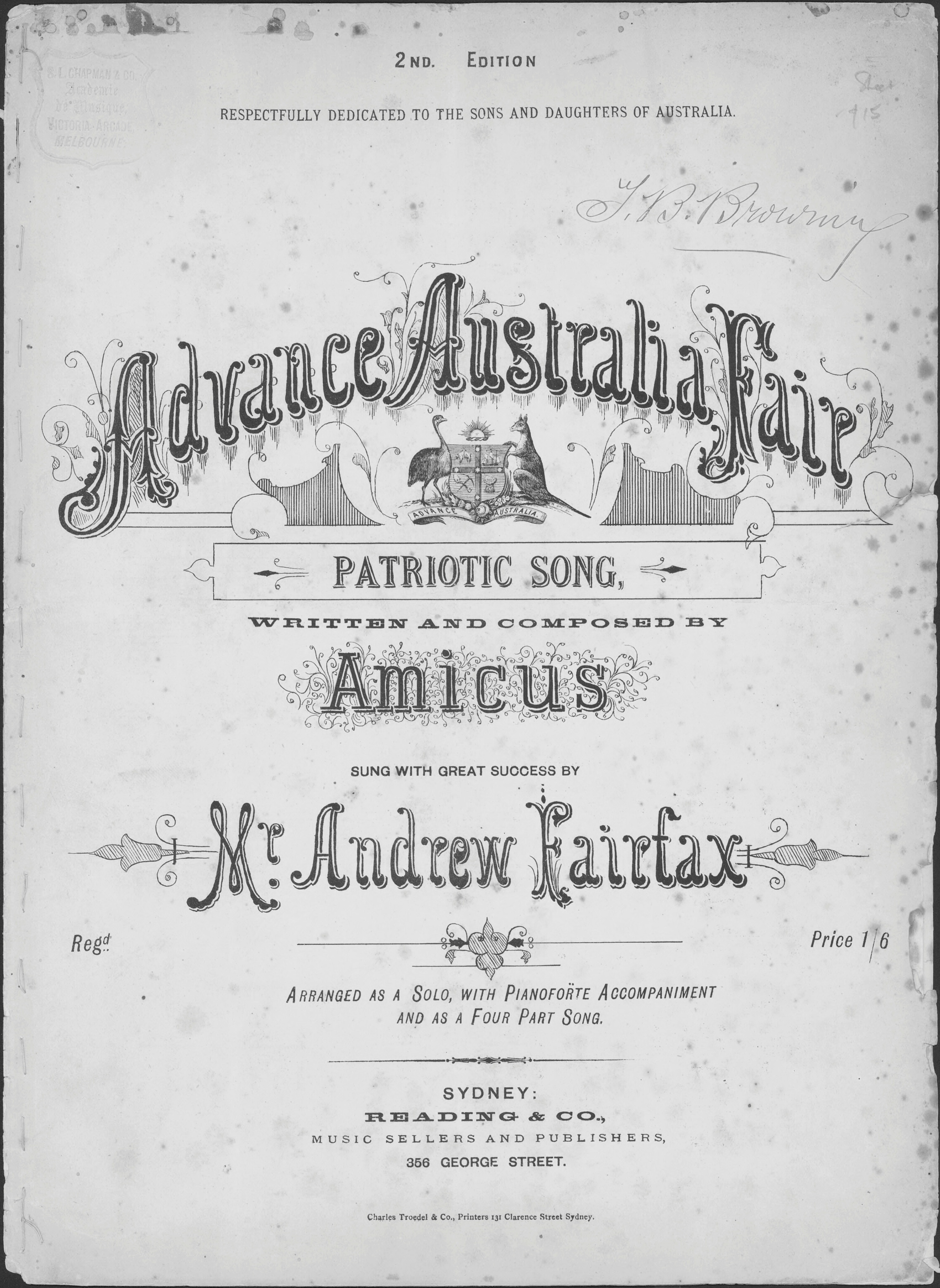
- National anthem of Australia
- Lyrics: Peter Dodds McCormick (as modified by the Australia Day Council), November 1878 (modified 19 April 1984 and 1 January 2021)
- Music: Peter Dodds McCormick, November 1878 (arranged by Thomas Tycho, 1986)
- Adopted: 9 April 1974; (as the national anthem); 22 January 1976; (as one of three "national songs"); 19 April 1984; (readopted as the national anthem)
- Preceded by: "God Save the Queen" (1901–74, 1976–84); "Waltzing Matilda" (1976–84); "Song of Australia" (1976–84)

Audio sample
- US Navy Band instrumental version (one verse) in B-flat major: file; help

"Advance Australia Fair" is the national anthem of Australia. Written by Scottish-born Australian composer Peter Dodds McCormick, the song was first performed as a patriotic song in Australia in 1878. It replaced "God Save the Queen" as the official national anthem by the Whitlam government in 1974, following an indicative opinion survey. The subsequent Fraser government reinstated "God Save the Queen" as the national anthem in January 1976 alongside three other "national songs": "Advance Australia Fair", "Waltzing Matilda" and "Song of Australia". Later in 1977 a plebiscite to choose the "national song" preferred "Advance Australia Fair". This was subsequently proclaimed the national anthem in 1984 by the Hawke government. "God Save the Queen" became the royal anthem (later "God Save the King" on the accession of King Charles III), and is used at public engagements attended by the King or members of the royal family.

The lyrics of the 1984 version of "Advance Australia Fair" were significantly modified from McCormick's original, only retaining a now gender neutral version of the first verse and using a second verse first sung in 1901 at Federation. In January 2021, the official lyrics were changed once again, in recognition of the long habitation of Indigenous Australians.

The most common version typically performed at official functions today is a 1986 arrangement by the Hungarian-born composer Thomas Tycho.

== History ==
=== Origin ===
"Advance Australia Fair" was published in early December 1878 by Scottish-born Australian composer Peter Dodds McCormick (1833–1916) under the pen-name "Amicus" (which means 'friend' in Latin). It was first sung by Andrew Fairfax, accompanied by a concert band conducted by McCormick, at a function of the Highland Society of New South Wales in Sydney on 30 November 1878 (Saint Andrew's Day). The song gained in popularity and an amended version was sung by a choir of around 10,000 at the inauguration of the Commonwealth of Australia on 1 January 1901. In 1907, the Australian Government awarded McCormick £100 for his composition.

In a letter to R. B. Fuller dated 1 August 1913, McCormick described the circumstances that inspired him to write "Advance Australia Fair" to be sung by a large choir with band accompaniment. McCormick had attended a concert at Sydney's Exhibition Building where various national anthems were played.

This was very nicely done, but I felt very aggravated that there was not one note for Australia. On the way home in a bus, I concocted the first verse of my song & when I got home I set it to music. I first wrote it in the Tonic Sol-fa notation, then transcribed it into the Old Notation, & I tried it over on an instrument next morning, & found it correct. Strange to say there has not been a note of it altered since. Some alteration has been made in the wording, but the sense is the same. It seemed to me to be like an inspiration, & I wrote the words & music with the greatest ease.

The earliest known sound recording of "Advance Australia Fair" appears in The Landing of the Australian Troops in Egypt (c. 1916), a short commercial recording dramatizing the arrival of Australian troops in Egypt en route to Gallipoli.

Before its adoption as Australia's national anthem, "Advance Australia Fair" had considerable use elsewhere. For example, Australia's national broadcaster, the Australian Broadcasting Commission, used it to announce its radio news bulletins from 1942 to 1952. It was also frequently played at the start or end of official functions. Towards the end of World War II it was one of three songs played in certain picture theatres, along with "God Save the King" and the US national anthem, "The Star-Spangled Banner".

=== Adoption by the Whitlam government ===
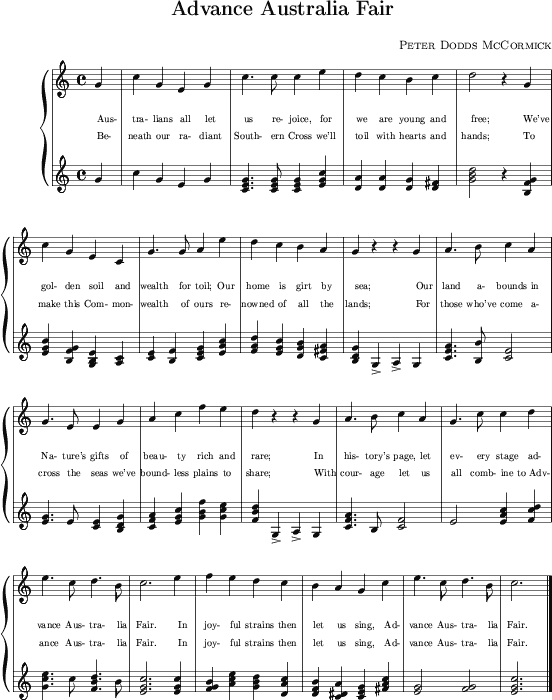
Current official music and pre-2021 lyrics

1927 band and vocal recording (three verses)
Sung by Peter Dawson

Following the collapse of British power and influence after World War II, Australia was forced to abandon its previous conception of itself as a loyal member of a wider global British community. The impetus for the creation of a new identity was described by Donald Horne as "new nationalism" in 1968. A Gallup poll indicated in 1972 that 72% of Australians now supported a new nationally distinct anthem, up from 38% in 1968. The newly elected Whitlam government of 1972 made central the elevation of distinctively Australian symbols. In this vein, Prime Minister Gough Whitlam announced in his 1973 Australia Day address that

it is essential that Australians have an anthem that fittingly embodies our national aspirations and reflects our status as an independent nation. We need an anthem that uniquely identifies our country abroad and recalls vividly to ourselves the distinctive qualities of the Australian life and the character and traditions of our nation. ... My government does not believe that our present national anthem is adequate for these purposes.

Whitlam also announced that a competition for a new anthem would be held by the Australian Council for the Arts with entrants accepted for both music and lyrics. However, despite around the 2500 entries received for lyrics and 1300 for music, the Council for the Arts could only produce a shortlist of 6 lyrics and no music, reduced from the 12 originally requested. The lyrics selected were "We'll Keep the Faith", "Advance, Australia", "Song of Australia" and three untitled verses. These were widely denounced by artists and the media, with A. D. Hope calling them "hopeless", James McAuley calling them "hopelessly bad" and The Australian describing the choices as "between the unbearable and the unforgivable". One of the judges David Williamson responded to the criticism stating "if you think these are bad, you should have seen the rest of the 2500 or so we rejected".

Many artists commentated on the difficulty of creating a national anthem in the 1970s, with Richard Meale stating that "we had missed the boat" and writer Bob Ellis stating that "You've got to leave out all the gum trees and wallabies, and you can't talk about defending the country against yellow hordes, so there's not much to talk about except an independent stance and belated pride in ourselves. Anything else would embarrass the audience." Ultimately, the government did not include any of the new entries in the final vote, with the poll only including "Advance Australia Fair", "Waltzing Matilda" and "The Song of Australia". This "indicative plebiscite" polled 60,000 people (about 0.5% of Australians at the time) nationally.

"Advance Australia Fair" was chosen by 51.4% of respondents and, on 9 April 1974, Whitlam announced in parliament that it was the national anthem, to be used on all occasions (which coincided with the national team's debut in that year's World Cup in West Germany, two months later), except those of a specifically regal nature. The choice came under attack almost immediately, with an editorial noting that "For Australians, the only consolation is that there will be very few occasions when the words are sung," and the Anglican Dean of Sydney commenting "This second-rate secular song is completely inappropriate for use in churches." Officials in four states said that Advance Australia Fair would not be played at official functions and that "God Save the Queen" would not be replaced, with Sir Harry Budd of New South Wales saying that the lyrics "are foolish and banal and their sentiments ridiculous".

During the 1975 election campaign following the dismissal of Whitlam by Sir John Kerr, David Combe proposed that the song be played at the start of the Labor Party's official campaign launch on 24 November 1975 at Festival Hall, Melbourne. Whitlam's speechwriter Graham Freudenberg rejected this idea because, among other reasons, the status of the anthem at that point was still tentative.

=== Reversion by the Fraser government ===
On 22 January 1976 the Fraser government reinstated "God Save the Queen" as the national anthem for use at royal and vice-regal events, but otherwise provided a choice between "God Save the Queen", "Advance Australia Fair", "Song of Australia" or "Waltzing Matilda" for civilian functions. The choice of four different national anthems was mocked, with The Age declaring the new anthem as "God Save Australia's Fair Matilda". His government made plans to conduct a national poll to find a song for use on ceremonial occasions when it was desired to mark a separate Australian identity, whilst maintaining "God Save The Queen" as the national anthem. This was conducted as a plebiscite to choose the National Song, held as an optional additional question in the 1977 referendum on various issues. Despite both Fraser and Whitlam advocating a vote for "Waltzing Matilda", "Advance Australia Fair" was the winner with 43.29% of the vote, defeating the three alternatives, "Waltzing Matilda" (28.28%), "The Song of Australia" (9.65%) and the existing national anthem, "God Save the Queen" (18.78%). As only the "national song", not the "national anthem", "Advance Australia Fair" did not have official lyrics and was not meant to be sung.

=== Re-adoption by the Hawke government ===
"Advance Australia Fair", with modified lyrics and reduced to two verses (see development of lyrics), was adopted as the Australian national anthem by the Labor government of Bob Hawke, coming into effect on 19 April 1984. At the same time, "God Save the King/Queen" became known as the royal anthem, and continues to be played alongside the Australian national anthem at public engagements in Australia that are attended by the King or any other members of the Royal Family.

Even though any personal copyright of Peter Dodds McCormick's original lyrics has expired, as he died in 1916, the Commonwealth of Australia claims copyright on the official lyrics and particular arrangements of music. Non-commercial use of the anthem is permitted without case-by-case permission, but the Commonwealth government requires permission for commercial use.

The orchestral arrangement of "Advance Australia Fair" that is now regularly played for Australian victories at international sporting medal ceremonies, and at the openings of major domestic sporting, cultural and community events, is by Thomas Tycho, a Jewish immigrant from Hungary. It was commissioned by ABC Music in 1984 and then televised by Channel 10 in 1986 in their Australia Day broadcast, featuring Julie Anthony as the soloist.

== Lyrics ==
The lyrics of "Advance Australia Fair", as modified by the National Australia Day Council, were officially adopted in April 1984. The lyrics were updated on 1 January 2021 in an attempt to recognise the legacy of Indigenous Australians, with the word "one" in the second line replacing the previous "young". The lyrics are now as follows:

I
Australians all let us rejoice,
For we are one and free;
We've golden soil and wealth for toil,
Our home is girt by sea;
Our land abounds in nature's gifts
Of beauty rich and rare;
In history's page, let every stage
Advance Australia fair!
In joyful strains then let us sing,
Advance Australia fair!

II
Beneath our radiant Southern Cross,
We'll toil with hearts and hands;
To make this Commonwealth of ours
Renowned of all the lands;
For those who've come across the seas
We've boundless plains to share;
With courage let us all combine
To advance Australia fair.
In joyful strains then let us sing
Advance Australia fair!

== Development of lyrics ==
Since the original lyrics were written in 1878, there have been several changes, in some cases with the intent of altering the anthem's political focus especially in regard to gender neutrality and Indigenous Australians. Some of these have been minor while others have significantly altered the song. The original song was four verses long. For its 1984 adoption as the national anthem, the song was cut from the four verses to two. The first verse was kept largely as the 1878 original, except for the change in the first line from "Australia's sons let us rejoice" to "Australians all let us rejoice". The second, third and fourth verses of the original were dropped, in favour of a modified version of the new third verse which was sung at Federation in 1901.

The lyrics published in the second edition (1879) were as follows:

I
Australia's sons let us rejoice,
For we are young and free;
We've golden soil and wealth for toil,
Our home is girt by sea;
Our land abounds in nature's gifts
Of beauty rich and rare;
In history's page, let every stage
Advance Australia fair.
In joyful strains let us sing,
Advance, Australia fair.

II
When gallant Cook from Albion sail'd,
To trace wide oceans o'er,
True British courage bore him on,
Til he landed on our shore.
Then here he raised Old England's flag,
The standard of the brave;
"With all her faults we love her still"
"Britannia rules the wave."
In joyful strains then let us sing,
Advance, Australia fair.

III
While other nations of the globe
Behold us from afar,
We'll rise to high renown and shine
Like our glorious southern star;
From England soil and Fatherland,
Scotia and Erin fair,
Let all combine with heart and hand
To advance Australia fair.
In joyful strains then let us sing
Advance, Australia fair.

IV
Should foreign foe e'er sight our coast,
Or dare a foot to land,
We'll rouse to arms like sires of yore,
To guard our native strand;
Britannia then shall surely know,
Though oceans roll between,
Her sons in fair Australia's land
Still keep their courage green.
In joyful strains then let us sing
Advance Australia fair.

The 1901 Federation version of the third verse was originally sung as:

III
Beneath our radiant Southern Cross,
We'll toil with hearts and hands;
To make our youthful Commonwealth,
Renowned of all the lands;
For loyal sons beyond the seas
We've boundless plains to share;
With courage let us all combine
To advance Australia fair.
In joyful strains then let us sing
Advance Australia fair!

The lyrics of "Advance Australia Fair", as modified by the National Australia Day Council and officially adopted on 19 April 1984, were as follows:

I
Australians all let us rejoice,
For we are young and free;
We've golden soil and wealth for toil;
Our home is girt by sea;
Our land abounds in nature's gifts
Of beauty rich and rare;
In history's page, let every stage
Advance Australia Fair.
In joyful strains then let us sing,
Advance Australia Fair.

II
Beneath our radiant Southern Cross
We'll toil with hearts and hands;
To make this Commonwealth of ours
Renowned of all the lands;
For those who've come across the seas
We've boundless plains to share;
With courage let us all combine
To Advance Australia Fair.
In joyful strains then let us sing,
Advance Australia Fair.

These lyrics were updated on 1 January 2021 to the current version, in which "young" in the second line is replaced with "one" to reflect the pre-colonial presence of Indigenous Australians, who have lived in Australia much longer than non-Indigenous Australians.

== Criticism ==
=== General criticism ===
In May 1976, after reinstating "God Save the Queen", Fraser advised the Australian Olympic Federation to use "Waltzing Matilda" as the national anthem for the forthcoming Montreal Olympic Games. (Note: Australia did not win any gold medals at the event, so "Waltzing Matilda" did not end up being played in any event.) Fraser responded to criticism of "Waltzing Matilda" compared with "Advance Australia Fair", and countered, "in the second verse... we find these words, 'Britannia rules the waves'."

The fourth line of the anthem, "our home is girt by sea", has been criticised for using the archaic word "girt". Additionally, the lyrics and melody of the Australian national anthem have been criticised in some quarters as being dull and unendearing to the Australian people. National Party senator Sandy Macdonald said in 2001 that "'Advance Australia Fair' is so boring that the nation risks singing itself to sleep, with boring music and words impossible to understand". Australian composer and author Andrew Ford noted that the melody of the last line of "Advance Australia Fair" is identical to the final line of "God Bless the Prince of Wales".

Craig Emerson of the Australian Labor Party has critiqued the anthem, and former MP Peter Slipper has said that Australia should consider another anthem. In 2011, former Victorian Premier Jeff Kennett called for "I Am Australian" to become Australia's national anthem, while former Australian Labor Party leader Kim Beazley defended it, stating: the current "National Anthem is not contradictory to an Australian republic".

=== Recognition of Indigenous Australians ===
The song has been criticised for failing to represent or acknowledge Australia's Indigenous peoples and aspects of the country's colonial past, leading to modification. The lyrics have been accused of celebrating British colonisation and perpetuating the concept of terra nullius; the now-changed second line of the anthem ("for we are young and free") was criticised in particular for ignoring the long history of Indigenous Australians. It has also been suggested that the word "fair" celebrates the "civilising" mission of British colonists.

Since about 2015, public debate about the anthem has increased. Boxer Anthony Mundine stated in 2013, 2017 and 2018 that he would not stand for the anthem, prompting organisers not to play it before his fights. In September 2018 a 9-year-old Brisbane girl was disciplined by her school after refusing to stand for the national anthem; her actions were applauded by some public commentators, and criticised by others. In 2019, several National Rugby League football players decided not to sing the anthem before the first match of the State of Origin series and before the Indigenous All-Stars series with New Zealand; NRL coach and celebrated former player Mal Meninga supported the protesting players and called for a referendum on the subject.

Several alternative versions of "Advance Australia Fair" have been proposed to address the alleged exclusion of Indigenous Australians. Judith Durham of the Seekers and Muthi Muthi musician Kutcha Edwards released their alternative lyrics in 2009, replacing "for we are young and free" with the opening lines "Australians let us stand as one, upon this sacred land". In 2015, Aboriginal Australian soprano Deborah Cheetham declined an invitation to sing the anthem at the 2015 AFL Grand Final after the AFL turned down her request to replace the words "for we are young and free" with "in peace and harmony". She has advocated for the lyrics being rewritten and endorsed Durham and Edwards' alternative version.

In 2017 the Recognition in Anthem Project was established and began work on a new version, with lyrics written by poet and former Victorian Supreme Court judge Peter Vickery following consultation with Indigenous communities and others. Vickery's proposed lyrics replaced "we are young and free" with "we are one and free" in the first verse, deleted the second and added two new ones; the second verse acknowledging Indigenous history, immigration and calls for unity and respect, and the third adapting lines from the official second verse. It was debuted at the Desert Song Festival in Alice Springs by an Aboriginal choir. Former prime minister Bob Hawke endorsed Vickery's alternative lyrics in 2018. In 2017, the federal government under then-prime minister Malcolm Turnbull granted permission for Vickery's lyrics to be sung at certain occasions as a "patriotic song", but said that before making any official change to the anthem, "The Government would need to be convinced of a sufficient groundswell of support in the wider community".

In November 2020, NSW Premier Gladys Berejiklian proposed changing one word in the opening couplet, from "we are young and free" to "we are one and free", to acknowledge Australia's Indigenous history. The proposal was supported by the federal Minister for Indigenous Australians, Ken Wyatt, and in December 2020 Prime Minister Scott Morrison announced that he would be advising the governor-general to proclaim the change, to take effect on 1 January 2021. The new wording was highlighted in the No case of the official referendum pamphlet of the 2023 Australian Indigenous Voice referendum to support arguments against purported "divisive" constitutional changes.

== Dharawal lyrics ==
Lyrics for the anthem have been written several times in the Dharug language, an Australian Aboriginal language spoken around Sydney by the Dharawal people. Jacqueline Troy published a version in 2003.

Another version by actor and educator Richard Green was performed in July 2010, at a rugby league State of Origin match in Sydney.

In December 2020, another setting in Dharug, followed by the anthem in English, was sung before a rugby union international between Australia and Argentina.

== Other unofficial variants ==
In 2011, about fifty different Christian schools from different denominations came under criticism for singing an unofficial version of the song written by the Sri Lankan immigrant Ruth Ponniah in 1988. The song replaced the official second verse of "Advance Australia Fair" with lyrics that were Christian in nature.

With Christ our head and cornerstone, we'll build our nation's might
Whose way and truth and light alone, can guide our path aright
Our lives a sacrifice of love, reflect our master's care
With faces turned to heav'n above, Advance Australia Fair
In joyful strains then let us sing, Advance Australia Fair.

Minister for Education Peter Garrett and chief executive of the National Australia Day Council Warren Pearson admonished the schools for modifying the lyrics of the anthem, and the Australian Parents Council and the Federation of Parents and Citizens' Association of NSW called for a ban on the modified song. Stephen O'Doherty, chief executive of Christian Schools Australia, defended the use of the lyrics in response.
