= The Song of Australia =

1859 Australian patriotic song

The tune of "The Song of Australia."

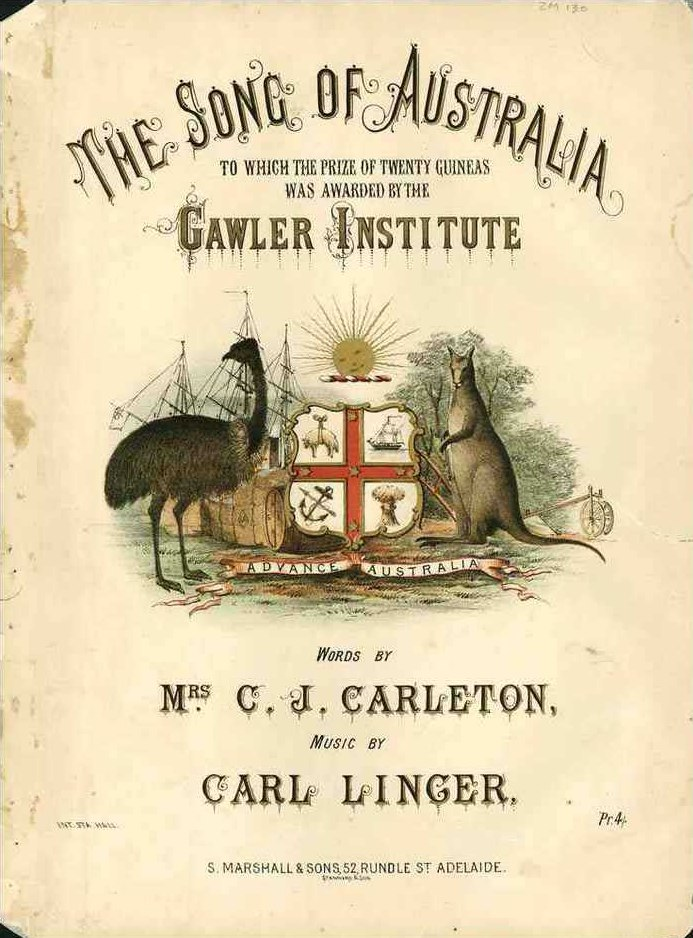
Cover of the Marshall and Sons edition, ca. 1877

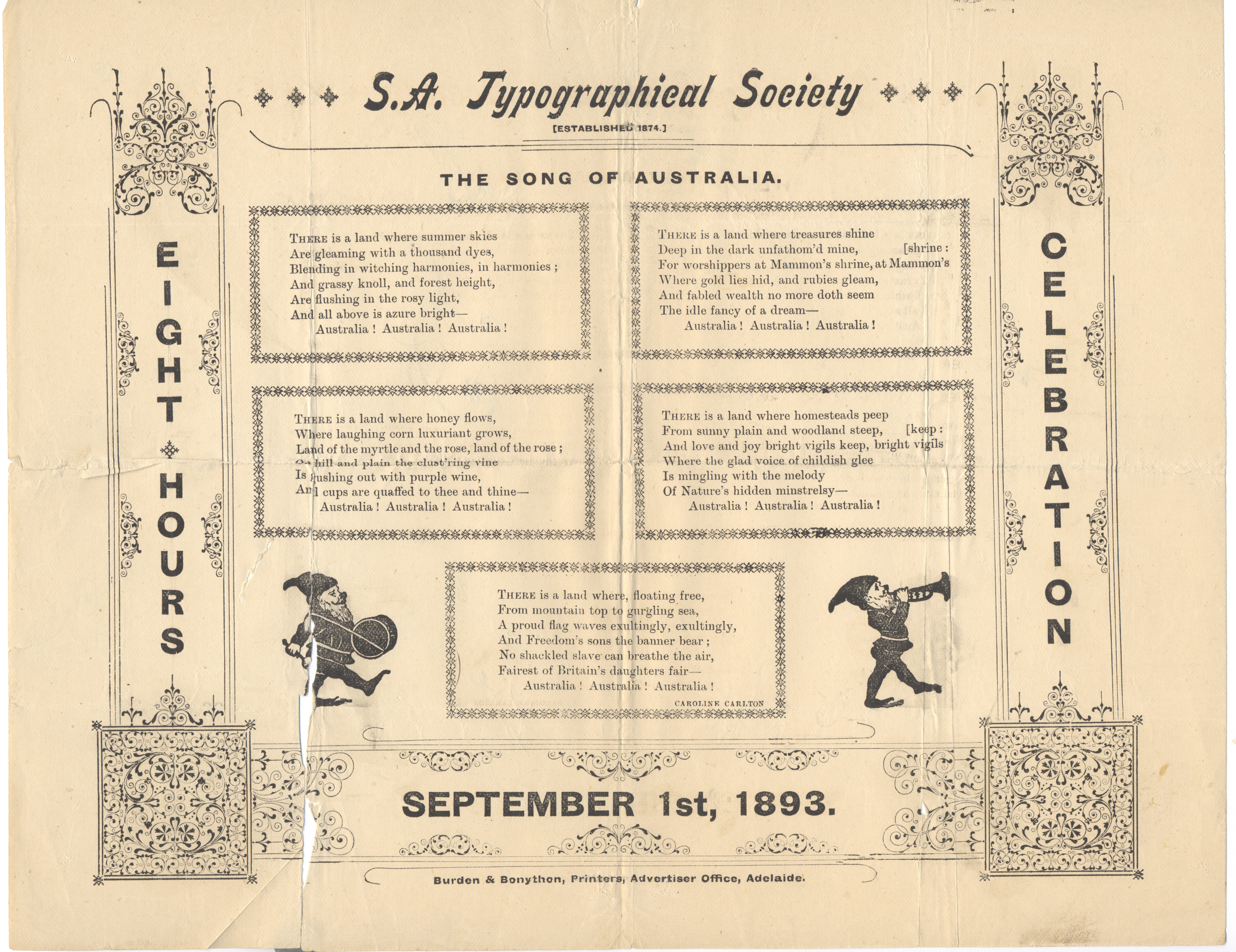
S.A. Typographical Society Eight Hour Celebration reprint of the poem by Caroline Carlton [sic], 1893

"The Song of Australia" was composed as the result of 1859 competition to create a "patriotic song", sponsored by the Gawler Institute in Adelaide. The winning lyrics were written by an English-born poet, Caroline Carleton, and the music chosen by the judges was composed by the German-born Carl Linger (1810–1862), a prominent member of the Australian Forty-Eighters.

It was one of the options in the 1977 plebiscite to choose a new Australian National Anthem, in which it was preferred by South Australians, but lost in the other states to "Advance Australia Fair".

== Contest ==
On 1 October 1859, the South Australian Register announced:

A PRIZE of TEN GUINEAS open to South Australia is offered by the Gawler Institute for the WORDS of a PATRIOTIC SONG, to be entitled "The Song of Australia". Copyright of words to which the Prize may be awarded to become the property of the Gawler Institute.

Judges: John H. Barrow, Esq., M.P.; John Brown, Esq.; (Note: Perhaps John Brown, the immigration agent, who arrived on the Africaine as part of the First Fleet of South Australia, was editor of the Adelaide Times, and died 17 August 1879) John Howard Clark, Esq.; Hon. A. Forster, M.L.C.; W. A. Wearing, Esq.; E. J. Peake, Esq., M.P.

Competitors are free to adopt any treatment of subject or rhythmical measure, so long as the composition is in accordance with the title and suitable for musical expression. Each competitor to write on the outside of the envelope covering the composition (which must not bear the name of the author, but a motto) the words "Poem for Prize"; and in a second envelope to enclose his name, written outside the motto corresponding with that attached to the composition. Of those letters containing the names of the competitors, that alone will be opened which bears the motto of the successful composition.

All communications must be made by October 14, and addressed to George Isaacs, Gawler.

A few weeks later, the judges announced the winner, and the second stage of the competition:

THE GAWLER PRIZE SONG.- AWARD OF THE JUDGES.

Gawler Institute, October 20, 1859.

The Prize of Ten Guineas for the best words for a Patriotic Song has been awarded by the Judges to Mrs. C. J. Carleton. Adelaide.

The Committee regret that their funds will not permit their distributing other prizes to various meritorious productions contributed, but in order to encourage native talent they intend publishing a careful selection from amongst them. Any of the competitors objecting to their contribution being so published will please to signify the same, by letter, to Mr George Isaacs, Gawler (subscribed with the motto previously used), on or before the 31st inst., otherwise their sanction will be inferred. Any competitors desiring their names to be attached to their contributions will please give permission to the Committee to open the envelopes inscribed with their mottoes.

PRIZE FOR MUSIC

GAWLER INSTITUTE.

A TEN GUINEA PRIZE is offered by the Gawler Institute for the MUSIC to "The Song of Australia", by Mrs. C. J. Carleton, published in this day's paper, subject to the following conditions, viz.:- That the air be written in the G clef, and in any key the composer may select; but not to range below lower C or above upper G. The chorus (if any) to be written for three or four voices.

A pianoforte part to be added as an ad libitum accompaniment. Each competitor to send in two copies. The music to bear a motto, but no name. The cover to be inscribed " Music for Prize"; and in a second envelope the competitor will enclose his name, writing outside the envelope the motto corresponding with that attached to the composition.

Judges: G. W. Chinner, Esq.; F. S. Dutton, Esq., M.P.; A. Ewing, Esq.; (Note: Alexander Ewing (1830–1895) was a member of the Commissariat staff, assistant to Frederick Sowter Monk (or Monck), Deputy Assistant Commissary General. Ewing was notable as the composer of the hymn "Jerusalem the Golden", often attributed to his uncle, Alexander Ewing, Bishop of Argyll.) W. Holden, Esq.

All communications to be addressed to Mr George Isaacs, Gawler, and forwarded not later than the 30th October, 1850.

The winner was announced in early November:

GAWLER PRIZE MUSIC — The Judges who had undertaken to decide upon the music set to the 'Song of Australia' met yesterday, and, after due examination, agreed to the following report: — "The Judges appointed to award the prize for the best musical composition set to the words of the prize song, entitled 'The Song of Australia,' met on Friday, the 4th November— present, Messrs. Dutton, Ewing, Chinner, and Holden. Twenty-three compositions were examined, and the prize was unanimously awarded to the composition bearing the motto 'One of the Quantity.' Those bearing the mottoes 'Long Live our Gracious Queen,' 'Garibaldi,' and 'Con Amore' so nearly equalled the prize composition in merit that the Judges had great difficulty in coming to a decision.

Francis S. Dutton; A. Ewing; Geo. W. Chinner; Wm. Holden"

Immediately upon receiving this report we telegraphed to the Secretary of the Gawler Institute to ascertain the name of the successful competitor, and we find from his reply that the composer who has thus distinguished himself is Mr Carl Linger.

== Lyrics ==
This is the poem as published in The South Australian Register on 21 October 1859:

THE SONG OF AUSTRALIA by Mrs. C. J. CARLETON, West-terrace.

There is a land where summer skies
Are gleaming with a thousand dyes,
Blending in witching harmonies;
And grassy knoll and forest height,
Are flushing in the rosy light,
And all above is azure bright — Australia!

There is a land where honey flows,
Where laughing corn luxuriant grows,
Land of the myrtle and the rose;
On hill and plain the clust'ring vine
Is gushing out with purple wine,
And cups are quaffed to thee and thine — Australia!

There is a land where treasures shine
Deep in the dark unfathom'd mine
For worshippers at Mammon's shrine;
Where gold lies hid, and rubies gleam,
And fabled wealth no more doth seem
The idle fancy of a dream — Australia!

There is a land where homesteads peep
From sunny plain and woodland steep,
And love and joy bright vigils keep;
Where the glad voice of childish glee
Is mingling with the melody
Of nature's hidden minstrelsy — Australia!

There is a land where, floating free,
From mountain-top to girdling sea,
A proud flag waves exultingly;
And FREEDOM'S sons the banner bear,
No shackled slave can breathe the air,
Fairest of Britain's daughters fair — Australia!

== Criticism ==
Publication of Caroline Carleton's poem caused immediate controversy, generally along the lines that it was nice poetry, but "too tame". One person regretted that nothing more inspiring than the colour of the sky and the prettiness of the scenery could be found for the poem. Another wondered "how hidden wealth could gleam in the darkness". Someone else complained that the poem could equally refer to, say, California, while another commentator longed for a time when such a peaceful song accorded with international politics, and regretted that the contest was restricted to South Australians, that the prize was so paltry, and there was no mention of sheep.

The Advertiser of 24 October, gave a spirited defence of the judges, and of Mrs. Carleton's poem, culminating in several parodies purporting to be the "real Song of Australia".

== Performances and public reaction ==
One of its first public performances was by the Adelaide Liedertafel, conducted by Herr Linger, for a South Australian Institute soirée at White's Rooms, King William Street, Adelaide, on 14 December 1859.

The song, played by orchestra and chorus under Professor Joshua Ives, was a feature of the opening ceremony of the Adelaide Jubilee International Exhibition in 1887.

"Song of Australia" was a particular favourite of the Australian baritone Peter Dawson. who called it "the finest national anthem ever written". His notable performances included:

- Recital in London as a duet with Richard Nitschke in 1905.
- Duet with Clara Serena at Wembley on (the then) Australia Day 24 July 1924.
- A gramophone recording His Master's Voice EA1003 of Dawson and vocal quartet singing "Song of Australia" was released in 1932.

In June, 1936, in conjunction with the German-Australian Centenary celebrations, a memorial to Carl Linger was unveiled at the West Terrace Cemetery and its chairman, Heinrich Krawinkel, announced the imminent broadcast of "Song of Australia" from the short-wave transmitters of Radio Berlin.

== Proposed national anthem ==
In 1924, George Edwin Yates, the federal member for Adelaide, proposed in parliament that the song be adopted as the national anthem. He proceeded to sing the first verse, despite the objections of his fellow members.

The song was one of four included in a national plebiscite to choose Australia's national song in 1977. Nationwide it was the least popular of the four choices, but it had the distinction of being the most popular choice in South Australia. This result can be attributed to the fact of "Advance Australia Fair" being exposed to schoolchildren in the more populous States, where "The Song of Australia" was sung in schools only in South Australia and, to a lesser extent, in Western Australia and Tasmania.

The four songs in the plebiscite were "Waltzing Matilda"; the then anthem, "God Save the Queen"; the now current anthem, "Advance Australia Fair"; and "Song of Australia".

== In popular culture ==
"Song of Australia" is featured in the TV series ANZAC Girls, episode 4, "Love", in which the Peter Dawson recording is played on a wind-up gramophone in several scenes, and sung in snatches by "Pat Dooley" (Brandon McClelland) while digging a latrine pit.

== See also ==
- "My Bougainville", the anthem of the Autonomous Region of Bougainville, is sung to the tune of "The Song of Australia"
