= Adelaide Times =

Former newspaper in Adelaide, South Australia

The Adelaide Times was an early newspaper founded by James Allen and printed in Adelaide, the capital of the then colony of South Australia. It was published between 2 October 1848 and 8 May 1858, and evolved through a series of names and publication frequencies, and closed due to uncertainty surrounding Allen's bankruptcy.

== History ==
The Adelaide Times was established by Allen, an experienced newspaper man, in partnership with John Brown and William Barlow Gilbert, and had just returned from a visited to England, 1845–1848. He had previously worked on other local newspapers, the Southern Australian and South Australian Register, and periodicals such as South Australian Magazine and Monthly Almanac and Illustrated Commentator.

The newspaper's original format and masthead were copied from The Times of London. It was published weekly from October 1848; semiweekly from October 1849; three times a week from March 1850; and, daily from April 1850. As was common for the time, it evolved through various titles, such as The Adelaide Times and General Commercial Advertiser (15 January 1849 – 10 September 1849) and The Times (6 March 1850 – 16 November 1853).

In November 1853 Allen sold the newspaper to a consortium, including Richard Hanson, Robert Torrens, George Stevenson, John Brown, and Edward Gwynne. W. M. Akhurst, who was reporter and sub-editor, resigned rather than work under the new owners. The Adelaide Times was later sold to Allen's former partner, Gilbert, but in 1855 Gilbert went bankrupt and the newspaper was re-purchased by Allen, who himself went bankrupt in early 1858.

Shortly afterwards, Rev. John Henry Barrow, a former editor of the South Australian Register, founded the morning newspaper The South Australian Advertiser and a companion weekly The South Australian Weekly Chronicle.

William B. Gilbert, not to be confused with the politician or the pastoralist, was a nephew of Thomas Gilbert, the first Colonial Storekeeper, and arrived in South Australia in 1847. He became associated with the Adelaide Times in 1848. On 17 November 1851, he was appointed clerk of the Legislative Council, and was present at the passing of the Bullion Act. On 11 March 1852, he became a clerk in the Government Assay Office, which was closed on 3 February 1853. From 1851 to 1858 he was connected with the South Australian Weekly Dispatch, a descendant of the Adelaide Times. He later moved to Victoria, where he worked for The Argus and became a reporter for the Victorian Hansard. Gilbert next returned to Adelaide, where he held various Government positions, his last being in the Census Office. Gilbert was widely known and very highly respected. He died on 13 March 1893, aged 67, survived by his widow.
