= Caroline Carleton =

Anglo-Australian poet (1811–1874)

Carol Carleton
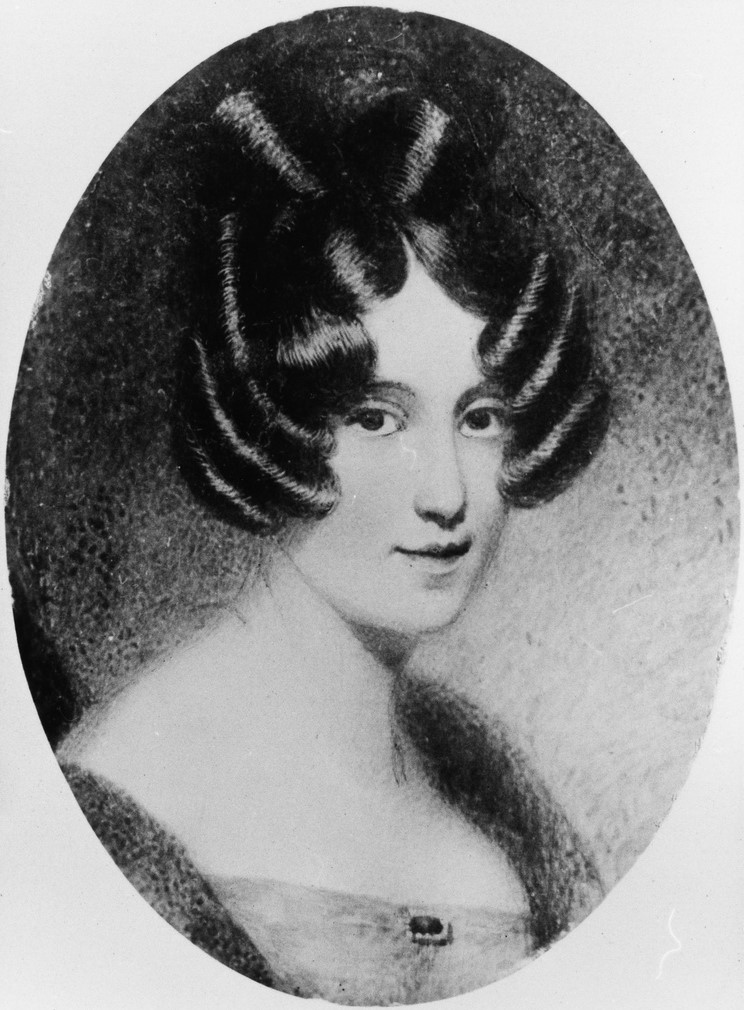

Personal details
- Born: Caroline Baynes; 6 October 1811 Bethnal Green, Middlesex, England
- Died: 10 July 1874 (aged 62) Matta House, Kadina, South Australia
- Spouse: Charles Carleton (m. 1836; died 1861)
- Children: 7
- Profession: Poet, writer

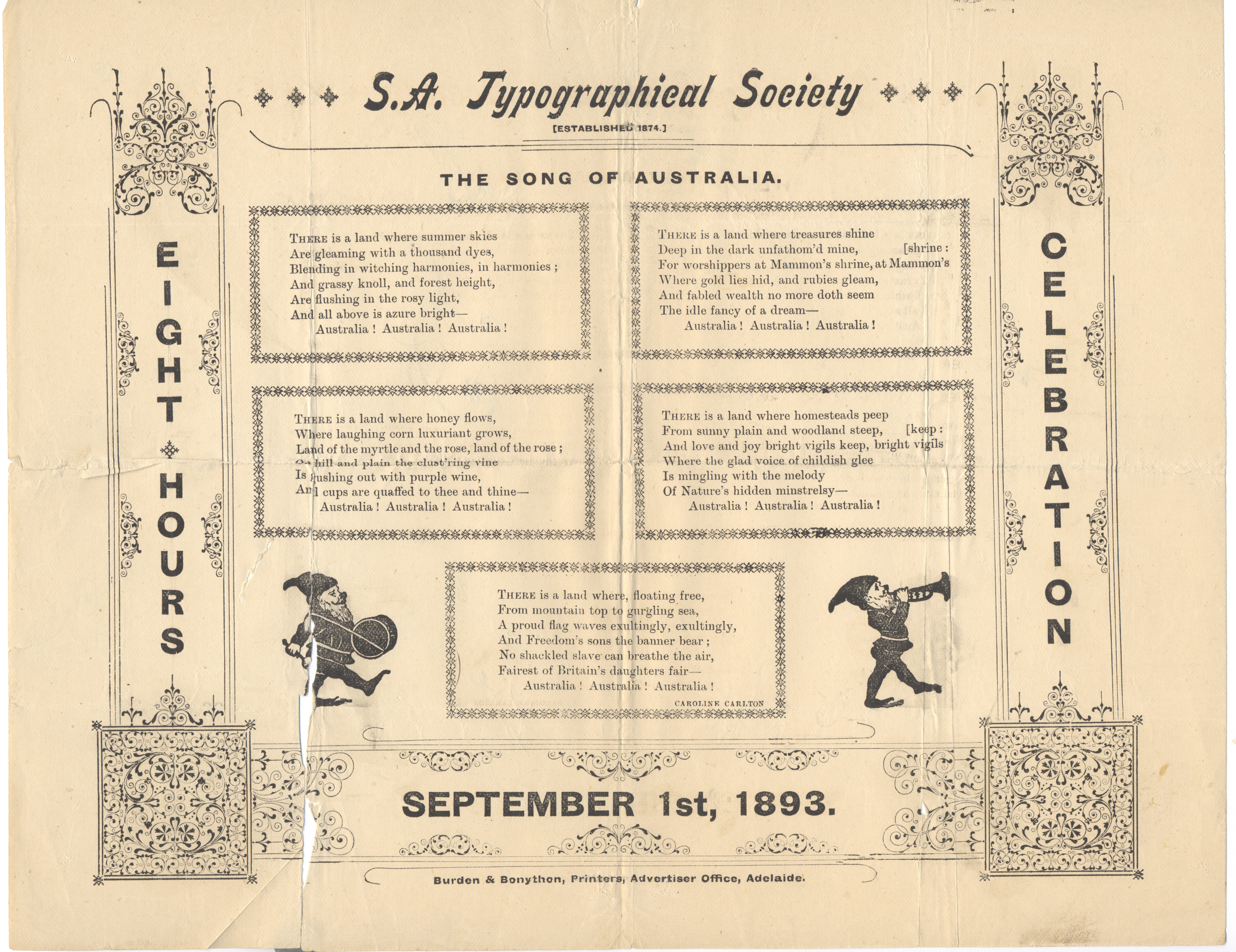
S.A. Typographical Society Eight Hour Celebration reprint of "The Song of Australia" by Caroline Carlton [sic]

Caroline Carleton (6 October 1811 – 10 July 1874) was an English-born South Australian poet who is best known for her prize-winning poem "Song of Australia", which, put to a tune by Carl Linger, was used as a patriotic song in South Australian schools and elsewhere, and was one of four options in a 1977 national plebiscite to select a National Song.

Caroline Baynes was born at Bonnar's Hall (also written Bonner's Hall), Middlesex near London, the youngest child of bookseller William Baynes (29 May 1760 – 7 January 1832) and his second wife Mary Ann (née Bailey) (1771–1862). Although her birthdate is generally given as 1820, this may have been a useful fiction, as baptism records give the 1811 date.

She was highly intelligent and received a good education. She could converse in French and Italian, was well-versed in Latin, and played pianoforte and harp. In 1836, at West Hackney (perhaps on York Road near modern Dalston?), she married Charles James Carleton, a medical student working at Guy's Hospital and who could claim a family connection with the Earls of Dorchester. Together with their two young children (James Poole Carleton born 23 April 1839 and one other) they left for Australia in 1839, on the Prince Regent. It was a rough passage and both children died and were buried at sea. The passengers disembarked at Glenelg on 26 September 1839.

== Charles' activities ==
After a few false starts making cordials, castor oil, and other commodities, Charles (who never completed his degree) became around 1844 medical dispenser to the Colonial Surgeon, Mr. James George Nash F.R.C.S. They may have resided at the Adelaide Hospital, where Caroline had two more children. In 1842 he was assayer with Alexander Tolmer's expedition to Mount Alexander which subsequently escorted a quarter of a ton of gold to Adelaide. In 1845 he and a Dr. Davy built a trial lead-smelting furnace. In 1847 they moved to Kapunda, where Charles was employed as assayer and perhaps as medical officer.

In 1849, they returned to Adelaide, where he opened a chemist's shop at 37 Hindley Street, then in August 1851 to c. 51 Rundle Street He visited the gold diggings at Forest Creek, Victoria, perhaps working as an assayer and gold buyer, and returned to his Rundle Street shop with new advertising directed at miners. The shop was taken over early in 1853 by James Parkinson. and throughout 1853 to May 1854 he was selling bottled English porter and stout at Blyth's Building, Hindley Street.

He was returning officer for Grey Ward in the 1855 Census.

He took a position as superintendent of the West Terrace Cemetery in November 1855, He died on 20 July 1861 and was buried at the same cemetery. For the last two years as his health deteriorated, most of the work was done by Caroline.

== The Song of Australia ==
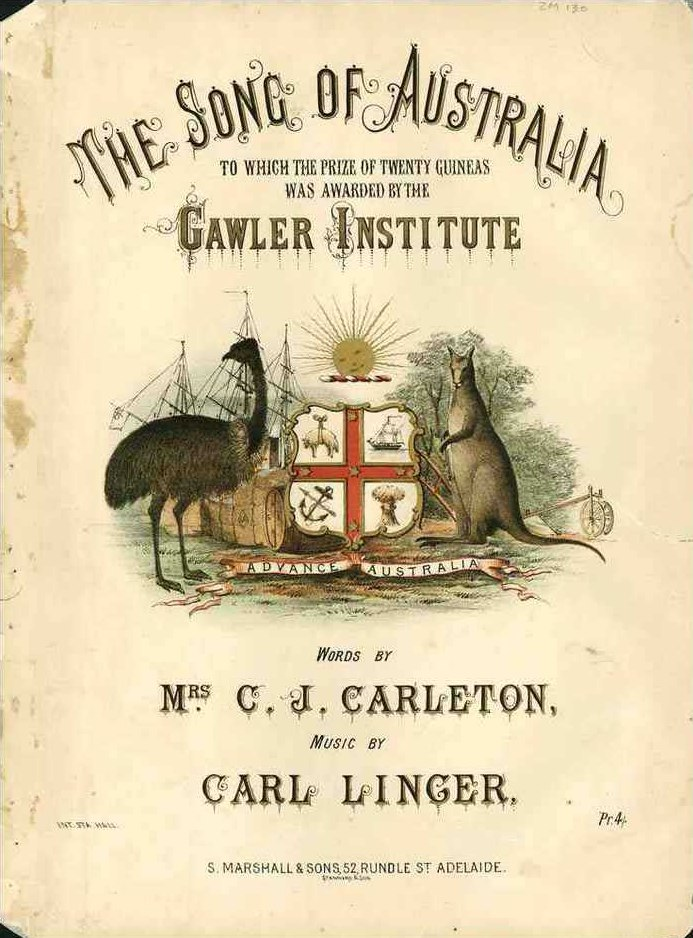
Song sheet c. 1877

It was while at the cemetery in 1859 that she wrote The Song of Australia in response to the Gawler Institute's contest for a patriotic poem that could be set to music, and submitted it under the pseudonym "Nil Desperandum". Her poem won the prize of ten guineas (£10 10s.); several thousand dollars by today's values.

The second stage of the Gawler Institute's contest was for a tune for the winning poem as published on 21 October 1859. Again, the prize was ten guineas. The winner, announced on 4 November 1859 was Carl Linger, whose pseudonym was "One of the Quantity".

Their song was performed at the South Australian Institute soirée at White's Rooms, King William Street, on 14 December 1859 by the Adelaide Liedertafel, conducted by Herr Linger.

== Later life ==
With the death of her husband in 1861, she applied for the job as curator of the cemetery but was refused. As was the resort of many well-educated women left without an income, she founded a school for girls at Waterhouse's Building, 231 North Terrace, in 1861, but insufficient income to run her establishment forced her insolvency in 1867. She reopened her school in Tavistock Street in 1868, then Hanson Street in 1869, then in 1870 or 1871 moved to the bustling city of Wallaroo where her daughter Amy had a school (a photograph, c. 1874, may be viewed here). She may have made several trips between Adelaide and the "copper triangle" of Moonta, Kadina and Wallaroo. It was during one of these trips, while staying at "Matta House" near Kadina that she died. It is likely that she was given the use of this house by the manager of Moonta Mines, the mining magnate and patron of the arts and sciences William Austin Horn (1841–1922) who published Bush Echoes on his return to England.

Caroline was buried in the Wallaroo cemetery on 12 July 1874. During the South Australian Centenary, on 13 March 1936, some three thousand citizens and eight hundred schoolchildren made a pilgrimage to her graveside. The stone also memorialises Charles James her husband and Charles James her son.

Carleton Crescent, Wallaroo and Carleton Street, in the Canberra suburb of Kambah, are named in her honour.

== Family ==
Charles James Carleton (c. 1814 – 20 July 1861) married Caroline Baynes (6 October 1811 – 10 July 1874) in 1836; they had two children before emigrating; both died en voyage. Children born in Australia include:

- Caroline Carleton (7 October 1840 – 13 November 1920) married Rev. Henry Martyn Pollitt (1843 – 5 December 1908) on 2 October 1866. He was the eldest son of Rev. James Pollitt.
- Mariana (3 April 1843 – 1 February 1935) married John Jerard Rhead (c. 1835 – 24 March 1904) on 3 April 1877, moved to Northam, Western Australia
- Amy Sophia Person Carleton (16 April 1849 – 18 April 1931) left Wallaroo for Northam in 1886, established Greywell School
- Charles James Carleton (13 September 1851 – 7 July 1875) was a prize-winning student of the Adelaide Educational Institution in 1863 (but possibly only that year, as his mother's financial situation was precarious), opened a cordial manufacturing business with Alfred John Todd on Cherry Street, Southport near Darwin, Northern Territory in 1874 (partnership dissolved in May 1874). He died at Howley Creek; he was in the process of taking over the Quartz Reef Hotel at Howley Crossing in the gold-mining town of Howley, not far from Hayes Creek. His name is recorded on the headstone of his mother, who died almost exactly a year earlier.
- Alice Carleton (5 September 1853 – 18 September 1885) married chemist George Alfred Parker (c. 1851 – 28 June 1907) on 11 November 1879

== Myths and misconceptions ==
A number of misconceptions have been perpetrated (and perpetuated) about Caroline:

- She was born on some (unspecified) date in 1820. False. Thanks to the Internet and the work of Baynes family researchers, it is now known that she was born on 6 October 1811.
- That she had a middle name. False. "Caroline J. Carleton" is a misnomer, probably arising from her "married" name of Mrs. C. J. (for Charles James) Carleton.
- Caroline commissioned Carl Linger to write the tune. False. There is no evidence they met before the contest; the contests and judging were separate.
- Caroline used the pseudonym "Nil Desperandum" to hide the fact she was a woman. False. It was a condition of both stages of the contest that a pseudonym be used, for "blind" judging.
- Caroline and Carl Linger shared the prize. False. The two contests were run sequentially, had different judges and separate prizes.

== Poetry ==
Song of Australia was published in The South Australian Register on 21 October 1859. Other poems by Caroline Carleton were contained in South Australian Lyrics published and printed in Adelaide by J.H. Lewis, 1860. This slim (18pp.) volume includes:

- Fragmentary Lines Written in a Cemetery
- Loss of the Dunbar
- Lines – On observing the light of two lamps in the Town form a Triangle with a conspicuous Star in the Evening Sky
- Summer's Evening Reverie
- The Echo of the Waves
- The Flowers of Australia
- Lines – on the Indian Relief Fund
- The Cawnpore Massacre
- South Australian Song

Written on the occasion of the presentation of a Silver Bowl to the Mayor and Corporation of Adelaide by the Founders of the Colony.

- On Recovering from Illness
- To the River Torrens – written in 1840
- Tributary Lines
- On the Suicide of a Young Lady
- The Old Gum Tree

Written in Commemoration of the 21st Anniversary of the Proclamation of the Colony.

- A Wondrous Tale – Dedicated to the Author of "The Legend of Kupirri"
- The Wreck of the Admella
- The Rescue
