= 1977 Australian plebiscite (National Song) =

Additional question in the 1977 Australian referendum

Australian National Song Poll
11 May 1977
- Turnout: 7,069,046 (89.06%)
Candidate	"Advance Australia Fair"	"Waltzing Matilda"	"God Save The Queen"
First preferences	43.29%	28.28%	18.78%
Two-song preferred	65.23%	34.77%	–
Candidate	"Song of Australia"
First preferences	9.65%
Two-song preferred	–
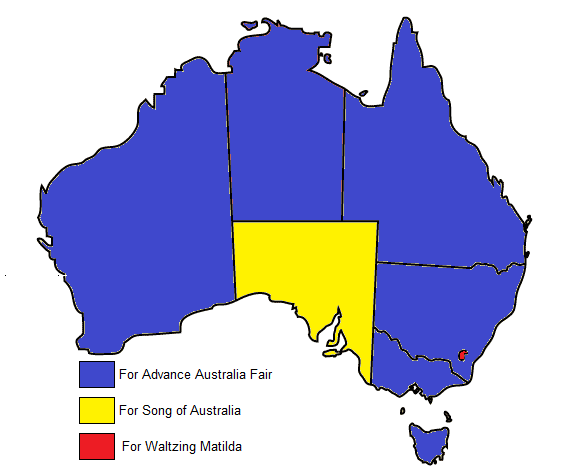
- Map of results by state. Blue indicates a state voted for Advance Australia Fair, yellow for Song of Australia, and red for Waltzing Matilda

As an additional question in the 1977 referendum, voters were polled on which tune they would prefer to be used as the "national song", to be used alongside the then national anthem, "God Save the Queen". Technically, the vote concerned only the tune to be used, with new lyrics potentially chosen at a later date. Voting on this question was not compulsory. This was the third national plebiscite to be held in Australia, following two regarding conscription in 1916 and 1917.

"Advance Australia Fair", was the winner, however it was not legally declared to be the national song. Subsequently, in 1984 the song was declared the national anthem with lyrics significantly modified from the original.

== Background ==
Prior to 1974, "God Save the Queen" was Australia's national anthem. In 1974, the Whitlam government performed a nationwide opinion survey, conducted through the Australian Bureau of Statistics, to determine the song to be sung on occasions of national significance. "Advance Australia Fair" was chosen and announced as the new national anthem, to be used on all occasions excepting those of a specifically regal nature.

On 22 January 1976 the Fraser government reinstated "God Save the Queen" as the national anthem for use at royal and vice-regal events, but otherwise provided a choice between "God Save the Queen", "Advance Australia Fair", "Song of Australia" or "Waltzing Matilda" for civilian functions. His government made plans to conduct a national poll to find a song for use on ceremonial occasions when it was desired to mark a separate Australian identity, whilst maintaining "God Save The Queen" as the national anthem. The plebiscite was an optional additional question in the 1977 referendum on various issues. Despite both Fraser and Whitlam advocating a vote for "Waltzing Matilda", "Advance Australia Fair" was the winner with 43.29% of the vote, defeating the three alternatives, "Waltzing Matilda" (28.28%), "The Song of Australia" (9.65%) and the existing national anthem, "God Save the Queen" (18.78%). After the distribution of preferences, "Advance Australia Fair" was preferred by 65.23% over "Waltzing Matilda" at 34.77%.

== Results ==
Voters were presented with the following question: (Note: Handbook of the 44th Parliament (2014) "Part 5 - Referendums and Plebiscites - Plebiscite results". Parliamentary Library of Australia.)

Against the background that 'GOD SAVE THE QUEEN' is the NATIONAL ANTHEM to be played on Regal and Vice Regal occasions, electors may indicate their preferences as to which of the tunes of the songs listed below they would prefer to be played on other occasions.

Result
State	Electoral roll	Ballots issued	"God Save the Queen"		"Advance Australia Fair"		"The Song of Australia"		"Waltzing Matilda"		Informal	
State	Electoral roll	Ballots issued	Vote	%	Vote	%	Vote	%	Vote	%	Vote	%
New South Wales	3,007,511	2,537,805	348,885	15.32	1,169,421	51.35	121,456	5.33	637,795	28.00	260,248	11.43
Victoria	2,252,831	1,951,160	352,603	20.68	683,451	40.09	110,591	6.49	557,991	32.73	246,524	14.46
Queensland	1,241,426	1,056,804	204,453	21.38	438,929	45.90	61,234	6.40	251,609	26.31	100,579	10.52
South Australia	799,243	706,392	114,477	18.07	152,507	24.07	215,085	33.95	151,434	23.90	72,889	11.51
Western Australia	682,291	487,879	113,054	23.17	183,159	37.54	75,524	15.48	116,142	23.81	68,394	14.02
Tasmania	259,081	253,525	47,346	22.38	88,825	41.98	21,091	9.97	54,329	25.68	23,934	11.31
Australian Capital Territory	120,875	22,136	1,448	6.65	7,857	36.11	1,863	8.56	10,593	48.68	375	1.72
Northern Territory	38,209	2,951	423	14.93	1,143	40.35	413	14.58	854	30.14	118	4.17
Total for Commonwealth	8,401,467	7,069,046	1,182,689	18.78	2,725,292	43.29	607,257	9.65	1,780,747	28.28	773,061	12.28
Two-song preferred					4,415,642	65.23			2,353,617	34.77		

== See also ==
- Referendums in Australia
