= 1997 Australian Constitutional Convention election =

- 3 November – 9 December 1997
- 76 of the 152 seats in the Constitutional Convention
- Turnout: 5,625,754 (46.92%)
Party	Vote %	Seats
Australian Republican Movement	30.5%	27
No Republic – ACM	22.5%	19
Ted Mack	4.0%	2
Clem Jones Team	3.4%	3
Real Republic	3.1%	2
Safeguard the People	2.7%	2
Australian Monarchist League	2.4%	3
Constitutional Monarchists	1.9%	2
Christian Democratic Party	1.5%	1
Elect the President	1.4%	1
A Just Republic	1.3%	2
Shooters Party	0.8%	1
Women for a Just Republic	0.7%	1
Queenslanders for a Republic	0.4%	1
Greens (NSW)	0.3%	1
Republic4U – The Youth Ticket	0.2%	1
ETHOS – Elect the Head of State	0.0%	1
Ungrouped	14.2%	6
This lists parties that won seats. See the complete results below.

The 1997 Australian Constitutional Convention election was held between 3 November and 9 December 1997 to elect 76 of the 152 members of the 1998 Australian Constitutional Convention, which took place from 2 to 13 February the following year.

The election was held via voluntary postal ballot, mailed to all enrolled voters between 3 and 14 November. It was modeled on elections to the Australian Senate and conducted via single transferable vote using group voting tickets. Short statements from candidates and groups, as well as unique identification numbers for each candidate, were included in the election package. Voters could number a single box above the line, either for a group ticket or an ungrouped candidate, and their preferences would be distributed according to the ticket their choice had lodged with the Australian Electoral Commission. Voters could also vote below the line by writing the unique identification numbers of candidates in a series of boxes below the line, and could fill in as many or as few as they wished.

A number of competing republican and monarchist groups ran, though only two were on the ballot in all states and territories: the Australian Republican Movement (ARM) and Australians for Constitutional Monarchy (ACM). They emerged as the two largest groups, winning 30.5% and 22.5% of first preferences nationwide, respectively. Minor groups and ungrouped candidates took the remainder of seats: 15 were won by smaller republican groups while monarchist groups took 7. The Fred Nile Group and Shooters Party won a seat each. In addition, six ungrouped candidates were elected.

Doone Kennedy (ACM, Tasmania) and Vilma Ward (ACM, Queensland) resigned as delegates prior to the Constitutional Convention. In accordance with the provisions of the election, they were replaced by the next unelected member of their respective group who was willing to fill the vacancy. Kennedy was replaced by Edward O'Farrell (6th on the ACM ticket) and Ward was replaced by Thomas Bradley (3rd on the ACM ticket).

== Australia ==
1997 Constitutional Convention election: National
Party	Primary vote	%	Seats
Australian Republican Movement	1,611,960	30.34	27
No Republic – ACM	1,195,627	22.51	19
Ted Mack	213,422	4.02	2
Clem Jones Queensland Constitutional Republic Team	182,464	3.43	3
Real Republic	162,223	3.05	2
Safeguard the People	143,420	2.70	2
Australian Monarchist League	115,894	2.18	2
Constitutional Monarchists	98,382	1.85	2
Christian Democratic Party (Fred Nile Group)	76,059	1.43	1
Elect the President	75,770	1.43	1
Alternative Three	74,231	1.40	0
A Just Republic	69,317	1.30	2
Shooters Party	43,513	0.82	1
Women for a Just Republic	38,303	0.72	1
The Women's Ticket – An Equal Say	35,718	0.67	0
Australian Greens – For A Republic	32,396	0.61	0
D.L.P – Democratic Labor Party	27,916	0.53	0
The Greens (WA)	26,478	0.50	0
Democracy First Group (DFG)	24,420	0.46	0
Australian Greens for a Just Republic	22,299	0.42	0
Queenslanders for a Republic	19,186	0.36	1
Australian Reform Party	18,536	0.35	0
Greens, Bill of Rights, Indigenous Peoples	16,935	0.32	1
Tasmanian Greens	15,037	0.28	0
A Voice for Regional Victoria	13,741	0.26	0
Develop Democracy in Australia	13,620	0.26	0
ACC Australians for Constitutional Choice	13,443	0.25	0
Community Republicans (Popular Election of President)	13,363	0.25	0
Presbyterian Church of Victoria	13,285	0.25	0
Voice of the Ordinary People	12,868	0.24	0
The Australian Monarchist League	12,724	0.24	1
Citizens for an Elected President	12,710	0.24	0
Australian Reconciliation	11,665	0.22	0
Republican Under God Promoting Family Values	11,279	0.21	0
Young Queensland's Voice	10,983	0.21	0
Australian Republican Movement (North Queensland)	9,588	0.18	0
Republic4U – The Youth Ticket	9,106	0.17	1
Independent Republican Queenslanders: Saunders and O'Dwyer	8,971	0.17	0
Godfrey Bigot's Traditional Family Values Party	8,667	0.16	0
ACT Greens	6,803	0.13	0
Presidential Democracy (People's Direct Election) Group	6,443	0.12	0
New Constitution for a New Millennium	5,156	0.10	0
Dunmore Lang College	5,114	0.10	0
Stable Independents	4,933	0.09	0
Christian Democratic Party – Australian Capital Territory	3,491	0.07	0
Community Republicans	2,952	0.06	0
Republicans for More than Minimalist Democracy	1,912	0.04	0
ETHOS – Elect the Head of State	1,786	0.03	1
"Alternative Three"	1,527	0.03	0
Ungrouped	756,929	14.25	6
Total	5,312,565	100.00	76
Invalid/blank votes	118,265	2.18	–
Rejected/other	194,924	–	–
Turnout	5,625,754	46.92	–
Registered voters	11,989,682	–	–
Source: Australian Electoral Commission

== New South Wales ==
1997 Australian Constitutional Convention election (New South Wales)
- 3 November – 9 December 1997
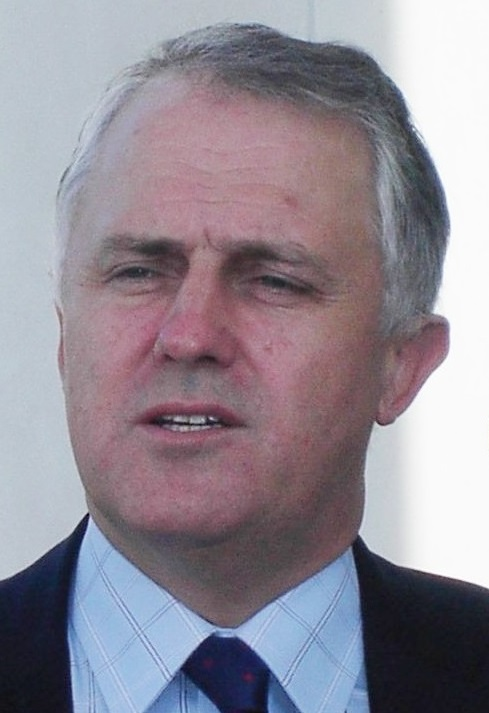

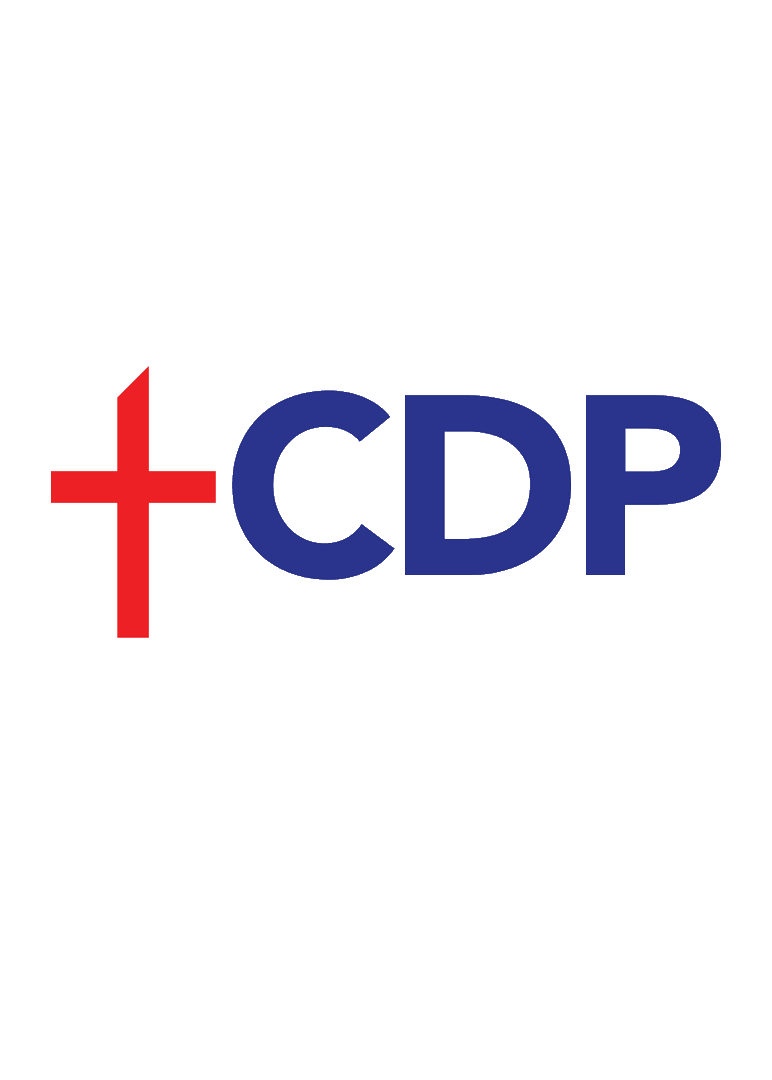
	First party	Second party
		ACM
Leader	Malcolm Turnbull	Doug Sutherland
Party	ARM	No Republic
Seats won	7	4
Popular vote	523,647	330,805
Percentage	31.41%	19.84
	Third party	Fourth party
	TM
Leader	Ted Mack	Alasdair Webster
Party	Ted Mack	CDP
Seats won	2	1
Popular vote	213,422	76,059
Percentage	12.80%	4.56%
	Fifth party	Sixth party
	AJR	AML
Leader	Pat O'Shane	Alf Garland
Party	A Just Republic	AML
Seats won	1	1
Popular vote	55,077	54,878
Percentage	3.30%	3.29%

#	Delegate	Party
1	Malcolm Turnbull	ARM
2	Doug Sutherland	ACM
3	Ted Mack	Ted Mack
4	Wendy Machin	ARM
5	Kerry Jones	ACM
6	Ed Haber	Ted Mack
7	Neville Wran	ARM
8	Julian Leeser	ACM
9	Karin Sowada	ARM
10	Peter Grogan	ARM
11	Jennie George	ARM
12	Christine Ferguson	ACM
13	Alasdair Webster	CDP
14	Glenda Hewitt	ICAAF
15	Pat O'Shane	A Just Republic
16	Alf Garland	AML
17	Andrew Gunter	ETHOS
18	Hazel Hawke	ARM
19	Jason Yat-Sen Li	Multi-Cultural
20	Catherine Moore	Greens

New South Wales results
Party	Candidate	Votes	%
Quota		79,392	
Australian Republican Movement	1. Malcolm Turnbull (elected 1); 2. Wendy Machin (elected 4); 3. Neville Wran (elected 7); 4. Karin Sowada (elected 9); 5. Peter Grogan (elected 10); 6. Jennie George (elected 11); 7. Roger Allen; 8. Helen Irving; 9. Thomas Keneally; 10. Gladys Berejiklian; 11. Stephen Crowe; 12. Hazel Hawke (elected 18); 13. Lex Marinos; 14. Judith Isobel Sutton; 15. Paolo Totaro; 16. Patricia Moran; 17. Shaoquett Moselmane; 18. Rose Kelly; 19. Jason Falinski; 20. Rania Wannous	523,647	31.41
No Republic – ACM	1. Doug Sutherland (elected 2); 2. Kerry Jones (elected 5); 3. Julian Leeser (elected 8); 4. Christine Ferguson (elected 12); 5. David Flint; 6. Godfrey Priest; 7. Abraham Constantin; 8. Amy McGrath; 9. Natasha Maclaren; 10. Jeffrey Phillips; 11. Patricia Feodosiu; 12. Trish Gibbons; 13. Garth Leggatt; 14. Suzanne Burton; 15. Arthur Tane; 16. Rosemary Colman; 17. Christine Clyne; 18. Nathan Zamprogno; 19. Malcolm Brooks; 20. Piroska Sadler	330,805	19.84
Ted Mack	1. Ted Mack (elected 3); 2. Ed Haber (elected 6)	213,422	12.80
Christian Democratic Party (Fred Nile Group)	1. Alasdair Webster (elected 13); 2. Graham McLennan	76,059	4.56
A Just Republic	1. Pat O'Shane (elected 15); 2. John Maitland; 3. Patrick Thompson; 4. Ben Slade; 5. Sally McManus; 6. Dorothy McRae-McMahon; 7. Lee Silva	55,077	3.30
Australian Monarchist League	1. Alf Garland (elected 16); 2. Beryl Evans; 3. Stewart Hespe; 4. Pat Woodley; 5. Simon Barrington; 6. T S Egan	54,878	3.29
Democracy First Group (DFG)	1. Jim Bain; 2. David Hodgkinson; 3. Ian Macintosh; 4. Mike Hudson; 5. Paul Simons	24,420	1.46
Alternative Three	1. Joe Bryant; 2. Laura Lillian McKenzie; 3. Gerard Mackney; 4. Peter Archer; 5. Warwick Schneider; 6. Laurence Hagerty; 7. Jim Cassidy; 8. James Cassidy; 9. Lex Stewart	21,695	1.30
Greens, Bill of Rights, Indigenous Peoples	1. Catherine Moore (elected 20); 2. Peter Breen; 3. David Pross; 4. Sandra Mercado; 5. Lenore Parker	16,935	1.02
Women for a Just Republic	1. Darelle Duncan; 2. Alice Mantel	14,793	0.89
Elect the President	1. William Hannan; 2. Patricia van den Hout; 3. Roger Cameron; 4. William Jacka; 5. Luke Hannan; 6. Benjamin Dobbin; 7. Liam Hannan; 8. Christopher Curran; 9. Paul Watkins; 10. Alicia Hannan; 11. Geoffrey Hannan; 12. Georgia Hannan; 13. Julian Kwan; 14. Matthew Hayson; 15. Warwick Short	12,923	0.78
Voice of the Ordinary People	1. Amelia Gavagnin Newman; 2. Greg Butler	12,868	0.77
Citizens for an Elected President	1. James Rush; 2. Laurence Ryan	12,710	0.76
Australian Reconciliation	1. Linda Burney; 2. Aden Ridgeway; 3. Wendy McCarthy; 4. Frank Brennan	11,665	0.70
Godfrey Bigot's Traditional Family Values Party	1. Godfrey Bigot; 2. Jon Kennedy	8,667	0.52
Community Republicans (Popular Election of President)	1. Peter Consandine; 2. Connie Katelaris; 3. Neil Gilchrist; 4. Elizabeth Crennan; 5. Brian Buckley	7,976	0.48
Dunmore Lang College	1. Prudence Allan; 2. Hayes Montgomery	5,114	0.31
Stable Independents	1. Warwick Howard; 2. Pauline O'Neill; 3. Charles Martin	4,933	0.30
Republicans for More than Minimalist Democracy	1. Rob Knell; 2. Bob Croucher	1,912	0.11
ETHOS - Elect the Head of State	1. Andrew Gunter (elected 17); 2. Veronique Marchandeau	1,786	0.11
Ungrouped	Jason Yat-Sen Li (elected 19)	21,940	1.32
Ungrouped	Brian Robert Davis	20,898	1.25
Ungrouped	Jim Cameron	17,589	1.05
Ungrouped	Glenda Hewitt (elected 14)	14,405	0.86
Ungrouped	Robin Banks	10,308	0.62
Ungrouped	Merv Cross	9,300	0.56
Ungrouped	Bob Ellis	8,812	0.53
Ungrouped	Bruce D Shepherd	8,672	0.52
Ungrouped	Steve Nichols	8,396	0.50
Ungrouped	48 other candidates below 0.5%	134,611	8.07
Ungrouped	Total	254,931	15.29
Total formal votes		1,667,216	100.00
Informal votes		37,646	2.21
Rejected/other		88,007	
Turnout		1,792,859	44.91
Enrolment		3,992,007	

== Victoria ==
1997 Australian Constitutional Convention election (Victoria)
- 3 November – 9 December 1997
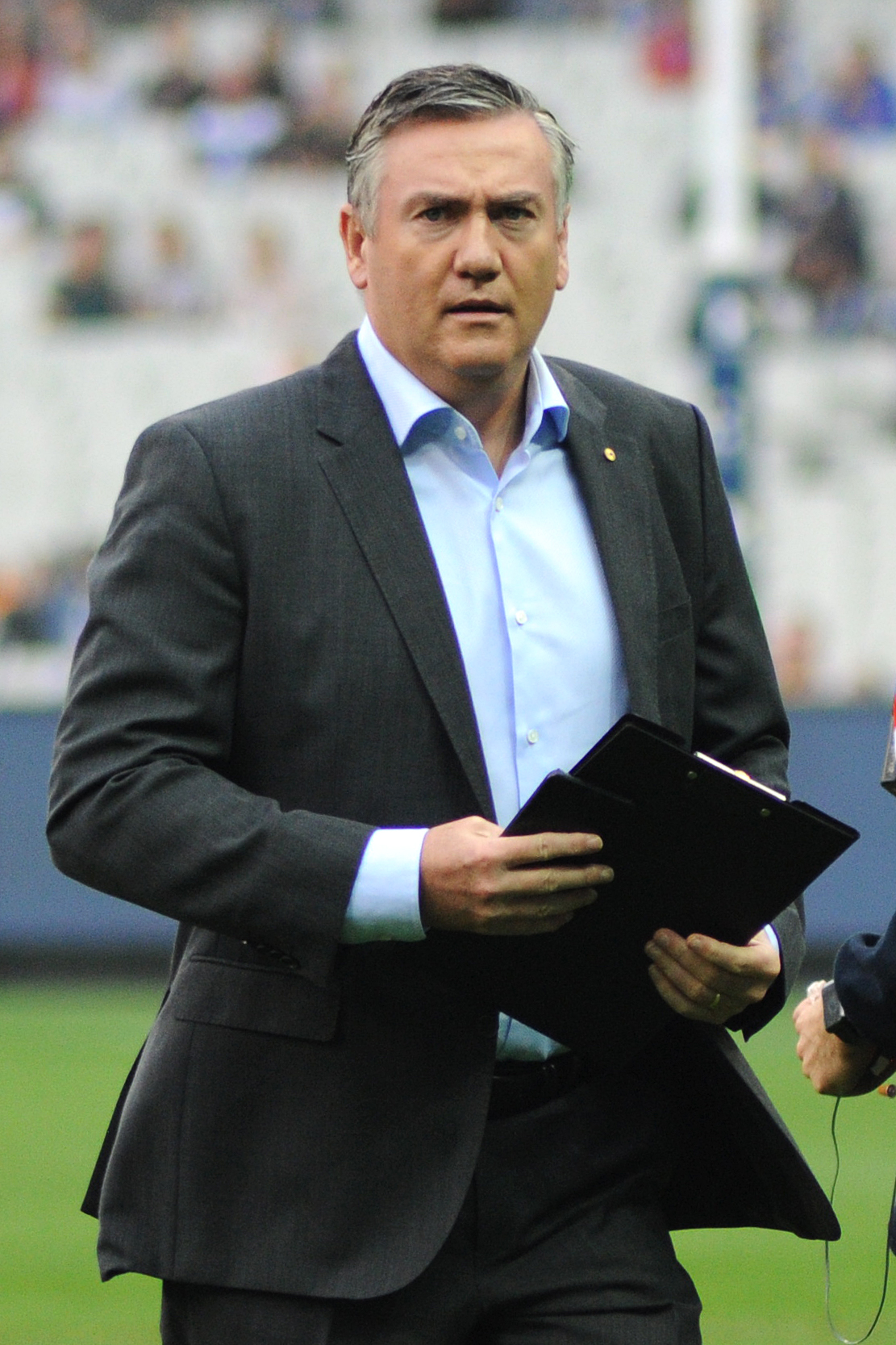

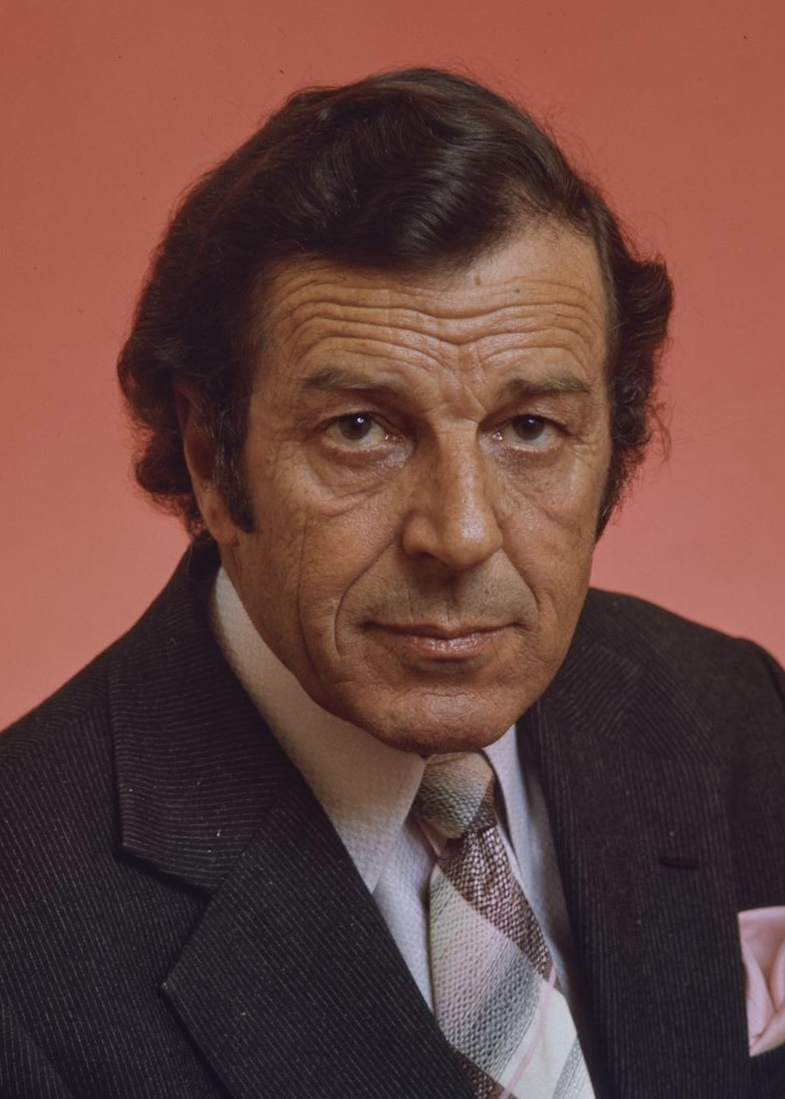

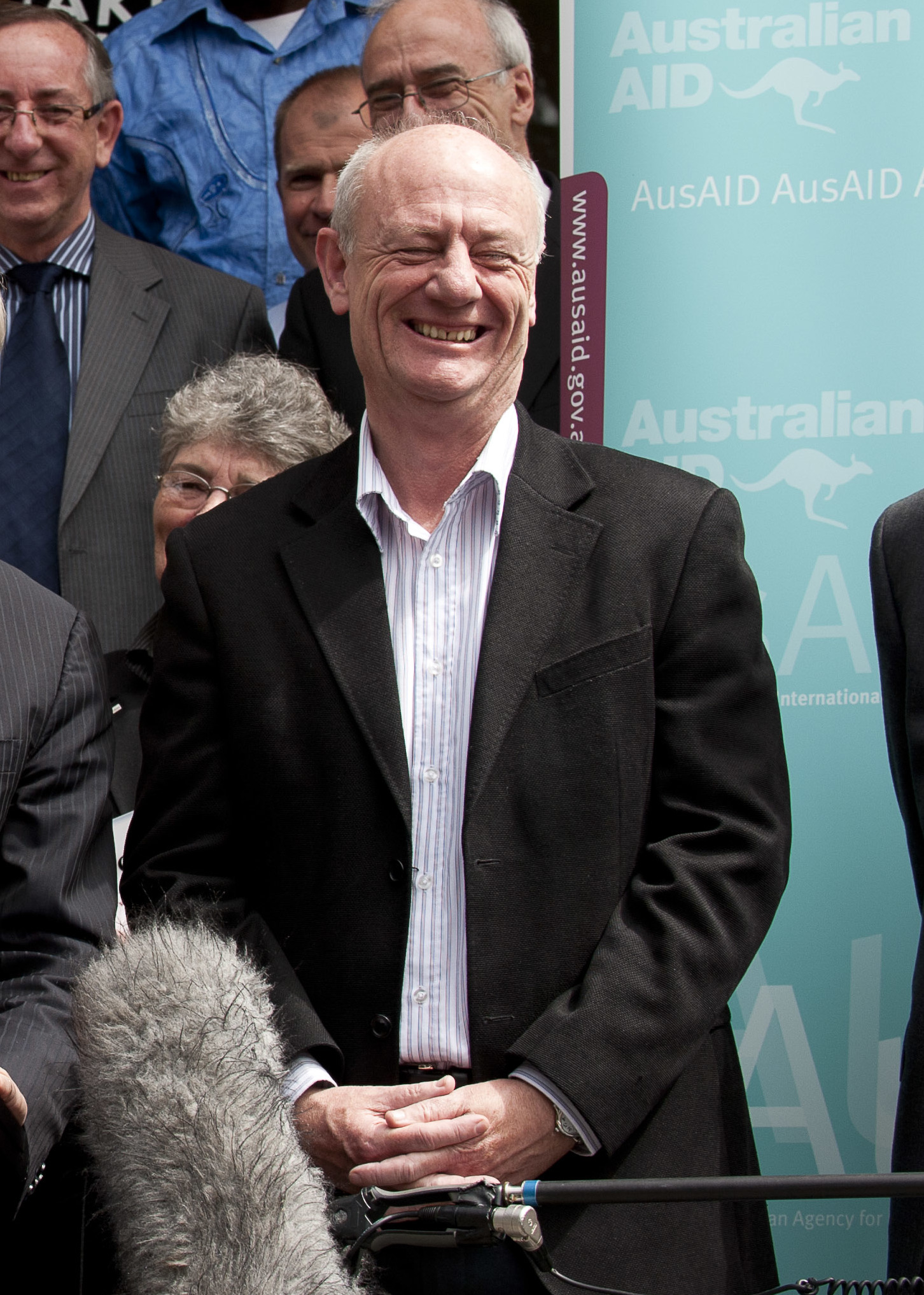
	First party	Second party
Leader	Eddie McGuire	Don Chipp
Party	ARM	No Republic
Seats won	5	3
Popular vote	443,243	246,722
Percentage	30.01%	16.71
	Third party	Fourth party
		STP
Leader	Tim Costello	Bruce Ruxton
Party	Real Republic	Safeguard the People
Seats won	2	2
Popular vote	162,223	12,724
Percentage	10.98%	8.23%
	Fifth party	Sixth party
	SP	AML
Leader	Eric Bullmore	Kenneth Gifford
Party	Shooters	AML
Seats won	1	1
Popular vote	43,513	40,672
Percentage	2.95%	2.75%

#	Delegate	Party
1	Eddie McGuire	ARM
2	Don Chipp	ACM
3	Tim Costello	Real Republic
4	Bruce Ruxton	Safeguard the People
5	Mary Delahunty	ARM
6	Sophie Panopoulos	ACM
7	Steve Vizard	ARM
8	Poppy King	ARM
9	Lindsay Fox	ARM
10	Vernon Wilcox	Safeguard the People
11	Moira Rayner	Real Republic
12	Misha Schubert	Republic4U
13	Jim Ramsay	ACM
14	Kenneth Gifford	AML
15	Phil Cleary	Ind. Australia
16	Eric Bullmore	Shooters

Victoria results
Party	Candidate	Votes	%
Quota		86,876	
Australian Republican Movement	1. Eddie McGuire (elected 1); 2. Mary Delahunty (elected 5); 3. Steve Vizard (elected 7); 4. Poppy King (elected 8); 5. Lindsay Fox (elected 9); 6. Jennifer Doran; 7. Rupert Hamer; 8. Mai Ho; 9. John Hirst; 10. Natalie Sykes; 11. Victor Borg; 12. Joseph O'Reilly; 13. Sally Mitchell; 14. Felicity Hampel; 15. Michael Long; 16. Sue Walpole	443,243	30.01
No Republic – ACM	1. Don Chipp (elected 2); 2. Sophie Panopoulos (elected 6); 3. Jim Ramsay (elected 13); 4. Colin Howard; 5. Peter Ross-Edwards; 6. Brett Hogan; 7. Wellington Lee; 8. Sally-Ann Venables; 9. Bruce Knox; 10. Judy McQueen; 11. Florence Parnaby; 12. Richard Welch; 13. Norma Leslie; 14. Paul Fitzgerald; 15. Victoria Knox; 16. Michael Gronow	246,722	16.71
Real Republic	1. Tim Costello (elected 3); 2. Moira Rayner (elected 11); 3. Jill Singer; 4. Davina Woods; 5. Nouria Salehi; 6. Michael Challen; 7. Judith Klepner; 8. Jude Wallace; 9. Jim Downey; 10. Rod Quantock; 11. Len Cooper; 12. Sid Spindler; 13. John Levi; 14. Mike Hill; 15. David Scott; 16. Mike Salvaris	162,223	10.98
Safeguard the People	1. Bruce Ruxton (elected 4); 2. Vernon Wilcox (elected 10); 3. Peter Vlahos; 4. Fred Flanagan; 5. Max O'Halloran; 6. Neville Clark	143,420	9.71
Shooters Party	1. Eric Bullmore (elected 16); 2. Neville Sayers; 3. Graham Eames; 4. Alan Hutchison	43,513	2.95
Australian Monarchist League	1. Kenneth Gifford (elected 14); 2. Steve Raskovy; 3. Paul Webster; 4. Gilbert Boffa; 5. John Carroll	40,672	2.75
The Women's Ticket – An Equal Say	1. Eve Mahlab; 2. Kim Rubenstein; 3. Helen Symon; 4. Ann Morrow; 5. Fay Marles; 6. Leigh Mackay	35,718	2.42
Australian Greens – For A Republic	1. Charmaine Clarke; 2. Peter Singer; 3. David Risstrom; 4. Gurm Sekhon; 5. Susan Pennicuik	32,396	2.19
D.L.P. – Democratic Labor Party	1. John Mulholland; 2. Pat Crea	27,916	1.89
Australian Reform Party	1. Ted Drane; 2. Raymond Mathieson; 3. William Wallace; 4. Alfred Thorpe	18,536	1.26
A Voice for Regional Victoria	1. Anthony Aitken; 2. Michael Crutchfield	13,741	0.93
Presbyterian Church of Victoria	1. Allan Harman; 2. Keith Bell	13,285	0.90
Republic Under God Promoting Family Values	1. John Murray; 2. Roger Holland	11,279	0.76
Republic4U – The Youth Ticket	1. Misha Schubert (elected 12); 2. Tom Wild; 3. Maddy Chiam; 4. Emma Cater; 5. Natalee Ward; 6. Mina Guli	9,106	0.62
Presidential Democracy (People's Direct Election) Group	1. Thomas Egan; 2. Gensheng Shen	6,443	0.44
New Constitution for a New Millennium	1. Joseph Toscano; 2. Stephen Reghenzani	5,156	0.35
Community Republicans	1. Peter Ellyard; 2. Tim Horan	2,952	0.20
Ungrouped
Ungrouped	Phil Cleary (elected 15)	44,431	3.01
Ungrouped	Andrew Bell	19,516	1.32
Ungrouped	Russell Standish	10,896	0.74
Ungrouped	Robert De Marinis	11,080	0.75
Ungrouped	Ka Sing Chua	9,588	0.65
Ungrouped	John Stone	7,769	0.53
Ungrouped	34 other candidates below 0.5%	97,483	6.60
Ungrouped	Total	200,763	13.59
Total formal votes		1,476,864	100.00
Informal votes		46,758	3.07
Rejected/other		43,042	
Turnout		1,566,664	51.75
Enrolment		3,027,571	

== Queensland ==
1997 Australian Constitutional Convention election (Queensland)
- 3 November – 9 December 1997
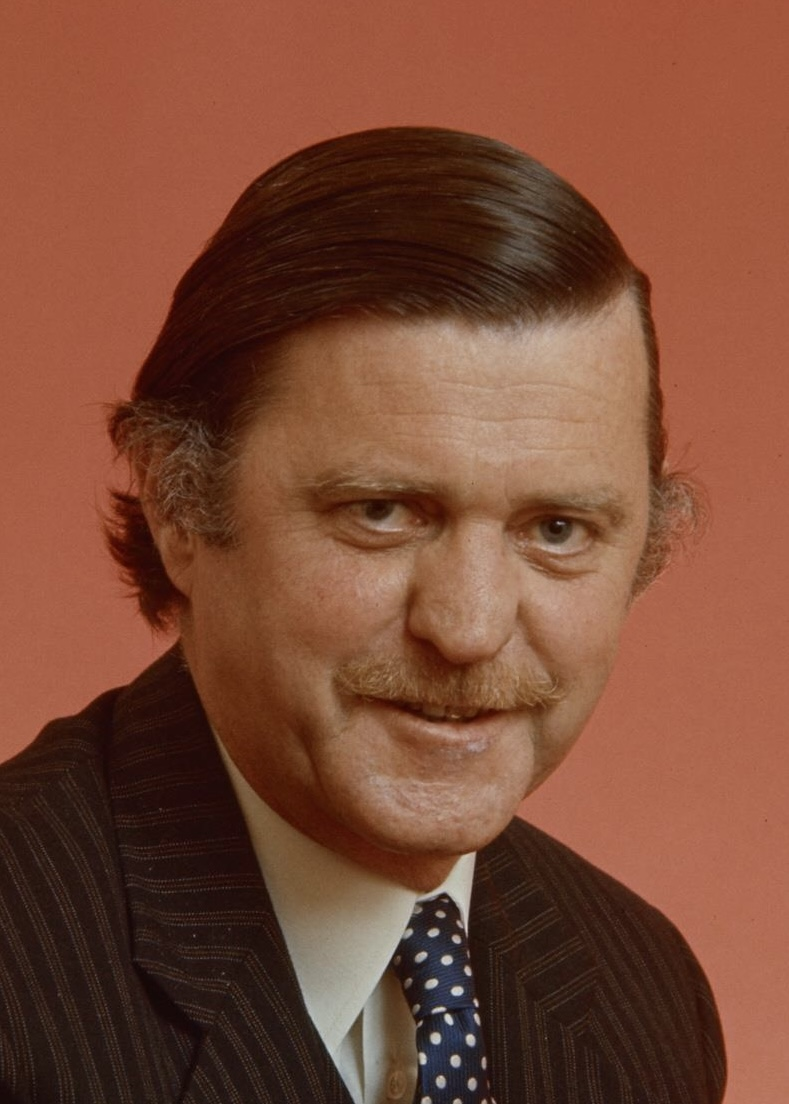

	First party	Second party
		ARM
Leader	James Killen	Michael Lavarch
Party	No Republic	ARM
Seats won	3	3
Popular vote	220,072	185,621
Percentage	23.34%	19.68%
	Third party	Fourth party
		CM
Leader	Clem Jones	Glen Sheil
Party	Clem Jones Team	Const. Monarchists
Seats won	3	2
Popular vote	182,464	98,382
Percentage	19.35%	10.43%
	Fifth party	Sixth party
	WFJR
Leader	Mary Kelly	Libby Connors
Party	Women for Just Republic	Greens
Seats won	1	0
Popular vote	23,510	22,299
Percentage	2.49%	2.36%

#	Delegate	Party
1	James Killen	ACM
2	Clem Jones	Clem Jones Team
3	Michael Lavarch	ARM
4	Glen Sheil	Const. Monarchists
5	Neville Bonner	ACM
6	David Muir	Clem Jones Team
7	Sallyanne Atkinson	ARM
8	Vilma Ward	ACM
9	Florence Bjelke-Petersen	Const. Monarchists
10	Mary Kelly	Women for Just Republic
11	Sarina Russo	ARM
12	Paul Tully	Qlders for Republic
13	Ann Bunnell	Clem Jones Team

The ACM, ARM and Clem Jones Team all won three delegates in Queensland. The ARM chose to run three tickets − a main statewide ticket, along with one for North Queensland and one for Central Queensland.

Former senator Florence Bjelke-Petersen, businessperson Sarina Russo and Ipswich councillor Paul Tully were among the delegates elected.

Future politicians Clive Palmer, Len Harris and Paul Hoolihan were among the unsuccessful candidates.

Party	Candidate	Votes	%	±%
Quota		67,361		
No Republic – ACM	1. James Killen (elected 1); 2. Neville Bonner (elected 5); 3. Vilma Ward (elected 8); 4. Thomas Bradley; 5. Megan Common; 6. Lindsay Allan; 7. Sonja Doyle; 8. Bob Galley; 9. Spero Dragona; 10. Alex Drake; 11. Helen Carrell; 12. Barbara Greenwood; 13. Louis Peter Rossi	220,072	23.34	
Australian Republican Movement	1. Michael Lavarch (elected 3); 2. Sallyanne Atkinson (elected 7); 3. Sarina Russo (elected 11); 4. Paul Everingham; 5. Jackie Huggins; 6. Michael Macklin; 7. C. L. Chiou; 8. Grace Grace; 9. Rodney Kendall; 10. Roslyn Atkinson; 11. Ray Barraclough; 12. Gerry Fowler; 13. Xandra Flach	185,621	19.68	
Clem Jones Queensland Constitutional Republic Team	1. Clem Jones (elected 2); 2. David Muir (elected 6); 3. Ann Bunnell (elected 13); 4. Ian Brusasco; 5. Lorraine Paul; 6. Paul V. Bell; 7. Doug Tucker; 8. Peter Johnstone; 9. Graham Andrews	182,464	19.35	
Constitutional Monarchists	1. Glen Sheil (elected 4); 2. Florence Bjelke-Petersen (elected 9); 3. Noel Wallis; 4. George Helon; 5. Michael Darby	98,382	10.43	
Women for a Just Republic	1. Mary Kelly (elected 10); 2. Pauline Woodbridge; 3. Jenny Hughey	23,510	2.49	
Greens for a Just Republic	1. Libby Connors; 2. Greg George; 3. Alexandra Guild	22,299	2.36	
Queenslanders for a Republic	1. Paul Tully (elected 12); 2. Peter Falvey; 3. Mai Nguyen; 4. Asia Ester Byatt; 5. Joanie Woods; 6. Rick Williams	19,186	2.03	
Alternative Three	1. Brian Sheehy; 2. Cynthia Mayne; 3. Bernie Baker; 4. Jean Evans; 5. Reg Bishop; 6. Joe Ostrenski; 7. Shirley Osborne; 8. Cec Clark; 9. Brian McDermott; 10. Stephen Sheehan; 11. Tony Pitt; 12. Jay Nauss; 13. Peter Boyle	16,707	1.77	
Elect the President	1. Clive Palmer; 2. Harold Charles Fong; 3. Clive Mensink; 4. Don Bailey; 5. Chris Toogood; 6. Andrew Topalov; 7. Anna Topalov; 8. Jean Mensink; 9. Susan Palmer; 10. Bronwyn Hall; 11. Alison Jack	16,025	1.70	
ACC Australians for Constitutional Choice	1. Robert Redden; 2. George Sterling	13,443	1.43	
Young Queensland's Voice	1. Garth Fallon; 2. David Lavercombe	10,983	1.16	
Australian Republican Movement (North Queensland)	1. Bernie Treston; 2. Terry Willshire; 3. Melissa George; 4. Bob Rossi	9,588	1.02	
Independent Republican Queenslanders	1. Kay Saunders; 2. Tim O'Dwyer	8,971	0.95	
Community Republicans (Popular Election of President)	1. Virginia Hall; 2. Norman Johnston; 3. Stan Stokes	5,387	0.57	
Australians Loyal to Crown and Constitution	Rona Joyner	14,574	1.55	
Resurrect Christ in the Nation’s Heart	Peter B. West	7,260	0.77	
Non-Aligned. Christian. Lawyer	Peter Janssen	6,725	0.71	
Presbyterian Church of Queensland	Nicholas Aroney	5,686	0.60	
Retention of the Existing Constitution	Len Harris	4,486	0.48	
An Australian for Australia	Noel Andrew Payne	4,130	0.44	
Australian Head of State - No Politicians!	Ken Horrigan	4,123	0.44	
Julie Michael	Julie Wylie	4,116	0.44	
Independent Republican	Mike Evans	4,100	0.43	
Independent Standing for Simplicity and Commonsense	John D'Hooghe	3,192	0.34	
Working for the Interest of Nation	Xuan Thu Nguyen	3,172	0.34	
Australian Republican Movement (Central Queensland)	Paul Hoolihan	3,156	0.33	
One Land, Many Nations - Republic	Chris Monsour	2,815	0.30	
The People’s Informed Decision	Margaret Hockey	2,793	0.30	
Independent	James Kenneth Reid	2,704	0.29	
	Frank O'Dea	2,610	0.28	
Bill of Rights for Australia	Richard Carew	2,340	0.25	
Concerned Australian	Kyla Arentz	2,187	0.23	
	Tim J. Harrington	2,045	0.22	
Governor-General as Figurehead, Republic: Australian Traditions	Bear Stanley	2,037	0.22	
Don’t Forget Our Eureka Democratic Spirit	Max Dunstan	1,984	0.21	
	Joie Dwyer	1,909	0.20	
Best for Australia	Stephen G. Le Page	1,738	0.18	
Independent	James Wakefield	1,663	0.18	
For a Neutral Umpire	Graeme O. Morris	1,650	0.17	
Civic Responsibility	Russell James Leneham	1,526	0.16	
Independent	Charles Mollison	1,485	0.16	
	Diane Hungerford	1,430	0.15	
Represents Five Generations Born in Australia	Maurie Hee	1,411	0.15	
Wide Bay Republican	Bob Snowden	1,395	0.15	
Constitution Clarity for Coming Century	Ron Howatson	1,102	0.12	
Democratic Alternative: Elect a People’s President	Ross Garrad	925	0.10	
Pro-Republican	Neil Thorpe	877	0.09	
Independent Constitutionalist	Gilbert Keith Joyce	849	0.09	
	James C. Bell	795	0.08	
History, Life and Vision in Constitution	Peter John Martin	681	0.07	
Colin (Beo) Saltmere	Colin Saltmere	635	0.07	
Defining Democracy is Affirming Australia	Alistair Barros	369	0.04	
Total formal votes		943,047	98.09	
Informal votes		18,335	1.91	
Rejected ballots		25,354		
Turnout		986,736	45.15	
Registered electors		2,185,414		

== Western Australia ==
1997 Australian Constitutional Convention election (Western Australia)
- 3 November – 9 December 1997
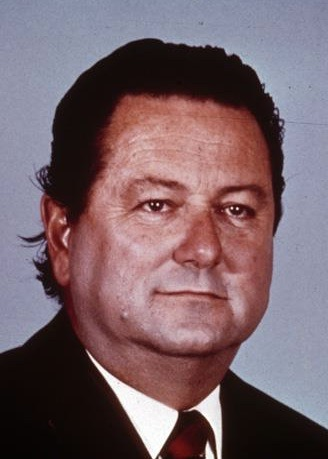

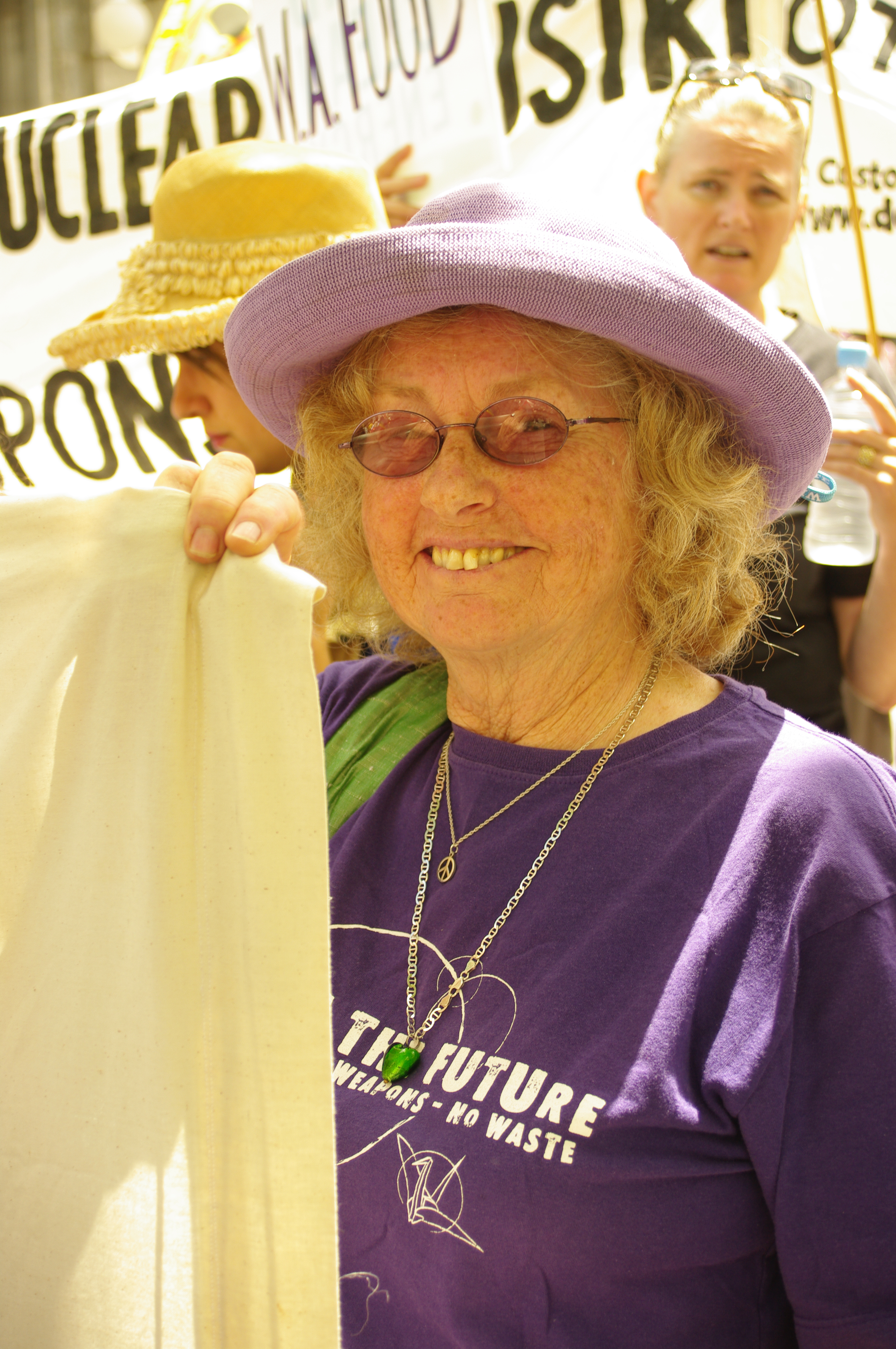
	First party	Second party
	ARM
Leader	Janet Holmes à Court	Reg Withers
Party	ARM	No Republic
Seats won	4	3
Popular vote	192,018	136,730
Percentage	40.98%	29.18%
	Third party	Fourth party
		AOM
Leader	Jo Vallentine	Liam Bartlett
Party	Greens	An Open Mind
Seats won	0	1
Popular vote	26,478	25,425
Percentage	5.65%	5.43%

In Western Australia, the ARM won the most delegates with four, while ACM won three. Elect the President ran two groups.

#	Delegate	Party
1	Janet Holmes à Court	ARM
2	Reg Withers	ACM
3	Peter Tannock	ARM
4	Geoff Hourn	ACM
5	Graham Edwards	ARM
6	Clare Thompson	ARM
7	Marylyn Rodgers	ACM
8	Liam Bartlett	An Open Mind
9	Patrick O'Brien	Elect the President

Party	Candidate	Votes	%	±%
Quota		46,856		
Australian Republican Movement	1. Janet Holmes à Court (elected 1); 2. Peter Tannock (elected 3); 3. Graham Edwards (elected 5); 4. Clare Thompson (elected 6); 5. Gary Mitchell; 6. James Verity; 7. Ben Playle; 8. Christina Gillgren; 9. Carolyn Tan	192,018	40.98	
No Republic – ACM	1. Reg Withers (elected 2); 2. Geoff Hourn (elected 4); 3. Marylyn Rodgers (elected 7); 4. Philip Kennedy; 5. David Magill; 6. Robert Isaacs; 7. Ken Murphy; 8. Tricia Gibson; 9. Grahame Coppin	136,730	29.18	
Greens	1. Jo Vallentine; 2. Robin Chapple	26,478	5.65	
An Open Mind for the Future	Liam Bartlett	25,425	5.43	
Elect the President	1. Patrick O'Brien (elected 9); 2. Martyn Webb; 3. Ron Manners; 4. Jonathan Harms; 5. Terry Pitsakis; 6. Veronica Cooke	14,594	3.11	
Develop Democracy in Australia	1. Ron Camp; 2. Ian Staines	13,620	2.91	
Western Australia First	Robert Reid	8,845	1.89	
Elect the President	1. Paul Andrews; 2. Ford Murray; 3. Audrey Bowran; 4. Penny Reiss; 5. Leonie Wright; 6. Ray Bacon; 7. Frank Slade	8,170	1.74	
War Veteran World War Two	Alan King	7,525	1.61	
Alternative Three	1. Mal Taylor; 2. Douglas Slater; 3. Gordon Williams; 4. John Jamieson; 5. Milton Evans; 6. Kathleen Taylor; 7. John Taylor	6,706	1.43	
Voice of Rural and Regional People	Ken Pech	4,184	0.89	
Independent for a Community Elected President	Christabel Chamarette	4,182	0.89	
Australians for a United Republic	Peter Webster	3,976	0.85	
Better Constitution, Australian Leader for Australia	Geoff Taylor	3,158	0.67	
	George Giudice	2,571	0.55	
Independent Political Economist, Ph.D	Phillip O'Hara	2,091	0.45	
Republican; Australian Constitutional Bill Of Rights	Brian Tennant	1,909	0.41	
	Rewi Lyall	1,761	0.38	
Bill of Rights for Australia	David Clyne	1,212	0.26	
	Peter McCumstie	866	0.18	
Independent Republican	Vincent Stackpole	778	0.17	
Independent You Elect President Republican	Bryan Lobascher	762	0.16	
Citizens Not Subjects	Colin McKerlie	647	0.14	
Australian Citizens for Annual General Elections	David Tehr	344	0.07	
Total formal votes		468,552	98.68	
Informal votes		6,269	1.32	
Rejected ballots		15,987		
Turnout		490,808	43.77	
Registered electors		1,121,254		

== South Australia ==
1997 Australian Constitutional Convention election (South Australia)
- 3 November – 9 December 1997
	First party	Second party
	ACM	ARM
Leader	Kym Bonython	Baden Teague
Party	No Republic	ARM
Seats won	4	4
Popular vote	180,489	163,962
Percentage	39.57%	35.95%

In South Australia, the ACM and ARM had four delegates elected each. Future premier Jay Weatherill was among the unsuccessful candidates.

#	Delegate	Party
1	Kym Bonython	ACM
2	Baden Teague	ARM
3	John Hepworth	ACM
4	Linda Kirk	ARM
5	Victoria Manetta	ACM
6	Tony Cocchiaro	ARM
7	John Fleming	ACM
8	Kirsten Andrews	ARM

Party	Candidate	Votes	%	±%
Quota		50,678		
No Republic – ACM	1. Kym Bonython (elected 1); 2. John Hepworth (elected 3); 3. Victoria Manetta (elected 5); 4. John Fleming (elected 7); 5. Ellis Wayland; 6. Mary Ann Stenberg; 7. Paul Rogers; 8. Okche Ashwin	180,489	39.57	
Australian Republican Movement	1. Baden Teague (elected 2); 2. Linda Kirk (elected 4); 3. Tony Cocchiaro (elected 6); 4. Kirsten Andrews (elected 8); 5. Tim Stanley; 6. Margaret Sexton; 7. Phil Sutton; 8. Maryann Bin-Sallik	163,962	35.95	
Australian Monarchist League	1. Raymond Hill; 2. Jens Peter Smith	20,344	4.46	
Lawyers for a Democratic Republic	Michael Abbott	15,072	3.30	
Employment, Education, Environment, Human Right$, Fir$T	Kathryn Gunn	14,719	3.23	
Elect the President	1. Martin Brewster; 2. Carla Ympa; 3. Liviu Mihov-Nicotodis; 4. Nicholas Proferes; 5. Mary Proferes; 6. Pam Brewster	12,267	2.69	
Alternative Three	1. John Sugars; 2. Cecile Aldersey; 3. James Diamentes	10,570	2.32	
Independent Republican Voice for S.A.	Robert Lawton	8,148	1.79	
A Voice for Australia's Future	Megan Boyle	5,670	1.24	
Your Country Representative	Jeff Mercer	5,104	1.12	
Bill of Rights for Australia	Jay Weatherill	4,056	0.89	
Australian Citizen	Heather Ceravolo	3,874	0.85	
Youth for Youth	Corina Bohn	3,553	0.78	
	Ted Byrt	3,089	0.68	
Universal Rites Equal Opportunity Shared Responsibility	Frank Verrall	2,957	0.65	
Multicultural Australia: Direct Democracy	Christo Stoyanoff	2,223	0.49	
Total formal votes		456,097	98.93	
Informal votes		4,910	1.07	
Rejected ballots		13,710		
Turnout		474,717	46.71	
Registered electors		1,016,336		

== Tasmania ==
1997 Australian Constitutional Convention election (Tasmania)
- 3 November – 9 December 1997
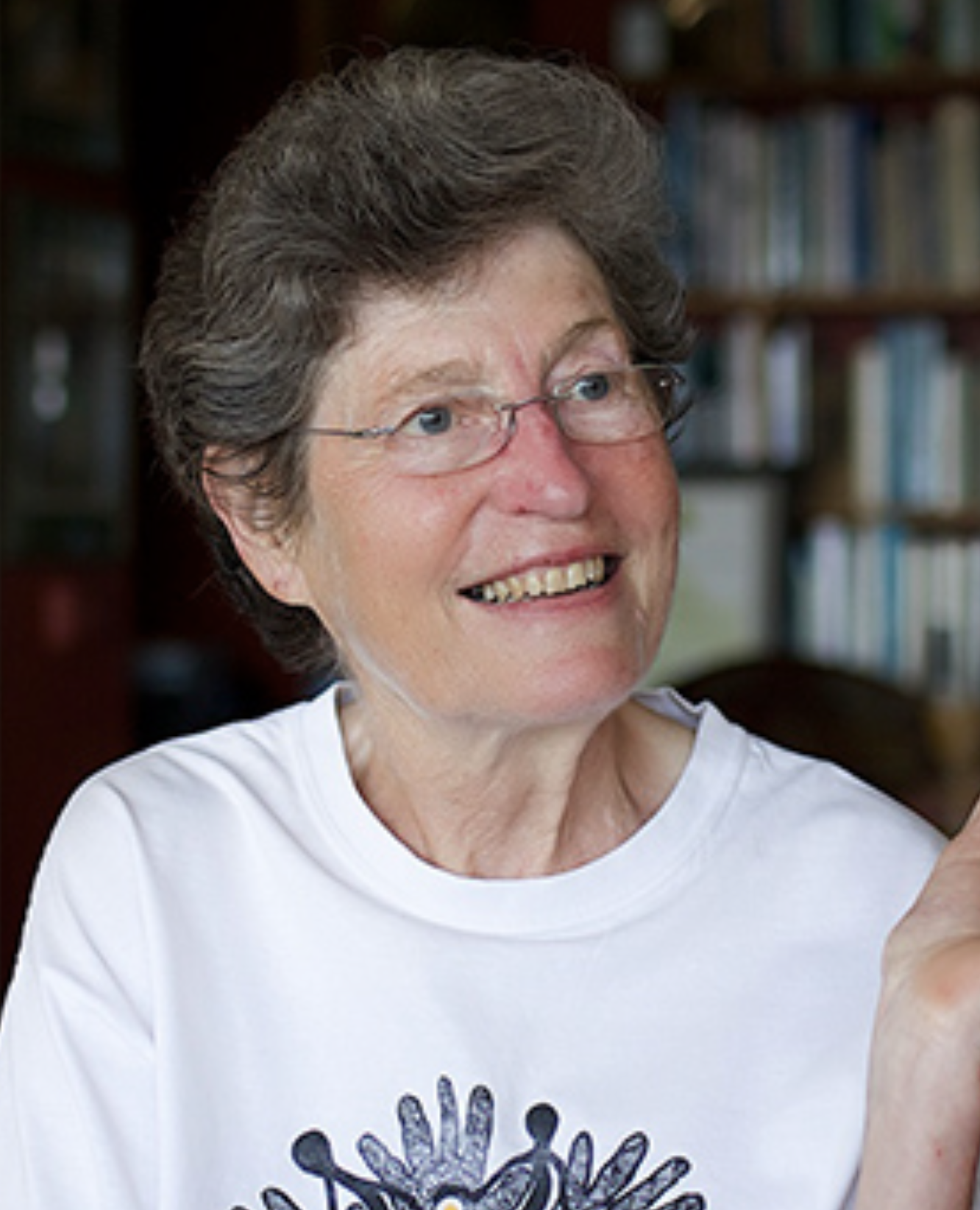
	First party	Second party
	ARM	ACM
Leader	Julian Ormond Green	Doone Kennedy
Party	ARM	No Republic
Seats won	2	2
Popular vote	47,463	45,439
Percentage	30.69%	29.38%
	Third party	Fourth party
		AML
Leader	Louise Crossley	Michael Kilgariff
Party	Greens	AML
Seats won	0	1
Popular vote	15,036	12,724
Percentage	9.72%	8.23%

#	Delegate	Party
1	Doone Kennedy	ACM
2	Julian Ormond Green	ARM
3	Michael Castle	ACM
4	Marguerite Scott	ARM
5	David Mitchell	AML
6	Eric Lockett	VOOFMTC

In Tasmania, the ACM and ARM elected two candidates each, while David Mitchell ran for the Australian Monarchist League and Eric Lockett ran as an ungrouped candidate for the Voice of Ordinary, Fair-Minded, Thinking Citizens (VOOFMTC) group.

Party	Candidate	Votes	%	±%
Quota		22,092		
Australian Republican Movement	1. Julian Ormond Green (elected 2); 2. Marguerite Scott (elected 4); 3. Peter Boyce; 4. Lynne Fitzgerald; 5. Noel Harrington; 6. Penny Cocker	47,463	30.69	
No Republic – ACM	1. Doone Kennedy (elected 1); 2. Michael Castle (elected 3); 3. Elspeth Hope-Johnstone; 4. Luke Maynard; 5. David Daintree; 6. Edward O'Farrell	45,439	29.38	
Greens	1. Louise Crossley; 2. John Wilson; 3. Paul O'Halloran	15,036	9.72	
Australian Monarchist League	1. David Mitchell (elected 5); 2. Simeon Duncan	12,724	8.23	
Voice of Ordinary, Fair-Minded, Thinking Citizens	Eric Lockett (elected 6)	12,265	7.93	
Alternative Three	1. Bob Campbell; 2. David Bissett; 3. Richard Gibbs	9,290	6.01	
Independent Republican	Michael Gaffney	8,543	5.52	
Australian National Flag Association	Reg Watson	3,878	2.51	
Total formal votes		154,639	98.47	
Informal votes		2,408	1.53	
Rejected ballots		4,338		
Turnout		161,385	48.81	
Registered electors		330,671		

== Territories ==
=== Australian Capital Territory ===
1997 Australian Constitutional Convention election (Australian Capital Territory)
- 3 November – 9 December 1997
	First party	Second party
	ARM	ACM
Leader	Anne Witheford	Alan Fitzgerald
Party	ARM	No Republic
Seats won	2	0
Popular vote	48,146	25,596
Percentage	45.16%	24.01%

#	Delegate	Party
1	Anne Witheford	ARM
2	Frank Cassidy	ARM

The ARM won both delegates in the Australian Capital Territory with 45% of the vote. Anne Witheford was the first delegate anywhere in Australia to have their election declared.

Party	Candidate	Votes	%	±%
Quota		35,542		
Australian Republican Movement	1. Anne Witheford (elected 1); 2. Frank Cassidy (elected 2)	48,146	45.16	
No Republic – ACM	1. Alan Fitzgerald; 2. Malcolm Mackerras	25,596	24.01	
Greens	1. Fiona Tito; 2. Shane Rattenbury	6,803	6.38	
A Just Republic	1. Geoff Dreschler; 2. David Matthews	6,455	6.05	
Independent	Robert Todd	4,595	4.31	
A Republic With Elected President	Alex Proudfoot	4,223	3.96	
Christian Democrats	1. Alex Cozadinos; 2. Terry Craig	3,491	3.27	
A Moderate Alternative	Martin Dunn	3,060	2.87	
Republic of the Free	John Molony	2,727	2.56	
Alternative Three	1. Andrew Rigg; 2. Barry Williams	1,527	1.43	
Total formal votes		106,623	98.87	
Informal votes		1,218	1.13	
Rejected ballots		2,833		
Turnout		110,674	52.31	
Registered electors		211,573		

=== Northern Territory ===
1997 Australian Constitutional Convention election (Northern Territory)
- 3 November – 9 December 1997
	First party	Second party
	ACM	ARM
Leader	Paul Rozenweig	Ian Fraser
Party	No Republic	ARM
Seats won	0	0
Popular vote	9,774	7,860
Percentage	24.73%	19.89%
	Third party	Fourth party
	AJR	TR
Leader	David Curtis	Michael Kilgariff
Party	A Just Republic	Territory Republican
Seats won	1	1
Popular vote	7,785	7,860
Percentage	19.70%	19.89%

#	Delegate	Party
1	David Curtis	A Just Republic
2	Michael Kilgariff	Territory Republican

In the Northern Territory, neither of the two groups with the highest vote (ACM and ARM) had a candidate elected, with David Curtis (A Just Republic) and Michael Kilgariff (Territory Republican) elected as delegates from third and fourth place respectively.

Party	Candidate	Votes	%	±%
Quota		13,176		
No Republic – ACM	1. Paul Rozenweig; 2. Melissa Purich	9,774	24.73	
Australian Republican Movement	1. Ian Fraser; 2. Christine Kerr	7,860	19.89	
A Just Republic	1. David Curtis (elected 1); 2. Susan Gilmour	7,785	19.70	
Territory Republican	Michael Kilgariff (elected 2)	5,434	13.75	
Republic With Minimal Constitutional Change	Fran Erlich	3,994	10.10	
	Steve Baldwin	2,027	5.13	
NT Regional Republican	Ray Wooldridge	1,379	3.49	
Alternative Three	1. Lynn O'Brien; 2. Peter Cole	1,274	3.22	
Total formal votes		39,527	98.18	
Informal votes		731	1.82	
Rejected ballots		1,653		
Turnout		41,911	39.97	
Registered electors		104,856		
