= 1998 Australian Constitutional Convention =

Constitutional convention in Australia

- Commonwealth Coat of Arms
- Genre: Constitutional convention
- Date: 2 February 1998 to 13 February 1998
- Venue: Old Parliament House, Canberra
- Delegates: 152—: 76 elected; 49 appointed by federal, state and territory parliaments; 36 appointed by the Commonwealth Government
- Co-chairs: Ian Sinclair (chairman); Barry Jones (deputy chairman)

The 1998 Australian Constitutional Convention, also known as the Con Con, was a constitutional convention which gathered at Old Parliament House, Canberra from 2 to 13 February 1998. It was called by the Howard government to discuss whether Australia should become a republic and if so, under which constitutional model. The Convention concluded that:

- Australia should, in principle, become a republic (89 delegates in favour, 52 against with 11 abstentions)
- in preference to the current monarchical constitutional arrangements, a republican form of government in which the head of state is a president endorsed by two-thirds of members at a joint sitting of the Commonwealth Parliament (the Bipartisan Appointment Model) be adopted (73 delegates in favour, 57 against with 22 abstentions)
- a constitutional referendum to adopt these changes be put to the people (133 delegates in favour, 17 against with 2 abstentions)

A referendum to adopt the republican model endorsed by the Convention was held in November 1999. The proposal was not adopted, with 55% of electors voting No and 45% voting Yes.

== Background ==
Australia was founded in 1901 as constitutional monarchy under the Australian Constitution adopted in 1901, with the duties of the head of state performed by a Governor-General selected by the Australian Prime Minister. Australian republicanism has existed since colonial times, though for much of the 20th century, the monarchy remained popular. In the early 1990s, republicanism became a significant political issue. Labor prime minister Paul Keating indicated a desire to instigate a republic in time for the centenary of federation in 2001. The opposition Liberal-National coalition, led by Alexander Downer, though less supportive of the republic plan, promised to convene a constitutional convention to discuss the issue. Under John Howard, the coalition won the 1996 federal election and set the convention date for February 1998.

== Composition ==
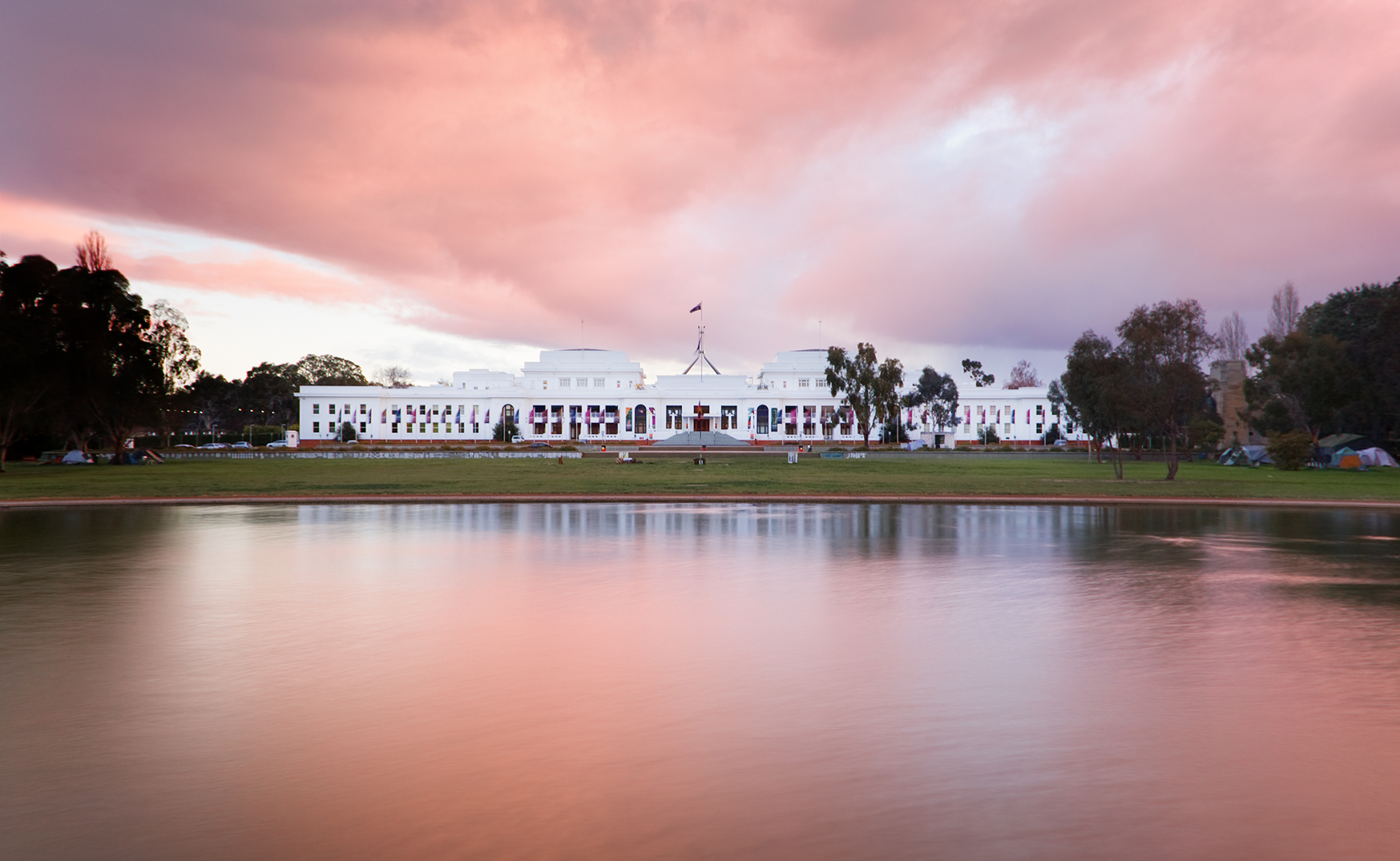
The convention took place at Old Parliament House, Canberra.

The convention comprised 152 delegates from all of the states and territories of Australia – half elected by a postal ballot and half appointed by the federal government. Of the appointees, 40 were representatives of the commonwealth, state and territory parliaments. Various pro-republican and pro-monarchy delegates were elected and various parliamentary and non-parliamentary delegates were appointed including state and territory leaders. The convention was chaired by the Right Honourable Ian Sinclair MP, of the National Party of Australia with the Honourable Barry Jones AO MP of the Australian Labor Party as deputy chairman.

=== Prominent advocates ===
==== Parliamentarians ====
Sitting members of the Liberal-National Party Coalition were permitted a free vote on the republican issue, while the Australian Labor Party (ALP) adopted the republican position as a matter of party policy. Senior Liberals split on the issue, with the Prime Minister, John Howard, supporting the status quo and the Treasurer, Peter Costello, supporting a republic. Other representatives of the government at the convention included the Attorney General, Daryl Williams, the Minister for the Environment, Robert Hill, and the Minister for Social Security, Jocelyn Newman, as well as the Deputy Prime Minister, Tim Fischer, and other Members of Parliament. The Leader of the Opposition, Kim Beazley, was accompanied by colleagues Gareth Evans, John Faulkner and others, while the Australian Democrats sent Senator Natasha Stott Despoja.

The states all sent three representatives including their premiers and opposition leaders, while the territories were represented by their chief ministers. Premiers Bob Carr (New South Wales), Jeff Kennett (Victoria), Rob Borbidge (Queensland), Richard Court (Western Australia), John Olsen (South Australia) and Tony Rundle (Tasmania) attended, along with chief ministers Kate Carnell (Australian Capital Territory) and Shane Stone (Northern Territory).

==== ARM and ACM ====
A number of members of the Australian Republican Movement (ARM) attended the convention. ARM was established in July 1991 and comprised distinguished Australian intellectuals, politicians and former politicians, business people, students and other citizens who supported an Australian republic. A number of Australian Labor Party supporters and members were attracted to the organisation, though its leader from 1993 to 2000 was future Liberal Prime Minister Malcolm Turnbull. Prominent delegates at the Convention included media personalities Steve Vizard and Eddie McGuire, businesswoman Janet Holmes à Court and businessman Lindsay Fox.

Australians for Constitutional Monarchy was established in 1992, after Prime Minister Keating announced his republican agenda. The organisation was called together to counter the republican movement by Justice Michael Kirby and like minded constitutional monarchists including Lloyd Waddy QC, Aboriginal statesman Neville Bonner, Chancellor of the University of Sydney Dame Leonie Kramer, Helen Sham-Ho (the first Chinese-born member of an Australian Parliament), Doug Sutherland (former Labor Lord Mayor of Sydney).

Later, former Labor leader and Governor General Bill Hayden joined the organisation and membership grew to more than 30,000 registered supporters nationwide. Justice Kirby argued that a constitutional monarchy is "a system of government for those committed to effective checks on rulers and to liberal democracy". Kirby resigned from the organisation upon being appointed a judge of the High Court of Australia and did not participate in the convention. ACM recruited Tony Abbott as its first full-time executive director, although his membership also ceased following pre-selection as a Liberal candidate for election to the Federal Parliament in March 1996. Kerry Jones was then appointed executive director of ACM in his place. She and Lloyd Waddy led ACM through the 1998 Constitutional Convention and the 1999 referendum. Don Chipp, founder of the Australian Democrats, was one of ACM's delegates at the convention.

==== Others ====
Smaller republican groupings included "A Just Republic", the "Real Republic" group, the Clem Jones "Queensland Constitutional Republic Team" and the Ted Mack group. Other monarchist groups included the "Constitutional Monarchists" group, the Australian Monarchist League and "Safeguard the People". Other minor Australian political parties with elected representatives included the Shooters Party, the Christian Democrats (Fred Nile Group). A number of individuals were elected under other grouping names, including lawyer Jason Yat-Sen Li ("A Multi-Cultural Voice") and Misha Schubert ("Republic4U – The Youth Ticket").

Six Indigenous delegates participated in the convention, including magistrate Pat O'Shane, who was vocal in support of a republic and monarchist Neville Bonner, Australia's first Aboriginal parliamentarian, who ended his contribution to the convention with a Jagera Tribal Sorry Chant in sadness at the deception practised by republicans. The Republican Model, as well as a proposal for a new Constitutional Preamble which would have included the "honouring" of Aboriginals and Torres Strait Islanders.

Lady Florence Bjelke-Petersen and Glen Sheil represented the group named "Constitutional Monarchists", while prominent Returned and Services League spokesman Bruce Ruxton represented the monarchist "Safeguard the People" group and Brigadier Alf Garland represented the Australian Monarchist League. Ted Mack and Phil Cleary were prominent independent republicans.

Clergy from the major churches were appointed as delegates: the Catholic Church in Australia's George Pell and the Anglican Church of Australia' s Peter Hollingworth; while republican Tim Costello, a prominent Baptist minister was elected as a representative for Victoria from the "Real Republic Group".

Other appointees included academics, such as historian Geoffrey Blainey and Sydney University chancellor Leonie Kramer; legal and constitutional experts such as law professor Greg Craven retired judge Richard McGarvie and public servant David Smith. Former Vice Regal office holders were also appointed, including former Governor of South Australia Dame Roma Mitchell and former Governor General Bill Hayden. Senior business appointees included Sir Arvi Parbo and Donald McGauchie. Journalist delegates included Mia Handshin and Miranda Devine.

== Debate and conclusions ==
The Convention debated the need for a change to the Constitution of Australia which would remove the monarchy from a role in Australian government and law. According to the final communiqué issued by the convention, three questions were considered:

Whether or not Australia should become a republic; which republic model should be put to the voters to consider against the current system of government; in what time frame and under what circumstances might any change be considered.

Delegates advocated a range of positions from no-change to minimal change to radical change. According to the final communique:

Three categories of model for a possible Australian republic were before the convention. They were: direct election, parliamentary election by a special majority, and appointment by a special council following prime ministerial nomination.

"In principle" agreement was reached by a majority of delegates for an Australian Republic (though a minority bloc of Monarchists dissented). Following a series of votes, a proposal for a "Bipartisan Appointment of the President Model" for an Australian republic was endorsed by a majority of delegates who voted for or against the motion (monarchists and some radical-change republicans abstained from the vote). According to hansard, the vote for the Bi-Partisan model was: "for" 73, "against" 57 with 22 abstentions.

The final communiqué recommended that Parliament establish a committee responsible for considering the nominations for the position of president and consult widely in the community and compile a shortlist for the Prime Minister. Taking into account the recommendations of the committee, the Prime Minister would then present a single nominee, seconded by the Opposition Leader to a joint sitting of the Australian Parliament which must gain a two-thirds majority in order to be endorsed. The president could be removed at any time by a notice in writing signed by the Prime Minister, however if the House of Representatives failed to ratify this dismissal, the president would be eligible for re-appointment. The powers of the president were to be those of the existing office of Governor General of Australia.

The Convention recommended that state parliaments also examine the issue of the republic, as each state has separate and individual constitutional links to the monarchy. Certain recommendations were made for a new Constitutional preamble which included introductory language along the lines of "we the Australian people", and referencing "Almighty God", custodianship and occupancy of Australia by Indigenous Australians; as well as affirmations of the law, cultural diversity, unique land and environment and democratic political system of Australia.

The new Australian republic was to retain the name Commonwealth of Australia.

The Convention recommended to the Prime Minister and Parliament of Australia that the model, and other related changes to the Constitution, supported by the convention, be put to the people in a constitutional referendum in 1999.

The minimalist McGarvie Model developed by former Governor of Victoria, Richard McGarvie, and originally submitted to the Republic Advisory Committee in 1993, was the second most popular model of the four voted upon. Republican delegates Clem Jones, Ted Mack, Pat O'Shane, Paul Tully and Paddy O'Brien held out for greater change to the Constitution than the more minimalist model ultimately proposed.

=== Arguments by key advocates ===
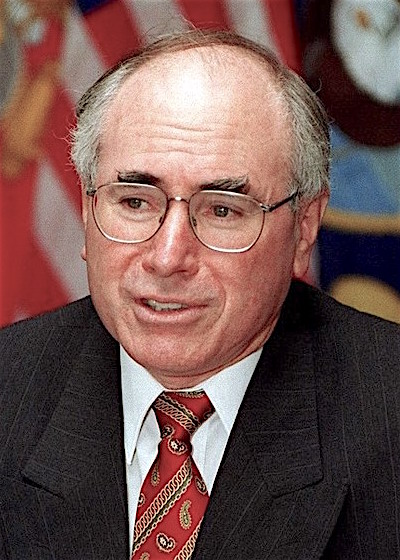
Prime Minister John Howard supported the constitutional monarchy. The Liberal-National Coalition permitted their members a free vote on the issue.

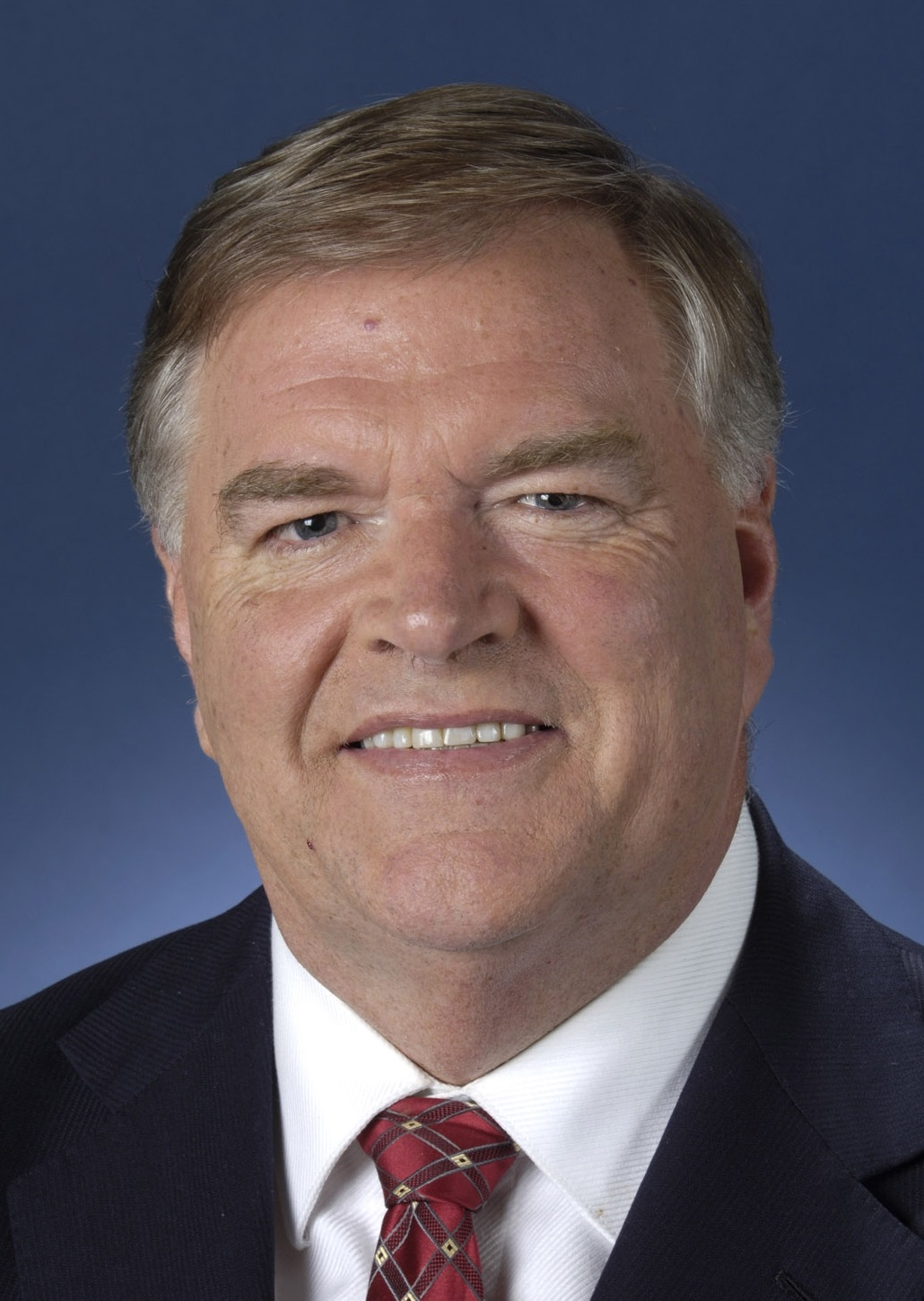
Opposition Leader Kim Beazley supported the republic. His Australian Labor Party adopted the republic as official party policy.

In his address to the opening session of the convention, Liberal Prime Minister John Howard outlined his support for retaining the status quo on the basis that it has provided a long period of stability and said he believed that the "separation of the ceremonial and executive functions of government" and the presence of a neutral "defender of constitutional integrity" was an advantage in government and that no republican model would be as effective in providing such an outcome as the Australian monarchy:

In my view, the only argument of substance in favour of an Australian republic is that the symbolism of Australia sharing its legal head of state with a number of other nations is no longer appropriate. As a matter of law, Elizabeth II is Queen of Australia. As a matter of indisputable constitutional convention, the Governor-General has become Australia's effective head of state.

It will ultimately be for the Australian people to resolve this theoretical conflict between our history and present day constitutional reality – to decide whether removing the symbolism which many see as inappropriate in our present arrangements – counts more than the stability and inherent strength of the existing order.

I oppose Australia becoming a republic because I do not believe that the alternatives so far canvassed will deliver a better system of government than the one we currently have. I go further – some will deliver a worse outcome and gravely weaken our system of government. I believe that modern government is most workable where the essentially ceremonial functions of government are separated from the day to day executive responsibilities.

— Prime Minister John Howard

The Deputy Prime Minister, Tim Fischer, of the National Party said that the Australian Constitution had delivered one of the "oldest continuous federated democracies in the world" and that changing it would be a complex operation:

The case for changing our mighty Constitution which has helped modernise Australia remains distant, divided and ill-defined. I say: stay with a system that works and works well.

— Deputy Prime Minister Tim Fischer

Opposition Leader Kim Beazley of the Australian Labor Party advocated "minimalist" change. He described transition to a republic as "unfinished business" for Australia and said that foreigners "find it strange and anachronistic, as many Australians now clearly do, that our Head of State is not an Australian". The ALP proposed appointment of a president by two-thirds majority of parliament. In his opening address, Beazley told the convention:

Our nation is a republic in all but name. We argue that we as a nation should recognise the reality of our small "r" republican arrangements by making the necessary adjustments to place the capping stone on that structure – a Head of State who is unambiguously Australian – a Head of State who is one of us.

— Opposition Leader Kim Beazley

Liberal Treasurer Peter Costello advocated for a republic. He rejected any suggestion that Australia was not already an independent nation and said that, while the Australian Constitution works "remarkably well", it was the institution of monarchy that was the crux of his argument for change:

It is commonly said that all this argument is about is whether we want an Australian as our head of state. If that were all we wanted, one of the options to fix it would be an Australian monarchy but, in truth, the problem is more the concept of monarchy itself. The temper of the times is democratic; we are uncomfortable with an office that appoints people by hereditary. In our society in our time we prefer appointment by merit.

— Treasurer Peter Costello

Pat O'Shane, a magistrate and indigenous woman expressed a desire for change based on what she perceived as historical injustice and present inadequacies within the Australian Constitution:

That modern Australia, the Australia that has developed since 26 January 1788 as distinct from the Australia of my ancestors, has a constitutional monarchy is a direct unambiguous consequence of our origins as a colony of Britain—a penal colony at that. As such, it was underwritten with the values of power, privilege, elitism, oppression and dispossession. It was blatantly exclusionary. It is no wonder then that the Australian Constitution, designed to institute a constitutional monarchy as the system of government in this country, is such an inadequate and uncertain instrument as it is.

— Magistrate Pat O'Shane

Indigenous delegates were divided, however. Former Senator Neville Bonner made an impassioned defence of the constitutional monarchy, describing efforts to change it as "senseless division" and a distraction from the real problems facing Australia:

You [non-indigenous Australians] came to my country. You invaded my land. You took our Earth (our everything). .... And then slowly you began to change ... You began to accept that my people had rights; that they were entitled to respect ...

We have come to accept your laws. We have come to accept your Constitution. We have come to accept the present system. We believed you when you said that a democracy must have checks and balances. We believed you when you said that not all positions in society should be put out for election. We believed you when you said that judges should be appointed, not elected. We believed you when you said that the Westminster system ensures that the government is accountable to the people. We believed you when you taught us that integral to the Westminster system is a head of state who is above politics. We believed you when you said that, as with the judiciary, Government House must also be a political-free zone. We believed you when you said that it is not important that the Crown has greater powers and that what was important was that the Crown denies those powers to the politicians ...

I cannot see the need for change. I cannot see how it will help my people. I cannot see how it will resolve the question of land and access to land that troubles us. I cannot see how it will ensure that indigenous people have access to the same opportunities that other Australians enjoy. Fellow Australians, what is most hurtful is that after all we have learned together, after subjugating us and then freeing us, once again you are telling us that you know better. How dare you?

— Neville Bonner

Kerry Jones, leader of Australians for Constitutional Monarchy defended the Australian Constitution, saying "no republic model will ever offer the protection and safeguards that work so well in our current Constitution". She said her task was to "assess each republican model against the Constitution that has served us so well":

I had become a constitutional monarchist—not out of my love of English blood, for my blood is actually Irish; not out of birth in the Protestant establishment, for I am actually a Catholic; not out of enthusiasm for all things royal, for I have little interest in such trivia. I had become a constitutional monarchist because I was persuaded, as was Michael Kirby, that the system of government bequeathed to us by our founders is superior to any republican models proposed.

— Kerry Jones, Australians for Constitutional Monarchy

Delegates examined various models for a republic. Independent republican delegate Phil Cleary argued the case for direct-election of a president and questioned the motivations of "conservative" republicans:

About the time of the last convention one of our greatest poets, Henry Lawson, claimed that Australians would doff their hat to no man and call no biped master. Now the best the conservative wing of the republican leadership can offer the people is an appointed president—a president palatable to the major parties. Their justification is pure scaremongering ... What are they frightened of? Do they fear a creative tension in the political system, or is it more that they fear giving up their power or their loss of influence?

— Phil Cleary

Malcolm Turnbull, leader of the Australian Republican Movement, cautioned against mixing the roles of President and Prime Minister in a direct election system, telling the convention:

Mr Clem Jones has proposed a directly elected model that would give the president additional powers. We believe that is not a good option. We feel that a directly elected president should either have no powers—for example, as in Ireland—or be the chief executive of the nation, as in the case of the United States. We think the French arrangement, where executive power is shared in a very confused fashion between the President and the Prime Minister, is the worst of all options. So I would say that we either go to Dublin for a directly elected president or we go to Washington; the Paris option, for the reasons advanced by Mr (Bob) Carr, is not on.

— Malcolm Turnbull, Australian Republican Movement

The Catholic Archbishop of Melbourne, George Pell, supported change, but noted "Without support from most of the front benches of both sides of the parliament, it would be wasteful to go to a referendum." Towards the end of proceedings, he called on conservatives to support change:

All conservatives here should realise that they will never get a better result out of a convention than they have done here. It will certainly be no less difficult for a tyrant to abuse the office of Prime Minister or president. That is fundamental; we all agree. The preamble has been voided of legal significance, the reserve powers are retained and, with partial codification, this will in practice make them stronger because they will become less unpredictable and less offensive.

— George Pell, Archbishop of Melbourne

== Aftermath ==
Two proposals to amend the Australian Constitution were submitted to the Australian electorate in November 1999. If approved, the referendum would have established a republican system of government in Australia. The referendum held on 6 November 1999 failed to achieve the support of either a majority of voters or a majority of states. The national vote of the electors in favour of Australia becoming a republic was 45.13%, with 54.87% against. Australia remains a constitutional monarchy.

== Delegates ==
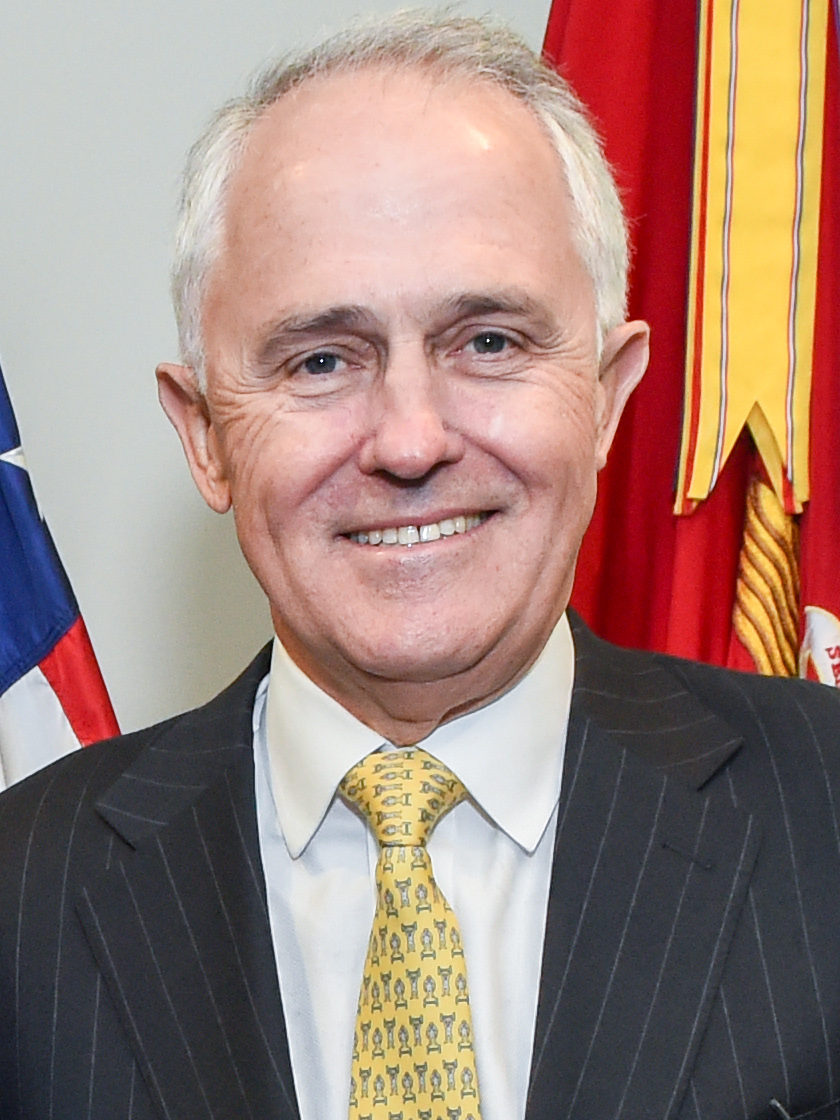
Malcolm Turnbull led the Australian Republican Movement

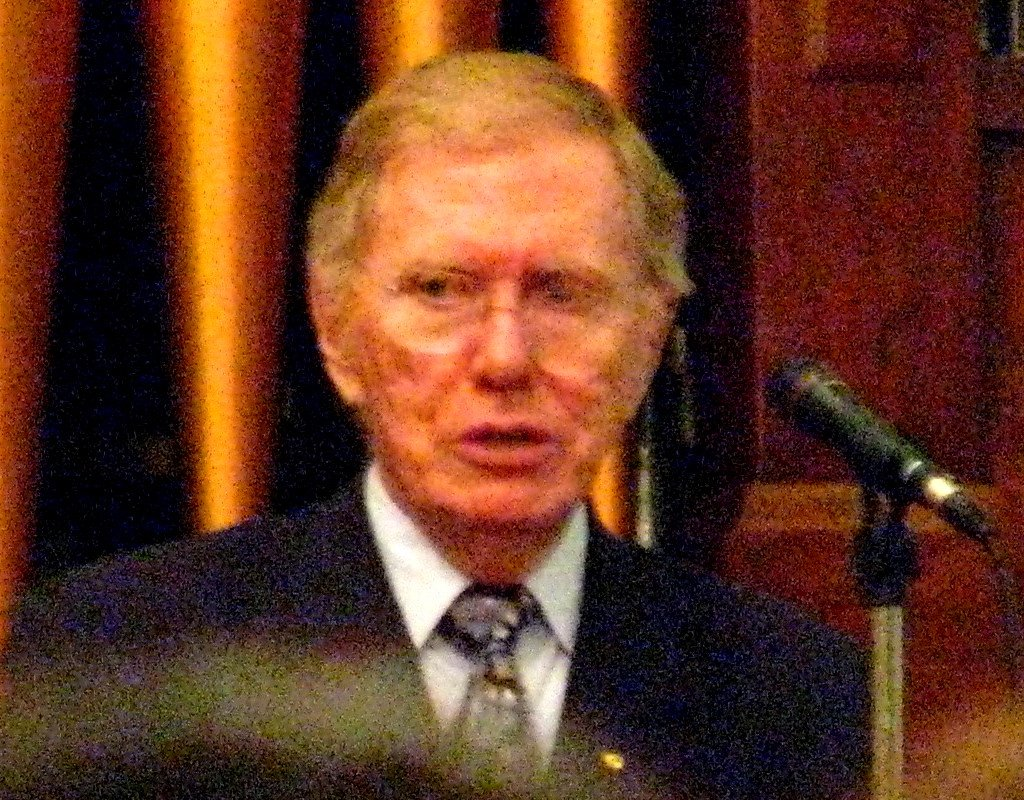
Justice Michael Kirby founded Australians for Constitutional Monarchy —though he retired from the organisation prior to the Convention following his appointment as a judge of the High Court of Australia

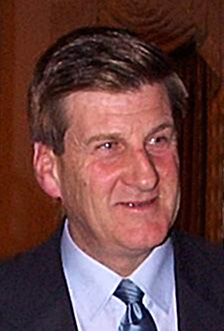
Liberal Premier of Victoria Jeff Kennett (republican) attended as an appointed delegate along with all the State and Territory leaders and State opposition leaders

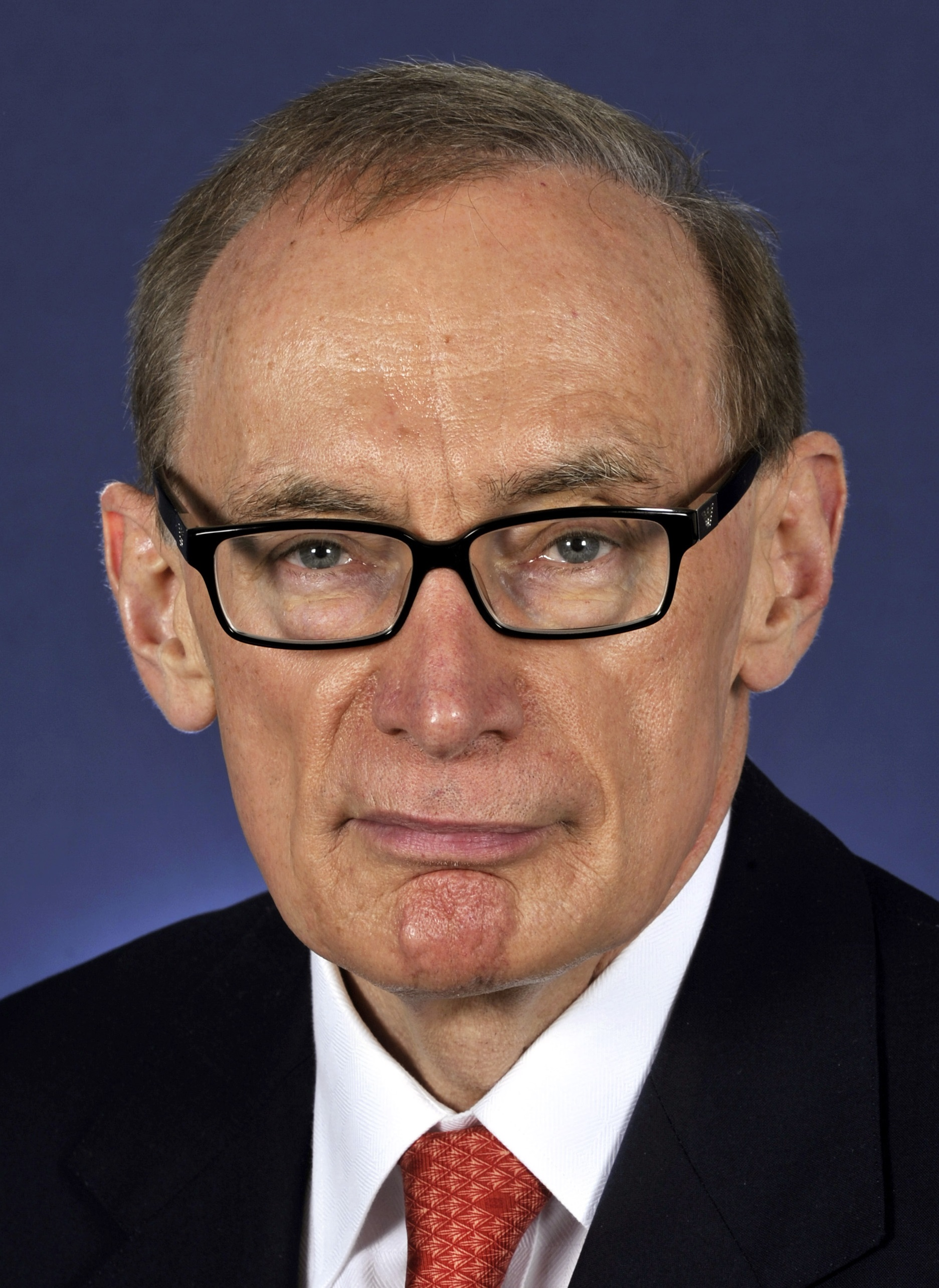
Labor Premier of New South Wales Bob Carr (republican)

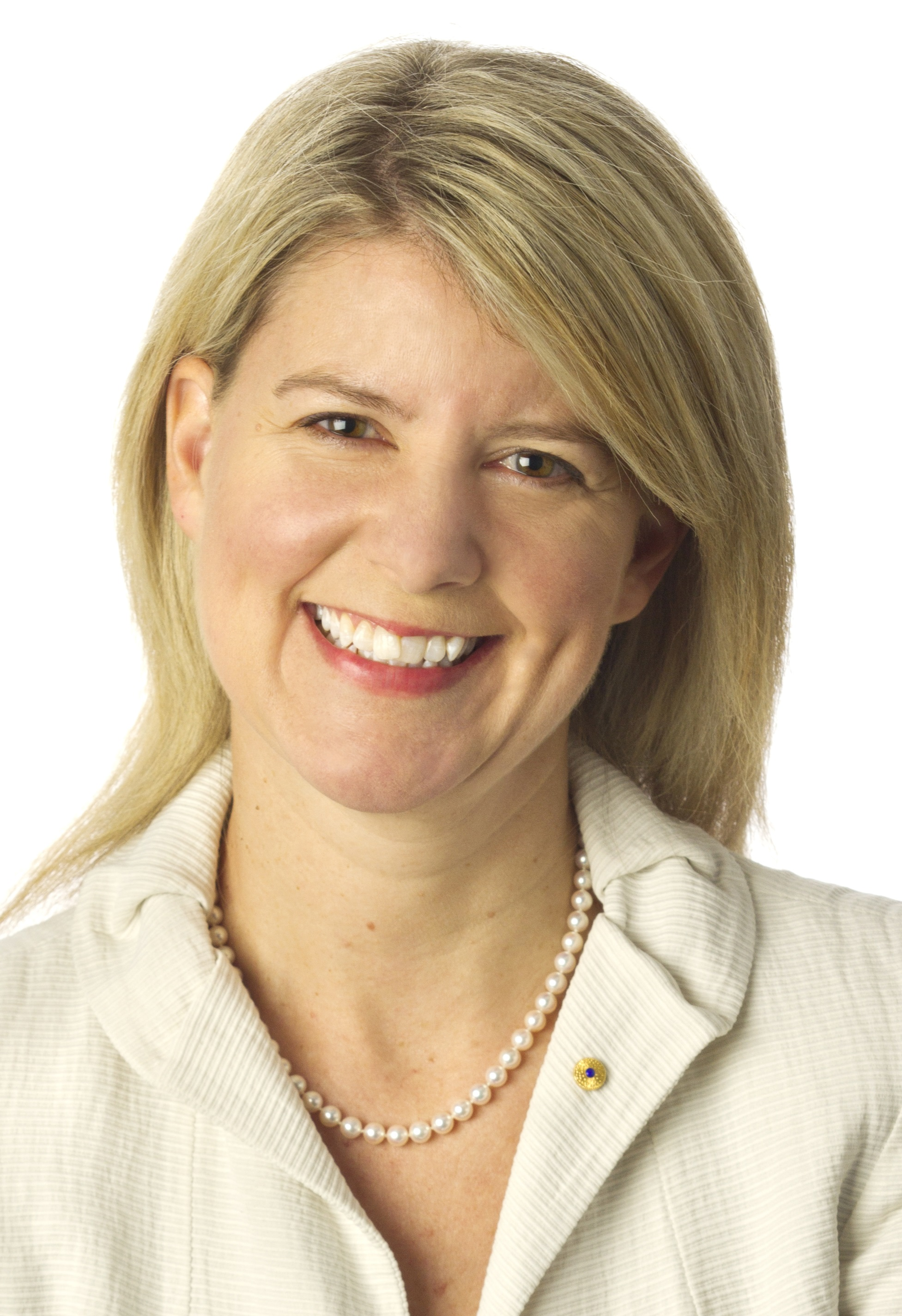
Senator Natasha Stott Despoja (republican) represented the Australian Democrats

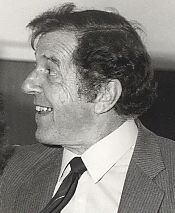
Don Chipp, founder of the Australian Democrats, was a delegate for Australians for Constitutional Monarchy

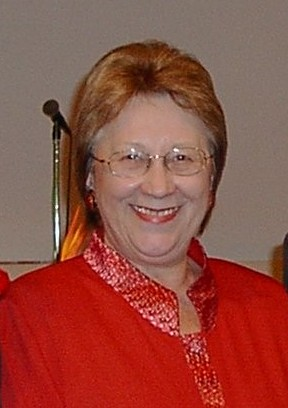
Trade Unionist Jennie George was an Australian Republican Movement delegate

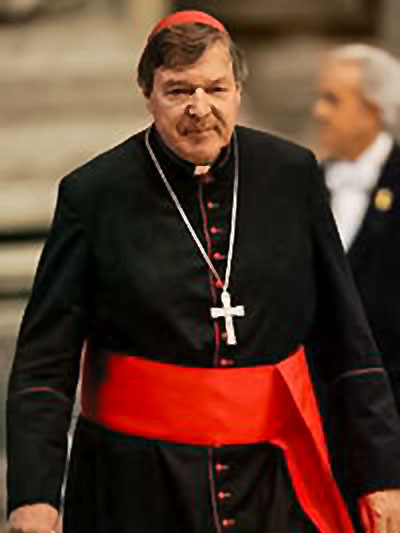
Then Archbishop of Melbourne, George Pell (republican), was an appointed delegate. Other leading clergy in attendance included Peter Hollingworth (abstained) and Tim Costello (republican)

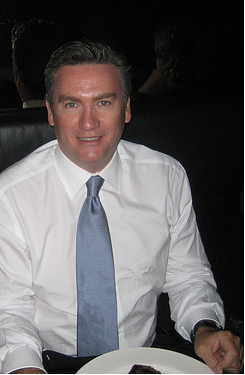
TV personality Eddie McGuire was an Australian Republican Movement delegate

A total of 152 delegates, from each state and territory and a wide diversity of backgrounds, gathered at Old Parliament House in Canberra. Seventy-six of the delegates were elected by a voluntary postal ballot. The other seventy-six were appointed by the federal government.

=== List of elected delegates ===
Order	Delegate name	Organisation	State/Territory
1	Malcolm Turnbull	Australian Republican Movement	New South Wales
2	Doug Sutherland	No Republic – ACM	New South Wales
3	Ted Mack	Ted Mack Group	New South Wales
4	Wendy Machin	Australian Republican Movement	New South Wales
5	Kerry Jones	No Republic – ACM	New South Wales
6	Ed Haber	Ted Mack Group	New South Wales
7	The Hon. Neville Wran AC QC	Australian Republican Movement	New South Wales
8	Cr Julian Leeser	No Republic – ACM	New South Wales
9	Karin Sowada	Australian Republican Movement	New South Wales
10	Peter Grogan	Australian Republican Movement	New South Wales
11	Jennie George	Australian Republican Movement	New South Wales
12	Christine Ferguson	No Republic – ACM	New South Wales
13	Alasdair Webster	Christian Democratic Party (Fred Nile Group)	New South Wales
14	Glenda Hewitt	ungrouped – I Care About Australia's Future	New South Wales
15	Dr Pat O'Shane AM	A Just Republic	New South Wales
16	Brigadier Alf Garland AM	Australian Monarchist League	New South Wales
17	Andrew Gunter	Ethos – Elect the Head of State	New South Wales
18	Hazel Hawke	Australian Republican Movement	New South Wales
19	Jason Yat-Sen Li	ungrouped – A Multi-Cultural Voice	New South Wales
20	Catherine Moore	Greens, Bill of Rights, Indigenous Peoples	New South Wales
21	Eddie McGuire	Australian Republican Movement	Victoria
22	The Hon. Don Chipp AO	No Republic – ACM	Victoria
23	The Rev. Tim Costello	Real Republic	Victoria
24	Bruce Ruxton OBE MBE	Safeguard the People	Victoria
25	Mary Delahunty	Australian Republican Movement	Victoria
26	Sophie Panopoulos	No Republic – ACM	Victoria
27	Steve Vizard	Australian Republican Movement	Victoria
28	Poppy King	Australian Republican Movement	Victoria
29	Lindsay Fox AO	Australian Republican Movement	Victoria
30	The Hon. Vernon Wilcox CBE QC	Safeguard the People	Victoria
31	Moira Rayner	Real Republic	Victoria
32	Misha Schubert	Republic4U – The Youth Ticket	Victoria
33	The Hon. Jim Ramsay	No Republic – ACM	Victoria
34	Kenneth Gifford QC	Australian Monarchist League	Victoria
35	Phil Cleary	ungrouped – Phil Cleary – Independent Australia	Victoria
36	Eric Bullmore	Shooters Party	Victoria
37	The Hon. Sir James Killen KCMG	No Republic – ACM	Queensland
38	Dr Clem Jones	Clem Jones Queensland Constitutional Republic Team	Queensland
39	The Hon. Michael Lavarch	Australian Republican Movement	Queensland
40	Dr Glen Sheil	Constitutional Monarchists	Queensland
41	Neville Bonner AO	No Republic – ACM	Queensland
42	David Muir	Clem Jones Queensland Constitutional Republic Team	Queensland
43	Sallyanne Atkinson AO	Australian Republican Movement	Queensland
44	Thomas Bradley	No Republic – ACM	Queensland
45	Florence, Lady Bjelke-Petersen	Constitutional Monarchists	Queensland
46	Mary Kelly	Women for a Just Republic	Queensland
47	Sarina Russo	Australian Republican Movement	Queensland
48	Cr Paul Tully	Queenslanders for a Republic	Queensland
49	Cr Ann Bunnell	Clem Jones Queensland Constitutional Republic Team	Queensland
50	Janet Holmes à Court	Australian Republican Movement	Western Australia
51	The Rt Hon. Reg Withers	No Republic – ACM	Western Australia
52	Prof. Peter Tannock	Australian Republican Movement	Western Australia
53	Geoff Hourn	No Republic – ACM	Western Australia
54	Graham Edwards	Australian Republican Movement	Western Australia
55	Clare Thompson	Australian Republican Movement	Western Australia
56	Marylyn Rodgers	No Republic – ACM	Western Australia
57	Liam Bartlett	ungrouped – An Open Mind for the Future	Western Australia
58	Prof. Patrick O'Brien	Elect the President	Western Australia
59	Kym Bonython	No Republic – ACM	South Australia
60	Dr Baden Teague	Australian Republican Movement	South Australia
61	The Rt Rev. John Hepworth	No Republic – ACM	South Australia
62	Linda Kirk	Australian Republican Movement	South Australia
63	Victoria Manetta	No Republic – ACM	South Australia
64	Dr Tony Cocchiaro	Australian Republican Movement	South Australia
65	Fr John Fleming	No Republic – ACM	South Australia
66	Kirsten Andrews	Australian Republican Movement	South Australia
67	Edward O'Farrell CVO CBE	No Republic – ACM	Tasmania
68	Julian Green	Australian Republican Movement	Tasmania
69	Michael Castle	No Republic – ACM	Tasmania
70	Marguerite Scott	Australian Republican Movement	Tasmania
71	Dr David Mitchell	The Australian Monarchist League	Tasmania
72	Eric Lockett	ungrouped – Voice of Ordinary, Fair-Minded, Thinking Citizens	Tasmania
73	Anne Witheford	Australian Republican Movement	Australian Capital Territory
74	Frank Cassidy	Australian Republican Movement	Australian Capital Territory
75	David Curtis	A Just Republic	Northern Territory
76	Michael Kilgariff	ungrouped – Territory Republican	Northern Territory

=== List of appointed delegates ===
Order	Delegate name	State/Territory	Category
1	Andrea Ang	Western Australia	Non-parliamentary
2	Stella Axarlis	Victoria	Non-parliamentary
3	Dannalee Bell	Victoria	Non-parliamentary
4	Julie Bishop	Western Australia	Non-parliamentary
5	Geoffrey Blainey AO	Victoria	Non-parliamentary
6	Greg Craven	Western Australia	Non-parliamentary
7	Miranda Devine	New South Wales	Non-parliamentary
8	Gatjil Djerrkura OAM	Northern Territory	Non-parliamentary
9	Mia Handshin	South Australia	Non-parliamentary
10	The Hon. Bill Hayden AC	Queensland	Non-parliamentary
11	The Most Revd Peter Hollingworth AO OBE	Queensland	Non-parliamentary
12	Mary Imlach	Tasmania	Non-parliamentary
13	Major General William James AO MBE MC	Queensland	Non-parliamentary
14	Adam Johnston	New South Wales	Non-parliamentary
15	Annette Knight AM	Western Australia	Non-parliamentary
16	Dame Leonie Kramer AC	New South Wales	Non-parliamentary
17	Helen Lynch AM	New South Wales	Non-parliamentary
18	The Hon. Richard McGarvie AC	Victoria	Non-parliamentary
19	Donald McGauchie AC	Victoria	Non-parliamentary
20	The Hon. Dame Roma Mitchell AC	South Australia	Non-parliamentary
21	Carl Möller	Tasmania	Non-parliamentary
22	Cr Joan Moloney	Queensland	Non-parliamentary
23	George Mye MBE AM	Queensland / TSI	Non-parliamentary
24	Ben Myers	Queensland	Non-parliamentary
25	Moira O'Brien	Northern Territory	Non-parliamentary
26	Lois O'Donoghue CBE AM	South Australia	Non-parliamentary
27	Sir Arvi Parbo AC	Victoria	Non-parliamentary
28	The Most Revd George Pell	Victoria	Non-parliamentary
29	Nova Peris-Kneebone	Western Australia / Northern Territory	Non-parliamentary
30	Peter Sams	New South Wales	Non-parliamentary
31	Judith Sloan	South Australia	Non-parliamentary
32	Sir David Smith KCVO AO	Australian Capital Territory	Non-parliamentary
33	Trang Thomas AM	Victoria	Non-parliamentary
34	Lloyd Waddy RFD QC	New South Wales	Non-parliamentary
35	George Winterton	New South Wales	Non-parliamentary
36	Heidi Zwar	Australian Capital Territory	Non-parliamentary
37	The Hon. John Howard MP	Prime Minister	Parliamentary
38	The Hon. Peter Costello MP	Treasurer	Parliamentary
39	The Hon. Daryl Williams AM QC MP	Attorney-General	Parliamentary
40	Senator the Hon. Robert Hill	Minister for the Environment	Parliamentary
41	Senator the Hon. Jocelyn Newman	Minister for Social Security	Parliamentary
42	Neil Andrew MP	Chief Government Whip	Parliamentary
43	Chris Gallus MP		Parliamentary
44	Kevin Andrews MP		Parliamentary
45	Senator Alan Ferguson		Parliamentary
46	The Hon. Tim Fischer MP	Deputy Prime Minister	Parliamentary
47	The Hon. John Anderson MP	Minister for Primary Industries and Energy	Parliamentary
48	Senator Ron Boswell	Leader of the National Party of Australia in the Senate	Parliamentary
49	The Hon. Kim Beazley MP	Leader of the Opposition	Parliamentary
50	The Hon. Gareth Evans QC MP	Deputy Leader of the Opposition	Parliamentary
51	Senator the Hon. John Faulkner	Leader of the Opposition in the Senate	Parliamentary
52	Senator Sue West	Deputy President of the Senate	Parliamentary
53	Senator the Hon. Nick Bolkus	Shadow Attorney-General	Parliamentary
54	Senator Kate Lundy		Parliamentary
55	Senator Natasha Stott Despoja	Deputy Leader of the Democrats	Parliamentary
56	Allan Rocher MP		Parliamentary
57	The Hon. Bob Carr MP	Premier of New South Wales	Parliamentary
58	The Hon. Peter Collins QC MP	Leader of the Opposition	Parliamentary
59	The Hon. Jeff Shaw QC	Attorney-General and Minister for Industrial Relations	Parliamentary
60	The Hon. Jeff Kennett MLA	Premier of Victoria	Parliamentary
61	John Brumby MLA	Leader of the Opposition	Parliamentary
62	The Hon. Pat McNamara MLA	Deputy Premier and Minister for Agriculture	Parliamentary
63	The Hon. Rob Borbidge MLA	Premier of Queensland	Parliamentary
64	Peter Beattie MLA	Leader of the Opposition	Parliamentary
65	The Hon. Denver Beanland MLA	Attorney-General and Minister for Justice	Parliamentary
66	The Hon. Richard Court MLA	Premier of Western Australia	Parliamentary
67	Geoff Gallop MLA	Leader of the Opposition	Parliamentary
68	The Hon. Hendy Cowan MLA	Deputy Premier of Western Australia	Parliamentary
69	The Hon. John Olsen FNIA MP	Premier of South Australia	Parliamentary
70	The Hon. Mike Rann MP	Leader of the Opposition	Parliamentary
71	The Hon. Mike Elliott MLC	Leader of the Australian Democrats	Parliamentary
72	The Hon. Tony Rundle MHA	Premier of Tasmania	Parliamentary
73	Jim Bacon MHA	Leader of the Opposition	Parliamentary
74	Christine Milne MHA	Leader of the Tasmanian Greens	Parliamentary
75	Kate Carnell MLA	Chief Minister of the Australian Capital Territory	Parliamentary
76	The Hon. Shane Stone MLA	Chief Minister of the Northern Territory	Parliamentary

== See also ==
- Pledge of Loyalty Act 2006 – New South Wales legislation
- History of Australia
- Australian Constitutional history
- Australian Constitution
- Monarchy in Australia
