= Multifunction Polis =

Formerly proposed community in Australia

Coordinates: 34°48′43″S 138°36′51″E

- Interactive map of Multifunction Polis

Population (Projected)
  - Total: 100,000−250,000

The Multifunction Polis (MFP) was a controversial scheme for a planned community in Australia proposed in 1987 and abandoned in 1998. From the Greek word polis, meaning "city", it was imagined as a place where work and leisure, lifetime education and intercultural exchange, research and manufacturing would be uniquely integrated.

The MFP was intended to have an initial population of 100,000, though some modelling was done on the assumption of a population up to 250,000. Futuristic infrastructure and modern communications were expected to help attract high-tech industries. Asian investors were targeted as an important source of funds, with an emphasis on Japanese investors.

Several possible locations were put forward and in 1990 a site at Gillman, north of Adelaide, was selected. The proposal generated noisy opposition in Australia, with some critics claiming it would open the way for a Japanese settlement on Australian soil. The MFP, at least as originally envisaged, never eventuated.

== History ==
In 1986 an international urban design competition seeking designs for “Kawasaki: Information City of the 21st Century” was sponsored by the Japan Association for Planning Administration and Mainichi Newspapers, with cooperation of ten ministries and three agencies of the Japanese government. The first phase of the competition was anonymous and attracted over 200 entries from more than twenty countries. Seventeen semi-finalists were selected and flown to Japan to present their entries in Kawasaki in 1986 – sixteen men and one woman, Zann Gill. The second phase of the competition occurred in 1987 and winners then learned that the competition not only sought ideas for Kawasaki, but also concepts for a showcase “city of the future” to be built in Australia, which became the ill-fated Multifunction Polis, a showcase for misguided bureaucracy.

The Multifunction Polis was first proposed in January 1987 by the Japanese Minister for International Trade and Industry (MITI), Hajime Tamura, at the ninth Australia-Japan Ministerial Committee meeting in Canberra.

A concept paper produced by MITI a month later said the Multifunction Polis would "become a forum for international exchange in the region and a model for new industries and new lifestyles looking ahead to the twenty-first century". More than 100 Australian and Japanese companies signed up to the MFP Joint Feasibility Study.

Site proposals were received from New South Wales, Victoria, Queensland, South Australia, Western Australia and the A.C.T. In 1990, the MFP Joint Steering Committee (chaired by ANZ Bank chief executive Will Bailey) awarded the project to the Gold Coast in Queensland, but after the state's premier, Wayne Goss, declined to consolidate the land under a public corporation, the Joint Steering Committee switched its choice to Gillman, near Adelaide in South Australia.

By that time, however, some potential Japanese investors had lost interest because of the negative publicity in Australia and repeated delays with the feasibility study. Others were discouraged by the choice of little-known Gillman for the site, rather than a location with strong appeal as a resort.

The Multifunction Polis project failed to attract the required investment, particularly after the bursting of the Japanese economic bubble in the early 1990s, and Australia's Federal Government withdrew funding in 1996. In 1998, the Premier of South Australia, John Olsen, officially announced the MFP's demise. The cost of the failed project to the Australian taxpayer was said to be $150 million.

Denis Gastin, chief executive of the MFP Joint Secretariat, said the loss of the project was an embarrassment to the nation: "It's an international embarrassment that we deliberately sought and captured international attention for a project that we did not deliver. South Australia had a chance to do something that would make the nation take it more seriously but what history shows is it bit off more than it could chew."

== Opposition to the Multifunction Polis ==
The MFP proposal was attacked in Australia by critics on the Left, who likened it to Japan's colonial experiment in Manchuria, and critics on the Right, who saw it creating an exclusive Japanese enclave.

The controversy boiled over during the Federal Election campaign of March 1990. Liberal Party leader, Andrew Peacock, declared that a future Coalition Government would abandon the project. Peacock shared the "enclave" fears of RSL president Alf Garland and others. The following day, The Australian newspaper ran a headline titled Peacock a 'danger in the Lodge'.'

Australian Labor Party leader Bob Hawke accused Peacock of delivering a "massive, full-on insult" to Japan. The ALP went on to win the election.

== Current status ==
Development eventually did proceed several kilometres further east at another northern Adelaide suburb, formerly called The Levels, where a campus of the University of South Australia was located. The South Australian Government, in conjunction with developer Delfin Lend Lease, proceeded along lines similar to those proposed for the MFP, although that name was dropped due to the controversy that had surrounded it.

The area is now occupied by Technology Park Adelaide and the suburb of Mawson Lakes. Technology Park features mostly high-tech industrial businesses, and the adjacent Mawson Lakes is a mostly residential development set around several artificial lakes. It features a mix of low and medium-density housing, nearly all of modern design. There are also numerous shops, cafes, restaurants, a hotel, and office-based businesses in Mawson Central (the business district of Mawson Lakes). All homes and businesses in the area feature recycled water for use in toilets and lawn watering, and a home management system which controls lighting, air-conditioning, and security installations. The layout of Mawson Lakes and Technology Park is designed to encourage residents to cycle or walk rather than drive, and there is also a centrally located bus and train interchange. Many educational and recreational facilities exist adjacent to Mawson Lakes, including a campus of the University of South Australia and a golf course.

== See also ==
- Garden Island (South Australia)
- One Australia (1988)
