= Patricia Moran =

Australian artist (1944–2017)

- Born: 25 September 1944; Victoria, Australia
- Died: 17 July 2017 (aged 72); Melbourne, Australia
- Known for: Painting

Patricia Moran (25 September 1944 – 17 July 2017), was an Australian Realist Artist. During her lifetime she taught painting, authored books, wrote magazine articles and produced videos illustrating her own technique. Her speciality was to paint floral works in oils.

She won the Alice Bale Overseas study scholarship and the Yorick club art prize in 1982 and gave workshops for the Victorian Artists Society. Patricia won many Awards and Art prizes during her career.

== Biography ==
Born in Melbourne, Victoria, Australia, Patricia initially worked as a Secretary. She eventually followed her desire to study painting full-time in 1977 and held her first solo exhibition in Melbourne in 1978. She was joint Winner of the coveted Alice Bale Overseas Study Award in 1982 which enabled her to study and paint in England and Europe, and she won numerous awards including Camberwell Rotary Art Prizes along with 2 Gold medals. In the 1980's Patricia tutored in portraiture at the Victorian Artists Society, Her passion to teach and encourage beginner artists led her to write instructive magazine articles for Artist magazines incl. The Australian Artist. These were followed by her first book “Painting The Beauty Of Flowers With Oils" published in 1991 which sold worldwide and was used as a textbook in Art Colleges, and by teachers of art and students alike. In 2000, she authored the book “The Oil Painter's Ultimate Flower & Portrait Companion”. Selected paintings of Patricia's were produced as prints and sold through Felix Rosensteil's Widow & Son Ltd, London. Her paintings have been featured in decor magazines including Vogue Living (2016). Her final accomplishment was producing a set of teaching DVDs 'Learn Classic Oil Painting with Patricia Moran' which are still available. Patricia's early work covered landscapes, portraits and still life, but her speciality was painting flowers in oils.

Her work was exhibited regularly in Australia and London and as well as being represented in many private collections, and acquired by academic and civic institutions..

Patricia Moran died 17 July 2017 after a short illness.
