= Alf Garland =

Alfred Barrett Garland
- Born: 19 March 1932; Sydney, New South Wales
- Died: 9 March 2002 (aged 69)
- Military career
- Allegiance: Australia
- Branch: Australian Army
- Service years: 1951–1984
- Rank: Brigadier
- Nickname: Alf
- Commands: 1st Squadron, Special Air Service Regiment
- Conflicts: Korean War; Indonesia–Malaysia confrontation Vietnam War
- Awards: Member of the Order of Australia; Mentioned in Despatches
- Other work: National President of the Returned and Services League of Australia (1988–93)

Brigadier Alfred Barrett Garland AM (19 March 1932 – 9 March 2002) was an Australian Army officer, and National President of the Returned and Services League of Australia (RSL) from 1988 to 1993. Garland had a distinguished military career, and attracted media attention by being outspoken on many controversial social issues, often antagonising the Keating government at the time.

== Military career ==
Garland's army career spanned 35 years. In 1965, he commanded the 1st Special Air Service squadron against Indonesian forces in Borneo. During the Vietnam War, he was second-in-command of the 7th Battalion, Royal Australian Regiment, and was appointed Australia's chief liaison officer to US forces.

== National Presidency of the RSL and activism ==
Garland was President of the Australian Capital Territory branch of the RSL, before becoming the RSL National President in 1988.

Garland was elected as the Australian Monarchist League delegate from New South Wales at the 1998 Australian Constitutional Convention. He joined Bruce Ruxton in campaigning against the notion of Australia becoming a republic. The two sat next to each other, angering republican delegates by opposing them on almost every point. In one attempt to filibuster debate, Garland recounted his family's loyalty to the Crown beginning in medieval times.

Garland was chairman of both the Australian Monarchist League NSW and ACT branches.

Garland also opposed the construction of the Japanese funded technology city known as the Multifunction Polis (MFP).

Garland was also opposed to Asian immigration, saying in 1988 Australia must alter the selection of immigrants to ensure Australia remained "predominantly European"."We want to retain Australia for Australians,".

Garland died at age 69, after suffering from motor neurone disease for several years.
