= David Mitchell (lawyer) =

Australian lawyer and Presbyterian minister (1934–2018)

David Charles Mitchell
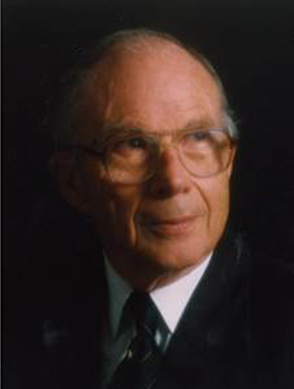
- Born: 13 March 1934; South Hobart, Tasmania, Australia
- Died: 6 May 2018 (aged 84); Dynnyrne, Tasmania, Australia
- Education: University of Tasmania
- Occupations: Lawyer, Christian Minister & Solicitor General

David Charles Mitchell (13 March 1934 – 6 May 2018) was a minister of the Presbyterian Church of Australia, a specialist in constitutional law and Solicitor-General for Lesotho.

Mitchell was born on 13 March 1934 at the St. Stephen's Private Hospital in South Hobart, Tasmania and grew up in the nearby suburb of Sandy Bay, Tasmania. He was educated at the University of Tasmania and admitted to the bar on 4 February 1958. In due course he was also admitted to the bar in Victoria, New South Wales, Australian Capital Territory, South Australia, Western Australia, England and Lesotho.

Mitchell worked for the British Colonial Service in the Bechuanaland Protectorate, now known as Botswana, as an Assistant District Officer on probation in the Serowe District in the year following his appointment on 24 March 1960. He subsequently joined the Commonwealth Public Service, where he was responsible for legal matters in Papua New Guinea for the then Department of External Territories. He transferred to the Attorney-General's Department, where he helped establish the Australian Legal Aid Office in 1974. The department sponsored him to, and he was a graduate of the International Institute of Human Rights in Strasbourg, France, before being seconded to Lesotho.

Mitchell was Solicitor-General for Lesotho in October 1976, when Lesotho was in dispute with its neighbour South Africa over the closure of three border crossings into the Transkei, that was designed to pressure Lesotho into recognizing this "homeland" established by South Africa for its Bantu peoples. He successfully presented the case for the government of Lesotho to the Security Council of the United Nations which resulted in an aid package of $US113 million.

Mitchell became a home missionary, pastoring the Presbyterian parish of Queanbeyan in New South Wales in 1979 and 1980 from the Lutheran Church of that town, and the new Presbyterian parish of Tuggeranong in the Australian Capital Territory from 1981. The congregation of the latter parish initially met at the Erindale Centre from 13 September, and moved to the Monash Primary School from 24 January, where he provided a Sunday School and Boys' Brigade. He was subsequently ordained, and, after a time, became Moderator of the Presbyterian Church of Tasmania in 1994. In that role, he presented the cases about, and voted against, the ordination of women within the Presbyterian Church of Australia. He believed that it was "a very complicated and divisive issue", and thought that his "motivation for so voting was very different from the motivation of most others". He believed that "it is a situation where men are forced to take a proper and full responsibility", having "a special accountability at the seat of judgment", and they "will be held more strictly to account". This was not a "retreat from reality", and gave women a "far superior position" where they could exercise a "softer, more compassionate touch". Subsequently, he pastored the Presbyterian Community Church at Rokeby, Tasmania from 2000 to 2003. He also acted as procurator for the General Assembly of the Presbyterian Church of Victoria, resigning in August 2000 after serving in that post for well over a decade. Subsequently, he acted temporarily in the same capacity for the South Australian Assembly of the Church in 2002, and was the convener of the Tasmanian Theological Education Committee in 2003.

Mitchell continued his association with Canberra, returning many times.

- In 1994, he gave a public lecture on the "constitution and Australia's future" on 27 January at the Albert Hall, where he advocated for the Australian monarchy for "legal, pragmatic and religious reasons", and also spoke at the summer school organized by Youth with a Mission.
- He was at regular speaker until 2009 at the annual Daniel 2:44 Conference in Canberra.

Mitchell was elected a delegate from Tasmania to the 1998 Australian Constitutional Convention as a member of the Australian Monarchist League, for which he was later patron. He "felt that he had been enormously privileged to have been a delegate at the convention, where overall there had been a good spirit of cooperation ... [but was] concerned that the push for a republic represents a tearing away from the Scriptural basis of our system of government, going back as far as Magna Carta and the Bill of Rights, which were under-girded by Scripture." He self-published a paperback booklet, Republic? The Hidden Agenda, and had it tabled at the convention. A complimentary copy was provided to every delegate at the convention, but inquiries afterwards revealed that many delegates claimed to be unaware of its existence, and most of those who acknowledged its existence admitted they had not read it. One even stated that he threw the booklet in the bin without opening it. He also contributed to the booklet, Democracy Down Under - Understanding Our Constitution, published by the Church and Nation Committee of the Presbyterian Church of Victoria.

Mitchell ran as one of two Australian Senate candidates in Tasmania for the Christian Democratic Party in the 2004 federal election. He received 2,270 primary votes and was eliminated after the 95th recount.

Subsequently, Mitchell campaigned against recognizing local government in the Australian Constitution, which he regarded as a "direct attack" against the States which would enable the Federal Government to "undermine or contradict state government policy". He also campaigned against an Australian Republic, and gay law reform.

Mitchell died after a long illness, at home in the Hobart suburb of Dynnyrne, Tasmania on 6 May 2018 and was buried at Cornelian Bay Cemetery on 10 May 2018, followed by a service of thanksgiving at St John's Presbyterian Church in central Hobart. He was survived by his 2nd wife, son and three grandsons.
