= Mina Guli =

Australian lawyer, businesswoman, and environmental activist

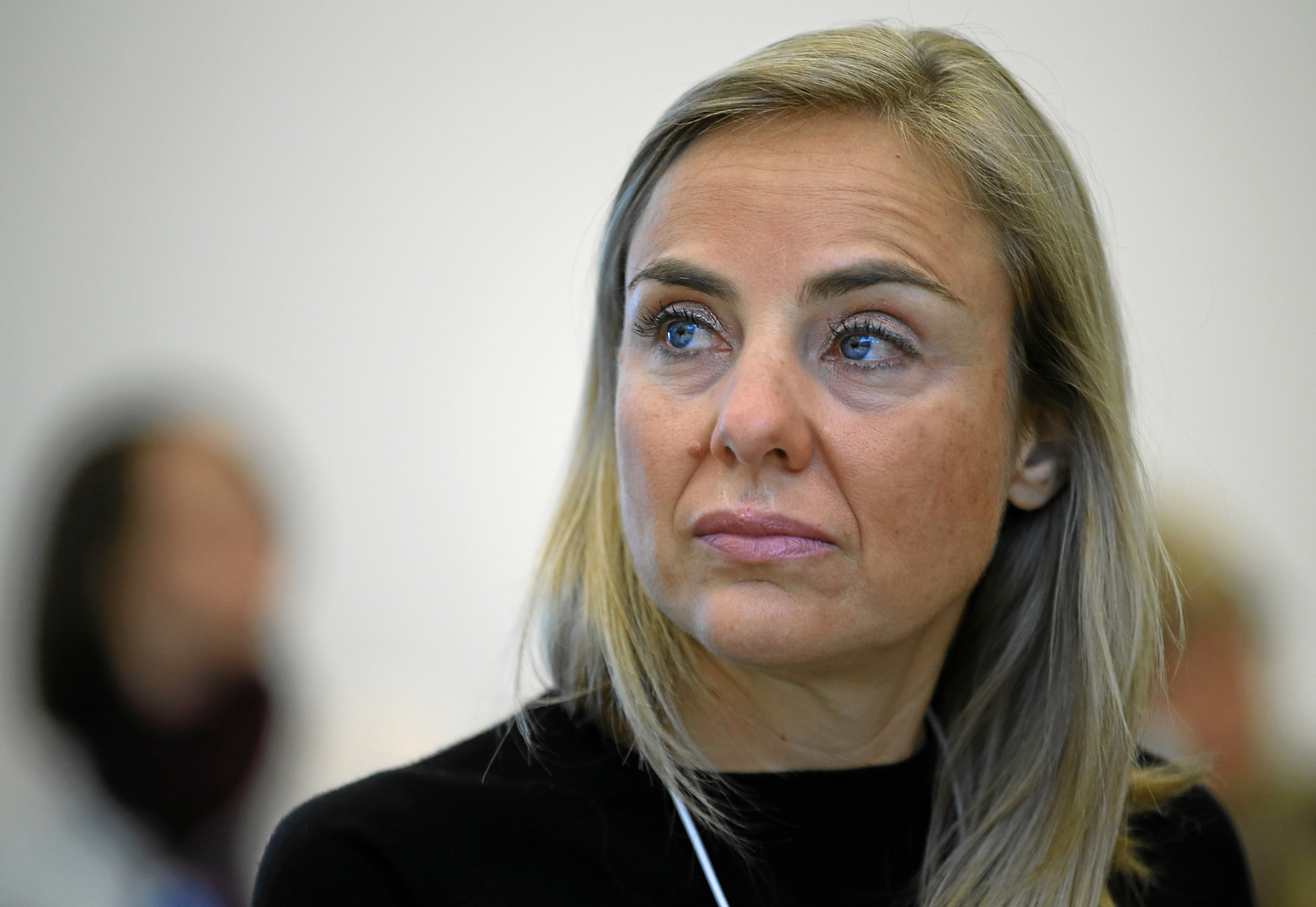
- Guli during the World Economic Forum 2013
- Born: c. 1970 (age 55–56); Mount Waverley, Melbourne, Australia
- Education: Monash University; Presbyterian Ladies’ College; The University of Melbourne
- Occupation: CEO of Thirst

Mina Guli is an Australian businesswoman, active in the environmental sector. She is CEO of Thirst.

== Early life and education ==
Guli was born in Mount Waverley, a suburb of Melbourne, Australia, and attended the University of Melbourne.. She studied a Master of Law at the university which she completed in 1999. In 1993, Guli was elected as president of the Monash University Student Union. At the age of 22, Guli broke her back in a swimming-pool accident and was told by her doctors that she would never run again.

== Career ==
After graduation, Guli worked as a lawyer in the private sector in the energy and infrastructure sectors. In 1999, she moved to the Sydney Futures Exchange, where she was involved in the development of Australia's carbon emission markets. In 2002, she was asked to join the World Bank and assisted in developing carbon trading projects in China, India, Nepal and Indonesia. She returned to the private sector in 2005 and continued her work in the renewable energy and climate change sectors in China.

In 2012, Guli founded Thirst, a group promoting water conservation to young people. Guli attempted to run one hundred marathons in one hundred days, to raise awareness of water scarcity, but a fractured femur forced her to abandon the attempt on day sixty-three.

Guli is the former deputy chairman of the Australian Chamber of Commerce in Beijing, a strategic advisor to the Joint US-China Collaboration on Clean Energy, a member of the World Economic Forum's Global Agenda Council on Sustainable Consumption, a member of the World Economic Forum's Young Global Leaders community, and a member of the Young Presidents Organisation.

== Awards ==
In 2010 she was recognised as a Young Global Leader by the World Economic Forum, and in 2011 named as one of Australia’s "50 for the future".
