= Donald McGauchie =

Australian farmer and businessman (born 1950)

Don McGauchie AO
- Born: Donald Gordon McGauchie; 1950 (age 75–76)
- Education: Geelong Grammar School
- Occupation: Company director
- Known for: National President, National Farmers Federation
- Board member of: Telstra; Nufarm; Reserve Bank of Australia
- Children: 3

Donald Gordon McGauchie AO (born 1950 (age 75–76)) is an Australian farmer and businessman. He was educated at Geelong Grammar School. He has a farming background, and is a senior partner of C & E McGauchie, Terrick West Estate, a poll merino stud in the Loddon Valley area of northern Victoria. From 1994 to 1998 was president of the National Farmers Federation.

McGauchie had strong links to the Liberal Party and then prime minister John Howard. During Howard's term of office, McGauchie accepted several advisory positions with the government, serving on the Prime Minister's Supermarket to Asia Council, the Foreign Affairs Council and the Trade Policy Advisory Council. He was a member of the board of the Reserve Bank of Australia from 2001 to 2011. In 2004 he succeeded Bob Mansfield as chairman of Telstra Corporation. After failing to meet expectations of large Telstra shareholders, McGauchie resigned from the position in May 2009, and was replaced by Catherine Livingstone. He also joined the board of Nufarm in 2003 and has been chairman since 2010.

McGauchie won the Rabobank Agribusiness Leader of the Year award in 2001. In 2004, he was appointed an Officer of the Order of Australia for services to the Australian grain and wool industries, and for his economic reform of Australian agricultural commodity handling and marketing.
