= Patrick O'Brien (political scientist) =

Australian political scientist and author

Patrick John (Paddy) O'Brien (12 January 1937, Wodonga, Victoria – 1998, Perth, Western Australia), was an Australian political scientist and author, teaching in the political science department of the University of Western Australia from 1969 until his death.

He was a vocal critic of WA Inc corruption and the Australian Labor Party in Western Australia (WA) in the 1980s, was embroiled in a university controversy, and was elected to the 1998 Australian Commonwealth Government's People's Constitutional Convention shortly before he died, in the same year

== Biography ==
O'Brien's parents were John Cornelius O'Brien and Monica Augusta Coore. He was educated at St Mary's Primary School, Ringwood, St John's Marist Brothers School, Hawthorn and St Kevin's Christian Brothers College, Toorak. He graduated from the University of Melbourne in 1967 (BA with combined honours in history and political science).

In 1961, he married Valerie Joy Prowse, with whom he had one son and two daughters. Prior to embarking on his academic career at the University of Western Australia (UWA) in 1969, he had worked as a press and radio journalist for four years and gained eight years' experience of teaching in primary, secondary and senior technical education. At UWA, he became an associate professor in political science "with a particular focus on twentieth century totalitarianism and was best known publicly for his involvement in two high-profile campaigns, as a leading critic of the Western Australian Burke Labor government ... and as a vocal direct-election republican". After his death, UWA established a Patrick O'Brien Foundation "in honour of his outstanding contribution to issues of public policy and political debate in Australia" with funds donated by colleagues, friends and admirers.

== Bibliography ==
- (Ed.) O'Brien, P and Webb, M The Executive State—WA Inc & The Constitution Constitutional Press, Perth (1991): ISBN 0-646-04875-9
- O'Brien, P The Saviours: An Intellectual History of the Left in Australia Drummond, Victoria, Australia 1977. ISBN 0-909081-17-4
- O'Brien, P Constitutional Conflict in Australia
- O'Brien, P The Liberals: Factions, Feuds and Fancies Viking, Melbourne, 1985. ISBN 978-0-670-80893-9
- (Ed.) O'Brien, P The Burke Ambush: Corporatism and Society in Western Australia Apollo Press, Perth, WA, 1986. ISBN 0-949901-04-0
- O'Brien, P Burke's Shambles: Parliamentary Contempt in the Wild West Burke Press, Melbourne, 1987. ISBN 0-9587698-0-X
- O'Brien, P The People's Case: Democratic and Antidemocratic Ideas in Australia's Constitutional Debate Australian Scholarly Publications, Collingwood, Vic, Australia, 1995. ISBN 1-875606-25-4
