= Peter Ellyard =

Peter Wake Ellyard (b. 13 April 1937, New South Wales) is a futurist, strategist, speaker and author living in Melbourne, Australia. He is known for his perspectives on, and as a speaker about, global trends and emerging global markets, and for his concepts and tools that enable individuals, organizations, communities and nations to become more effective future shapers.

Ellyard is currently chairman of the Preferred Futures Institute and the Preferred Futures Group, which he founded in 1991. He also chairs the Sustainable Prosperity Foundation and two startup environmental companies.

Ellyard is a former executive director for the Australian Commission for the Future. He held CEO positions in a number of public sector organizations over 15 years, including two associated with environment and planning, and one with industry and technology, and was also chief of staff of an Environment Minister in Canberra for 3 years. He is an adjunct professor of inter-generational strategies at the University of Queensland (formerly at Curtin University), and is an elected fellow of the Australian College of Educators, the Environment Institute of Australia and New Zealand, and the Australian Institute of Management. He is an elected member of the Union of International Associations.

Besides being a senior consultant to Organisation for Economic Co-operation and Development for 20 years, Ellyard has been a senior adviser to the United Nations for more than 30 years, including to the 1992 Earth Summit, where he was a senior advisor (the only Australian) on both the climate change and the biodiversity conventions. He also advised a number of International conferences, including the United Nations Conference on the Human Environment (1971), The UN Conference on Human Settlements (1976). At other times he has been a senior consultant to the UNEP, UNDP and UNESCO.

== Early life ==
Born in Wagga Wagga, Australia, he is one of six children of Samuel and Marjorie Ellyard. His parents were both teachers and school principals. After an early education in NSW State schools, he graduated from Sydney University in 1958 in agricultural science. He was awarded the William Farrer Memorial Scholarship and entered Cornell University, where he completed a Master of Science in micrometeorology, and a PhD in biochemistry, organic chemistry and plant sciences. After postgraduate studies at Brandeis University and the Charles F. Kettering Research Institute, he worked for a year in the advance staff in Senator Eugene McCarthy's unsuccessful campaign for the US presidency in 1968. This was followed in 1969 by work for the City of New York in the social justice program 'Model Cities'. Following a new interest in public policy, he commenced working in the emerging environmental sciences and environmental public policy domain, that commenced with the passage through the US Congress of the 1969 US National Environmental Policy Act (NEPA).

== Early work in environmental public policy ==
Returning to Australia in 1970 he became policy specialist in environment, science and technology policy in the National Parliament's Legislative Research Service in Canberra. This appointment was the result of a far-sighted initiative of the then Parliamentary Librarian Alan Fleming, who soon after was appointed as National Librarian. At that time there were no government environment departments and Peter's appointment was probably the nation's first appointment in the environment public policy field. He also worked in 1972 with the Canadian Council of Ministers of the Environment in Montreal. Peter also initiated at that time the nation's first school environmental education program, INSPECT, that resulted in the publication of two books that he co-edited, 'Bad luck dead duck' (1970) and 'What a mess less confess' (1971).

With the election of the Whitlam government in 1972 he was appointed Chief of staff of Environment Ministers in that government, becoming a major architect of the first national environment laws and policies between 1972 and 1975. These included the first national laws in environmental protection, heritage, for the protection and management of Australia's Great Barrier Reef, and the protection of migratory birds. He also contributed to public policy in urban management and planning and in national infrastructure planning.

In 1976 he was invited to become the foundation CEO of Papua New Guinea's Environment department. He established the first national program in environmental policy and legislation. This included the passage of three historic pieces of environmental legislation through the National Parliament of Papua New Guinea in 1978. He followed this trajectory further, playing a similar role as CEO of South Australia's Environment Department between 1979 and 1983. He then broadened his public policy experience when he was appointed as CEO responsible for industry and technology policy in South Australia.

== Career change to work in futures ==
In 1988 he was invited to become the CEO of Australia's Commission for the Future, a major new initiative of the Hawke government. This commenced a new career path in futures that still continues. He established his own organisation the Preferred Futures Institute after his departure from the Commission for the Future in 1991. This was renamed the 2050 Institute in 2012.

== Publications ==
- Ideas for the New Millennium (Pub. Melbourne University, 1998 & 2000)
- Designing 2050: Pathways to Sustainable Prosperity on Spaceship Earth (Pub. Lulu Enterprises, 2008)
- Destination 2050: Concepts Bank and Toolkit for Future-Makers (Pub. Preferred Futures Institute, 2012
- The Future Knowledge Compendium: A Curriculum for Thriving in the 21st Century (Pub. Austin Macauley Publishers Ltd, 2023)
