= Max O'Halloran =

Australian rules footballer (1952–2026)

Personal information
- Full name: Max William O'Halloran
- Born: 20 May 1952; Smithton, Tasmania, Australia
- Died: 15 July 2026 (aged 74)
- Original team: Ulverstone
- Height: 178 cm (5 ft 10 in)
- Weight: 85 kg (187 lb)

Playing career
Years	Club	Games (Goals)
1972–1974	Footscray	13 (2)
1974	Carlton	5 (0)
Total		18 (2)

Max O'Halloran (20 May 1952 – 15 July 2026) was an Australian rules footballer who played with Footscray and Carlton in the Victorian Football League (VFL).

== Sporting career ==
O'Halloran played for Footscray and Carlton when he was in Victoria. He then became a coach, with Darwin and Windsor-Zillmere in Brisbane. Upon moving to Cairns, he played for South Cairns briefly and then North Cairns in 1979. He was a player in the North Cairns when they won the premiership in 1980 and 1984. He coached North Cairns to a premiership victory in 1985. He then coached the Cairns Saints, becoming head coach in the early-1990s and winning the 1995 premiership. In 2025, O'Halloran coached the Cairns Saints Division 3.

He served on the board of AFL Cairns from 1998 to 2007. He was awarded life membership of AFL Cairns and the North Cairns Football Club. In 2011, he received a merit award from AFL Queensland.

== Political career ==
In 2012, O'Halloran ran for election in Division Seven of the Cairns Regional Council. He was elected that year and served until 2024.

== Death ==
O'Halloran died on 15 July 2026, at the age of 74.
