= Martyn Webb =

Professor of geography and writer

Martyn Jack Webb (29 September 1925 – 19 January 2016) was a professor of geography and writer on issues of governance. An Oxford graduate, he was foundation Professor of Geography at the University of Western Australia.

As a geographer, he had a long-term interest in metropolitan planning in Perth.

He had written a number of books in collaboration with his wife Audrey, such as his large work on Kalgoorlie.

At times, he collaborated with other writers such as Paddy O'Brien on various causes.

He was not short of praise for a range of Australian political figures, including John Forrest.

Webb died in early 2016, his death being noted by his original University, Oxford. One death notice described him as a "public intellectual, author, traveller and champion of causes". When he deposited papers some time before, the library cataloguer summarised his career as:

Foundation Professor of Geography at University of Western Australia. Active in local affairs and development, advisor to the WA Country Shire Councils Association, initiator of the WA Local Government Association and the WA Conservation Council; Member of the WA Chamber of Commerce and Industry, ...
