= Misha Schubert =

Australian journalist

Misha Schubert (born 22 February 1973) is an Australian newspaper journalist. She was appointed chief executive officer of Science & Technology Australia in March 2020. She was formerly Director, Strategic Communications at Universities Australia. She was previously Director of Communications for the RECOGNISE movement, campaigning for recognition of Aboriginal and Torres Strait Islander people in the Australian Constitution. Prior to this Schubert was national political editor for The Sunday Age, political correspondent for The Age and a reporter for The Australian.

Schubert has been a vice president of the National Press Club of Australia since 2008, having been elected to the Board in 2006. She is also a life member of the YWCA Victoria.
