= Peter Tannock =

Australian rules footballer, coach, administrator, and academic

Personal information
- Full name: Peter Darcy Tannock
- Born: 2 October 1940 (age 86)

Playing career^{1}
Years	Club	Games (Goals)
1963–1966	East Perth	51 (26)
- ^{1} Playing statistics correct to the end of 1966.

Peter Darcy Tannock AM (born 2 October 1940) is a former academic and Australian rules football player, coach and administrator.

Tannock was made a Member of the Order of Australia (AM) in the 1996 Queen's Birthday Honours for "service to education, particularly through the Catholic Education Commission and Notre Dame University". He was awarded the Australian Sports Medal in 2000 for his service to Australian football and the Centenary Medal in 2001 for "service as Vice Chancellor, University of Notre Dame and to the Catholic Education Commission."

Tannock was chair of the West Australian Football Commission for its first 10 years. In 2011, he was inducted into the West Australian Football Hall of Fame.
