= Poppy King =

Australian entrepreneur (born 1972)

- Born: 23 May 1972 (age 54); Melbourne, Victoria, Australia
- Occupation: Entrepreneur
- Years active: 1991−present
- Known for: Cosmetic stores
- Parent: Rachelle King

Poppy Cybele King (born 23 May 1972) is an Australian entrepreneur. She is best known for her company Poppy Industries and the range of cosmetics available at Poppy Stores in Australia, during the 1990s.

== Early life ==
King was born to a Jewish family and was educated at Lauriston Girls' School in Melbourne, and Wesley College, Melbourne. Her father died of cancer when she was seven.

== Business career ==
King started her own cosmetics company in 1991 at the age of 19. Poppy Industries mainly produced a wide colour range of opaque lipsticks. The head office was located in Melbourne. Within three years, the company had grown to be one of the biggest cosmetic companies in Australia. In 1995 she received the Young Australian of the Year award and that year the company made a profit of $6.5 million.

In 1998, after expansion into the U.S. market, the company went into receivership, and was sold. With further outside investment the company continued until 2002, when it was sold to an American corporation, and King moved to the United States. In 1999, the Australian Securities & Investments Commission investigated allegations that Poppy Industries traded while it was insolvent, however the Commission later released a statement clearing the company of any wrongdoing.

In 2006, King launched a new brand called "Lipstick Queen". Lipstick Queen is currently stocked globally in department multiple stores, including Sephora, Bloomingdales and Mecca. In 2018, Elle Australia listed her Frog Prince lipstick, which changes from green to pink on application, as one of the 10 most iconic lipstick shades of all time.

== Personal life ==
King currently lives in New York City. She wrote Lessons of a Lipstick Queen, published by Atria Books in August 2008.
