= Sarina Russo =

Australian-Italian businessperson

Sarina Russo AM
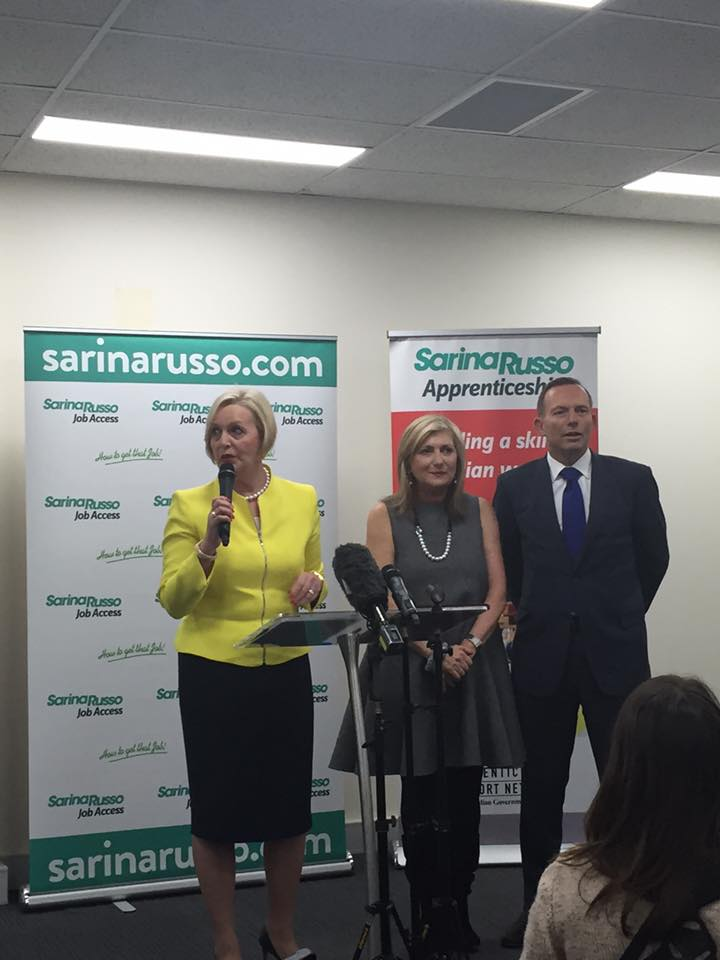
- Sarina Russo launches jobactive contract at Sarina Russo Job Access Ringwood with Prime Minister Tony Abbott, September 2015.
- Born: Sarina Russo; Castiglione di Sicilia, Italy
- Occupations: Entrepreneur - Founder and Managing Director of Sarina Russo Group

Sarina Russo AM is an Australian-Italian businessperson and the founder of The Sarina Russo Group.

== Early life ==
Russo migrated to Australia from Sicily with her family in 1956, and attended St Stephen's Primary School and All Hallows' School.

== Career ==
She worked as a legal secretary and as a part-time typing teacher. Russo launched "The Office Business Academy" in 1979.

In recognition of sustained, outstanding entrepreneurial achievement, Ernst & Young recognised Russo as their "2018 Champion of Entrepreneurship" (Northern Region).

As at 2018, Sarina Russo Job Access operates across more than 200 sites, employs more than 1000 people and helped elevate Russo to the 12th spot on the BRW Women’s Rich List in 2015.

The Sarina Russo Group is made up of: Sarina Russo Job Access Australia; Sarina Russo Recruitment; Sarina Russo Apprenticeships; VOICE Psychologists and Allied Professionals, Sarina Russo Institute, Russo Business School, James Cook University Brisbane, Sarina Russo White House, Sarina Russo Global Initiative (not-for-profit arm) and Sarina Investments.

Russo is a member of the Clinton Global Initiative, Queensland Premier’s Annastacia Palaszczuk's Advisory Board, Women’s Leadership Board of the John F. Kennedy School of Government, the Leading Women Entrepreneurs of the World, and a former Trustee of the Jupiter’s Casino Community Benefit Fund since 1995.

Russo was appointed a Member of the Order of Australia in the 2024 King's Birthday Honours for "significant service to business, to the community, and to vocational education and training".
