= Process model (Australia) =

A process model is, in the context of the republic debate in Australia, a model for the process by which the questions surrounding whether and how Australia should become a republic may be answered. A number of process models have been processed. Proposed process models are a subject of debate within the Republicanism movement. Such debate usually surrounds whether the people (via one or more referendums or plebiscites) should be asked to choose between the current system and a general republican system of government, one specific republican system of government, or multiple alternative republican systems of government.

== Background ==
To amend the Constitution of Australia, a referendum must be held and historically citizens have usually voted to reject the proposed amendment. In recent years, the most prominent constitutional reform issue has been whether to establish an Australian republic. As this issue is controversial and technical, governments, political parties and republican organisations have developed process models to help align their decisions with public sentiment. These decisions include the type of republic to establish and/or whether to proceed and hold a referendum.

Supporters of constitutional monarchy are not served by commencing such a process and argue that conventions and plebiscites are unnecessary and poor use of government money.

== Process model events ==
A process model involves a series of events, usually ending in a referendum or a decision to not proceed. The following events are commonly found in republican process models:

=== Constitutional convention ===
A constitutional convention may include elected or appointed delegates to discuss and vote upon issues and reform proposals. If the delegates are a close representative sample of the population, decisions will be indicative of subsequent referendum results.

That delegates have the opportunity and interest to review the issues in depth is both an advantage and a disadvantage. Informed decisions may result from delegates increased understanding of the issues, however as this happens their views become less representative of the general population. For example, at the 1998 constitution convention, delegates supporting direct-election fared poorly in the voting in contrast to the results of opinion polls.

=== Non-binding plebiscite ===
A non-binding plebiscite is where all voters answer an important question without changing the constitution. Two fundamental and inter-related questions have characterised republican debate:

1. What republican system is best for Australia? – the model question
2. Should Australia become a republic? – the threshold question

A referendum involves voters in the second question and only in accordance with the constitution, however a plebiscite advantageously can involve voters in the first question and for both questions bypass the need to draft a specific constitutional amendment. For example, the model question can be a multiple choice question rather than Yes or No.

Plebiscites have the advantage of being inherently democratic. According to Labor's Nicola Roxon, "you cannot go wrong by simply asking the Australian people what they think – and put the decision in their hands."

The disadvantage is that plebiscite questions are inter-related. How a voter answers one question is affected by how they, or the electorate, answers the other. This creates controversy when the sequence, the voting procedure and/or the wording of the question seems to favour one side. Furthermore, each question raises its own issues:

==== Model question ====
The model question asks what republican system is best. A typical proposal for a model plebiscite offers a choice of between 4 and 6 models by numbering preferentially. For example, the 2004 Senate Report, Road to a Republic recommended a list as follows:

- Prime Ministerial appointment
- Appointment by a two-thirds majority of a joint sitting of parliament
- Appointment by an electoral college, which has been elected on the same basis as the Senate
- Direct election of Parliament's candidates: Powers of head of state to be codified
- Direct election by the people: Powers of head of state to be codified

The advantage of the model question for republicans is that once a choice is made, internal debate will lessen and they can focus on refining and promoting the one system. A disadvantage is that some models are excluded, for example the McGarvie Model is not mentioned in the above list even though it was successful at the 1998 constitutional convention.

Some republicans believe that the success of a direct-election model is a foregone conclusion. Conservative republican Greg Craven believes that the "model with the shallowest surface appeal will win ... with problems that will surface later."

Supporters of the status quo argue that voters must also have the option of voting for no change, which would have the effect of intertwining this question with the threshold question.

==== Threshold question ====
The threshold question asks whether Australia should become a republic. The wording of the proposal varies considerably, however to take an interesting example, Dr Barry Gardner suggests "do you favour Australia becoming a republic through the use of a model approved by a majority of the Australian people?".

The example makes clear that the threshold question makes sense if posed before the model question. If the two questions were posed on the same ballot, then the threshold question would appear first. The example also tries to address what is known at the 'blank cheque' problem—that one may not know exactly what they are voting for.

The threshold question invites both risk and opportunity for both republicans and monarchists. For republicans it is a chance to sift the model debate out of the equation and obtain a clear indicator of public support, which according to the Australian Republican Movement (ARM) is "what monarchists fear the most".

However, for status quo supporters, it is an opportunity to close down the republican debate for the long-term. Australians for Constitutional Monarchy's (ACM) Kerry Jones says "I believe we would win it.... Plebiscites would strengthen the current system because people would say, 'Look at the can of worms that that is opening up.'"

Monarchists officially object to the threshold plebiscite on the basis it subverts the intent of the amendment procedure of the Australian constitution. Opponents raise the concern that it could undermine confidence in the constitution prior to a republic being established.

==== Title and other plebiscite questions ====
Some republicans suggest that other plebiscite questions should be asked, so to increase voter input to the eventual republican proposal. The question "what shall we call the Head of State?" is independent, to a large extent, of the models question and can be asked on the same ballot paper. Critics of such a question say it "will only distract the electorate".

=== Referendum ===
A referendum is typically the last component of any process model and the only established way of changing the constitution. A proposal must be approved by parliament. Prior to voting every household is sent a copy of the amendment and an argument of equal weight for voting Yes and for voting No. To pass at referendum, the proposal must obtain approval from a majority of voters nationally and a majority in four states.

==== Multi-choice referendum ====
A non-binding plebiscite does not change the constitution. An alternative proposal, a multi-choice referendum, involves altering the law concerning referendums, to offer a new way of amending the constitution. This is also known as a binding plebiscite.

If implemented, voters would receive a ballot paper with a list of models, similar to the non-binding models plebiscite described earlier. Each model would be associated with a specific set of constitutional amendments. The preferential IRV voting system would be used to select the successful model and the associated amendments would then be made.

This type of proposal is argued to be possible because the relevant section of the constitution is not specific, saying "the vote shall be taken in such manner as the Parliament prescribes." Tim Fischer put forward a similar proposal which converts the threshold plebiscite into a special referendum, held in advance, to absolutely confirm the legality of this procedure. Nevertheless, the proposal has received little support and there are clear political and legal risks. Opponents of republicanism would probably ask the High Court to declare that the proposal was unconstitutional.

== Important process models ==
=== Howard government policy ===
When John Howard became Prime Minister of Australia in 1996, he initiated the first process model which concluded with the 1999 republic referendum.

The process commenced with the election of 76 delegates to a constitutional convention. In the election, delegates obtained support by declaring their general views on republicanism rather than through being members of a political party. A further 76 delegates where chosen by the Prime Minister and taken from the leadership of political parties from the federal parliament and the various states and territories of Australia.

In his speech to open the convention, Prime Minister Howard declared that "if clear support for a particular republican model emerges from this Convention my government will ... put that model to a referendum of the Australian people [however if] this Convention does not express a clear view [then] the people will be asked to vote in a plebiscite which presents them with all the reasonable alternatives. A formal constitutional referendum, offering a choice between the present system and the republican alternative receiving most support in the plebiscite, would then follow."

The convention voted in support of the bi-partisan appointment republican model and then voted in support of it being put in a referendum.

That referendum was held on 6 November 1999 and was not successful.

For the remainder of his time in office, John Howard argued that there was no necessity to commence a new process as nothing significant has changed since the referendum.

=== Corowa conference ===
In 2001, a conference on developing new process models was initiated by Richard McGarvie. It was held in Corowa, New South Wales being the place where the movement for Federation was restarted in the 1890s after it had stalled. Opponents of republicanism also attended the conference.

McGarvie's preferred process involved asking all the parliaments of Australia to establish model development committees, which would design very detailed models. The models would then be put to a plebiscite. The winning model for each jurisdiction would be put to a special referendum which would change the Federation and the States simultaneously into a republic.

The successful proposal was organised by George Winterton and called the "Royal Hotel Proposal" after the location of their late night negotiations. It said there should be a plebiscite that should ask essentially two questions:

- Do you favour a republic as opposed to the Monarchy? Then
- If there is a republic, which of the four following models do you want?

Subsequent to this delegates would be elected to a constitutional convention to draft the actual proposal in detail, which would go ultimately to a referendum.

=== ALP three-step process ===
The Australian Labor Party has long planned a three-step process involving:

- A threshold plebiscite
- If that plebiscite is successful, a models plebiscite
- A referendum based upon the successful model

Originally Labor was to hold each stage at the same time as a general election, so a republic could not be established until nine years had passed, assuming full terms. In April 2004, former leader Mark Latham fast tracked the timetable saying "We'd want to get that done in our first term. So have the first plebiscite then the second and then by the time of the following election would be good timing for a constitutional referendum."

Former Labor Prime Minister Kevin Rudd, acknowledged that becoming a republic was an important part of the nation's future but would not be a priority in his first term in government.

=== ARM proposal ===
The Australian Republican Movement now supports a non-bind plebiscite to decide the model, followed by a binding referendum to amend the Constitution, reflecting the model chosen.

=== Further reading ===
- Road to a Republic, 2004
