= Australian head of state dispute =

Dispute regarding the monarch and governor-general

The Australian head of state dispute is a debate as to who is considered to be the head of state of Australia—the monarch, the governor-general, or both. Both are described in official sources as "head of state" but the Australian constitution does not mention the term. A number of writers, most notably Sir David Smith, have argued that the term is better used to describe the governor-general. The difference of opinion has mainly been discussed in the context of Australia becoming a republic, and was prominently debated in the lead-up to the republic referendum in 1999.

== Background ==
The Australian constitution dates from 1901, when the Dominions of the British Empire were not sovereign states, and does not use the term head of state. In respect of the government of Australia, the monarch, currently King Charles III, who has reigned since 8 September 2022, is represented in Australia by the governor-general, in accordance with the Constitution. Charles is also the sovereign of the fourteen other Commonwealth realms, in which the King is regarded as head of state. But in Australia the term "head of state" has been used in discussion as a convenient term for describing the person holding the highest rank among the officers of government.

In his 1993 book The Reluctant Republic, Malcolm Turnbull explained that, at Federation, the "Governor-General acted partly as head of state and partly as the local representative of the British Government", the latter being the Queen as advised by the Privy Council. As with the other former Dominions, Australia gained legislative independence from the UK by virtue of the Statute of Westminster 1931, which was adopted in Australia in 1942 with retroactive effect from 3 September 1939. By the Royal Style and Titles Act 1953, the Australian parliament gave the Queen the title Queen of Australia and, in 1973, removed from the Queen's Australian style and titles any reference to her status as Queen of the United Kingdom and Defender of the Faith. Australia's full independence from the UK was achieved with the Australia Act 1986.

Section 61 of the constitution states that "The executive power of the Commonwealth is vested in the Queen and is exercisable by the Governor‑General as the Queen's representative, and extends to the execution and maintenance of this Constitution, and of the laws of the Commonwealth." Section 2 provides that a governor-general shall represent the Queen in Australia. The governor-general is appointed by the monarch on the advice of the prime minister of Australia. In practice, the governor-general carries out all the functions usually performed by a head of state, without reference to the King; though the governor-general is the King’s representative, he or she is not the monarch's delegate or agent. Under the conventions of the Westminster system, the governor-general's powers are almost always exercised on the advice of the prime minister or other ministers of the Crown. The governor-general may use the reserve powers of the Crown as prescribed by the constitution, though these are rarely exercised. One notable example of their use was by Governor-General Sir John Kerr during the Australian constitutional crisis of 1975.

The question of whether the monarch or the governor-general is Australia's head of state became a political one in the years prior to the Australian republic referendum in 1999. Among arguments advanced in that campaign some were for retaining the office of governor-general as the monarch's (nominal) representative, and others were for a popularly elected head of state. Republicans included in their campaign the idea that the Queen was head of state and not Australian and, as such, should be replaced with an Australian citizen; this was summed up in their slogan "a mate for head of state". Opponents of the move to make Australia a republic claim in response that Australia already has an Australian as head of state in the governor-general, who, since 1965, has invariably been an Australian citizen. The governor-general in 2004, Major General Michael Jeffery, said at the time: "Her Majesty is Australia's head of state but I am her representative and to all intents and purposes I carry out the full role." However, the following year, he declined to name the Queen as head of state, instead saying in response to a direct question, "the Queen is the monarch and I represent her and I carry out all the functions of head of state." The governor-general normally represents Australia internationally, making and receiving state visits, but the monarch also carries out some official duties representing Australia outside Australia, such as in the United Kingdom.

== Various opinions ==
Within Australia, newspapers, ministers, constitutional scholars and the general public have not always been consistent in references to either the monarch or the governor-general as the head of state. Sir David Smith's lecture reviewing the state of opinion in Australia, published as Papers on Parliament No. 27, March 1996, ended by quoting some remarks made the year before by Sir Gerard Brennan, Chief Justice of Australia, on the oaths of allegiance and office:

The first promise is a commitment of loyalty to Her Majesty the Queen, her heirs and successors according to law. It is a commitment to the head of State under the Constitution. It is from the Constitution that the Oath of Allegiance, which has its origins in feudal England, takes its significance in the present day. As the Constitution can now be abrogated or amended only by the Australian people in whom, therefore, the ultimate sovereignty of the nation resides, the Oath of Allegiance and the undertaking to serve the head of State as Chief Justice are a promise of fidelity and service to the Australian people. The duties which the oath imposes sit lightly on a citizen of the nation which the Constitution summoned into being and which it sustains. Allegiance to a young, free and confident nation, governed by the rule of law, is not a burden but a privilege.

— Spoken at a ceremonial sitting of the High Court on 21 April 1995.

Reviewing the position in 2000, former Justice of the High Court of Australia, Michael Kirby concluded that the governor-general would increasingly take over as virtual head of state of Australia and the office would continue to evolve as an Australian peculiarity; and that while most Australians would continue to feel republican in their hearts, many would continue to have a vague lingering affection for the monarch, and some feel a measure of respect for the idea of the Crown as "a notion above the transient allegiances of party politics with its vital but often banal concerns".

When Quentin Bryce was governor-general from 2008 to 2014 the Museum of Australian Democracy summed up the situation: "Because the Queen lives in the United Kingdom, she is represented in Australia by the Governor-General, who is in effect Australia's Head of State. Some authorities argue that the Governor-General is Australia's Head of State in every respect: others disagree."

=== Official sources ===
As at 2026, the Parliamentary Education Office website states: "Australia is a constitutional monarchy and our head of state is the King" and another official government website has a whole section devoted to "Australia's Head of State" being Charles III.

In the past, many sources published by the government of Australia have used the term "head of state" to refer to the monarch, with some providing explanatory statements. This includes Parliament House, and the Departments of the Attorney-General, Immigration and Citizenship, and Foreign Affairs. Yet another calls the governor-general the "constitutional Head of State" and the monarch the "Head of State". However, between 1992 and 1999, the Commonwealth Government Directory listed the governor-general in these terms: "Function: Under the Constitution the Governor-General is the Head of State in whom the Executive Power of the Commonwealth is vested."

In 2009, a media release from Prime Minister Kevin Rudd referred to a tour by Quentin Bryce as a "visit to Africa of this scale by Australia’s Head of State"; and the following year, his spokesperson told the press the Queen "held that position". In a press release issued that year by the Queen's private secretary to announce the Queen would make a speech to the United Nations, Elizabeth II was mentioned as head of state of Australia, amongst 15 other countries. In the Department of the Parliamentary Library's publication Research Note, Peter Ireland concluded that "the Constitution can be used to argue either proposition". Australian Senate Procedures devotes a chapter to the practical aspects of the head of state, saying, "Canada, Australia and New Zealand have two heads of state, the Queen as the symbolic head of state and the Governor-General as the constitutional head of state."

The issue has been occasionally raised in the High Court of Australia but never directly ruled on by that court. One ruling, cited first by Professor David Flint and later by Sir David Smith, is the 1907 decision of R v Governor of South Australia, wherein the court inter alia described the governor-general as the "Constitutional Head of the Commonwealth" (and the Governor of South Australia as the "Constitutional Head of the State").

Internationally, for the purposes of protocol, the United Nations list of heads of state has for Australia "(His Majesty King Charles III)", in brackets, above the name and title of the Governor-General, "His Excellency General David John Hurley"; this is the same as is done for other Commonwealth realms with a governor-general. The United States Department of State in 2010 listed the Queen as head of state and the CIA currently refers to her successor as "chief of state". Canada's Department of Foreign Affairs and International Trade lists the names of both the monarch and the governor-general as head of state. The Queen's Royal Household in the United Kingdom has updated the way the term head of state is used in relation to Australia: in 1999, the British monarchy website was altered to replace the description of Elizabeth II as head of state of Australia with one that mentioned her only as "sovereign". In 2010, the "head of state" description was restored, but, by 2014, this had again been changed, with the Queen described as "Sovereign" in the Commonwealth realms, of which Australia is one. The monarch was described as "head of state" during King Charles III first royal tour of Australia.

=== Scholarly sources ===
Former governor-general and Liberal politician Sir Paul Hasluck stated in 1979 that Australia's monarch is the country's head of state and the governor-general is her or his representative. The same view has been expressed by former governor-general and legal scholar Sir Zelman Cowen. This position has been supported by many constitutional scholars, including Harrison Moore, George Winterton, and George Williams. Furthermore, George Winterton argued that, because the Governor-General only functions on a federal level, with Governors playing corresponding parts in the States, the Governor-General could not be the head of state for the nation as a whole.

Constitutional law academic Anne Twomey concludes that the monarch is the head of state, noting that the head of state is usually defined as the person holding "the highest ranking constitutional office in a country, in whom executive power is vested and to whom an Oath of Allegiance is commonly made". This is the case for the monarch. Additionally, as the governor-general is a representative of another person with a higher status, this means that they themselves cannot hold the highest ranking constitutional office. She concludes that this is the same position for all the other Commonwealth realms. Furthermore she concludes that the monarch "is regarded as Australia's head of state by the British Government, the Australian Government, the United Nations and most legal and constitutional experts, even though some of her most fervent supporters, for political reasons, still profess that she is not". Additionally, she notes that the monarch holds her office in relation to the nation as a whole, while the governor-general's powers are limited to only the federal level of government; the monarch being represented in the states by governors.

A paper by David Hamer, originally published by the Centre for Research in Public Sector Management at the University of Canberra, describes Australia as having two heads of state: the monarch, who is "the head of state" and performs a symbolic role; and the governor-general, who is "the constitutional head of state."

A founding member of the monarchist lobby group Australians for Constitutional Monarchy and former Justice of the High Court of Australia, Michael Kirby has long supported the view that the Queen is Australia's head of state. The same view was expressed by the former Chief Justice of the High Court, Sir Anthony Mason.

However, Professor Colin Howard argued that, "It seems therefore that practice and law now coincide to support the proposition that, certain matters of ceremony and courtesy apart, the head of state in Australia is not the Queen but the Governor-General". Professor Owen E. Hughes commented that there was "ambiguity" on the issue, and described both the monarch and the governor-general as the head of state at different times in the same book.

=== Political sources ===
Australians for Constitutional Monarchy has often argued that the governor-general is head of state. Sir David Smith, a former official secretary to five governors-general, holds that the governor-general is head of state, while the Queen is Australia's sovereign, since the constitution directs the governor-general, and not the monarch, to carry out the duties of head of state; and Professor David Flint, convenor of Australians for Constitutional Monarchy, feels the same way, believing the High Court's 1907 decision R v Governor of South Australia resolves the issue as a constitutional description. Professor Flint asserts that the term head of state is a diplomatic one and is governed by international law and notes that, as the governor-general is sent overseas and received as head of state, she is, under international law, a head of state. He says this has only become an issue because the republicans have been unable to raise other reasons to change the constitution, highlighting that it was argued nine times by the republicans in the official Yes/No booklet sent to voters in the referendum. However, in 1995, the one-time Director of Australians for Constitutional Monarchy, and later Liberal prime minister, Tony Abbott, described the Queen as the "titular Head of State" of Australia. In 1999, Sir William Deane, then governor-general, wrote to the Queen about Smith's claim. Writing a response on the Queen's behalf, Robert Fellowes, the private secretary to the Sovereign, asserted that Smith's claims "would not really hold constitutional water".

The Australian Monarchist League (AML) has said in an article that, "Monarchists Affirm – Queen is Head of State", National Chairman Phillip Benwell says this "has been advised in writing to me on several occasions by the Department of Prime Minister and Cabinet"

The view of the Australian Republican Movement is also consistent with official position. Leading republican and former prime minister, Malcolm Turnbull argued in 1993: "As long as we have the British Queen as our Head of State, other nations everywhere, not just in Asia, will regard us as somewhat less than independent."

In 2016, Turnbull, when he was the prime minister, expressed a different view: "The Australian government, the Australian people, were represented by our head of state, by the Governor-General, Peter Cosgrove, who is the highest office holder in our nation."

=== Media sources ===
Mainstream media sometimes uses the term head of state to describe the governor-general. A detailed editorial is from The Australian, prior to the Queen making a United Nations speech, saying:

[T]he Queen has reasserted her claim on the title "head of state" of Australia by using it in the announcement of her address to the UN in July ... In recent years, particularly after the debate and referendum on a republic in 1999, the local convention has been to recognise that the Governor-General is Australia's head of state and that Elizabeth II is our sovereign ... a spokesman for [Prime Minister] Rudd said: "Australia's head of state is HM Queen Elizabeth II, represented by the Governor-General HE Ms Quentin Bryce AC. The government is aware of the plan for the Queen to address the United Nations."

In international media, the Queen has been presented as Australia's head of state, and in some cases the term "British monarch" is used.

== Comparison with other Commonwealth realms ==
In some of the fifteen Commonwealth realms, the monarch is explicitly defined as the head of state. For example, section 2 of New Zealand's Constitution Act 1986 states: "The Sovereign in right of New Zealand is the head of State of New Zealand, and shall be known by the royal style and titles proclaimed from time to time." Likewise, in Part V of the Constitution of Papua New Guinea, the monarch is labelled Head of State of Papua New Guinea.

In Canada, some difference of opinion exists over whether the King of Canada or the Governor General of Canada should be considered the country's head of state; and there is some inconsistency among politicians, scholars, and the media in the application of the description to either individual. Canadian monarchists assert the King is head of state. The Canadian constitution does not use the term "head of state". However, it does state that: "The Executive Government and Authority of and over Canada is hereby declared to continue and be vested in the Queen."

The phrase "head of state" is not used in the constitutions of:

- Antigua and Barbuda
- Australia
- Belize
- Canada
- Grenada
- Jamaica
- Saint Kitts and Nevis
- Saint Lucia
- Saint Vincent and the Grenadines
- The Bahamas
- United Kingdom

The phrase "head of state", referring to the King, is used in the constitutions of:

- New Zealand
- Papua New Guinea
- Solomon Islands
- Tuvalu

== See also ==
- Constitutional history of Australia
- Republicanism in Australia
- Irish head of state from 1922 to 1949
