= Richard McGarvie =

Australian judge (1926–2003)

The Honourable Richard McGarvie AC, QC

24th Governor of Victoria
- In office 23 April 1992 – 23 April 1997
- Monarch: Elizabeth II
- Premier: Joan Kirner; Jeff Kennett
- Preceded by: Davis McCaughey
- Succeeded by: Sir James Gobbo

Personal details
- Born: 21 May 1926 Colac, Victoria
- Died: 24 May 2003 (aged 77) Caulfield, Victoria
- Spouse: Lesley McGarvie (née Kerr)
- Education: University of Melbourne
- Profession: Barrister, judge

Military service
- Allegiance: Australia
- Branch/service: Royal Australian Navy
- Years of service: 1944–1946
- Rank: Able Seaman
- Unit: HMAS Cerberus; HMAS Arunta
- Battles/wars: Second World War

Richard Elgin McGarvie, AC, QC (21 May 1926 – 24 May 2003) was a judge in the Supreme Court of Victoria from 1976 to 1992, and the 24th Governor of Victoria from 1992 to 1997.

== Early life ==
McGarvie was born and brought up on his parents' dairy farm at Pomborneit East in Victoria. After finishing first place at Camperdown High School, he entered the Royal Australian Navy in 1944, training at HMAS Cerberus and serving on the destroyer, HMAS Arunta. The Second World War ended before he saw active service. He served with the British Commonwealth Occupation Force in Japan and was discharged as an able seaman in 1946.

McGarvie joined the Australian Labor Party in 1949 and took a leading role in the dismissal of its Victorian socialist-left dominated Central Executive by bringing about federal intervention.

== Legal career ==
McGarvie studied law at the University of Melbourne and graduated in 1950, winning the Supreme Court Prize for the top honours student of the year. Joining the Victorian Bar in 1952, he became Queen's Counsel, chair of the Victorian Bar Council (1973–1975), Treasurer of Law Council of Australia (1974–1976), and Chancellor of La Trobe University (1981–1992).

McGarvie was appointed to the Supreme Court of Victoria on 1 June 1976, resigning all political affiliations, and served as a judge until 22 April 1992. He was appointed Governor of Victoria from 1992 to 1997.

== Constitutional influence ==
Author of the McGarvie Model, McGarvie was an appointed delegate to Constitutional Convention on an Australian republic in February 1998, and initiated the 2001 Corowa conference to find common ground among republicans after the referendum defeat in 1999. He took the unusual position of making contributions to republicanism, without directly supporting the broader republican movement. He promoted his own model and at the 1998 convention argued the provision for two-thirds parliamentary dismissal of a president was unworkable.

== See also ==
- Judiciary of Australia
- List of Judges of the Supreme Court of Victoria
- Process model (Australia)
- Victorian Bar Association

Government offices
Preceded by Davis McCaughey	Governor of Victoria; 1992–1997	Succeeded by Sir James Gobbo
Academic offices
Preceded by Sir Reginald Smithers	Chancellor of La Trobe University; 1980–1992	Succeeded by Nancy Millis
