= Direct election republican model (Australia) =

A direct election republican model is a proposal for Australian constitutional reform. If a proposal of this type were approved at a referendum, it would establish Australia as a republic with a head of state chosen directly by the Australian electorate.

While a directly elected president would be compatible with either a parliamentary or presidential system of government, typically when Australian republicans express support for "the direct-election model", support for the existing parliamentary system of government is usually implied. Supporters are envisaging a reform in which the Governor-General is replaced by a directly elected figurehead president and the Prime Minister of Australia remains the head of government.

== Important models in this class ==
There are many proposals by individuals or small groups for a direct-election model, however the following is a list of models in this class which have been canvassed through governmental institutions:

- RAC Popular Election model (1993)
- Gallop model by Geoff Gallop (1998)
- Hayden model by Bill Hayden (1998)
- ARM Model 4 - People elect the President (2001)
- ARM Model 5 - People choose from Parliament's List (2001)

== Rationale ==
If implemented, the model would establish an Australian Republic by removing constitutional links to the monarchy. References to either King or Governor-General in the Australian constitution would be replaced by a reference to the President of Australia. The resulting structure would be similar to other parliamentary republics where the President has very little or no discretionary power.

Supporters of the model say that, although elected, the change to a republic is argued to have minor but positive impact on the rest of Australia's parliament and government. The elected President would be a true figurehead for the Australian people. New provisions in the constitution could prevent the president from taking control of the government away from the prime minister.

== History ==
Direct election of the governor-general was considered in the conventions leading to the federation of Australia, however rarely revisited until the advent of the modern republican movement.

In 1993 direct-election was reviewed as one of four options by the Republic Advisory Committee, chaired by Malcolm Turnbull. A partial and complete codification of the reserve powers of this model were presented. Prime Minister Paul Keating rejected this option saying it would "constitute a very dramatic and undesirable change to a system which all of us agree has served us well"

Under Prime Minister John Howard, two models were closely examined and criticised at the 1998 constitutional convention. During voting, the Hayden model was first to be eliminated, however supporters of that model did not transfer all their support to the more popular Gallup model which was consequently next to be eliminated.

At the 1999 Australian republic referendum, many direct-election republicans voted NO and ensured the defeat of the bi-partisan appointment model.

After the defeat, the Australian Republican Movement changed tactic and presented six republic options, of which three involved direct-election. Model 4 was developed from the Hayden model and Model 5 was developed from the Gallop model. Model 6 proposes a directly elected executive president, which would not retain the existing parliamentary system.

The 2004 Republican Senate Inquiry included models 4 and 5 in a recommendation that a plebiscite be conducted offering five alternative methods of selecting a head of state. According to opinion polls, if such a plebiscite were held, electors would be more likely to support direct-election models over alternatives.

== See also ==
- Republicanism in Australia
