= Copernican paradigm =

Proposed model for an Australian republic

The Copernican paradigm is series of models for an Australian republic that suggest only replacing the King, whilst retaining the governor-general and state governors. It is named for Renaissance astronomer Nicolaus Copernicus.

== Background ==
Although a constitutional monarchy, in practice, Australia has most of the essential features of a federal republic. The modern objectives of Australian republicanism are usually viewed in terms of replacing monarchist institutions, in particular the governor-general, with republican institutions.

== Analysis ==
The paradigm focuses on the King of Australia being the central institution of the Australian constitutional system. It is from this central authority, that the executive authority of the governor-general and each state governor is legally derived.

== Model development ==
Proponents of this analysis argue that their perspective on Australian constitutional structures allows republicans to develop constitutional models that are simpler and with substantively less disruption to parliamentary government. Such models would focus on replacing the monarch alone, retaining the governor-general and state governors.

In replacing the monarch, a model based on the Copernican paradigm can accommodate a directly elected head of state without codification of the reserve powers, which currently may be exercised by the governor-general and state governors.

Professor George Winterton, noting this as advantageous, added the paradigm retains the nationally unifying element of a joint state-federal head of state.

== Criticism ==
In the report of the 2004 Senate Inquiry republican models based on the Copernican paradigm were criticised as understating the amount of constitutional change required to establish a republic. Senators queried the potential for duplication and confusion over the ceremonial roles of the Australian head of state and the governor-general.

Professor Winterton criticised the concept as "tricephalous" (three-headed) and potentially unstable. He argued a "locally-resident directly-elected public officer" was not readily comparable to a "hereditary absentee monarch" and a future head of state would interfere with the exercise of the governor-general's powers to some degree.

== See also ==
- McGarvie Model
- Australian republicanism
