= John Warhurst =

John Warhurst may refer to:

- John Warhurst (athlete)
- John Warhurst (academic)
- John Warhurst (sound editor)
