= Monarchism in Australia =

Movement supporting the continuation of the Australian monarchy

Monarchism in Australia is a movement supporting the continuation of the Australian monarchy, as opposed to republicanism. The largest monarchist organisations in the country are the Australian Monarchist League and the Australians for Constitutional Monarchy.

== History ==
Monarchism has existed in Australia since British colonisation began in 1788. In 1867 it was suggested that Australia should have its own resident monarch in the event that Australia became an independent country.

Monarchism was challenged in the 1990s as pro-republic sentiment grew, culminating in the 1999 Australian republic referendum to determine whether Australia should become a republic. Monarchists campaigned on the "No" side, arguing that the constitutional monarchy was functional, and warned a republican victory would result in a "politician's republic". The 1999 referendum was ultimately rejected 54% to 45%, which many regarded as an endorsement of the status quo by the general public.

== Types of monarchism ==
=== Status quo monarchism ===
Status-quo monarchists support Australia continuing to share a monarch with the United Kingdom, and the monarch continuing to be represented by a governor-general. Both the Australian Monarchist League and Australians for Constitutional Monarchy support this position.

=== Alternative monarchism ===
A far less prominent form of monarchism in Australia is alternative monarchism. Alternative monarchists support Australia having a resident Australian monarch and abolishing the role of governor-general of Australia. The proposition was first published in 1867.

Alan Atkinson, in his 1993 book The Muddle Headed Republic, advocated for the creation of an Australian royal family, "through the re-location of one of the minor royals to serve as head of state".

In 2009, Harry Meklonian argued for an Australian monarch to be elected by the people, replacing the UK monarchy and abolishing the governor-general position. In 2010, Richard Hughes similarly suggested that Prince Harry emigrate to Australia to be appointed as an Australian monarch and head of state.

In 2022, Waleed Aly promoted the idea of replacing the monarch with a life appointed Indigenous "First Elder". Another possibility would be to crown someone in the line of succession to the Australian throne, but who is not expected to become monarch by the present rules of succession.
