= Republic Advisory Committee =

Australian committee

The Republic Advisory Committee was a committee established by Australian Prime Minister Paul Keating in April 1993 to examine the constitutional and legal issues that would arise were Australia to become a republic.

== Description ==
The committee's mandate was to "prepare an options paper describing 'the minimum constitutional changes necessary to achieve a viable Federal Republic of Australia, maintaining the effect of our current conventions and principles of government'." The committee was asked to consider issues such as:

- a name for a new elected head of state;
- the method of selection for the head of state;
- what powers he or she should possess;
- the constitutional amendments and legal changes required to replace the Queen of Australia and Her Representative, the Governor-General of Australia by an elected head of state.

== Republic Advisory Committee membership ==
The members appointed to the committee on 28 April 1993 were:

Name	Notes
Malcolm Turnbull	Chairman (Australian republican campaigner and future Prime Minister)
Nick Greiner	Former New South Wales Premier
John Hirst	La Trobe University, Convenor of the Australian Republic Movement
Mary Kostakidis	media presenter, SBS TV; member, Constitutional Centenary Foundation
Lowitja O'Donoghue	Chair, Aboriginal & Torres Strait Islander Commission
Susan Ryan	Former Labor Party senator & Education Minister
George Winterton	Professor of Law, University of New South Wales

The Republic Advisory Committee submitted two Volumes (Volume I - The Options and Volume II - the Appendices) to the Australian prime minister in late 1993. Part of Volume II was concerned with the international experience in moving from monarchical to republican headships of state. Six international reports were commissioned from local experts; four of the countries were former Commonwealth monarchies, while two had experienced their own regime change when their own monarchies (the Hohenzollerns in Germany, the Habsburgs in Austria) were replaced by republics.

== Reports commissioned by the Republic Advisory Committee ==
Country	Report by	Qualifications
Austria	Professor Bernhard Raschauer	Professor, Institute for Public and Administrative Law, University of Vienna
Germany	Professor Klaus Von Beyme	Professor of Political Science, University of Heidelberg
India	A.G. Noorani	Formerly at Centre for Policy Research, New Delhi, now working as a freelance journalist
Ireland	Jim Duffy	Author of major study on the Presidency of Ireland and political commentator/analyst
Mauritius	Madun Gujadhur	Barrister at the English, Indian & Mauritian bars and chairman of the Mauritian Law Reform Commission
Trinidad and Tobago	Sir Ellis Clarke	Former Governor-General of Trinidad and Tobago, who went on to serve as its first president

The recommendations made by the committee were never voted on by the Australian people. A Constitutional Convention was held in 1998, resulting in a slightly different proposal which was rejected by the Australian electorate in the 1999 referendum.

== Additional information ==
Copies of the Reports were published under the following ISBNs

Volume One - The Options	ISBN 0-644-32590-9
Volume Two - The Appendices	ISBN 0-644-32589-5

== See also ==
- Republicanism in Australia
- Bi-partisan appointment republican model
- Direct election republican model
