= James Gobbo =

Australian judge and Governor of Victoria (1931–2021)

The Honourable Sir James Gobbo AC, CVO, QC

25th Governor of Victoria
- In office 24 April 1997 – 31 December 2000
- Monarch: Elizabeth II
- Premier: Jeff Kennett; Steve Bracks
- Lieutenant: Adrienne Clarke
- Preceded by: Richard McGarvie
- Succeeded by: John Landy

Personal details
- Born: Giacomo Augustine Gobbo; 22 March 1931 Carlton, Victoria, Australia
- Died: 7 November 2021 (aged 90)
- Spouse: Shirley Lewis
- Relations: Nicola Gobbo (niece)
- Education: University of Melbourne; University of Oxford
- Occupation: Jurist

Sir James Augustine Gobbo, AC, CVO, QC (22 March 1931 – 7 November 2021) was an Australian jurist who served as the 25th Governor of Victoria, from 1997 to 2000.

== Family and early life ==
James Gobbo was born in Carlton, Victoria, on 22 March 1931, to Italian parents Antonio and Regina. In March 1935 the family returned to Cittadella, Padua, Italy, where a sister, Natalina, was born shortly after. Three years later the family, which also included a brother, Flavio, arrived back in Australia to take up permanent residency in North Melbourne, Victoria. Gobbo, then aged seven, spoke no English at the time of his return. His father, who had started a café, felt the time was right for him to receive a Catholic education.

Gobbo's early schooling included St Mary's Primary School, West Melbourne and later St Joseph's CBC, North Melbourne. In 1944 he was accepted into Xavier College. He was a member of the Xavier College crew that won the 1948 Associated Public Schools Head of the River. After leaving Xavier College, he studied law at the University of Melbourne, where he lived at Newman College. In 1951 he was awarded a Rhodes Scholarship, following which he attained a Master of Arts degree at Magdalen College, University of Oxford.

In 1957 Gobbo married former librarian Shirley Lewis, and had five children. His son, James Gobbo Jr., was the Liberal candidate for the district of Bentleigh in the 2006 Victorian state election.

== Judicial career ==
After many years as a barrister and later as a Queen's Counsel, Gobbo was appointed a judge of the Supreme Court of Victoria. He served from 18 July 1978 until he retired from the bench on 14 February 1994.

== Vice-regal career ==
Gobbo served as Lieutenant-Governor of Victoria from 1995 until he was appointed Governor of Victoria in 1997 by Queen Elizabeth II on the advice of the Victorian premier, Jeff Kennett. He was the first Australian state governor of Italian descent.

Gobbo's term of office was to be shorter than the usual five years, due to the uncertain outcome of the looming 1999 Australian republic referendum. If a republic had come into effect, then the governorship of Victoria would have been abolished from 1 January 2001. In August 2000 the new premier, Steve Bracks, announced that Gobbo's successor would be John Landy, who would take up his post in January 2001. Gobbo immediately made it known that he had had an understanding with Kennett for an extension of his term beyond 2000, and expressed deep disappointment that this was not now to occur. However, this understanding must have been private, since Kennett's letter of appointment stated that any extension beyond 31 December 2000 would be a matter for the premier of the day. Bracks said that he had no knowledge of any such understanding.

After leaving office, Gobbo took up the position of Commissioner for Italy for the Victorian government until June 2006, and continued on various boards and councils.

In 2006, Gobbo was the Chair of the Council of the National Library of Australia, the Council of the Order of Australia and Chair of the Australian Multicultural Foundation.

== Honours ==
Gobbo was appointed a Knight Bachelor in the 1982 New Year Honours; a Companion of the Order of Australia (AC) in 1993; and a Knight of Grace of the Most Venerable Order of the Hospital of St John of Jerusalem in 1997. He was awarded the Centenary Medal in 2001 and was also a Knight of Malta.

== Death ==
Gobbo died on 7 November 2021 at the age of 90.

== See also ==
- Judiciary of Australia
- List of Judges of the Supreme Court of Victoria
- Victorian Bar Association

Government offices
Preceded by Richard McGarvie	Governor of Victoria; 1997–2000	Succeeded by John Landy
Preceded by Sir John Young	Lieutenant-Governor of Victoria; 1995–1997	Succeeded by Adrienne Clarke
