= Constitution Place, Canberra =

Park in Canberra, Australia

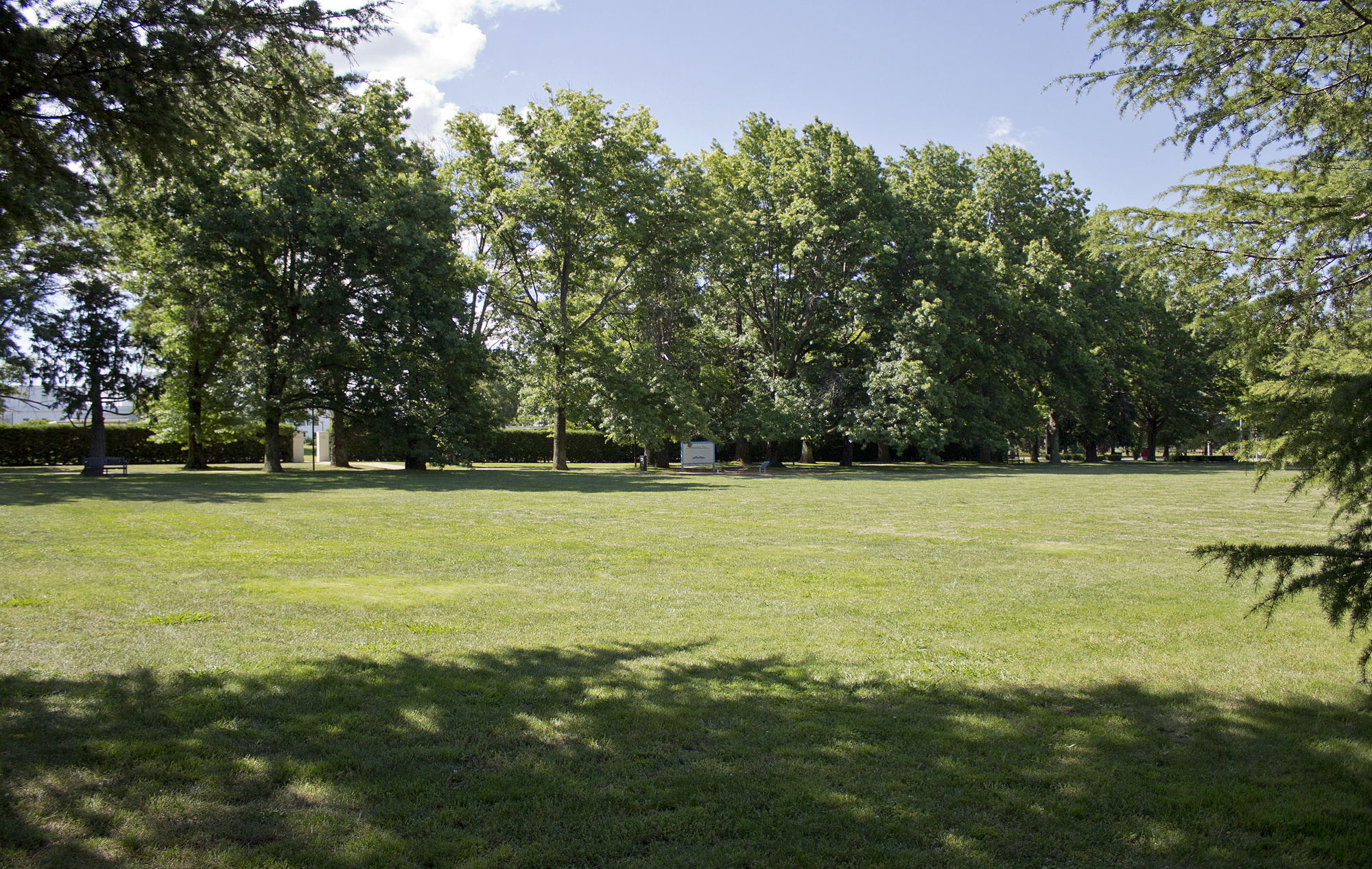
- Constitution Place, Canberra
- Interactive map of Constitution Place, Canberra
- Location: Parkes, Australian Capital Territory
- Coordinates: 35.304°S 149.132°E

Constitution Place is a park in Canberra, the capital of Australia. The area was named in February 1998 by Prime Minister of Australia John Howard during the course of the Fourth Constitutional Convention on the options for an Australian republic. The park is located to the south-east of Old Parliament House and adjoining the Old Parliament House Gardens and nearby to the National Archives of Australia. It is semicircular in shape, with curved road frontages on King George Terrace, Walpole Crescent and Queen Victoria Terrace. There is also a windbreak of trees, which were planted by Charles Weston as superintendent of parks and gardens in Canberra.

The focal point of the park is an information board, seat and unveiling plaque.

Constitution Place is also the name of a mixed-use city block (including an ACT Government office building) at the end of Constitution Avenue in Civic, designed by Bates Smart and opened in 2021.
