= John Hirst (historian) =

Australian historian

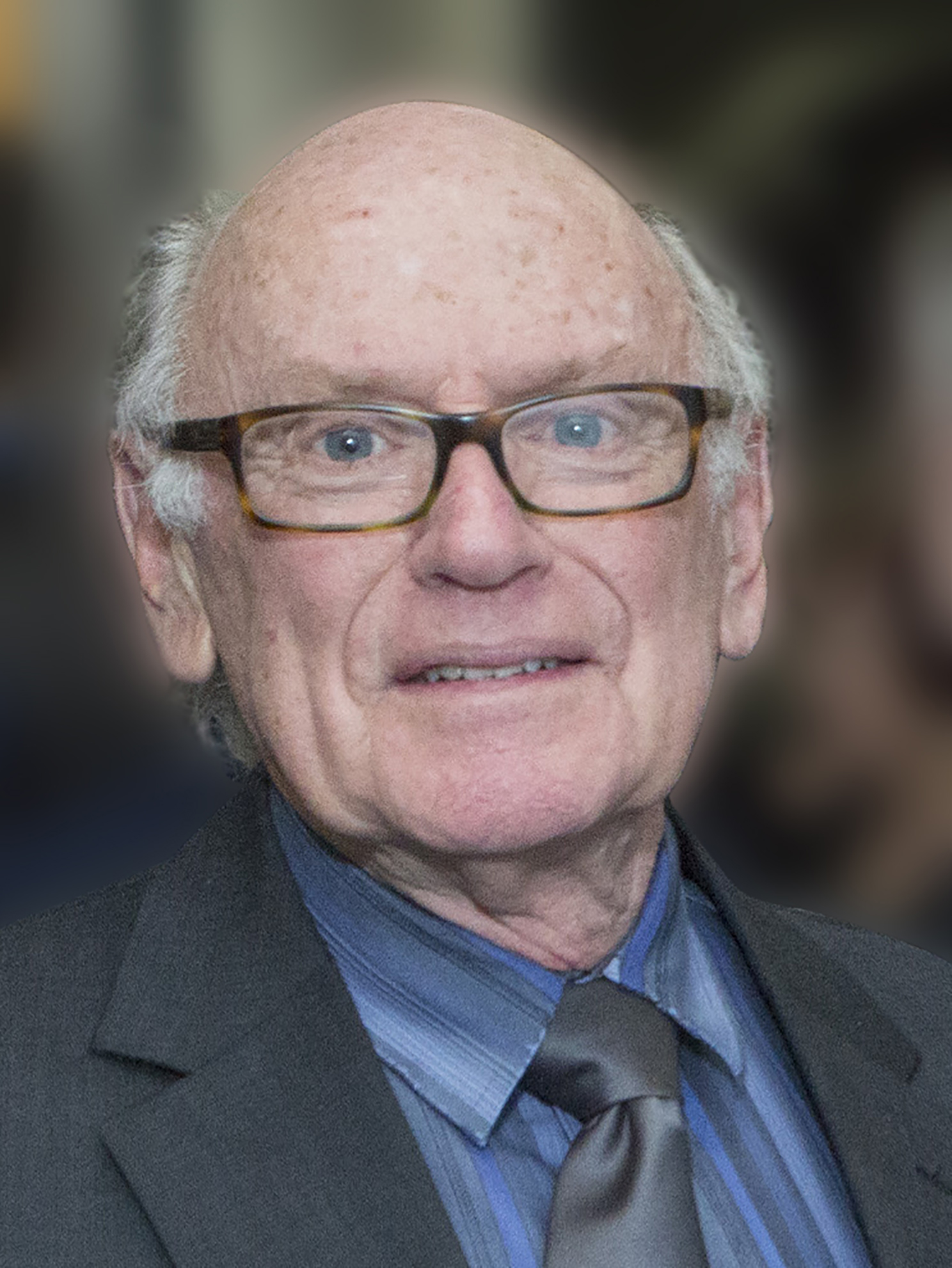
- Born: 9 July 1942; Adelaide, South Australia
- Died: 3 February 2016 (aged 73); Melbourne, Victoria
- Awards: Fellow of the Academy of the Social Sciences in Australia (1986)

Academic background
- Education: University of Adelaide (BA, PhD)
- Thesis: 'Adelaide and the Country, 1870–1914: A Study of their Social and Political Relationship' (1970)

Academic work
- Institutions: La Trobe University
- Main interests: Australian history Political history

John Bradley Hirst, FASSA (9 July 1942 – 3 February 2016) was an Australian historian and social commentator. He taught at La Trobe University from 1968 until his retirement in 2006, edited Historical Studies—Australia's leading historical journal—from 1977 to 1980, and also served on the boards of Film Australia and the National Museum of Australia. He has been described as a "historian, public intellectual, and active citizen". He wrote widely on Australian history and society, publishing two well-received books about colonial New South Wales. Hirst also frequently published opinion pieces in the media.

== Biography ==
Born in Adelaide, Hirst attended Unley High School and undertook his undergraduate and postgraduate study at the University of Adelaide. Abandoning an early desire to become a Methodist minister, in 1968 he was appointed a lecturer at Melbourne's new La Trobe University, where he remained until the end of his career. His wife and fellow-student Christine accompanied him to Melbourne. They had two children, Catherine and David. Hirst was subsequently head of department and Reader in History at La Trobe. He retired in 2006, and was an emeritus Scholar at La Trobe until his death. Hirst was seconded to the University of Melbourne to edit Historical Studies, Australia's leading historical journal, from 1977 to 1980. In retirement, he travelled regularly to Sydney to instruct, without remuneration, groups of post-graduate students in thesis writing. Hirst died on 3 February 2016 at the age of 73.

== Academic contribution ==
Hirst's career included "teaching, supervision and research. He developed new subjects and methodologies to teach them." He produced a large number of articles, chapters and books on Australian history. His academic interests were wide-ranging, including social, cultural and political history. Jeremy Sammut has described him as "an elegant and outstanding stylist, as adept at clarifying complex issues by reducing them to their essentials as he was at crafting the pithy line that eliminated all doubt his interpretation was true and correct". In his historical work, Hirst's colleague at La Trobe University, Alan Frost, has noted that Hirst "challenged orthodoxies and produced many new insights". A major achievement of Hirst's was a project to index the Melbourne Argus newspaper (1860–1909).

Hirst wrote two seminal books on colonial New South Wales which Frank Bongiorno has described as displaying "a raw intellectual power": Convict Society and its Enemies (1983) and The Strange Birth of Colonial Democracy (1988) (both reprinted as Freedom on the Fatal Shore in 2008). Convict Society and its Enemies was particularly influential, arguing that rather than being a brutal slave society, early New South Wales was a place where rights and freedoms were well-established from the beginning and where the British convicts had opportunities for advancement.

Hirst's study of Australian Federation, The Sentimental Nation, was also a ground-breaking work, arguing that national sentiment was more important than economics in uniting the Australian colonies. Alan Frost has described Hirst's shorter analyses as notable: "Distance in Australia: Was It a Tyrant?" (1975), his response to Geoffrey Blainey's most famous concept, "deserves much more attention than it now receives"; "Egalitarianism" (1986) challenges "received wisdom about colonial life". Many of his best shorter pieces were collected in Sense and Nonsense in Australian History (2009).

In addition to those concerning Australian history, Hirst developed a pioneering course designed to inform students about Australia's European cultural heritage. Hirst argued that:

"Since Australia is an outgrowth of England, European civilisation is also the field of study for an intelligible history of Australia. This does not mean that every history of Australia has to begin with Charlemagne. It does mean that Australian history not set within European civilisation will convey a very poor understanding of Australian society."

Hirst turned his series of lectures on European history into a book, The Shortest History of Europe. First published in 2009, the book has been translated into twelve languages (Italian, Finnish, Swedish, Greek, Chinese, Arabic, Spanish, German, Portuguese, Russian, Turkish and Korean). His last work was a similar encapsulation of Australian history in one short volume, Australian History in Seven Questions.

== Public intellectual ==
Historian Frank Bongiorno described Hirst as a "creative historian capable of engaging a wide audience, as well as a public intellectual who delighted, infuriated and provoked". He contributed many opinion pieces and commentaries to Australian newspapers and journals. Jeremy Sammut has noted that Hirst was motivated by an independent mind and a distaste for unthinking conformity. He "defied simplistic categorisation as a partisan because his politics were idiosyncratic". Sammut wrote Hirst was committed to "the rigorous pursuit of historical truth that drove him to explore the deeper patterns and meanings of the past, and the contemporary implications, that others had missed or misled us about". Hirst described himself as an old-fashioned social democrat.

== Public appointments ==
Hirst held a number of appointments during his career. He was a member of the Prime Minister's Republic Advisory Committee, the chair of the Commonwealth Civics Education Group, a member of the Film Australia Board, a council member of the National Museum of Australia, and a member of the board of Old Parliament House in Canberra. He wrote the official history of Australia for new citizens and took a prominent part in the history summit convened by Prime Minister John Howard in 2006. Hirst advised the Victorian Government on the school history curriculum and was history adviser to the National Curriculum Authority. He was elected to the Academy of the Social Sciences in Australia in 1986. A committed republican, Hirst was the Convenor of the Republican Movement in Victoria.

== Bibliography ==
- Hirst, John (1973). Adelaide and the country, 1870–1917 : their social and political relationship. Carlton, Victoria: Melbourne University Press.
- — (1983). Convict Society and Its Enemies: A History of Early New South Wales. Sydney: George Allen & Unwin. ISBN 9780868613499.
- — (1988). The Strange Birth of Colonial Democracy: New South Wales, 1848–1884. North Sydney: Allen & Unwin. ISBN 9780195506204.
- — (1992). The World of Albert Facey. Sydney: History Institute of Victoria in association with Allen & Unwin. ISBN 9781863731614.
- — (1994). A Republican Manifesto. Melbourne: Oxford University Press. ISBN 0195536495.
- — (1998). Discovering Democracy: A Guide to Government and Law in Australia. Carlton South, Victoria: Curriculum Corporation. ISBN 1863664319.
- — (2001). The Sentimental Nation: The Making of the Australian Commonwealth. Melbourne: Oxford University Press. ISBN 9780195506204.
- — (2003). Australia's Democracy: A Short History. Crows Nest, New South Wales: Allen & Unwin. ISBN 9781865088457.
- — (2005). 'Kangaroo Court': Family Law in Australia. Melbourne: Black Inc. ISBN 9781863953412.
- — (2006). Sense and Nonsense in Australian History. Melbourne: Black Inc. ISBN 9780975076996.
- — (2007). The Australians: Insiders and Outsiders on the National Character since 1770. Melbourne: Black Inc. ISBN 9781863954082.
- — (2009). The Shortest History of Europe. Melbourne: Black Inc. ISBN 9781863954396.
- — (2010). Looking for Australia: Historical Essays. Melbourne: Black Inc. ISBN 9781863954860.
- — (2014). Australian History in 7 Questions. Carlton, Victoria: Black Inc. ISBN 9781863956703.
- — (2015). Australia's Catholic University: The First Twenty-Five Years. North Sydney: Australian Catholic University. ISBN 9781922097293.
- Graeme Davison; John Hirst; Stuart Macintyre, eds. (2001). The Oxford Companion to Australian History. Melbourne: Oxford University Press. ISBN 019551503X.

=== Critical studies and reviews of Hirst's work ===
- McKenna, Mark (August 2014). "Untitled review of Australian history in 7 questions". Noted. The Monthly. 103: 56.
