= Constitutional history of Australia =

The Constitutional history of Australia is the history of Australia's foundational legal principles. Australia's legal origins as a nation state began in the colonial era, with the reception of English law and the lack of any regard to existing Indigenous legal structures. As the colonies expanded, Australia gradually began to achieve de facto independence. Over the years as a result the foundations of the Australian legal system gradually began to shift. This culminated in the Australia Act, an act formally ending legal ties with the UK.

== Settlement ==
Prior to European settlement of Australia, Europeans had been to the land merely as explorers. The only exception was James Cook who in 1770 sailed up most of the east coast of Australia and then claimed the entire coastline he had just explored as British territory. No formal legal justification was made of the claim at the time, but in any event no regard was given to any potential Indigenous legal rights.

Orders-in-Council were issued in London on 6 December 1785 for the establishment of a colony in Botany Bay. Arthur Phillip was appointed Governor-designate of the new colony in October 1786. In Phillip's commission, the boundary was defined as the 135th meridian east longitude (135° east), (26 January 1788 – Map) taking the line from Melchisédech Thévenot's chart, Hollandia Nova‒‒Terre Australe, published in Relations de Divers Voyages Curieux (Paris, 1663).

Soon after Lord Sydney appointed him governor, Phillip drew up a detailed memorandum of his plans for the proposed new colony. In one paragraph he wrote: "The laws of this country [England] will of course, be introduced in [New] South Wales, and there is one that I would wish to take place from the moment his Majesty's forces take possession of the country: That there can be no slavery in a free land, and consequently no slaves." European settlement commenced with the arrival of the First Fleet, comprising 11 ships which arrived at Botany Bay, New South Wales between 18 and 20 January 1788. The Fleet brought a total of 1044 people to the new settlement, of whom 696 were convicts. The actual settlement was located at Sydney Cove. The colony was formally proclaimed by Governor Phillip on 7 February 1788 at Sydney. Though the settlement was a military prison, and Phillip had full power as governor, the colony also had a civil administration and courts of law.

The application of English law to the Indigenous population remained unsettled however. In R v Tommy an Aboriginal man was found liable under law for the murder of a colonist. Later, in the case of R v Ballard the court held it did not have the jurisdiction to convict an Aboriginal man of murdering another Aboriginal man as English law did not apply to them. However, this judgment was implicitly overturned in the case of R v Murrel, where the court held that Aboriginal people had no law and could be convicted for the murder of each other.

In 1835, Governor Bourke proclaimed that Indigenous Australians could not sell or assign land, nor could an individual person or group acquire land, other than through distribution by the Crown. The proclamation was approved by the Colonial Office on 10 October 1835. The proclamation was issued in response to the attempt by graziers from Van Diemen's Land to enter into an agreement with indigenous tribes in Port Philip, known as Batman's Treaty.

During the 19th century, separate British colonies were formed in Australia. In 1825, Tasmania, named Van Diemen's Land, was proclaimed a separate colony from the colony of New South Wales. The Swan River Colony of Western Australia was established in 1832, separately from that of New South Wales, effectively taking over by Britain of the remainder of the Australian continent. Following the Treaty of Waitangi, William Hobson declared British sovereignty over New Zealand in 1840 and was part of the colony of New South Wales. In 1841, it was separated from the colony of New South Wales to form the new Colony of New Zealand. South Australia was formed in 1836 separately of the colony of New South Wales, and Victoria in 1851 and Queensland in 1859 both from the colony of New South Wales. By Letters Patent on 6 June 1859, Queen Victoria gave her approval to the separation of the colony of Queensland from New South Wales. On the same day an Order-in-Council gave Queensland its own Constitution. Queensland became a self-governing colony with its own Governor, a nominated Legislative Council and an elected Legislative Assembly. South Australia was founded as a "free province"—it was never a penal colony. Victoria and Western Australia were also founded "free", but later accepted transported convicts. A campaign by the settlers of New South Wales led to the end of convict transportation to that colony; the last convict ship arrived in 1848.

== Responsible government ==
Between 1855 and 1890, the six colonies individually gained responsible government, managing most of their own affairs while remaining part of the British Empire. The Colonial Office in London retained control of some matters, notably foreign affairs, defence, and international shipping. New Zealand achieved responsible government in 1853, New South Wales and Victoria in 1855, Tasmania in 1856, Queensland in 1859 (separated from New South Wales in that year with self-government from the beginning) and Western Australia in 1890. These arrangements were confirmed by the Colonial Laws Validity Act 1865.

The Colonial Laws Validity Act 1865 was a British Act of Parliament to define the relationship between local ("colonial") and British ("imperial") legislation. It confirmed that colonial legislation was to have full effect within the colony, limited only to the extent that it was not in contradiction with ("repugnant to") any Imperial Act which extended to that colony. The Act had the effect of clarifying and strengthening the position of colonial legislatures, while at the same time restating their ultimate subordination to the British Parliament.

Until the passage of the Act, a number of colonial statutes had been struck down by local judges on the grounds of repugnancy to English laws (whether or not those English laws had been intended by Parliament to be effective in the colony). This had been a particular problem for the government in South Australia, where Justice Benjamin Boothby had struck down local statutes on numerous occasions in the colony's Supreme Court.

== Towards federation ==
The first formal steps to federation of the colonies was in the form of the Federal Council of Australasia in 1885. However, the council was a weak non-executive, non-legislative federation of Western Australia, Fiji, Queensland, Tasmania and Victoria. The movement for full federation developed in the late 19th century, culminating in the six Australian colonies forming a federation of States. It was envisaged that New Zealand might also join.

In the 1890s, two constitutional conventions were called, which ultimately adopted a constitution based on a combination of British, American and other models (monarchy and parliamentary government from Britain, federalism from Canada and the United States, the use of the referendum from Switzerland). This constitution was then approved by the voters in each of the six colonies. (At the time women had the vote in only one of them: South Australia, and Aboriginal Australians in South Australia and Queensland only).

It was then passed (with an amendment allowing for some appeals to the Privy Council in London) as an Act of the British Parliament: the Commonwealth of Australia Constitution Act 1900. The Act entered into force on 1 January 1901, at which point the Commonwealth of Australia came into being.

The Australian Constitution, besides other matters, dealt with the allocation of powers between the colonies, which became states, and the federal parliament. Most of the powers, including those of foreign affairs and defence, were concurrent powers, with the proviso that if there was a conflict between the federal and a state law, then the federal law "will prevail". But the United Kingdom still had the power to engage in foreign affairs on behalf of Australia, and to make laws for it. In the early years Australia continued to be represented by the United Kingdom as part of the British Empire at international conferences. In 1919, following Canadian lead, Australian Prime Minister Billy Hughes insisted that Australia have separate representatives at the Versailles Peace Conference and not as part of the British delegation.

The Constitution provided that the British monarch be represented in Australia by a Governor-General. Originally, appointments were made on the advice of the British, not the Australian, government, and was generally a British aristocrat. In 1930, the Australian government insisted that Australian-born Isaac Isaacs be appointed. The British government very reluctantly accepted the Australian position that such appointments be made on the advice of the Australian government.

Finally, the Constitution provided that any law of the Australian Parliament could be disallowed within a year by the British monarch (acting on the advice of British ministers), though this power was never in fact exercised. In summary, the constitutional position of the Commonwealth as a whole in relation to the United Kingdom was, originally, the same as that of the individual colonies before federation.

== From a united imperial Crown to a shared monarch ==
A fundamental change in the constitutional structures of the British Commonwealth (formerly the British Empire, and not to be confused with the Commonwealth of Australia) did occur, however, in the late 1920s. Under the British Royal and Parliamentary Titles Act 1927, which implemented a decision of an earlier Commonwealth conference, the unified Crown that had heretofore been the centre point of the Empire was replaced by multiple crowns worn by a shared monarch.

Before 1927, King George V reigned as king in Australia, New Zealand, Canada, the Irish Free State, South Africa, etc., each of these states, in effect, as dominions, amounting to a subset of the United Kingdom. After 1927, he reigned as King of Australia, New Zealand, Canada, Ireland, South Africa, etc.

The form of use in the royal title as issued by King George V did not mention the dominions by name, except 'Ireland', which changed from being referred to as Great Britain and Ireland to Great Britain, Ireland, indicating that it was no longer part of the United Kingdom, but a separate state of which the monarch was now directly the head, rather than through linkage with Great Britain. Though unnamed, except through reference to the 'British Dominions beyond the Seas', the ground-breaking move shattered the previous concept of the shared monarch to one of multiple monarchies, all held by the one monarch.

Though this principle was implicit in the Act and in the King's new titles, and came out of a Commonwealth Conference, neither the British government nor the dominion governments seemed initially to grasp its significance. So while the Irish immediately put the principle into effect by assuming the right to select their own governor-general and to demand a direct right of audience with the King (excluding British ministers), other dominions were much slower to go down this path, and when they did so, they were faced with determined, though ultimately futile, attempts to block such evolution in London.

Whereas before 1927, it was correct in law to talk about the British monarch reigning in the dominions, after 1927, there was technically a King of Australia, etc., even if that title was never used formally, with the only link being that that monarch was also monarch of the UK and resident outside the Commonwealth of Australia. Curiously, while the Irish asserted the title King of Ireland by having King George V sign an international treaty on behalf of his Irish realm as early as 1931 (where he was formally advised by the Irish Minister for External Affairs who formally attended His Majesty, with no British minister present), the formal title Queen of Australia was only adopted through the Royal Style and Titles Act 1973.

== Statute of Westminster 1931 ==
By the mid-1920s, it was accepted by the British government that dominions would have full legislative autonomy. This was given legislative effect in 1931 by the Statute of Westminster 1931. The Statute took effect in Australia in 1942 with the passing of the Statute of Westminster Adoption Act 1942, with retroactive effect to 3 September 1939, the start of World War II. The adoption of the Statute repealed the application of the Colonial Laws Validity Act 1865 in relation to federal legislation. However, the Colonial Laws Validity Act 1865 continued to have application in individual Australian states until the Australia Act 1986 came into effect in 1986.

Following the Statute of Westminster, even though it was not yet adopted in Australia, a UK parliament joint select committee refused to implement the result of the 1933 Western Australian secession referendum as such a change did not have the support of the Australian government or parliament.

== Crisis in 1975 ==
The elections of the Australian Labor Party in 1972 and 1974 under its leader Gough Whitlam forced several constitutional issues to be tested. For two weeks in 1972, the Government had only two ministers, Whitlam and Lance Barnard. Although it had a majority in the lower House, the ALP faced a hostile Senate, and the defeat of Government bills led to a double dissolution and a consequent joint sitting and the passing of the bills into law as allowed under section 57. The political situation however was not improved much by the 1974 election, and the Senate later failed to provide "supply" (i.e. to pass tax and expenditure acts). The resulting Australian constitutional crisis of 1975 raised a series of issues:

- Must a State Governor appoint a party's nomination as a replacement in the Senate?
- Should the Senate refuse supply or refuse to discuss supply?
- Should the Prime Minister resign in such a situation?
- If he does not, should the Governor-General dismiss him?
- How can the Governor-General and Prime Minister have a sensible discussion when each is able to have the other dismissed immediately provided that the other has not already acted?

Of these, only the first has been partly resolved; an amendment in 1977 changed the procedure for casual appointment. While the State Parliaments can still require a state Governor to appoint somebody who is not the party's nominee, by stripping that nominee of their party membership the party can deny them appointment to the Senate. Under Section 11 of the Constitution a State parliament can still refuse to appoint the party's nominee; in this case, a stand-off can develop where the vacancy goes unfilled. This occurred in 1987, when the Tasmanian state parliament refused to appoint the Labor Party's nominee for a casual vacancy.

Two time-honoured constitutional principles were in conflict during the crisis. The first is that a ministry drawn from the majority of the lower house may continue to govern until it has lost the confidence of the House. The second is that a ministry may not continue to govern once supply has been exhausted. The potential of conflict has been resolved in the United Kingdom, where the House of Lords no longer has the power to block money bills. To date it has not been resolved in Australia. The crisis of 1975 may be repeated in the future, though it is unlikely.

== The Australia Act ==
The power under the Statute of Westminster to request the British Parliament to make laws for Australia was used on several occasions, primarily to enable Australia to acquire new territories. But its most significant use was also its last. This was when the procedure was used to pass the Australia Act 1986. The Australia Act effectively terminated the ability of the British Parliament or Government to make laws for Australia or its States, even at their request; and provided that any law which was previously required to be passed by the British Parliament on behalf of Australia could now be passed by Australia and its States by themselves.

Since the Australia Act, the only remaining constitutional link with the United Kingdom (if it is one) is in the person of the monarch (see Monarchy of Australia). But even that connection may not be automatic. In an important constitutional case (Sue v Hill (1999) 163 ALR 648), three justices of the High Court of Australia (the ultimate court of appeal) expressed the view that if the British Parliament were to alter the law of succession to the throne, such a change could not have any effect on the monarchy in Australia, because of the Australia Act: succession to the throne would continue in Australia according to the existing rule, unless and until that was altered in Australia. None of the other four justices in that case disagreed with this reasoning. (Because it was not strictly necessary to decide the case at hand, this is not strictly a binding judicial determination; but it is almost certainly correct given the precedent of the Abdication Crisis of 1936.)

The same case decided (and on this point the decision is binding) that the United Kingdom is a "foreign power" within the meaning of the Constitution, and therefore that holders of British citizenship are ineligible for election to the Federal Parliament (though a special "grandfathering" arrangement merely phases out the right of British citizens to vote).

== See also ==
- Australian constitutional law
- Constitutional law
- Constitutional convention
- Referendums in Australia

== Bibliography ==
- Davison, Graeme; Hirst, John; Macintyre, Stuart (1998). The Oxford Companion to Australian History. Melbourne: Oxford University Press. ISBN 0-19-553597-9.
