= George Winterton =

Australian legal scholar

- Born: 15 December 1946; British Hong Kong
- Died: 6 November 2008 (aged 61); Sydney, New South Wales, Australia
- Resting place: Waverley Cemetery, New South Wales, Australia
- Education: BA LLB LLM (UWA), JSD (Columbia)
- Occupation: Academic
- Years active: 1968–2008
- Known for: Australian constitutional lawyer and teacher, architect of the Winterton model for an Australian Republic
- Title: Professor of Constitutional Law, University of Sydney
- Predecessor: None
- Successor: Peter Gerangelos

George Graham Winterton (15 December 1946 – 6 November 2008) was an Australian academic specialising in Australian constitutional law. Winterton taught for 28 years at the University of New South Wales before taking up an appointment of Professor of Constitutional Law at the University of Sydney in 2004.

Winterton served as a member of the Executive Government Advisory Committee of the Constitutional Commission from 1985 to 1987.

== Early life ==
Winterton was born in Hong Kong on 15 December 1946. His parents, Rita and Walter, had married in Hong Kong after fleeing Austria shortly after the 1938 Nazi invasion. His father practised medicine in Japanese-occupied Hong Kong and, in May 1947, he and his family sailed to London on the MV Lorenz. Walter having gained an English medical qualification, the Wintertons left Britain in 1948, arriving in Australia in November where Walter became a general practitioner in Western Australia, first at Pingelly then Mount Hawthorn and then, after the birth of George's only sibling, Peter, at Tuart Hill from 1953. George attended the local primary schools until 1958 when he started at Hale School, then in West Perth.

== Education and early legal practice ==
In 1968, George graduated with first class honours in law from the University of Western Australia. He had won four prizes, and was placed first in his final year. Winterton later completed a master's degree by research in 1970, on the topic of the appropriations power under the Australian Constitution.

On graduation, Winterton became an articled clerk with the firm of Robinson Cox (now Clayton Utz) and was admitted to practice in Western Australia in 1970. From 1971 to 1973, he practised with the firm Frank Unmack and Cullen in Fremantle.

Winterton's academic career began in 1968 when he served as a visiting tutor at the University of Western Australia.

== Foundation of the Aboriginal Legal Service in Western Australia ==
The Chief Justice of Australia, Robert French, wrote of the early 1970s "when we were involved with other Perth lawyers in establishing an Aboriginal Legal Service of Western Australia":

"George played a leading role, and in 1972 was chairman of the committee that became the service. In that year he sent a letter to the then Coalition government asking for a modest grant to establish a duty counsel service. The election intervened."

"The response, when it came, was astonishing. Gordon Bryant, the new minister for Aboriginal affairs, asked how much money we would need to provide representation for Aboriginal people throughout the state."

Also involved with George were "a future federal minister, Fred Chaney; High Court judge Ron Wilson; the present Chief Justice of the High Court, Robert French; future state premier Peter Dowding; and others...."

== Marriage and family ==
In 1976, George met Rosalind Julian who, at that time, was studying arts at the University of New South Wales. They married in 1979, and four children followed: David (LLB UNSW, 2004 Rhodes scholar), Philip (completing a law degree at the University of Technology, Sydney), Madeleine (BA Sydney) and Julia (enrolled in economics/social science, Sydney University).

== Academic career ==
In 1973, Winterton won a Fulbright scholarship to study law at Columbia University in New York City, where he served as an associate-in-law, teaching legal research and writing, and international law.

While at Columbia, Winterton was interviewed for a position at the Law Faculty of the University of New South Wales, and he returned to Australia in 1975 to take up an appointment as a Senior Lecturer.

In 1983, Winterton completed his Doctorate of Juridical Science (JSD) at Columbia. His thesis on the executive power of the Commonwealth of Australia became the core of Parliament, the Executive and the Governor-General, which was published by Melbourne University Press in 1983, and which is still regarded as the leading text on the subject. In 1998, Winterton founded the Constitutional Law and Policy Review, remaining its general editor until his death.

At UNSW, Winterton taught Public Law, Succession and Advanced Equity, Advanced Administrative Law, International Law and, ultimately, Federal Constitutional Law, the High Court of Australia, Comparative Law, Legal History and Comparative Constitutional Law. He was promoted to professor of law, and was awarded a Jubilee Medallion in 1999.

In 2004, Winterton took up a position of Professor of Constitutional Law at the University of Sydney, where he taught Federal Constitutional Law, High Court of Australia, and Comparative Constitutional Law. Winterton did not sever his ties with UNSW, where he had several colleagues in his field, and the university recognised his service by appointing him Emeritus Professor in 2004.

The University of Western Australia awarded him the honorary degree of Doctor of Laws in 2007.

== Illness and death ==
In 1998 Winterton developed a rare sarcoma in his left leg, and in 2001 he was diagnosed with bowel cancer. "He continued to write, teach, and publish, interrupted by operations, chemotherapy and countless investigations and procedures." Only in the last months did he cease to attend his Sydney Law School office where he would arrive around noon, and work late, often until 2:00 am. George Winterton died in Sydney on 6 November 2008, aged 61. He was survived by his mother Rita, wife Ros, four children and his brother.

== Public affairs and constitutional reform ==
Winterton provided legal advice to Commonwealth and state governments, other public bodies and law firms.

Winterton criticised Sir Garfield Barwick and Sir John Kerr for not having paid closer attention to the constitution before Kerr, the governor-general, sacked the Whitlam government in 1975, with Barwick's advice. Winterton said Barwick had invented a convention that "a prime minister who cannot obtain supply ... must either advise a general election or resign", pointing out that, although section 83 of the constitution forbids the expenditure of unappropriated funds, appropriated funds had not been exhausted. The sacking, he said, diminished respect for conventions.

He served as a member of the Executive Government Advisory Committee for the Constitutional Commission in 1986 and 1987, chaired by Sir Zelman Cowen.

His Monarchy to Republic helped reignite debate over the issue of Australian republicanism. In 1993, he served as a member of the Republic Advisory Committee. He was appointed as a delegate to the 1998 Constitutional Convention. He wrote the original bi-partisan appointment model.

Chief Justice Robert French has written:

He also proposed a new preamble for the Constitution and amendments necessary to reflect a minimalist Republican model. George spelt out certain principles which should guide the formulation of a new constitutional preamble. They were reflective of his own personality and approach to legal issues. Shortly they were:
1. A conservative principle -- the existing preamble should be retained as far as possible for constitutional continuity and social harmony.
2. The preamble should be honest. It should not make promises about rights which the Constitution itself would not deliver.
3. The prose should be pithy, avoiding jargon and platitude.
4. It should embody only the most fundamental, uncontroversial and universally acceptable values.
5. It should avoid provisions likely to have legal effect. They should be found in the body of the Constitution.
His proposed preamble was founded upon the notion of popular sovereignty and ended with the words: "We, the people of Australia, do hereby enact and give to ourselves this Constitution."

== Legacy ==
A Gedenkschrift in celebration of his life and learning has been published: H. P. Lee and Peter Gerangelos (eds), Constitutional Advancement in a Frozen Continent: Essays in Honour of George Winterton (2009).

The inaugural George Winterton Lecture was delivered by Chief Justice Robert French, of the High Court of Australia, on 18 February 2010 at the Sydney Law School on the topic of the Executive Power under the Constitution of the Commonwealth of Australia.

Winterton's textbook Australian Federal Constitutional Law: Commentary and Materials, first published in 1999, with a second edition in 2007, appeared in a third edition in 2013 with his pupil Peter Gerangelos as general editor.
