= John Warhurst (academic) =

Australian academic and republican activist

John Lewis Warhurst, AO (born 29 February 1948) is a noted Australian academic and a prominent leader within the Australian Republican Movement. He currently holds the positions of emeritus professor at the Australian National University and deputy chair of the Republican Movement.

== Biography ==
The son of Tom Warhurst Sr., he graduated from Saint Ignatius' College, Adelaide in 1965 and studied politics and economics at Flinders University, graduating in 1972. He left South Australia soon after, working in a number of different states, before teaching overseas at the University of London. He moved back to Australia in 1985 to teach at the University of New England, where he was professor of politics for eight years. In 1993, Warhurst took up the prestigious post of professor of political science at ANU, a position he held until 2008. He currently teaches there, as emeritus professor.

== Republicanism ==
Warhurst is probably best known as one of Australia's most prominent republicans. He began advocating a republic in the early 1970s as a young academic and joined the Australian Republican Movement in the mid-1990s. He first became significantly active as part of the ACT ARM campaign team for the 1997 Constitutional Convention elections. Within the leadership of the ARM, he served first as ACT Convenor (2001–2004), and then as national Chair of the Movement (2002–2005).

In 2005 Warhurst stood aside as chair. In 2007 he was elected as deputy chair and in 2008 was again elected as convenor of the ACT branch. He currently holds both positions. Additionally, for several years he has been – along with the current chair – one of the ARM's two main media spokespersons, with regular appearances on television and radio. He also writes a weekly column on public affairs for the Canberra Times.
