= McGarvie model =

Proposed amendment to the Australian constitution

The McGarvie model is a proposition for change to the Australian Constitution to remove references to the monarchy and establish a republic. It is also known as the Australian Democracy Model.

The model was developed by former Governor of Victoria Richard McGarvie and originally submitted to the Republic Advisory Committee in 1993. At the Constitutional Convention of 1998, it was the second most popular model of the four voted upon.

Under the McGarvie model, a Constitutional Council would appoint and dismiss the head of state, the Governor-General. The Constitutional Council would be bound to act in accordance with the Prime Minister's advice by a convention backed by the penalty of public dismissal for breach.

The three members of the Constitutional Council, who can act by majority, are determined automatically by constitutional formula, with places going first to former Governors-General (with priority to the most recently retired), and excess places going (on the same basis) in turn to former state governors, lieutenant-governors (or equivalent), judges of the High Court or judges of the Federal Court.

The tenure of the head of state would be under the same arrangements as the existing practice for the current Governor-General. The head of state would also have the same range of powers as the current Governor-General, but, except for the reserve powers, they could only be exercised on the advice of the Federal Executive Council or a Minister. Otherwise there would be no codification of the constitutional conventions.

The only eligibility requirement for a head of state under the McGarvie model would be Australian citizenship, because the process for selecting the head of state is designed to ensure a non-political head of state.

Supporters of the model claim that, although described as "no-risk but uninspiring" and occasionally as "elitist", it has the considerable advantage of being developed by one with experience as a governor and hence a working knowledge of how the system of governorship actually functions in Australia. They claim it is straightforward, easily implemented, demonstrates twin requirements of practicality and principle, and keeps the separation of powers intact.

Legal commentators have remarked that the McGarvie model is broadly consistent with the constitution's existing arrangements under the monarchy and that it requires the least change to constitutional practice.

Some republicans have been critical of the appointment process in the McGarvie model and argue that a model without any public participation in its selection mechanism would not be successful in any referendum to change the constitution.
