= Bi-partisan appointment republican model =

The bi-partisan appointment republican model was a proposal for Australian constitutional reform. If approved at referendum, the model would have established Australia as a republic with a head of state appointed by the Australian Federal Parliament. The model was put to the people at the November 1999 republican referendum and was defeated by 54.4% of voters.

== Model details ==
Under the model, nominations for the head of state or president could have been made by any Australian citizen or group of citizens. These would have been received by a nominations committee established by Parliament. The committee would provide a report to the prime minister on the most suitable candidates for the position. The prime minister would select a candidate after securing support from the leader of the opposition. This bi-partisan part of the procedure gives the model its name.

The formal appointment of the head of state would have been made in a joint sitting of Parliament, attended by members of both the Senate and House of Representatives. A special two-thirds majority would have been required to ratify the candidate's appointment as head of state.

The powers of the proposed head of state would not have been substantially different from those of the reigning monarch and governor general. The head of state would have been vested with the powers of executive government, but those powers would have been normally exercised on the advice of ministers.

Under the model, the term of the head of state would have been five years. The head of state could have been removed by the prime minister, but this decision would have been subject to confirmation by the House of Representatives within thirty days. Any vacancy in the post would have been temporarily filled by the longest-serving state governor.

== Rationale ==
If implemented, the model would have established an Australian republic by removing constitutional links to the monarchy. References to either king or governor-general in the Australian constitution would have been replaced by a reference to the president of Australia.

Supporters of the model argued that appointed presidents would carry out the presidential duties in a very similar fashion to the current governor-general, as the method of appointment requires the combined support of the major political parties. The president would continue to act on the advice of the prime minister, as to do otherwise would invite dismissal. Consequently, the change to a republic is argued to have minimal impact on the rest of Australia's parliament and government.

Although the 1999 referendum was limited to the federal jurisdiction, the model is able to be adopted with little modification by each of the six Australian states to formally break ties with the monarchy.

== Critique of the model ==
The model was criticised for its lack of democratic qualities. The head of state is not elected by the people and the prime minister may legally ignore all nominations made by ordinary citizens. The model was specifically criticised for allowing the prime minister to dismiss the head of state.

The model was also criticised for its bi-partisan mechanism. According to some, the deliberate seeking of support by the prime minister to the opposition leader, who are by definition political adversaries, may influence the outcome of other policy contests. The mandate implicitly conferred by two-thirds of the parliament may encourage the president to make use of reserve powers.

== History ==
The original model was developed by legal academic George Winterton, and influenced by systems used in Europe. The central concept was for a president, appointed by a two-thirds majority of parliament. Subsequent to a judicial process, the president could be dismissed by an absolute majority in both houses of parliament. After consulting with other experts, the proposal with drafted amendments was published in the Independent Monthly of March 1992 and was supported by the Australian Republican Movement (ARM).

In 1993 the model was reviewed as one of four options by the Republic Advisory Committee, chaired by Malcolm Turnbull, who shortly after became ARM chairman. Prime Minister Paul Keating presented a slightly altered version, providing both appointment and dismissal by a two-thirds majority of parliament. He declared that this version, often called the Keating-Turnbull Model, should be put to the people.

Under Prime Minister John Howard, the model was closely examined and criticised at the 1998 constitutional convention. The model evolved to incorporate a nominations committee and authority to dismiss the head of state was taken from the parliament and given to the prime minister. With these changes, the model was supported by a simple majority of 73 out of 152 delegates, 22 abstaining. An absolute majority of 89 then agreed it should be put to the people.

At the 1999 Australian republic referendum, the model was supported by opposition parties, progressives and some conservatives who feared a future directly elected president, while monarchists and those favouring other republican models rejected it. The referendum failed, with especially large majorities against in rural and outer suburban electorates.

After the defeat, the Australian Republican Movement downgraded the model's status from preferred to one of six possible options. Its long-term future is likely to depend on the result of a proposed models plebiscite, which would allow electors to directly show their support for this version of republicanism.

== See also ==
- Australian republicanism
