= Constitutional convention (Australia) =

Significant meetings debating the Australian Constitution

Constitutional conventions in Australia are significant meetings that have debated the Australian Constitution. The first two gatherings debated Federation and what form of Constitution to adopt, while the following conventions debated amendments to the document.

The draft Constitution that was the final product of the first two conventions was approved at referendum in 1899 and 1900 by a 72% "Yes" vote on a 58% turnout. There have been four of the latter conventions post Federation, but no constitutional proposal from these has been approved by referendum, and those put to referendum (proposals from the 1942 and 1998 conventions) were soundly defeated, reaching no more than 46% approval on 90% to 96% turnout.

== 1891 convention ==
The 1891 Constitutional Convention was held in Sydney in March 1891 to consider a draft Frame of Government for the proposed federation of the British colonies in Australia and New Zealand. There were 46 delegates at the convention, chosen by the seven colonial parliaments. Among the delegates was Sir Henry Parkes, known as the "Father of Federation". The Convention approved a draft largely written by Andrew Inglis Clark from Tasmania and Samuel Griffith from Queensland, but the colonial parliaments failed to act to give effect to it.

== 1897–1898 convention ==
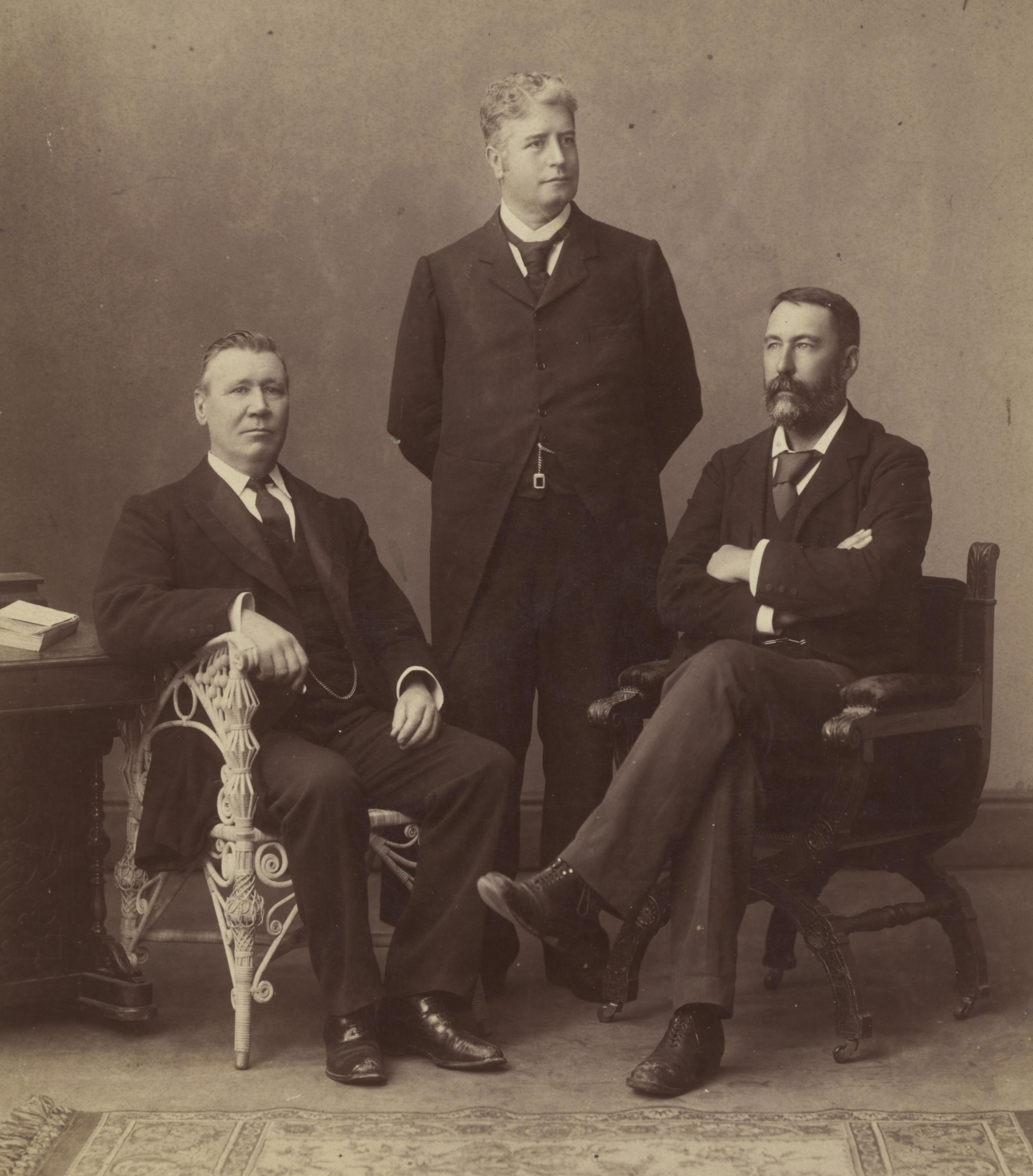
The drafting committee at the 1897–98 convention – John Downer, Edmund Barton and Richard O'Connor

The next constitutional convention – the Australasian Federal Convention – was held in stages in 1897–98. Unlike the first convention, the delegates from New South Wales, Victoria, South Australia and Tasmania were elected by popular vote. The delegates of Western Australia were chosen by its parliament. It met first in Adelaide in March 1897, then in Sydney in August, before, finally, it met again in Melbourne in January 1898. The intervals between the sessions were used for intense debate in the colonial parliaments and for public discussion of the draft constitution.

Since 1891, New Zealand had lost interest in federating with the Australian colonies, and was not represented. In Queensland, the parliament had not passed the necessary legislation, so the northern colony was also unrepresented. In the other five colonies ten delegates from each colony were elected by the people, although Western Australian attendance was sporadic. At Melbourne the convention finally produced a draft constitution which was eventually approved by the people at referendums in the colonies.

== 1942 convention ==
In November 1942, the Curtin government convened a constitutional convention for the sole purpose of discussing Attorney-General's proposed addition to the constitution of section 60A. This would have made the powers of federal parliament virtually unlimited, declaring "the power of the Parliament shall extend to all measures which in the declared opinion of the Parliament will tend to achieve economic security and social justice ... notwithstanding anything contained elsewhere in this Constitution". The convention was held in Canberra and consisted of 24 members – six nominated by the federal government, six by the federal opposition, the six state premiers, and the six state leaders of the opposition. After an opening speech by Prime Minister John Curtin, Evatt announced that he was withdrawing his original draft due to public criticism and would substitute a watered-down series of proposals. The convention eventually agreed unanimously to instead use the Constitution's referral powers to give the authority to the federal government, and appointed a drafting committee which produced the "14 powers" to be referred.

After only some of the states referred the 14 powers which had been agreed on, the changes were instead put to a referendum in 1944. That proposal was lost at the referendum, only gaining 46% of the vote and only passing in two of the six states (SA & WA).

== 1973 convention ==
The 1973 Constitutional Convention was established by the Whitlam government in 1973 to consider possible amendments to the Constitution which could be put to the people for approval at a referendum. The convention, which was not elected but consisted of delegates chosen by the federal and state Parliaments, met through 1973–75 but achieved nothing as a result of non-support by the conservative parties.

== 1998 convention ==
The 1998 Constitutional Convention met in Canberra in February 1998. The convention was convened by Prime Minister John Howard to fulfill a promise made by his predecessor as Liberal leader, Alexander Downer. During the convention, Prime Minister John Howard dedicated an area of parkland to the south-east of Old Parliament House as Constitution Place, Canberra.

The Convention consisted of 152 delegates, of whom half were elected by the people and half were appointed by the federal government. This latter group included senior federal, state and territory politicians appointed by virtue of their positions.

The convention was divided into four philosophical groups: those wanting to retain Australia's existing constitutional monarchy, those wanting Australia to become a republic with a president chosen by the Parliament ("indirect electionists"), those wanting Australia to become a republic with a president elected by the people ("direct electionists"), and those having no fixed position or seeking a compromise between the other groups. In the fourth group, Republicans dominated both subgroups, but proved far from united in their views.

At the opening of the convention, Prime Minister John Howard stated:

If this Convention does not express a clear view on a preferred republican alternative, then the people will be asked – after the next election – to vote in a preliminary plebiscite which presents them with all the reasonable alternatives. Then a formal constitutional referendum offering a choice between the present system and the republican alternative receiving most support in the preliminary plebiscite would follow.

— Prime Minister John Howard, 2 February 1998.

73 delegates voted in favour of the Bi-partisan appointment model, 57 against and 22 abstained. Not one constitutional monarchist delegate voted in favour. The policy of Australians for Constitutional Monarchy (ACM) and other monarchist groups was to oppose all republican models, including the minimalist McGarvie model. In response, John Howard stated to the convention:

The only commonsense interpretation of this Convention is, firstly, that a majority of people have voted generically in favour of a republic... Secondly, amongst the republican models, the one that has just got 73 votes is clearly preferred. When you bind those two together, it would be a travesty in commonsense terms of Australian democracy for that proposition not to be put to the Australian people. Moreover, it would represent a cynical dishonouring of my word as Prime Minister and the promises that my coalition made to the Australian people before the last election.

— Prime Minister John Howard on 13 February 1998.

A number of republicans who supported direct election abstained from the vote (such as Ted Mack, Phil Cleary, and Clem Jones), thereby allowing the bi-partisan model to succeed. They reasoned that the model would be defeated at a referendum, and a second referendum called with direct election as the model.

== See also ==
- History of Australia
- Australian Constitutional history
- Commonwealth of Australia Constitution Act
- Monarchy in Australia
- Republicanism in Australia
- Republic Advisory Committee
- McGarvie Model
- Constitutional recognition of Indigenous Australians
- First Nations National Constitutional Convention
