= Australian Republic Movement =

- Co-Chairs: Esther Anatolitis; Patrick McGorry
- Vice-Chair: Adam Spencer
- Treasurer: Isaac McSwan
- Founded: July 1991; 35 years ago
- Women's wing: ARM Women's Network
- Ideology: Republicanism
- National Committee: Esther Anatolitis; Nathan Hansford; Jack Archer; Peter Botsman; Michael Cooney; Alec Hayes; John Keogh; Isaac McSwan; Justin O’Brien; Beth O’Leary; Yasmin Poole; Aaron Richards; Adam Spencer; Stephen Walters

Website
- Australian Republic Movement

The Australian Republic Movement (ARM) is a non-partisan nationalist organisation campaigning for an Australia "with an Australian" as president rather than a hereditary monarch. While styling itself as the “movement”, ARM is a company with membership restricted by its constitution and decisions controlled by directors. ARM and its supporters have promoted various models of presidency including a parliamentary republic. It has branches active in all states and territories.

== History ==
=== Foundation ===
ARM was founded on 7 July 1991 and was originally named the Australian Republican Movement. Its first chairman was novelist Thomas Keneally, with other founding members including lawyer Malcolm Turnbull (later Prime Minister), former Australian cricket captain Ian Chappell, and film director Fred Schepisi as well as Geoffrey Dutton, Donald Horne, Jenny Kee, Franco Belgiorno-Nettis, Franca Arena, Faith Bandler, Mark Day, Geraldine Doogue, Colin Lanceley, Harry Seidler, David Williamson and Neville Wran.

In May 2024, after just 14 months as co-chairs, Australian retired Socceroo and human rights advocate Craig Foster and former Olympian and politician Nova Peris both resigned because of their conflicting views on the war in Gaza.

=== 1999 referendum ===
The 1999 Australian republic referendum, held on 6 November 1999, was a two-question referendum to amend the Constitution of Australia. For some years, opinion polls had suggested that a majority of the electorate favoured a republic but the 1999 referendum was defeated. Suggested reasons include a lack of bi-partisanship and division among republicans on the method proposed for selection of a president.

=== Australian Choice Model ===
On 13 January 2022, ARM announced its latest proposed model for how a president would be nominated and elected, named the Australian Choice Model. It would limit Australian's choice to candidates nominated by politicians. Each state and territory parliament would nominate one candidate to be the president and the federal parliament would nominate up to three candidates. The up to eleven nominees would then be put to voters to elect the president. However, the same candidate could be nominated by more than one parliament. The governing political parties in the parliaments would dominate the nominations and political parties are unlikely to nominate more than one candidate to run against their chosen nominee, which could result in just one candidate and the Australian Choice Model giving Australian voters no choice at all, in a fait accompli. The president would serve a five-year term.

The model is similar to former ARM chair Geoff Gallop's 1998 model, and following a concept from a 2004 Senate report, the hybrid model aims to resolve the divided opinions as to whether the parliament or people should elect a president. ARM claimed their research indicated this approach has high levels of public support compared to previous direct election or parliamentary appointment models and therefore has the best prospects of success at a referendum.

The model includes proposed constitutional amendments drafted and supported by ten constitutional law scholars. The proposed amendments also codify the Reserve powers of the Head of state with some variance from how they are exercised presently.

A majority of ARM members voted to support the model and ARM claimed its research showed high public support but the model raised concerns and criticisms from not only the Australian Monarchist League, but also other republicans, including former prime minister Paul Keating and former New South Wales Premier Bob Carr. Critics such as Carr claim that a president who is elected by the public could cause conflict with a prime minister and Parliament. Then-ARM Chair Peter FitzSimons argued against these criticisms, noting that the president's powers would be limited and they would be unable to dismiss a prime minister.

== Chairs ==
No.	Image	Chair	Term	No.	Image	Chair	Term
1		Thomas Keneally	1991 − November 1993	(One chair from 1992−2022)			
2		Malcolm Turnbull	November 1993 − 20 September 2000	(One chair from 1992−2022)			
3		Greg Barns	20 September 2000 − 2002	(One chair from 1992−2022)			
4		John Warhurst	2002 − 2005	(One chair from 1992−2022)			
5		Ted O'Brien	2005 − 2007	(One chair from 1992−2022)			
6		Michael Keating	2007 − 26 November 2012	(One chair from 1992−2022)			
7		Geoff Gallop	26 November 2012 − 20 July 2015	(One chair from 1992−2022)			
8		Peter FitzSimons	20 July 2015 − 16 November 2022	(One chair from 1992−2022)			
9		Craig Foster	16 November 2022 − 10 July 2024	9		Nova Peris	13 March 2023 − 10 July 2024
10		Esther Anatolitis	10 July 2024 − present	10		Nathan Hansford	10 July 2024 − present

== See also ==
- Republicanism in Australia
- 1999 Australian republic referendum
- Ausflag
- Australian Constitutional history
- Commonwealth of Nations
- Commonwealth realm
- Culture of Australia
- Statute of Westminster Adoption Act 1942
