= Republicanism in Australia =

Movement to turn Australia into a republic

Republicanism in Australia is a movement to change Australia's system of government from a constitutional monarchy to a republic; presumably, a form of parliamentary republic that would replace the monarch of Australia (currently King Charles III) with a non-royal Australian head of state. It is opposed to monarchism in Australia. Republicanism was first espoused in Australia before Federation in 1901. After a period of decline following Federation, the movement again became prominent at the end of the 20th century after successive legal and socio-cultural changes loosened Australia's ties with the United Kingdom.

In a referendum held in 1999, Australian voters rejected a proposal to establish a republic with a parliamentary appointed head of state. This was despite polls showing a majority of Australians supported a republic in principle for some years before the vote.

Republicanism is officially supported by the Labor Party and the Greens. It is supported by some members of the Liberal Party and other members of the Australian Parliament. Under the first Albanese ministry, there was an assistant minister for the republic from 1 June 2022 until 29 July 2024.

== History ==
=== Before federation ===
In his journal The Currency Lad, first published in Sydney in 1832, pastoralist and politician Horatio Wills was the first person to openly espouse Australian republicanism. Born to a convict father, Wills was devoted to the emancipist cause and promoted the interests of "currency lads and lasses" (Australian-born Europeans).

A modern version of the Eureka Flag. The flag is a popular option for the new flag of an Australian Republic.

Some leaders and participants of the revolt at the Eureka Stockade in 1854 held republican views and the incident has been used to encourage republicanism in subsequent years, with the Eureka Flag appearing in connection with some republican groups. The Australian Republican Association (ARA) was founded in response to the Eureka Stockade, advocating the abolition of governors and their titles, the revision of the penal code, payment of members of parliament, the nationalisation of land and an independent federal Australian republic outside of the British Empire. David Flint, the national convener of Australians for Constitutional Monarchy, notes that a movement emerged in favour of a White Australia policy; however British authorities in Whitehall were opposed to segregational laws. He suggests that to circumvent Westminster, those in favour of the discriminatory policies backed the proposed secession from the Empire as a republic.

One attendee of the ARA meetings was the Australian-born poet Henry Lawson, who wrote his first poem, entitled A Song of the Republic, in The Republican journal.

Banish from under your bonny skies
Those old-world errors and wrongs and lies

— Henry Lawson, A Song of the Republic

=== Federation and decline ===
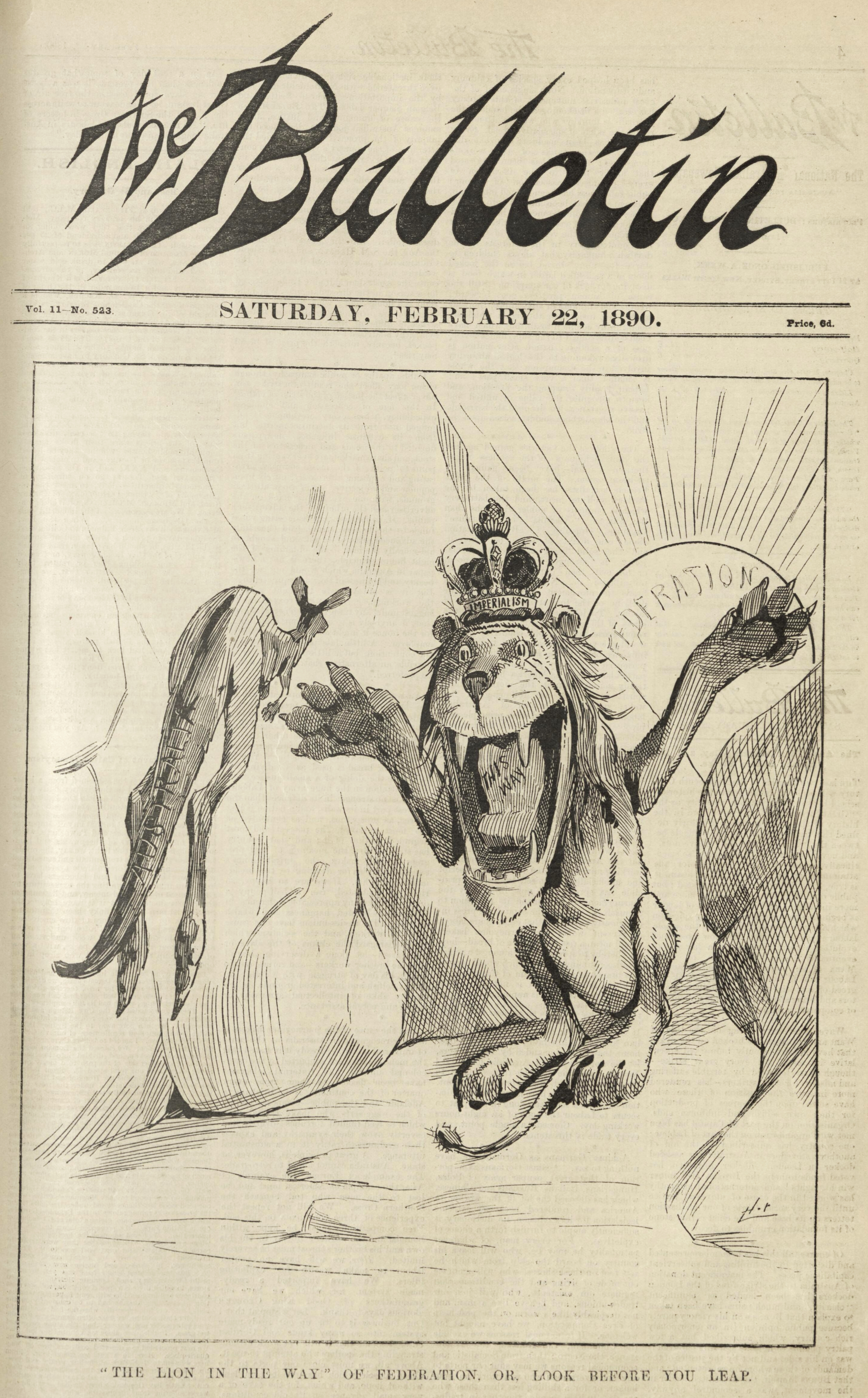
Front cover of an 1890 edition of the republican magazine The Bulletin, warning that federation of the colonies may ensure Australia's membership of the British Empire.

At the Australian Federation Convention, which produced the first draft that was to become the Australian Constitution in 1891, a former Premier of New South Wales, George Dibbs, stated the "inevitable destiny of the people of this great country" would be the establishment of "the Republic of Australia". The fervour of republicanism tailed off in the 1890s as the labour movement became concerned with the Federation of Australia. The republican movement dwindled further during and after World War I as emotional and patriotic support for the war effort went hand in hand with a renewed sense of loyalty to the monarchy. The Bulletin abandoned republicanism and became a conservative, Empire loyalist paper. The Returned and Services League formed in 1916 and became an important bastion of monarchist sentiment.

The conservative parties were fervently monarchist and although the Labor Party campaigned for greater Australian independence within the Empire and generally supported the appointment of Australians as Governor-General, it did not question the monarchy itself. Under the Labor government of John Curtin, a member of the Royal Family, Prince Henry, Duke of Gloucester, was appointed Governor-General during World War II. The royal tour of Queen Elizabeth II in 1954 saw a reported 7 million Australians (out of a total population of 9 million) out to see her.

The 1975 Australian constitutional crisis, which culminated in the dismissal of Prime Minister Gough Whitlam by Governor-General John Kerr, raised questions about the value of maintaining a supposedly symbolic office that still possessed many key constitutional powers and what an Australian president with the same reserve powers would do in a similar situation.

=== Changes to oaths and titles ===
References to the monarchy were removed from various institutions through the late 1980s and 1990s. For example, in 1993, the Oath of Citizenship, which included an assertion of allegiance to the Australian monarch, was replaced by a pledge to be loyal to "Australia and its people". Earlier, in 1990, the formula of enactment for the Parliament of Australia was changed from "Be it enacted by the Queen, and the Senate, and the House of Representatives of the Commonwealth of Australia as follows" to "The Parliament of Australia enacts".

Barristers in New South Wales (from 1993), Queensland (from 1994), ACT (from 1995), Victoria (from 2000), Western Australia (from 2001), Tasmania (from 2005), Northern Territory (from 2007), Commonwealth (from March 2007) and South Australia (from 2008) were no longer appointed Queen's Counsel (QC), but as Senior Counsel (SC). These changes were criticised by Justice Michael Kirby and other monarchists as moves to a "republic by stealth". However beginning with Queensland in 2013, Victoria and the Commonwealth in 2014 and followed by South Australia in 2020 the title of Queen's Counsel (QC) and now King's Counsel (KC) has again been conferred, in part due to the title's greater regard and recognition, internationally and domestically. There remains interest in New South Wales for a reintroduction of the title. In 2024, South Australia reverted back to only appointing SCs.

=== Keating government proposals ===
The Australian Labor Party (ALP) first made republicanism its official policy in 1991, with then Prime Minister Bob Hawke describing a republic as "inevitable". Following the ALP decision, the Australian Republican Movement (ARM) was born. Hawke's successor, Paul Keating, pursued the republican agenda much more actively than Hawke and established the Republic Advisory Committee to produce an options paper on issues relating to the possible transition to a republic to take effect on the centenary of Federation: 1 January 2001. The committee produced its report in April 1993 and in it argued that "a republic is achievable without threatening Australia's cherished democratic institutions".

In response to the report, Keating promised a referendum on the establishment of a republic, replacing the Governor-General with a president, and removing references to the Australian sovereign. The president was to be nominated by the prime minister and appointed by a two-thirds majority in a joint sitting of the Senate and House of Representatives. The referendum was to be held either in 1998 or 1999. However, Keating's party lost the 1996 federal election in a landslide and he was replaced by John Howard, a monarchist, as prime minister.

=== 1998 Constitutional Convention ===
With the change in government in 1996, Prime Minister John Howard proceeded with an alternative policy of holding a constitutional convention. This was held over two weeks in February 1998 at Old Parliament House. Half of the 152 delegates were elected and half were appointed by the federal and state governments. Convention delegates were asked whether or not Australia should become a republic and which model for a republic is preferred. At the opening of the convention, Howard stated that if the convention could not decide on a model to be put to a referendum, then plebiscites would be held on the model preferred by the Australian public.

At the convention, a republic gained majority support (89 votes to 52 with 11 abstentions), but the question of what model for a republic should be put to the people at a referendum produced deep divisions among republicans. Four republican models were debated: two involving direct election of the head of state; one involving appointment on the advice of the prime minister (the McGarvie Model); and one involving appointment by a two-thirds majority of parliament (the bi-partisan appointment model).

The latter was eventually successful at the convention, even though it only obtained a majority because of 22 abstentions in the final vote (57 against delegates voted against the model and 73 voted for, three votes short of an actual majority of delegates). A number of those who abstained were republicans who supported direct election (such as Ted Mack, Phil Cleary, Clem Jones, and Andrew Gunter), thereby allowing the bi-partisan model to succeed. They reasoned that the model would be defeated at a referendum and a second referendum called with direct election as the model. The convention also made recommendations about a preamble to the constitution and a proposed preamble was also put to referendum. According to critics, the two-week timeline and quasi-democratic composition of the convention is evidence of an attempt by John Howard to frustrate the republican cause, a claim John Howard adamantly rejects.

=== 1999 Republican referendum ===
The republic referendum was held on 6 November 1999, after a national advertising campaign and the distribution of 12.9 million 'Yes/No' case pamphlets. It comprised two questions: The first asked whether Australia should become a republic in which the Governor-General and monarch would be replaced by one office, the President of the Commonwealth of Australia, the occupant elected by a two-thirds vote of the Australian parliament for a fixed term. The second question, generally deemed to be far less important politically, asked whether Australia should alter the constitution to insert a preamble. Neither of the amendments passed, with 55% of all electors and all states voting 'no' to the proposed amendment; it was not carried in any state. The preamble referendum question was also defeated, with a Yes vote of only 39%.

Many opinions were put forward for the defeat, some relating to perceived difficulties with the parliamentary appointment model, others relating to the lack of public engagement or that most Australians were simply happy to keep the status quo. Some republicans voted no because they did not agree with provisions such as the president being instantly dismissible by the prime minister.

=== 2000s: Following the referendum ===
On 26 June 2003, the Senate referred an inquiry into an Australian republic to the Senate Legal and Constitutional References Committee. During 2004, the committee reviewed 730 submissions and conducted hearings in all state capitals. The committee tabled its report, called Road to a Republic, on 31 August 2004. The report examined the contest between minimalist and direct-election models and gave attention to hybrid models such as the electoral college model, the constitutional council model, and models having both an elected president and a Governor-General. The bi-partisan recommendations of committee supported educational initiatives and holding a series of plebiscites to allow the public to choose which model they preferred, prior to a final draft and referendum, along the lines of plebiscites proposed by John Howard at the 1998 constitutional convention.

Issues related to republicanism were raised by the March 2006 tour of Australia by Queen Elizabeth II. John Howard, still serving as prime minister, was then questioned by British journalists about the future of the Australian monarchy and there was debate about playing Australia's royal anthem, "God Save the Queen", during the opening of that year's Commonwealth Games, at which the monarch was present. In July 2007, Opposition Leader Kevin Rudd pledged to hold a new referendum on a republic if called on to form a government. However, he stated there was no fixed time frame for such a move and that the result of the 1999 referendum must be respected. After his party won the 2007 federal election and Rudd was appointed prime minister, he stated in April 2008 that a move to a republic was "not a top-order priority". In the lead-up to the 2010 federal election, Prime Minister Julia Gillard stated: "I believe that this nation should be a republic. I also believe that this nation has got a deep affection for Queen Elizabeth." She stated her belief that it would be appropriate for Australia to become a republic only once Queen Elizabeth II's reign ends.

=== 2010s ===
In November 2013, Governor-General Quentin Bryce proclaimed her support for an Australian republic, stating in a speech "perhaps, my friends, one day, one young girl or boy may even grow up to be our nation's first head of state". She had previously emphasised the importance of debate about the future of the Australian head of state and the evolution of the constitution. In January 2015, Opposition Leader Bill Shorten called for a new push for a republic, stating: "Let us declare that our head of state should be one of us. Let us rally behind an Australian republic - a model that truly speaks for who we are, our modern identity, our place in our region and our world." In September 2015, former ARM chair Malcolm Turnbull became leader of the Liberal Party and was appointed prime minister. He stated he would not pursue "his dream" of Australia becoming a republic until after the end of the Queen's reign, instead focusing his efforts toward the economy. Upon meeting Elizabeth II in July 2017, Turnbull declared himself an "Elizabethan" and stated he did not believe a majority of Australians would support a republic before the end of her reign.

In December 2016, News.com.au found that a slim majority of members of both houses of parliament supported Australia becoming a republic (54% in the House and 53% in the Senate). In July 2017, Opposition Leader Bill Shorten revealed that, should the Labor Party be elected in the 2019 federal election, they would legislate for a compulsory plebiscite on the issue. Should that plebiscite be supported by a majority of Australians, a second vote would be held, this time a referendum, asking the public for their support for a specific model of government. Labor lost the election.

=== 2020s ===
Following Labor's victory in the 2022 federal election, the new Prime Minister, Anthony Albanese, appointed Matt Thistlethwaite as the Assistant Minister for the Republic, signalling a commitment to prepare Australia for a transition to republic following the next election. After the death of Elizabeth II, former prime minister Julia Gillard opined that Australia would inevitably choose to be a republic, but agreed with Albanese's timing on debate about the matter. When asked if he supported another referendum following the Queen's death, Albanese stated it was "not the time" to discuss a republic. Instead the government had focused on the referendum to enshrine an Indigenous Voice to Parliament, which has been described by the assistant minister as a "critical first step" before a vote possibly some time in 2026. The Prime Minister Anthony Albanese had stated: "I couldn't envisage a circumstance where we changed our head of state to an Australian head of state but still didn't recognise First Nations people in our constitution."

After the Voice referendum failed, the government began to prioritise immediate economic policy over constitutional reforms, leading to concern from some republican leaders that a chance to hold another referendum would be delayed for a generation. In January 2024, the Labor government confirmed that a referendum was no longer a priority, however a break with the monarchy was still long-term party policy. On 28 July 2024, the position of assistant minister for the republic, which was first established on 1 June 2022, was abolished in a ministerial reshuffle.

On 13 May 2025, following the Coalition's defeat at the 2025 federal election, Sussan Ley and Ted O'Brien were elected as leader and deputy leader of the Liberal Party, respectively. Ley has previously declared her support for a republic, while O'Brien served as Chair of the Australian Republic Movement between 2005 and 2007. In September 2025, Albanese officially ruled out holding a referendum while he is prime minister.

== Arguments for change ==
=== Independence and head of state ===
A central argument made by Australian republicans is that, as Australia is an independent country, it is inappropriate and anomalous for Australia to share the person of its monarch with the United Kingdom. Republicans argue that the Australian monarch is not Australian and, as a national and resident of another country, cannot adequately represent Australia or Australian national aspirations, either to itself or to the rest of the world. Former Chief Justice Gerard Brennan stated that "so long as we retain the existing system our head of state is determined for us essentially by the parliament at Westminster". As ARM member Frank Cassidy put it in a speech on the issue: "In short, we want a resident for President."

=== Multiculturalism ===
Some republicans associate the monarchy with British identity and argue that Australia has changed demographically and culturally, from being "British to our bootstraps", as prime minister Sir Robert Menzies once put it, to being less British in nature (albeit maintaining an "English Core"). Many Australian republicans are of non-British ancestry, and feel no connection to the "mother country" to speak of. According to an Australian government inquiry, arguments put forth by these republicans include the claim that the idea of one person being both monarch of Australia and of the United Kingdom is an anomaly.

However, monarchists argue that immigrants who left unstable republics and have arrived in Australia since 1945 welcomed the social and political stability that they found in Australia under a constitutional monarchy. Further, some Aboriginal Australians, such as former Senator Neville Bonner, said a republican president would not "care one jot more for my people".

=== Social values and contemporary Australia ===
From some perspectives, it has been argued that several characteristics of the monarchy are in conflict with modern Australian values. The hereditary nature of the monarchy is said to conflict with egalitarianism and dislike of inherited privilege. The laws of succession were, before amendment to them in 2015, held by some to be sexist and the links between the monarchy and the Church of England inconsistent with Australia's secular character.

=== Sectarianian divides ===
Under the Act of Settlement, the monarch is prohibited from being a Catholic. Monarchism and republicanism in Australia have been claimed to delineate historical and persistent sectarian tensions with, broadly speaking, Catholics more likely to be republicans and Protestants more likely to be monarchists. This developed out of a historical cleavage in 19th- and 20th-century Australia, in which republicans were predominantly of Irish Catholic background and loyalists were predominantly of British Protestant background. Whilst mass immigration since the Second World War has diluted this conflict, the Catholic–Protestant divide has been cited as a dynamic in the republic debate, particularly in relation to the referendum campaign in 1999. Nonetheless, others have stated that Catholic–Protestant tensions—at least in the sense of an Irish–British conflict—are at least forty years dead with Catholicism now officially being the largest religion in Australia as per the 2021 Census.

It has also been claimed, however, that the Catholic–Protestant divide is intermingled with class issues. Republicanism in Australia has traditionally been supported most strongly by members of the urban working class with Irish Catholic backgrounds, whereas monarchism is a core value associated with urban and rural inhabitants of British Protestant heritage and the middle class, to the extent that there were calls in 1999 for 300,000 exceptionally enfranchised British subjects who were not Australian citizens to be barred from voting on the grounds that they would vote as a loyalist bloc in a tight referendum.

== Proposals for change ==
A typical proposal for an Australian republic provides for the King and Governor-General to be replaced by a president or an executive federal council. There is much debate on the appointment or election process that would be used and what role such an office would have.

Australians for Constitutional Monarchy and the Australian Monarchist League argue that no model is better than the present system and argue that the risk and difficulty of changing the constitution is best demonstrated by inability of republicans to back a definitive design.

=== The range of models ===
Australian republicans usually propose that the Governor-General is replaced by an Australian Head of State. They have proposed or shown support for a variety of methods for selecting and/or electing such a Head of State as follows:

- Election
  - by a popular vote of all Australian citizens;
  - by the federal parliament alone;
  - by federal and state parliaments;
  - by a hybrid process of popular and parliamentary votes.
- Selection
  - by the prime minister;
  - by consensus among the government and opposition;
  - by an electoral college.

Alternatively, some proposals provide for replacing only the monarchy and entirely retaining the role of Governor-General. The McGarvie model replaces the monarch with a constitutional council of former governors and judges. Copernican models replace the monarch with a directly elected figurehead, without executive authority. These models maintain the executive authority and reserve powers of the current Governor-General, appointed by the council or elected figurehead respectively.

Occasionally, it is proposed to abolish the roles of the Governor-General and the monarchy and have their functions exercised by other constitutional officers such as the speaker.

=== 2022 Australian Choice Model ===
Since 2022, the ARM has supported the Australian Choice Model, which they developed after consultation with more than 10,000 Australians. Originating in a 2004 Senate submission and 2018 book, the current model proposes that state, territory and Federal parliaments nominate eleven candidates which are then put to a national vote. The model aims to bridge a longstanding controversy of whether the parliament or people should elect a head of state.

The model includes specific constitutional amendments drafted and supported by ten constitutional law scholars. The proposed amendments codify the reserve powers of the Head of State with some variance from how they are exercised presently. The ARM claims that their research shows that their approach has significantly higher levels of support in the Australian community than direct election or parliamentary appointment models and would have the best prospects of success at a referendum.

=== Process models ===
From its foundation until the 1999 referendum, the ARM supported the bi-partisan appointment model, which would result in a President elected by the Parliament of Australia, with the powers currently held by the Governor-General. It is argued that the requirement of a two-thirds majority in a vote of both houses of parliament would result in a bi-partisan appointment, preventing a party politician from becoming president.

From 2010 to 2022, the ARM proposed a non-binding plebiscite to decide the model, followed by a binding referendum to amend the Constitution, reflecting the model chosen. Opponents of holding non-binding plebiscites include monarchist David Flint, who described this process as "inviting a vote of no confidence in one of the most successful constitutions in the world," and minimalist republican Greg Craven, who states "a multi-option plebiscite inevitably will produce a direct election model, precisely for the reason that such a process favours models with shallow surface appeal and multiple flaws. Equally inevitably, such a model would be doomed at referendum."

== Public opinion ==
Public opinion polls for becoming a republic or staying as a monarchy
Date	Firm	Republic	Monarchy	Undecided
November 2025	Resolve	43%	28%	29%
28–31 October 2024	YouGov	41%	59%	-
October 2024	Roy Morgan	43%	57%	-
18–23 October 2024	2024 Royal Tour of Australia by King Charles III and Queen Camilla			
October 2024	Pulse of Australia	33%	45%	22%
January 2024	Essential	42%	35%	23%
May 2023	Essential	54%	46%	-
6–8 May 2023	Coronation weekend of King Charles III and Queen Camilla			
March 2023	Lord Ashcroft	42%	35%	16%
December 2022	Ipsos	54%	46%	-
December 2022	ANU	54%	46%	-
December 2022	Australian Community Media	52%	32%	16%
September 2022	Resolve Strategic	46%	54%	-
September 2022	Guardian/Essential	43%	37%	20%
September 2022	Roy Morgan	40%	60%	-
8 September 2022	King Charles III accedes to the throne following the death of Queen Elizabeth II			
January 2022	Resolve Political Monitor	54%	46%	-
January 2022	Resolve Political Monitor	38%	30%	32%
March 2021	Essential	48%	28%	25%
January 2021	Ipsos	34%	40%	26%
July 2020	YouGov	52%	32%	16%
June 2019	Essential	43%	33%	24%
November 2018	Essential	44%	32%	24%
November 2018	Newspoll	40%	48%	12%
May 2018	Essential	48%	30%	22%
19 May 2018	Marriage of Prince Harry and Megan Markle			
April 2018	Newspoll	50%	41%	9%
January 2018	ResearchNow	52%	22%	25%
January 2018	Essential	44%	29%	26%
August 2017	Newspoll	51%	38%	11%
January 2017	Essential	44%	30%	26%
December 2016	ANU	52.5%	47.5%	–
January 2016	Newspoll	51%	37%	12%
April 2014	Fairfax-Nielsen	42%	51%	7%
February 2014	ReachTEL	39%	42%	19%
June 2012	Roy Morgan	35%	58%	7%
19–29 October 2011	2011 Royal Tour by Queen Elizabeth II			
May 2011	Roy Morgan	34%	55%	11%
29 April 2011	Wedding of Prince William and Catherine			
January 2011	Newspoll	41%	39%	20%
August 2010	Fairfax-Nielsen	44%	48%	8%
October 2009	UMR	59%	33%	8%
November 2008	UMR	50%	28%	22%
May 2008	Morgan	45%	42%	13%
January 2007	Newspoll	45%	36%	19%
January 2006	Newspoll	46%	34%	20%
January 2005	Newspoll	46%	35%	19%
December 2003	Newspoll	51%	32%	17%
November 2002	Newspoll	51%	35%	14%
July 2001	Newspoll	52%	35%	13%
March 2000	Newspoll	52%	35%	13%
6 November 1999	1999 Australian republic referendum (45.13% Republic – 54.87% Monarchy)			
August 1999	Newspoll	51%	35%	14%
July 1999	Newspoll	46%	34%	20%

Public opinion polls for becoming a republic or having a resident Australian monarch
Date	Firm	Republic	Monarchy (resident monarch)	Undecided
November 2023	Pollfish	65%	35%	-
April 2022	Ipsos	47%	23%	30%

Public opinion polls for becoming a republic or continuing to share a monarch with the United Kingdom or having a resident Australian monarch
Date	Firm	Republic	Monarchy (shared monarch)	Monarchy (resident monarch)	None
March 2025	Pollfish	42%	38%	4%	16%
November 2021	Ipsos	37%	41%	13%	9%
February 2020	YouGov	42%	37%	13%	9%

Polls and surveys generate different responses depending on the wording of the questions, mostly in regards the type of republic, and often appear contradictory.

In 2009, the Australian Electoral Survey that is conducted following all elections by the Australian National University has found that support for a republic has remained reasonably static since 1987 at around 60%, if the type of republic is not part of the question. The survey also shows that support or opposition is relatively weak: 31% strongly support a republic while only 10% strongly oppose. Roy Morgan research has indicated that support for the monarchy has been supported by a majority of Australians since 2010, with support for a republic being in the majority between 1999 and 2004.

An opinion poll held in November 2008 that separated the questions found support for a republic at 50% with 28% opposed. Asked how the president should be chosen if there were to be a republic, 80% said elected by the people, against 12% who favoured appointment by parliament. In October 2009, another poll by UMR found 59% support for a republic and 33% opposition. 73% supported direct election, versus 18% support for parliamentary appointment.

On 29 August 2010, The Sydney Morning Herald published a poll produced by Nielsen, asking multiple questions on the future of the monarchy:

- 48% of the 1400 respondents were opposed to constitutional change (a rise of 8% since 2008)
- 44% supported change (a drop of 8% since 2008).

But when asked which of the following statements best described their view:

- 31% said Australia should never become a republic.
- 29% said Australia should become a republic as soon as possible.
- 34% said Australia should become a republic only after Queen Elizabeth II's reign ends.

A survey of 1,000 readers of The Sun-Herald and The Sydney Morning Herald, published in The Sydney Morning Herald on 21 November 2010, found 68% of respondents were in favour of Australia becoming a republic, while 25% said it should not. More than half the respondents, 56%, said Australia should become a republic as soon as possible while 31% said it should happen after the Queen dies.

However, an opinion poll conducted in 2011 saw a sharp decline in the support for an Australian republic. The polling conducted by the Morgan Poll in May 2011 showed the support for the monarchy was now 55% (up 17% since 1999), whereas the support for a republic was at 34% (down 20%). The turnaround in support for a republic has been called the "strange death of Australian republicanism".

The Australian Broadcasting Corporation's Vote Compass during the 2013 Australian federal election found that 40.4% of respondents disagreed with the statement "Australia should end the monarchy and become a republic", whilst 38.1% agreed (23.1% strongly agreed) and 21.5% were neutral. Support for a republic was highest among those with a left-leaning political ideology. Younger people had the highest rate for those neutral towards the statement (27.8%) with their support for strongly agreed the lowest of all age groups at 17.1%. Support for a republic was highest in the Australian Capital Territory and Victoria and lowest in Queensland and Western Australia. More men than women said they support a republic.

In early 2014, a ReachTEL poll of 2,146 Australian conducted just after Australia Day showed only 39.4% supported a republic with 41.6% opposed. Lowest support was in the 65+ year cohort followed by the 18–34-year cohort. ARM chair Geoff Gallop said higher support for a republic among Generation X and baby boomer voters could be explained by them having participated in the 1999 referendum and remembering the 1975 constitutional crisis.

In April 2014, a poll found that "support for an Australian republic has slumped to its lowest level in more than three decades"; namely, on the eve of the visit to Australia by the Duke and Duchess of Cambridge, and Prince George, 42% of those polled agreed with the statement that "Australia should become a republic", whereas 51% opposed.

ARM commissioned a poll to be conducted by Essential Research from 5 to 8 November in 2015, asking "When Prince Charles becomes King of Australia, will you support or oppose replacing the British monarch with an Australian citizen as Australia's head of state?" Of the 1008 participants, 51% said they would prefer an Australian head of state to "King Charles", 27% opposed and 22% were undecided.

The Australian has polled the same question "Are you personally in favour or against Australia becoming a republic?" multiple times since 1999. After Australia Day 2016 they found 51% support. This level of support was similar to levels found between 1999 and 2003 by the same newspaper. Total against was 37% which was an increase over the rates polled in all previous polls other than 2011. Uncommitted at 12% was the lowest ever polled. However support for a republic was again lowest in the 18–34-year cohort.

In November 2018, Newspoll found support for a republic had collapsed to 40%. It was also the first time in their polling since the 1999 referendum that support for the monarchy was higher than a republic. A July 2020 YouGov poll found 62% of Australians believed Australia's head of state should be an Australian, not Queen Elizabeth II. An Ipsos poll in January 2021 found support for a republic was 34%, the lowest since 1979. However, one conducted by Ipsos in December 2022 (after the death of the Queen) showed support for a move to a republic had risen to 54%.

In October 2024, an opinion poll conducted by Roy Morgan, shortly after the King and Queen's royal tour, showed a dramatic increase in support for the monarchy, with 57% of respondents believing Australia should remain a monarchy.

In November 2025, following Prince Andrew's (now Andrew Mountbatten-Windsor) titles being removed by King Charles III, republican sentiment rose to 43% while Windsor's negative rating rose to 59%, while 61% of respondents wanted Windsor removed from the line of succession. 29% of respondents had a favourable view of King Charles. A total of 958 people were surveyed.

== Party political positions ==
Political party summary

Party	Position
Labor	Support
Liberal	Neutral
National	Oppose
Greens	Support
One Nation	Oppose
Socialist Alliance	Support
Democrats	Support

Republicanism has a level support in all major political parties. Most parties take a stance on this issue and have developed or implemented policy accordingly. The various positions are as follows:

=== Liberal–National Coalition ===
The Liberal Party espouses both conservative and classically liberal positions. It has no official position on the issue of monarchy, but both republicans and monarchists have held prominent positions within the party.

Proponents of republicanism in the Liberal Party include former prime minister and ARM leader Malcolm Turnbull, former prime minister Malcolm Fraser, former opposition leader John Hewson, former premiers Gladys Berejiklian (of NSW), Mike Baird (of NSW) and Jeff Kennett (of Victoria), former deputy leader Julie Bishop, and former federal treasurers Joe Hockey and Peter Costello.

Supporters of the status quo include former prime ministers Robert Menzies, Scott Morrison, Tony Abbott (who led Australians for Constitutional Monarchy from 1992 to 1994), John Howard (whose government oversaw the 1999 referendum) and former opposition leaders Peter Dutton, Alexander Downer and Brendan Nelson.

The National Party officially supports the status quo, but there have been some republicans within the party, such as former leader Tim Fischer. The Country Liberal Party also supports the status quo, but some republicans have been members of the party, including former leader Gary Higgins.

Under then prime minister John Howard, a monarchist, the government initiated a process to settle the republican debate, involving a constitutional convention and a referendum. Howard says the matter was resolved by the failure of the referendum.

=== Australian Labor Party ===
The Labor Party has supported constitutional change to become a republic since 1991 and has incorporated republicanism into its platform. Labor has proposed a series of plebiscites to restart the republican process. Along with this, Labor spokesperson (and former federal attorney general) Nicola Roxon has previously said that reform will "always fail if we seek to inflict a certain option on the public without their involvement. This time round, the people must shape the debate". In the 2019 federal election, Labor's platform included a two-stage referendum on a republic to be held during the next parliamentary term; however, Labor was defeated in the election.

Following Labor's win at the 2022 election, Matt Thistlethwaite was appointed Assistant Minister for the Republic in the First Albanese ministry, reporting to the Attorney-General. It the first time any person had held such a title. The position was abolished following a ministerial reshuffle in 2024.

=== Australian Greens ===
The Australian Greens are a strong proponent for an Australian republic, and this is reflected in the Greens "Constitutional Reform & Democracy" policy. In 2009, the Greens proposed legislation to hold a plebiscite on a republic at the 2010 federal election. The bill was subject to a Senate inquiry, which made no recommendation on the subject, and the proposal was subsequently dropped.

=== Democrats ===
The Australian Democrats, Australia's third party from the 1970s until the 2000s, strongly supported a move towards a republic through a system of an elected head of state through popular voting.

== Notable supporters ==
- Thomas Keneally, writer and founder of the Australian Republic Movement (ARM)
- Gough Whitlam, former prime minister (1972-1975)
- Malcolm Fraser, former prime minister (1975-1983)
- Bob Hawke, former prime minister (1983-1991)
- Paul Keating, former prime minister (1991-1996)
- Kim Beazley, former deputy prime minister and former governor of Western Australia
- Malcolm Turnbull, former chair of the ARM and former prime minister (2015-2019)
- Edward Smout, one of Australia's last surviving veterans of the First World War
- Geoff Gallop, former premier of Western Australia and former chair of the ARM
- Joe Hockey, former treasurer of Australia
- Rupert Murdoch, media business magnate
- Julia Gillard, former prime minister (2010-2013)
- Wayne Swan, former deputy prime minister and treasurer
- Peter FitzSimons, writer, broadcaster and former chair of the ARM
- Alan Joyce, former CEO of Qantas
- Gladys Berejiklian, former premier of New South Wales
- Marise Payne, former foreign minister
- Anthony Albanese, current prime minister
- Jim Saleam, political activist and founder of National Action.

== See also ==
- Australian Republic Movement (ARM)
- Australians for Constitutional Monarchy
- Australian Monarchist League
- Process model (Australia)
- Australian flag debate
- Australian head of state dispute
- Quebec sovereignty movement
- Monarchism in Australia
- Republicanism in Antigua and Barbuda
- Republicanism in the Bahamas
- Republicanism in Canada
- Republicanism in Jamaica
- Republicanism in New Zealand
- Republicanism in the United Kingdom
- Separation of church and state in Australia
