= 1999 Australian republic referendum =

Referendum on making Australia a republic

Republic question
- 6 November 1999
- A Proposed Law: To alter the Constitution to establish the Commonwealth of Australia as a republic with the Queen and Governor-General being replaced by a President appointed by a two-thirds majority of the members of the Commonwealth Parliament. Do you approve this proposed alteration?
- Outcome: Not passed. Australia remains a constitutional monarchy
- Website: Official results

Results
Choice	Votes	%
Yes	5,273,024	45.13%
No	6,410,787	54.87%
Valid votes	11,683,811	99.14%
Invalid or blank votes	101,189	0.86%
Total votes	11,785,000	100.00%
Registered voters/turnout	12,392,040	95.1%
- Results by state and territory
- Note: Saturation of colour denotes strength of the Yes (blue) or No (red) vote

Preamble question
- 6 November 1999
- A Proposed Law: To alter the Constitution to insert a preamble. Do you approve this proposed alteration?
- Outcome: Not passed
- Website: Official results

Results
Choice	Votes	%
Yes	4,591,563	39.34%
No	7,080,998	60.66%
Valid votes	11,672,561	99.05%
Invalid or blank votes	112,474	0.95%
Total votes	11,785,035	100.00%
Registered voters/turnout	12,392,040	95.1%

The Australian republic referendum held on 6 November 1999 was a two-question referendum to amend the Constitution of Australia. The first question asked whether Australia should become a republic, under a bi-partisan appointment model where the president would be appointed by the federal parliament with a two-thirds majority. This was the model that was endorsed by the Constitutional Convention, held in Canberra in February 1998. The second question, generally deemed to be far less important politically, asked whether Australia should alter the Constitution to insert a preamble.

Since the early 1990s opinion polls had suggested that a majority of the electorate favoured a republic in principle. Nonetheless, the republic referendum was defeated.

== Background ==
Australia is a constitutional monarchy under the Constitution of Australia adopted in 1901, with the duties of the monarch performed by a governor-general selected by the prime minister (although formally appointed by the monarch). Australian republicanism has existed since colonial times, though through much of the 20th century the monarchy remained popular. In the early 1990s, republicanism became an important political issue. Australian Labor Party (ALP) Prime Minister Paul Keating indicated a desire to instigate a republic in time for the centenary of the Federation of Australia in 2001. The opposition Liberal–National Coalition, led by Alexander Downer, though less supportive of the republic plan, promised to convene a constitutional convention to discuss the issue. Under John Howard, the Coalition won the 1996 federal election and set the Convention date for February 1998.

The 1998 Australian Constitutional Convention debated the need for a change to the Constitution of Australia which would abolish the Australian monarchy. The convention considered three categories of model for the selection of the head of state in an Australian republic: direct election, parliamentary election by a special majority, and appointment by a special council following prime ministerial nomination.

"In principle" agreement was reached by a majority of delegates for an Australian republic model (though a minority bloc of monarchists dissented). Additionally, delegates endorsed a republic under a bipartisan appointment model as preferable to the existing constitutional arrangements (monarchists and some direct-election republicans abstained from the vote). The Convention also almost unanimously recommended to the prime minister and parliament that the agreed upon model be "put to the people" in a referendum to be held in 1999.

== Division of electorate ==
The majority of analysis has advanced two main reasons for the referendum defeat:

First, Australians have traditionally been apprehensive about proposed constitutional change. Before 1999, only eight of the 44 proposals put to a referendum, (Note: Handbook of the 44th Parliament (2014) "Part 5 - Referendums and Plebiscites - Referendum results". Parliamentary Library of Australia.) have been approved by the constitutionally required double majority – that is, (1) a majority in each of a majority of the six states and (2) a majority nationally. As Sir Robert Menzies explained following his failure to pass a referendum to ban the communist party, "to get an affirmative vote from the Australian people on a referendum proposal is one of the labours of Hercules".

Second, public opinion varied widely on the issue, and was not a simple positive or negative reaction. The major opinion groups were:

- Traditional monarchists who held their beliefs largely on principled and/or sentimental attachment to the monarchy, in part based on traditional associations with the United Kingdom, the Commonwealth of Nations and a personal identification with Queen Elizabeth II and her family. Many were older or from rural rather than urban areas.
- Pragmatic monarchists who maintained that, whatever the alleged or actual weaknesses of the current system, it also had many alleged or actual strengths. The view of this group was that constitutional monarchy provides the basis for stable democratic government, with the Governor-General (the monarch's nominal representative) acting as an impartial, non-political umpire of the political process. Many distrusted the Australian political classes and believed the provision of executive powers to a local politician would result in an undesirably partisan head of state, instability, dictatorship, or a possible repeat of the 1975 Australian constitutional crisis.
- Minimal change republicans who aimed to remove the monarchy, but otherwise maintain the current system as unchanged as possible, thus creating a parliamentary republic. Within this group, there were a small group of supporters of the ultra-minimalist McGarvie Model, but generally the favoured model of these groups was appointment by a two-thirds majority of a joint sitting of Parliament.
- Progressive republicans who wanted a popularly elected head of state.
- Radical republicans who saw the minimal change option as purely cosmetic, and desired comprehensive revision to the current Westminster-based system and possibly the implementation of a presidential or semi-presidential system. This was easily the smallest major group, but prominent in the debate.
- Tactical voters who took a long-term view and voted against their inclinations to avoid more radical changes in the future. Some traditional and pragmatic monarchists perceived a weight of inevitability and voted "yes" to the minimalist republic to avoid a more radical republic. Some sentimental republicans voted "no" in the hope of a more radical or populist proposal winning a future referendum.
- The uncommitted. As in all elections, a proportion of the electorate remained unattached to either side. Uncommitted swinging voters can be a decisive force in shaping election and referendum results, especially as Australia has compulsory voting.

=== Alternative methods for selecting a president ===
The process for change is seen as an important factor for the eventual outcome in a referendum. There were several other proposals for selecting a president:

- Election
  - by the federal Parliament alone
  - by federal and state Parliaments (as in India)
  - by a popular vote (as in Ireland)
- Selection
  - by the Prime Minister
  - by consensus among the Government and Opposition
  - by a constitutional council (known as the McGarvie Model)

Different groups within the republican cause expressed views as to which model was preferable. Some were committed to one option exclusively.

== The two sides ==
=== The "Yes" side ===
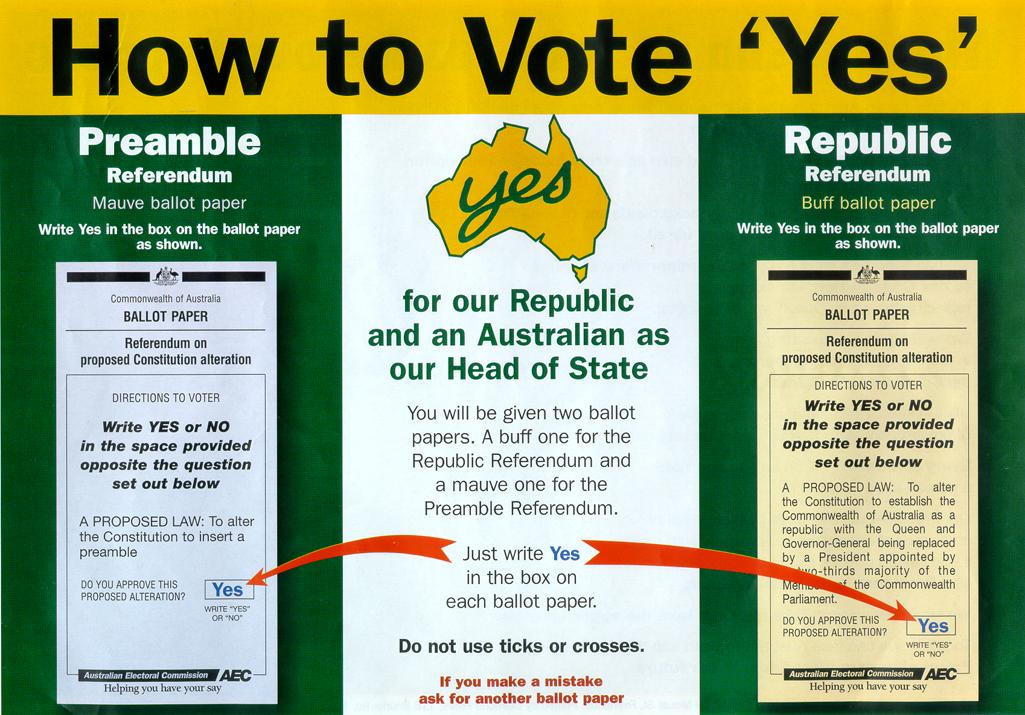
How-to-vote card for the "Yes" side.

The "Yes" campaign was headed by Malcolm Turnbull. It was notable for unlikely alliances between traditional opponents—for example, former Labor Prime Minister Gough Whitlam and former Liberal Prime Minister Malcolm Fraser gave joint statements. Many other prominent Australians also endorsed the "Yes" vote, which led to claims that the movement was "elitist" in sentiment and supported by politicians rather than the public at large. Viewing the case for a republic as fairly self-evident and broadly supported by the Australian populace, their advertising concentrated mainly on the positive symbolism of the republican case. The "Yes" campaign was also viewed as having the support of the popular Australian media by British politician and journalist Bill Deedes who said in The Daily Telegraph in 1999: "I have rarely attended elections in any country, certainly not a democratic one, in which the newspapers have displayed more shameless bias. One and all, they determined that Australians should have a republic and they used every device towards that end".

=== The "No" side ===
The organised "No" campaign was led by a mixture of monarchist groups alongside some republican groups who did not feel that the proposed model was satisfactory; in particular, they thought that the people should elect the president. Headed by Kerry Jones, the "No" campaign concentrated on the perceived flaws of the model on offer, claiming that those who supported the "Yes" push were "elites" (although many leading figures on the monarchist side also had "elite" backgrounds), and managed to appeal both to those apprehensive about the change and to those feeling that the model did not go far enough. Their advertising emphasised voting "No" to "this republic", implying to direct-election supporters that a model more to their preferences was likely to be put in the future.

The common elements within the "No" campaign were the view that the model proposed was undemocratic and would lead to a "politician's republic", playing to a general distrust of politicians. "No" campaigners called for further consultation, while remaining non-specific on what steps were needed to ensure this.

== Constitutional Convention ==
The model with an appointed head of state was the one endorsed by the Constitutional Convention and put forward at the referendum. It was broadly supported by both minimalist and establishment republicans, including almost all Labor and some conservative politicians. Direct election republicans in the general community opposed the indirect elected model urging people to vote against the referendum. It was opposed by monarchists of both kinds.

Voting at the convention was recorded in Hansard. Hansard shows that 73 delegates voted in favour, 57 against and 22 abstained. Not one constitutional monarchist delegate voted in favour. The policy of ACM and other monarchist groups was to oppose all republican models, including the minimalist McGarvie model. Some conservatives argued that this would be the easiest model to defeat in a referendum and therefore should be supported at the convention. Had the monarchists followed this advice, the McGarvie model would have prevailed at the convention. A number of republicans who supported direct election abstained from the vote (such as Ted Mack, Phil Cleary, Clem Jones and Andrew Gunter), thereby allowing the bi-partisan model to succeed. They reasoned that the model would be defeated at a referendum, and then a second referendum called with direct election as the model.

Although the motion was passed with a simple majority (excluding abstentions), the referendum model did not pass with an absolute majority (less than half of the total delegates supported the motion), a condition which the prime minister had indicated for a referendum. Because the model was overwhelmingly supported by the republican delegates, the prime minister decided to put that model to the referendum, a decision acclaimed by the ARM delegates and the media.

== Questions ==
=== Republic question ===
Electors were asked whether they approved of:

A proposed law: To alter the Constitution to establish the Commonwealth of Australia as a republic with the Queen and Governor-General being replaced by a President appointed by a two-thirds majority of the members of the Commonwealth Parliament.

=== Preamble question ===
Electors were also asked to vote on a second question at the 1999 referendum which asked whether they approved of:

A proposed law: To alter the Constitution to insert a preamble.

The preamble would have been:

With hope in God, the Commonwealth of Australia is constituted as a democracy with a federal system of government to serve the common good.

We the Australian people commit ourselves to this Constitution:

proud that our national unity has been forged by Australians from many ancestries;

never forgetting the sacrifices of all who defended our country and our liberty in time of war;

upholding freedom, tolerance, individual dignity and the rule of law;

honouring Aborigines and Torres Strait Islanders, the nation’s first people, for their deep kinship with their lands and for their ancient and continuing cultures which enrich the life of our country;

recognising the nation-building contribution of generations of immigrants;

mindful of our responsibility to protect our unique natural environment;

supportive of achievement as well as equality of opportunity for all;

and valuing independence as dearly as the national spirit which binds us together in both adversity and success.

== Results ==
Section 128 of the Constitution requires a "double majority" in a referendum to approve a constitutional amendment—a majority of votes in each of a majority of the states (i.e. at least four of the six), and a majority of all the electors voting. Voters in the territories, as they do not live in states, count only towards the second of those majorities.

11,785,000 votes were cast, representing a voter turnout of 95.10%. Of these, approximately 101,189 (0.86%) were informal, and not counted.

=== Republic ===
Result
State	Electoral roll	Ballots issued	For		Against		Informal
State	Electoral roll	Ballots issued	Vote	%	Vote	%	Informal
New South Wales	4,146,653	3,948,714	1,817,380	46.43	2,096,562	53.57	34,772
Victoria	3,164,843	3,016,737	1,489,536	49.84	1,499,138	50.16	28,063
Queensland	2,228,377	2,108,694	784,060	37.44	1,309,992	62.56	14,642
Western Australia	1,176,311	1,114,326	458,306	41.48	646,520	58.52	9,500
South Australia	1,027,392	986,394	425,869	43.57	551,575	56.43	8,950
Tasmania	327,729	315,641	126,271	40.37	186,513	59.63	2,857
Australian Capital Territory (Note: Following the 1977 referendum, votes cast in the territories count towards the national total, but are not counted toward any state total.)	212,586	202,614	127,211	63.27	73,850	36.73	1,553
Northern Territory	108,149	91,880	44,391	48.77	46,637	51.23	852
National total	12,392,040	11,785,000	5,273,024	45.13	6,410,787	54.87	101,189
Results	Obtained a majority in no state and an overall minority of 1,137,763 votes. Not carried						

=== Preamble ===
Result
State	Electoral roll	Ballots issued	For		Against		Informal
State	Electoral roll	Ballots issued	Vote	%	Vote	%	Informal
New South Wales	4,146,653	3,948,482	1,647,378	42.14	2,261,960	57.86	39,144
Victoria	3,164,843	3,016,716	1,268,044	42.46	1,718,331	57.54	30,341
Queensland	2,228,377	2,108,659	686,644	32.81	1,405,841	67.19	16,174
Western Australia	1,176,311	1,114,455	383,477	34.73	720,542	65.27	10,436
South Australia	1,027,392	986,535	371,965	38.10	604,245	61.90	10,325
Tasmania	327,729	315,664	111,415	35.67	200,906	64.33	3,343
Australian Capital Territory	212,586	202,618	87,629	43.61	113,293	56.39	1,696
Northern Territory	108,149	91,906	35,011	38.52	55,880	61.48	1,015
National total	12,392,040	11,785,035	4,591,563	39.34	7,080,998	60.66	112,474
Results	Obtained a majority in no state and an overall minority of 2,489,435 votes. Not carried						

=== Analysis of results ===
Both propositions failed on both of the voting requirements. There was no majority for "Yes" in any state, where the "Yes" vote for the republic ranged from 37.44% in Queensland to 49.84% in Victoria, and for the preamble ranged from 32.81% in Queensland to 42.46% in Victoria. Overall, 54.87% voted "No" to the republic, and 60.66% to the preamble.

The highest "Yes" votes for the republic came from inner metropolitan areas. Of Australia's 148 divisions, 42 voted "Yes", with Melbourne (70.92%), Sydney (67.85%), Melbourne Ports (65.90%), Grayndler (64.77%) and Fraser (64.46%) registering the highest "Yes" votes at division level. Sydney, Melbourne, Canberra and Hobart voted in favour of the proposition for Australia to become a republic, in contrast to "No" votes in Adelaide, Brisbane, Gold Coast, Perth, Newcastle and Townsville. Votes in opposition to the proposal came predominantly from rural and remote divisions, as well as many outer suburban areas. The four divisions recording the highest "No" vote were in Queensland: Maranoa 77.16%, Blair 74.64%, Wide Bay 74.33% and Groom 72.58%. Gwydir in rural New South Wales recorded the fifth-highest vote against the republic, with 72.21% level.

== Aftermath ==
With republican models of one form or another winning a majority in opinion polls prior to the referendum, it was expected that the republic referendum would pass. However, the question put was for a particular model of republic with a head of state appointed by Parliament. This was opposed by some supporters of a republic, who preferred a directly elected head of state. Some of these, such as Phil Cleary, advocated that republic supporters vote "No" in order that a future referendum could be put on the directly elected model. Some commentators—including the president of the Australian Republican Movement, Malcolm Turnbull—identified this split within the republican camp as a key reason for the referendum's failure.

After the referendum, Malcolm Turnbull blamed Prime Minister John Howard in particular for the defeat and claimed: "Whatever else he achieves, history will remember him for only one thing. He was the Prime Minister who broke a nation's heart." Meanwhile, the leader of Australians for Constitutional Monarchy, Kerry Jones, called for citizens to accept the result and go forward "as a united nation". Later in 2006, Turnbull stated that the ARM had ultimately made the right choices, but that the referendum failed because Australians did not support indirect election and it would have been irresponsible for the ARM to have supported a direct election model. Despite the hopes of more radical republicans such as Phil Cleary, the referendum defeat was generally viewed as a setback for the republican cause and calls for another referendum were ignored by the Howard government.

The Queen visited Australia the year following the referendum in 2000. During a speech she stated that "I respect and accept the outcome of the referendum. In the light of the result last November, I shall continue faithfully to serve as Queen of Australia under the Constitution to the very best of my ability".

High Court Justice Michael Kirby, a constitutional monarchist, ascribed the failure of the republic referendum to ten factors: lack of bi-partisanship; undue haste; a perception that the republic was supported by big city elites; a "denigration" of monarchists as "unpatriotic" by republicans; the adoption of an inflexible republican model by the convention; concerns about the specific model proposed (chiefly the ease with which a prime minister could dismiss a president); a republican strategy of using big "names" attached to the Whitlam era to promote their cause; strong opposition to the proposal in the smaller states; a counter-productive pro-republican bias in the media; and an instinctive caution among the Australian electorate regarding constitutional change.

The Gillard Labor government, which took power in a hung parliament following the August 2010 election, indicated an intention not to revisit the issue of a vote for an Australian republic during the reign of Queen Elizabeth II. The Liberal-National Coalition government in power following the September 2013 federal election was led by Tony Abbott who is a supporter of the constitutional monarchy. During Abbott's term as prime minister, Labor Opposition Leader Bill Shorten stated he believed it was time to "breathe new life into the dream of an Australian republic".

On 15 September 2015, Malcolm Turnbull, who had been chairman of the Australian Republican Movement from 1993 until 2000, succeeded Tony Abbott as leader of the Liberal Party, to become the prime minister of Australia. For the first time, the prime minister and the federal Opposition Leader, as well as the eight state and territory premiers and chief ministers, were all self-declared republicans. Turnbull has stated that he believes Australia should become a republic after the reign of Queen Elizabeth II. Turnbull was later succeeded, on 24 August 2018, by Scott Morrison, who subsequently declared himself a constitutional monarchist, and re-hung a portrait of the Queen in the Prime Minister's office, which Turnbull had removed. Anthony Albanese, who was sworn in as prime minister in May 2022, is a convinced republican, going as far to appoint an Assistant Minister for the Republic. However, with the death of Queen Elizabeth II in September 2022, Albanese announced that he would not organise a referendum during his first term in office, out of respect for the late Queen Elizabeth II. The Assistant Minister for the Republic position was not retained in the 2024 Cabinet reshuffle.

== See also ==
- Republicanism in Australia
- Monarchy of Australia
- 1980 Quebec referendum
- 1995 Quebec referendum
- 1995 Bermudian independence referendum
- 2002 Gibraltar sovereignty referendum
- 2008 Tuvaluan constitutional referendum
- 2009 Saint Vincent and the Grenadines constitutional referendum
- 2013 Falkland Islands sovereignty referendum
- 2014 Scottish independence referendum
- 2015–2016 New Zealand flag referendums
- 2016 United Kingdom European Union membership referendum
- 2023 Australian Indigenous Voice referendum
