= Malcolm Turnbull =

Prime Minister of Australia from 2015 to 2018

The Honourable Malcolm Turnbull AC
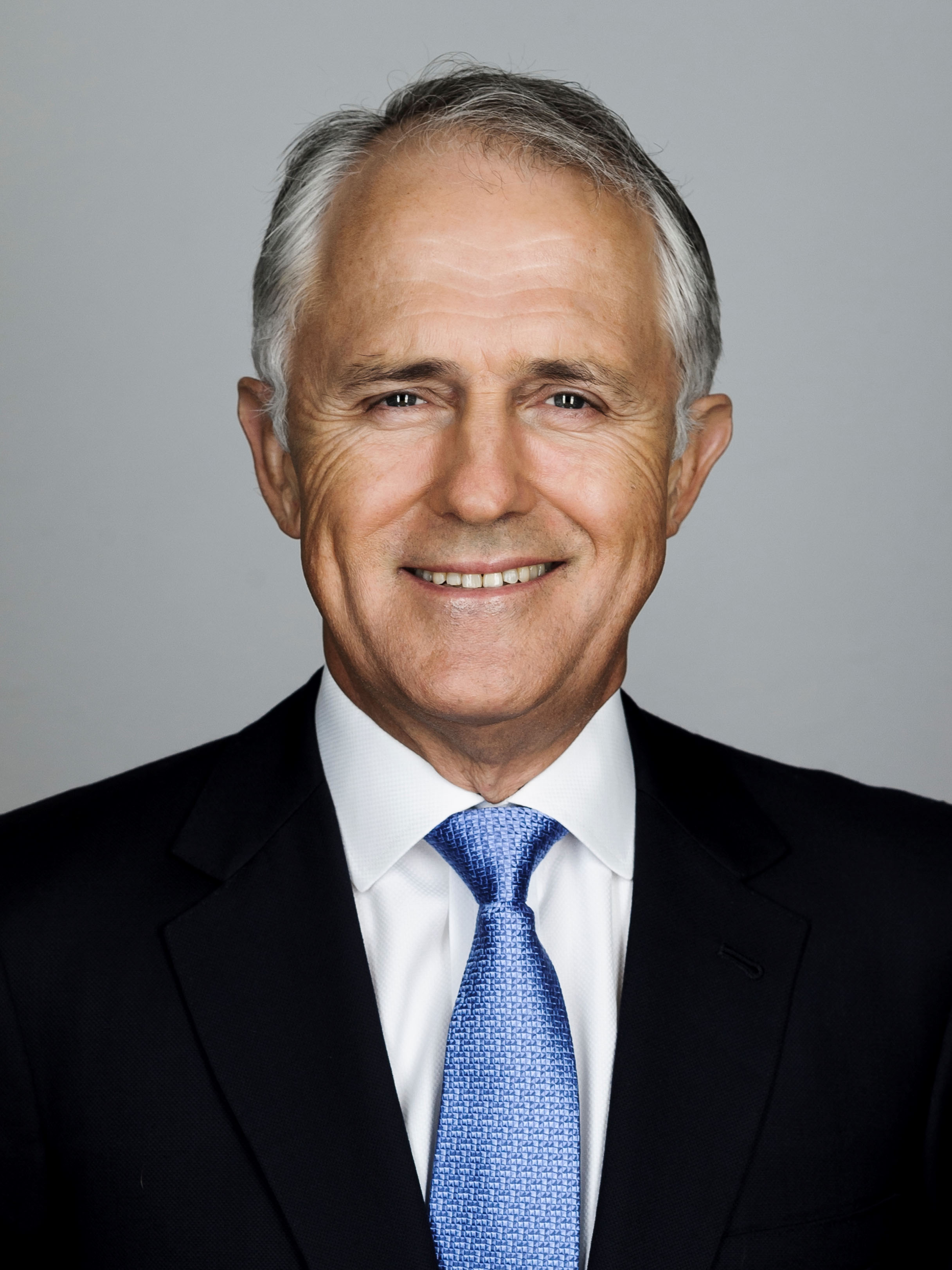
- Official portrait, 2015

29th Prime Minister of Australia
- In office 15 September 2015 – 24 August 2018
- Monarch: Elizabeth II
- Governor General: Sir Peter Cosgrove
- Deputy: Warren Truss; Barnaby Joyce; Michael McCormack
- Preceded by: Tony Abbott
- Succeeded by: Scott Morrison

Leader of the Opposition
- In office 16 September 2008 – 1 December 2009
- Prime Minister: Kevin Rudd
- Deputy: Julie Bishop
- Preceded by: Brendan Nelson
- Succeeded by: Tony Abbott

12th Leader of the Liberal Party
- In office 14 September 2015 – 24 August 2018
- Deputy: Julie Bishop
- Preceded by: Tony Abbott
- Succeeded by: Scott Morrison
- In office 16 September 2008 – 1 December 2009
- Deputy: Julie Bishop
- Preceded by: Brendan Nelson
- Succeeded by: Tony Abbott
Ministerial positions
Minister for Communications
In office 18 September 2013 – 14 September 2015
Prime Minister	Tony Abbott
Preceded by	Anthony Albanese
Succeeded by	Mitch Fifield
Minister for the Environment and Water
In office 30 January 2007 – 3 December 2007
Prime Minister	John Howard
Preceded by	Ian Campbell
Succeeded by	Peter Garrett

Member of the Australian Parliament for Wentworth
- In office 9 October 2004 – 31 August 2018
- Preceded by: Peter King
- Succeeded by: Kerryn Phelps

Chairman of the Australian Republican Movement
- In office November 1993 – 20 September 2000
- Preceded by: Tom Keneally
- Succeeded by: Greg Barns

Personal details
- Born: Malcolm Bligh Turnbull; 24 October 1954 (age 72) Sydney, New South Wales, Australia
- Party: Liberal
- Other political affiliations: Coalition
- Spouse: Lucy Hughes (m. 1980)
- Children: 2
- Parent(s): Bruce Turnbull; Coral Lansbury
- Relatives: Angela Lansbury (second cousin once removed)
- Education: Vaucluse Public School; Sydney Grammar St Ives Preparatory School; Sydney Grammar School
- Alma mater: University of Sydney (BA, LLB); Brasenose College, Oxford (BCL)
- Profession: Barrister; businessman; politician
- Cabinet: Turnbull ministry I; II; Turnbull shadow ministry
- Website: Official website

Malcolm Bligh Turnbull (born 24 October 1954) is an Australian former politician, businessman and barrister who served as the 29th prime minister of Australia from 2015 to 2018. He held office as leader of the Liberal Party from 2008 to 2009 and again from 2015 to 2018, and was the member of parliament (MP) for the New South Wales division of Wentworth from 2004 to 2018.

Born in Sydney, Turnbull graduated from the University of Sydney as a Bachelor of Arts and a Bachelor of Laws, before attending Brasenose College, Oxford, as a Rhodes Scholar, earning a Bachelor of Civil Law degree. For more than two decades, he worked as a journalist, lawyer, merchant banker, and venture capitalist. He was Chair of the Australian Republican Movement from 1993 to 2000, and was one of the leaders of the unsuccessful "Yes" campaign in the 1999 republic referendum. He was first elected to the Australian House of Representatives as a member of parliament (MP) for the division of Wentworth in New South Wales at the 2004 election, and was Minister for the Environment and Water in the Howard government from January 2007 until December 2007.

After coming second in the 2007 leadership election, Turnbull won the leadership of the Liberal Party in a leadership spill the following year and became Leader of the Opposition. However, his support of the Carbon Pollution Reduction Scheme proposed by the Rudd government in December 2009 led in turn to a leadership challenge by Tony Abbott, who defeated Turnbull by a single vote. Though initially planning to leave politics after this, Turnbull chose to remain and was later appointed Minister for Communications in the Abbott government following the Liberal-National Coalition's victory at the 2013 election.

Two years later, citing consistently poor opinion polling, Turnbull resigned from the Cabinet on 14 September 2015 and challenged Abbott, successfully reclaiming the leadership of the Liberal Party by ten votes. He was sworn in as prime minister the following day. The Turnbull government initiated the National Innovation and Science Agenda as its key economic priority, working to promote STEM education, increase venture capital funding for new start-ups, and launch an "ideas boom". Turnbull also pursued "city deals" with local and state governments to improve planning outcomes and encourage investment in major infrastructure projects such as the Western Sydney Airport. In 2016, Turnbull led the Coalition to a narrow victory in a double dissolution election. In his second term, Turnbull initiated and campaigned for the "Yes" side in the same-sex marriage plebiscite, which was ultimately successful. Turnbull also announced Snowy Hydro 2.0, a major expansion of the Snowy Mountains Scheme as a key component in enabling the transition to renewable energy. In late 2017, the government experienced a parliamentary eligibility crisis that saw fifteen parliamentarians forced out of Parliament due to concerns about dual citizenship.

To address climate change and reform energy policy, in August 2018 Turnbull proposed the National Energy Guarantee. Although initially agreed to by the Cabinet, the policy was ultimately rejected by the party room. This, combined with poor opinion polling, caused a leadership crisis with Peter Dutton challenging Turnbull to a leadership spill for the Liberal leadership. Although Turnbull defeated Dutton in the ballot, a majority of MPs demanded a second spill, which Turnbull did not contest. On 24 August 2018, Scott Morrison defeated Dutton and Julie Bishop in the contest, and replaced Turnbull as prime minister. Turnbull resigned from Parliament, triggering a by-election in his former seat of Wentworth. The Liberal Party lost the by-election to independent candidate Kerryn Phelps, which resulted in the Coalition losing its absolute majority in the House of Representatives.

Since retiring from politics, Turnbull has become an advisor to Kasada, an Australian cybersecurity start-up. He has since been critical of the direction of the Liberal Party, and has joined with his former opponent Kevin Rudd in criticising the dominance of Rupert Murdoch's News Corp in Australian political debate.

== Early life and education ==
Malcolm Bligh Turnbull was born in Sydney, on 24 October 1954, the only child of Bruce Bligh Turnbull and Coral Magnolia Lansbury. His father was a hotel broker, while his mother was a radio actor, writer, and academic, and a third cousin of the British film and television actress Angela Lansbury. His maternal grandmother, May Lansbury (née Morle), was born in England, while his other grandparents were Australian-born. He is also of Scottish descent; his great-great-great-grandfather John Turnbull (1751–1834) arrived on the Coromandel in 1802 in New South Wales and became a tailor. In an interview in 2015, Turnbull said that his middle name "Bligh" has been a family tradition for generations, originally given in honour of Governor William Bligh. Turnbull's parents married in December 1955, fourteen months after his birth. The Turnbulls lived in a two-bedroom flat in Vaucluse, where Turnbull would attend the nearby public school. Bruce and Coral's marriage was an unhappy one, and Turnbull wrote that the couple rarely slept or spent time together, only staying married due to himself. Coral frequently belittled her husband about his lack of education and that the fortunes of the family depended on her. Coral started spending increasing amounts of time with John Salmon, a professor of history at the University of New South Wales. When Turnbull was nine, Salmon received a teaching post in New Zealand, and Coral went with him, ending the marriage. Bruce told Turnbull that Coral was studying for another degree, which although Coral did get a PhD in New Zealand, was an effort by Bruce to hide the fact that Coral had left him. Turnbull was from then raised solely by his father. Turnbull suffered from asthma as a young child.

After spending his first three years of schooling at Vaucluse Public School, he started boarding at Sydney Grammar School in St Ives. Turnbull wrote that he hated boarding school, as he was bullied due to bed wetting. Bruce, now a single father, had troubles paying school fees, causing many letters to be sent to the Turnbull residence from the school bursar. These financial issues forced the Turnbulls to move from Vaucluse to a small flat in Double Bay, where they lived without much furniture. Turnbull then began to attend Grammar's high school campus on College Street, on a partial scholarship. During this time he lived at the school's former Randwick boarding facilities. Also during this time Bruce remarried, and his business continued to grow. The Turnbulls moved into a large apartment in Point Piper, and the pressure of the school fees was relieved. Although a mediocre mathematician, Turnbull excelled in Greek, English, and History, and joined the debating and drama clubs, where he won the Lawrence Campbell Oratory Competition and starred in numerous Shakespeare plays, respectively. He was made senior school co-captain in 1972, however, contrary to certain sources, Turnbull was not the dux of his graduating year at Sydney Grammar. In 1987, in memory of his late father, he set up the Bruce Turnbull means-tested scholarship at Sydney Grammar, offering full remission of fees to a student unable to afford them.

In 1973, Turnbull attended the University of Sydney, graduating with a Bachelor of Arts in political science in 1977 and a Bachelor of Laws in 1978. Turnbull wrote for the school's newspaper, Honi Soit, writing largely about politics. Turnbull also visited former Premier of New South Wales Jack Lang, discussing 1920s and 1930s state politics. During his studies, he was involved in student politics, serving as board director of the University of Sydney Union and a member of the Students' Representative Council. He also worked part-time as a political journalist for Nation Review, Radio 2SM and Channel 9, covering state politics. Around this time, Turnbull would meet businessman Kerry Packer, for whom he would later do extensive legal work.

In 1978, Turnbull won a Rhodes Scholarship and attended Brasenose College, Oxford, where he briefly studied for a business degree before switching to a postgraduate Bachelor of Civil Law from 1978 to 1980, graduating with honours. While at Oxford, he worked for The Sunday Times and contributed to newspapers and magazines in both the United States and Australia. He befriended the future UK prime minister Theresa May, who credits Turnbull for encouraging her husband Philip May to propose to her. Turnbull also met his future wife, Lucy, during this time. During Turnbull's time at Oxford, a university don wrote of him that he was "always going to enter life's rooms without knocking".

== Professional career ==
=== Costigan commission ===
After graduating from Oxford, Turnbull returned to Australia and began working as a barrister. He was general counsel and secretary for Australian Consolidated Press Holdings Group from 1983 to 1985. During this time, he defended Kerry Packer against the "Goanna" allegations made by the Costigan Commission, accusing Packer of the murder of bank manager Ian Coote, among other crimes. The Commission believed that Packer had committed the murder to hide other criminal activities. Turnbull attempted to use the press to goad the counsel assisting the commission, Douglas Meagher QC, into suing him and Packer for a 6000-word statement intentionally defamatory of Costigan and Meagher, accusing them of being "unjust, capricious, dishonest and malicious". The statement worked, and it was printed in full in many newspapers, increasing public opinion of Packer. Turnbull later advised Packer to sue Meagher for defamation, an action that was struck down by Justice David Hunt as being an abuse of process, saying that Turnbull had managed "to poison the fountain of justice". These tactics made Turnbull enemies within the NSW Bar Association, leading to Turnbull's departure from that organisation. After the findings of the Costigan Commission were handed down, accusing Packer of tax evasion, drug trafficking and murder, Turnbull phoned Premier of Queensland Joh Bjelke-Petersen, requesting an inquest into the Commission's findings. Bjelke-Petersen agreed to hold the inquest, which refuted the Costigan Commission's allegations that Packer had committed murder.

=== Spycatcher trial ===
In partnership with Bruce McWilliam, he established his own law firm, Turnbull McWilliam. During 1986, Turnbull defended Peter Wright, a former MI5 official who wrote the book Spycatcher, detailing his work for the spy agency during the Cold War. The British government had obtained an injunction to stop the book's sale, and wanted to do the same in Australia. Turnbull argued that the book had nothing new in it, that other books with never-before-seen confidential information had been allowed by the British government with minimal changes while wanting to restrict a different book, and that the government had lied to the court through the trial. The case was successful after going through the New South Wales Court of Appeal, stopping the British government's attempts to suppress the book's publication in Australia. The case was widely reported, making Turnbull a public figure in Australia and the United Kingdom, and causing the book to sell over 2 million copies in Australia. Turnbull later wrote a book on the trial, titled The Spycatcher Trial.

"The fact of the matter is that nothing is achieved in this world, particularly politically, other than with persistence, and persistence involves repetition and it involves argument and re-argument... The public interest in free speech is not just in truthful speech, in correct speech, in fair speech... The interest is in the debate. You see, every person who has ultimately changed the course of history has started off being unpopular." Turnbull's closing submissions, 18 December 1986

=== Other legal work ===
In 1987, Turnbull established an investment banking firm, Whitlam Turnbull & Co Ltd, in partnership with Neville Wran, the former Labor Premier of New South Wales, and Nicholas Whitlam, the former Chief Executive of the State Bank of New South Wales and the son of former Labor Prime Minister Gough Whitlam. Whitlam parted company with the firm in 1990; it operated as Turnbull & Partners Ltd until 1997.

Turnbull left the firm he co-founded in 1997 to become a managing director of Goldman Sachs Australia, eventually becoming a partner in Goldman Sachs and Co. Additionally, he worked as a director of Star Technology Systems from 1993 to 1995. During this period, in the mid-1990s, he was also involved in the formation and early development of the Caijiaying zinc project in Hebei, China through the establishment of the Hebei Hua Ao joint venture, in which he and associated partners held a financial interest during its initial structuring and investment phase.

Turnbull purchased a stake in the internet service provider OzEmail in 1994 for $500,000. He sold this stake several months before the dot com bubble burst in 1999 for $57 million to then-telecommunications giant MCI Worldcom.

In May 2002, Turnbull appeared before the HIH Insurance royal commission to be questioned on Goldman Sachs's involvement in the possible privatisation of one of the acquisitions of the collapsed insurance company. The Royal Commissioner's report made no adverse findings against him or Goldman Sachs, however, Turnbull was one of nine defendants who settled later litigation over the collapse in undisclosed payments, thought to be worth as much as $500m.

== Early political involvement ==
In 1981, Turnbull stood for Liberal Party preselection in the Division of Wentworth prior to the 1981 Wentworth by-election. He was defeated by Peter Coleman, who went on to win the seat. In 1982, following his retirement from politics, former prime minister William McMahon nominated Turnbull as his preferred successor in Lowe; the Liberals chose another candidate, and lost the by-election to Labor. Turnbull later attempted preselection in the safe state seat of Mosman in 1983, losing to Phillip Smiles. He let his membership of the Liberal Party lapse in 1986, before rejoining in 2000. Turnbull was made Federal Treasurer of the Liberal Party in 2000, and was a member of the party's federal and New South Wales executives from 2002 to 2003. He also spent time as a director of the Menzies Research Centre, the Liberal Party's research centre.

=== Australian Republican Movement ===
In 1993, Turnbull was appointed by Prime Minister Paul Keating as Chair of the Republic Advisory Committee, charged with exploring ways of moving Australia to a republican form of government by replacing the Queen of Australia with an elected Australian head of state. Later that year, Turnbull became Chair of the Australian Republican Movement, a position he would hold until 2000. He was an elected delegate at the 1998 Australian Constitutional Convention in Canberra. At the convention, Turnbull cautioned against mixing the roles of president and prime minister, advocating a parliamentary republic, and supported the bi-partisan appointment republican model adopted by the convention.

Turnbull was an active campaigner in the unsuccessful 1999 referendum to establish an Australian republic, serving as Chair of the Yes Committee. He published a book on the campaign, titled Fighting for the Republic. When the referendum failed, he accused incumbent prime minister and monarchist John Howard of "breaking the nation's heart". Turnbull retired from the Australian Republican Movement in 2000, having already left the board of Ausflag in 1994; he joined the Australian National Flag Association in 2004.

=== Choice of political party ===
Turnbull has had a long affiliation with the Liberal Party of Australia throughout his career. During his time in the Australian Republican Movement however, he considered running for preselection for the Australian Labor Party. Turnbull's mother was close friends with Premier of New South Wales Neville Wran and Senator Lionel Murphy, who had briefly dated her in university. Both men were members of the Labor Party. Turnbull himself was also friends with another Labor premier, Bob Carr. In 2015, it was revealed that Turnbull had held talks with Labor state politician John Della Bosca during the 1990s on a possible party switch, and that he had harboured aspirations in his youth to head the Australian Workers' Union, which is linked with the Labor Party. The accusation, made by former Labor Foreign Minister Bob Carr, was cited by Labor Leader Bill Shorten during the Royal Commission into Trade Union Governance and Corruption.

== Howard government ==
=== Entry to parliament ===
In 2000, Turnbull intended to seek Liberal preselection for Wentworth but did not eventually contest after concluding that preselection hopeful Peter King had the numbers in the branches. In 2003, Turnbull announced that he would challenge King for the seat and successfully defeated him to become the Liberal candidate. During what was a bitter preselection campaign, King accused Turnbull of branch stacking, by having local members transferring their membership to a branch that would decide the pre-selection, what King referred to as "branch stripping".

Following his preselection loss, King stood against Turnbull at the 2004 federal election as an independent candidate. As a result, the traditionally safe Liberal seat became an electoral wildcard, the contest becoming a three-person race between Turnbull, King and the Labor candidate David Patch. During the campaign, Turnbull spent over A$600,000 on his campaign. While the Liberal primary vote eventually fell by 10.3% to a total 41.8%, King received only 18% of the primary vote with a 57%/43% Liberal/Labor preference split which meant Turnbull was elected, albeit on a reduced 55.5% two-party vote after a 2.4% swing. The result meant that Wentworth was classified as a marginal seat for the first time since the 1993 federal election.

=== Cabinet Minister ===
Announcing a cabinet reshuffle on 24 January 2006, Prime Minister John Howard promoted Turnbull from the backbench to the role of parliamentary secretary, giving him special responsibility for water at the height of the 2000s Australian drought. On 26 September 2006, Howard announced the creation of a new Office of Water Resources, sitting within the Department of the Prime Minister and Cabinet, to address the problem of drought in Australia; Turnbull was given responsibility for this office.

In January 2007, Howard promoted Turnbull to the Cabinet as Minister for the Environment and Water. In this position, Turnbull approved a proposed A$1.7 billion Bell Bay Pulp Mill in north Tasmania, near Launceston. Turnbull's approval of the Bell Bay Pulp Mill project of Gunns came on 4 October 2007 and followed a report by the government's chief scientist Jim Peacock on the project's potential environmental impact, which required the project to meet 48 "strict environmental" conditions.

In February 2007, Turnbull was criticised for claiming a government allowance of A$175 a night and paying it to his wife as rent while living in a townhouse owned by her in Canberra.

During the 2007 federal election campaign, Turnbull announced that if re-elected the government would contribute A$10 million to the investigation of an untried Russian technology that aims to trigger rainfall from the atmosphere, even when there are no clouds. The Australian Rain Corporation presented research documents written in Russian, explained by a Russian researcher who spoke to local experts in Russian. Although Turnbull claimed that the Australian Rain Corporation was Australian-based, investigations revealed that it was 75% Swiss-owned. It was also revealed that a prominent stakeholder in the Australian Rain Corporation, Matt Handbury, is a nephew of Rupert Murdoch. Turnbull refused to answer questions regarding Handbury's contribution to the Wentworth Forum, the main fund-raising organisation for Turnbull's 2007 election campaign.

== Opposition ==
=== Aftermath of 2007 election ===
Turnbull retained his seat at the 2007 federal election with a two-party vote 1.3% swing in Wentworth, despite a 5.6% swing away from the Coalition in the state, and a 5.4% swing against them nationwide. After John Howard lost his seat of Bennelong, on 25 November 2007 Peter Costello, who Howard stated publicly should succeed him, announced he would not seek the party leadership. Turnbull declared his candidacy later that same day, and was considered by the media as a favourite.

On 29 November he narrowly lost the leadership vote to Brendan Nelson by three votes; Nelson quickly appointed Turnbull Shadow Treasurer. Shortly after the vote, fellow Shadow Cabinet Minister Nick Minchin publicly suggested that Turnbull's failure to consult with party colleagues before declaring his opinion to the media on issues such as an apology to the Stolen Generations was what had cost him the leadership. This led to a disagreement between the two and culminated in Minchin privately telling Turnbull that he was "too fucking sensitive." In May 2008, Turnbull led the Coalition response to the 2008 Australian federal budget, criticising the increased taxes on luxury cars and certain alcoholic drinks, citing a possible increase in inflation as a concern.

=== Leader of the Opposition (2008–2009) ===
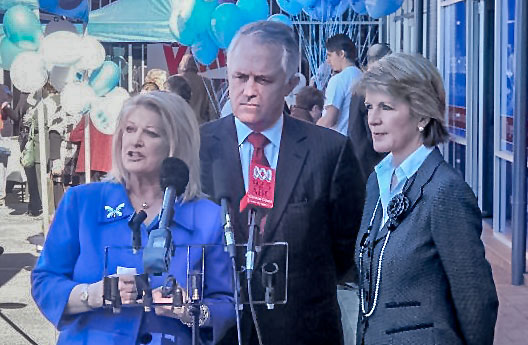
Turnbull with Deputy Leader Julie Bishop (right) and Helen Coonan (left) in July 2009

After months of consistently poor opinion polling, Turnbull challenged Brendan Nelson for the leadership on 16 September 2008. He won the ballot by four votes and became Leader of the Opposition. Later that month, Turnbull confessed that he had smoked marijuana in his younger days, becoming the first Liberal Leader to make such an admission. In early 2009, Turnbull appointed Chris Kenny, a former staffer to Alexander Downer and an Advertiser journalist, as his chief of staff. In May 2009, Turnbull attacked the 2009 Australian federal budget which came amidst the fallout from the 2008 financial crisis.

In June 2009, Godwin Grech, a Treasury civil servant, privately contacted Turnbull, alleging that a car dealer with links to the Labor Party had received preferential treatment under the OzCar program, sparking the 'OzCar affair'. Turnbull later repeated these allegations in Parliament, stating that Prime Minister Kevin Rudd and Treasurer Wayne Swan had "used their offices and taxpayers' resources to seek advantage for one of their mates and then lied about it to the Parliament" and that they needed to "either explain their actions or resign". On 22 June, the email Grech had secretly provided to Turnbull supporting allegation was alleged to have been faked by Grech. Grech subsequently admitted the forgery, with an Australian National Audit Office inquiry on 4 August clearing both Rudd and Swan of any wrongdoing. The resulting embarrassment of having repeated false allegations, as well as Turnbull's demeanour throughout the OzCar affair, was judged as the cause of a subsequent significant decline in his approval ratings in opinion polls.

On 24 November 2009, Liberal and National MPs and Senators met to discuss the Rudd government's proposed Carbon Pollution Reduction Scheme (CPRS). Turnbull announced that his policy would be to support the CPRS, despite significant disagreement among his colleagues. In response, Liberal MPs Wilson Tuckey and Dennis Jensen looked to move a leadership spill motion, intending to nominate Kevin Andrews as a challenger to Turnbull. While this attempt failed, increasing numbers of MPs and Senators publicly criticised the position, with several resigning from the Shadow Cabinet, including Tony Abbott.

On 1 December 2009, just one week after Turnbull announced the policy on the CPRS, Abbott announced he would challenge Turnbull for the leadership. Though initially regarded as having little chance of success, with Turnbull stating in public that Abbott did not have the numbers to win, Abbott defeated Turnbull in the ballot by a single vote. After the shock result, Turnbull returned to the backbench and said he would serve out the remainder of his term as Member for Wentworth. On 6 April 2010, he announced he would not seek re-election to the Australian Parliament. However, on 1 May 2010 he reversed this decision saying that he had been convinced by former prime minister John Howard to not give up his political career.

=== Shadow Minister (2010–2013) ===
At the 2010 federal election, Turnbull was re-elected with an 11.01% two-party swing towards him. After discussing the possibility of a return to the Shadow Cabinet with Tony Abbott, Turnbull was made Shadow Minister for Communications. In his first policy announcement in the role, Turnbull stated that a Coalition government would "demolish" the recently introduced National Broadband Network.

Delivering the 2012 Alfred Deakin Lecture on digital liberty, he spoke out strongly against the Gillard government's proposed two-year data retention law. In July 2012, Turnbull was criticised by some Liberal MPs for saying that civil unions should be introduced as a first step towards establishing same-sex marriage in Australia. Tony Abbott rejected Turnbull's suggestion of holding a conscience vote on the issue.

== Abbott government ==
=== Minister for Communications (2013–2015) ===
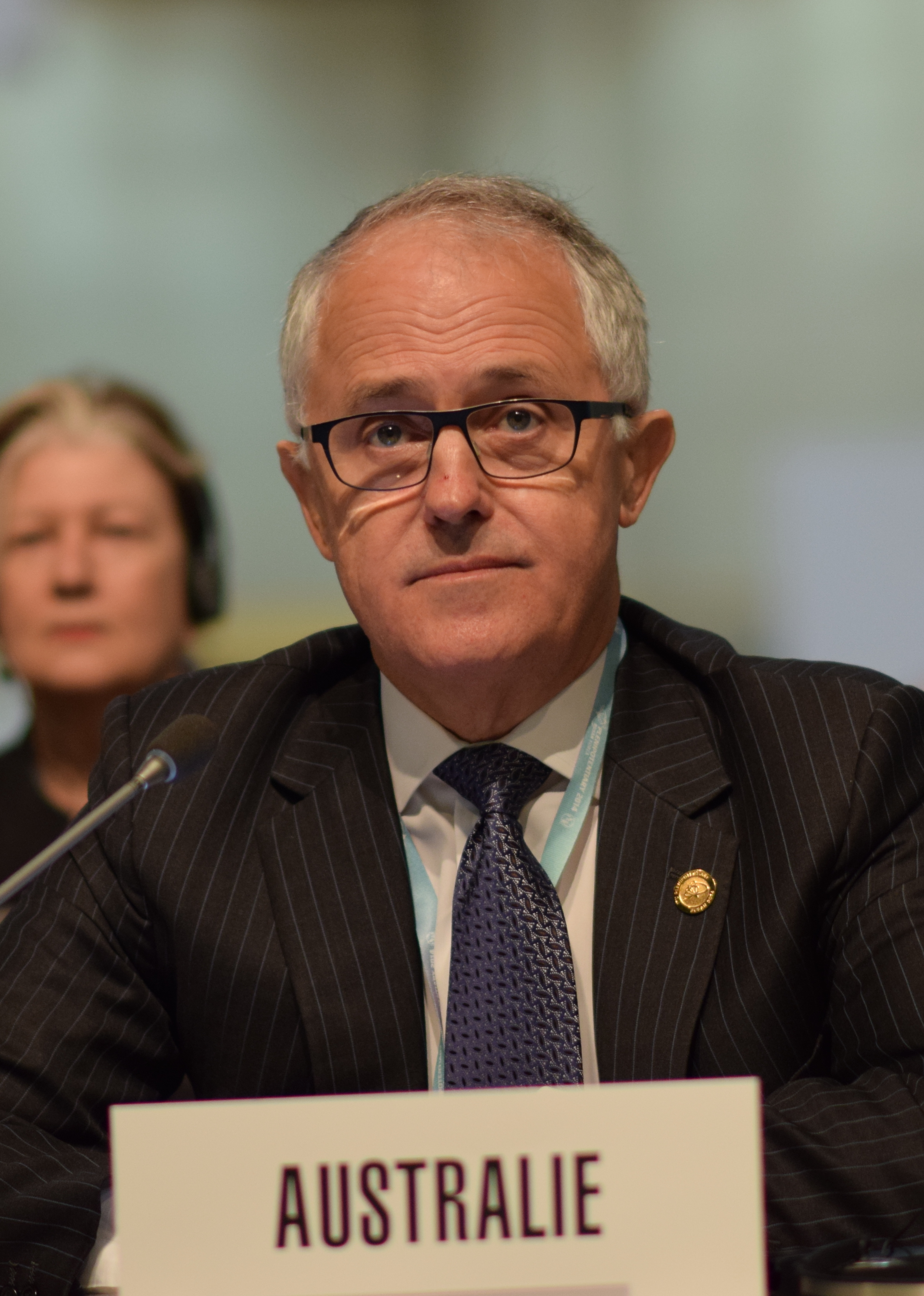
Turnbull at the 2014 International Telecommunication Union Conference in South Korea

On 9 April 2013, Turnbull and Tony Abbott presented their party's alternative National Broadband Network (NBN) plan. The plan prioritised a modified and scaled-down NBN with "fibre to the node" (FTTN) and last-mile by copper cable. The new policy contrasted with the previous position which had called for the dismantling of the entire NBN.

After the Coalition victory in the 2013 federal election, Turnbull was appointed Minister for Communications and began implementing the alternative NBN strategy. In 2014, Turnbull announced that the Vertigan Report, a cost–benefit analysis of providing fast broadband to regional and rural Australia through wireless and satellite services, revealed that continuing the plan would cost nearly A$5 billion and was expected to produce only A$600 million in economic benefits – a return of just 10%. In spite of the economic cost, Turnbull stated that whilst subsidising broadband to regional areas is "fiendishly expensive", there was no other option.

In December 2014, Turnbull brokered a deal between the Australian government, NBN Co and Telstra whereby NBN Co acquired Telstra's copper network and hybrid-fibre coaxial (HFC) to deliver the NBN. Telstra and NBN Co agreed to work together on the FTTN trial involving 200,000 premises. In August 2015, Turnbull revealed that the overall end cost of the network build would likely expand up to an additional $15 billion, with NBN Co likely to take on the additional expenditure as debt. Though still cheaper than the original Labor Party NBN policy, which aimed to deliver much faster connection speeds, the peak funding requirement under the Liberal model ran to between $46 billion and $56 billion.

=== February 2015 leadership spill motion ===
Following persistent leadership tensions amidst poor opinion polling, a leadership spill motion was moved against Tony Abbott on 9 February 2015. Although the spill motion was defeated 61 votes to 39, Turnbull had been reported as considering a run for the leadership if the spill motion had succeeded. Before the motion Turnbull had told reporters that "if, for whatever reason, the leadership of a political party is vacant then anyone, any member of the party can stand, whether they be a minister or a backbencher, without any disloyalty to the person whose leadership has been declared vacant."

== Prime Minister of Australia (2015–2018) ==
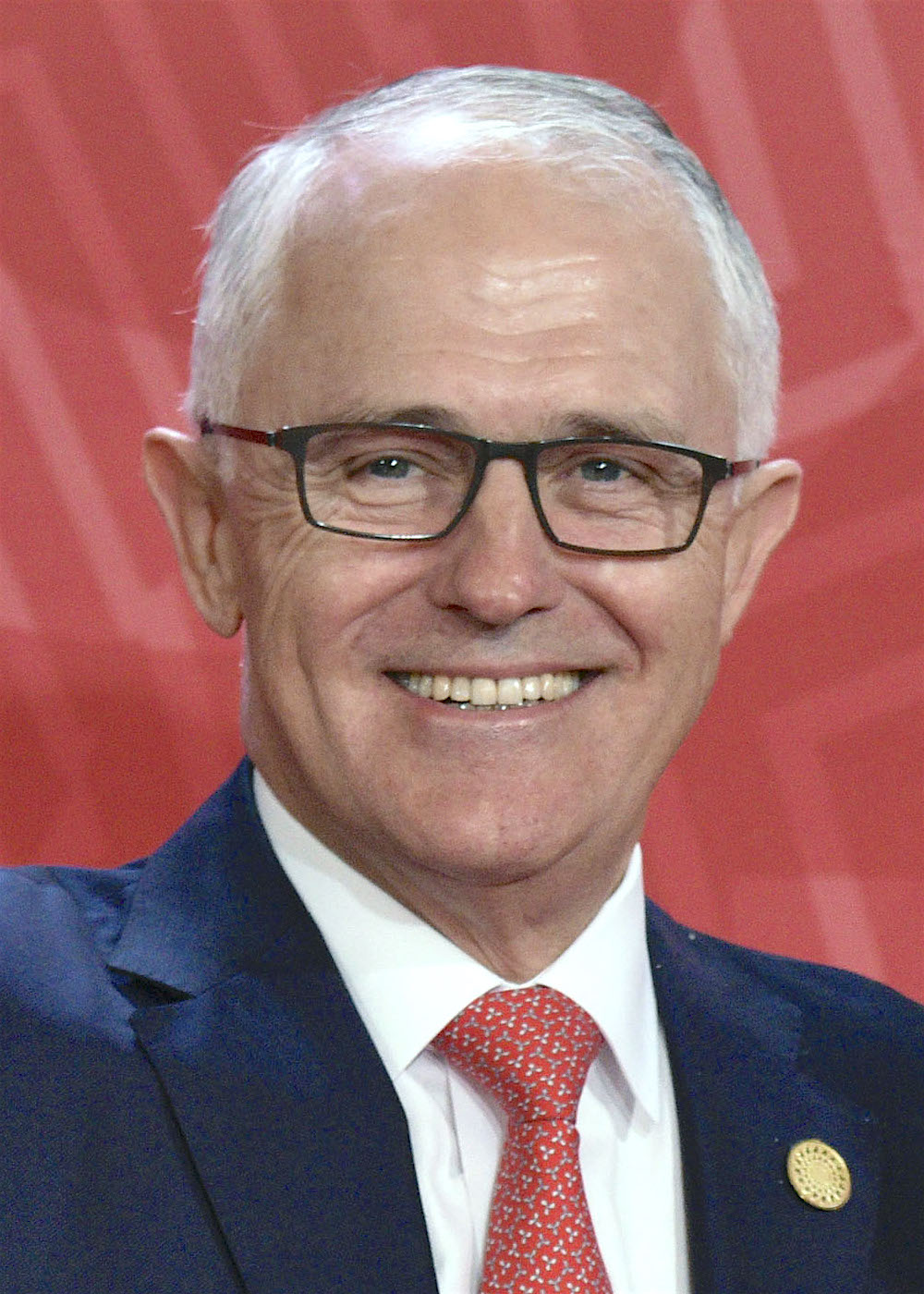
- Premiership of Malcolm Turnbull; 15 September 2015 – 24 August 2018
- Monarch: Elizabeth II
- Prime Minister: Malcolm Turnbull
- Cabinet: First Turnbull Ministry; Second Turnbull Ministry
- Party: Liberal Party
- Election: 2016
- Appointed by: Sir Peter Cosgrove
- Seat: The Lodge (Canberra); Kirribilli House (Sydney)
- Coat of arms of Australia

=== September 2015 leadership election ===
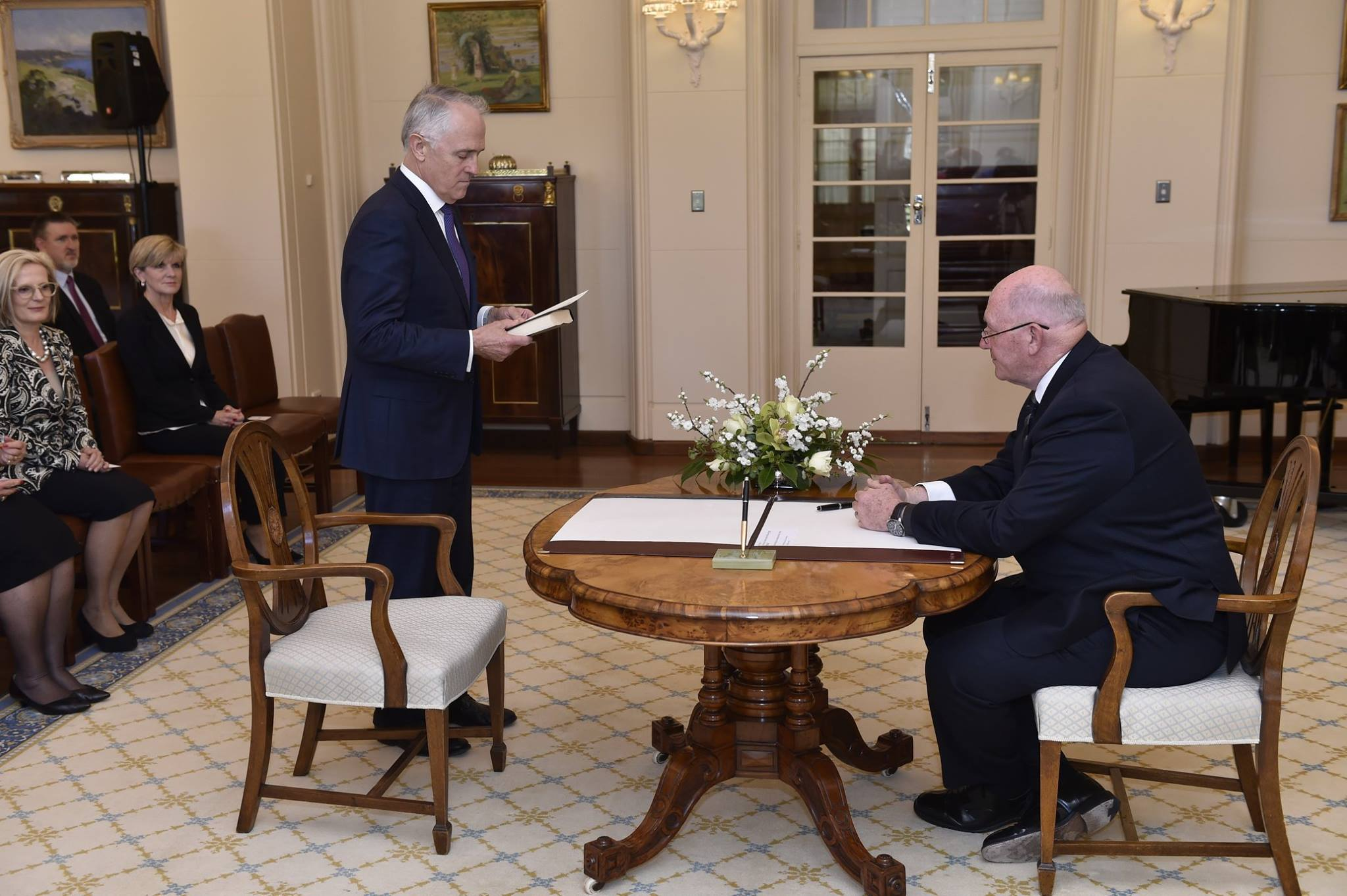
Turnbull sworn in as Prime Minister by Governor-General Sir Peter Cosgrove

Despite the defeat of the February 2015 spill motion, questions over Abbott's leadership did not abate, with the government consistently performing poorly in opinion polls. On 14 September 2015, after 30 consecutive Newspolls had put the Liberals far behind Labor, Turnbull resigned from the Cabinet and announced he would challenge Abbott for the leadership of the Liberal Party. Turnbull stated that Abbott "was not capable of providing the economic leadership we need" and that the Liberal Party needs a "style of leadership that respects the people's intelligence." Turnbull defeated Abbott by 54 votes to 44 at the subsequent leadership ballot. He was sworn in as the 29th prime minister of Australia the following day.

Turnbull announced an extensive reshuffle of the Cabinet on 20 September 2015 to form the first Turnbull ministry. Notably, he increased the number of female Cabinet ministers from two to five and appointed Marise Payne as Australia's first female Minister for Defence. The number of Cabinet ministers rose from 19 to 21. On Turnbull's key policy differences with Abbott, particularly climate change, republicanism and same-sex marriage, he stated that there would be no immediate change before any election. The Nationals successfully negotiated a total of $4 billion worth of deals from Turnbull, as well as control of the water portfolio, in exchange for a continued Coalition agreement. Turnbull stated that he would not lead a government that did not take climate change seriously.

=== 2016 federal election ===
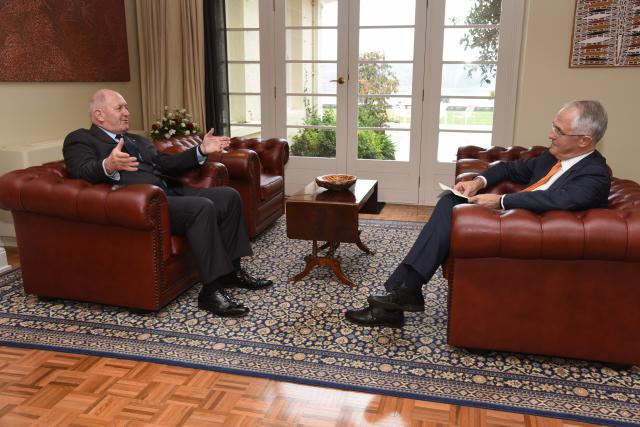
Turnbull visits Peter Cosgrove to request both Houses of Parliament be dissolved ahead of a double dissolution election.

On 21 March 2016, Turnbull announced that Parliament would consider bills to reinstate the Australian Building and Construction Commission (ABCC), with the bills having previously been rejected twice before. Turnbull stated if the Senate rejected the bills a third time, he would advise the governor-general, Sir Peter Cosgrove, to call a double dissolution of Parliament and a federal election for 2 July. Turnbull also brought forward the delivery of the federal budget from 10 to 3 May to facilitate this. On 18 April, the Senate once again rejected the bills to reinstate the ABCC. On 8 May, Turnbull visited Government House to advise Cosgrove to issue the writs for a double dissolution on 9 May; this confirmed the date of the election as 2 July 2016.

During the 2016 federal election campaign, a ReachTEL opinion poll of 626 Wentworth voters conducted on 31 May predicted a two-party swing against Turnbull for the first time since his election to Wentworth, revealing a reduced 58% two-party vote from a large 10.9% two-party swing. A controversy occurred during the election campaign, when the president of the Australian National Imams Council, Sheikh Shady Alsuleiman participated in an Iftar dinner hosted by Turnbull at Kirribilli House. Turnbull said he would not have invited Alsuleiman if he had known of his position regarding homosexuals.

At the election, the Coalition lost 14 seats and retained majority government by a single seat. The result was the closest since the 1961 federal election. In the days following the election, when the result was still not certain, Turnbull had to negotiate with the crossbench to secure confidence and supply support from Bob Katter, Andrew Wilkie and Cathy McGowan in the event of a hung parliament and resulting minority government.

In February 2017, Turnbull confirmed he had donated $1.75 million to the Liberal Party's election campaign.

=== Asylum seeker policy ===
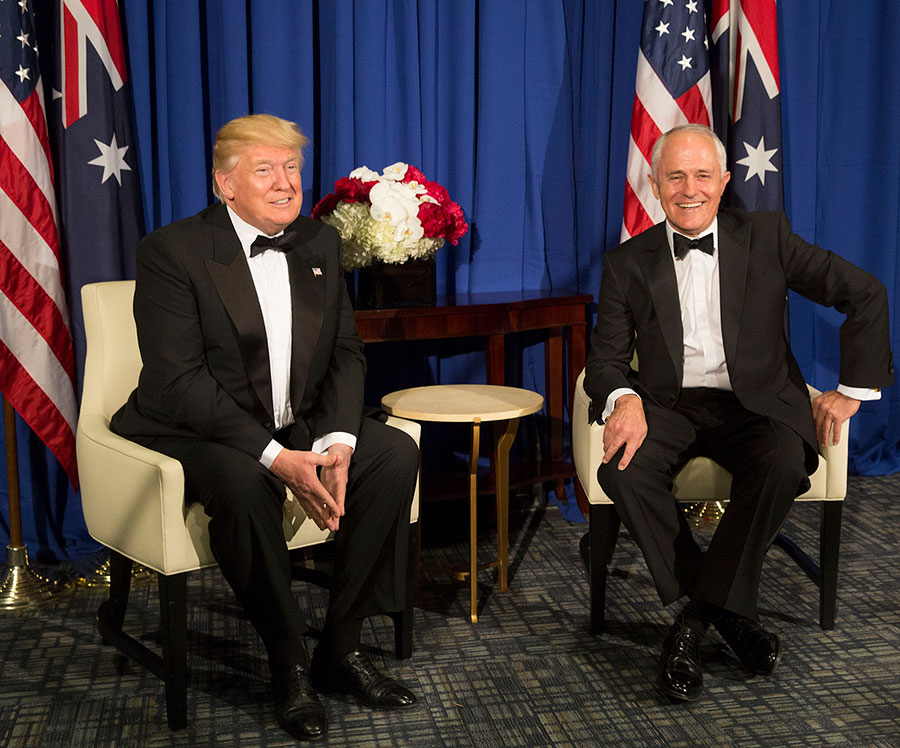
Turnbull and U.S. President Donald Trump in New York City, May 2017

Asylum seeker policy is a contentious wedge issue in Australian politics, especially since the Tampa affair. Continuing the bipartisan stance of Operation Sovereign Borders has been at the forefront the Coalition's asylum seeker policy. Around 1,250 asylum seekers remain in the offshore processing centres on Manus Island and Nauru. In August 2016, protestors called for the closure of camps on Manus and Nauru after The Guardian released leaked incident reports alleging "routine dysfunction and cruelty" on Nauru.

In July 2016, the Obama administration set up a refugee centre in Costa Rica in response to a Central American migration crisis. In November, Turnbull and Peter Dutton announced that Australia would accept 1,250 refugees from Central America, in exchange for the U.S. accepting refugees on Nauru and Manus.

Turnbull and President Donald Trump held a phone conversation on 28 January 2017, the transcript of which was later leaked to The Washington Post. On 2 February 2017, Trump tweeted that Obama's deal was "dumb". US Vice President Mike Pence later confirmed that the United States would honour the deal, subject to "extreme vetting" of asylum seekers. Australia began receiving Central American asylum seekers in July 2017.

=== Energy policy ===
Since the 2016 election, the Turnbull government had followed prior Coalition government energy policies. This involved the wholesale dismissal of renewable energy targets and emissions intensity schemes. This had only hardened when South Australia faced large blackouts, which Turnbull had blamed on the state's "ambitious" renewable energy target. In response to the gas and energy crisis that occurred in March 2017, Malcolm Turnbull announced a 50% increase in the capacity of Snowy Hydro through "pumped hydro" technology.

In April 2017, Turnbull announced that he would use the Commonwealth government's powers to place export restrictions on the nation's liquified natural gas ("LNG") industry. He announced that these changes were in response to the high wholesale gas prices that were a result of a shortage of gas in the domestic gas market, and that it was "unacceptable" that domestic prices were so high, indicating that a consequence of these restrictions would be a decrease in the wholesale gas price. The multinational gas companies and the gas industry association heavily criticised the policy, saying that it would neither increase supply nor reduce the wholesale price of gas.

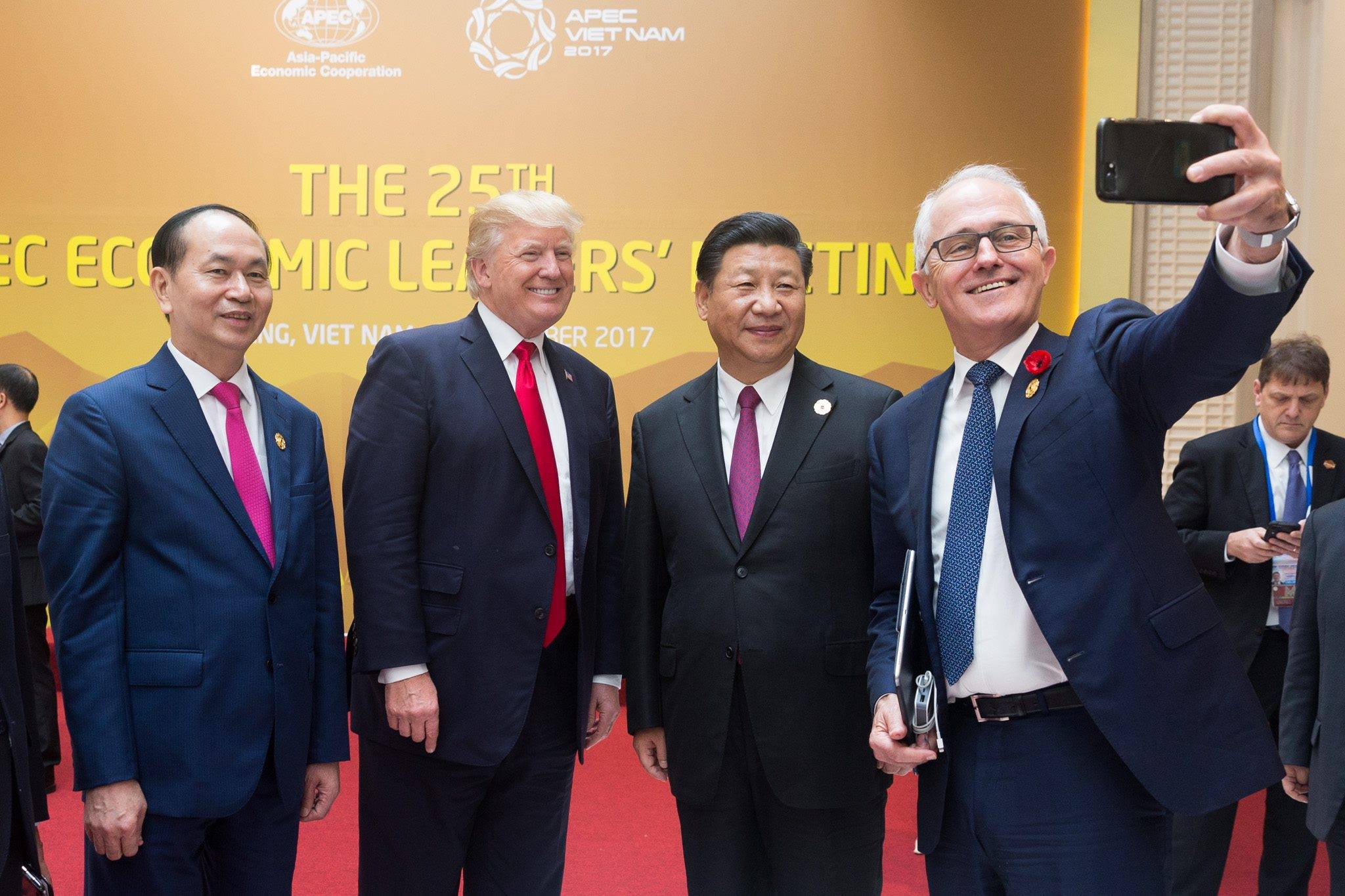
Turnbull takes a selfie with Trần Đại Quang, Donald Trump, and Xi Jinping, November 2017

=== Same-sex marriage plebiscite ===
Prior to Turnbull becoming prime minister, the parliamentary Liberal Party voted to resolve the issue of same-sex marriage by putting the question to Australian voters via a plebiscite. Enabling legislation was rejected twice by the Senate, and so the government decided to adopt a postal plebiscite option, which involved the Australian Bureau of Statistics conducting a nationwide survey asking voters whether they would like to see a change in the definition of marriage. Sending out of ballots began on 12 September 2017, as attempts to prevent the survey through a High Court challenge failed. The survey ended 7 November 2017 and results released 15 November the same year. It returned with a total of 7,817,247 (61.6%) "Yes" responses and 4,873,987 (38.4%) "No" responses.

Following the vote, after four days of debates regarding amendments which included proposals to increase religious protections to refuse services to same-sex couples, on 7 December 2017 same-sex marriage was legalised through a parliamentary vote by the House of Representatives; Turnbull himself voted "Yes". The first same-sex marriages in Australia occurred as a result of the law change from 9 January 2018.

=== Parliamentary eligibility crisis ===
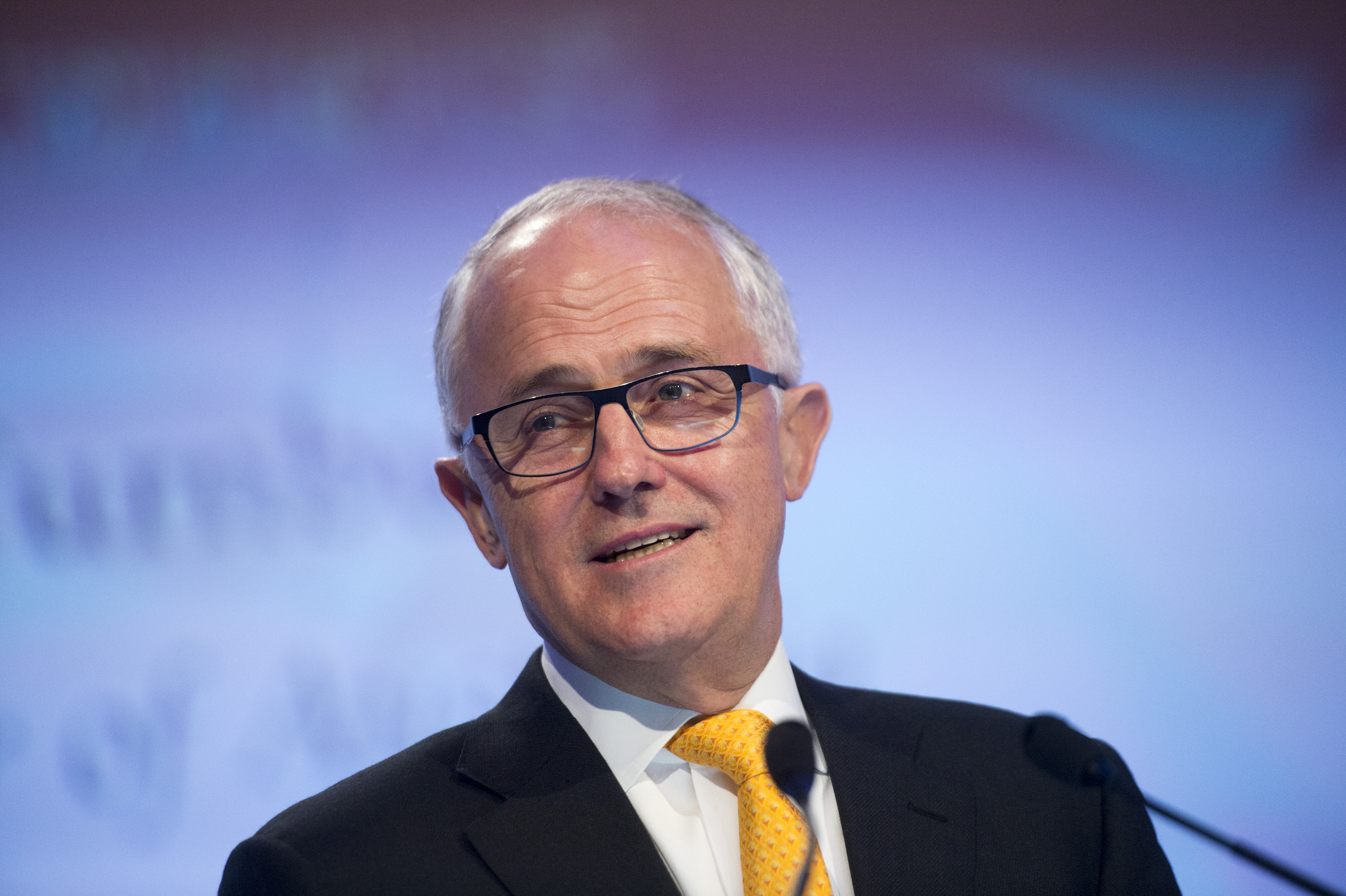
Turnbull in June 2017

Members of Turnbull's government were among those embroiled in the parliamentary eligibility crisis that arose in 2017, which disqualified several parliamentarians who held dual citizenship in accordance with subsection 44(i) of the Australian Constitution. Three Cabinet members were among the "Citizenship Seven" whose cases were heard in the High Court of Australia: the leader and deputy leader of the co-governing National Party, Deputy Prime Minister Barnaby Joyce, Senator Fiona Nash, and Resources Minister Matt Canavan, who resigned from Cabinet after discovering his potential dual citizenship. The High Court ruled that Canavan was eligible, but disqualified dual citizens Joyce and Nash from Parliament.

The Turnbull government temporarily lost its one-seat majority in the House of Representatives after Joyce's disqualification and the resignation of Liberal Party MP John Alexander, who also held dual citizenship. However, in December 2017 both Joyce and Alexander, having renounced their foreign citizenships, contested and won by-elections in their former seats of New England and Bennelong respectively, thereby retaining Turnbull's governing majority in the House of Representatives. During this time Turnbull served as Minister for Agriculture and Water Resources, the portfolio which Joyce held prior to his disqualification. Joyce returned to this role following his by-election victory.

=== August 2018 leadership spills ===
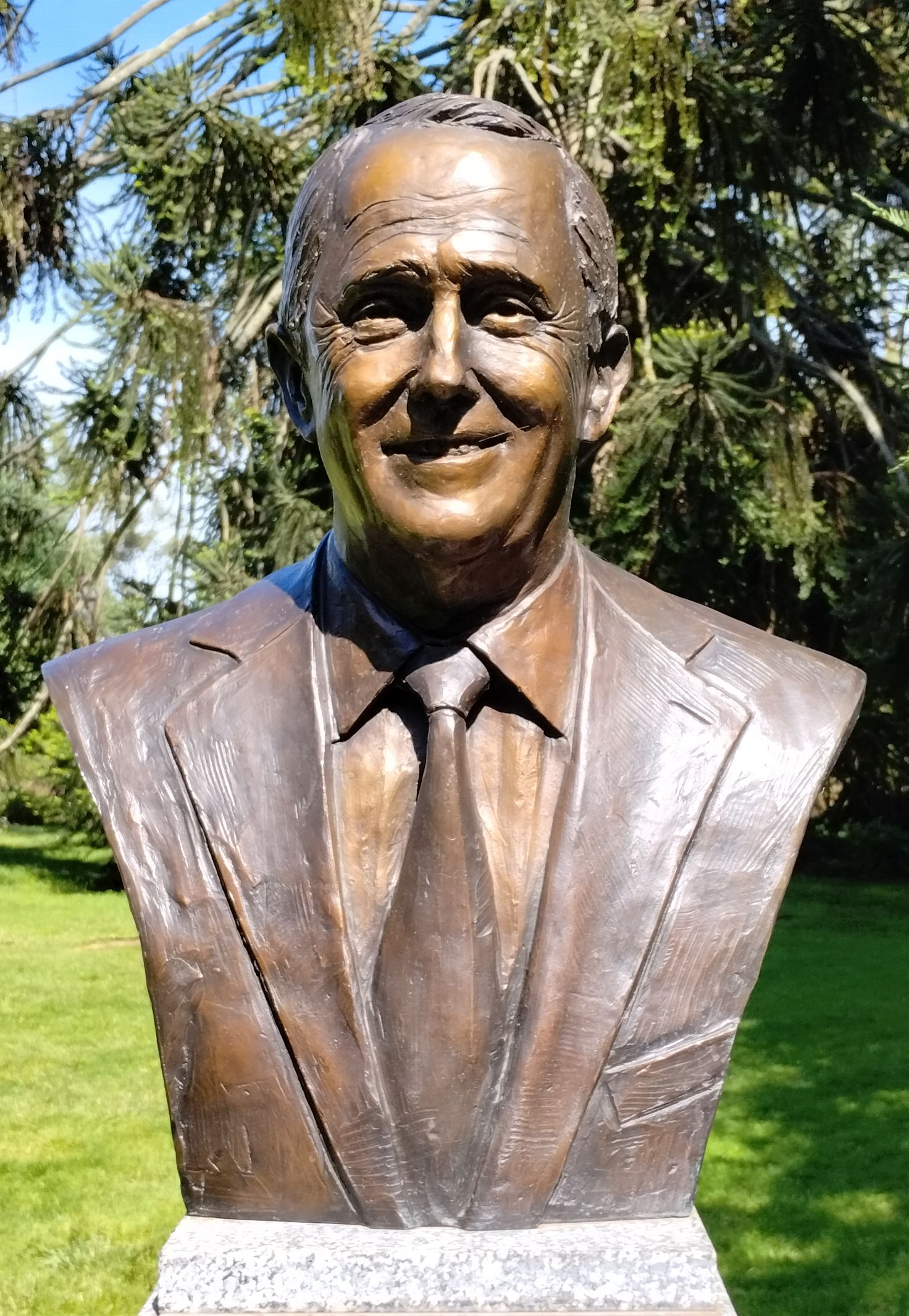
Bronze bust of Turnbull in Prime Ministers Avenue, Ballarat

On 21 August 2018, Turnbull survived a challenge to his leadership of the Liberal Party by Home Affairs Minister Peter Dutton, winning by 48 votes to 35. The spill highlighted ideological tensions within the Liberal Party, between the moderate wing led by Turnbull and the conservative wing represented by Dutton and Tony Abbott. From 21 to 23 August, tensions mounted and Dutton announced that he would seek a second spill. Turnbull responded that, pending a report from the Solicitor-General of Australia on the eligibility of Dutton to serve in Parliament and the receipt of a petition calling for a party room meeting that bore the signatures of at least half (43) of the parliamentary party, he would call such a meeting, vacate the leadership (regarding the petition as a vote of no confidence) and not stand in the subsequent leadership election. On the morning of 24 August, the Solicitor-General advised that Peter Dutton was "not ineligible" to serve. Later that morning, Dutton presented to Turnbull a document calling for a party room meeting that contained the minimum 43 signatures. A party meeting was then called and the leadership was spilled, with Scott Morrison elected as Turnbull's successor by 45 votes over Dutton with 40. In his final press conference as prime minister, Turnbull denounced Dutton and Abbott as "wreckers".

On 27 August Turnbull announced that he would resign from Parliament over the coming days. On 31 August 2018 he tendered a formal notice of resignation to the Speaker of the House of Representatives.

== Political ideology ==
Coming from the moderate faction of the Liberal Party, Turnbull has been described as being pragmatic and holding a centrist ideology, with progressive and socially liberal views. An acolyte of former Prime Ministers Alfred Deakin and Robert Menzies, Turnbull said in a 2017 speech:

"In 1944 Menzies went to great pains not to call his new political party, consolidating the centre right of Australian politics, "conservative" – but rather the Liberal Party, which he firmly anchored in the centre of Australian politics."

—

Later he added:

"The sensible centre, to use my predecessor Tony Abbott's phrase, was the place to be and it remains the place to be now."

—

Since the end of his political career, he has been highly critical of the Liberal Party's perceived shift to more overt right-wing politics.

== Life after politics ==
On 1 June 2019, Turnbull returned to the private sector as a senior advisor to major global private equity firm KKR. Turnbull returned to Australia in December 2019 and appeared on the final episode of Q&A hosted by Tony Jones on 9 December 2019.

Turnbull publicly criticised the Morrison government for not taking strong enough action on climate change, arguing that they should readopt his National Energy Guarantee (NEG) policy. In a piece in The Guardian, he stated that, "Scott Morrison can't afford to waste the bushfire crisis when Australia urgently needs its own Green New Deal...There are simply no more excuses. We cannot allow political prejudice and vested interests to hold us up any longer. If ever there was a crisis not to waste, it is this one. Morrison has the chance now to reinstate the NEG with higher targets. Both he and Josh Frydenberg were among its strongest supporters when I was PM. They abandoned it in the lead-up to an election, to pacify the right wing of the Coalition that sabotaged it in the first place."

On 25 October 2020, Turnbull gave his support to former Australian prime minister Kevin Rudd's petition for a "Royal Commission to ensure a strong, diverse Australian news media" with the goal of investigating Rupert Murdoch's control over Australian news media, tweeting that he had signed it and encouraging others to follow suit. The petition became the most signed parliamentary e-petition in Australia, with more than 500,000 signatures. The petition was tabled in the House of Representatives by Labor MP Andrew Leigh on 9 November 2020.

In January 2021, Turnbull joined the board of the International Hydropower Association as a non-executive member, also becoming a co-chair of the organisation's International Forum on Pumped Storage Hydropower. In 2025, his company sold two pumped hydro projects (Glenbawn Dam and Glennies Creek Dam) to AGL.

In 2023, Turnbull gave a speech at the Centre for Asia Pacific Resilience and Innovation, at the organisation's annual forum in Taipei, Taiwan. In the speech, he stated that Taiwan was under a greater threat from local actors who spread lies than external forces, seemingly hinting at recent issues involving China.

== Support for new centrist party ==
Turnbull has been a heavy critic of the Liberal Party's shift to the right, including criticising the party for 'copying One Nation', and in May 2026 publicly backed the creation of a proposed new centrist party of teal independents.

== Personal life ==
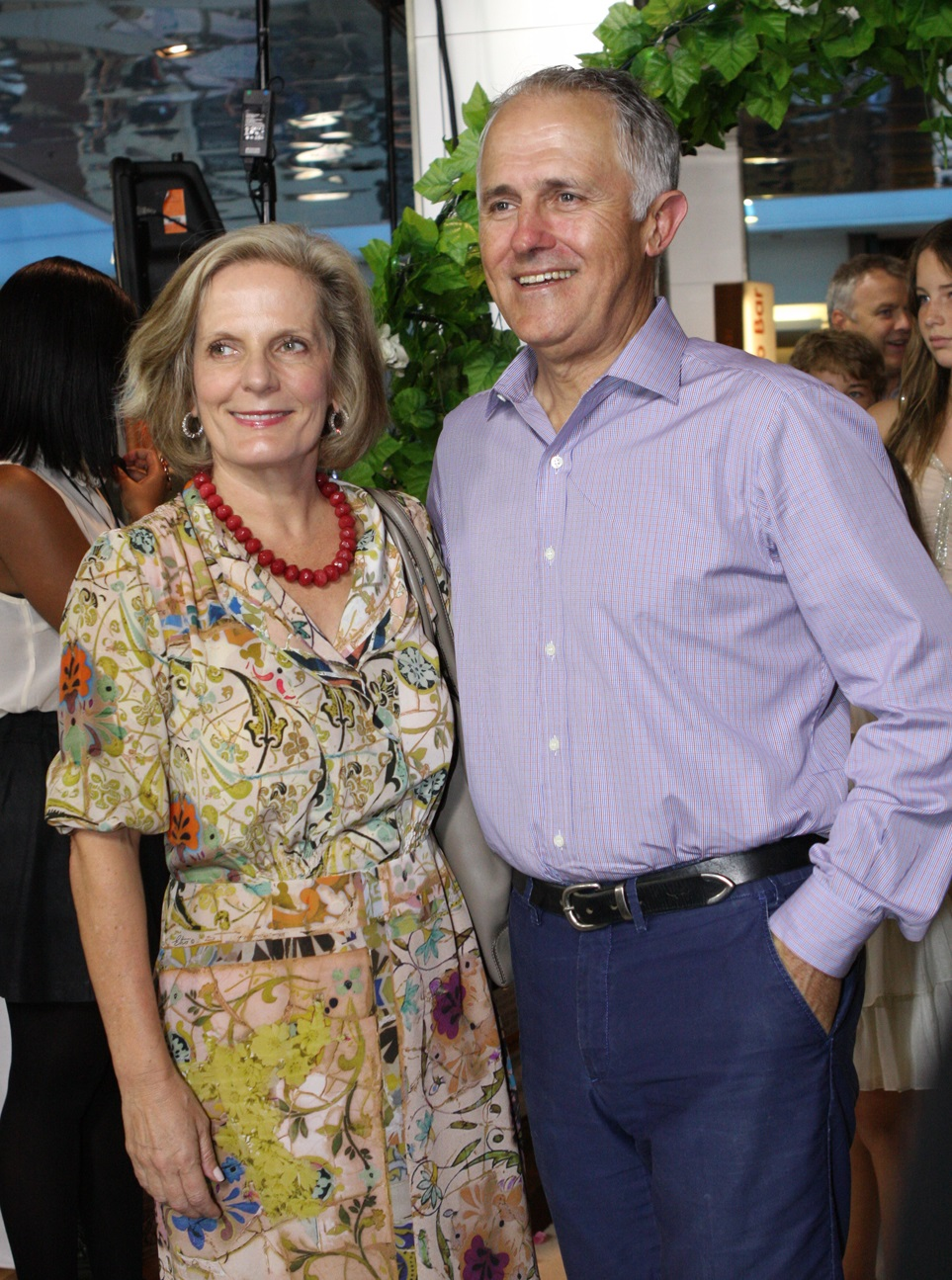
Turnbull and his wife Lucy Turnbull, 2003–04 Sydney Lord Mayor, in January 2012

Turnbull is married to Lucy Turnbull (née Hughes), who was the Lord Mayor of Sydney from 2003 to 2004 and has held a number of other prominent positions. The couple were married on 22 March 1980 at Cumnor, Oxfordshire, by a Church of England priest while Turnbull was attending the University of Oxford. They live in the eastern suburbs of Sydney.

Turnbull and Lucy have two adult children, Alex and Daisy, and as of July 2016, three grandchildren. Alex Turnbull is married to Yvonne Wang, who is of Chinese descent.

The use of Bligh as a male middle name is a tradition in the Turnbull family. It is also Turnbull's son's middle name. One of Turnbull's ancestors was colonist John Turnbull, who named his youngest son William Bligh Turnbull in honour of deposed Governor William Bligh at the time of the Rum Rebellion.

In 2008, Turnbull became the first Liberal leader to have admitted to smoking cannabis.

=== Religion ===
Raised Presbyterian, Turnbull became agnostic in the beginning of his adult life and later converted to Roman Catholicism "by mid-2002"; his wife's family is Roman Catholic. However, he has found himself at odds with the church's teaching on abortion, stem cell research and same-sex marriage. Turnbull supported legislation relaxing restrictions on abortion pill RU486, and he also voted for the legalisation of somatic cell nuclear transfer. He did so despite vocal opposition to both proposals by Cardinal George Pell, the then-Archbishop of Sydney.

=== Personal wealth ===
In 2005, the combined net worth of Malcolm and Lucy Turnbull was estimated at A$133 million, making him Australia's richest parliamentarian until the election of billionaire Clive Palmer in the 2013 election.

Turnbull made the BRW Rich 200 list for the second year running in 2010, and although he slipped from 182 to 197, his estimated net worth increased to A$186 million, and he continued to be the only sitting politician to make the list. Turnbull was not listed in the 2014 list of the BRW Rich 200. As of 2015, his estimated net worth is in excess of A$200 million.

== Honours ==
On 1 January 2001, Turnbull received the Centenary Medal for services to the corporate sector. In the 2021 Australia Day Honours, he was awarded Companion of the Order of Australia for "eminent service to the people and Parliament of Australia, particularly as Prime Minister, through significant contributions to national security, free trade, the environment and clean energy, innovation, economic reform and marriage equality, and to business and philanthropy".

== Published works ==
Turnbull has written several books:

- Turnbull, Malcolm (1988). The Spycatcher Trial. William Heinemann Australia. ISBN 978-0-85561-239-9.
- Turnbull, Malcolm (1993). The Reluctant Republic. William Heinemann Australia. ISBN 978-0-85561-372-3.
- Turnbull, Malcolm (1999). Fighting for the Republic: The Ultimate Insider's Account. Hardie Grant. ISBN 978-1-86498-107-0.
- Turnbull, Malcolm (2020). A Bigger Picture. Hardie Grant. ISBN 978-1-74379-563-7.

== See also ==
- 2016 Australian federal election
- Turnbull government
- First Turnbull ministry
- Second Turnbull ministry
- Herbert Hoover – 31st president of the United States, who worked as a mining engineer and investor in Hebei, China early in his career similar to Malcolm Turnbull

== Bibliography ==
- Manning, Paddy (2015). Born to Rule: The Unauthorised Biography of Malcolm Turnbull. Carlton, Victoria: Melbourne University Press. ISBN 9780522868807.
- Turnbull, Malcolm (2022). A Bigger Picture. Richmond, Victoria: Hardie Grant Books. ISBN 9781743797884.

Non-profit organization positions
Preceded by Thomas Keneally	Chair of the Australian Republican Movement; 1993–2000	Succeeded by Greg Barns
Parliament of Australia
Preceded by Peter King	Member for Wentworth; 2004–2018	Succeeded by Kerryn Phelps
Political offices
Preceded by Gary Nairn	Parliamentary Secretary to the Prime Minister; 2006–2007	Succeeded by Tony Smith
Preceded by Ian Campbell as Minister for the Environment and Heritage	Minister for the Environment and Water Resources; 2007	Succeeded by Peter Garrett as Minister for the Environment, Heritage and the Arts
Preceded by Wayne Swan	Shadow Treasurer of Australia; 2007–2008	Succeeded by Julie Bishop
Preceded by Brendan Nelson	Leader of the Opposition of Australia; 2008–2009	Succeeded by Tony Abbott
Preceded by Tony Smith as Shadow Minister for Broadband, Communications and the Digital Economy	Shadow Minister for Communications and Broadband; 2010–2013	Succeeded by Jason Clare as Shadow Minister for Communications
Preceded by Anthony Albanese as Minister for Broadband, Communications and the Digital Economy	Minister for Communications; 2013–2015	Succeeded by Mitch Fifield
Preceded by Tony Abbott	Prime Minister of Australia; 2015–2018	Succeeded by Scott Morrison
Preceded by Barnaby Joyce	Minister for Agriculture and Water Resources; 2017	Succeeded by Barnaby Joyce
Party political offices
Preceded by Brendan Nelson	Leader of the Liberal Party of Australia; 2008–2009	Succeeded by Tony Abbott
Preceded by Tony Abbott	Leader of the Liberal Party of Australia; 2015–2018	Succeeded by Scott Morrison
