= 2007 Liberal Party leadership election =

The 2007 Liberal Party leadership election could refer to:

- 2007 Liberal Party of Australia leadership election
- 2007 Nova Scotia Liberal Party leadership election
- 2007 Liberal Democrats leadership election
