= Vaucluse Public School =

Location
- Cambridge Avenue; Vaucluse, Sydney, New South Wales, 2030; Australia; 33°51′02.59″S 151°16′52.39″E

Information
- Type: Public, co-educational, day school
- Motto: Be Thorough
- Established: 1858
- Principal: Nicole Tainsh
- Enrolment: ~300 (K–6)
- Campus: Urban
- Colours: Navy blue and white
- Website: Vaucluse PS

Vaucluse Public School (abbreviation VPS) is a school located in Vaucluse, Sydney, New South Wales, Australia. It is a co-educational public school operated by the New South Wales Department of Education with students from Kindergarten to Year 6. The school was established in 1858.

== History ==
It was opened in 1858 and celebrated 150 years in 2008.

== Notable alumni ==
- Russell Crowe, Academy Award-winning actor
- Joshua Gans, professor and economist
- Simon Townsend, journalist and TV personality
- Malcolm Turnbull, 29th Prime Minister of Australia (2015–2018)
- Peter Weir, film director

== See also ==
- List of Government schools in New South Wales
