= 2009 Liberal Party of Australia leadership spill =

- 1 December 2009

83 caucus members of the Liberal Party 42 votes needed to win
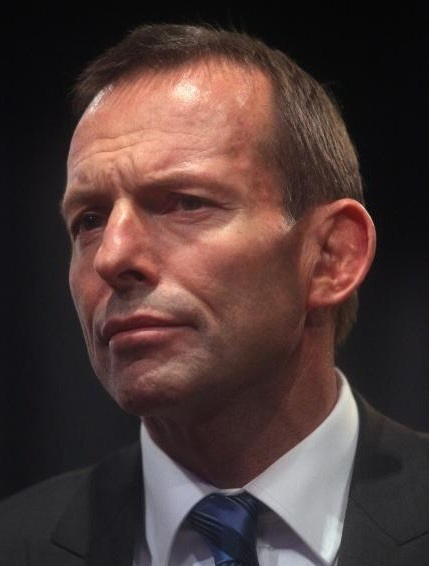

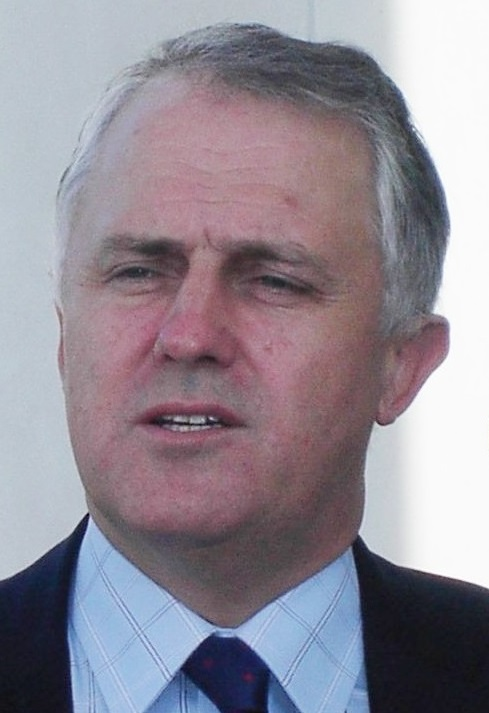

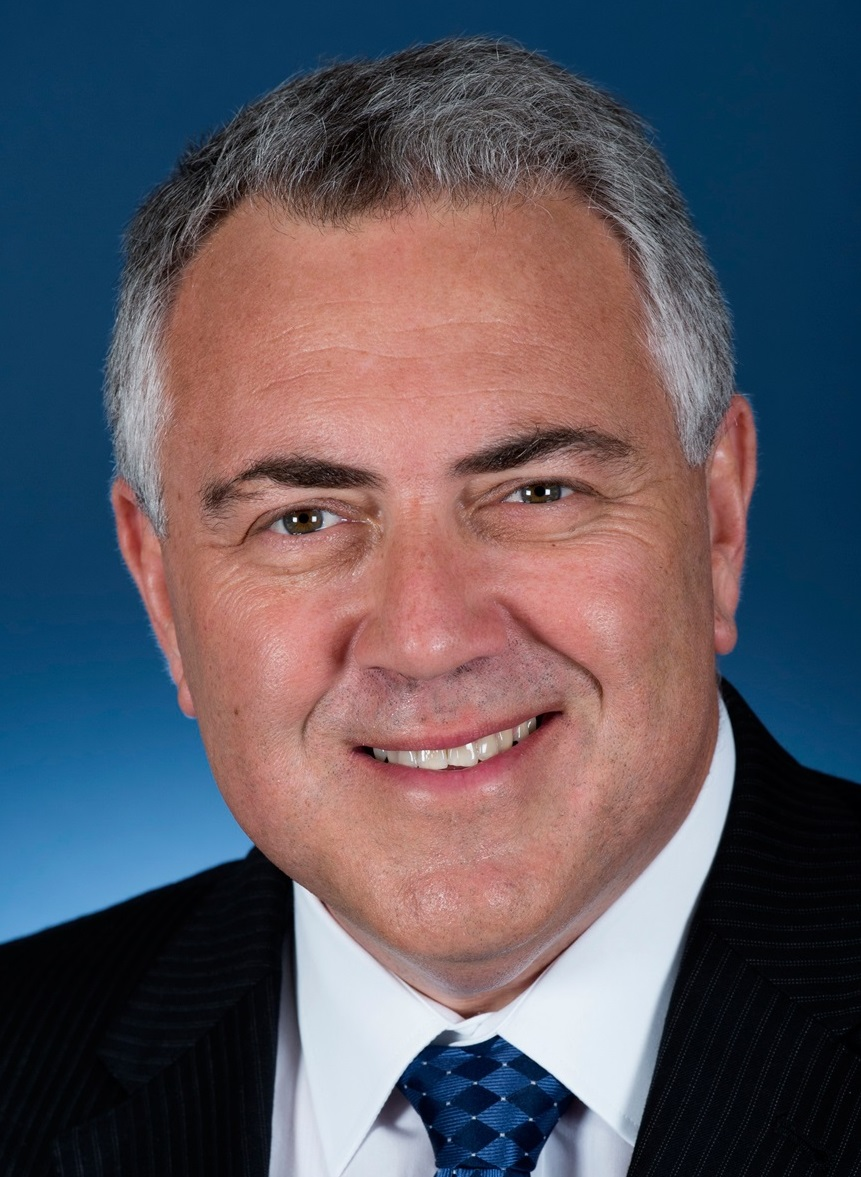
Candidate	Tony Abbott	Malcolm Turnbull	Joe Hockey
First ballot	35 (41.7%)	26 (31.0%)	23 (27.4%)
Second ballot	42 (50.6%)	41 (49.4%)	Eliminated
Seat	Warringah (NSW)	Wentworth (NSW)	North Sydney (NSW)
Faction	National Right	Moderate	Moderate
Leader before election
Malcolm Turnbull
Elected Leader
Tony Abbott

A leadership spill was held on 1 December 2009 to elect the leader of the Liberal Party of Australia. Tony Abbott was elected, defeating incumbent leader Malcolm Turnbull and Joe Hockey. Abbott thus replaced Turnbull as leader of the Opposition, and would lead the party to the 2010 federal election.

The spill was the culmination of a dispute within the Liberal Party over its response to the Rudd government's proposed emissions trading scheme (ETS). Turnbull supported the introduction of an ETS and sought to negotiate amendments to government's proposed legislation. Abbott came to represent many Liberal MPs who were climate change deniers or otherwise opposed the ETS. After Turnbull survived a spill motion (a motion to declare the leadership vacant) against his leadership in late November 2009, Abbott declared his candidacy and a subsequent spill was moved on 1 December. Hockey—a moderate who had been a supporter of Turnbull's position on the ETS—also stood. While Hockey had been expected to win, he was knocked out in the first round of voting. Abbott subsequently defeated Turnbull in the second round, 42–41. Julie Bishop, who voted for Turnbull, was re-elected unopposed as the party's deputy leader.

== Background ==
Malcolm Turnbull was elected to the House of Representatives in the 2004 federal election. In January 2007 he was appointed Minister for the Environment and Water Resources by Prime Minister John Howard. After the Australian Labor Party defeated the Howard government in the 2007 election, Turnbull, Brendan Nelson and Tony Abbott announced they would each contest the Liberal Party leadership. Nelson defeated Turnbull in a ballot after Abbott withdrew his candidacy. Turnbull became the Shadow Treasurer on Nelson's frontbench.

Nelson's leadership of the Liberal Party was beset by poor opinion poll numbers. There was speculation that Turnbull would challenge Nelson for the leadership in late 2008; however, Nelson caught Turnbull by surprise by calling a snap spill of the party's leadership positions while Turnbull was returning from an overseas holiday. The spill was moved on 16 September 2008. Turnbull defeated Nelson by four votes, becoming the leader of the Liberal Party and of the Opposition Coalition between the Liberals and the National Party. Nelson later resigned from the House of Representatives.

== Climate change policy dispute ==
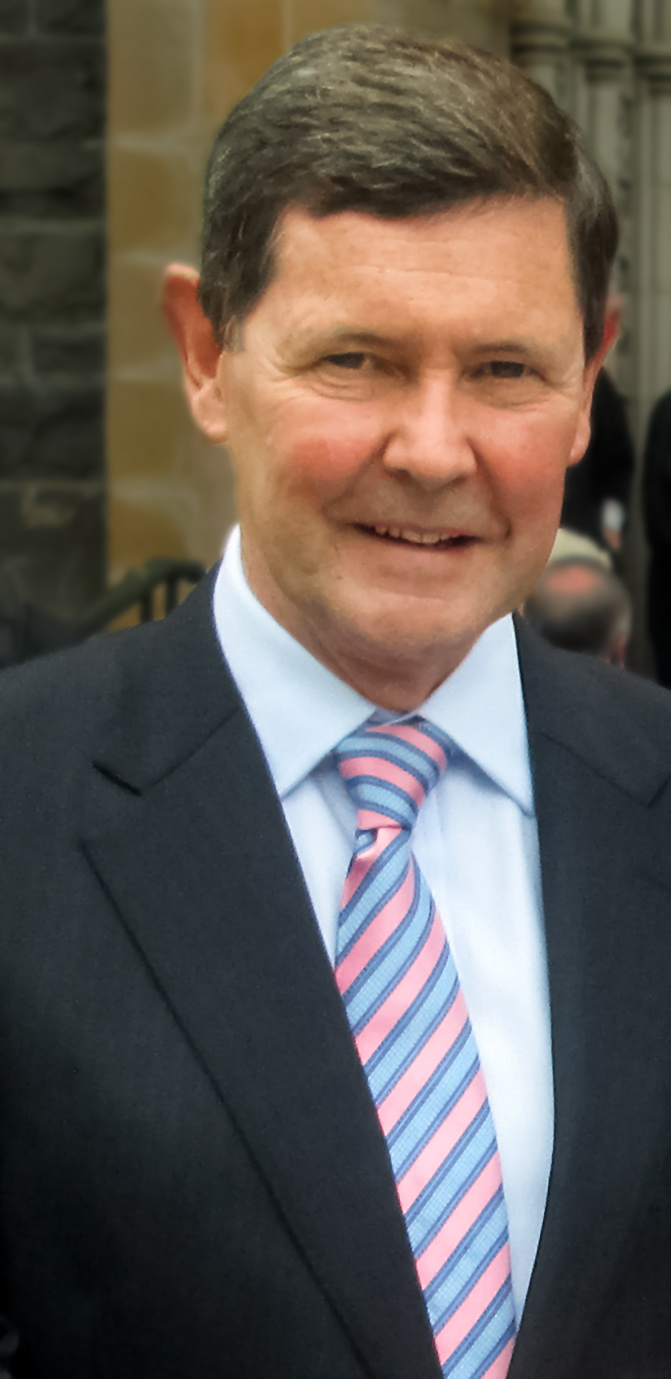
Kevin Andrews in 2014

Turnbull was regarded as a "believer" in global warming. As Environment Minister, he had overseen the introduction of an emissions trading scheme (ETS) as a policy of the Liberal Party shortly before the Howard government's defeat. However, many of Turnbull's fellow MPs in the Coalition were climate change deniers. Tensions within the Coalition on climate change policy had contributed to the downfall of Nelson's leadership.

As leader of the Liberal Party, Turnbull supported the introduction of an ETS. In June 2009, he indicated in principle support for an ETS proposed by the Rudd government despite the opposition of his Coalition partner, the National Party. Turnbull subsequently outlined the Coalition's position that it would oppose the ETS introduced to Parliament by the government, but would be open to negotiating an amended version.

Turnbull's willingness to negotiate with the government was met with opposition from some Coalition MPs. By September 2009, The Australian was reporting that only 12 of the 59 Liberal backbenchers supported negotiations. On 18 October 2009, Turnbull fronted a meeting of Coalition MPs with a proposal to negotiate amendments to the government's ETS. This meeting supported his proposal, in what was seen as a test of Turnbull's leadership. However, there was speculation that a number of Coalition Senators would defy Turnbull and cross the floor of the Senate to vote against any ETS legislation. The ETS opponents argued that it would be premature for Parliament to pass ETS legislation before the Copenhagen Summit on climate change.

The divisions within the Coalition were laid bare in an episode of Four Corners, aired by the Australian Broadcasting Corporation on 9 November 2009. The program featured the Coalition's leader in the Senate, Nick Minchin, suggesting that man-made climate change was a conspiracy of the political left and disputing Turnbull's authority to strike a deal with the government on the ETS. Later in the month, Minchin spoke against the ETS in the Senate. Abbott—who had publicly supported the ETS—was now arguing that the Coalition should abandon the policy. Turnbull attacked Abbott's change of mind, stating: "Tony has expressed a number of views, each of which is at odds with the view he expressed before".

On 23 November 2009, the Coalition's climate change spokesman Ian Macfarlane agreed to a deal with the government to amend the ETS legislation. The amendments provided industry with substantial compensation and exemptions from the ETS. Turnbull took the deal to Liberal MPs for formal approval, but a majority of backbenchers opposed it. Turnbull nonetheless claimed he had the Coalition's support, by counting as supporters the 20 members of the Coalition Shadow Cabinet who he argued should be presumed to support the deal. This claim was met with rancour by his opponents in the Coalition.

Anger at Turnbull's response to the 23 November 2009 meeting triggered a spill motion against his leadership three days later. The motion was moved by Kevin Andrews, a former Minister in the Howard government, but was defeated by a vote of 48 to 35. Andrews was not seen as a genuine prospect for the leadership, so the close vote on the spill motion was considered a blow to Turnbull. While Abbott supported Turnbull at the time of Andrews' spill, he subsequently resigned from the frontbench. Several others joined Abbott in resigning, including Nick Minchin, Eric Abetz, Sophie Mirabella and Tony Smith.

== Abbott and Hockey challenges ==
Abbott announced on 27 November—one day after Turnbull survived Kevin Andrews' spill motion—that he would challenge Turnbull for the leadership. Abbott committed to withdrawing his candidacy if Joe Hockey was to challenge. Abbott confirmed his opposition to the ETS legislation, questioning why Australia would legislate for a potentially detrimental economic measure before other countries had committed to do the same. A Newspoll released on 30 November placed Hockey at 33%, Turnbull at 30% and Abbott at 19%, when voters were asked who would be the "best person to lead" the Liberal Party. Speculation flourished that Hockey would challenge Turnbull, and Hockey consulted senior party dignitaries such as Howard and Costello about whether he should run.

Hockey faced a dilemma. A moderate in the Liberal Party, Hockey had been a consistent supporter of the ETS. Running against Turnbull would mean taking the leadership with the support of the party's right wing and climate change deniers. Turnbull seized on the dilemma, claiming Hockey had given Turnbull his "complete support" and was still a firm supporter of the ETS legislation.

Hockey attempted to resolve his dilemma by declaring that as leader he would allow a conscience vote on the ETS legislation. Abbott rejected Hockey's declaration, and reneged on his earlier indication that he would withdraw his candidacy for Hockey. Abbott stated: "It now seems pretty clear we could change the leader to Joe and these offensive bills could still go through the Parliament". On Hockey's candidacy, Turnbull claimed that Hockey had pledged his opposition to the spill motion. However, it was expected that if the spill motion succeeded, Hockey would stand for the leadership against Turnbull and Abbott. Hockey was generally expected to win the ballot and become leader. To the end, Turnbull refused to stand aside as leader, insisting he would defeat the spill motion. Hockey later alleged that Turnbull had promised he would not stand against Hockey if the spill motion was successful. Turnbull denied that he had given, and therefore broken, any such undertaking.

== Results ==
On 1 December 2009, Liberal MPs convened to consider the spill motion to vacate the leadership. The motion passed 48–34, following which Turnbull, Hockey and Abbott contested a ballot. Hockey was seen as the favourite to win the ballot, but was knocked out in the first round of voting, receiving 23 votes to Turnbull's 26 and Abbott's 35. A second round of voting ensued, in which Abbott defeated Turnbull by one vote (42–41). Fran Bailey, a supporter of Turnbull, was absent for the vote, and there was one vote of "no", which was recorded as informal.

Julie Bishop remained the deputy leader of the party, without being challenged for the position. Abbott thus became the third consecutive leader, after Nelson and Turnbull, for whom Bishop would serve as deputy. After the ballots, Bishop declared that she had voted for Turnbull, although Turnbull doubted her loyalty and Bishop resorted to proving it by retrieving her ballot papers.

=== Ballots ===
Spill motion to vacate leadership
Support	Votes
Yes	48
No	34

Leadership ballot
Candidate	First round	Second round
Tony Abbott	35	42
Malcolm Turnbull	26	41
Joe Hockey	23	Eliminated

== Aftermath ==
Abbott said he was "humbled and daunted" by his unexpected election, while Hockey expressed surprise at his defeat. Upon his election, Abbott acknowledged his propensity for making controversial public statements—which with his Catholicism and background as a trainee priest earned him the moniker of "the Mad Monk"—and apologised for all his "errors of the past". A week after the ballot, Abbott named his Shadow Cabinet. Hockey remained in the key position of Shadow Treasurer. Three Howard government veterans—Kevin Andrews, Philip Ruddock and Bronwyn Bishop—were recalled from the backbench, and outspoken National Party MP and climate change denier Barnaby Joyce was appointed to the shadow Finance portfolio. Turnbull voluntarily moved to the backbench.

Under Abbott's leadership, the Liberal Party voted against the ETS legislation in the Senate on 3 December 2009. Two Liberal Senators—Judith Troeth and Sue Boyce—crossed the floor to support the legislation. In February 2010, Abbott outlined his alternative climate change policy, which would directly fund or subsidise emission reduction measures rather than cap emissions from industry.

Speaking in the House of Representatives in February 2010, Turnbull attacked Abbott's climate change policy and praised the government's ETS legislation. He argued that Abbott's subsidy-based policy would be a "recipe for fiscal recklessness". Turnbull later announced he would leave Parliament at the end of his term, before changing his mind within weeks. He claimed that his change of mind was the result of his anger at the government's decision to delay its ETS legislation until 2013. He denied being interested in regaining the leadership of the Liberal Party, saying "I don't think there is any likelihood of that I assure you". Turnbull subsequently gave qualified support to Abbott's climate change policy, arguing that while it was inferior to an ETS in principle, it was preferable to the government's approach of delaying action until 2013. While it was the third leadership spill motion in three years, the Liberal Party did not attempt another spill motion for six years after, until the February 2015 leadership spill motion which was defeated 61 votes to 39. In September 2015, Malcolm Turnbull called for another spill, directly challenging Tony Abbott in a rematch between the two, and winning the vote 54–44 to return to the position of leader of the Liberal Party, and as a result, displaced Abbott as Prime Minister of Australia.

For Hockey it is viewed that his failure to come up with a firm position on the ETS had blown what turned out to be his only chance to become Liberal leader in 2009.

When Prime Minister Tony Abbott's leadership came under question in 2014 and 2015, Hockey now Treasurer was not speculated as a potential successor to Abbott.

== See also ==
- 2007 Liberal Party of Australia leadership election
- 2008 Liberal Party of Australia leadership spill
- 2010 Australian Labor Party leadership spill
- February 2015 Liberal Party of Australia leadership spill motion
- September 2015 Liberal Party of Australia leadership spill
