= 2008 Liberal Party of Australia leadership spill =

Australian political party leadership contest

Liberal Party of Australia Leadership spill, 2008
- 16 September 2008
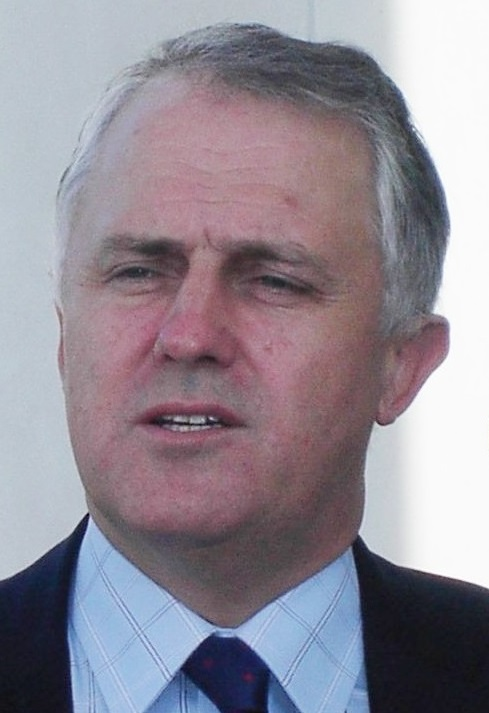

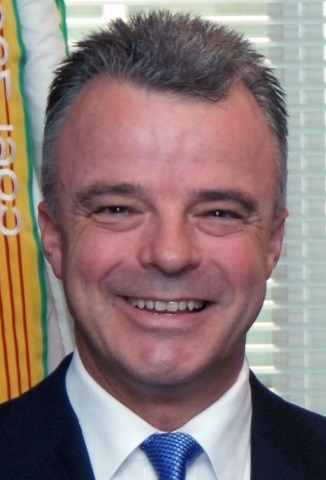
Candidate	Malcolm Turnbull	Brendan Nelson
Caucus vote	45	41
Percentage	52.3%	47.7%
Seat	Wentworth (NSW)	Bradfield (NSW)
Leader before election
Brendan Nelson
Elected Leader
Malcolm Turnbull

A spill of the leadership of the Liberal Party of Australia took place on 15 September 2008. At a ballot on 16 September, Shadow Treasurer Malcolm Turnbull defeated the incumbent leader Brendan Nelson 45 votes to 41.

== Background ==
The Liberal-National coalition led by Prime Minister John Howard was defeated at the 2007 federal election by the Australian Labor Party led by Kevin Rudd. In the aftermath, Brendan Nelson was elected leader in an ensuing ballot, in a 45–42 vote against former Minister for the Environment, Malcolm Turnbull.

Nelson's leadership came under intense pressure throughout 2008. Newspoll polling in February 2008 set a record low "Preferred Prime Minister" rating for any opposition leader at 9 percent, with March polling setting another record of 7 percent, with two party preferred setting another Newspoll record at 37-63 percent. In response to increased speculation about his leadership Nelson commented in April that he "will keep fighting and standing up for everyday Australians."

Support for Nelson as leader within the Liberal Party had all but collapsed by the end of July 2008, in part due to repeated gaffes on emissions trading and climate change. Expected to challenge him was either Peter Costello or Malcolm Turnbull, upon the release of Costello's book, The Costello Memoirs. Costello stated he would not be making any move for the Liberal leadership, but media outlets capitalised on Costello's failure to categorically rule out any future leadership challenge. Some MPs said he "still remained ready to assume the leadership later in the electoral cycle".

== Results ==
Candidate	Votes
Malcolm Turnbull	45
Brendan Nelson	41

== See also ==
- 2007 Liberal Party of Australia leadership election
- 2009 Liberal Party of Australia leadership spill
