= Jeremy Gans =

Australian author and academic

Jeremy Gans is an Australian author and academic. He is currently Professor of Law at Melbourne Law School.

His expertise is in the criminal justice system, and has particular expertise on the law of evidence, the jury system, human rights, as well as animal law.

== Early life and education ==
Jeremy completed his tertiary studies at the Australian National University, obtaining both an LLB and a BSc in theoretical physics. His interest in law was in part cultivated by constitutional law classes under Gary Rumble. He then completed a master's degree in criminology at the University of Toronto, and a PhD at University of New South Wales. His thesis focused upon the issue of standard of proof in child sexual abuse trials.

== Academic career ==
In 2016 Jeremy served as a human rights advisor for the Victorian Parliament.

In addition to his formal academic writing, he is a semi-regular contributor to the Australian culture magazine Inside Story and The Conversation.

In recent years he has been regularly quoted in Australian crime reporting drawing upon his expertise. This has included commentary regarding the trials of Chris Dawson, George Pell, and the 'Lawyer X' affair.

== Personal life ==
He is the brother of Joshua Gans, an economics professor at the University of Toronto.

== Bibliography ==
- Modern Criminal Law of Australia (Cambridge University Press, 2016)
- The Ouija Board Jurors: Mystery, Mischief and Misery in the Jury System (Waterside Press, 2017)
- Uniform Evidence (Oxford University Press, 2019)
- Guilty Pigs: The Weird and Wonderful History of Animal Law (Black Ink Books, 2022)
