= Joshua Gans =

Australian economist (born 1968)

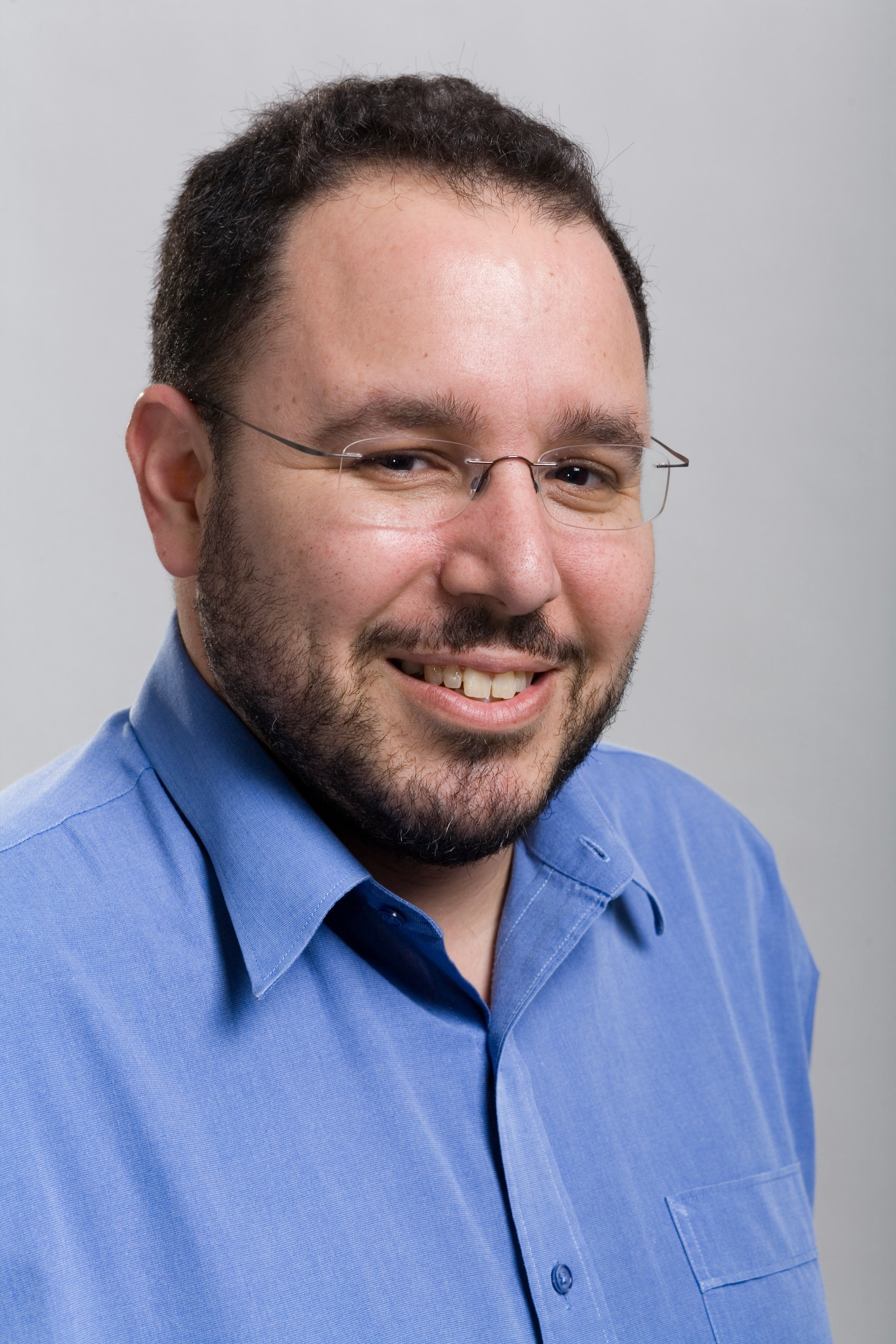
- Born: 1968 (age 57–58); Sydney, Australia
- Education: University of Queensland
- Known for: Applied Game Theory
- Awards: Young Economist Award
- Scientific career
- Fields: Economist
- Workplaces: University of Toronto; University of Melbourne; University of New South Wales
- Doctoral advisor: Paul Milgrom, Kenneth Arrow

Joshua Gans holds the Jeffrey Skoll Chair in Technical Innovation and Entrepreneurship at the Rotman School of Management, University of Toronto. Until 2011, he was an economics professor at Melbourne Business School in Australia. His research focuses on competition policy and intellectual property protection. He is the author of several textbooks and policy books, as well as numerous articles in economics journals. He operates two blogs: one on economic policy, and another on economics and parenting.

Born in 1968, he spent the first 11 years of his life in Sydney (attending Vaucluse Public School before moving to Brisbane in 1979. He attended the private boys Brisbane Grammar School before receiving a Bachelor of Economics (Honours) and the University Medal from the University of Queensland, and later attended Stanford University for his PhD in economics. His supervisors were Paul Milgrom, Kenneth J. Arrow and Avner Greif. He graduated from Stanford in 1995; having already returned to Australia to take up a lectureship in the School of Economics, University of New South Wales. He moved to Melbourne Business School in 1996 as an associate professor and became a full professor in 2000.

In 2007, Gans received the inaugural young economist award from the Economic Society of Australia. This is an award given every two years to the best economist working in Australia who is aged under 40.

Presently, Gans teaches at Rotman School of Management at the University of Toronto in Canada. He is chief economist of the Creative Destruction Lab, and department editor (business strategy) at Management Science. He is also an affiliated faculty member of the Schwartz Reisman Institute.

== Books ==
- The Pandemic Information Solution: Overcoming the Brutal Economics of Covid-19, Endeavor Literary Press, 2021.
- The Pandemic Information Gap: The Brutal Economics of COVID-19, MIT Press, 2020.
- Economics in the Age of COVID-19, MIT Press First Reads, 2020.
- Innovation + Equality: How to create a future that is more Star Trek than Terminator, (with Andrew Leigh) MIT Press, 2019.
- Prediction Machines: The Simple Economics of Artificial Intelligence, (with Ajay Agrawal and Avi Goldfarb) Harvard Business Review Press, 2018.
- Scholarly Publishing and its Discontents, Core Research Press, 2017.
- The Disruption Dilemma, MIT Press, 2016.
- Information Wants to be Shared, Harvard Business Review Press, 2012.
- Parentonomics, MIT Press: Cambridge, 2009.
- Core Economics for Managers, Thomson Learning: Melbourne, 2005.
- Finishing the Job: Real World Policy Solutions in Housing, Health, Education and Transport (with Stephen King), Melbourne University Publishing: Melbourne, 2004.
- Principles of Economics (with Stephen King, Robin Stonecash and N. Gregory Mankiw), 3rd Pacific Rim Edition, Thomson, 2005 (2nd Pacific Rim Edition, Thomson, 2003, 1st Australasian Edition, Harcourt, Sydney, 2000).
- Publishing Economics: Analyses of the Academic Journal Market in Economics (edited volume), Edward Elgar, Cheltnam, 2000.
- Principles of Macroeconomics (with Robin Stonecash, Stephen King and N. Gregory Mankiw), 3rd Pacific Rim Edition, Thomson, 2005 (2nd Pacific Rim Edition, Thomson, 2003, 1st Australasian Edition, Harcourt-Brace, Sydney, 1999).
- Principles of Microeconomics (with Stephen King and N. Gregory Mankiw), 23rd Pacific Rim Edition, Thomson, 2005 (2nd Pacific Rim Edition, Thomson, 2003, 1st Australasian Edition, Harcourt-Brace, Sydney, 1999)

== Personal life ==
Joshua is the brother of Jeremy Gans, a criminal law professor at the University of Melbourne.
