= Glennies Creek Dam =

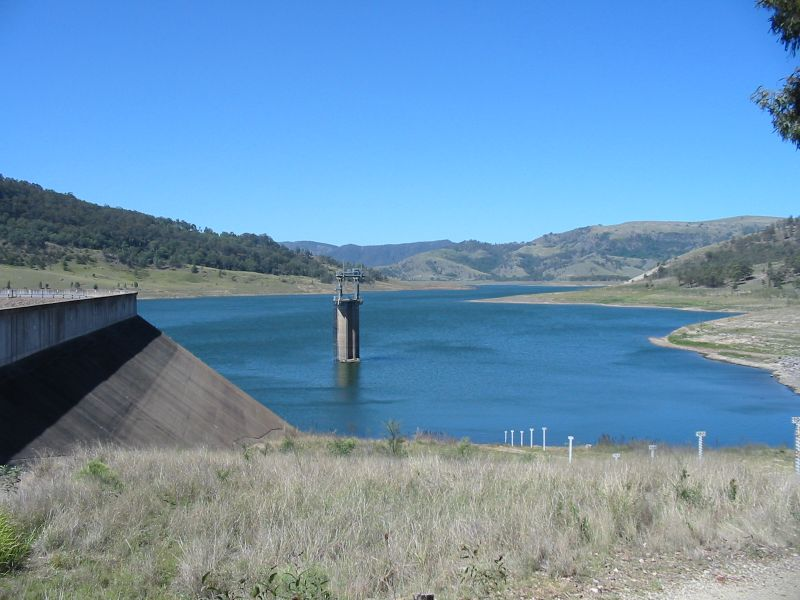
- Glennies Creek Dam and Lake St Clair, 2006.

- Location of the dam in New South Wales
- Country: Australia
- Location: New South Wales
- Coordinates: 32°20′54″S 151°15′04″E
- Purpose: Flood mitigation, irrigation, water supply and conservation
- Status: Operational
- Construction began: August 1980
- Opening date: June 1983
- Construction cost: A£30 million

Dam and spillways
- Type of dam: Rock-fill dam
- Impounds: Glennies Creek
- Height: 67 m (220 ft)
- Length: 535 m (1,755 ft)
- Dam volume: 875×10^{3} m^{3} (30.9×10^{6} cu ft)
- Spillways: 1
- Spillway type: Uncontrolled rock cut
- Spillway capacity: 637 m^{3}/s (22,500 cu ft/s)

Reservoir
- Creates: Lake Saint Clair
- Total capacity: 283,000 ML (229,000 acre⋅ft)
- Catchment area: 233 km^{2} (90 sq mi)
- Surface area: 1,540 ha (3,800 acres)
- Maximum length: 16 km (9.9 mi)
- Maximum water depth: 56 m (184 ft)
- Normal elevation: 186 m (610 ft) AHD
- Website waternsw.com.au

The Glennies Creek Dam is a minor embankment dam dam across Glennies Creek, upstream of Singleton, in the Hunter region of New South Wales, Australia. The dam's purpose includes flood mitigation, irrigation, water supply and conservation. The impounded reservoir is called Lake Saint Clair.

The Glennies Creek Dam was created through enabling legislation enacted through the passage of the Glennies Creek Dam, 1979 (NSW). The Act appropriated AU$30 million as the estimated cost of construction of the dam.

== Location and features ==
Commenced in August 1980 and completed in June 1983, the concrete-faced rock-filled Glennies Creek Dam is a minor dam on Glennies Creek, a tributary of the Hunter River, located approximately 25 kilometres (16 mi) north of Singleton and 39 kilometres (24 mi) upstream of the confluence of Glennies Creek with the Hunter River. The dam was built by Citra Constructions Limited on behalf of the NSW Department of Land and Water Conservation and the NSW Department of Water Resources to supply water for the town of Singleton, as well as irrigation, flood mitigation, and for coal mining.

The dam wall is 67 metres (220 ft) high and the arch crest is 535 metres (1,755 ft) long. The maximum water depth is 56 metres (184 ft) and when full, the resultant reservoir has capacity of 283,000 megalitres (229,000 acre⋅ft) at 186 metres (610 ft) AHD. The surface area of Lake Saint Clair is 1,540 hectares (3,800 acres) and the catchment area is 233 square kilometres (90 sq mi). The uncontrolled rock-cut spillway is capable of discharging 637 cubic metres per second (22,500 cu ft/s). A 60-metre-high (200 ft) control tower with variable level inlets allows for the control of the quality and temperature of water released from the dam. The Glennies Creek Dam is operated in conjunction with Glenbawn Dam. The two dams supply water requirements along 40 kilometres (25 mi) of the Hunter River from Glenbawn to the tidal reaches near Maitland.

The dam spillway is an unlined cutting in welded ash flow tuff which supplied the entire rock-fill requirement for the construction of the dam embankment. The spillway excavation was designed to be located entirely in welded tuff and not to encroach on either the underlying non-welded tuff or the overlying sandstone, both of these rock types being much inferior to the welded tuff as a rock fill construction material.

The Glennies Creek and the Glennies Creek Dam are both named after James Glennie, a former naval captain who was granted creek frontage land near the Hunter River junction in 1824.

== Recreation ==
The dam is a popular location for swimming, boating, sailing, water skiing and fishing.

== See also ==
- Irrigation in Australia
- List of dams and reservoirs in Australia
