= Glenbawn Dam =

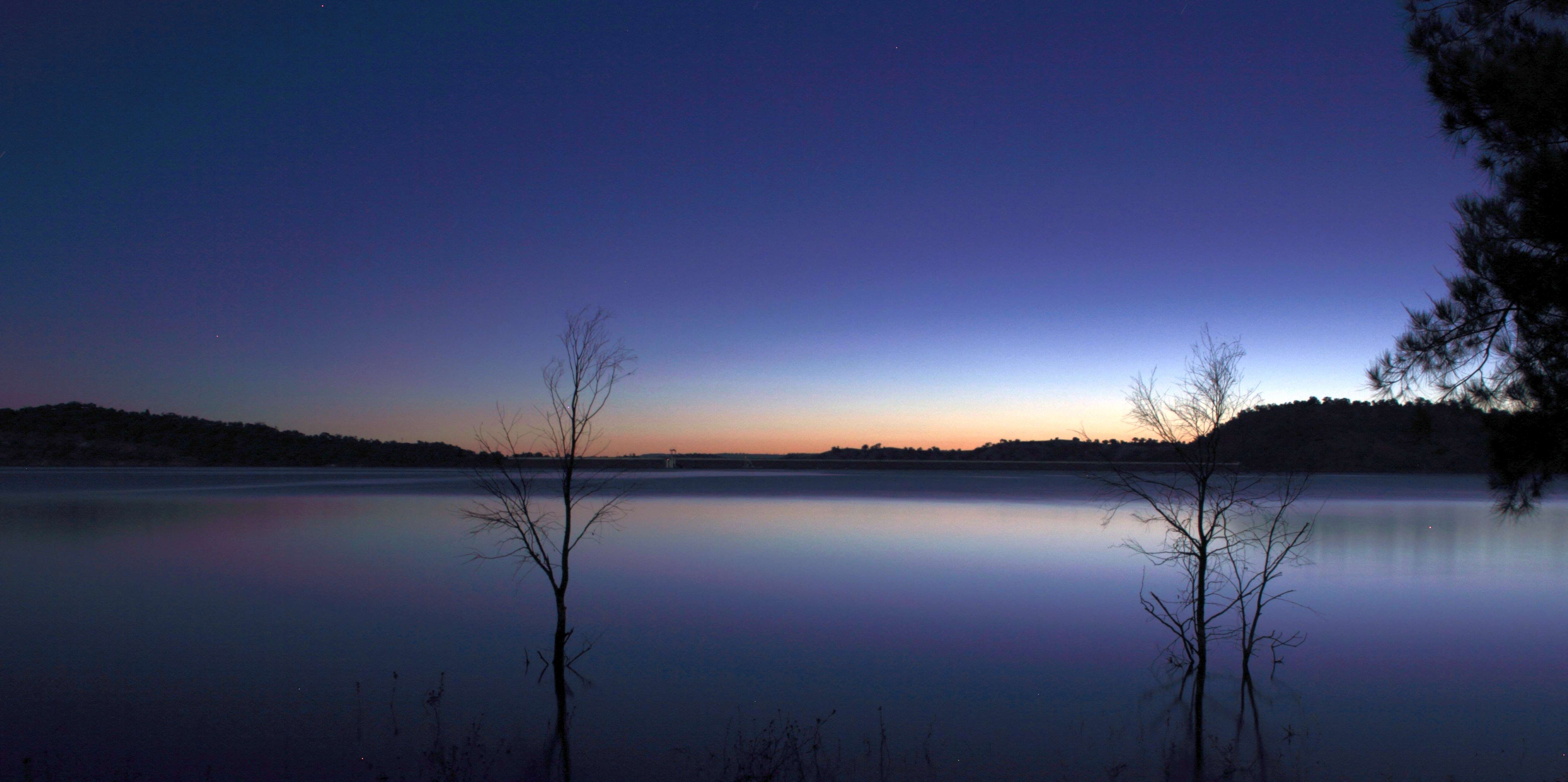
- View over Glenbawn Lake, looking south towards Glenbawn Dam embankment wall, 2013

- Location of the Glenbawn Dam in New South Wales
- Country: Australia
- Location: Hunter Valley, New South Wales
- Coordinates: 32°5′54″S 150°59′4″E
- Purpose: Environmental, hydro-electric power, irrigation, water supply and conservation
- Status: Operational
- Construction began: 1948
- Opening date: 1958
- Construction cost: A£1,500,000
- Owner: WaterNSW

Dam and spillways
- Type of dam: Embankment dam
- Impounds: Hunter River
- Height: 100 m (330 ft)
- Length: 1,125 m (3,691 ft)
- Spillways: 2
- Spillway type: Concrete chute spillway plus fuse plugs
- Spillway capacity: 11,115 m^{3}/s (392,500 cu ft/s)

Reservoir
- Creates: Lake Glenbawn
- Total capacity: 749,840 ML (26,480×10^{6} cu ft)
- Catchment area: 1,300 km^{2} (500 sq mi)
- Surface area: 2,614 ha (6,460 acres)
- Maximum water depth: 85 m (279 ft)
- Normal elevation: 276 m (906 ft) AHD

Power Station
- Operator: AGL Energy
- Commission date: January 1995
- Type: Conventional
- Turbines: 1
- Installed capacity: 5.5 MW (7,400 hp)
- Annual generation: 4.4 GWh (16 TJ)
- Website; Glenbawn Dam at www.waternsw.com.au

Glenbawn Dam is a major ungated earth and rock fill with clay core embankment dam with concrete chute spillway plus fuse plugs across the Hunter River upstream of Aberdeen in the Hunter Valley of New South Wales, Australia. The dam's purpose includes flood mitigation, hydro-electric power, irrigation, water supply and conservation. The impounded reservoir is called Lake Glenbawn.

Glenbawn Dam was created through enabling legislation enacted through the passage of the Glenbawn Dam Act, 1946 (NSW). The Act appropriated A£1,500,000 as the estimated cost of construction of the dam.

== Location and features ==
Commenced in late 1947 and completed in late 1957, the Glenbawn Dam is a major dam on the Hunter River and is the fourth largest earth-filled embankment dam in Australia by volume. The dam is located approximately 14 kilometres (8.7 mi) east of the town of Scone on the upper reaches of the river. The dam was built by the New South Wales Water Conservation & Irrigation Commission to supply water for irrigation and flood mitigation.

The dam wall height is 100 metres (330 ft) and is 1,125 metres (3,691 ft) long. The maximum water depth is 85 metres (279 ft) and at 100% capacity the dam wall holds back 749,840 megalitres (26,480×10^{6} cu ft) of water at 276 metres (906 ft) AHD. The dam has an additional reserve capacity of 120,000 megalitres (4,200×10^{6} cu ft) to hold floodwaters that reduce flooding downstream. The surface area of Lake Glenbawn is 2,614 hectares (6,460 acres) and the catchment area is 1,300 square kilometres (500 sq mi). The ungated concrete chute spillway is capable of discharging 11,115 cubic metres per second (392,500 cu ft/s). An upgrade of facilities completed in 1987 took the height of the dam wall from 78 metres (256 ft) to its current height. Glenbawn Dam is operated in conjunction with Glennies Creek Dam, and they may be upgraded to pumped-storage hydroelectricity. The two dams supply water requirements along 40 kilometres (25 mi) of the Hunter River from Glenbawn to the tidal reaches near Maitland.

The name Glenbawn originates after a riverside property resumed for part of the storage area.

=== Power generation ===
A hydro-electric power station generates up to 5.5 megawatts (7,400 hp) of electricity from the flow of the water leaving Glenbawn Dam with an average output of 4.4 gigawatt-hours (16 TJ) per annum. The station was completed in January 1995. The facility is managed by AGL Energy.

== Recreation ==
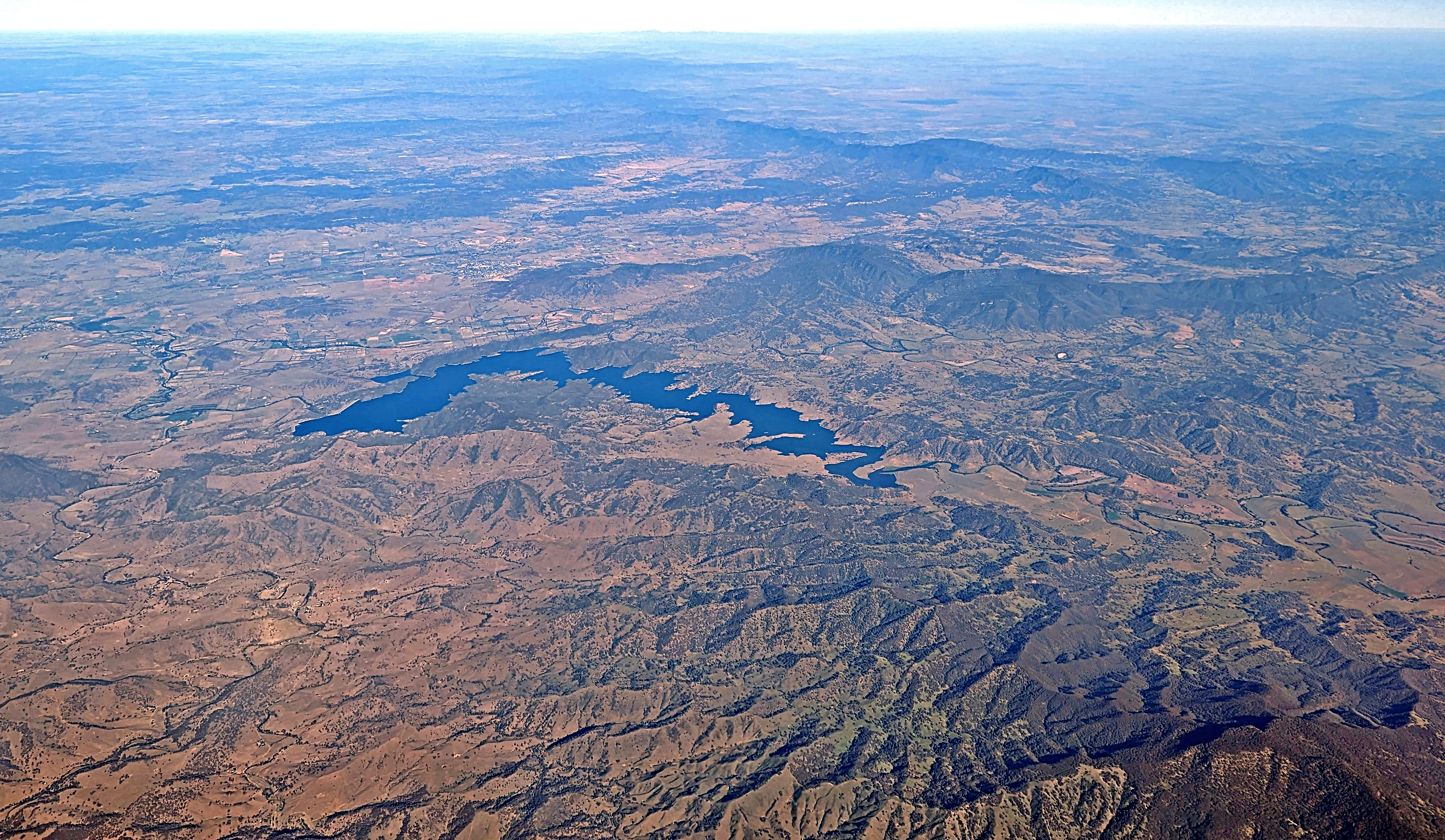
Aerial view of Lake Glenbawn from the east

The dam is a popular location for water skiing and fishing, both by boat and from shore. Located adjacent to the dam and the lake is a nature reserve; Lake Glenbawn State Park.
