= 2007 Liberal Party of Australia leadership election =

Liberal Party of Australia leadership election 2007
- 29 November 2007
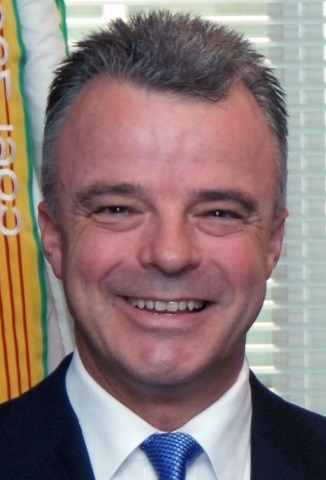

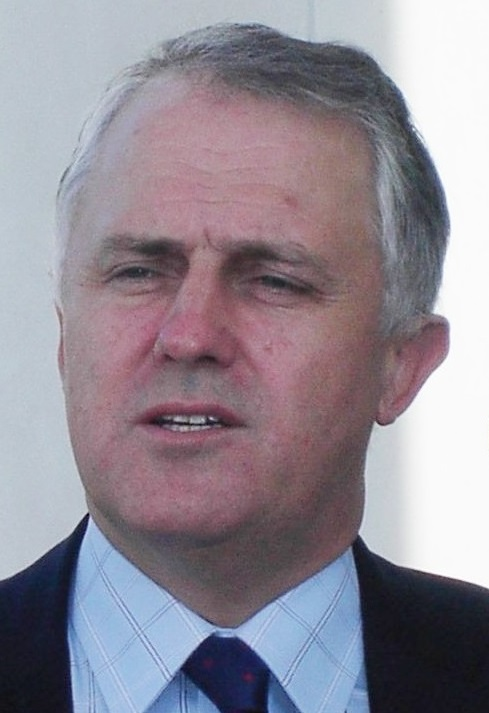
| Candidate | Brendan Nelson | Malcolm Turnbull |
| Caucus vote | 45 | 42 |
| Percentage | 51.7% | 48.3% |
| Seat | Bradfield (NSW) | Wentworth (NSW) |
Leader before election
John Howard
Elected Leader
Brendan Nelson

A spill of the leadership of the Liberal Party of Australia took place on 29 November 2007, following the defeat of the Howard government at the federal election five days earlier. The resulting ballot was an open race as outgoing prime minister John Howard had lost his own seat at the election, and his preferred successor Peter Costello refused to stand.

An election for the deputy leadership of the party was held, as under Liberal Party rules, all leadership positions are declared vacant after a general election, no matter what the outcome.

== Background ==
John Howard announced his resignation on election night after the coalition's defeat in the 2007 federal election, including the loss of his own seat of Bennelong. He had led the party since 1995 and been prime minister since the 1996 election.

The deputy leader and outgoing Treasurer Peter Costello had for a long time been publicly heralded as the natural successor to John Howard, and was confirmed as such by Howard on 12 September. However, on 25 November, Costello announced he would not be a candidate for either leader or deputy leader of the party in opposition, saying that it was time for the party to move to the next generation, and that he himself intended to leave Parliament during the current term.

== Election rules ==
Peter Costello announced on 27 November that the leadership and deputy leadership would be decided at a meeting held at midday on 29 November. All Liberal MPs and Senators were invited to attend, including those whose seats had yet to be decided, with the federal director deciding who would be eligible to vote based on the most up-to-date election results. Due to this, questions within the party were raised over the rules and legitimacy of the ballot. The loss of John Howard in Bennelong meant that the election of a new leader had to be held much closer to the election than would normally occur.

== Candidates ==
Outgoing Defence Minister Brendan Nelson and outgoing Minister for the Environment and Water Resources Malcolm Turnbull indicated they would run for the party leadership. Outgoing Minister for Health and Ageing Tony Abbott also initially indicated his intention to stand for leader, but on 28 November, one day before the leadership election, he announced that he would no longer be a candidate; he said that he had not found enough support among the remaining Liberal MPs.

Prominent outgoing ministers such as former leader Alexander Downer and Joe Hockey ruled themselves out of the election.

Outgoing Minister for Education, Science and Training Julie Bishop, Minister for Ageing Christopher Pyne and Minister for Vocational and Further Education Andrew Robb indicated they would run for the deputy leadership.

== Campaign ==
Malcolm Turnbull was the first candidate to announce his intention to lead the party and was said to have the largest support from Liberal MPs going into the ballot. Biographer Paddy Manning regards Turnbull's decision to criticise Howard over not apologising to the Stolen Generation as sending votes to Nelson.

Turnbull and Abbott proposed that the party should drop its support for the WorkChoices legislation following their defeat in the federal election. However Nelson said he would not support undoing WorkChoices.

== Outcome ==
Brendan Nelson won the ballot for leader against Malcolm Turnbull, by 45 votes to 42. Julie Bishop was elected deputy leader with 44 votes, against 25 for Andrew Robb and 18 for Christopher Pyne.

=== Leadership ballot ===
Liberal Party of Australia deputy leadership ballot, 2007
- 29 November 2007
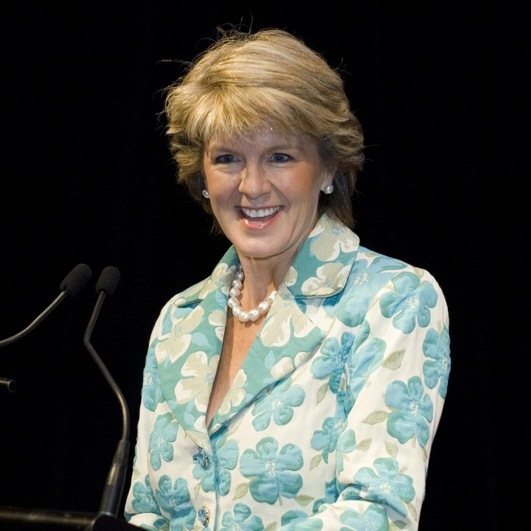

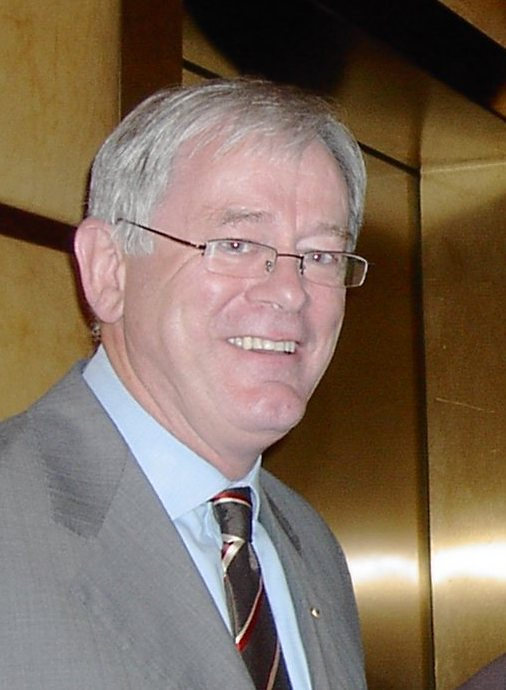

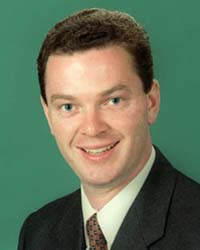
| Candidate | Julie Bishop | Andrew Robb | Christopher Pyne |
| Caucus vote | 44 (50.6%) | 25 (28.7%) | 18 (20.7%) |
| Seat | Curtin (WA) | Goldstein (Vic.) | Sturt (SA) |
Deputy Leader before election
Peter Costello
Elected Deputy Leader
Julie Bishop

| Candidate | Votes | % |
|---|---|---|
| Brendan Nelson | 45 | 51.7 |
| Malcolm Turnbull | 42 | 48.4 |

=== Deputy leadership ballot ===
| Candidate | Votes | % |
|---|---|---|
| Julie Bishop | 44 | 50.6 |
| Andrew Robb | 25 | 28.7 |
| Christopher Pyne | 18 | 20.7 |

Following this leadership spill Liberal MP Christopher Pyne floated the idea of the party electing future leaders by all party members not just Liberal MPs but to this day parliamentary Liberal members still retain the sole right in electing the leader.

== See also ==
- 2008 Liberal Party of Australia leadership spill
- 2009 Liberal Party of Australia leadership spill
