= Battle Lines =

Battle Lines may refer to:

- "Battle Lines" (Star Trek: Deep Space Nine), first-season episode of Star Trek: Deep Space Nine
- Voice Mail, a 1995 album by John Wetton re-released internationally as Battle Lines
- Battle Lines (Bob Moses album), 2018

== See also ==
- Battlelines, a 2009 book by Tony Abbott
- Battleline Publications
- Line of battle
