= Australians for Constitutional Monarchy =

Anti-republican advocacy group

- Formation: June 1992 (inaugural council); March 1993 (registered as a company)
- Founders: Michael Kirby; Lloyd Waddy
- Legal status: Public company limited by guarantee (1993–present)
- National Convener: David Flint (Since 1998)
- Executive Director: Jai Martinkovits (since 2011)
- Young National Convener: Daniel Lahood
- Website: www.norepublic.com.au

Australians for Constitutional Monarchy (ACM) is a group that aims to preserve Australia's constitutional monarchy, with Charles III as King of Australia. The group states that it is a non-partisan, not-for-profit organisation whose role is "To preserve, to protect and to defend our heritage: the Australian constitutional system, the role of the Crown in it and our Flag".

== Past activities ==
On 4 June 1992 Australians for Constitutional Monarchy held their first public meeting at Sydney Town Hall attended by about 450 people. The foundation council included the former Chief Justice of the High Court, Sir Harry Gibbs; the Chancellor of Sydney University, Dame Leonie Kramer; former Sydney Lord Mayor, Mr Doug Sutherland; the President of the NSW Court of Appeal, Justice Michael Kirby; former Liberal Party Federal President, Sir John Atwill; and Mr Barry O'Keefe QC.

=== 1999 republic referendum ===
Australians for Constitutional Monarchy was active in challenging Australia's republican organisations and playing a key role in the "No Republic" campaign during the lead up to Australia's 1999 republic referendum, receiving 73.39% of the constitutional monarchist vote for the 1998 Constitutional Convention. Kerry Jones, ACM's Executive Director was appointed by the Prime Minister as Chairman of the official Vote No Committee, while Malcolm Turnbull became Chairman of the Vote Yes Committee. On the basis of votes won in the Convention election, ACM received eight seats and independent republicans two. Over 50,000 supporters worked in the ACM campaign across the Commonwealth, with full-time directors being appointed in all states and the ACT, reporting to a full-time National Campaign Director. Coordinators were appointed in each of the Federal electorates, 72% of whom subsequently voted No, with the national Yes vote totalling 45%.

=== Government House protest ===
The group also organised a public protest against the eviction of New South Wales Governor Gordon Samuels from Government House by Premier Bob Carr, in 1996. The march blocked Macquarie Street with over 20,000 people, the largest monarchist or republican demonstration in Australia. The campaign was revived in 2007, with a brochure being distributed and candidates being asked their views in the state election. Active campaigning continued and in 2011, Premier Barry O'Farrell agreed to return Governor Marie Bashir to Government House.

== Chairs ==
#	Chair	Start	End	Time in position
1	Lloyd Waddy AM QC	1992	1998	6 years
2	David Flint AM	1998	present	28 years

== Current activities ==
Today, the organisation, which describes itself as a "grassroots community organisation", continues to advocate the retention of constitutional monarchy as the preferred model of governance for Australia.

Primary amongst the group's activities is the publication of news and information about Australia's constitution, government, and Crown. Such information is published on their official site in the form of information sheets or by way of an opinion column from the National Convenor and in its many publications. These include materials and books discussing a variety of topics related to Australia's Crown. During the referendum campaign, these included the Vote No papers and David Flint's Cane Toad Republic. After the referendum, Kerry Jones's story of the campaign, The People's Protest was published.

In December 2006, Tony Abbott, the then Minister for Health, launched an ACM monograph Her Majesty at 80: Impeccable Service in an Indispensable Office, with a foreword by Abbott, and written by Flint.

== Arguments ==
ACM argues against the proposal by some republicans to have a series of plebiscites and referendums to achieve a republic, while also criticising the lack of a specific republican model. ACM also opposes the use of plebiscites, which it claims can be abused, and liken to a "blank cheque". They argue that the Constitution requires a referendum before any constitutional change, where all the details of change are given before and not after the vote. They also argue the republicans are demanding change, without having any idea of the change they want. ACM conducted an "information campaign" to inform voters of the perceived negative aspects of the plan, and during the 2004 federal election, approximately one million pamphlets on this subject were distributed in selected electorates. ACM also advises its supporters of which electoral candidates support the present constitutional monarchy.

ACM currently makes a point of fighting what Michael Kirby called "a republic by stealth," which they define as subtle removal of the Crown from Australian life. These include removals of references to the Crown from oaths and legislation, the replacement of the position of King's Counsel in some states with that of Senior Counsel. More recently, one of their key campaigns has been opposing the removal of the Governor of New South Wales from Government House by the Carr government. It was a campaign they won with Governor Marie Bashir being returned to Government House in 2011.

ACM also objected to the plan by organisers of the 2006 Commonwealth Games, being held in Melbourne, to not include a playing of the Australian Royal Anthem at the opening of the Games, where the Queen would be present, declaring this to be a rebuff to the monarch. Young ACM supporters distributed sheets setting out the words of the National and Royal Anthems to the crowds going into the opening ceremony. In the end, the attendees in the stadium joined Dame Kiri Te Kanawa in singing "Happy Birthday" as well as eight bars of the Royal Anthem. In the same year, ACM led the opposition to the campaign by the Australian Republican Movement, named "A Mate for a Head of State".

== Membership ==
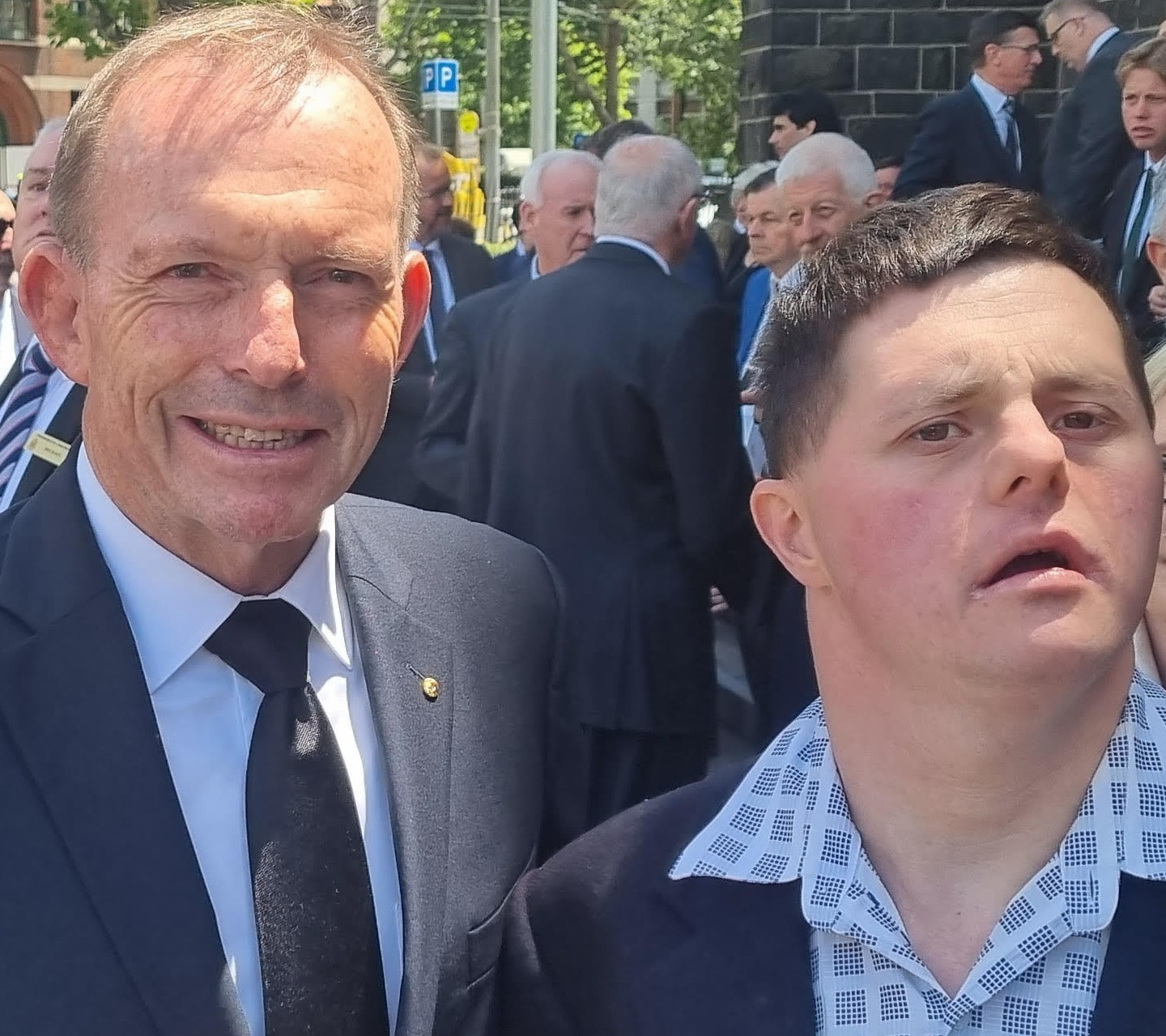
Tony Abbott pictured here with a man with Downn Syndrome, Prime Minister of Australia from 2013 to 2015 is a renowned monarchist

The ACM has members who support the charter as well as members of the company limited by guarantee which undertakes the financial and management responsibility of the organization.

The original Foundation Council included people such as Michael Kirby (a former Justice of the High Court), Justice Lloyd Waddy, Dame Leonie Kramer, Barry O'Keefe, Helen Sham-Ho, and others, including the late Neville Bonner, Dr. Margaret Olley, Sir Harry Gibbs, and Sir John Atwill. The first National Executive Director was Tony Abbott, who served between 1992 and 1994, with Justice Waddy serving as the organisations first National Convenor. During Abbott's time, a group for under 30s - Young Australians for Constitutional Monarchy - was founded by Jason Groves. When he moved to the United Kingdom in 1998, he was succeeded by Julian Leeser. Groves has been UK Convenor of ACM since that time.

When Abbott was elected to Parliament in 1994, he was succeeded by Kerry Jones, with Justice Waddy later being succeeded by Professor David Flint, the current National Convener. In 2007, Thomas Flynn succeeded Kerry Jones as executive director.

== See also ==
- Australian Monarchist League
- Australian Constitution
- Australian Constitutional history
- Constitutional Monarchy
- International Monarchist League
- Monarchist League of Canada
- Australian republicanism
- Australian Republican Movement
