= Tony Abbott =

Prime Minister of Australia from 2013 to 2015

The Honourable Tony Abbott AC
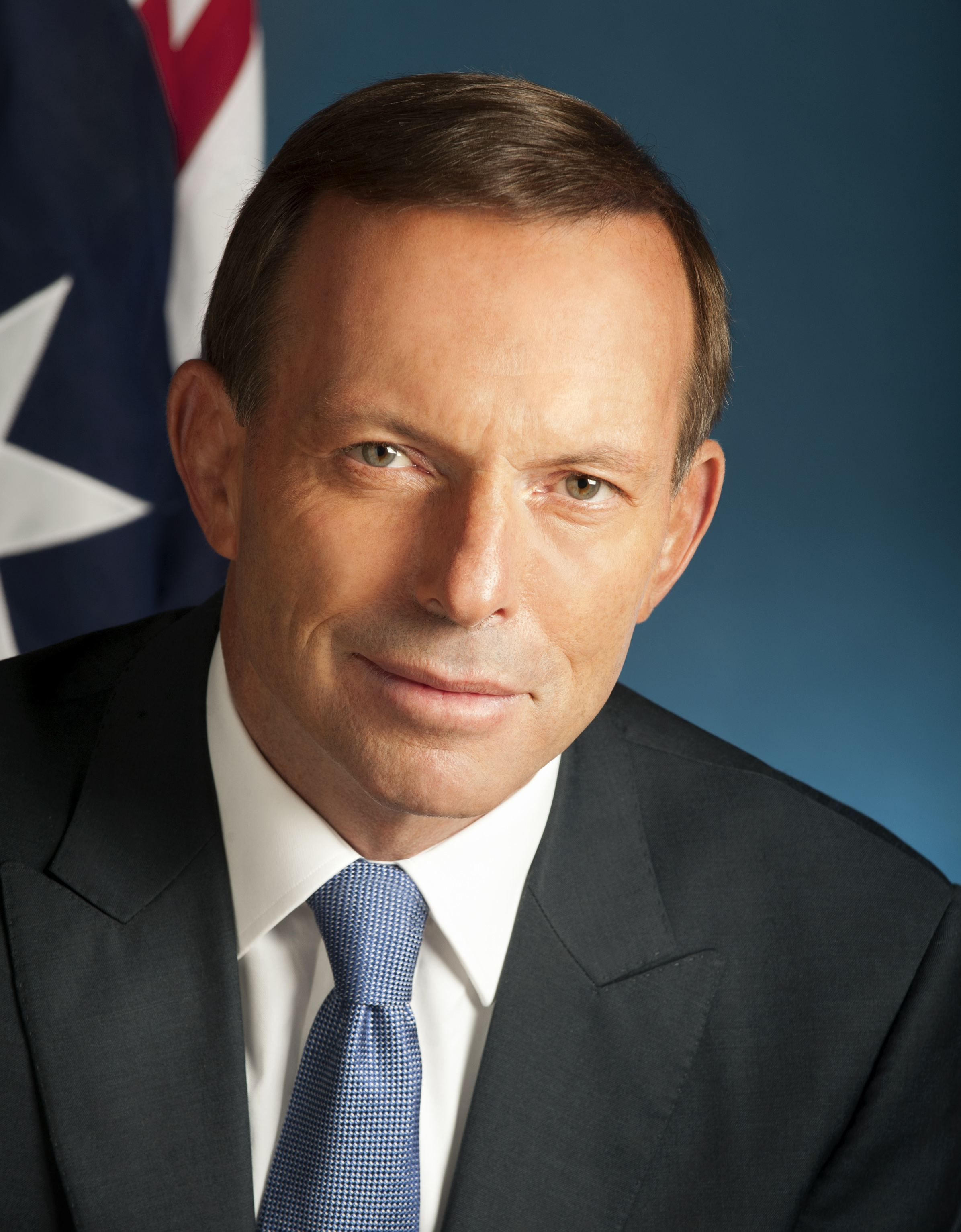
- Official portrait, 2013

President of the Liberal Party
- Incumbent
- Assumed office 29 May 2026
- Leader: Angus Taylor
- Preceded by: John Olsen

28th Prime Minister of Australia
- In office 18 September 2013 – 15 September 2015
- Monarch: Elizabeth II
- Governors General: Dame Quentin Bryce; Sir Peter Cosgrove
- Deputy: Warren Truss
- Preceded by: Kevin Rudd
- Succeeded by: Malcolm Turnbull

Leader of the Opposition
- In office 1 December 2009 – 18 September 2013
- Prime Minister: Kevin Rudd; Julia Gillard
- Deputy: Julie Bishop
- Preceded by: Malcolm Turnbull
- Succeeded by: Chris Bowen

Leader of the Liberal Party
- In office 1 December 2009 – 14 September 2015
- Deputy: Julie Bishop
- Preceded by: Malcolm Turnbull
- Succeeded by: Malcolm Turnbull
Cabinet Positions
Leader of the House
In office 12 February 2002 – 3 December 2007
Prime Minister	John Howard
Preceded by	Peter Reith
Succeeded by	Anthony Albanese
Minister for Health and Ageing
In office 7 October 2003 – 3 December 2007
Prime Minister	John Howard
Deputy	Christopher Pyne
Preceded by	Kay Patterson
Succeeded by	Nicola Roxon
Minister Assisting the Prime Minister for the Public Service
In office 26 November 2001 – 7 October 2003
Prime Minister	John Howard
Preceded by	David Kemp
Succeeded by	Kevin Andrews
Minister for Employment and Workplace Relations
In office 30 January 2001 – 7 October 2003
Prime Minister	John Howard
Deputy	Mal Brough
Preceded by	Peter Reith
Succeeded by	Kevin Andrews
Minister for Employment Services
In office 21 October 1998 – 30 January 2001
Prime Minister	John Howard
Leader	Peter Reith
Preceded by	Chris Ellison
Succeeded by	Mal Brough

Member of the Australian Parliament for Warringah
- In office 26 March 1994 – 18 May 2019
- Preceded by: Michael MacKellar
- Succeeded by: Zali Steggall

Adviser to the UK Board of Trade
- In office 4 September 2020 – October 2024
- Appointed by: Liz Truss
- President: Liz Truss; Anne-Marie Trevelyan; Kemi Badenoch; Jonathan Reynolds
- Prime Minister: Boris Johnson; Liz Truss; Rishi Sunak; Keir Starmer

Director of the Australians for Constitutional Monarchy Group
- In office 4 June 1992 – 18 February 1994
- Preceded by: organisation established
- Succeeded by: Kerry Jones

Personal details
- Born: Anthony John Abbott; 4 November 1957 (age 69) Lambeth, London, England
- Citizenship: Australia; United Kingdom (until 1993)
- Party: Liberal
- Spouse: Margie Aitken (m. 1988)
- Children: 3
- Education: University of Sydney (BEc, LLB); The Queen's College, Oxford (MA)
- Profession: Journalist; businessman; politician
- Website: www.tonyabbott.com.au
- Tony Abbott's voice Abbott speaking about Australia's relationship with Latin America; 29 May 2014

Anthony John Abbott (/ˈæbət/; born 4 November 1957) is an Australian politician who served as the 28th prime minister of Australia from 2013 to 2015, holding office as the leader of the Liberal Party. He was the member of Parliament (MP) for the New South Wales division of Warringah from 1994 to 2019 and is the current president of the Liberal Party.

Born in England, Abbott studied economics and law at the University of Sydney before attending Oxford University as a Rhodes Scholar. Prior to entering politics, he trained briefly for the priesthood and worked in journalism and political advisory roles. Abbott entered parliament at the 1994 Warringah by-election and rose through the ranks during the Howard government, serving in various ministerial roles, including Health and Ageing. In 2009, he challenged and defeated Malcolm Turnbull in a leadership spill over Turnbull's support for the Labor Party's Emissions Trading Scheme. Abbott subsequently led the Coalition to the 2010 federal election, which resulted in a hung parliament, and then to a landslide victory at the 2013 election.

As prime minister, Abbott's government introduced Operation Sovereign Borders, repealed the carbon pricing scheme and the mining tax, and pursued budget austerity measures. His administration launched several initiatives including the Medical Research Future Fund, trade agreements with China, Japan and South Korea, and the New Colombo Plan. Abbott also committed troops to the fight against ISIS and pledged to resettle 12,000 Syrian refugees. Domestically, he advocated for constitutional recognition of Indigenous Australians and a plebiscite on same-sex marriage.

Abbott's leadership faced widespread criticism over unpopular budget cuts and declining public support, culminating in his replacement by Malcolm Turnbull in 2015. He remained in parliament until his defeat at the 2019 election by independent Zali Steggall. In 2020, Abbott was appointed to the UK Board of Trade and continues to engage in public discourse as a writer and speaker, championing conservative viewpoints. In 2026, he was elected as the federal president of the Liberal Party, a primarily administrative role within the party.

== Early life ==
=== Birth and family background ===
Abbott was born on 4 November 1957 at the General Lying-In Hospital in Lambeth, London, England. He is the oldest of four children born to Fay (née Peters; 1933–2025) and Richard Henry "Dick" Abbott (1924–2017). He has three younger sisters, including Christine Forster, who has also been involved in politics. His mother was born in Sydney, while his father was born in Newcastle upon Tyne, England.

At age 16, Dick Abbott moved to Australia with his parents. Two years later, in 1942, he was called up to the Royal Australian Air Force. Dick Abbott and his mother returned to the UK in 1954 where he met and married Fay Peters, a dietitian.

=== Childhood and education ===
On 7 September 1960, Abbott, his parents, and younger sister Jane, left the UK for Australia on the Assisted Passage Migration Scheme ship SS Oronsay. Settling in Sydney, the family first lived in the suburb of Bronte and later moved to Chatswood. Dick Abbott established what was to become one of the largest orthodontics practices in Australia, retiring in 2002.

Abbott attended primary school at St Aloysius' College at Milsons Point, before completing his secondary school education at St Ignatius' College, Riverview, both Jesuit schools. During his time at St Ignatius' College, one of his teachers was John Kennedy, who would later go on to serve as the member for Hawthorn. He graduated with a Bachelor of Economics (BEc) in 1979 and a Bachelor of Laws (LLB) in 1981 from the University of Sydney. He resided at St John's College and was president of the Student Representative Council. Influenced by his chaplain at St Ignatius', Father Emmet Costello, he then attended The Queen's College, Oxford, as a Rhodes Scholar, where in June 1983 he graduated as a Bachelor of Arts in Philosophy, Politics and Economics (PPE) and on 21 October 1989 proceeded by seniority to Master of Arts.

During his university days, Abbott gained media attention for political opposition to the then dominant left-wing student leadership. Once he was violently beaten at a university conference. According to the Sun-Herald newspaper, it was "an ugly and often violent time", and Abbott's tactics in student politics were like "an aggressive terrier". Abbott organised rallies in support of Governor-General John Kerr after he dismissed the Whitlam government in November 1975, as well as a pro-Falklands War demonstration during his time at Oxford. At St. Ignatius College, Abbott had been taught and influenced by the Jesuits. At university, he encountered B. A. Santamaria, a Catholic layman who led a movement against Communism within the Australian labour movement in the 1950s, culminating in the 1955 Labor Party split and the formation of the Democratic Labor Party. Santamaria has been described as Abbott's "political hero". He wrote the foreword to a novelisation of Santamaria's life written by Alan Reid, and in 2015 launched a biography of Santamaria written by Gerard Henderson. In 1977, Abbott faced charges of common and indecent assault after allegedly groping trainee teacher Helen Wilson while she was making a speech at the College of Advanced Education in Kuring-gai, Sydney. Abbott pleaded not guilty, and the charges were ultimately dropped.

Abbott was a student boxer, earning two Blues for boxing while at Oxford.

When Abbott was a student, on one occasion he rescued a child who had been pulled out into the sea by the current. On another occasion, while drinking at a pub, he helped rescue children from the burning house next door. On both of these occasions, he left the scene after the rescues and did not wait to be thanked.

=== Early adult life and pre-political career ===
Following his time in Britain, Abbott returned to Australia and told his family of his intention to join the priesthood. In 1984 at the age of 26, he entered St Patrick's Seminary, Manly. Abbott did not complete his studies at the seminary, leaving the institution in 1987. Interviewed before the 2013 election, Abbott said of his time as a trainee priest: "The Jesuits had helped to instil in me this thought that our calling in life was to be, to use the phrase: 'a man for others'. And I thought then that the best way in which I could be a 'man for others' was to become a priest. I discovered pretty soon that I was a bit of a square peg in a round hole ... eventually working out that, I'm afraid, I just didn't have what it took to be an effective priest."

Abbott worked in journalism, briefly ran a concrete plant, and began to get involved in national politics. Throughout his time as a student and seminarian, he was writing articles for newspapers and magazines—first for Honi Soit (the University of Sydney student newspaper) and later The Catholic Weekly and national publications such as The Bulletin. He eventually became a journalist and wrote for The Australian.

At birth, Abbott was a British citizen by birth in the UK and by descent from his British-born father. He did not hold Australian citizenship from birth, as at the time Australian citizenship by descent could only be acquired from the father. Abbott became a naturalised Australian citizen on 26 June 1981, apparently so as to become eligible for a Rhodes scholarship. On 12 October 1993, he renounced his British citizenship to be eligible to run for parliament under section 44 of the constitution.

== Political career ==
=== Early career ===
Abbott began his public life when he was employed as a journalist for The Bulletin, an influential news magazine, and later for The Australian newspaper. While deciding his future career path, Abbott developed friendships with senior figures in the New South Wales Labor Party, and was encouraged by Bob Carr, as well as Johno Johnson, to join the Labor Party and run for office. Abbott felt uncomfortable with the role of unions within the party, however, and wrote in his biography that he felt Labor "just wasn't the party for me".

From 1990 to 1993, he was press secretary to Liberal Leader John Hewson, helping to develop the Fightback! policy. Prime Minister John Howard wrote in his autobiography that Abbott considered working on his staff before accepting the position with The Bulletin, and it was on Howard's recommendation that Hewson engaged Abbott. According to Howard, he and Abbott established a good rapport, but Hewson and Abbott fell out shortly before the 1993 election, and Abbott ended up in search of work following the re-election of the Keating government. He was approached to head Australians for Constitutional Monarchy (ACM), the main group organising support for the maintenance of the Monarchy in Australia amidst the Keating government's campaign for a change to a republic. Abbott renounced his British citizenship in 1993. Between 1993 and 1994, Abbott was an executive director of ACM. According to biographer Michael Duffy, Abbott's involvement with ACM "strengthened his relationship with John Howard, who in 1994 suggested he seek pre-selection for a by-election in the seat of Warringah". Howard provided a glowing reference and Abbott won pre-selection for the safe Liberal seat.

Despite his conservative leanings, Abbott acknowledged he voted for Labor in the 1988 NSW state election as he thought that "Barrie Unsworth was the best deal Premier that New South Wales had ever had". Nevertheless, Abbott then clarified that he has never voted for Labor in a federal election.

=== Member of Parliament, 1994–2009 ===
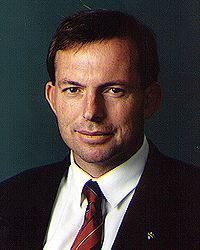
Tony Abbott in 1996

Abbott won Liberal preselection for the federal Division of Warringah by-election in March 1994 following the resignation of Michael MacKellar. He easily held the safe Liberal seat in the Liberals' traditional Northern Beaches heartland, suffering a swing of only 1 percentage point in the primary vote. He easily won the seat in his own right at the 1996 general election. Before 2019, he only dropped below 59 percent of the two-party vote once, in 2001; that year independent Peter Macdonald, the former member for the state seat of Manly, held Abbott to only 55 percent.

Abbott was the parliamentary secretary to the Minister for Employment, Education, Training and Youth Affairs (1996–1998), Minister for Employment Services (1998–2001), Minister for Employment and Workplace Relations and Small Business (2001), Minister for Employment and Workplace Relations (2001–03) and Minister for Health and Ageing from 2003 to November 2007. From early 2002 to October 2007, he was also the Leader of the House in the House of Representatives.

In 1998, Abbott established a trust fund called "Australians for Honest Politics Trust" to help bankroll civil court cases against the One Nation Party and its leader Pauline Hanson. Prime Minister John Howard denied any knowledge of existence of such a fund. Abbott was also accused of offering funds to One Nation dissident Terry Sharples to support his court battle against the party. However, Howard defended the honesty of Abbott in this matter. Abbott conceded that the political threat One Nation posed to the Howard government was "a very big factor" in his decision to pursue the legal attack, but he also claimed to be acting "in Australia's national interest". Howard also defended Abbott's actions saying "It's the job of the Liberal Party to politically attack other parties – there's nothing wrong with that."

As a Parliamentary Secretary, Abbott oversaw the establishment of the Green Corps program which involved young people in environmental restoration work. As Minister for Employment Services, he oversaw the implementation of the Job Network and was responsible for the government's Work for the Dole scheme. He also commissioned the Cole Royal Commission into "thuggery and rorts" in the construction industry and created the Office of the Australian Building and Construction Commissioner in response and to lift productivity.

The Liberal Party allowed members a free choice in the 1999 republic referendum. Abbott was one of the leading voices within the party campaigning for the successful "No" vote, pitting him against future parliamentary colleague and leading republican Malcolm Turnbull.

==== Cabinet minister (1998–2007) ====
When Abbott was promoted to the Cabinet in 1998, Prime Minister Howard described him as an effective performer with an endearing style, whereas the Opposition described him as a "bomb thrower". Howard appointed Abbott to replace Kay Patterson as Minister for Health in 2003, during a period of contentious Medicare reform and a crisis in Medical indemnity Insurance, in which the price of insurance was forcing doctors out of practice. The Australian Medical Association was threatening to pull out all Australian doctors. Abbott worked with the states to address the crisis and keep the system running.

Health care initiatives instigated by Abbott include the Nurse Family Partnership, a long term scheme aimed at improving conditions for indigenous youth by improving mother-child relationships. The scheme was successful in reducing child abuse and improving school retention rates.

In 2005, Abbott was holidaying with his family in Bali when the Bali bombings occurred. Abbott visited the victims of the bombings in hospital, and in his capacity as Health Minister organised for Australians who required lifesaving emergency surgery and hospitalisation to be flown to Singapore.

In 2006, Abbott controversially opposed access to the abortion drug RU486, and the Parliament voted to strip Health Ministers of the power to regulate this area of policy. During this time, Abbott likened the act of having an abortion to committing a murder, saying "we have a bizarre double standard, a bizarre double standard in this country where someone who kills a pregnant woman's baby is guilty of murder but a woman who aborts an unborn baby is simply exercising choice".

Abbott introduced the Medicare Safety Net to cap the annual out-of-pocket costs of Medicare cardholders to a maximum amount. In 2007, he attracted criticism over long delays in funding for cancer diagnostic equipment (PET scanners).

According to Sydney Morning Herald's political editor, Peter Hartcher, before the defeat of the Howard government at the 2007 election, Abbott had opposed the government's centrepiece WorkChoices industrial relations deregulation reform in Cabinet, on the basis that the legislation exceeded the government's mandate, was harsh on workers, and was politically dangerous to the government. John Howard wrote in his 2010 autobiography that Abbott was "never a zealot about pursuing industrial relations changes" and expressed "concern about making too many changes" during Cabinet's discussion of WorkChoices.

Abbott campaigned as Minister for Health at the 2007 election. On 31 October, he apologised for saying "just because a person is sick doesn't mean that he is necessarily pure of heart in all things", after Bernie Banton, an asbestos campaigner and terminal mesothelioma sufferer, complained that Abbott was unavailable to collect a petition. In The Australian Doctor's 2015 poll, Abbott was ranked as the third "worst health minister in 35 years", as voted on by doctors. Peter Dutton was ranked the overall worst.

==== Shadow minister (2007–2009) ====
The Coalition lost government in 2007 and Abbott was re-elected to the seat of Warringah with a 1.8-point swing toward the Labor Party. Following Peter Costello's rejection of the leadership of the Parliamentary Liberal Party, Abbott nominated for the position of party leader, along with Malcolm Turnbull and Brendan Nelson. After canvassing the support of his colleagues, Abbott decided to withdraw his nomination. He seemingly did not have the numbers, noting that he was "obviously very closely identified with the outgoing prime minister". He said he would not rule out contesting the leadership at some time in the future. Of the three candidates, Abbott was the only one who had previous experience in Opposition. Nelson was elected Liberal leader in December 2007 and Abbott was assigned the Shadow Portfolio of Families, Community Services and Indigenous Affairs. As indigenous affairs spokesman, Abbott said that it had been a mistake for the Howard government not to offer a national apology to the Stolen Generations; spent time teaching at remote Aboriginal communities; and argued for the Rudd government to continue the Northern Territory National Emergency Response which restricted alcohol and introduced conditional welfare in certain Aboriginal communities.

During this period in Opposition, Abbott wrote Battlelines, a biography and reflection on the Howard government, and potential future policy direction for the Liberal Party. In the book, Abbott said that in certain aspects the Australian Federation was "dysfunctional" and in need of repair. He recommended the establishment of local hospital and school boards to manage health and education, and discussed family law reform, multiculturalism, climate change, and international relations. The book received a favourable review from former Labor Party speech writer Bob Ellis and The Australian described it as "read almost universally as Abbott's intellectual application for the party's leadership after the Turnbull experiment".

The number of unauthorised immigrant arrivals in boats to Australia increased during 2008. Abbott claimed that this was an effect of the Rudd government's easing of border protection laws and accused Kevin Rudd of ineptitude and hypocrisy on the issue of unauthorised immigrants upon boats arriving, particularly during the Oceanic Viking affair of October 2009, saying, "John Howard found a problem and created a solution. Kevin Rudd found a solution and has now created a problem".

During November 2009, Abbott resigned from shadow ministerial responsibilities due to the Liberal Party's position on the Rudd government's Emissions trading Scheme (ETS), leading to the resignation of other shadow ministers.

== Leader of the Opposition (2009–2013) ==
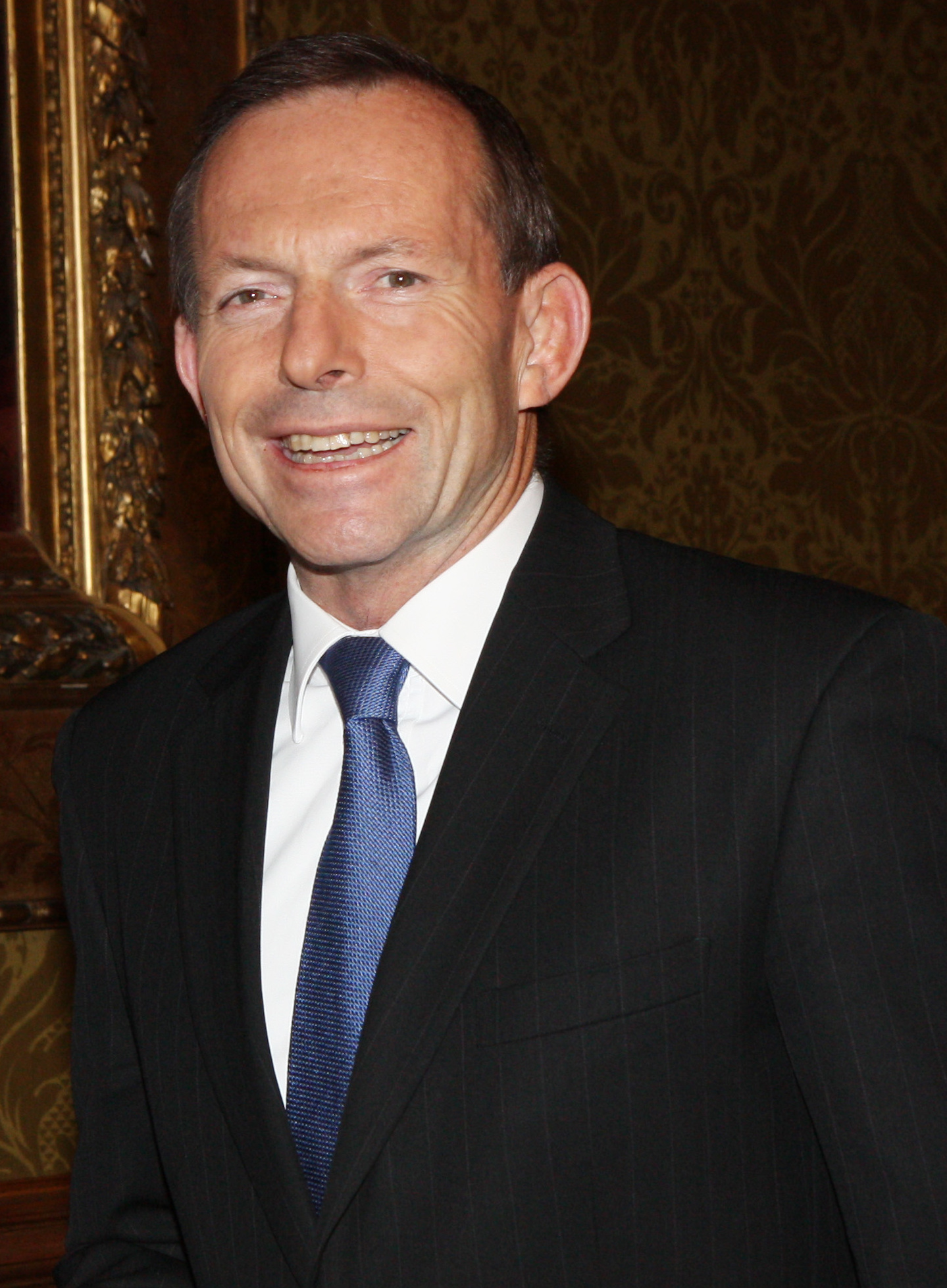
Abbott in 2012 as leader of the Opposition

On 1 December 2009, Abbott was elected to the position of Leader of the Liberal Party of Australia over Turnbull and Shadow Treasurer Joe Hockey. Abbott proposed blocking the government's ETS in the Senate whereas Turnbull sought to amend the bill which the majority of the Liberal Party did not support. Abbott named his Shadow Cabinet on 8 December 2009.

Abbott, while previously expressing support for emissions trading in Battlelines, became a vocal critic of carbon pricing, labelling it a "great big new tax on everything". He reversed the Coalition's earlier bipartisan support for an emissions trading scheme. The Labor government's Carbon Pricing Mechanism, introduced in 2012, aimed for a 5% reduction in emissions by 2020. Abbott's alternative, the Direct Action plan, centred on an Emissions Reduction Fund that offered financial incentives to businesses and farmers to cut emissions.

When appointed to the Liberal leadership, Abbott's Catholicism and moral beliefs became subjects of repeated media questioning. Various commentators suggested that his traditionalist views would polarise female voters. He told press gallery journalist Laurie Oakes that he did not do doorstop interviews in front of church but regularly faced pointed questions about his faith which were not being put to Prime Minister Rudd, who conducted weekly church door press conferences following his attendances at Anglican services.

Abbott reportedly missed the 2009 vote on the Rudd government $42 billion stimulus package because he fell asleep in his parliamentary office after a night of drinking. When asked by a journalist whether he had been drunk, Abbott said "that is an impertinent question" and that he "wasn't keeping count" but thought it was "maybe two" bottles of wine.

In a 60 Minutes interview aired on 7 March 2010, Abbott was asked: "Homosexuality? How do you feel about that?". He replied: "I'd probably feel a bit threatened ... it's a fact of life and I try to treat people as people and not put them in pigeonholes." In later interviews Abbott apologised for the remark. In 2013, Abbott stated on 3AW that if his sister Christine Forster were to have a marriage ceremony with her partner Virginia he would attend.

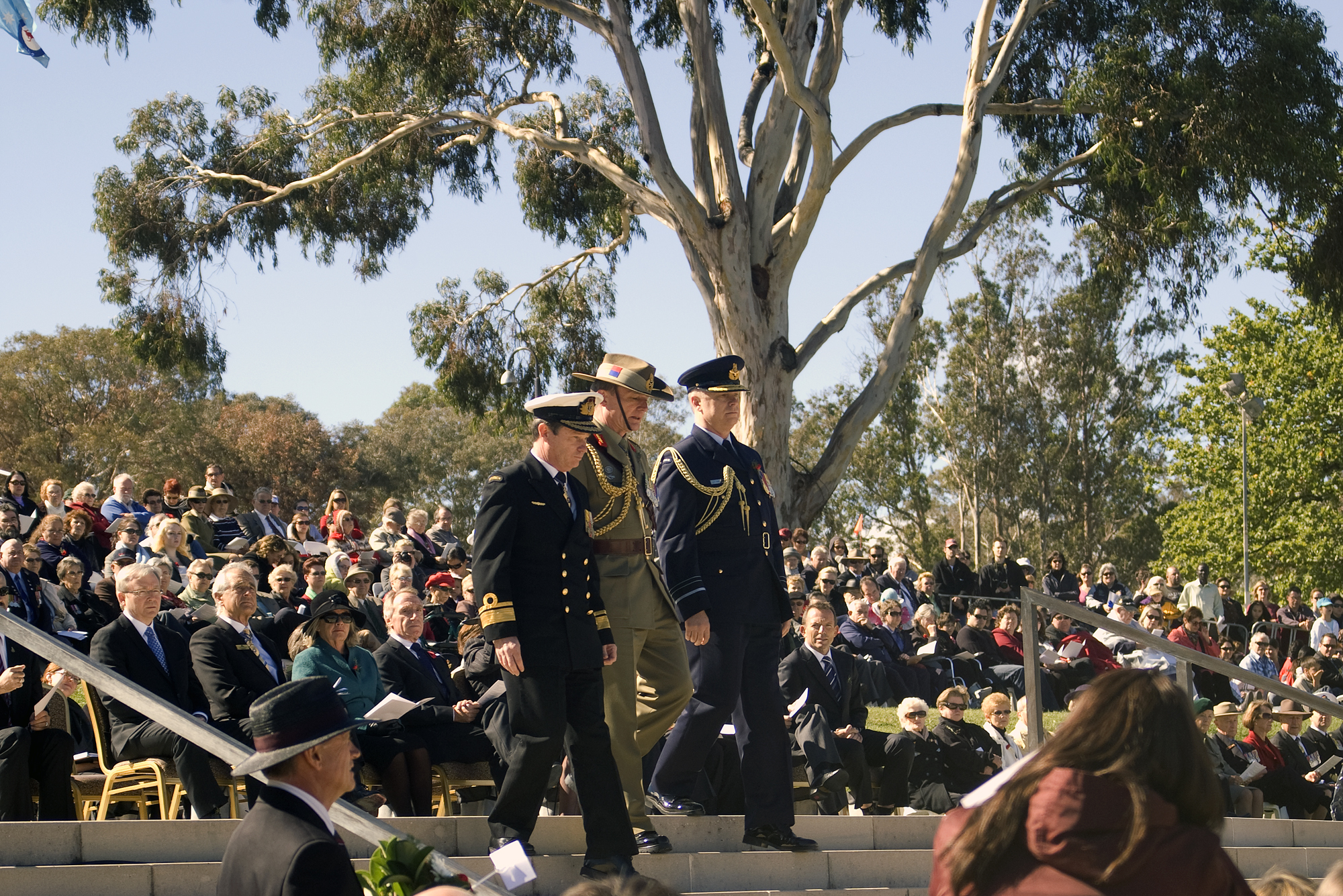
Attending the 2010 Anzac Day National Service at the Australian War Memorial in Canberra

In March 2010, Abbott, announced a new policy initiative to provide for six months paid parental leave, funded by an increase in corporate tax by 1.7 percentage points on all taxable company income above $5 million. Business groups and the government opposed the plan, however it won support from the Australian Greens.

While Opposition Spokesman for Indigenous Affairs, Abbott spent time in remote Cape York Aboriginal communities as a teacher, organised through prominent indigenous activist Noel Pearson. Abbott repeatedly spoke of his admiration for Pearson, and in March 2010, introduced the Wild Rivers (Environmental Management) Bill to Parliament in support of Pearson's campaign to overturn the Queensland government's Wild Rivers legislation. Abbott and Pearson believed that the Queensland law would 'block the economic development' of indigenous land, and interfere with Aboriginal land rights.

Abbott completed an Ironman Triathlon event in March 2010 at Port Macquarie, New South Wales. In April he set out on a 9-day charity bike ride between Melbourne and Sydney, the annual Pollie Pedal, generating political debate about whether he should have committed so much time to physical fitness. Abbott described the events as an opportunity to "stop at lots of little towns along the way where people probably never see or don't very often see a federal member of Parliament."

In his first Budget reply speech as Opposition Leader, Abbott sought to portray the Rudd government's third budget as a "tax and spend" budget and promised to fight the election on the new mining "super-profits" tax proposed by Rudd.

=== 2010 election ===
On 24 June 2010, Julia Gillard replaced Kevin Rudd as Australian Labor Party leader and prime minister. The replacement of a first-term prime minister was unusual in Australian political history and the Rudd-Gillard rivalry remained a vexed issue for the Gillard government into the 2010 election and its subsequent term. On 17 July, Gillard called the 2010 federal election for 21 August. Polls in the first week gave a view that Labor would be re-elected with an increased majority, with Newspoll and an Essential poll showing a lead of 10 points (55–45) two party preferred.

The two leaders met for one official debate during the campaign. Studio audience surveys by Channel 9 and Seven Network suggested a win to Gillard. Unable to agree on further debates, the leaders went on to appear separately on stage for questioning at community fora in Sydney and Brisbane. In Sydney on 11 August, Abbott's opening statement focused on his main election messages around government debt, taxation and asylum seekers. An exit poll of the Rooty Hill RSL audience accorded Abbott victory. Gillard won the audience poll at Broncos Leagues Club meeting in Brisbane on 18 August. Abbott appeared for public questioning on the ABC's Q&A program on 16 August.

Labor and the Coalition each won 72 seats in the 150-seat House of Representatives, four short of the requirement for majority government, resulting in the first hung parliament since the 1940 election.

Abbott and Gillard commenced a 17-day period of negotiation with crossbenchers over who would form government. On the crossbench, four independent members, one member of the National Party of Western Australia and one member of the Australian Greens held the balance of power. Following the negotiations, Gillard formed a minority government with the support of an Australian Greens MP and three independent MPs on the basis of confidence and supply. Another independent and the WA National gave their confidence and supply support to the Coalition, resulting in Labor holding a 76–74 tally of votes on the floor of the Parliament. The Coalition finished with 49.88 percent of the two party preferred vote, obtaining a national swing of around 2.6 points.

During negotiations, the Independents requested that both major parties' policies be costed by the apolitical Australian Treasury. The Coalition initially resisted the idea, citing concerns over Treasury leaks, however they eventually allowed the analysis. Treasury endorsed Labor's budget costings but projected that Coalition policies would add between $860 million and $4.5 billion to the bottom line over the next four years, rather than the $11.5 billion projected by the Coalition. The close result was lauded by former prime minister John Howard, who wrote in 2010 that Abbott had shifted the dynamic of Australian politics after coming to the leadership in 2009 and "deserves hero status among Liberals".

=== After the 2010 election ===
Following the 2010 election, Abbott and his deputy, Julie Bishop, were re-elected unopposed as leaders of the Liberal Party. Abbott announced his shadow ministry on 14 September, with few changes to senior positions, but with the return of former leadership rival Malcolm Turnbull, whom he selected as Communications spokesman. Abbott announced that he wanted Turnbull to prosecute the Opposition's case against the Gillard government's proposed expenditure on a National Broadband Network.

Following the 2010–2011 Queensland floods, Abbott opposed plans by the Gillard government to impose a "flood levy" on taxpayers to fund reconstruction efforts. Abbott said that funding should be found within the existing budget. Abbott announced a proposal for a taskforce to examine further construction of dams in Australia to deal with flood impact and food security.

In February 2011, Abbott criticised the Gillard government's handling of health reform and proposal for a 50–50 public hospitals funding arrangement with the states and territories, describing the revised Labor Party proposal as "the biggest surrender since Singapore". Although Abbott had previously stated that he considered a carbon tax the best way to set a price on carbon, he opposed Prime Minister Gillard's February 2011 announcement of a proposal for the introduction of a "carbon tax", and called on her to take the issue to an election. Abbott said that Gillard had lied to the electorate over the issue because Gillard and her Treasurer Wayne Swan had ruled out the introduction of a carbon tax in the lead up to the 2010 election.

In April 2011, Abbott proposed consultation with Indigenous people over a bipartisan Federal Government intervention in Northern Territory towns including Alice Springs, Katherine and Tennant Creek, which would cover such areas as police numbers and school attendance in an effort to address what he described as a "failed state" situation. April saw Abbott announce a $430 million policy plan to improve the employment prospects of people with serious mental health problems.

Following the first Gillard government budget in May 2011, Abbott used his budget-reply speech to reiterate his critiques of government policy and call for an early election over the issue of a carbon tax. Rhetorically echoing Liberal party founder, Robert Menzies, Abbott addressed remarks to the "forgotten families".

In June 2011, Abbott for the first time led Gillard in a Newspoll as preferred prime minister. In September 2011, he announced a plan to develop an agricultural food bowl in the north of Australia by developing dams for irrigation and hydroelectricity. Coalition task force leader Andrew Robb claimed that Australia currently produced enough food for 60 million people, but that the Coalition plan could double this to 120 million people by 2040. The head of the Northern Australia Land and Water Taskforce expressed concerns about the economic and environmental viability of this plan as well as its effects on the indigenous Australian communities in northern Australia.

Reflecting on indigenous issues on the occasion of the 40th anniversary of the Aboriginal Tent Embassy on Australia Day 2012, Abbott said that there had been many positive developments in indigenous affairs in recent decades including Rudd's apology and moves to include indigenous Australians in the Australian Constitution. Later that day, Abbott became the target of protesters from the "Embassy" after one of Gillard's advisers contacted a union official who advised Tent Embassy protesters of Abbott's whereabouts and misrepresented Abbott's views on Aboriginal affairs to them, saying he intended to "pull down" the embassy. A major security scare resulted, which was broadcast around the world, resulting in Gillard and Abbott being rushed to a government car amid a throng of security due to fears for their safety.

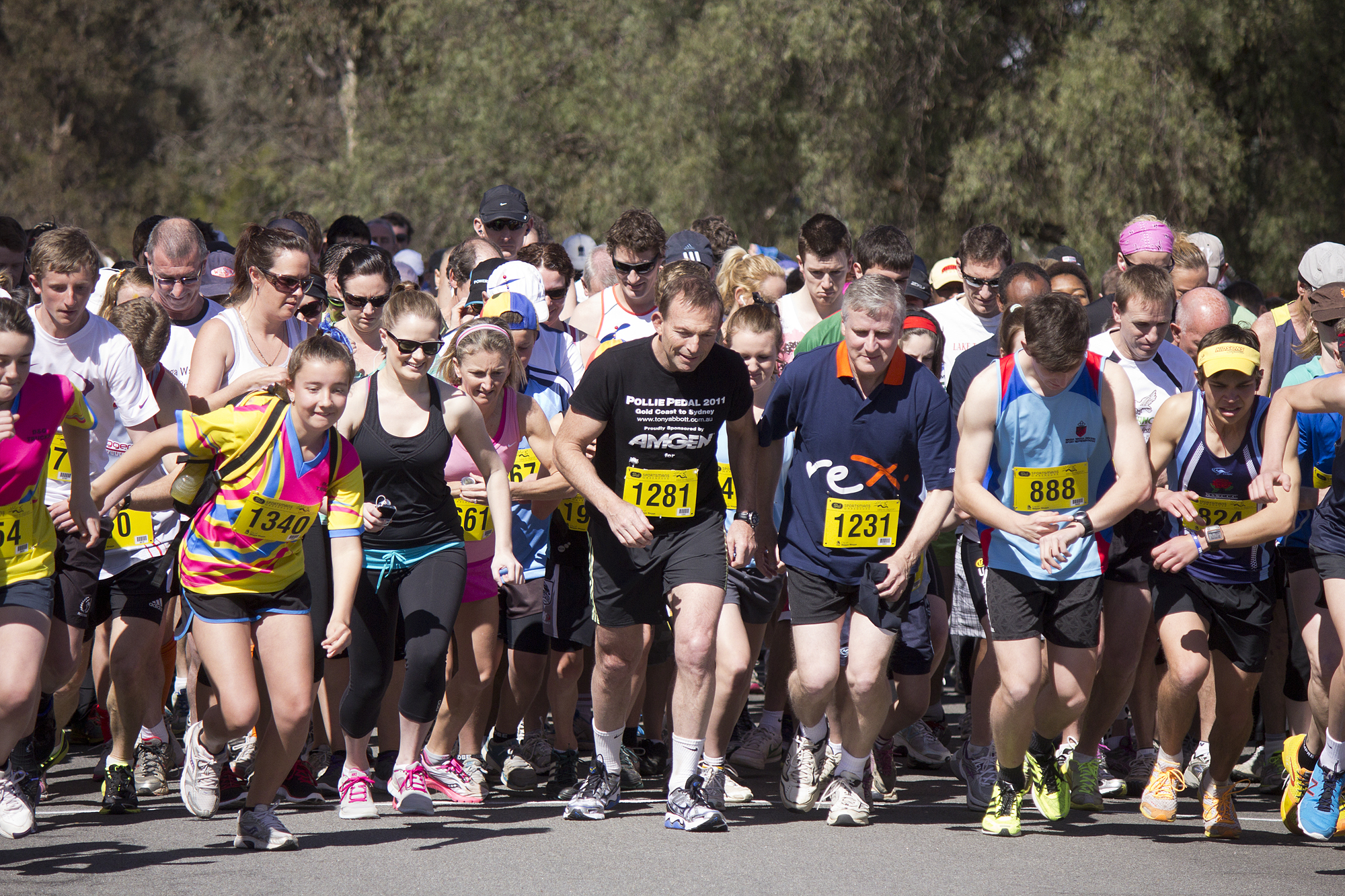
Lake to Lagoon competitors at the starting line, including Tony Abbott, Wagga Wagga, 2012

In an address to the National Press Club on 31 January 2012, Abbott outlined some of his plans for government if elected. These included an intent to live one week of every year in an indigenous Australian community, and to prune government expenditure and cut taxes. Abbott also announced "aspirational" targets for a disability insurance scheme and a subsidised dentistry program once the budget had been restored to "strong surplus".

Abbott responded to the February 2012 Labor leadership crisis by criticising the cross bench independents for keeping Labor in power and renewed his calls for a general election to select the next prime minister of Australia.

In criticising the Gillard government on foreign policy, Abbott said that "foreign policy should have a Jakarta rather than a Geneva focus". Following his attendance at the 10th anniversary commemoration of the Bali bombing in Bali, Abbott travelled to Jakarta with his Shadow Ministers for Foreign Affairs and Immigration for a meeting with Indonesian president Yudhoyono and Foreign Minister Marty Natalegawa. Abbott promised a "no-surprises principle" for dealings with Indonesia. The presidential reception was an unusual occurrence for an opposition leader.

In November 2012, Abbott launched his fourth book, A Strong Australia, a compilation of nine of his "landmark speeches" from 2012, including his budget reply and National Press Club addresses.

==== Gillard misogyny speech ====
On 9 October 2012, Prime Minister Julia Gillard accused Tony Abbott of misogyny and hypocrisy in a speech to Parliament that gained international notice.

== Prime minister (2013–2015) ==
=== Early policy implementation ===
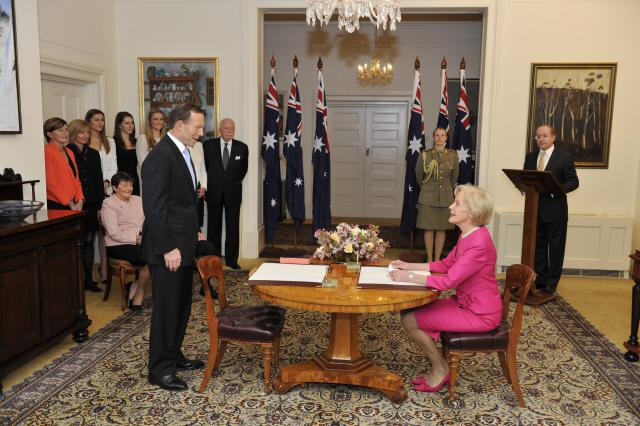
Abbott being sworn in as prime minister by Quentin Bryce, 18 September 2013

At the federal election on 7 September 2013, Abbott led the Liberal–National Coalition to victory over the incumbent Labor government, led by Kevin Rudd. Abbott and his ministry were sworn in on 18 September 2013. He was the subject of criticism for his decision to only include one woman, Deputy Liberal leader Julie Bishop, in his cabinet.

On the first day of the new Parliament, Abbott introduced legislation to repeal the carbon tax, and commenced Operation Sovereign Borders, the Coalition's policy to stop the maritime arrival of asylum seekers, which received strong public support.

Abbott announced a Royal Commission into trade union governance and corruption on 11 February 2014. This was followed by amendments to the Fair Work Act, and a "Repeal Day", where more than 10,000 "red tape" regulations were repealed.

As prime minister, Abbott oversaw free trade agreements signed with Japan, South Korea and China.

The Carbon Tax Repeal Bill passed both houses of Parliament on 17 July 2014 and the Mining Tax Repeal Bill passed both houses of Parliament on 2 September 2014 after negotiations with the Palmer United Party.

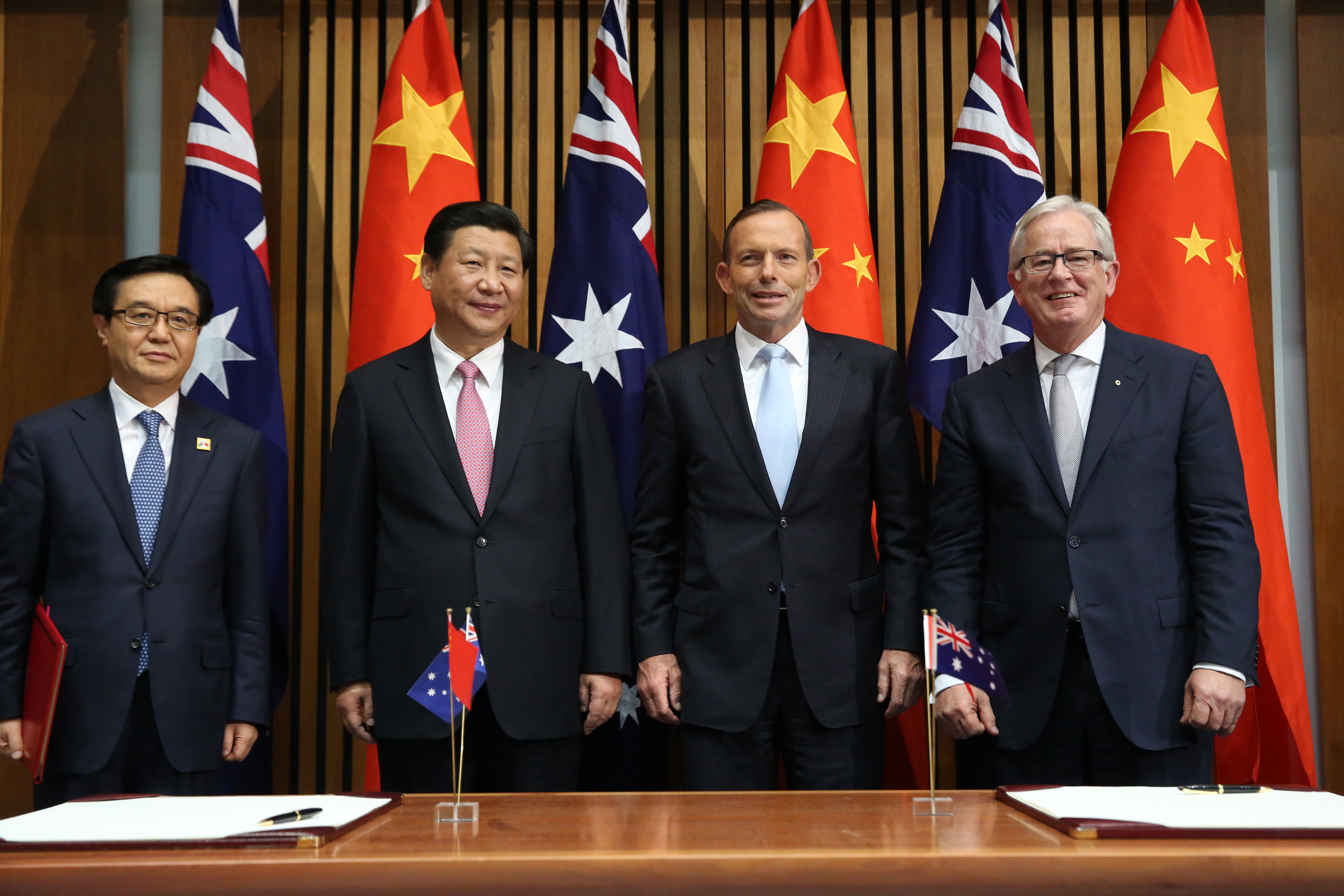
Abbott and Andrew Robb signing the Free Trade Agreement with president and Chinese Communist Party leader Xi Jinping, November 2014

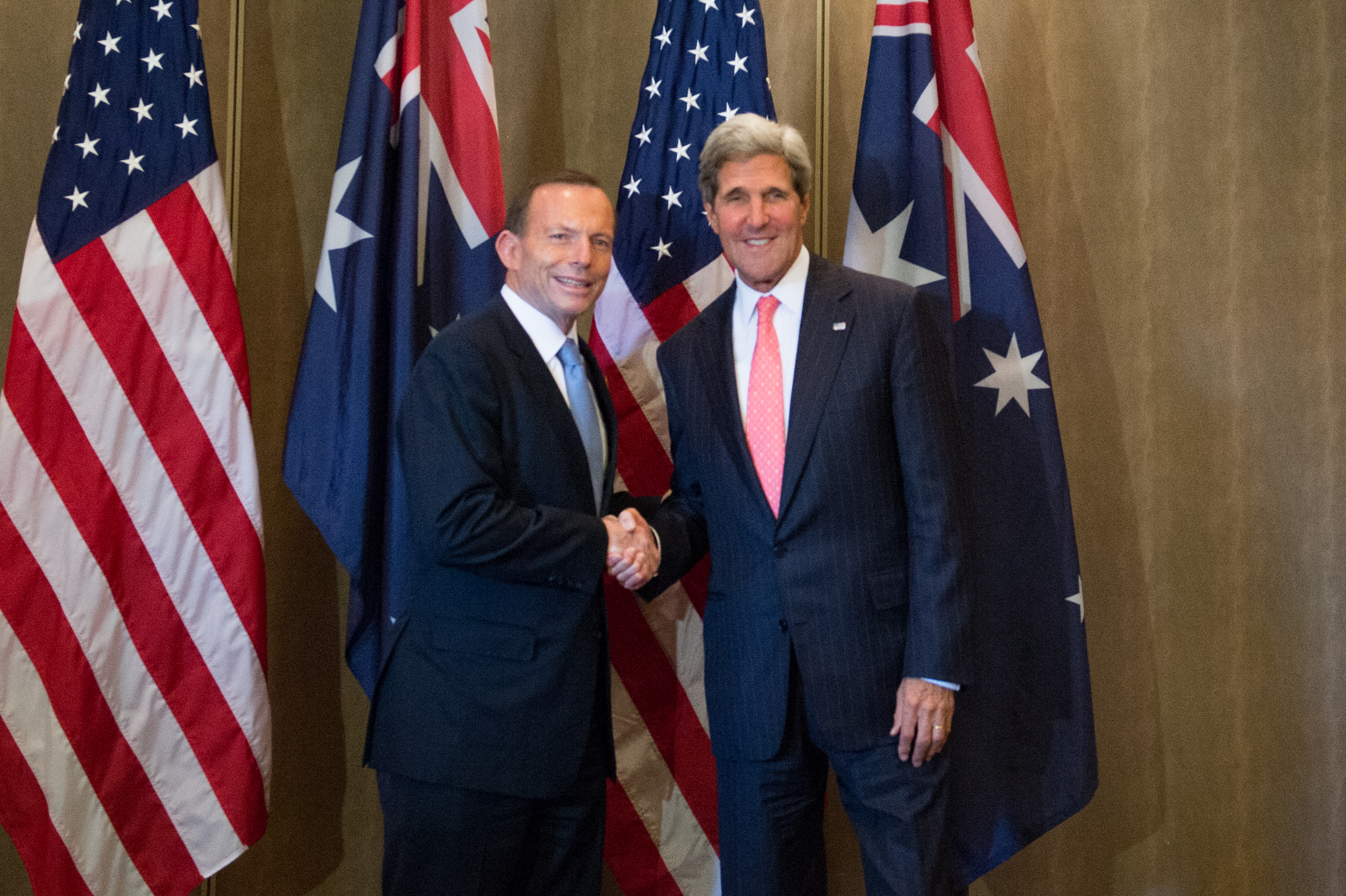
Abbott meeting with US Secretary of State John Kerry

=== 2014 budget ===
The 2014 Australian federal budget, the Abbott government's first budget, delivered by Treasurer Joe Hockey, was criticised by the Opposition as "cruel" and "unfair" and a large number of budget saving measures were blocked by the crossbench in the Senate. Hockey and Abbott were both criticised for their inability to "sell" the necessity of the budget cuts to the cross bench or the public. Hockey was further criticised for several "out of touch" and "insensitive" comments in subsequent months, however, the prime minister continuously publicly backed the treasurer, refusing to replace him with a better performing minister.

=== Knighting of Prince Philip ===
On 25 March 2014, Abbott announced that he had advised the Queen to reinstate the knight and dame system of honours to the Order of Australia. Outgoing governor-general Quentin Bryce and her successor, Peter Cosgrove, became the first recipients of the reinstated honours. On Australia Day 2015, Abbott announced that Prince Philip, Duke of Edinburgh, the Queen's husband and a resident of the United Kingdom, would be appointed a Knight of the Order of Australia. This decision was widely criticised, including by members of the government, and fuelled speculation that the prime minister's leadership could be challenged. Abbott described the decision as a "captain's call", later admitting that he "probably overdid it on awards". On 2 November 2015, new prime minister Malcolm Turnbull announced that knights and dames had been removed from the Order of Australia, as "not appropriate in our modern honours system", although existing titles would not be affected.

=== February 2015 leadership spill ===
On 6 February 2015, Liberal backbencher Luke Simpkins announced that he would move a motion, at a meeting of the party room, for a spill of the federal Liberal Party's leadership positions. Simpkins stated that such a motion would give Liberal members of parliament and senators the opportunity to either endorse the prime minister or "seek a new direction". The meeting was held on 9 February 2015 and the spill motion was defeated by 61 votes to 39. Both Malcolm Turnbull and deputy leader Julie Bishop were speculated to be considering a leadership run if the spill motion had succeeded. Prime Minister Abbott described the leadership motion as a "near death experience" and declared that "good government starts today", promising to consult his colleagues more, to shy away from his so-called "captain's calls" and to reduce the role of his chief of staff Peta Credlin.

=== Operations against Islamic State ===
Prime Minister Abbott announcing ADF operations against ISIL,10 March 2014

Following the Île-de-France attacks, the Kuwait mosque bombing and the mass shooting in Sousse, Tunisia, Abbott announced that "Isis is at war with Australia." Australia had already begun anti-terrorism measures against the group in 2014. However, by September, the Royal Australian Air Force was readying a wing of F/A-18E/F Super Hornets, along with an E-7A Wedgetail and KC-30, for operations in Eastern Syria, making strikes against Islamic State of Iraq and the Levant. The Australian commitment, known as Operation Okra involved 400 personnel, came at the formal request of President Barack Obama. Australian forces integrated with British Armed Forces, United States Armed Forces and other coalition members within Operation Inherent Resolve. It is understood that Australia's air operations were complemented by operations of the 4 Squadron of the Australian Special Air Service Regiment.

=== Choppergate ===
In July 2015, Bronwyn Bishop, who had been successfully nominated by Abbott in November 2013 for the position of Speaker of the House, came under intense media scrutiny after details of her use of taxpayer-funded political entitlements were made public, including chartering a helicopter flight between Melbourne and Geelong to attend a Liberal party fundraiser. Abbott was criticised over his handling of the entitlements scandal as he allowed the controversy to drag on for weeks because of his refusal to sack the speaker, a close friend and political mentor. Despite Abbott's support, Bishop resigned as Speaker on 2 August 2015.

=== Same-sex marriage debate ===
During Abbott's prime ministership, Australian law continued to define marriage as a union of a man and a woman, while recognising same-sex couples as de facto couples in areas such as taxation law, social security law, immigration and superannuation, and Abbott did not support changing the law. During Abbott's time as opposition leader and prime minister, the position of the Labor Party and opinion polls shifted towards favouring same-sex marriage. Abbott determined that a national plebiscite, rather than a Parliamentary vote should settle the issue.

As an Opposition front bencher in 2008, Abbott wrote: "The love and commitment between two people of the same sex can be as strong as that between husband and wife... There is more moral quality in a relationship between two people devoted to each other for decades than in many a short-lived marriage. Still, however deeply affectionate or long lasting it may be, the relationship between two people of the same sex cannot be a marriage because a marriage, by definition, is between a man and a woman... Let's celebrate all strong relationships, whether they are between a man and a woman or between people of the same sex but let's be careful about describing every lasting sexual bond as a 'marriage'." The First Rudd government and Gillard government held similar views (although the short-lived second Rudd government reversed Labor's position on the issue).

Abbott reaffirmed that he did not support changing the law to recognise same-sex marriage, and did not alter Coalition policy on the issue – however he permitted Coalition members to advocate for change if they felt strongly on the issue, and indicated that if a bill were to come before the new parliament, the Coalition party room would discuss its stance on the issue. Opinion polls suggested growing support for change. On 11 August 2015, after renewed debate about same-sex marriage in Australia, Abbott called a Coalition Party room vote and Coalition MPs voted against allowing a free vote on the issue 66 to 33. Some MPs said they were willing to cross the floor on the issue and Abbott was criticised by some pro-gay marriage Liberal MPs, including Christopher Pyne, for holding the vote in the Coalition party room, rather than the Liberal party room (as the inclusion of National Party votes decreased chances of a pro-change outcome). To settle the issue, Abbott proposed a plebiscite following the next election. Although he remained personally opposed to change, he said Parliament should respect the outcome of the national vote on the issue. A national plebiscite regarding same-sex marriage would eventually be held in 2017, under the subsequent Turnbull government.

=== September 2015 leadership spill ===
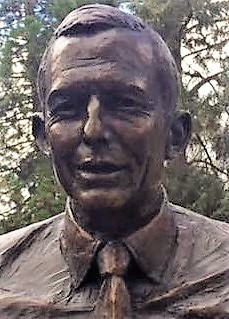
Bronze bust of Tony Abbott at the Prime Ministers Avenue in the Ballarat Botanical Gardens

On 14 September 2015, Malcolm Turnbull, the Minister for Communications, resigned and stated his intention to challenge the Liberal Party leadership in a leadership spill. A party-room meeting held that evening saw Abbott defeated by Turnbull on a 54–44 vote. According to The Economist, Abbott was ousted due to poor opinion polling, lacklustre economic management, and involvement in several political gaffes and scandals. In comments just after the result was announced, Turnbull praised Abbott for his "formidable achievements" as prime minister. By the time he was removed from premiership, Abbott was one of the most unpopular world leaders, and he has been regarded by critics and political experts as one of Australia's worst prime ministers.

== Later years in parliament (2015–2019) ==
After Malcolm Turnbull successfully challenged Abbott for the Liberal Party leadership in 2015, Abbott returned to the government backbench and pledged to remain in Parliament. In a final media conference as prime minister, Abbott told reporters: "Leadership changes are never easy for our country. My pledge today is to make this change as easy as I can. There will be no wrecking, no undermining, and no sniping. I've never leaked or backgrounded against anyone. And I certainly won't start now [...] I am proud of what the Abbott government has achieved. We stayed focused despite the white-anting [...] The nature of politics has changed in the past decade. A febrile media culture has developed that rewards treachery. If there's one piece of advice I can give to the media, it's this: refuse to print self-serving claims that the person making them won't put his or her name to. Refuse to connive at dishonour by acting as the assassin's knife."

=== Turnbull government ===
Malcolm Turnbull gave the former prime minister no portfolio in the new government. As a backbencher, he continued to defend the record of the Abbott government, and speak out on a range of issues. Following the November 2015 Paris attacks, he backed Egyptian president Abdel Fattah el-Sisi call for a "revolution in Islam" in a speech in Singapore, and told Sky News Australia, "All of those things that Islam has never had – a Reformation, an Enlightenment, a well-developed concept of the separation of church and state – that needs to happen." He defended the Abbott government's 2014 Budget measures and called on future prime ministers to follow his commitment to spending a week a year in indigenous communities. Abbott declared he would have won the 2016 Election. In a December 2015 editorial, The Sydney Morning Herald accused Abbott of contradicting his undertaking that there would be "no undermining of Malcolm Turnbull".

On 24 January 2016, Abbott confirmed that he would stand for Liberal preselection for the Division of Warringah in the federal election. He was re-elected with a small swing against him, matching the statewide swing against the government. Following his re-election, he voiced various concerns about the direction of the Turnbull government. In February 2017, he told a book launch that the Turnbull government was perceived by many conservatives as "Labor lite", and risked a "drift to defeat" at the upcoming election if it failed to improve its performance. Turnbull's ousting of Abbott had divided the Liberal Party rank and file and tensions continued in the parliamentary Party. Abbott said Turnbull supporters had plotted against him.

In the lead up to the 2017 postal survey on same sex marriage, Abbott campaigned for the retention of the status quo. During the campaign, Abbott was headbutted in Hobart by protester Astro Labe, who was sentenced to six months imprisonment. Following the "yes" vote in the plebiscite, Abbott said he accepted the result, and that the matter was settled.

In October 2015, The Australian reported that a "poll of 1631 voters shows 62 per cent of Australians believe the Liberal Party did the right thing" in ousting Abbott. Abbott was returned as the Member for Warringah at the subsequent election, but the Coalition's majority in the House of Representatives was reduced from 29 seats to one seat. In April 2018, the now-elected Turnbull government reached the 30-consecutive-Newspoll-losses benchmark Turnbull had used to unseat Abbott. Turnbull resigned after losing the support of the Party in room during the Liberal leadership spills of 2018. Abbott supported Peter Dutton in the leadership vote. Following the election of Scott Morrison as party leader, Abbott said the Coalition now had a better chance of re-election in the upcoming poll, telling the Centre for Independent Studies: "I am confident, given the ministerial appointments that he's made, that there will be better policy, there will be a united party, and there will be a sharper difference with our opponents."

=== Morrison government ===
Following Turnbull's resignation, Abbott was appointed as Prime Minister Scott Morrison's Special Envoy on Indigenous Affairs, with a brief to focus on indigenous school attendance and performance. Abbott presented his first report to Parliament as Special Envoy in December 2018. He recommended increasing substantially the salary supplements and the retention bonuses for teachers in very remote areas; waiving HECS debt of longer term teachers in very remote schools; incentives for communities to adopt debit card arrangements; an extension of the Remote School Attendance Strategy, with more local school buy-in and engagement; extension of Noel Pearson's Good to Great Schools program that has reintroduced phonics and disciplined learning for further evaluation and emulation; and that the government should match the Australian Indigenous Education Foundation's private and philanthropic funding on an ongoing basis.

In the 2019 federal election, Abbott lost his seat of Warringah to independent candidate and former Olympic skier Zali Steggall, marking the first time the seat had been lost by the Liberals and their predecessors since its creation in 1922. Abbott went into the election holding Warringah on a two-party-preferred margin of 61 points. But he lost more than 12 points of his primary vote from 2016, and finished over 4,100 votes behind Steggall on the first-preference count and over 13,000 after preferences were distributed – losing by 57.2% to 42.8%. Abbott had won the seat at nine elections and served 25 years as the Member for Warringah.

== Post-parliamentary career ==
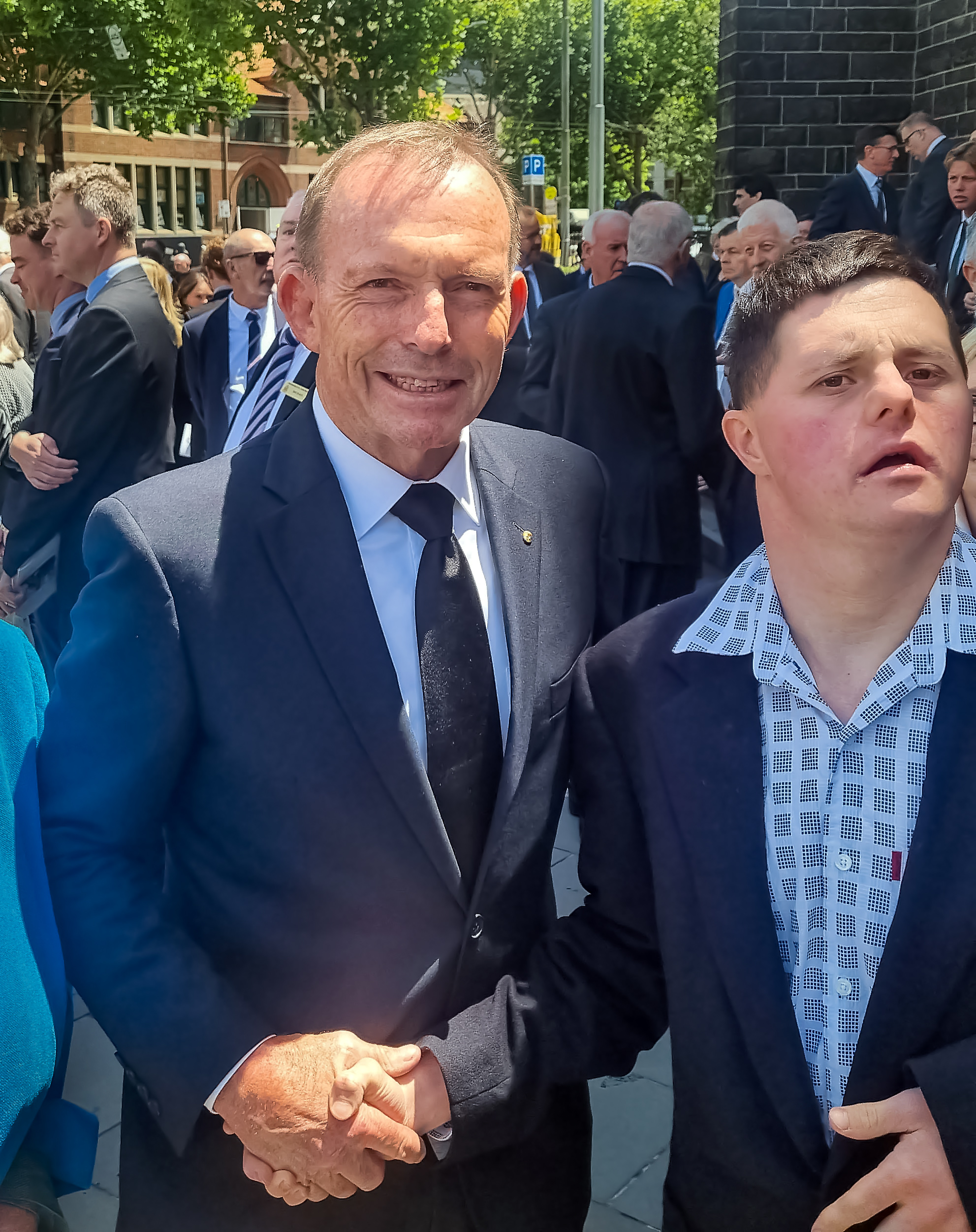
Abbott in 2024 with a man with Down syndrome

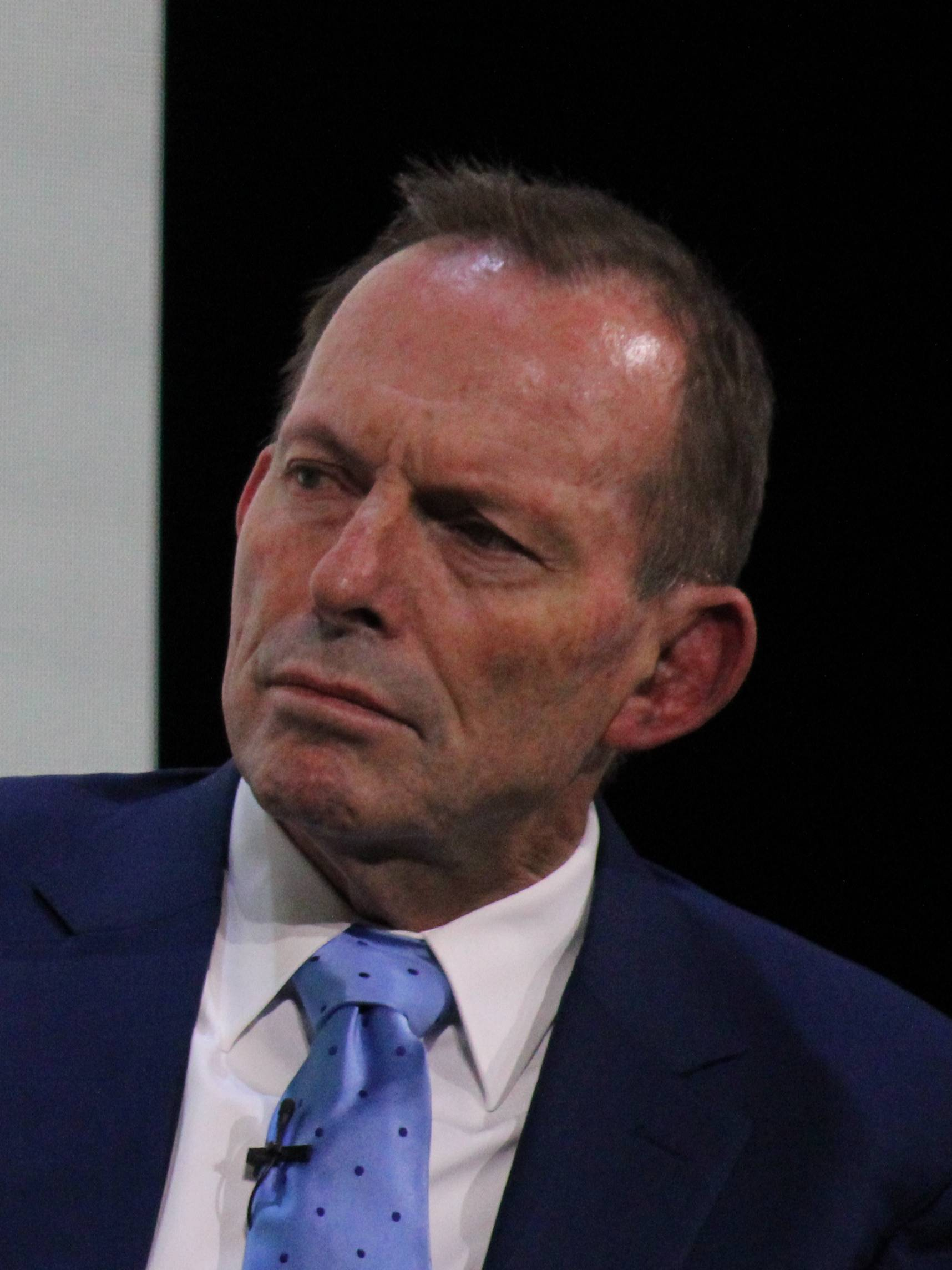
Abbott at the 2025 Alliance for Responsible Citizenship conference in London, England

Abbott has been on the board of the Ramsay Centre for Western Civilisation since 2016. In 2019 he was appointed to the board of the Australian War Memorial.

On 4 September 2020, Abbott was appointed as an adviser to the UK's Board of Trade with the stated aim of providing "a range of views to help in its advisory function, promoting free and fair trade and advising on UK trade policy to the International Trade Secretary". The role involves advising on the negotiation of international trade deals for the UK, but it was reported that Abbott would not be involved in advising the government on the country's Brexit process. He will be joined on the board by other senior political figures, including Patricia Hewitt, a former UK Secretary of State for Health, Daniel Hannan, a former Member of the European Parliament, and Linda Yueh, a writer and broadcaster. News of the appointment prompted UK Opposition politicians to question his suitability for the job because of comments previously made by Abbott about climate change, women and same-sex marriage. Boris Johnson, the UK's prime minister, said that he could not agree with the views of everyone in his government, but that Abbott had been elected as prime minister by that "great, liberal democratic nation of Australia" which he said "speaks for itself".

In 2024 Abbott declined to be interviewed for ABC's Nemesis television documentary, which told the story of the Abbott, Turnbull and Morrison governments. Abbott was the first former prime minister to decline an interview in the three decades that the ABC has made retrospective documentaries about Australian governments. When Cardinal Pell died in 2023 Abbott described him as a "saint for our times".

In 2025 Abbott was instrumental in encouraging Jacinta Price to run for the deputy leadership after the federal election, believing it would energise the party's base.

Following the 2026 split of the Liberal-National Coalition, Abbott has been encouraging members of the National Right faction to spill the leadership of the Liberal Party. A spill happened a month later.

=== Possible Senate appointment ===
After the death of Senator Jim Molan, former Victorian Liberal Party president Michael Kroger in an interview with Sky News Australia suggested the idea of Abbott taking Molan's Senate seat. Opposition Leader Peter Dutton told ABC News that there was ''no question Tony Abbott would be an asset" but also stated that "there will be many other candidates who are very credible as well". Ultimately, Abbott was not selected for the Senate vacancy.

=== Board appointments ===
In February 2023, Abbott joined the board of UK think-tank Global Warming Policy Foundation which is known for its climate change scepticism.

As of July 2023, he holds the role of a senior advisor at New Direction, a think tank affiliated with the European Conservatives and Reformists Party in the European Parliament.

In November 2023, Abbott was appointed to a board seat at Fox Corporation. His nomination came the day after Rupert Murdoch announced his retirement.

=== Liberal Party presidency ===
In May 2026, Abbott announced his intention to run to become Liberal Party president with the backing of Liberal leader Angus Taylor. Former leader Alexander Downer, who was expected to contest the presidency against Abott decided to run for one of the vice-president's positions, this left Abbott as the sole nominee for party president.

He was elected president unopposed on 29 May.

== Political views ==
Abbott is a member of the National Right faction of the Liberal Party.

The term "Abbottism" has been coined by several media outlets to refer to his political ideology. Abbottism has been compared to several other eponymous political ideologies, namely Hansonism (the views of Pauline Hanson) and Trumpism (the views of Donald Trump).

=== Aboriginal affairs ===
Abbott has an active interest in Indigenous affairs. As Opposition Leader, Abbott promised to prioritise Indigenous affairs. As prime minister, Abbott reformed the administration of the Indigenous affairs portfolio, moving it into the Department of Prime Minister.

As Health Minister, Abbott established the Nurse Family Partnership to improve conditions for indigenous youth. As Opposition Leader, he worked with Cape York Aboriginal activist Noel Pearson, volunteered as a teacher in remote Aboriginal Communities and gave a commitment to continue to live one week a year in such communities if elected prime minister. In contrast to his mentor John Howard, Abbott praised Rudd's National Apology to the Stolen Generation.

While the Coalition and Labor were engaged in negotiations with crossbenchers to obtain minority government in 2010, Noel Pearson lobbied Rob Oakeshott to back Abbott. Rising to support the passage of the Gillard government's historic Aboriginal and Torres Strait Islander Peoples Recognition Bill through the House of Representatives in 2013, Abbott said:

Australia is a blessed country. Our climate, our land, our people, our institutions rightly make us the envy of the earth, except for one thing—we have never fully made peace with the First Australians. This is the stain on our soul that Prime Minister Keating so movingly evoked at Redfern 21 years ago. We have to acknowledge that pre-1788 this land was as Aboriginal then as it is Australian now. Until we have acknowledged that we will be an incomplete nation and a torn people ... So our challenge is to do now in these times what should have been done 200 or 100 years ago to acknowledge Aboriginal people in our country's foundation document. In short, we need to atone for the omissions and for the hardness of heart of our forebears to enable us all to embrace the future as a united people.

In November 2012, Abbott flew to Alice Springs to back Aboriginal Country Liberal Party (CLP) MLA Alison Anderson to run in the federal seat of Lingiari and to become the first Indigenous woman to enter Parliament. Anderson eventually did not run as the CLP candidate for Lingiari in the 2013 federal election.

In August 2015, he rejected the request of Aboriginal leaders Patrick Dodson and Noel Pearson for the federal government to fund a series of Indigenous-only conventions on the wording for the referendum, citing concerns it could be potentially divisive.

Abbott opposed the Indigenous Voice to Parliament in the 2023 referendum, arguing it would divide Australians. Abbott served on the advisory board of Advance Australia, a conservative lobby group supporting the No campaign against the Voice.

=== Constitutional monarchy ===
Abbott supports the Australian monarchy. Before entering parliament, he worked as the executive director of Australians for Constitutional Monarchy from 1993 to 1994.

In March 2014, Abbott advised the Queen to reintroduce the grade of Knight/Dame to the Order of Australia, without discussing it in the Cabinet and despite stating in December 2013 that he did not plan to do so. The Fraser government initially introduced the grade of Knight/Dame of the Order of Australia in 1976; the Hawke government discontinued it in 1986.

=== Climate change ===
Before becoming opposition leader, Abbott initially supported proposals by Liberal leaders Howard and Turnbull to introduce floating prices to reduce carbon emissions, but also expressed some doubts as to the science and economics underlying such initiatives. In 2009, Abbott announced his opposition to Turnbull's support for the Rudd government's Emissions Trading Scheme proposal, and successfully challenged Turnbull for the Liberal leadership, chiefly over this issue. As Opposition Leader, Abbott declared that he accepted that climate change was real and that humans were having an impact on it, but rejected carbon pricing as a means to address the issue, proposing instead to match the Labor government's 5% emissions reduction target through implementation of a plan involving financial incentives for emissions reductions by industry, and support for carbon storage in soils and expanded forests. On the eve of the 2013 election, Abbott told the ABC:

[J]ust to make it clear... I think that climate change is real, humanity makes a contribution. It's important to take strong and effective action against it, and that is what our direct action policy does. ... The important thing is to take strong and effective action to tackle climate change, action that doesn't damage our economy. And that is why the incentive-based system that we've got, the direct action policies, which are quite similar to those that president Obama has put into practice, is – that's the smart way to deal with this, a big tax is a dumb way to deal with it.

— Abbott on ABC TV Insiders prior to 2013 election.

Before becoming opposition leader in November 2009, Abbott questioned the science of climate change and an ETS. In November 2009, Abbott outlined his objections to the Rudd government's carbon pricing plan on the ABC's Lateline program. Upon becoming Leader of the Opposition, Abbott put the question of support for the Government's Carbon Pollution Reduction Scheme (CPRS) to a secret ballot and the Liberal Party voted to reject the policy – overturning an undertaking by Turnbull to support an amended version of the government's scheme. Under Abbott, the Coalition joined the Greens and voted against the CPRS in the Senate, and the bill was defeated twice, providing a double dissolution trigger. The Rudd government eventually deferred its CPRS legislation until 2013.

With Abbott as opposition leader, the Liberal party opposed a carbon emissions tax and an Emissions Trading Scheme. Abbott predicted in March 2012 that the Gillard government's carbon tax would be the world's "biggest". A January 2013 OECD report on taxation of energy use measured Australia's effective tax rate on carbon at 1 July 2012 as among the lower rates in the OECD. In July 2011, Abbott criticised the proposed powers of the government's carbon tax regulator.

In October 2017, Abbott spoke in London at the Global Warming Policy Foundation, a climate-skeptic lobby group, where he described climate change as "probably doing good; or at least, more good than harm". He argued that higher concentrations of carbon dioxide act as "plant food" and "are actually greening the planet and helping to lift agricultural yields".

On 15 December 2019, he claimed that the world was "in the grip of a climate cult".

=== Social policy ===
Abbott opposed the legislation of same-sex marriage in Australia. Abbott is an opponent of embryonic stem cell research and euthanasia. He supports the right for women to have an abortion. As health minister in 2006, he tried, but failed, to block the introduction of the abortion pill RU-486, but said in 2010 he would not try to ban it. As health minister, Abbott advocated for reducing the number of abortions performed each year as a national priority, and referred to abortion as the "easy way out". Abbott opposed allowing the introduction of embryonic stem cell research or therapeutic cloning in a conscience vote.

In his 2009 book Battlelines, Abbott proposed that consideration should be given to a return to an optional at-fault divorce agreement between couples who would like it, similar to the Matrimonial Causes Act, which would require spouses to prove offences like adultery, habitual drunkenness, cruelty, desertion, or a five-year separation before a divorce would be granted. Abbott said that this would be a way of "providing additional recognition to what might be thought of as traditional marriage".

Early on in his prime ministership, the Australian Capital Territory Legislative Assembly passed the Marriage Equality (Same Sex) Act 2013, a bill to allow same-sex couples to legally marry. Abbott announced that the federal government would challenge this decision in the High Court. The case was heard on 3 December. Nine days later, on 12 December, the High Court gave judgement that the Same Sex Act would be dismantled as it clashed with the federal Marriage Act 1961. When the Marriage Amendment (Definition and Religious Freedoms) Act 2017, which posed the question of whether same-sex couples should be able to marry, was presented to members of parliament, Abbott abstained from voting. Ultimately, same-sex marriage was passed into law in December 2017.

Abbott supported Peter Dutton's call to give "special treatment" to white South African farmers seeking asylum.

=== National Broadband Network ===
Abbott was opposed to a majority Fibre to the home (FttH) National Broadband Network (NBN). In 2010, as Leader of the Opposition, Abbott stated that he would "ferociously" hold the Labor government to account over what he believed to be "a white elephant on a massive scale" and would "demolish" the NBN.

In 2010, Abbott argued that an LTE network could meet Australia's future broadband needs, with "a tower on every street corner".

In 2011, he called for the NBN to be scrapped entirely with funding diverted to assist with recovery efforts following the Queensland floods, stating "The National Broadband Network is a luxury that Australia cannot now afford. The one thing you don't do is redo your bathroom when your roof has just been blown off."

With Malcolm Turnbull as Shadow Minister for Communications and Broadband, the Liberal/National Coalition proposed an alternative — The Multi-Technology Mix (MTM), which heavily utilised Fibre to the Node (FttN) technology — in the lead up to the 2013 Australian federal election. Abbott said that if elected, all Australians would have access to a minimum broadband speed of 25 Mbit/s by the end of their first term of government. They promised download speeds between 25 and 100 Mbit/s by the end of 2016 and 50 to 100 Mbit/s by 2019, with the rollout completed by the end of 2019.

=== China and Taiwan ===
Abbott called the AUKUS (Australia, United Kingdom and United States) defence pact, which is directed at countering Chinese power in the Indo-Pacific region, "the biggest decision that any Australian government has made in decades" as "it indicates that we are going to stand shoulder to shoulder with the United States and the United Kingdom in meeting the great strategic challenge of our time, which obviously, is China". Abbott said that Australia would be safer as a result, and cited China's increasing naval firepower as a justification for the deal.

Abbott strongly supports the de jure recognition of Taiwan as an independent nation. In 2021, Abbott attended a regional forum hosted in Taipei and met with Taiwanese President Tsai Ing-wen. During a speech, he stated that he wants to help Taiwan end its isolation from global affairs and reaffirmed Australia's solidarity with the country amid increasing tensions with China. In the speech, he also referred to China as a "bully" and Chinese President Xi Jinping as "the new red emperor". Chinese officials highly criticised Abbott's visit and speech, although Prime Minister Scott Morrison and his government defended his visit.

== Personal life ==
In March 2020, an Australian computer security researcher obtained Abbott's passport number and personal phone number after Abbott posted a photo of his aeroplane boarding pass on Instagram. The researcher found a security flaw in the online check-in portal of the airline carrier Qantas, that divulged sensitive information given details printed on the pass.

In September 2021, during the second COVID-19 lockdown in Sydney, Abbott was fined $500 for not wearing a mask in breach of COVID-19 health orders.

=== Marriage and children ===
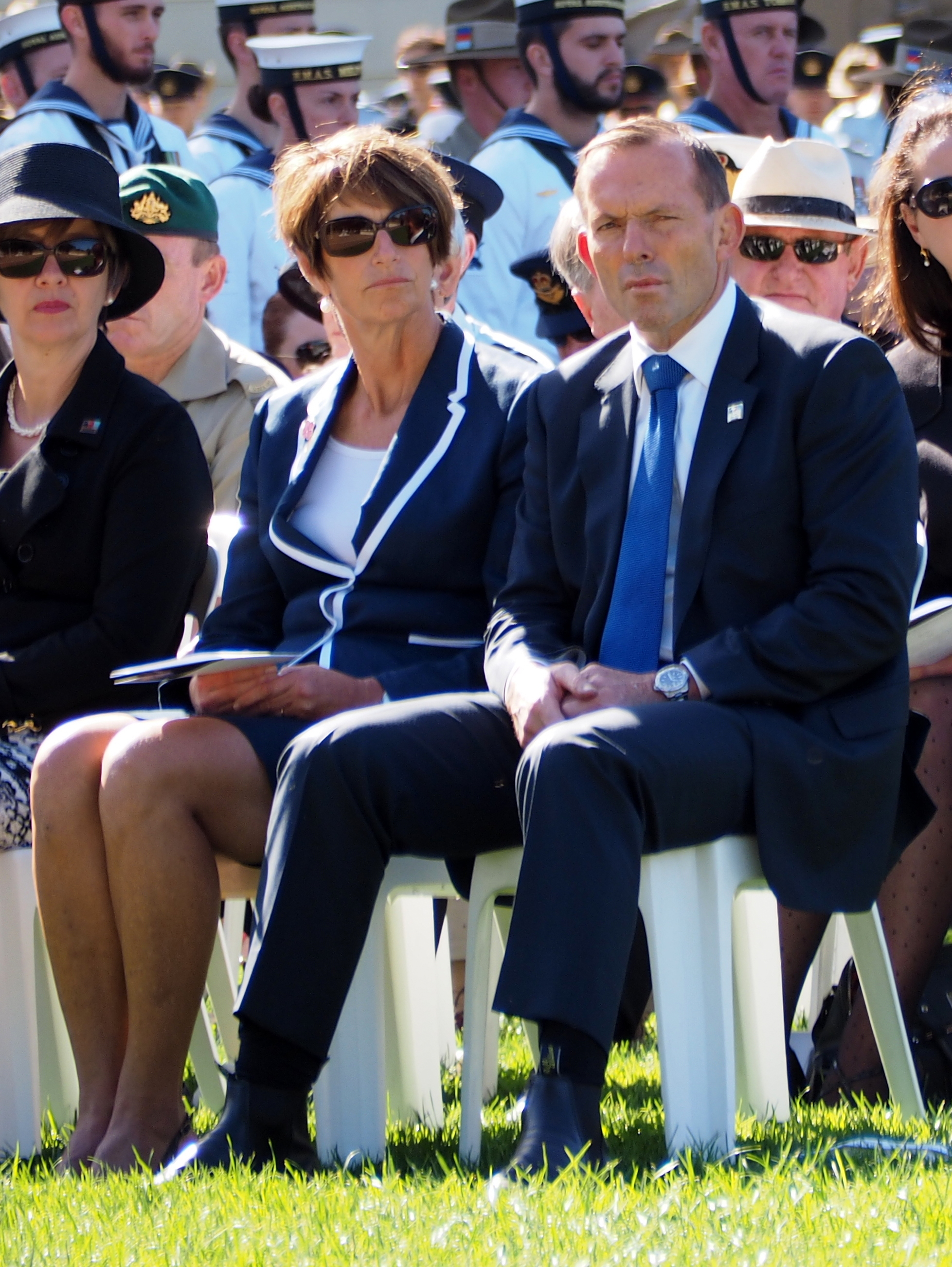
Margie and Tony Abbott at a Canberra event welcoming returning troops in 2015

When Abbott was 22, his girlfriend at the time became pregnant and claimed he was the biological father. The couple did not marry and put the child up for adoption. For 27 years, Abbott believed that he was the father of the child. In 2004, the man sought out Abbott, and it was publicly revealed he was an ABC sound recordist who worked in Parliament House, Canberra, and was involved in making television programmes in which Abbott appeared. The story was reported around the world, but DNA testing later revealed that Abbott was not the man's father.

Following his departure from the seminary, Abbott met and married Margaret "Margie" Aitken, a New Zealander working in Sydney. The couple have three daughters (Louise, Bridget and Frances), and became grandparents in 2021.

=== Religion ===
Abbott is a Roman Catholic. Before the 2013 Election, Abbott spoke of his religious outlook:

The Jesuits helped to instill in me this thought that our calling in life was to be ... 'a man for others' ... I am a pretty traditional Catholic... I'm not an evangelical, a charismatic Christian, I'm not. I try to attend Mass, but I don't get there every Sunday any more... Faith has certainly helped to shape my life, but it doesn't in any way determine my politics".

— Tony Abbott on ABC TV's Kitchen Cabinet; September 2013.

As a former Catholic seminarian, Abbott's religiosity has come to national attention and journalists have often sought his views on the role of religion in politics. According to John Warhurst of the Australian National University, academics have at times placed an "exaggerated concentration on the religious affiliation and personal religious background of just one of [the Howard government's] senior ministers, Tony Abbott". Journalist Michelle Grattan wrote in 2010 that while Abbott has always "worn his Catholicism on his sleeve", he is "clearly frustrated by the obsession with [it] and what might hang off that". Abbott has said that a politician should not rely on religion to justify a political point of view:

We are all influenced by a value system that we hold, but in the end, every decision that a politician makes is, or at least should, in our society be based on the normal sorts of considerations. It's got to be publicly justifiable; not only justifiable in accordance with a private view; a private belief.

— Abbott on ABC TV Four Corners, March 2010.

Various political positions supported by Abbott have been criticised by church representatives, including aspects of Coalition industrial relations, asylum seeker, and Aboriginal affairs policies. After criticisms of Liberal Party policy by clergy, Abbott has said, "The priesthood gives someone the power to consecrate bread and wine into the body and blood of Christ. It doesn't give someone the power to convert poor logic into good logic."

== Community service ==
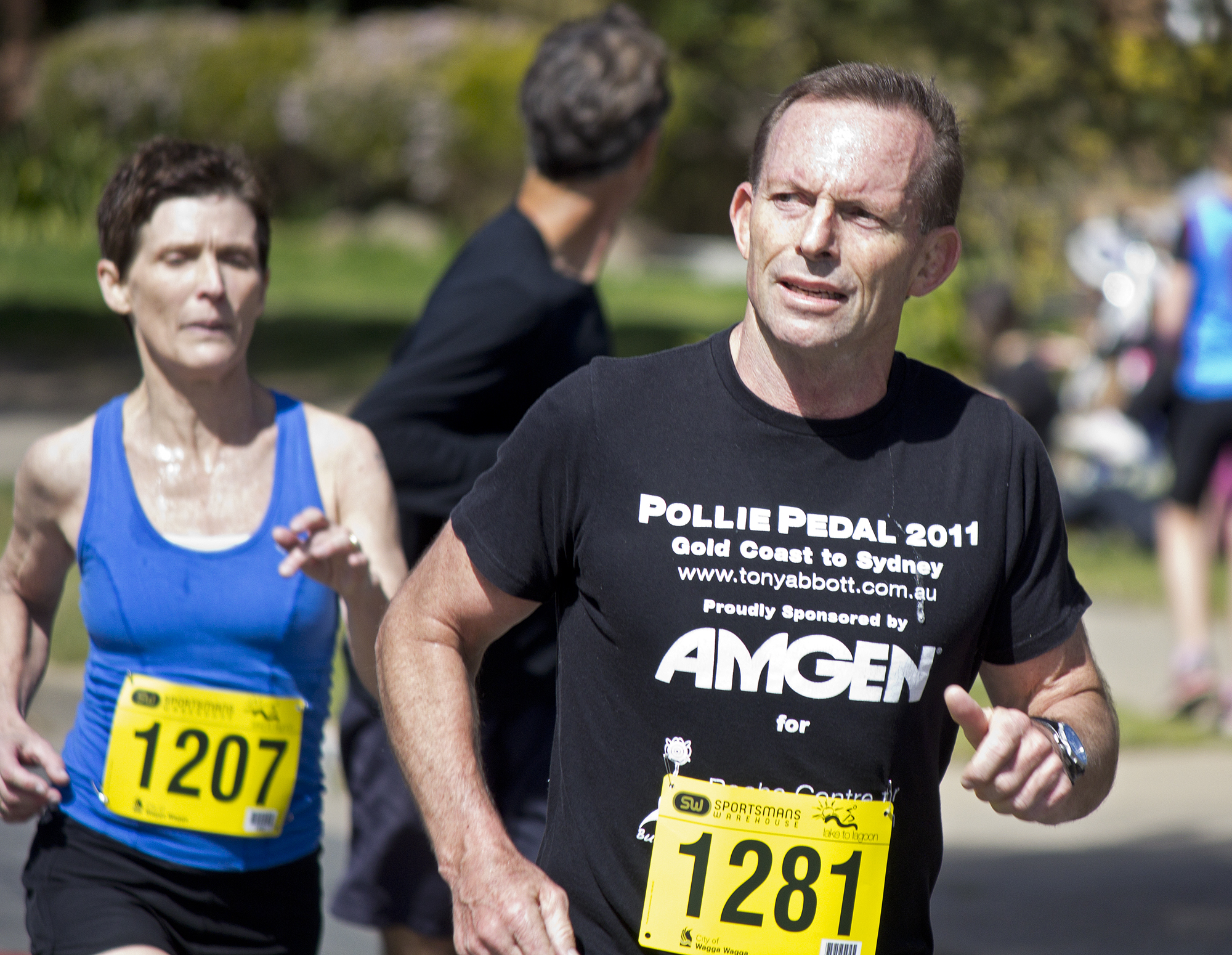
Tony Abbott competing in the Lake to Lagoon in Wagga Wagga

Abbott is an active volunteer member for the Davidson, NSW Rural Fire Service. He is also an active volunteer member of the Queenscliff Surf Life Saving Club.

Abbott participates in the Pollie Pedal, an annual 1,000 km charity bike ride. In April 2007, he launched the tenth annual Pollie Pedal, to raise money for breast cancer research.

In 2008, Abbott spent three weeks teaching in a remote Aboriginal settlement in Coen on Cape York, organised through Indigenous leader Noel Pearson. He taught remedial reading to Aboriginal children and worked with an income management group helping families manage their welfare payments. In 2009, he spent 10 days in Aurukun on Cape York working with the truancy team, visiting children who had not been attending school. Abbott's stated goal for these visits was to familiarise himself with Indigenous issues.

== Writings ==
Abbott has published five books. In 2009, he launched Battlelines; a personal biography, reflections on the Howard government and discussion of potential policy directions for the Liberal Party of Australia. Previously he had published two books in defence of the existing constitutional monarchy system, The Minimal Monarchy and How to Win the Constitutional War. In 2012, he released a compilation of key speeches from that year, entitled A Strong Australia. His 2025 book Australia – A History: How an ancient land became a great democracy featured a foreword by Geoffrey Blainey and was accompanied by a three-part documentary on Sky News Australia.

- Abbott, Tony (1995). The Minimal Monarchy: and why it still makes sense for Australia. Kent Town South Australia: Wakefield Press. ISBN 1-86254-358-5.
- — (1997). How to Win the Constitutional War: and give both sides what they want. Kent Town South Australia: Wakefield Press. ISBN 1-86254-433-6.
- — (2009). Battlelines. Carlton Victoria Australia: Melbourne University Press. ISBN 978-0-522-85606-4.
- — (2012). A Strong Australia. Liberal Party of Australia. ISBN 978-0-646-59033-2.
- — (2025). Australia – A History: How an ancient land became a great democracy. HarperCollins. ISBN 9781460768297.

== Honours ==
=== National ===
- (Australia) 1 January 2001: Centenary Medal, for service as Minister for Employment and Workplace Relations.
- 4 November 2018: National Medal (Australia), for 15 years service as a volunteer Firefighter.
- 7 June 2020: Companion of the Order of Australia (AC), For eminent service to the people and Parliament of Australia, particularly as prime minister, and through significant contributions to trade, border control, and to the Indigenous community.
- (Australia) 2025: National Emergency Medal

=== State medals ===
- New South Wales 8 March 2015: Rural Fire Service Long Service Medal, for ten years of long service

=== Foreign medals ===
- Japan 29 April 2022: Grand Cordon of the Order of the Rising Sun

== In popular culture ==
In January 2016, the Macquarie Dictionary announced that it had named "captain's call" its 2015 Word of the Year. The selection committee said 'captain's call' perfectly encapsulates what happened in Australia over the past year, after Mr Abbott's incessant use of it during his leadership in reference to making decisions without consulting colleagues.

== See also ==
- Abbott government
- 2014 Australian federal budget
- 2015 Australian federal budget

Non-profit organization positions
New office	Director of Australians for Constitutional Monarchy; 1992–1994	Succeeded by Kerry Jones
Parliament of Australia
Preceded by Michael MacKellar	Member for Warringah; 1994–2019	Succeeded by Zali Steggall
Political offices
Preceded by Warren Snowdon as Parliamentary Secretary to the Minister for Employment, Education and Training	Parliamentary Secretary to the Minister for Employment, Education, Training and Youth Affairs; 1996–1998	Succeeded by Mal Brough as Parliamentary Secretary to the Minister for Employment, Workplace Relations and Small Business
Preceded by Warren Snowdon as Parliamentary Secretary to the Minister for Employment, Education and Training	Parliamentary Secretary to the Minister for Employment, Education, Training and Youth Affairs; 1996–1998	Succeeded by Trish Worth as Parliamentary Secretary to the Minister for Education, Training and Youth Affairs
Preceded by Peter Baldwin as Minister for Higher Education and Employment Services	Minister for Employment Services; 1998–2001	Succeeded by Mal Brough
Preceded by Peter Reith	Minister for Employment, Workplace Relations and Small Business; 2001; With: Ian Macfarlane (as the Minister for Small Business in the outer cabinet)	Succeeded by Himself as Minister for Employment and Workplace Relations
Preceded by Peter Reith	Minister for Employment, Workplace Relations and Small Business; 2001; With: Ian Macfarlane (as the Minister for Small Business in the outer cabinet)	Succeeded by Joe Hockey as Minister for Small Business and Tourism
Preceded by Himself as Minister for Employment, Workplace Relations and Small Business	Minister for Employment and Workplace Relations; 2001–2003	Succeeded by Kevin Andrews
Preceded by David Kemp	Minister Assisting the Prime Minister for the Public Service; 2001–2003	Succeeded by Kevin Andrews
Preceded by Kay Patterson	Minister for Health and Ageing; 2003–2007	Succeeded by Nicola Roxon
Preceded by Jenny Macklin as Shadow Minister for Families and Community Services and Shadow Minister for Indigenous Affairs and Reconciliation	Shadow Minister for Families, Community Services, Indigenous Affairs and the Voluntary Sector; 2007–2008	Succeeded by Himself as Shadow Minister for Families, Housing, Community Services and Indigenous Affairs
Preceded by Jenny Macklin as Shadow Minister for Families and Community Services and Shadow Minister for Indigenous Affairs and Reconciliation	Shadow Minister for Families, Community Services, Indigenous Affairs and the Voluntary Sector; 2007–2008	Succeeded by Mitch Fifield as Shadow Minister for Disabilities, Carers and the Voluntary Sector
Preceded by Himself as Shadow Minister for Families, Community Services, Indigenous Affairs and the Voluntary Sector	Shadow Minister for Families, Housing, Community Services and Indigenous Affairs; 2008–2009	Succeeded by Kevin Andrews as Shadow Minister for Families, Housing and Human Services
Preceded by Sussan Ley as Shadow Minister for Housing	Shadow Minister for Families, Housing, Community Services and Indigenous Affairs; 2008–2009	Succeeded by Kevin Andrews as Shadow Minister for Families, Housing and Human Services
Preceded by Malcolm Turnbull	Leader of the Opposition of Australia; 2009–2013	Succeeded by Chris Bowen as Acting Leader of the Opposition of Australia
Preceded by Kevin Rudd	Prime Minister of Australia; 2013–2015	Succeeded by Malcolm Turnbull
Party political offices
Preceded by Malcolm Turnbull	Leader of the Liberal Party of Australia; 2009–2015	Succeeded by Malcolm Turnbull
Diplomatic posts
Preceded by Kevin Rudd	Chairperson of the Commonwealth of Nations; 2013	Succeeded by Mahinda Rajapaksa
Preceded by Vladimir Putin	Chairperson of the G20; 2014	Succeeded by Recep Tayyip Erdoğan
