= Australia: A History =

2025 book by Tony Abbott

- Author: Tony Abbott
- Subject: History of Australia
- Publisher: HarperCollins
- Publication date: 13 October 2025
- Pages: 448
- Award: 2026 Indie Book Awards longlist
- ISBN: 978-1-460-76829-7
- Website: Australia: A History at HarperCollins

Australia: A History is a 2025 book about the history of Australia by former Australian prime minister Tony Abbott. Abbott wrote the book aiming to show that Australia's history was "far more good than bad". The book received a mixed critical reception.

== Content ==
The book covers the history of Australia from the establishment of a penal colony in 1788 to the Voice to Parliament referendum in 2023. It chronicles Australia's journey to becoming an egalitarian democracy with widespread opportunity and a lack of class structure. Abbott also cites policies that have given Australians a "fair go" if they are prepared to "have a go", these include, tariff protection, compulsory arbitration and a living wage.

== Related documentary ==
A three-part documentary series based on the book was broadcast on Sky News Australia from 13–15 October 2025.

== Reception ==
Writing for The Conversation, Jane Lydon said "Abbott's Australia is narrowly conceived, excluding the perspectives of non-British cultures, women, and especially First Nations people." but also praised the book for having "a very readable synthesis of mainstream historical research".

Writing for Guardian Australia, Frank Bongiorno said there were "places where he has done a very good job" on the book and criticised the book for being too opinionated on other aspects such as the governments following his own, and the governments of Kevin Rudd and Julia Gillard.

Writing for the Australian Academy of the Humanities, Marilyn Lake said the book does not focus enough on women's issues and of other minorities.

== Awards ==
- 2026, Indie Book Awards, longlisted
