= Kerry Jones =

Australian monarchist (born 1956)

Kerry Lyn Jones (born 19 April 1956) is the current executive director of the Constitution Education Fund Australia (CEFA).

Following a Bachelor of Music in 1977 and a Diploma of Education in 1978, Jones taught music in Sydney high schools. In 1985 she was appointed by the NSW Education Department as Performing Arts Consultant (K-12) for the Riverina Region. Her work included teacher training and syllabus implementation, bi-centenary and other special music projects such as regional bands and choirs, and special arts projects including working with indigenous Australians on the far west border of NSW. She later completed a Master of Educational Administration.

From 1990 to 1993, Jones was chief executive officer of the National Association of Nursing Homes and Private Hospitals.

In 1994 Jones was appointed executive director of Australians for Constitutional Monarchy following The Hon. Tony Abbott stepping down from the post, due to being elected to the Federal Parliament. In 1998 she was elected as a member of the Australian Constitutional Convention 1998. As leader of ACM, she defended the Australian Constitution, saying "no republic model will ever offer the protection and safeguards that work so well in our current Constitution". She said her task was to "assess each republican model against the Constitution that has served us so well". She told the convention:

I [became] a constitutional monarchist—not out of my love of English blood, for my blood is actually Irish; not out of birth in the Protestant establishment, for I am actually a Catholic; not out of enthusiasm for all things royal, for I have little interest in such trivia. I had become a constitutional monarchist because I was persuaded, as was Michael Kirby, that the system of government bequeathed to us by our founders is superior to any republican models proposed.

In 1999 she was appointed by the Federal Government to chair the “No Case Committee” for the 1999 Australian republic referendum, ultimately leading the “No Case” to a successful result. By leading the campaign against a Republic, Jones became a public figure and was awarded a Centenary Medal in 2000.

In 2001 Jones was appointed executive director of the Constitution Education Fund Australia (CEFA). Devoted to nonpartisan Civics, Citizenship and Values Education Programs, Projects and Awards the CEFA charity empowers young Australians to become knowledgeable, responsible and engaged participants in the Australian community. Kerry sees her community work with CEFA as vital for the future of an informed and vibrant Australian democracy. Kerry now devotes her full-time work to this community cause and sees her primary life work as an educationalist.

Jones is the publisher and editor of Aboriginal Arts in Transition (1989), The No Case Papers (1999), The Australian Constitutional Monarchy (1994), The ACM Handbook (1996) and The People's Protest (2000).

Professional and academic associations
Preceded by Tony Abbott	Executive-Director for Australians for Constitutional Monarchy; 1994 – 2007	Succeeded by Thomas Flynn
