= List of acts of the Parliament of South Australia =

This is an incomplete list of acts of the Parliament of South Australia.

== 19th century ==
=== 1830-1839 ===
- List of acts of the Parliament of South Australia from 1837
- List of acts of the Parliament of South Australia from 1838
- List of acts of the Parliament of South Australia from 1839

=== 1840-1849 ===
- List of acts of the Parliament of South Australia from 1840
- List of acts of the Parliament of South Australia from 1841
- List of acts of the Parliament of South Australia from 1842
- List of acts of the Parliament of South Australia from 1843
- List of acts of the Parliament of South Australia from 1844
- List of acts of the Parliament of South Australia from 1845
- List of acts of the Parliament of South Australia from 1846
- List of acts of the Parliament of South Australia from 1847
- List of acts of the Parliament of South Australia from 1848
- List of acts of the Parliament of South Australia from 1849

== See also ==
- Legislative Council of South Australia
- Parliament of South Australia
