= Parliament of South Australia =

Legislature of the state of South Australia

Coordinates: 34°55′16″S 138°35′55″E

- 56th Parliament
- Coat of Arms of South Australia

- Parliament of South Australia logo

Type
- Type: Bicameral
- Houses: Legislative Council; House of Assembly
- Sovereign: Governor of South Australia (the representative of the King) (Note: Unlike most of the other states, the governor of South Australia is directly vested with legislative power, instead of merely acting in the King's name.)

History
- Founded: 22 April 1857; 169 years ago

Leadership
- Governor: Frances Adamson since 7 October 2021
- Speaker of the House of Assembly: Nat Cook, Independent since 5 May 2026
- President of the Legislative Council: Reggie Martin, Labor since 5 May 2026
- Premier: Peter Malinauskas, Labor since 21 March 2022
- Leader of the Opposition: Ashton Hurn, Liberal since 8 December 2025

Structure
- Seats: 69; 47 MPs; 22 MLCs
- House of Assembly political groups: Government (33): Labor (33); Opposition (5): Liberal (5); Crossbench (9): One Nation (4); Independent (4) (Note: Current independent MPs: Geoff Brock (Stuart), Matt Schultz (Kavel), Travis Fatchen (Mount Gambier) and Lou Nicholson (Finniss).); Speaker (1) (Note: Under the provisions of the Constitution (Independent Speaker) Amendment Act 2021 (SA), the Speaker is constitutionally banned from being a member of a registered political party outside of a "relevant election period". The current speaker, Nat Cook, was elected as a Labor Party candidate.)
- Legislative Council political groups: Government (10): Labor (10); Opposition (6): Liberal (6); Crossbench (6): One Nation (3); Greens (2); Family First (1)
- Length of term: House: 4 years Council: 8 years
- Salary: $217,773 (2025); ($197,270 MP Base; + $20,503 Common Allowance)

Elections
- House of Assembly voting system: Full preferential voting
- Legislative Council voting system: Single transferable vote
- First general election: 21 February 1851 as unicameral Legislative Council; 9 March 1857 as bicameral parliament
- Last general election: 21 March 2026
- Redistricting: Redistributions are carried out after each election by the South Australian Electoral Districts Boundaries Commission.

Meeting place
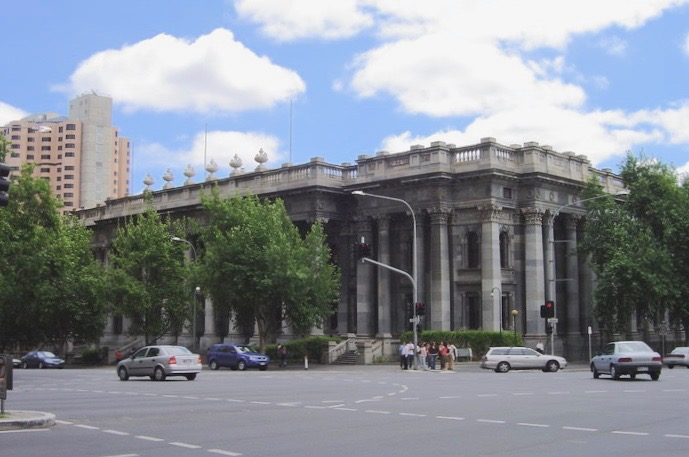
- Parliament House, Adelaide, South Australia, Australia

Website
- parliament.sa.gov.au

Constitution
- Constitution of South Australia

The Parliament of South Australia is the bicameral legislature of the Australian state of South Australia. It consists of the 47-seat House of Assembly (lower house) and the 22-seat Legislative Council (upper house). General elections are held every 4 years, with all of the lower house and half of the upper house filled at each election. It follows a Westminster system of parliamentary government with the executive branch required to both sit in parliament and hold the confidence of the House of Assembly. The parliament is based at Parliament House on North Terrace in the state capital of Adelaide.

Unlike the federal parliament and the parliaments of most other states, the South Australian Constitution does not define the parliament as including either the monarch or the governor of South Australia as one of its constituent parts. However, the constitution also vests legislative power in the state's governor acting with the advice and consent of both houses of parliament, making the role of the governor effectively the same as those of the other states.

The parliament may make laws for any matter within South Australia, subject to the Constitution of South Australia. Its power is further limited by the ability for the federal parliament to override it in some circumstances, subject to the Constitution of Australia. Similarly, the Supreme Court of South Australia, and ultimately the High Court of Australia, provides judicial oversight of parliament. The parliament is also vested with other powers, such as the means to investigate matters, conduct research and summon witnesses.

== History ==
=== Early colonial period and establishment ===
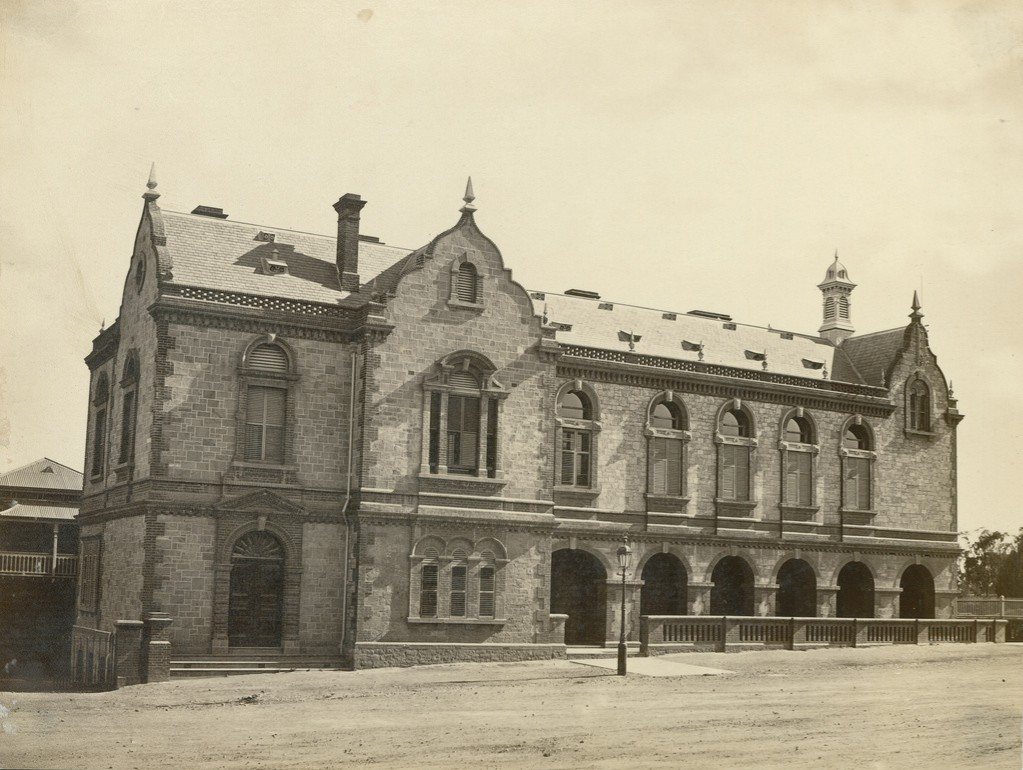
Old Parliament House in 1872

At the founding of the Province of South Australia under the South Australia Act 1834, governance of the new colony was divided between the Governor of South Australia and a Resident Commissioner, who reported to a new body known as the South Australian Colonization Commission. Under this arrangement, there was also a governing Council comprising the Governor, the Judge or Chief Justice, the Colonial Secretary, the Advocate-General and the Resident Commissioner, with broad legislative and executive powers including the imposition of rates, duties, and taxes. This council was sometimes referred to as the "Legislative Council". Confusion and dispute about the division of power between the two roles led to the South Australia Government Act 1838, which combined the role of Resident Commissioner with that of the Governor.

In 1842, the South Australia Act 1842 was passed in order to replace the South Australian Colonisation Commission appointed in 1834 with a more standard British model of government, with a Governor advised by a Legislative Council. The 1842 Act gave the British Government, which was responsible for appointing a Governor and at least seven other officers to the Legislative Council, full control of South Australia as a Crown Colony, after financial mismanagement by the first administration had nearly bankrupted the colony. This new Legislative Council was the first true parliamentary body in South Australia. The Act also made provision for a commission to initiate the establishment of democratic government, electoral districts, requirements for voting rights, and terms of office. Although the old governing Council advising the Governor met at Government House, this new Legislative Council met at a new purpose built chamber on North Terrace. This chamber eventually grew into what is now known as "Old Parliament House".

The Australian Colonies Government Act 1850 was a landmark development which granted representative constitutions to New South Wales, Victoria, South Australia and Tasmania and the colonies enthusiastically set about writing constitutions which produced democratically progressive parliaments with the British monarch as the symbolic head of state. In 1851 elections for the Legislative Council were held. The new Council consisted of 24 members, four official (filling what would be today ministerial positions) and four non-official members, both nominated by the governor on behalf of the Crown, and 16 elected members chosen from single-member districts. The right to vote for these positions was not universal, however, being limited to propertied men. In addition, the reforms meant that the Governor no longer oversaw proceedings, with the role being filled by a Speaker who had been elected by the members.

In 1853 the Legislative Council sent London a Parliament Act 1853 that provided for a new constitution that established a bicameral parliament with an elected lower house and an upper house made up of members nominated for life. The colonists were mistakenly under the impression that only such a scheme would be acceptable to the British Government. The Governor, Sir Henry Young, had been advised that this was not the case but he kept this information to himself. The colonists were furious and 5,000 petitioned Westminster to give them two elected houses. The offending constitution was returned and in 1855, a new Legislative Council was elected with a mandate to establish something far more radical and democratic than had been seen in the British Empire before.

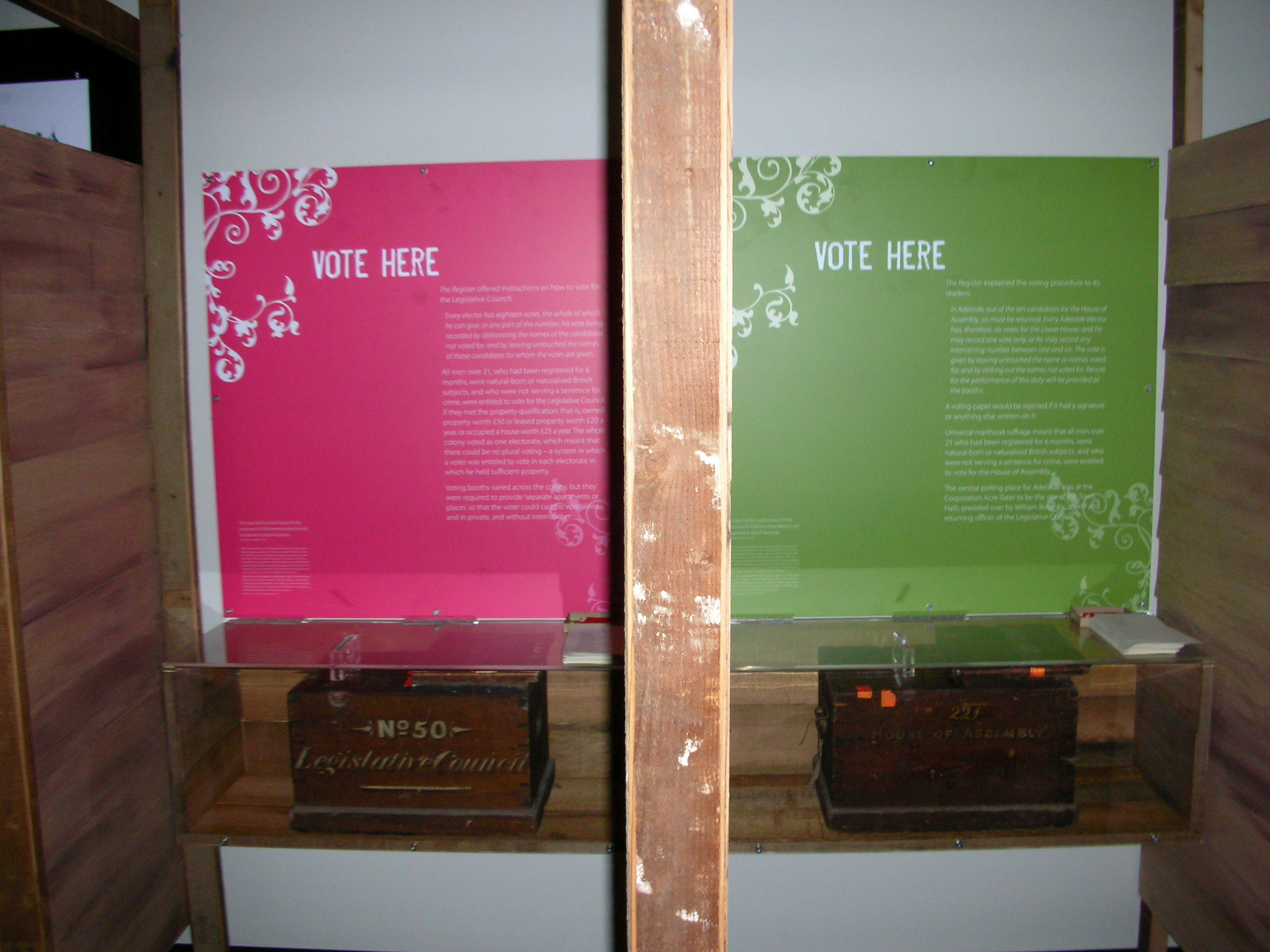
Recreated lower and upper house booths, history, and voting procedures

This was expressed by the Constitution Act 1856 (headed "1855–6: No. 2" and followed by the long title "An Act to establish a Constitution for South Australia, and to grant a Civil List to Her Majesty") establishing the constitution of the Parliament of the Province of South Australia.

=== Responsible government ===
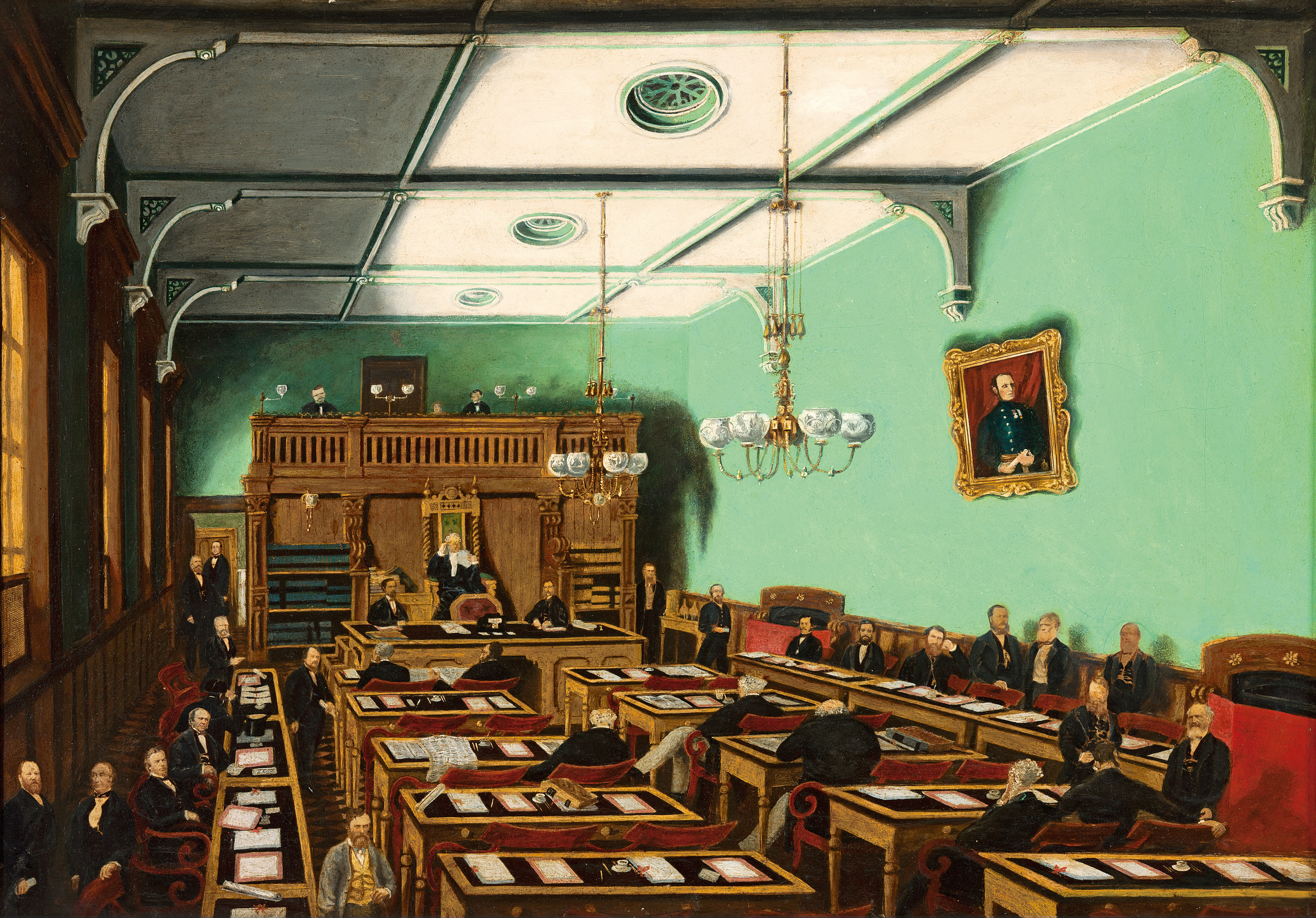
A painting of the House of Assembly meeting in Old Parliament House in 1867

This Constitution Act provided for a bicameral parliament with full authority to enact laws, apart from a few Acts requiring the monarch's personal Royal Assent. The 18-member Legislative Council was elected by property owners only, while the 36-member House of Assembly was elected by a full male franchise. The Act also provided for a system of responsible government, where the members of the executive branch must sit in parliament and, by convention, can only remain in office while they hold the confidence of a majority of the members of the House of Assembly. It was the first Constitution in the Australian colonies to provide "manhood" suffrage. The adoption of the "one man, one vote" principle also removed the ability of voters to vote in any electorate in which they owned property. The Act also defined the rules of tenure for the parliamentarians.

Later in 1856, in preparation for responsible government, the old Legislative Council passed an Electoral Act providing for the secret ballot system of voting to be used for the new parliament, also known as the Australian Ballot.

The first bicameral parliament of South Australia was elected on 9 March 1857, with Boyle Travers Finniss as the inaugural Premier of South Australia responsible to parliament. The parliament first sat on 22 April 1857.

Until 1887, membership of parliament was an unpaid position as members were expected to be able to support themselves through other means. This changed with the passage of the Payment of Members Act 1887 that set an annual salary of 200 pounds for members of both Houses who were not ministers. This rate has subsequently continued to evolve with the rate now set by an independent remuneration tribunal.

In 1889, the House of Assembly moved out of the original Parliament House and took up residence in a new building constructed next door. Due to costs, this "New Parliament House" would remain unfinished for 50 years while the Legislative Council continued to be housed in the original Parliament House.

Women gained the right to vote and stand for election in 1895, taking effect at the 1896 election. Once passed, South Australia become the fourth state in the world to give women the vote and the first to give women the right to be elected to parliament.

=== After federation ===
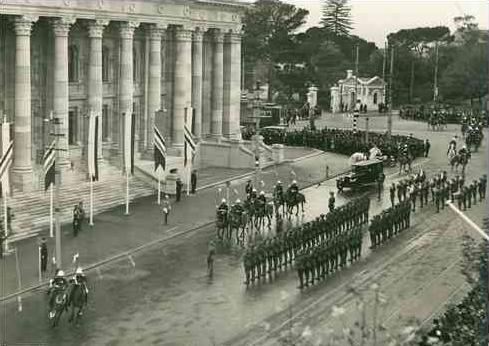
The completed New Parliament House being opened in 1939

South Australia became a state of the Commonwealth of Australia in 1901, following a vote to federate with the other British colonies of Australia. One consequence of federation was that the powers of the Parliament of South Australia were limited by the provisions of the Constitution of Australia, with some powers transferred to the federal parliament. Another consequence was a bit of a "brain drain", with many of the parliament's most prominent members moving to the federal sphere.

From 1857 to 1933, the House of Assembly was elected from multi-member districts, commonly known as "seats," with each district returning between one and six members. The size of the Assembly grew during the colonial period—36 members from 1857 to 1875, 46 members from 1875 to 1884, 52 members from 1884 to 1890, 54 members from 1890 to 1902.

In response to the Federation of Australia, the House of Assembly was reduced to 42 members from 1902 to 1912 and 40 members from 1912 to 1915 after the Northern Territory was ceded to federal administration. From 1915 to 1938 the size was again increased to 46 members.

The Legislative Council half of the "New Parliament House" was finally completed in 1939, 50 years after the House of Assembly portion of the building.

=== Playmander years ===
A map of South Australian electorates 1955–69, during the height of the Playmander

One distinctive aspect of the history of the South Australian parliament was the "Playmander", a pro-rural electoral malapportionment introduced by the incumbent Liberal and Country League (LCL) government, and in place for 32 years from 1936 to 1968. The already entrenched rural overweighting was increased to a 2:1 ratio, the number of MPs was reduced to 39 and the multi-member seats were abandoned for single-member seats. The House of Assembly now consisted of 26 low-population rural seats, which due to population shifts, were holding up to a 10-to-1 advantage over the 13 high-population metropolitan seats, even though rural seats contained only a third of South Australia's population. At the peak of the malapportionment in 1968, the rural seat of Frome had 4,500 formal votes, while the metropolitan seat of Enfield had 42,000 formal votes.

Labor managed to win enough parliamentary seats to form government just once during the Playmander against the odds − in 1965. Labor won comprehensive majorities of the statewide two-party vote whilst failing to form government in 1944, 1953, 1962 and 1968.

More equitable boundaries were subsequently put in place following the 1968 (with the House increased to 47 members), 1975, and 1989 elections. Since 1975, the distribution of the 47 electoral boundaries has been set by the South Australian Electoral Districts Boundaries Commission, an independent body. Since a referendum in 1991, boundaries have been redistributed after each election. Previously they were redistributed after every third election. There are currently 34 in the Adelaide metropolitan area and 13 in rural areas. These seats are intended to represent approximately the same population in each electorate.

=== Evolution of the Legislative Council ===
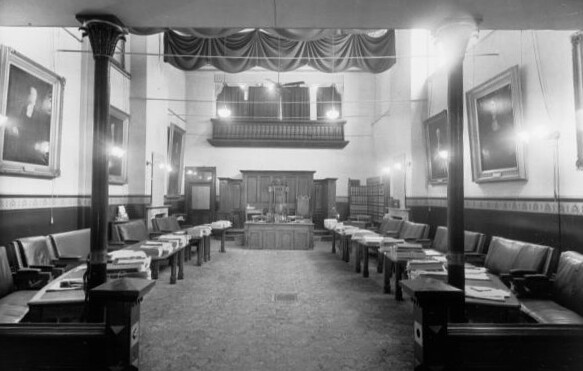
The Legislative Council chamber in Old Parliament House circa 1939

The Legislative Council's numbers and electoral makeup have also varied over time. From the inception of responsible government to 1882, it had 18 members elected by a single colony-wide district, with the scheme originally set up so that 6 members would be elected every 4 years to serve a 12 year term. In 1882, the single colony-wide district was split into 4 electoral districts which were drawn with a heavy bias in favour of rural areas in place. The new scheme was set up so that half of the Council was being elected each election. Originally these electoral districts were the "Central District", the "Southern District", the "North-Eastern District" and the "Northern District", with each being represented by 6 members each. From 1902, the Central District continued to be represented by 6 members, while the rural districts were reduced to 4 members each. The North-Eastern District was replaced by the "Midland District" from the 1910 election and in 1915 the Central District was split in half and became the "Central District No. 1" and the "Central District No. 2", each being represented by 4 members.

As for the size of the Council as a whole, from 1882 until 1902 it had 24 members; until 1915, 18 members; and until 1975, 20 members.

From 1975, the Council size was increased to 22 members, with half (11) to be elected at each election by the entire state voting as one electorate.

Although the lower house had universal suffrage from 1895, the upper house, the Legislative Council, remained the domain of property owners until the Labor government of Don Dunstan managed to achieve reform of the chamber in 1973.

Under the original 1856 Constitution, the franchise was restricted to men, "having a freehold estate in possession, either legal or equitable, situate within the said Province, of the clear value of Fifty Pounds sterling money above all charges and encumbrances affecting the same, or having a leasehold estate in possession, situate within the said Province, the lease thereof having been registered in the General Registry Office, for the registration of deeds, and having three years to run at the time of voting, or containing a clause authorising the lessee to become the purchaser of the land thereby demised, or occupy a dwelling house of the clear annual value of Twenty-five Pounds sterling money."

In 1907, the right to vote was extended to any person occupying a dwelling house, or "dwelling house and premises appurtenant thereto", with an annual rent of at least 17 pounds per annum (excluding any payment of rent by a wife to her husband); to a registered proprietor of a leasehold on which there were improvements to the value of at least 50 pounds and which were the property of the proprietor. At the same time, the franchise was also extended to ministers of religion, school head teachers, postmasters, railway stationmasters, and the officer in charge of a police station.

A further extension of the franchise came in 1913, when the qualification of an occupier of a dwelling house was altered to include any inhabitant occupier, whether owner or tenant.

In 1918, the right to vote for members of the upper house was extended to all those who had served in armed forced in the First World War. This was subsequently extended to Second World War veterans in 1940 and in 1969, it was simplified to apply to all Australian war veterans regardless of the war they served in.

In 1969, the franchise was granted to any person who owned or rented property, regardless of the value of the property. Further, the franchise was extended to the wedded spouse of the owner or renter.

Finally in 1973, all property qualifications were removed and the Council became a body elected via proportional representation by a single state-wide electorate from the same universal franchise as the House of Assembly. Since the following 1975 South Australian state election, no one party has had control of the state's upper house with the balance of power controlled by a variety of minor parties and independents.

=== Electoral systems ===
Originally, the electoral system for both houses was a form of plurality voting, where each voter is given as many votes as there are candidates to be elected. From 1929, this was changed to instant-runoff voting, with multi-member districts using the preferential block voting variant of the system. In 1973, as part of the reforms to the upper house, the Legislative Council switched to using a party list form of proportional representation voting that was subsequently changed to the single transferable vote in 1982. From 1985 until 2017, the Legislative Council also used a form of Group voting tickets similar to that used in the Senate at the time. This enabled voters to choose between voting 'above the line' (for a single party preference ticket that ranked all candidates on the ballot paper in the party's preferred order) or 'below the line' and number all candidates in order of preference, on the ballot paper. In 2017 this was changed to a form of optional preferential voting − instructions for above the line votes are to mark '1' and then further preferences are optional as opposed to preference flows from simply '1' above the line being determined by group voting tickets, while instructions for voters who instead opt to vote below the line are to provide at least 12 preferences as opposed to having to number all candidates, and with a savings provision to admit ballot papers which indicate at least 6 below the line preferences.

Today, the House of Assembly continues to use instant-runoff voting with compulsory preferences.

Compulsory voting was introduced for the House of Assembly in 1942 and for the Legislative Council in 1985.

Elections were held every 3 years until 1985 (with a brief flirtation with 5 year terms for the House of Assembly in the 1933-1938 parliament), when the parliament switched to 4 year terms, meaning 8 year terms for the upper house. Beginning in 2006, election dates have been fixed at the third Saturday in March of every fourth year.

== House of Assembly ==
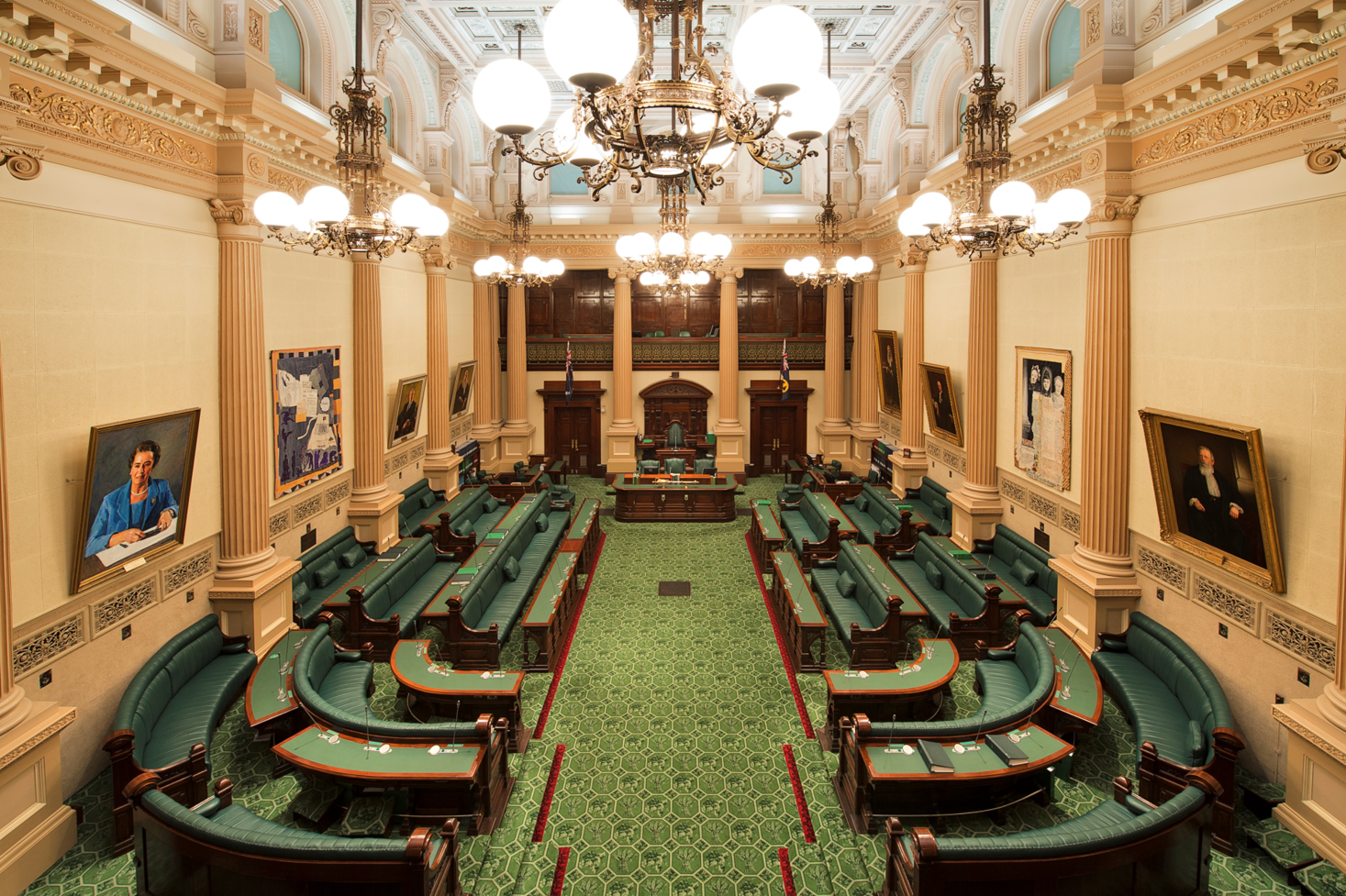
House of Assembly chamber

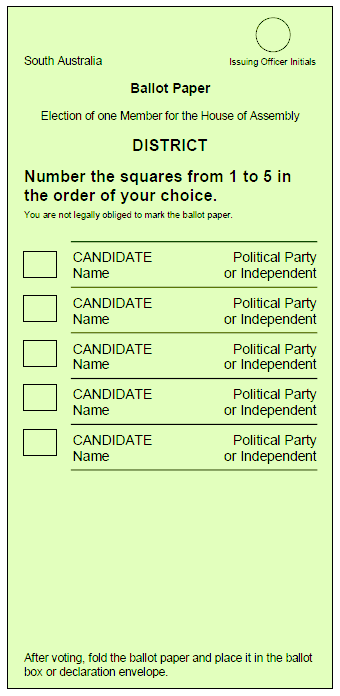
South Australian House of Assembly ballot paper

The House of Assembly (or "lower house") is made up of 47 members who are each elected by the full-preference instant-runoff voting system in single-member electorates. Each of the 47 electoral districts (electorates) contains approximately the same number of voters. Casual vacancies, when a member retires or dies in office mid-term, are filled by a by-election in that member's district.

Since 1975, the distribution of electoral boundaries has been set by the South Australian Electoral Districts Boundaries Commission, an independent body. Since a referendum in 1991, boundaries have been redistributed after each election. Previously they were redistributed after every third election.

Government is formed in the House of Assembly by the leader of the party or coalition who can demonstrate they have the support of the majority of the House, and is called upon by the Governor to form government. The leader of the government becomes the Premier. The House is presided over by a Speaker, who, as of the passage of the Constitution (Independent Speaker) Amendment Act 2021, is constitutionally banned from being a member of a registered political party outside of a "relevant election period".

While South Australia's total population is 1.7 million, Adelaide's population is 1.3 million − uniquely, over 75 percent of the state's population resides in the metropolitan area and has 72 percent of seats (34 of 47) alongside a lack of comparatively-sized rural population centres, therefore the metropolitan area tends to decide election outcomes. At the 2014 election for example, although the statewide two-party vote (2PP) was 47.0% Labor v 53.0% Liberal, the metropolitan area recorded a 2PP of 51.5% Labor v 48.5% Liberal.

The term for the House of Assembly is a fixed 4-year term but the state Constitution does allow the Governor to dissolve the House early and call for a fresh general election under certain circumstances. These are: If the House passes a motion of no confidence in the government, the House defeats a motion of confidence in the government, or if a bill that has been designated by the House as a "bill of special importance" is passed by the House of Assembly but is rejected by the Legislative Council. The House of Assembly can also be dissolved early together with the full Legislative Council in what is known as a double dissolution in order to resolve deadlocks between the two Houses. The circumstances for such a double dissolution are outlined below.

== Legislative Council ==
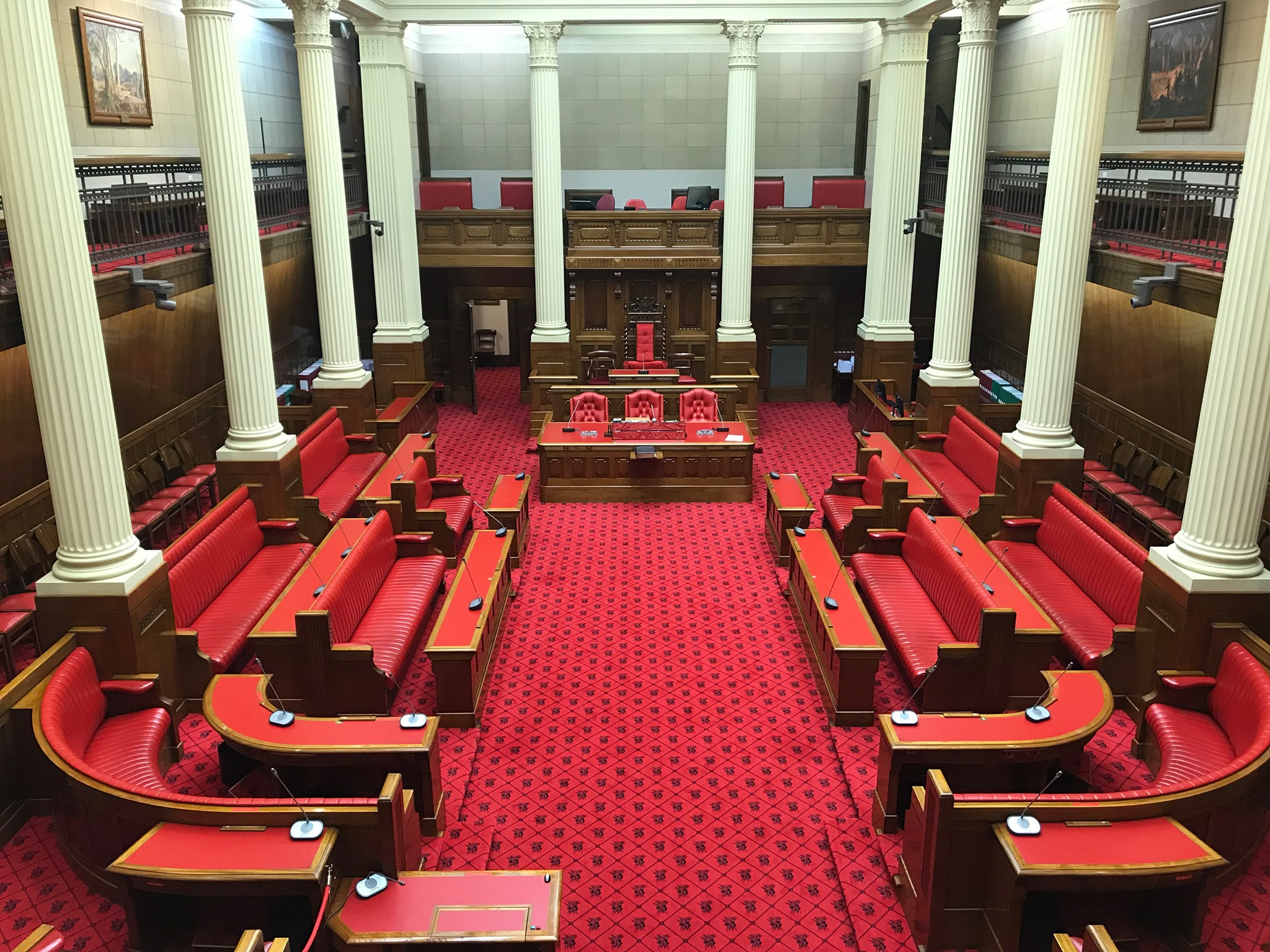
Legislative Council chamber

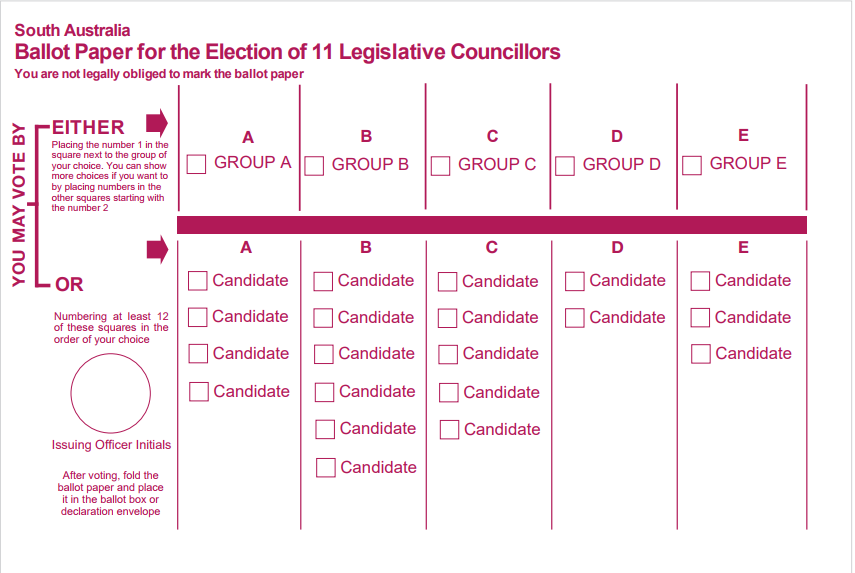
South Australian Legislative Council ballot paper

The Legislative Council (or "upper house") is made up of 22 councillors (MLCs) who are elected for the entire state by the Proportional Representation single transferable voting system (with optional preferential voting) to serve for a term that is usually 8 years. Elections for the Legislative Council are staggered so that 11 seats are up for re-election every 4 years, at the same time as House of Assembly elections. Legislative Councillors may serve shorter or longer terms than the usual 8 years in the event of an early dissolution of the House of Assembly. If half the chamber has served at least 6 years at the time of a dissolution, then they go up for election, but if all Legislative Councillors have served less than 6 years, only the House of Assembly faces the people.

In the event of a casual vacancy, members of the Legislative Council are filled by an assembly of the members of both houses of parliament. If the member whose seat has become vacant was elected as a member of a political party, the assembly must, if possible, replace them with a nominated member of that party.

The Legislative Council has almost equal powers to the House of Assembly. The only difference is that the upper house does not have the ability to initiate or amend bills that appropriate money or levy taxes. The Council may still request amendments to these bills and retains the right to reject money bills that it disagrees with.

The primary function of the Legislative Council is to review legislation which has been passed by the House of Assembly. This can cause tensions between the government and the Legislative Council, which may be viewed by the former as obstructionist if it rejects key legislation, as can happen at times when the electoral makeup of the two Houses are different. Another important function of the upper house is to scrutinise government activity, which it does both in the chamber and through committees. As Legislative Councillors have been elected using proportional representation since the mid-1970s, the chamber features a multitude of parties vying for power. A government or opposition majority in the upper house has been unachievable since the introduction of this system, with the balance of power being held by a number of minor parties and independents.

== Resolution of deadlocks between the Houses ==
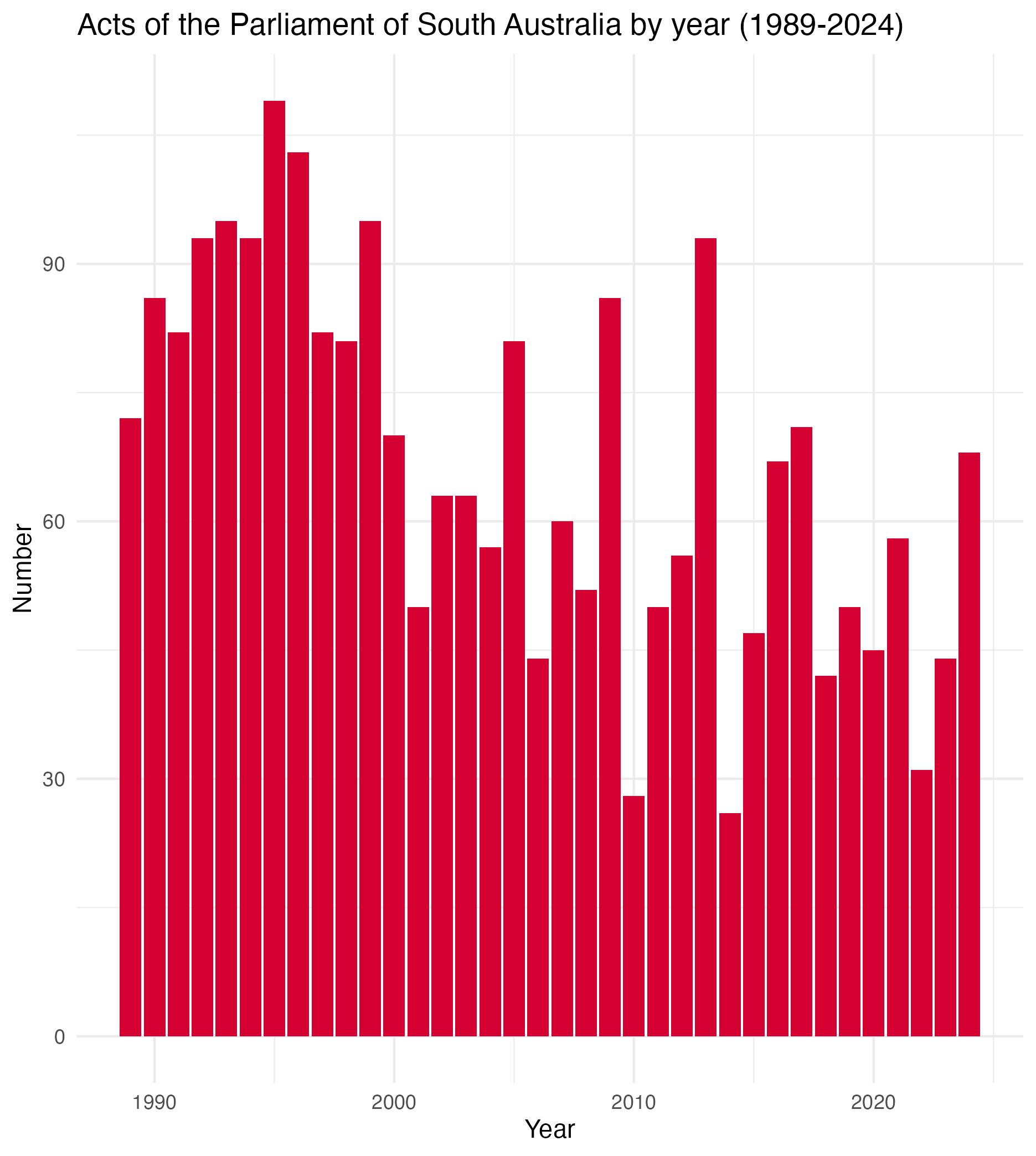
Bar chart showing the number of acts of the Parliament of South Australia by year (1989-2024)

In the event that there is a conflict between the two Houses over legislation, the South Australian Constitution lays out a mechanism for how these deadlocks can be resolved.

Under section 41 of the South Australian Constitution, if a bill is passed by the House of Assembly during a session of parliament and in the following parliament after a general election for the lower house is rejected by the Legislative Council on both occasions, it is permitted for the Governor to either issue a writ for the election of 2 additional members of the Legislative Council or to dissolve both Houses at the same time to elect an entirely new parliament. This procedure is known as a double dissolution. As the upper house consists of 22 members, with 11 elected statewide at each general election for an 8-year term at a quota of 8.33%, this would result in an election for all 22 members at a quota of 4.35%. In the event of a double dissolution election, the 11 Legislative Councillors that would not have won their seats under an ordinary election go up for re-election at the first general election after only serving 3 years, rather than the usual 6 years.

Although it has been threatened, this South Australian double dissolution procedure has never been used.

Although the practice has mostly fallen out of favour in other parliaments that use a bicameral Westminster system, the South Australian parliament still regularly appoints a "Conference of Managers" from each House to negotiate compromises on disputed bills in private. The Conference Managers then prepare a report of recommendations that is submitted to both Houses.

== Salaries of Members of Parliament ==
Salaries of South Australian Members of Parliament (MPs), which include all Legislative Councillors and Members of the House of Assembly, are tied by the Parliamentary Remuneration Act 1990 (SA) to those of Australian Federal MPs, less A$42,000. An independent remuneration tribunal sets the Federal base salaries. The independent Remuneration Tribunal of South Australia additionally determines a range of additional remuneration-related provisions for MPs, such as private plated vehicles and electorate and the common allowance, which replaced and travel related allowances for MPs and is currently set at A$20,503 since 1 December 2024.

Since the Australian remuneration tribunals' determination of 1 July 2025, the basic annual salary of a South Australian MP is A$197,270 with an additional common allowance of A$20,503 totalling A$217,773 (which is the federal base salary of $239,270 less $42,000 plus an additional common allowance of $20,503).

The remuneration of South Australian MPs, including Ministers and Parliamentary office holders, is made up of several components:

1. Base salary.
2. Additional salary (payable to MPs who are also Ministers of office holders).
3. Common allowance (which replaced travel allowances).
4. Electorate allowance (for the provision of staff and resources.
5. Non-monetary benefits (such as a private motor vehicle).
6. Parliamentary committee allowance.

=== Remuneration of Ministers and office holders ===
Ministers and office holders, such as the Leader of the Opposition, the Speaker of the House, and the President of the Council, are entitled to additional salary, which is set by the Parliamentary Remuneration Act 1990 (SA). As an example, the Leader of the Opposition is entitled to an additional 75% of the A$197,270 (2025) base salary, which is an additional $147,953, totalling an annual salary of $345,223 (rounded to the nearest dollar).

Additional salary of Ministerial and parliamentary office holders at 1 July 2025 Rounded to the nearest $1. (list incomplete)
Office	Base salary	Additional %	Total annual salary
Premier	$217,773	100%	$435,546
Deputy Premier	$217,773	85%	$402,880
Leader of the Opposition in the House	$217,773	75%	$381,103
Leader of the Opposition in the Council	$217,773	60%	$348,440
Speaker	$217,773	75%	$381,103
Cabinet Minister	$217,773	75%	$381,103
Shadow Minister	$217,773	25%	$272,220
Parliamentary Secretary/Assistant Minister	$217,773	20%	$261,328

== State First Nations Voice ==
As of the passage of the First Nations Voice Act 2023 in March 2023, South Australia also has an Aboriginal Voice to Parliament able to represent South Australia's Aboriginal population to the state parliament and government. The Act was launched in a ceremony led by premier Peter Malinauskas, who acknowledged the work done by Attorney-General and Aboriginal Affairs Minister Kyam Maher, and First Nations Commissioner Dale Agius, to achieve the passing of the bill. A large crowd attended despite rainy weather, and Major "Moogy" Sumner spoke, danced, and performed the Welcome to Country.

The state is divided into six regions, whose Aboriginal voters will, at each state election, elect a "Local Voice" with gender parity. These local voices then elect one male and one female member each to be their joint presiding officers and sit on the "State First Nations Voice". The State Voice then in turn elects its own male and female joint presiding officers who have the right to enter either house of parliament to make speeches on bills that are of interest to the First Nations peoples in South Australia. They do not have the ability to vote on legislation. The State Voice can also address state cabinet and government departments.

== Longest-serving members ==
Members of the South Australian upper and lower houses with over 30 years of service.

Name	Party	Chamber	Start of tenure	End of tenure	Period of service
Sir Lancelot Stirling	Liberal Union	House of Assembly	5 April 1881	5 April 1887	48 years, 309 days
Sir Lancelot Stirling	Liberal Union	House of Assembly	12 May 1888	22 April 1890	48 years, 309 days
Sir Lancelot Stirling	Liberal Union	Legislative Council	11 July 1891	24 May 1932†	48 years, 309 days
Sir Walter Duncan	Liberal and Country League	Legislative Council	6 April 1918	2 March 1962	43 years, 330 days
Sir Robert Nicholls	Liberal and Country League	House of Assembly	27 March 1915	2 March 1956	40 years, 341 days
Sir Lyell McEwin	Liberal and Country League	Legislative Council	20 October 1934	11 July 1975	40 years, 264 days
Sir George Ritchie	Liberal and Country League	House of Assembly	3 May 1902	2 November 1922	40 years, 216 days
Sir George Ritchie	Liberal and Country League	Legislative Council	5 April 1924	28 April 1944	40 years, 216 days
Graham Gunn	Liberal	House of Assembly	30 May 1970	20 March 2010	39 years, 294 days
Rob Lucas	Liberal	Legislative Council	6 November 1982	19 March 2022	39 years, 133 days
Sir Malcolm McIntosh	Liberal	House of Assembly	8 April 1921	16 February 1959	37 years, 314 days
Lindsay Riches	Labor	House of Assembly	8 April 1933	29 May 1970	37 years, 51 days
Tom Stott	Independent	House of Assembly	8 April 1933	29 May 1970	37 years, 51 days
James Howe	Independent	House of Assembly	27 April 1881	24 April 1896	35 years, 323 days
James Howe	Independent	Legislative Council	22 May 1897	5 April 1918	35 years, 323 days
Frank Condon	Labor	House of Assembly	5 April 1924	25 March 1927	35 years, 258 days
Frank Condon	Labor	Legislative Council	27 October 1928	15 July 1961†	35 years, 258 days
Sir Thomas Playford IV	Liberal and Country League	House of Assembly	8 April 1933	1 March 1968	34 years, 328 days
Howard Shannon	Liberal and Country League	House of Assembly	8 April 1933	1 March 1968	34 years, 328 days
Frederick Coneybeer	Labor	House of Assembly	15 April 1893	8 April 1921	33 years, 363 days
Frederick Coneybeer	Labor	House of Assembly	5 April 1924	3 April 1930	33 years, 363 days
Sir John Cowan	Liberal and Country League	Legislative Council	2 April 1910	29 February 1944	33 years, 333 days
Sir Richard Butler	Independent	House of Assembly	13 August 1890	4 April 1924	33 years, 235 days
Sir Jenkin Coles	National Defence League	House of Assembly	17 May 1875	15 April 1878	33 years, 181 days
Sir Jenkin Coles	National Defence League	House of Assembly	25 April 1881	17 November 1911	33 years, 181 days
Thomas Pascoe	Liberal and Country League	Legislative Council	19 May 1900	28 February 1933	32 years, 285 days
Sir George Jenkins	Liberal and Country League	House of Assembly	6 April 1918	4 April 1924	31 years, 344 days
Sir George Jenkins	Liberal and Country League	House of Assembly	26 March 1927	4 April 1930	31 years, 344 days
Sir George Jenkins	Liberal and Country League	House of Assembly	8 April 1933	2 March 1956	31 years, 344 days
Bill Denny	Labor	House of Assembly	17 March 1900	26 May 1905	31 years, 233 days
Bill Denny	Labor	House of Assembly	3 November 1906	7 April 1933	31 years, 233 days
Robert Richards	Labor	House of Assembly	6 April 1918	22 November 1949	31 years, 230 days
Thomas Burgoyne	Independent	House of Assembly	23 April 1884	26 March 1915	30 years, 337 days
Sir David Gordon	Commonwealth Liberal	Legislative Council	15 November 1913	28 April 1944	30 years, 165 days

The longest serving current member of Parliament is Tom Koutsantonis, who was elected to State Parliament in 1997 at age 26.

== Location ==
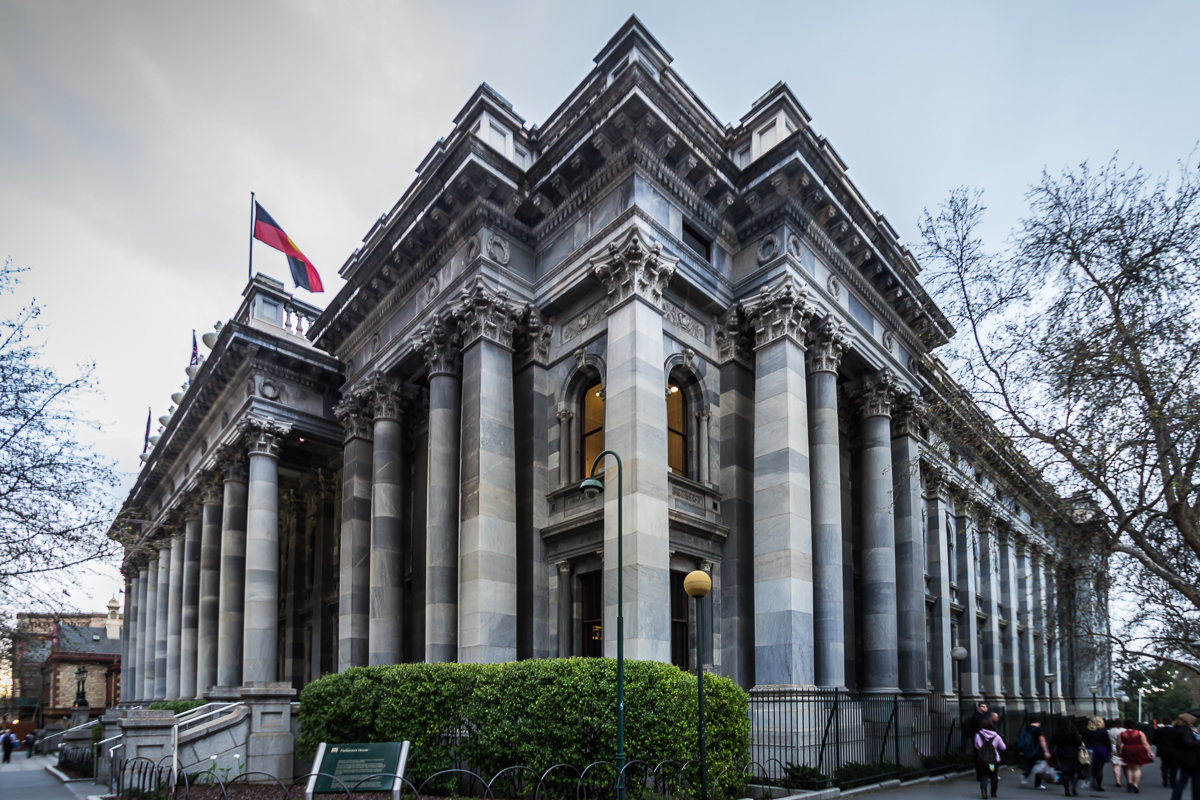
Parliament House

A 50-minute tour of the South Australian Parliament House

The seat of the Parliament of South Australia is Parliament House in the state capital of Adelaide. Parliament House sits on the North-Western corner of the intersection of King William Street and North Terrace. It was built to replace the adjacent and overcrowded Parliament House, now referred to as "Old Parliament House", which dated from 1843 with extensions in 1857. Due to financial constraints, the current Parliament House was constructed in stages over 65 years from 1874 to 1939.

Following the completion of the New Parliament House in 1939, The Old Parliament House has been used for a variety of functions including as a Royal Australian Air Force recruiting office, offices for government departments and as a "Constitutional Museum." In 1995, the building reverted to use by the parliament and has been used as offices and committee rooms ever since.

== See also ==
- Lists of acts of the Parliament of South Australia
- Constitution of South Australia
- List of elections in South Australia
- Official openings by the monarch in Australia
- Parliaments of the Australian states and territories
