= Constitution of South Australia =

Australian state constitution

South Australian Constitution

Overview
- Original title: Constitution Act 1934 (SA), s. 1
- Jurisdiction: South Australia
- Ratified: 18 October 1934
- Date effective: 1 January 1935
- System: State Government

Government structure
- Branches: Executive; Legislative; Judicial
- Chambers: House of Assembly; Legislative Council
- Executive: See South Australian Government
- Judiciary: See Judiciary of Australia

History
- Amendments: 78 (77 Parliamentary Amendments and 1 Constitutional Referendum)
- Last amended: First Nations Voice Act 2023
- Signatories: Governor Winston Dugan
- Supersedes: Constitution Act 1856 (SA)

The principles of the current Constitution of South Australia, also known as the South Australian Constitution, which includes the rules and procedures for the government of the State of South Australia, are set out in the Constitution Act 1934. Its long title is "An Act to provide for the Constitution of the State; and for other purposes".

The Act provides for certain sections to be altered by the process of a Bill proposing a change passing all readings, approval by a majority of members in both houses of parliament prior to being assented to by the Governor. It also specifies those sections of the South Australian Constitution that must not only pass a majority vote in both Houses but must then be put to the people of South Australia at a referendum.

The first Act to set out the South Australian Constitution was the Constitution Act 1856, which was the first Constitution in the Australian colonies to provide universal manhood suffrage.

== History ==
=== South Australian Colonisation Act 1834 ===
South Australia's Constitutional structure has undergone numerous changes since its settlement by Europeans in the 19th century. In 1834 the Imperial Parliament passed the South Australian Colonisation Act 1834 (4 & 5 Will. 4. c. 95), which authorised the King-in-Council to establish a colony called the 'Province of South Australia' and to provide for a government for the province. The new colony would consist of a Governor to make laws and Colonisation Commissioners, the later being responsible for the sale of land to free settlers. However it was not until the 19th of February 1836, by letters-patent, that the King officially exercised that power. Empowered by the King, the First Fleet of South Australia that had arrived in the territory, under the leadership of the new Governor John Hindmarsh, officially proclaimed the new Province of South Australia at Glenelg on 28 December 1836. The anniversary of this event is now a public holiday and is known as Proclamation Day.

=== South Australian Colonisation Act 1838 ===
By 1838, the division of powers between the Governor and the Colonisation Commissioners was found to be unworkable and the South Australian Colonisation Act 1834 was amended by the Imperial Parliament. The Governor was appointed Resident Commissioner and the power of the other commissioners were redefined. Additional powers were also conferred upon three or more appointed residents of the province that would act in conjunction with the Governor to pass new laws. This body can be considered South Australia's first legislature and a precursor to the Legislative Council.

=== South Australia Act 1842 ===
In 1842, the Imperial Parliament passed the South Australia Act 1842 (5 & 6 Vict. c. 61), which further reformed the structure of government in South Australia. The act repealed the South Australian Colonisation Act 1834 and the South Australian Colonisation Act 1838, and empowered the Queen-in-Council to establish a Legislative Council to make laws for the province. The council was to consist of the Governor and seven other members (three appointed and four chosen by certain colonists). In addition to this, the act also abolished the Colonisation Commissioners.

=== Australian Constitutions Act 1850 ===
In 1850, the Imperial Parliament passed the Australian Constitutions Act 1850 (13 & 14 Vict. c. 59), to separate the District of Port Phillip from the Colony of New South Wales and create the Colony of Victoria. This act also had implications for the governments of the other existing colonies as well, by amending the structures of their governments. South Australia's Legislative Council was expanded to not more than 24 members, a third to be appointed by the Queen and the remainder to be elected. The Act also gave the power to the respective colonial legislatures to enact their own colonial constitutions.

=== Constitution Act 1856 ===
Empowered by the Australian Constitutions Act 1850, the South Australian Legislative Council enacted its first proper Constitution in 1856, titled the 'South Australian Constitution Act'. It was the first Constitution in the Australian colonies to provide manhood suffrage, that is, all male residents of the colony over 21 years of age could vote in elections.

This Act provided for a bicameral parliament with full authority to enact laws, apart from a few acts requiring royal assent. The Legislative Council was elected by property owners only, while the 37-member House of Assembly was elected on a broad male franchise.

The adoption of the "one value, one vote" principle removed the ability of voters to vote in any electorate in which they owned property. The act also defined the rules of tenure for the parliamentarians. The Act was amended by the Constitutional Amendment (Adult Suffrage) Act 1894 to give women the right to both vote and stand for parliament.

=== Commonwealth of Australia Constitution Act 1900 ===
With the enactment of the Commonwealth Constitution on 1 January 1901, the Province of South Australia was transformed into a state of the Commonwealth. Sections 106, 107 and 108 of the Commonwealth Constitution preserved the application of the Colonial Constitution of 1856, which became a state constitution along with all the laws of the Parliament that previously existed (so far as they were not inconsistent with the Commonwealth Constitution or federal acts of the new Commonwealth Parliament, as per section 109. The Constitution of 1856 continued to be in force until it was repealed and replaced by a new State Constitution in 1934.

=== Constitution Act 1934 ===
The Constitution Act 1934 (long title "An Act to provide for the Constitution of the State; and for other purposes") repealed a number of older Acts, including the 1856 Act and several Constitution Amendment Acts. It has since been amended on many occasions, with the latest amendment as of March 2022 having been assented to on 18 April 2024.

=== 2013 amendment to recognise Aboriginal peoples ===
In March 2013 an amendment was introduced to include a statement of recognition of Aboriginal Australians, via the Constitution (Recognition of Aboriginal Peoples) Amendment Act 2013. Wording included in Section 3 includes:

(2) Following the Apology given on 28 May 1997, the Parliament, on behalf of the people of South Australia — acknowledges and respects Aboriginal peoples as the State's first peoples and nations; and

(b) recognises Aboriginal peoples as traditional owners and occupants of land and waters in South Australia and that— (i) their spiritual, social, cultural and economic practices come from their traditional lands and waters; and (ii) they maintain their cultural and heritage beliefs, languages and laws which are of ongoing importance; and (iii) they have made and continue to make a unique and irreplaceable contribution to the State; and

(c) acknowledges that the Aboriginal peoples have endured past injustice and dispossession of their traditional lands and waters.

== Document structure and text ==
The Constitution is divided into six parts

=== Part 1: Preliminary ===
This part is relatively short and deals with the Constitution's long title, and additionally includes an amendment that recognises Aboriginal Australians as the First Nations of the state. This was introduced in 2013, but section 2(3) of the amendment specifies that this recognition be of no legal force or effect.

=== Part 2: The Legislature ===
This part deals with the structure, functions and powers of the South Australian Parliament. It is composed of two chambers, the Legislative Council (the upper chamber), and the House of Assembly (the lower chamber). The Legislative Council is composed of 22 members elected by the state as a whole for eight year terms. The terms of legislative councillors are staggered, meaning that only half of the council goes up for election every 4 years (11 out of 22). Section 23 provides that the members of the Legislative Council shall elect a President, to preside over the chamber.

The House of Assembly is made up of 47 members elected from individual electoral districts situated around the state. Every member of the House serves fixed four year terms. Section 34 provides for the election of a speaker by members of the House, to preside over the business of the Chamber. In 2021 an amendment was introduced to require that the Speaker either be an independent or vacate their party affiliation.

Several sections in this part provide that any amendment that would abolish of either chamber of Parliament, or would alter the powers of the Legislative Council, would require a referendum of the majority of the people in the state.

Other notable sections include: Section 44, which prevents judges from being members of Parliament; Section 47, which prevents being a members of South Australian parliament and the Commonwealth Parliament simultaneously, Sections 48 and 48A, which guarantees the right of women to vote and be members of Parliament.

=== Part 2a: Local Government ===
This part provides for a constitutional guarantee of the continuity of local government. This part was the result of an amendment in 2003.

=== Part 3: The Executive ===
This part deals with the Executive Government of the state. Which include the appointment of the Premier and their ministers, as well as Parliamentary Secretaries. This part also deals with the Governor, the Executive Council and the appointment of the Lieutenant-Governor. The Governor may also appoint a deputy, a deputy to the Lieutenant Governor or an administrator to act in absence of the Governor. The role and function of the Governor as well as the Executive Council are further detailed by the letters-patent issued by Queen Elizabeth in 1986. Section 68 also deals with the appointment of public servants

=== Part 4: The Judiciary ===
This part is short and contains three sections, that deal with the tenure and removal of judges of the Supreme Court of South Australia. The role, powers, structure and function of the Supreme Court is further detailed by the Supreme Court Act 1935.

=== Part 5: Electoral Redistribution ===
This part deals with the Electoral Districts Boundaries Commission, which is an independent non-partisan body responsible for redrawing the boundaries of the 47 single member districts of the House of Assembly. This section was introduced in an amendment in 1975 by the government of former Premier Don Dunstan, to ensure fair and competitive elections for the Parliament. This undid the gerrymandering of Australia's longest serving Premier Thomas Playford, which kept his Liberal and Country League Government in power for almost 32 years.

Section 88 of this part provides that specific amendments that would alter the Constitution's democratic protections in this part would require a referendum of the majority of the people in the state.

An amendment in 1990 proposed by the Labor Government of Premier John Bannon, altered this part as to require a redrawing of the electoral boundaries before every election. As such a move required approval of the people of the state, South Australia held its first (and to date only) State Constitutional referendum in 1991, since the enactment of the new State Constitution in 1934. The referendum passed with 74% in favour of the amendment.

=== Part 6: Miscellaneous ===
This part provides for the continuity of the South Australian government in the advent of the death of the monarch.

== See also ==
- State constitutions in Australia
