= Constitution Act 1902 =

Australian state constitution

New South Wales Constitution

Overview
- Jurisdiction: New South Wales
- Ratified: 18 August 1902
- Date effective: 18 August 1902
- System: State Government

Government structure
- Branches: Executive; Legislative; Judicial
- Chambers: Legislative Assembly; Legislative Council
- Executive: See New South Wales Government
- Judiciary: See Judiciary of Australia

History
- Amendments: 97 (89 Parliamentary amendments and 8 referendums)
- Last amended: Government Sector Employment and Other Legislation Amendment Act 2024
- Citation: Constitution Act 1902 (NSW)
- Signatories: Governor Harry Rawson
- Supersedes: Constitution Act 1855 (NSW)

The Constitution of New South Wales is composed of both unwritten and written elements that set out the structure of Government in the State of New South Wales. While the most important parts are codified in the Constitution Act 1902, major parts of the broader constitution can also be found in:

- important constitutional statutes, such as the Parliamentary Electorates and Elections Act 1912 or the Supreme Court Act 1970
- the common law
- constitutional conventions,
- the Australian Constitution,
- the Australia Acts,
- any remaining applicable British legislation, such as the Bill of Rights 1689.

The Constitution Act 1902 sets out many of the basic principles of the Government of New South Wales, and provides for an executive, legislative and judicial branch. However, unlike the Federal Constitution, the courts have found this does not mean there is a formal separation of powers at the state level. It can also generally be amended through ordinary Acts of Parliament, although some sections can only be amended through a referendum of NSW voters.

== History ==
In 1853 the New South Wales Legislative Council, then a unicameral body, with a hybrid of appointed and elected members, passed the New South Wales Constitution Bill in 1853, also referred to as 17 Vic. No 41, which was reserved for the Queen's assent, which the Queen did not give. Instead the Imperial Parliament at Westminster passed the New South Wales Constitution Act 1855 (18 & 19 Vict. c. 54 (Imp)) which included a modified bill as schedule. It was this modified bill to which the Queen assented.

The 1902 act repealed all or part of eight previous acts.

Act	Reference	Extent	Ref
New Constitution Act 1853 No 41a	17 Vic. No. 41. (Note: Refers to the 17th year of Queen Victoria's reign, commencing on 20 June 1837, and the 41st Act passed after 20 June 1853.)	unrepealed portion	
Civil List Increase Act 1857 No 14a	20 Vic. No. 18	The whole	
Triennial Parliaments Act 1874 No 2a	37 Vic. No. 7	The whole	
Executive Councillors (Functions Substitution) Act No 27a	44 Vic. No. 6	The whole	
Constitution Act Amendment Act of 1884 No 3a	47 Vic. No. 5	The whole	
Constitution Act Amendment Act of 1890 No 1a	54 Vic. No. 1	The whole	
Governor's Salary Act 1901 No 40	Act No 40, 1901	Section 2, subsection (4)	

== Document structure and text ==
The act originally consisted of six parts, to which an additional five parts have since been added.

- Part 1 Preliminary.
- Part 2 Powers of the Legislature.
- Part 2A The Governor, added in 1987.
- Part 3 The Legislative Council and Legislative Assembly.
- Part 4 The Executive.
- Part 4A Parliamentary Secretaries, added in 1975.
- Part 5 The Consolidated Fund.
- Part 6 Officers and staff.
- Part 7 Administrative arrangements, added in 1984.
- Part 8 Local government, added in 1986.
- Part 9 The judiciary, added in 1992.
- Part 10 Public ownership of Sydney Water Corporation and Hunter Water Corporation, added in 2023.

== Alterations to the Constitution ==
=== By parliament ===
In contrast to the Constitution of Australia, the New South Wales constitution was not approved by a referendum and did not contain any provision requiring a referendum to alter it. In 1929 the parliament passed an amendment to the Constitution Act which inserted section 7A, requiring a referendum before the Legislative Council could be abolished. In 1930 Labor MLCs put forward two bills, one to repeal section 7A, the other to abolish the Council. Believing that a referendum was necessary before the bills could become law, the Legislative Council permitted the bills to pass without a division on 10 December. The validity of section 7A and the inability to repeal the section without a referendum were upheld by the Supreme Court on 23 December 1930, a majority of the High Court on 16 March 1931, and the Judicial Committee of the Privy Council on 31 May 1932.

As of 15 December 2025, the Constitution Act 1902 has been amended through Parliament by the following acts:

Act	Ref
Parliamentary Elections Act 1906	
Parliamentary Representatives Allowance Act 1907	
Parliamentary Representatives Allowance Act 1912	
Parliamentary Electorates and Elections Act 1912	
Parliamentary Representatives Allowance and Ministers' Salaries (Amendment) Act 1920	
Parliamentary Allowances and Salaries Act 1922	
Parliamentary Allowances and Salaries Act 1925	
Constitution (Amendment) Act 1925 (Note: Took effect in 1926)	
Audit (Amendment) Act 1929	
Constitution (Legislative Council) Amendment Act 1929	
Parliamentary Allowances and Salaries Act 1930	
Parliamentary Allowances and Salaries Act 1932	
Constitution Amendment (Legislative Council) Act, 1932 (Note: Act received Royal Assent in 1933.)	
Demise of the Crown (Amendment) Act 1936	
Parliamentary Allowances and Salaries Act 1938	
Parliamentary Allowances and Salaries Act 1947	
Constitution Amendment (Legislative Council Members Allowances) Act 1948	
Parliamentary Allowances and Salaries Act 1951	
Parliamentary Allowances and Salaries Act 1956	
Parliamentary Allowances and Salaries Act 1959	
Constitution (Amendment) Act 1962	
Parliamentary Allowances and Salaries (Amendment) Act 1963	
Decimal Currency Act 1965	
Parliamentary Allowances and Salaries (Amendment) Act 1966	
Constitution (Amendment) Act 1968	
Parliamentary Allowances and Salaries (Amendment) Act 1971	
Reprints Act 1972	
Parliamentary Allowances and Salaries (Amendment) Act 1974	
Parliamentary Allowances and Salaries (Amendment) Act 1975	
Parliamentary Remuneration Tribunal Act 1975	
Constitution and Other Acts (Amendment) Act 1975	
Constitution (Ministers of the Crown) Amendment Act 1976	
Constitution (Amendment) Act 1978	
Constitution and Parliamentary Electorates and Elections (Amendment) Act 1978	
Constitution (Amendment) Act 1979	
Constitution (Public Service) Amendment Act 1979	
Constitution (Amendment) Act 1980	
Constitution (Legislative Assembly) Amendment Act 1981 (Note: Act received Royal Assent in 1982 following referendum.)	
Constitution (Disclosures by Members) Amendment Act 1981	
Constitution (Consolidated Fund) Amendment Act 1982	
Miscellaneous Acts (Public Finance and Audit) Repeal and Amendment Act 1983	
Constitution (Enrolment of Acts) Amendment Act 1984	
Statute Law (Miscellaneous Amendments) Act 1984	
Statute Law (Miscellaneous Provisions) Act 1986	
Constitution (Amendment) Act 1986	
Constitution (Local Government) Amendment Act 1986	
Statute Law (Miscellaneous Provisions) Act (No 1) 1987	
Constitution (Amendment) Act 1987	
Constitution (Parliamentary Secretaries) Amendment Act 1988	
Constitution (Governor's Salary) Amendment Act 1988	
Constitution (Legislative Assembly) Amendment Act 1990	
Constitution and Parliamentary Electorates and Elections (Amendment) Act 1990	
Statute Law (Miscellaneous Provisions) Act 1991	
Constitution (Legislative Council) Amendment Act 1991	
Constitution (Legislative Council) Further Amendment Act 1991	
Constitution (Amendment) Act 1992	
Constitution (Fixed Term Parliaments) Amendment Act 1993 (Note: Act received Royal Assent in 1995 following referendum.)	
Constitution (Entrenchment) Amendment Act 1992	
Public Sector Management Amendment Act 1995	
Industrial Relations Act 1996	
Constitution and Parliamentary Electorates and Elections Amendment Act 1997	
Statute Law (Miscellaneous Provisions) Act 1999	
Crimes Legislation Amendment (Sentencing) Act 1999	
Constitution Amendment Act 2000	
Constitution Amendment (Governor's Salary) Act 2003	
Courts Legislation Amendment Act 2005	
Constitution Amendment (Pledge of Loyalty) Act 2006	
Constitution Amendment (Governor) Act 2006	
Statute Law (Miscellaneous Provisions) Act 2007	
Constitution Amendment (Speaker) Act 2007	
Miscellaneous Acts (Local Court) Amendment Act 2007	
Statute Law (Miscellaneous Provisions) Act (No 2) 2008	
Children Legislation Amendment (Wood Inquiry Recommendations) Act 2009	
Parliamentary Remuneration Amendment (Salary Packaging) Act 2009	
Constitution Amendment (Lieutenant-Governor) Act 2009	
Constitution Amendment (Recognition of Aboriginal People) Act 2010	
Constitution Amendment (Prorogation of Parliament) Act 2011	
Constitution Amendment (Restoration of Oaths of Allegiance) Act 2012	
Government Sector Employment Act 2013	
Statute Law (Miscellaneous Provisions) Act 2014	
Constitution Amendment (Parliamentary Presiding Officers) Act 2014	
Government Sector Employment Legislation Amendment Act 2016	
Crown Land Legislation Amendment Act 2017	
Electoral Act 2017	
COVID-19 Legislation Amendment (Emergency Measures) Act 2020	
COVID-19 Legislation Amendment (Stronger Communities and Health) Act 2021	
COVID-19 and Other Legislation Amendment (Regulatory Reforms) Act 2022	
Constitution Amendment (Virtual Attendance) Act 2022	
Constitution Amendment (Appointment of Lieutenant-Governor and Administrator) Act 2022	
Integrity Legislation Amendment Act 2022	
Constitution Amendment (Sydney Water and Hunter Water) Act 2023	
Constitution Amendment (Executive Council) Act 2024	
Government Sector Employment and Other Legislation Amendment Act 2024	
District Court Legislation Amendment Act 2025	

=== Referendums ===
There have been 18 referendums in New South Wales, 8 of which concerned proposals to amend the New South Wales Constitution, half of which concerned the Legislative Council. The list does not include referendums that did not involve changes to the NSW constitution, such as the 1898 and 1899 referendums on the proposed constitution of Australia, the 1903 referendum on the number of Members of the Legislative Assembly and the 5 referendums on the sale of alcohol.

Results of referendums
Year	#	Name	Yes	No	Ref
1933	4	Reform the Legislative Council	51.47	48.53	
1961	7	Abolish the Legislative Council	42.42	57.58	
1978	11	Election of Legislative Council	84.81	15.19	
1981	12	4 year terms	69.04	30.96	
1981	13	Disclosure of pecuniary interests	86.01	13.99	
1991	14	Reduce size of Legislative Council	57.73	42.27	
1995	15	Fixed terms of parliament	75.48	24.52	
1995	16	Judicial independence	65.90	34.10	

== Effect of the Constitution of Australia ==
The Constitution of Australia sets up the Commonwealth of Australia as a federation, with limited specific powers conferred on the Federal Parliament. The relationship between the states and the Commonwealth are dealt with in chapter V, including section 109 which provides that state laws are invalid to the extent of any inconsistency with federal laws. For the first two decades, the High Court preserved much of the financial and political independence of the states by adopting the reserved state powers and the implied inter-governmental immunities doctrine. These doctrines protected both the Commonwealth and the states from legislative or executive actions which "would fetter, control, or interfere with, the free exercise" of the legislative or executive power of the other. These doctrines were subsequently rejected by the court in the 1920 Engineers' Case after the composition of the court changed.

The High Court has held that the structure and text of the Constitution of Australia is such that the it protects the independence of the State Supreme Courts and a state parliament cannot assign powers that are incompatible with that independence, nor prevent State Supreme Courts from issuing prerogative relief for jurisdictional error.

== See also ==
- State constitutions in Australia
