= 1991 New South Wales referendum =

Australian regional legislature reform referendum

1991 New South Wales referendum
Legislative Council reform	Vote
Yes	57.7%
No	42.3%

A referendum concerning reform of the New South Wales Legislative Council was put to New South Wales voters on 25 May 1991. The referendum coincided with that year's New South Wales general election. The change passed comfortably. The text of the question was:

Do you approve of the Bill entitled 'A Bill for an Act:

(a) to reduce the number of politicians in the Legislative Council and to reduce their maximum term of office; and

(b) to apply to the Legislative Council the same method of filling casual vacancies as applies to the Senate ?

== Amendments to the constitution ==
At the time of the referendum, the Legislative Council consisted of 45 members, with 15 members elected at each election and members serving for three terms of the Legislative Assembly, giving a maximum term of 12 years. If a casual vacancy arose, the member was replaced by the next unelected candidate and it was only if the candidates were exhausted that the party could nominate a candidate at the election was declared.

The headline changes by the proposal were to alter the Constitution Act 1902 to:

- reduce the total number of members from 45 to 42;
- reduce the term of members from three to two terms of the Legislative Assembly, reducing the maximum term from 12 to 8 years; and
- increase the number of members elected at each election from 15 to 21, the effect of this was that the quota of votes to be elected would be reduced from 6.25% to 4.55%.
- require casual vacancies to be filled by appointment of a candidate nominated by the same political party.

The transitional arrangements were that from the 1991 election, the council would consist of:

- the 15 members elected at the 1991 election;
- the 15 members elected at the 1988 election; and
- the first 12 members elected at the 1984 election.

From the next election, scheduled to be in 1995, the council would consist of:

- the 21 members elected at the 1995 election;
- the 15 members elected at the 1991 election;
- the first 6 members elected at the 1988 election.

== Results ==
Result
Question		Votes	%
Legislative Council reform	Yes	1,864,293	57.73
Legislative Council reform	No	1,364,840	42.27
Total Formal		3,229,133	95.02
Informal		169,417	4.98
Turnout (Note: Based on a roll of 3,631,618: Green, Antony. "1991 election totals". New South Wales Election Results 1856-2007. Parliament of New South Wales.)		3,400,092	93.58

== Legislative Council referendums ==
This was the fourth referendum in New South Wales on the subject of the Legislative Council.

Legislative Council referendums
Referendum	Yes	No
(4) 1933 reform Legislative Council	51.47%	48.53%
(7) 1961 abolish Legislative Council	42.42%	57.58%
(11) 1978 directly elect Legislative Council	84.81%	15.19%
(14) 1991 reduce size of Legislative Council	57.73%	42.27%

== See also ==
- Referendums in New South Wales
- Referendums in Australia
- Government of New South Wales
