= South Australian Electoral Districts Boundaries Commission =

Agency overview
- Jurisdiction: Government of South Australia
- Website: edbc.sa.gov.au

The South Australian Electoral Districts Boundaries Commission is an independent, non partisan commission responsible for the compulsory re-drawing of South Australian House of Assembly electoral districts after each South Australian election.

The Commission was established in 1975 under an amendment to the South Australian Constitution to carry out periodic redistributions of the electoral boundaries of the State’s lower house, the House of Assembly in the Parliament of South Australia. Originally, these redistributions were to take place after five or more years had elapsed between two general elections held on the same boundaries. After a change to 4 year terms occurred in 1985, this was seen as insufficient and in 1991, following a referendum, this was changed so that redistributions take place following each general election.

When making a redistribution, the Commission is required to ensure that the number of electors in each electoral district does not vary from the electoral quota by more than a permissible tolerance of 10 per cent. The electoral quota is determined by dividing the total number of electors as at the relevant date by the number of electoral districts into which the State is divided. Since 1969 this number has been 47.

The Commission must also have regard to matters which are outlined in section 83(2) of the Constitution Act 1934 (SA), being:

- The desirability of making the electoral redistribution so as to reflect communities of interest of an economic, social, regional or other kind
- The population of each proposed electoral district
- The topography of areas within which new electoral boundaries will be drawn
- The feasibility of communication between electors affected by the redistribution and their parliamentary representative in the House of Assembly
- The nature of substantial demographic changes that the EDBC considers likely to take place in proposed electoral districts between the conclusion of its present proceedings and the next State election
- Any other matter the EDBC thinks relevant.

Following a referendum, between 1991 and 2016 the Boundaries Commission was also required to have ensured, as far as practicable, that the redistribution was fair to prospective candidates and groups of candidates, so that if candidates of a particular group attracted more than 50 per cent of the popular vote, including preferences, they would be elected in sufficient numbers to enable a government to be formed. This “fairness” criterion was unique to South Australia and was repealed by the Australian Labor Party government of Jay Weatherill in 2017.

== Membership ==
The Electoral Districts Boundaries Commission consists of 3 members: A chairperson who is the most senior puisne Judge of the Supreme Court of South Australia appointed by the Chief Justice, the Electoral Commissioner of the Electoral Commission of South Australia and the Surveyor General of South Australia.
