= State constitutions in Australia =

List of Australian state constitutions

State constitutions in Australia are the legal documents that establish and define the structure, powers, and functions of the six state governments in Australia.

Each state constitution preceded the federal Constitution of Australia as the constitutions of the then six self-governing colonies. Upon federation in 1901, the states ceded certain powers to the federal government.

Each state has its own constitution, which serves as a foundational legal document to govern the state's legislative, executive, and judicial branches. These constitutions are separate from the Australian Constitution, which governs the federal government of Australia and is also the relevant constitutional document for each of Australia's territories.

== Overview ==
Australia operates as a federal parliamentary democratic constitutional monarchy, with the monarch, currently King Charles III, as the head of state. The state governments function within the framework of a federal system, where powers are divided between the federal government and state governments. While there are some similarities among the state constitutions, each state has its unique provisions and structures. Generally, state constitutions establish a system of responsible government, where the executive is accountable to the legislative branch.

In Australia, State constitutions do not meaningfully limit the power of State parliaments. Each of Australia's State parliaments is understood to have been vested with plenary power; additionally, their constitutions can be altered by simple acts of the State legislature. In this respect, they may be understood as sovereign legislatures exclusively at the State level. They are not truly sovereign legislatures however, as laws passed by Australia's state parliaments are subject to the federal constitution. (see for example Section 92 and 109)

This situation may be contrasted with the constitutional arrangements of other state-level governments in other federalist jurisdictions; like that of Texas, a jurisdiction where the constitutional arrangements only provide the legislature with powers explicitly granted to it within the state's constitutional document.

== Constitutional Reform and Amendments ==
The process for amending state constitutions in Australia varies by state. Generally, amendments require a majority vote in both houses of parliament, and sometimes approval through a state-wide referendum. However, some states have different amendment procedures, and not all changes require a referendum. However, in theory, procedural restrictions can be removed by the State parliaments through simple legislative acts. They therefore do not bind State parliaments to the same degree that the Commonwealth constitution binds the Australian Government.

Constitutional reform and amendments at the State level have been a source of discussion for legal scholars, politicians, and the general public. Issues discussed in debates about reform have included the role of the monarchy, rights and recognition for Indigenous Australians, and human rights.

An example of this is the November 6, 1999 referendum.

== List of constitutions ==
The following is a list of the current constitutions of the six states of Australia. Each entry shows the ordinal number of the current constitution, the official name of the current constitution, and the date on which the current constitution took effect.

No.	State	Date of effect	Notes
2nd	Constitution of New South Wales	1902	
2nd	Constitution of Queensland	2001	
2nd	Constitution of South Australia	1934	
2nd	Constitution of Tasmania	1934	
2nd	Constitution of Victoria	1975	
1st	Constitution of Western Australia	1890	

== See also ==
- State constitution (United States)
