= 1978 New South Wales referendum =

Constitutional Referendum

1978 New South Wales Direct Election of the Legislative Council referendum,
- 27 June 1978
- Do you approve of the Bill entitled — "A Bill for an Act to provide for the election of members of the Legislative Council directly by the people" ?

Results
Choice	Votes	%
Yes	2,251,336	84.81%
No	403,313	15.19%
Valid votes	2,654,649	97.44%
Invalid or blank votes	69,727	2.56%
Total votes	2,724,376	100.00%
Registered voters/turnout	3,085,661	88.29%

The 1978 New South Wales referendum was held on 17 June 1978 and contained a single question:

Do you approve of the Bill entitled 'A Bill for an Act to provide for the election of members of the Legislative Council directly by the people'.

== Background ==
The Lang Labor government unsuccessfully attempted to abolish the Legislative Council in 1925 and 1930. In 1961 a referendum to abolish the council was put to New South Wales voters however it was defeated with only 42% support.

== Amendments to the constitution ==
The headline change by the proposal was to alter the Constitution Act 1902 to provide for the members of the Legislative Council to be directly elected. The proposal included other changes, being:

- a reduction in the number of members from 60 to 43, increasing to 44 and then 45;
- Elections for the council to be held simultaneously with elections for the Legislative Assembly;
- The term of members being reduced from a fixed 12 years to a maximum of 9 years; and
- A third of members being elected at each election, rather than the previous quarter.

The transitional arrangements were that the members whose terms were due to expire in 1979 or 1982 had their terms expire at the next general election, held in 1978, those members whose terms were to expire in 1985 would retire at the second general election, held in 1981, and those members whose terms were to expire in 1988 would retire at the third general election, held in 1984.

== Results ==
The question was approved with a large majority.

Result
Question		Votes	%
Direct election of the Legislative Council	Yes	2,251,336	84.81
Direct election of the Legislative Council	No	403,313	15.19
Total Formal		2,654,649	97.44
Informal		69,727	2.56
Turnout		2,724,376	88.29

== Legislative Council referendums ==
This was the third referendum in New South Wales on the subject of the Legislative Council.

Legislative Council referendums
Referendum	Yes	No
(4) 1933 reform Legislative Council	51.47%	48.53%
(7) 1961 abolish Legislative Council	42.42%	57.58%
(11) 1978 directly elect Legislative Council	84.81%	15.19%
(14) 1991 reduce size of Legislative Council	57.73%	42.27%

== See also ==
- Referendums in New South Wales
- Referendums in Australia
