= List of acts of the Parliament of South Australia from 1838 =

This is a list of acts of the Parliament of South Australia for the year 1838.

== 1838 ==
| Short title, or popular name | Citation | Royal assent |
Long title
| Ports and Harbours Act 1838 | 1 Vict. No. 3 | 22 February 1838 |
As Act for the better preservation of the Ports, Harbors, Havens, Roadsteads, Channels, Navigable Creeks, and Rivers, in Her Majesty's Province of South Australia; and for the better regulation of Shipping and their Crews in the same.
| Duties on Wines, &c. Act 1838 | 1 Vict. No. 4 | 25 April 1838 |
An Act to impose certain Duties on Wines, Spirits, and Tobacco; to provide for the Warehousing, and to prevent the clandestine removal and importation of the same.
| Duties on Wines, &c. (No. 2) Act 1838 | 2 Vict. No. 1 (Note: This citation was also used for the first act of 1839.) | 11 July 1838 |
An Act to rectify a clerical error in the Act (Note: Duties on Wines, &c. Act 1838 (1 Vict. No. 4)) lately passed for imposing certain duties upon Wines, Spirits, and Tobacco.

== Sources ==
- "1838 South Australia Numbered Acts". AustLii.
