= List of acts of the Parliament of South Australia from 1839 =

This is a list of acts of the Parliament of South Australia for the year 1839.

== 1839 ==
Short title, or popular name	Citation	Royal assent
Long title
Licensing Act 1839	2 Vict. No. 1 (Note: This citation was also used for the last act of 1838.)	21 February 1839
An Act to regulate the Retail of Liquors, and to preserve good Order in Licensed Public Houses.
Licensing Act 1839	2 Vict. No. 2	15 April 1839
An Act to supply Omissions and rectify a clerical Error in the Act (Note: Licensing Act 1837 (7 Will. IV. No. 4)) lately passed for regulate the Retail of Liquors, and for preserving good Order in Licensed Public Houses.
Duties on Wheat, &c. Act 1839	3 Vict. No. 3	7 September 1839
An Act to impose certain Rates and Duties upon Wheat and other Grain Flour Meal and Biscuit exported from the Province of South Australia and to prevent the clandestine Exportation of the same.
Naturalization Act 1839	3 Vict. No. 4	11 September 1839
An Act for the Naturalization of certain Persons Natives of Germany.
Convicts Apprehension Act 1839	3 Vict. No. 5	17 September 1839
An Act to facilitate the Apprehension in South Australia of Convicts escaping from the neighboring Penal Settlements.
Police Act 1839	3 Vict. No. 6	11 October 1839
An Act for Raising and Organising a Police Force for the Province of South Australia.
General Post Office Act 1839	3 Vict. No. 7	15 October 1839
An Act to provide for the better Regulation of the General Post Office and the Conveyance and Postage of Letters.
Entire Horses Act 1839	3 Vict. No. 8	17 September 1839
An Act to prevent Entire Horses being suffered to stray or run at large.

== Sources ==
- "1839 South Australia Numbered Acts". AustLii.
