= 1991 South Australian electoral boundaries referendum =

- 9 February 1991

Results
Choice	Votes	%
Yes	649,906	76.72%
No	197,244	23.28%
Valid votes	847,150	95.98%
Invalid or blank votes	35,500	4.02%
Total votes	882,650	100.00%
Registered voters/turnout	981,344	89.94%

A referendum on electoral redistributions in South Australia was held on 9 February 1991. The proposal put to voters would require the South Australian Electoral Districts Boundaries Commission to redistribute the electoral boundaries following every election, and to consider a broader range of criteria when reviewing boundaries: specifically, "to draw the boundaries in such a way that the party with the majority of (the two-party) vote would also win the majority of seats and so be able to form government". The proposals were accepted by a wide margin.

As of 2026, this is the most recent South Australian state referendum.

== Results ==
South Australian electoral redistribution referendum, 1991
Choice	Votes	%
Yes	649,906	76.72
No	197,244	23.28
Total	847,150	100.00
Valid votes	847,150	95.98
Invalid/blank votes	35,500	4.02
Total votes	882,650	100.00
Registered voters/turnout	981,344	89.94
