= 1961 New South Wales referendum =

- 29 April 1961
- Do you approve of the Bill entitled— "A Bill for an Act to Abolish the Legislative Council to provide that another Legislative Council shall not be created, constituted or established nor shall any Chamber, Assembly or House, other than the Legislative Assembly, designed to form part of the Legislative Parliament of New South Wales, be created, constituted or established until a bill for the purpose has been approved by the electors in a referendum to amend the Constitution Act, 1902 and certain other Acts; and for purposes connected therewith." ?

Results
Choice	Votes	%
Yes	802,512	42.42%
No	1,089,193	57.58%
Valid votes	1,891,705	97.46%
Invalid or blank votes	49,352	2.54%
Total votes	1,941,057	100.00%
Registered voters/turnout	2,075,268	93.53%

A referendum concerning the abolition of the New South Wales Legislative Council was put to New South Wales voters on 29 April 1961. The abolition was specifically rejected by voters. The text of the question was:

Do you approve of the Bill entitled "A Bill for an Act to Abolish the Legislative Council to provide that another Legislative Council shall not be created, constituted or established nor shall any Chamber, Assembly or House, other than the Legislative Assembly, designed to form part of the Legislative Parliament of New South Wales, be created, constituted or established until a bill for the purpose has been approved by the electors in a referendum to amend the Constitution Act, 1902 and certain other Acts; and for purposes connected therewith."

== Background ==
The abolition of the New South Wales Legislative Council had been on the Labor Party agenda since at least federation. However, attempts to abolish the Council did not occur until Labor Premier Jack Lang's first term of office from 1925 to 1927. His inability to gain control in the upper house obstructed Lang's legislative programme and in November 1930, claiming a mandate to abolish the council, Labor MLCs put forward two bills, one to repeal section 7A of the NSW Constitution (which prevented the abolition of the Council without a referendum), the other to abolish the council. Lang requested the necessary additional appointments to pass the legislation from the Governor. However, these requests were refused by De Chair's successor, Sir Philip Game.

Believing that a referendum was necessary before the bills could become law, the Legislative Council permitted the bills to pass without a division on 10 December. Lang then announced his intention of presenting the bills for Game's royal assent without a referendum. The following day, two members of the Legislative Council, Thomas Playfair and Arthur Trethowan, applied for and were granted an injunction preventing the President of the council, Sir John Peden, and the ministers from presenting the bills to the Governor without having held a referendum. On 23 December the Supreme Court of New South Wales in the case of Trethowan v Peden, upheld the injunction and ordered the government not to present bills to abolish the council for royal assent, unless ratified by the electors in a referendum. Lang immediately prepared an appeal to the High Court of Australia. In the case of Attorney-General (New South Wales) v Trethowan, the appeal was rejected by a majority of the court. Lang then appealed this decision to the Judicial Committee of the Privy Council in London. The Privy Council then delayed the appeal until April 1932. The appeal was finally resolved with the judgment of the Judicial Committee of the Privy Council on 31 May 1932. The judgment dismissed the appeal by the Government of New South Wales. The bills repealing Section 7A and abolishing the Legislative Council could not therefore be presented to the Governor for assent until they had been passed in a referendum. Faced with other problems, Lang's plans for abolition ultimately failed. His successor as Premier, Bertram Stevens, later passed major reforms to replace the appointed Legislative Council, by a Council elected by the whole parliament to terms equivalent to four Assembly terms. This was passed by referendum in 1933.

However upon Robert Heffron's elevation as premier in 1959, which followed an approved motion from the 1958 state conference, Heffron reanimated the longstanding Labor policy to abolish the Legislative Council of New South Wales by announcing a statewide referendum on this question. Heffron had long supported this policy from his Langite days, seeing the council as an outdated bastion of conservative privilege, a position that was echoed by trade union official and member of the Legislative Council, Tom Dougherty, who had pushed through a rule at the 1952 state conference that banned MLCs from becoming members of the state party executive. However, Heffron's efforts found themselves up against significant opposition, not only from the Liberal and Country parties but also within the Labor party itself. Indeed, when the 'Constitution Amendment (Legislative Council Abolition) Bill' came before the Legislative Council on 2 December 1959, the council resolved 33 votes to 25 to send it back to the Legislative Assembly on the grounds that such a bill should have originated in the council. This was passed with the support of seven Labor councillors crossing the floor (including Cyril Cahill, Anne Press and Donald Cochrane), who were all subsequently expelled from the party.

On 6 April 1960, Heffron attempted to send the bill back to the council, which returned it to the assembly on the same grounds as before. As a result of the deadlock, Heffron requested the Governor to order a joint session of parliament on 20 April, a session which lasted two hours and was boycotted by the opposition. On 12 May the Assembly resolved that the bill be submitted for a referendum. However, later that day the leader of the opposition in the Legislative Council, Hector Clayton, started legal action against the government on the grounds that under section 5B of the NSW Constitution, the council had neither voted nor deliberated on the bill and thus the bill could not be submitted for a referendum. In the case of Clayton v. Heffron (1960) the full bench of the Supreme Court of New South Wales found in favour of the government on the grounds that they had complied fully with the intention of section 5B, while the High Court denied the plaintiff special leave to appeal. In January 1961, Heffron announced the date of the referendum for 29 April 1961. However, despite the lack of time allocated for a campaign, the Liberal/Country opposition led by Robert Askin spearheaded a strong campaign centred on warnings of a Labor-dominated single house subject to "Communist and Trades Hall influence".

== Results ==
The referendum was resolved in the negative, defeating the long-held Labor policy to abolish the council.

Result
Question		Votes	%
Legislative Council abolition	Yes	802,512	42.42
Legislative Council abolition	No	1,089,193	57.58
Total Formal		1,891,705	97.46
Informal		49,352	2.54
Turnout		1,941,057	93.53

== Aftermath ==
This would be the last attempt to abolish the council and, as the first time the NSW Labor party had lost a state poll in many years, was widely seen as the beginning of the end for the Labor government, which had been in power since 1941. Heffron's supporter Dougherty resigned from the council a month later in protest at the result. The referendum, while defeated, sparked discussion on future reform of the then indirectly elected Council, culminating in the 1978 referendum which overwhelmingly endorsed the reforms proposed by the Neville Wran Labor Government including the direct election of members. Since these reforms removed many of the arguments against the upper house, another question on abolition is unlikely.

Legislative Council referendums
Referendum	Yes	No
(4) 1933 reform Legislative Council	51.47%	48.53%
(7) 1961 abolish Legislative Council	42.42%	57.58%
(11) 1978 directly elect Legislative Council	84.81%	15.19%
(14) 1991 reduce size of Legislative Council	57.73%	42.27%

== See also ==
- Referendums in New South Wales
- Referendums in Australia
