= 1933 New South Wales referendum =

- 13 May 1933
- Do you approve of the Bill entitled — "A Bill to reform the constitution and alter the Powers of the Legislative Council; to reduce and limit the number of Members of the Legislative Council; to reconstitute the Legislative Council in accordance with the reformed constitution; to amend the Constitution Act, 1902, and certain other Acts; and for purposes connected therewith" ?

Results
Choice	Votes	%
Yes	716,938	51.47%
No	676,034	48.53%
Valid votes	1,392,972	98.71%
Invalid or blank votes	18,144	1.29%
Total votes	1,411,116	100.00%
Registered voters/turnout	1,465,008	96.32%

A referendum concerning the reform of the New South Wales Legislative Council was put to New South Wales voters on 13 May 1933 and was passed by the voters with a margin of 2.94%. The text of the question was:

Do you approve of the Bill entitled "A Bill to reform the constitution and alter the Powers of the Legislative Council; to reduce and limit the number of Members of the Legislative Council; to reconstitute the Legislative Council in accordance with the reformed constitution; to amend the Constitution Act, 1902, and certain other Acts; and for purposes connected therewith."

== Background ==
The abolition of the New South Wales Legislative Council had been on the Labor Party agenda since at least federation. However, attempts to abolish the Council did not occur until Labor Premier Jack Lang’s first term of office, however the attempt failed when 2 Labor members voted against the abolition bill and a further 6 were absent from the council. Lang was defeated at the 1927 election and in 1929 the parliament passed an amendment to the Constitution Act which inserted section 7A, requiring a referendum before the Legislative Council could be abolished. In 1930 Labor MLCs put forward two bills, one to repeal section 7A, the other to abolish the Council. Believing that a referendum was necessary before the bills could become law, the Legislative Council permitted the bills to pass without a division on 10 December. The validity of section 7A and the inability to repeal the section without a referendum were upheld by the Supreme Court on 23 December 1930, a majority of the High Court on 16 March 1931, and the Judicial Committee of the Privy Council on 31 May 1932. The bills repealing Section 7A and abolishing the Legislative Council could not therefore be presented to the Governor for assent until they had been passed in a referendum. Lang was dismissed in May 1932 and the United Australia Party led by Bertram Stevens, in coalition with the Country Party had a landslide victory at the 1932 election, winning 66 of the 90 seats, with 51.62% of the primary vote.

The number of members of the council had expanded significantly, from 75 on 24 June 1925 to a peak of 125 in September 1932. The response of Stevens was to propose major reforms, replacing the appointed council with one indirectly elected to 12 year terms and reducing the number to 60.

== Yes case ==
A statement issued by the Stevens government stated that the most important provisions of the proposal were to:

1. Reduce and limit the number of members to sixty.
2. Provide for an elective Instead of a nominee Chamber, the members to be elected by both Houses as one electoral body in accordance with the principle of proportional representation, to hold office for a specified term instead of for life, and to retire under a system of rotation.
3. Define the powers of the new Council, and place all bills on the same footing, with the exception of the usual "supply bills" for the ordinary services of government.
4. Adopt the principle of the referendum in order that the electors themselves may decide questions upon which the two Houses, after full opportunity to discuss the issues Involved and to arrive at agreement by constitutional methods, may still be at variance.

In response to Labor's assertion that the council could block its abolition Henry Manning, the Attorney General stated that the council could neither veto nor obstruct with success. There was no basis for the claim that an abolition bill could only originate in the council.

== No case ==
The proposal was opposed by both Lang Labor and Federal Labor. Lang, in opening his no campaign, described the reform bill as a plot to install the fascist New Guard in charge of parliament, and that there would be no referendum to abolish the council as the Governor or the council could obstruct the proposal by refusing to cooperate with the deadlock provisions. James Scullin, leader of the federal party, stated that the proposal was a violation of democratic principle and that it was the right of the people to elect their representatives. Scullin reiterated Labor's policy of abolishing all legislative councils.

On a practical level the United Australia Party had a majority in both houses such that they would have a majority in the reformed council and the influence of that majority would continue for many years, with Scullin describing it as a scheme to entrench one party in power. The Australian Worker described it as loaded against Labor and "a scheme to keep Labor legislation off the statute book for the next 20 years or more.

== Results ==
Result
Question		Votes	%
Legislative Council reform	Yes	716,938	51.47
Legislative Council reform	No	676,034	48.53
Total Formal		1,392,972	98.71
Informal		18,144	1.29
Turnout		1,411,116	96.32

== Aftermath ==
=== Court challenge ===
The referendum was challenged on the basis that copies of the Bill were not given or made available to electors. The Full Court of the Supreme Court, Harvey Chief Judge in Equity, Justice Long Innes and Justice Davidson rejected the contention that submitting the bill to the electors meant handing a copy to each elector, holding that it merely meant that there should be a vote of electors. The court also rejected a contention that the 1929 bill for the reform of the council and the 1930 bill for the abolition of the council had to be submitted at the same time.

=== 1934 Legislative Council election ===
The election was held at a joint sitting of parliament in November 1933 with the United Australia and Country coalition winning 35 of the 60 seats.

Party	Seats
United Australia	24
Country	11
Coalition total	35
Labor (NSW)	17
Federal Labor	5
Independent	3

== Subsequent referendums ==
The Labor party's platform of abolishing the legislative council was put to a referendum in 1961, but not until after significant opposition, not only from the Liberal and Country parties but also within the Labor party itself. Despite the views of Henry Manning in 1933 when the 'Constitution Amendment (Legislative Council Abolition) Bill' came before the Legislative Council on 2 December 1959, the council resolved 33 votes to 25 to send it back to the Legislative Assembly on the grounds that such a bill should have originated in the council. This was passed with the support of seven Labor members crossing the floor. On 6 April 1960 the bill was sent back to the council, which returned it to the assembly on the same grounds.

As a result of the deadlock, Heffron requested the Governor to order a joint session of parliament on 20 April, a session which lasted two hours and was boycotted by the opposition. On 12 May the Assembly resolved that the bill be submitted for a referendum. However, later that day the leader of the opposition in the Legislative Council, Hector Clayton, started legal action seeking to prevent a referendum. As Manning had stated, the council could neither veto nor obstruct the referendum with success. The full court of the Supreme Court of New South Wales found that the government had complied fully with the intention of section 5B, while the High Court denied the plaintiff special leave to appeal. In January 1961, Heffron announced the date of the referendum for 29 April 1961. However, despite the lack of time allocated for a campaign, the Liberal/Country opposition led by Robert Askin spearheaded a strong campaign centred on warnings of a Labor-dominated single house subject to "Communist and Trades Hall influence". As a result, the referendum on 29 April was categorically rejected with 802,512 votes (42.4%) for abolition and 1,089,193 votes (57.5%) against.

The referendum, while defeated, sparked discussion on future reform of the then indirectly elected Council, culminating in the 1978 referendum which overwhelmingly endorsed the reforms proposed by the Neville Wran Labor government including the direct election of members. Since these reforms removed many of the arguments against the upper house, another question on abolition is unlikely.

Legislative Council referendums
Referendum	Yes	No
(4) 1933 reform Legislative Council	51.47%	48.53%
(7) 1961 abolish Legislative Council	42.42%	57.58%
(11) 1978 directly elect Legislative Council	84.81%	15.19%
(14) 1991 reduce size of Legislative Council	57.73%	42.27%

== See also ==
- Referendums in New South Wales
- Referendums in Australia
