= List of acts of the Parliament of South Australia from 1837 =

This is a list of acts of the Parliament of South Australia for the year 1837.

== 1837 ==
Short title, or popular name	Citation	Royal assent
Long title
Courts of Sessions Act 1837	7 Will. IV. No. 1	2 January 1837
An Act for the Establishment of Courts of General or Quarter and Petty Sessions in His Majesty's Province of South Australia.
Juries Act 1837	7 Will. IV. No. 2	2 January 1837
An Act for fixing the Qualification of Jurors.
Masters and Servants Act 1837	7 Will. IV. No. 3	4 January 1837
An Act for the summary determination of all disputes between Master and Servant.
Licensing Act 1837	7 Will. IV. No. 4	2 February 1837
An Act for the granting of Licences, and the regulating the sale of Wine, Beer, and Spirituous Liquors, and for the prevention of Drunkenness, and the promoting of good order in Public Houses.
Supreme Court Act 1837	7 Will. IV. No. 5	31 May 1873
An Act for the Establishment of a Court to be called the Supreme Court of the Province of South Australia.
Juries (No. 2) Act 1837	1 Vict. No. 1	15 November 1837
An Act for Regulating the Constitution of Juries.
Magistrates and Justices Act 1837	1 Vict. No. 2	17 November 1837
An Act to establish Courts of Resident Magistrates to appoint Resident Magistrates to confer on Justices of the Peace certain Powers until such Resident Magistrates be appointed to provide for the Recovery of small Debts and the Punishment of certain Offences within the Province of South Australia.

== Sources ==
- "1837 South Australia Numbered Acts". AustLii.
