= Australian Constitutions Act 1850 =

Act of the Parliament of the United Kingdom establishing the Colony of Victoria

Australian Constitutions Act 1850 (Note: The citation of this act by this short title was authorised by section 1 of, and the first schedule to, the Short Titles Act 1896. Due to the repeal of those provisions it is now authorised by section 19(2) of the Interpretation Act 1978.)
- Act of Parliament
- Parliament of the United Kingdom
- Long title: An Act for the better Government of Her Majesty's Australian Colonies.
- Citation: 13 & 14 Vict. c. 59
- Territorial extent: United Kingdom; Australia

Dates
- Royal assent: 5 August 1850
- Commencement: 1 July 1851 (Note: Section 38.)
- Repealed: 3 March 1986 (Note: The Australia Act 1986 (Commencement) Order 1986 (SI 1986/319).)
Other legislation
Amended by	Statute Law Revision Act 1878
Repealed by	New South Wales Constitution Act 1855; Victoria Constitution Act 1855; Western Australia Constitution Act 1890; Australia Act 1986

Status: Repealed

Text of statute as originally enacted

The Australian Constitutions Act 1850 (13 & 14 Vict. c. 59), or the Australian Colonies Government Act 1850, was an act of the Parliament of the United Kingdom which was enacted to formally establish the Colony of Victoria by separating the District of Port Phillip from the Colony of New South Wales. The act provided an initial constitution for Victoria, which included a bicameral parliament and a Lieutenant-Governor as its vice-regal representative. It also altered the constitution of the Colony of New South Wales, and provided for similar constitutions to be set up in Van Diemen's Land (Tasmania) and South Australia.

It was given royal assent on 5 August 1850 and came into effect on 1 July 1851. The act received criticism in Australia for its perceived inadequacies, spearheaded in the New South Wales Legislative Council by the statesman William Wentworth.

== Background ==
The act was a response to the demands of the Port Phillip and Moreton Bay settlers, who felt inadequately represented in the New South Wales Legislative Council and who resented their taxes being channelled to New South Wales.

== The act ==
The act named the colony and set out its provisional constitution, which included the proviso of a bicameral parliament. It created the Parliament of Victoria, which initially consisted of the Victorian Legislative Council of 20 elected members and 10 members appointed by the Lieutenant Governor. This body was given jurisdiction over all but Australian lands and could pass any legislation not in conflict with the extant English laws. The act provided that the current arrangements would continue either until a charter of justice were issued, or until legislation was passed by the Victorian Legislative Council. Earl Grey, the British Secretary of State for War from 1846 to 1852, helped the passage of the bill through Parliament, as he wished to promote free trade and federal system of government in the colonies.

The act also provided for similar constitutions to be applied to Van Diemen's Land and South Australia, enabling the creation of new Australian colonies with a similar form of government to New South Wales, whose constitution it also altered. It changed the qualifications for franchise for the New South Wales Legislative Council, and enabled this body, together with the Governor of New South Wales, to establish a bicameral parliament.

The act, thus, had significant impact on the four colonies that were already established. The Colony of Western Australia had just started receiving convicts, making it the last remaining penal colony, and the act included special provisions which limited the rights of its citizens to participate in government.

== Response ==
In April 1851, William Wentworth established a committee to formulate a motion against the perceived inadequacies of the act. The "Declaration and Remonstrance" declared, among other things, that "the Imperial Parliament has not, nor of right ought to have any power to tax the people of this Colony", and that "plenary powers of legislation should be conferred upon and exercised by the Colonial Legislature ... [and] no bills should be reserved" for the Imperial Parliament unless they affected the Empire. Sir Henry Parkes later wrote of Wentworth that "His Declaration and Remonstrance is so important as one of the foundation-stones of the fabric of our constitutional liberties."

== Subsequent developments ==
The whole act was repealed by section 11(3) of the Australia Act 1986, which came into force on 3 March 1986.
