= 1928 New South Wales prohibition referendum =

1928 New South Wales referendum
Prohibition with compensation	Vote
Yes	29%
No	71%

A referendum concerning introducing prohibition in New South Wales was put to voters on 1 September 1928.

== Background ==
Six o'clock closing was introduced during the First World War, partly as an attempt to improve public morality and partly as a war austerity measure. Before this reform, most hotels and public houses in Australia closed their bars at 11 or 11:30 pm. Support for changing hotel closing times originally came from the temperance movement, which hoped that implementing restrictions on the sale of alcohol would lead eventually to its total prohibition. Although the movement had been active since the 1870s, it had been gaining ground since the 1900s following the introduction of 6 o'clock retail trade closing, first legislated in Western Australia in 1897. The argument made by the temperance movement challenged the grounds for public houses being "kept open while bakers' shops were shut". Prominent groups in this movement were the Woman's Christian Temperance Union and the Rechabites. Their agitation was augmented with the outbreak of war in 1914 where it was argued that a "well-ordered, self-disciplined and morally upright home front was a precondition for the successful prosecution of the war."

The first state to introduce early closing was South Australia in March 1916 where the rationale was to reduce drunkenness, and followed a widely subscribed petition. The Council of Churches urged such a measure in support of the war effort, but premier Peake, a teetotal Presbyterian, refused. Such a law was approved in a referendum held in conjunction with the 1915 state election. Six o'clock closing was subsequently adopted in New South Wales, Victoria, and Tasmania in the same year. It was introduced in New Zealand in December 1917. Western Australia adopted a 9 pm closing time, but Queensland retained the old closing times until it introduced 8 o'clock closing in 1923.

The question of closing hours was put to New South Wales voters in a referendum held on 10 June 1916. The question had previously been put to the vote in December 1913 when the results of the Local Option Poll were in favour of 11 o'clock closing. The 1916 vote was influenced by a recent riot involving drunken soldiers. In February 1916, troops mutinied against conditions at the Casula Camp. They raided hotels in Liverpool before travelling by train to Sydney, where one soldier was shot dead in a riot at Central Railway station.

Although 6 o'clock closing was introduced as a temporary measure, the government brought in extensions and discussed putting the matter to a referendum. In 1923, however, without testing the matter by a popular vote, the Fuller Nationalist government enacted 6 pm as the closing time.

== The question ==
The question to be voted on was whether "prohibition, with compensation, shall come into force throughout New South Wales".

== Results ==
The referendum overwhelmingly rejected the introduction of prohibition.

Result
Question		Votes	%
Are you in favour of Prohibition with Compensation?	Yes	357,684	28.74
Are you in favour of Prohibition with Compensation?	No	896,752	71.26
Total formal votes		1,254,436	98.92
Informal votes		13,683	1.08
Turnout		1,268,119	89.97

== Aftermath ==
This was the second of 5 referendums concerning the sale of alcohol in New South Wales, 3 of which dealt with the closing hour for licensed premises and clubs while the fifth concerned Sunday trading.

Closing hour referendum results
Referendum	6:00 pm	7:00 pm	8:00 pm	9:00 pm	10:00 pm	11:00 pm
(2) 1916 Licensed premises closing hour	62.18%	0.97%	3.84%	32.16%	0.29%	0.56%
(5) 1947 Licensed premises and clubs closing hour	62.44%			1.60%	35.96%	
(6) 1954 Licensed premises and clubs closing hour	49.73%				50.27%	

== See also ==
- Referendums in New South Wales
- Referendums in Australia
