= 1969 New South Wales Sunday trading referendum =

29 November 1969
- By law, resident hotel guests, bona fide travellers and club members may drink liquor on licensed premises at any hour on Sundays. Do you favour the law being amended to permit hotels to trade generally on Sundays between the hours of 12 noon and 6.30 p.m.?

Results
Choice	Votes	%
Yes	906,276	42.03%
No	1,249,835	57.97%
Valid votes	2,156,111	95.75%
Invalid or blank votes	95,716	4.25%
Total votes	2,251,827	100.00%
Registered voters/turnout	2,356,977	95.54%

A referendum concerning whether hotels should be allowed to trade on Sundays was put to voters in New South Wales on 29 November 1969 but was unsuccessful.

== Background ==
Sunday trading by public houses or hotels had been restricted in NSW since at least 1825. The Licensed Publicans Act 1849 permitted hotels to be open from 4:00 am until 10:00 pm from 1 October to 31 March and from 6:00 am to 10:00 pm from 1 April to 30 September and they could not open on Sunday, Good Friday or Christmas Day. Hotels were required to have accommodation of at least 2 bedrooms and stables for at least 6 horses and the trading restrictions did not apply to serving bona fide lodgers, inmates (Note: In the sense of "club member", not "patient" or "prisoner".) or travellers. Hotels were prohibited from serving "Aboriginal natives".

Sunday trading was introduced in 1862, from 1:00 pm to 3:00 pm and at the same time trading on the other six days was 4:00 am to midnight. Trading remained prohibited on Good Friday and Christmas. The accommodation requirements and the exception for serving lodgers, inmates and travellers remained. Music or dancing was not permitted without special permission.

Licensing laws were substantially changed in 1882 and 1883, requiring hotels not to open before 6:00 am, to close by 11:00 pm, Monday to Saturday closed on Sunday. Music and dancing remained banned without special permission and women who were not married or widowed were expressly prohibited from obtaining a licence. A new restriction on hotel licences was that any proposal to increase their number required approval from the majority of ratepayers in the municipality, referred to as the "local option". A related change was to accommodation, increasing the requirement to at least 4 bedrooms, with 9 foot (2.7 m) ceilings and 1,200 cubic feet (34 m^{3}) of airspace. (Note: A room that was 11 feet (3.4 m) wide with 9 foot (2.7 m) ceilings would need to be 12 feet 1 inch (3.68 m) long to have the required airspace.) If the hotel had an extra 20 bedrooms it could be granted a licence despite the result of any local option.

Six o'clock closing, leading to the six o'clock swill, had been introduced in NSW as a temporary measure following the 1916 referendum and was not abolished until the 1954 referendum.

On 2 October 1947 the Supreme Court held that the members of a registered club, the Royal Sydney Golf Club, were inmates within the meaning of s. 57 of the Liquor Act 1912, and consequently were exempt from the ban on Sunday trading.

== The question ==
The voting paper contained the following directions to the elector:

By law, resident hotel guests, bona fide travellers and club members may drink liquor on licensed premises at any hour on Sundays.

Do you favour the law being amended to permit hotels to trade generally on Sundays between the hours of 12 noon and 6.30 p.m.?

1. If in favour place the figure "1" in the square opposite "Yes" and the figure "2" in the square opposite "No".

2. If not in favour place the figure "1" in the square opposite "No" and the figure "2" in the square opposite "Yes".

== Results ==
The referendum rejected Sunday trading.

Result
Question		Votes	%
Sunday trading	Yes	906,276	42.03
Sunday trading	No	1,249,835	57.97
Total Formal		2,156,111	95.75
Informal		95,716	4.25
Turnout		2,251,827	95.54

== Alcohol referendums ==
This was fifth referendum concerning the sale of alcohol in New South Wales, 3 of which dealt with the closing hour for licensed premises and clubs while the other concerned prohibition.

Closing hour referendum results
Referendum	6:00 pm	7:00 pm	8:00 pm	9:00 pm	10:00 pm	11:00 pm
(2) 1916 Licensed premises closing hour	62.18%	0.97%	3.84%	32.16%	0.29%	0.56%
(5) 1947 Licensed premises and clubs closing hour	62.44%			1.60%	35.96%	
(6) 1954 Licensed premises and clubs closing hour	49.73%				50.27%	

== See also ==
- Referendums in New South Wales
- Referendums in Australia
