= Pubs in Australia =

Australian venue licensed to serve alcohol

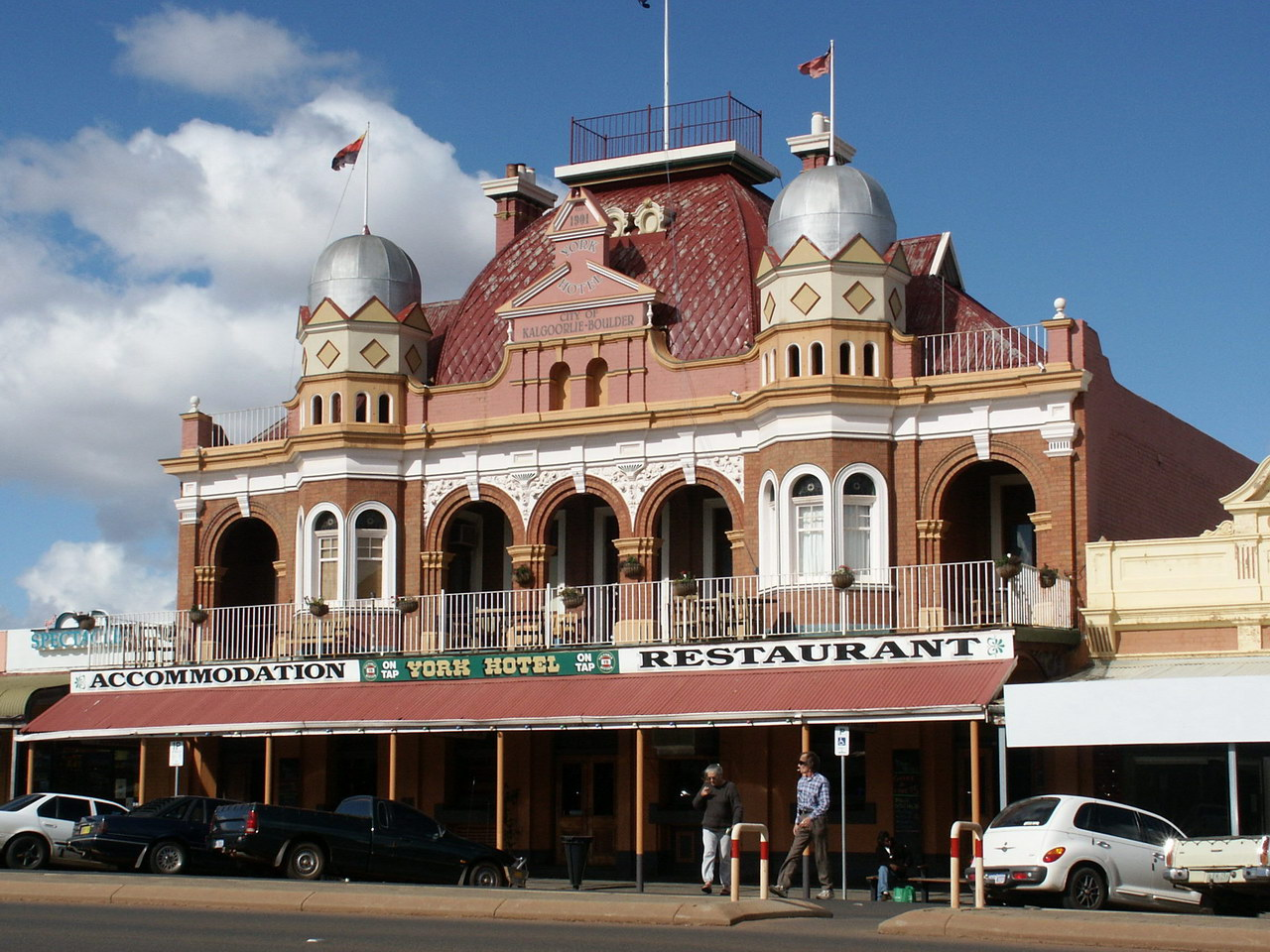
York Hotel in Kalgoorlie

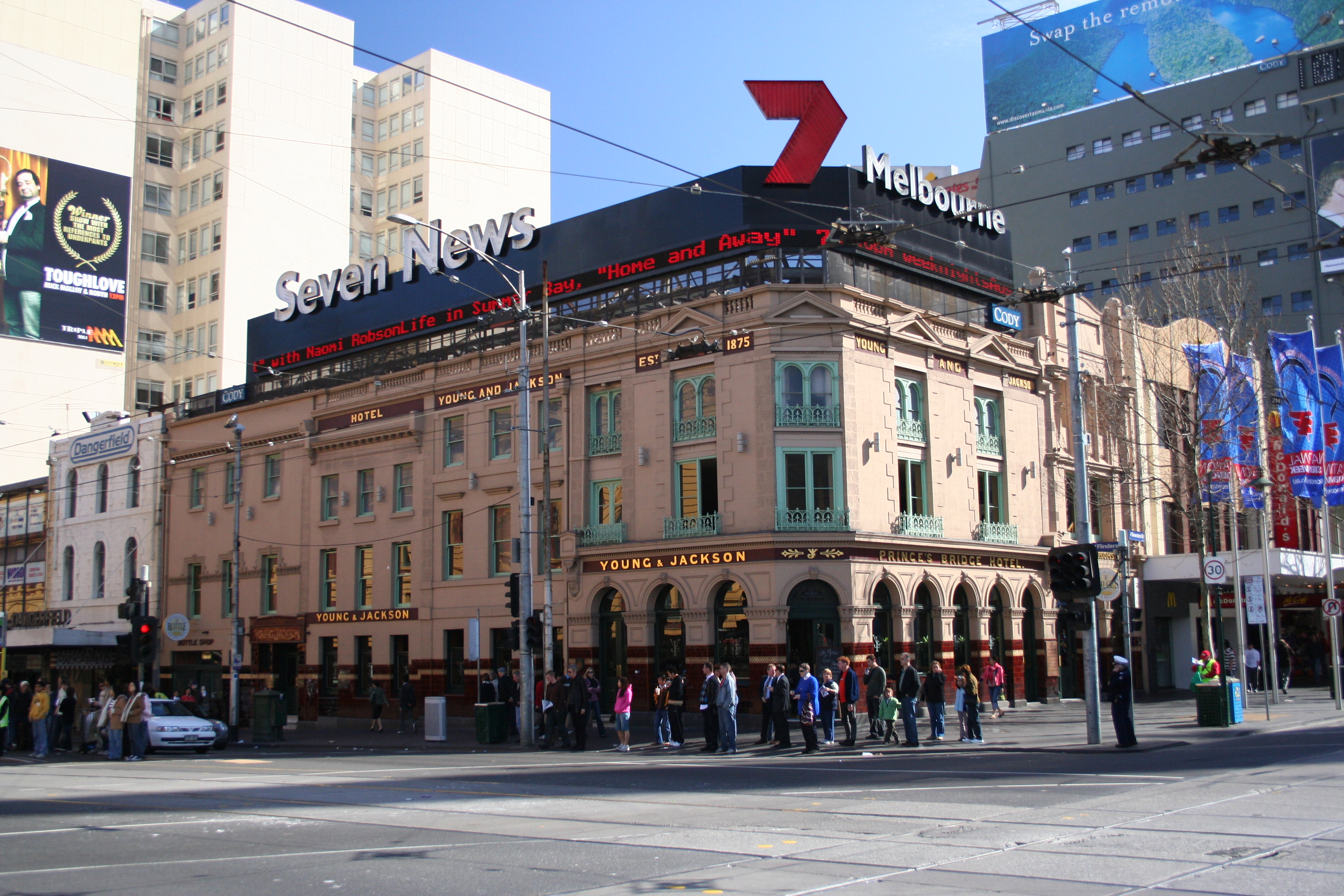
Young and Jacksons in Melbourne

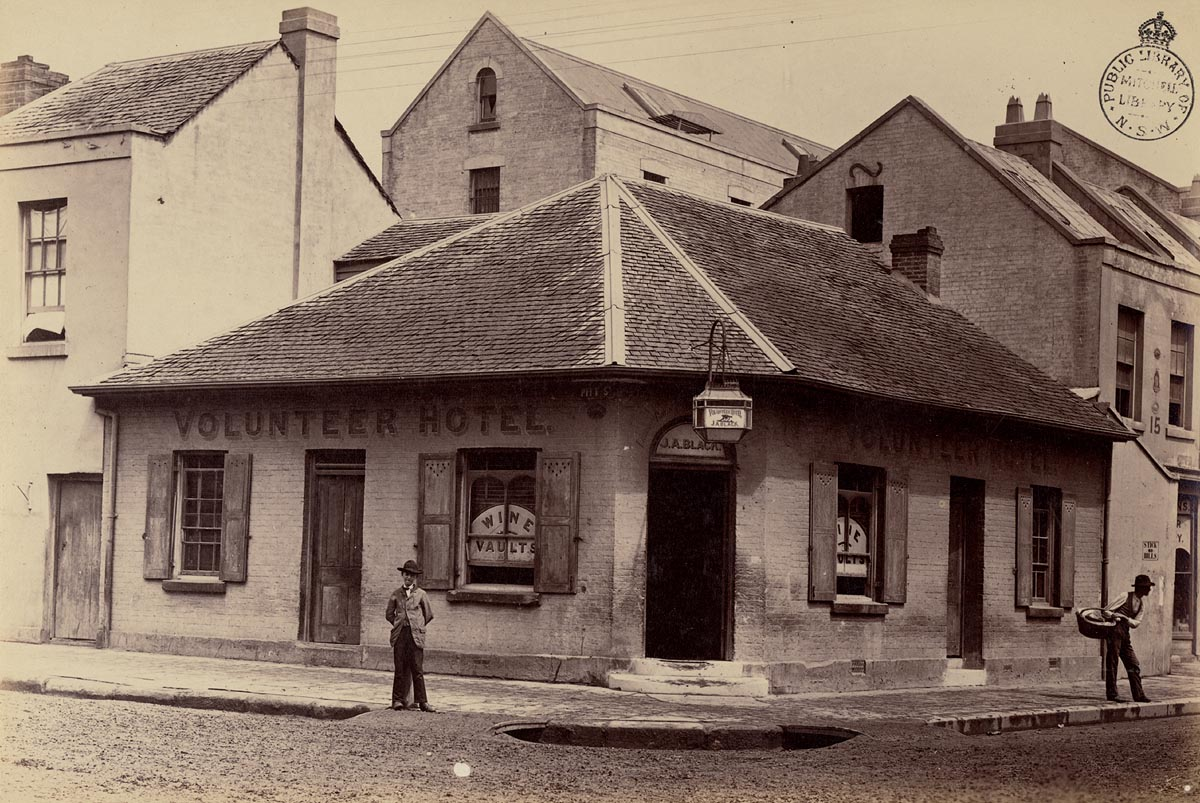
The Volunteer Hotel, Sydney, 1870

Australia is home to many pubs (public houses), also called hotels, which are establishments licensed to serve alcoholic drinks for consumption on the premises. They may also provide other services, such as entertainment, meals and basic accommodation.

== History ==
=== Origin ===
Pubs in Australia are descendants of the British and Irish pub. The production and consumption of alcoholic drinks has long played a key role in Western commerce and social activity. The importance of pubs is highlighted by the British colonisation of Australia after 1788. However, in the 19th century, the local version improved a number of distinctive features that set it apart from the classic British or urban Irish pub.

In many cases, pubs were the first structures built in newly colonised areas, especially on the goldfields, and new towns often grew up around them. Pubs typically served multiple functions, simultaneously serving as hostelry, post office, restaurant, meeting place and sometimes even general store.

=== 19th-century development ===
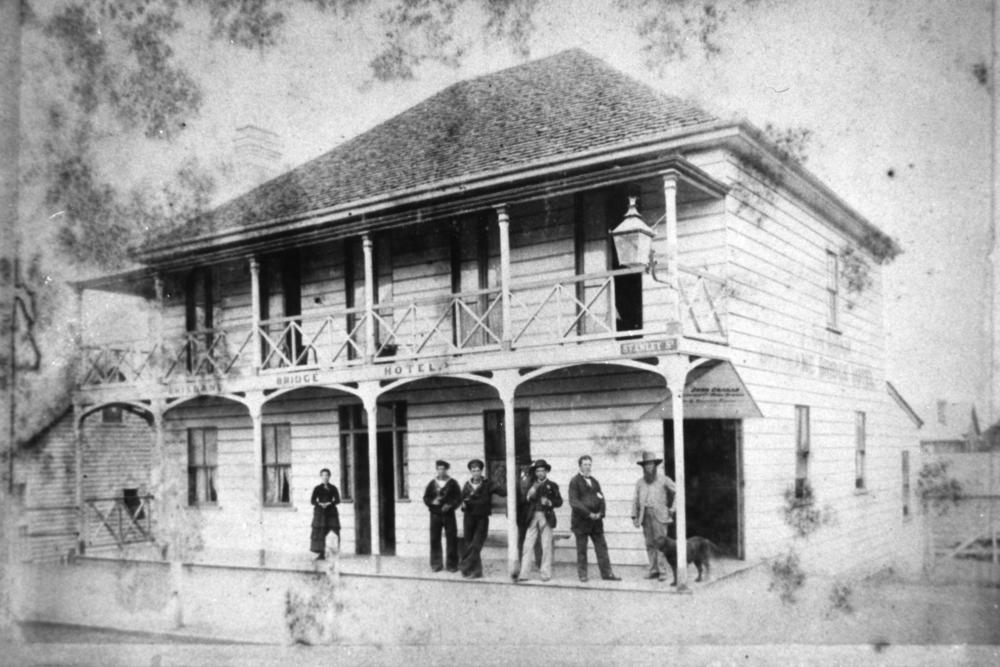
The Brisbane Bridge Hotel, Brisbane, c. 1878.

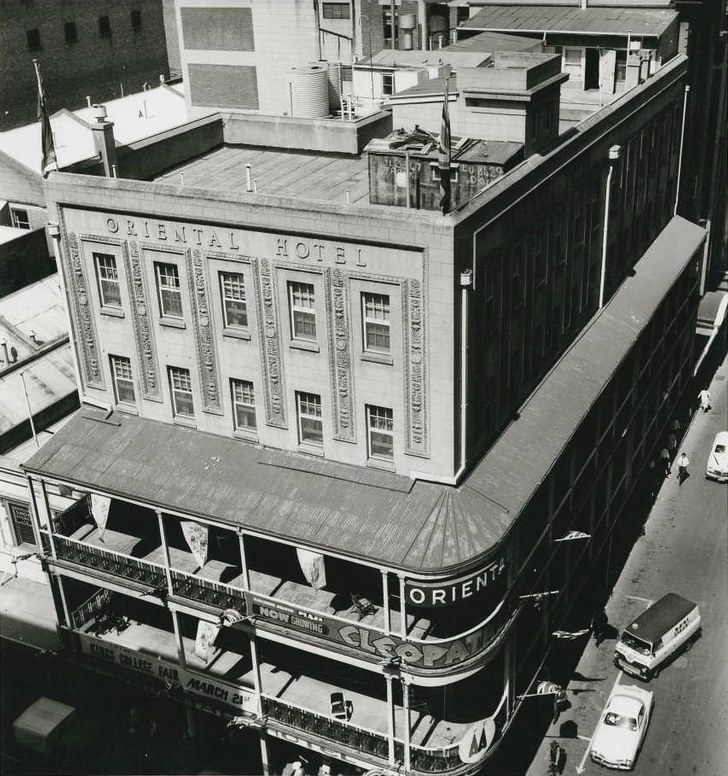
The Oriental Hotel, circa 1964, in Adelaide, South Australia.

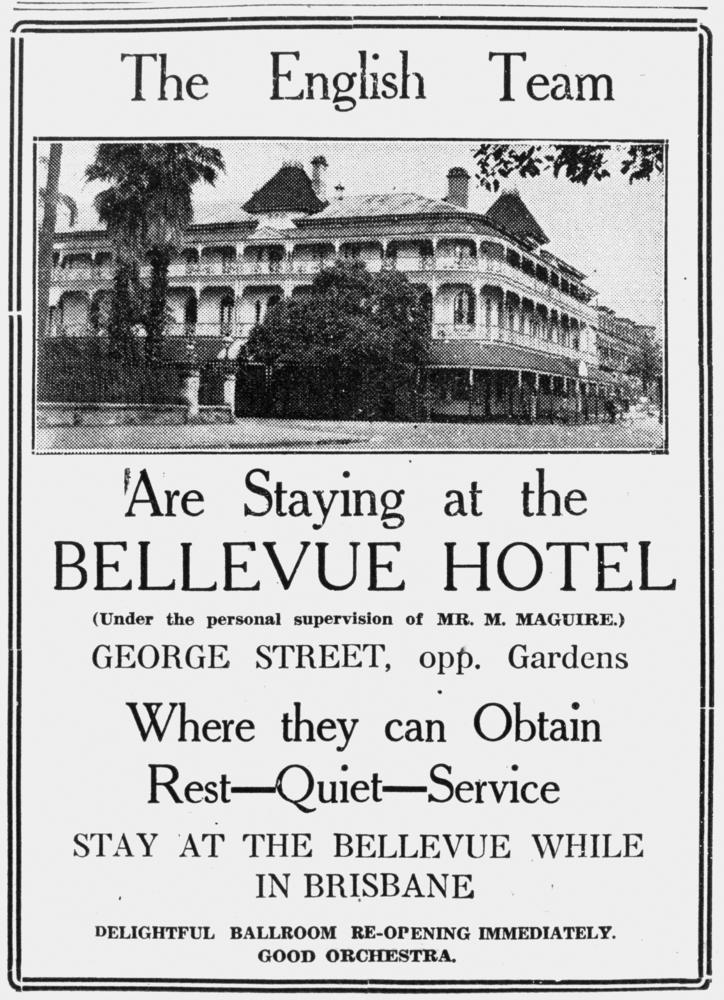
The Bellevue hotel in 1933

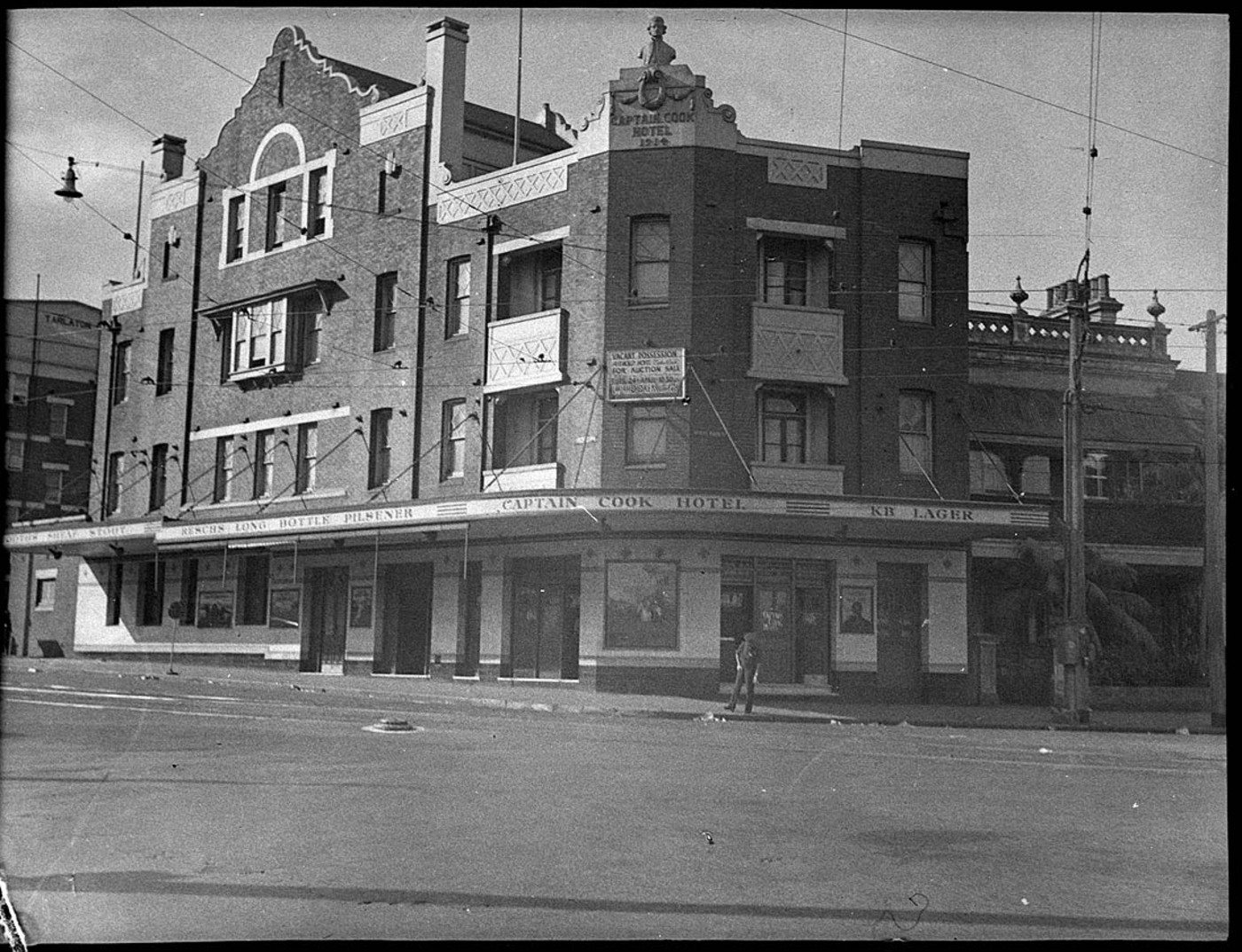
Captain Cook Hotel, Paddington in 1951. Photograph taken by Sam Hood for LJ Hooker, State Library of New South Wales, 31801

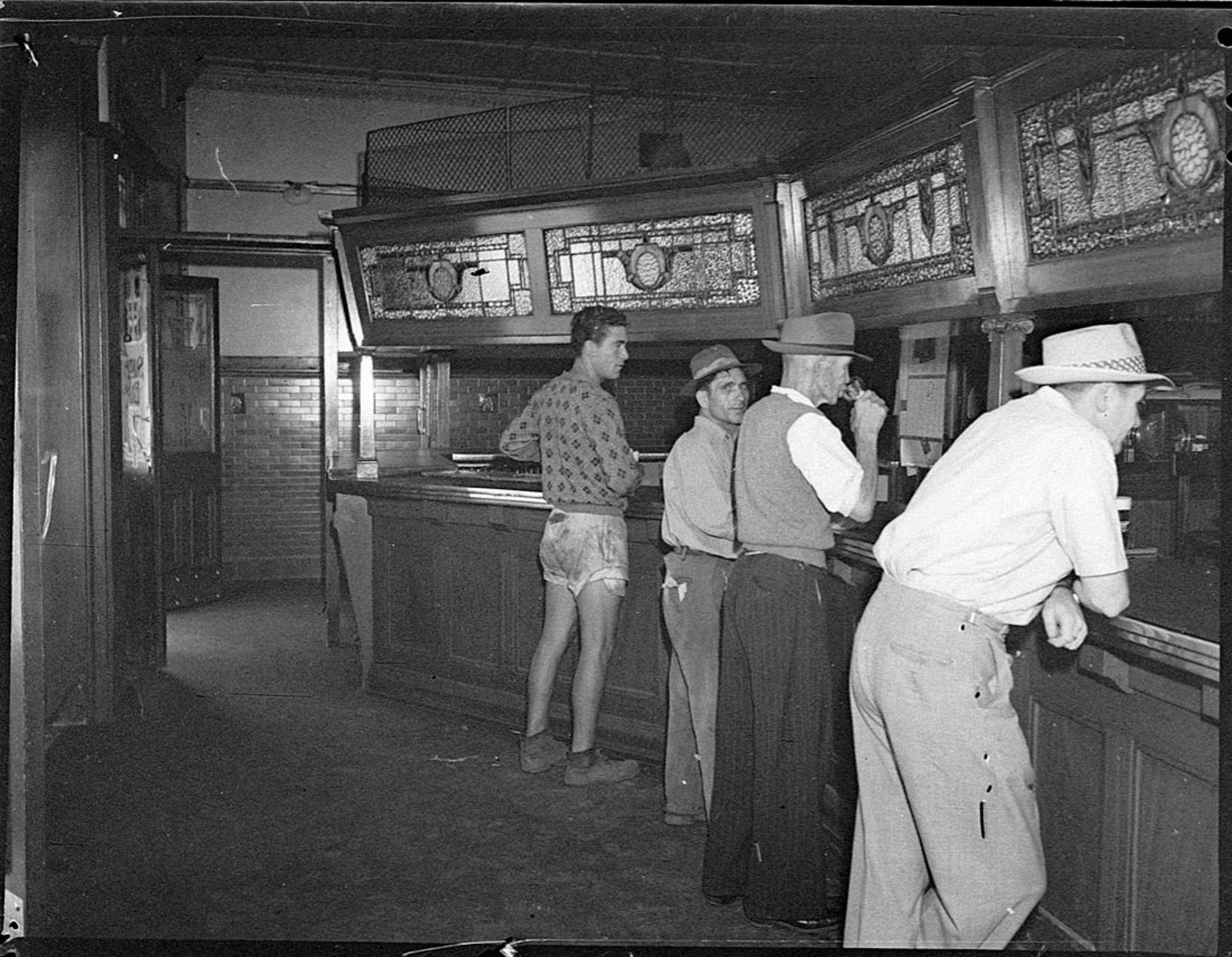
Patrons of Captain Cook Hotel, Paddington in 1951. Photograph taken by Sam Hood for LJ Hooker, State Library of New South Wales, 31796

Pubs proliferated during the 19th century, especially during the gold rush that began in the 1850s, and many fine examples were built in the state capitals and major regional cities and towns. Some of the best colonial-era pubs in Australia's major cities have fallen victim to urban re-development, which has destroyed a significant portion of Australia's 19th-century architectural heritage. State capitals like Melbourne and Adelaide, and large regional cities and towns such as Kalgoorlie in Western Australia still boast some examples, and many other 19th-century pubs survive in country towns.

Among the colonial-era hotels, now lost to development, were the Bellevue Hotel in Brisbane (demolished in 1979) and two of Sydney's pub-hotels – the Hotel Australia, which formerly stood on the corner of Castlereagh St and Martin Place (demolished c. 1970 to make way for the MLC Centre) and the Tattersall's Hotel in Pitt St. Its marble bar was dismantled and reinstalled in a basement under the Sydney Hilton Hotel, which was built on the site of the Tattersall's Hotel in the early 1970s.

The development that solidified the characteristic style of the modern Australian pub was the introduction of the American-style bar counter in the early nineteenth century. Customers began to sit apart from the publicans, the atmosphere became commercial rather than home-like and the pub became a distinctly public, Australian male-dominated establishment.

== Beer drinking culture in Australia ==
Australia's beer-drinking culture is descended from the northern European tradition, which favoured grain-derived beverages like beer and spirits, whereas in southern European countries like Italy and Greece wine was the drink of choice. Beer was for many years the largest-selling form of alcoholic drink in Australia, and Australia has long had one of the highest per capita rates of beer consumption in the world.

Australia did not develop a significant wine-making industry until the 20th century and while the wine industry grew steadily, wine did not become a major consumer drink until the late 20th century. Therefore, for the period between 1800 and 1950, alcohol production and consumption in Australia was dominated by beer and spirits, with Australian pubs becoming synonymous with ice-cold pilsener beer.

== Effect of licensing laws ==
Liquor licensing policies in early colonial Australia were relatively liberal, but in the late 19th century there was growing pressure from conservative Christian groups, known as the Temperance Leagues, to restrict the sale of alcohol. In 1916 after drunken soldiers rioted in Sydney new licensing laws restricted alcohol in all Australian states, in most cases banning sales after 6 pm. The new legislation also forced publicans seeking a spirits licence to also obtain a beer licence and to provide accommodation.

The licensing laws restricted the sale and service of alcohol almost exclusively to pubs for decades. Alcohol could usually be purchased only in pubs, and many states placed restrictions on the number of bottles per customer that could be sold over the counter. It was not until the late 20th century that "bottle-shops" and chain-store outlets (where liquor was sold but not served) became common and restaurants and cafes were more widely licensed to serve liquor or to allow customers to "bring their own".

Opening hours were generally heavily restricted, and pubs were usually open only from 10 am to 6 pm, Monday to Saturday. Some pubs were granted special licences to open and close earlier – e.g. opening at 6 am and closing at 3 pm – in areas where there were large numbers of people working night shifts. Pubs were invariably closed on Sundays, until the various state Sunday Observance Acts were repealed during the 1950s and early 1960s.

These restrictions created a small but lucrative black market in illegal alcohol, leading to the proliferation of illegal alcohol outlets in many urban areas; the so-called "sly grog shop". After the Federation of Australia in 1901, Australia's new constitution ruled that the Commonwealth of Australia had no power to legislate in this area, so each state enacted and enforced its own liquor licensing regulations. This meant the Prohibition lobby in Australia had to lobby each individual state government, and was unable to achieve any nationwide ban on the sale of alcohol. Although liquor sales remained heavily restricted for many years, Australia did not experience the many social ills, including the vast expansion of organised crime that resulted from Prohibition in the United States in the 1920s.

== Pubs and licensing laws ==
Each Australian state has its own set of liquor licensing laws which regulate the times that pubs could open and close. Until recently these laws were relatively strict.

=== The six o'clock swill ===
From the advent of the eight-hour day until the late 1970s, most Australian blue-collar workers were tied to a 9am-5pm, Monday-to-Friday work schedule. Because most pubs were only permitted to stay open until 6 pm, workers would commonly head for the nearest pub as soon as they finished work at 5 pm, where they would drink as much as possible, as quickly as possible, in the hour before the pub closed. This practice came to be known as the "six o'clock swill".

It fostered an endemic culture of daily binge drinking, which in turn created persistent problems of alcohol-related violence – drunken patrons regularly got into alcohol-fuelled fights in and around the pub, and many husbands arrived home in the early evening extremely drunk, with negative consequences. This destructive 'tradition' persisted through most of the 20th century but it quickly disappeared after the 1960s, when changes to the licensing laws in most states allowed pubs to stay open until 10 pm.

Another factor that reinforced the nexus between pubs and problem drinking was that, until the late 20th century in most parts of Australia, alcohol could usually only be purchased over the counter at the pub, and the types and amount of alcohol that could be sold was also restricted.

=== The bottle shop ===
The pub-based bottle shop "bottle-o", usually one of the smaller bars converted into a sales area for bottled and canned drinks, is now commonplace in Australian pubs, but these only began to appear in the 1960s. These were followed by specialist "sales-only" retail outlet chains where alcohol is not served on the premises.

Legal restrictions vary by state, but generally continue to mandate that alcohol be sold in a "separately defined area" (NSW), and while some smaller retailers like Aldi sell alcohol in the same store, Coles and Woolworths supermarkets do not. Specialist liquor stores account for most of the alcohol sold in Australia.

In most large cities and towns there were also a number of designated "early openers", pubs that were specially licensed to open in the early morning and close mid-afternoon. These early openers primarily catered for shift workers who had just finished a 9pm-6am night shift.

=== Violence and crime ===
These regulations and conventions created a climate in which many pubs – especially those located near dockyards and other industrial sites – gained a reputation for being violent, dangerous and generally unsavoury places. Australians were among the highest per capita alcohol consumers in the world, and the combination of large amounts of alcohol, an all-male clientele and aggravating factors like the "six o'clock swill" (see above) regularly led to violent clashes between inebriated patrons.

The relationship between pubs and crime in Australia was established early, and some inner-city and suburban pubs were frequented by criminals, who met there to recruit accomplices and plan "jobs". Criminals also regularly used particular pubs as "shop fronts" from which to sell the proceeds of their crimes on the black market. Late in the twentieth century, this tradition came to include drug dealing, and every major Australian city has pubs which became notorious from the 1970s as virtual "supermarkets" for many types of drug.

=== Gambling ===
Gaming and betting is another major part of Australian pub culture. Legal gambling is a relatively new phenomenon in Australia, but illegal gaming has always been part of pub culture. Because legal betting on horse and dog races was for many years restricted to racetracks, and no off-track betting was permitted, illegal betting (usually known as "starting price" or SP bookmaking) proliferated. Pubs became a major venue for the collection of bets and the distribution of winnings. One Australian author has noted that SP bookmaking had become so widespread by the early 20th century that constituted "a virtual national act of civil disobedience".

One of the betting games most closely associated with the Aussie pub was the coin game two-up, which was extremely popular during the 19th and earlier 20th century. It is most often associated with the celebration of Anzac Day on 25 April each year. In the years after World War I, it became traditional that, after the early morning commemorative service and march, ex-servicemen would gather at local pubs to drink, reminisce and play two-up. Although still technically illegal, Anzac Day two-up games are now openly played in streets and laneways outside pubs and it has become a national institution that is now generally ignored by police.

Slot machines, known locally as "pokies", remain an important source of custom and revenue, although restrictive state-level licensing means that only a minority of pubs can operate them. In 2002, over half of the $4 billion in gambling revenue collected by state governments came from pubs and clubs.

== Live music and the pub circuit ==
In the 1970s and 1980s, pubs played an important role as venues for live rock music in Australia.

Reflecting the age of its fans, in the preceding decades, pop and rock music performances were typically "all ages" events. Smaller concerts were often held in public venues like community, church, school or local council halls, and larger performances (like tours by visiting international acts) were staged in major concert halls or sports stadiums. Some concerts were staged in licensed premises, but the vast majority were in public venues open to all ages, and alcohol was unavailable.

By the late 1960s, Australia's "baby boomer" pop audience was ageing into its late teens and early twenties. This demographic trend coincided with the gradual relaxation of states' restrictive licensing laws – the legal drinking age was generally lowered to 18 (in line with changes to the voting age) and the opening hours of pubs were finally allowed to be extended to 10pm.

Rock concerts were attracting younger audiences in large numbers, and changes in the licensing laws enabled pubs to begin presenting regular concerts by rock groups in the early 1970s. Such "pub gigs" were often presented free-of-charge, with the cost recouped from alcohol sales, although it became more common for licensees and/or promoters to charge an entry fee, especially for the more popular groups whose fees were higher.

=== Low cost venues ===
The relatively low cost of staging pub gigs, the large numbers of patrons they attracted and the high volume of alcohol sales that resulted made them very attractive to pub licensees. State capitals like Melbourne and Sydney had dozens of pubs in inner-city and suburban areas, and many of these had large function rooms or large public bars; from the early 1970s pubs became one of the most important outlets for Australian rock music. Many significant Australian groups of the 1970s and 1980s – including AC/DC, Cold Chisel, Midnight Oil, The Choirboys and INXS – spent their formative years playing on the pub circuit.

Another significant feature of the pub gig was that it gave rock groups in the so-called "Second Wave" of Australian rock the chance to develop their performance and repertoire. Pubs like the renowned Station Hotel in Prahran, Melbourne, offered extended residencies to popular or up-and-coming rock bands, enabling them to hone their playing 'chops' and refine their material in front of a varied audience, and many groups generated fiercely loyal local followings thanks to pub residencies.

The live proficiency of Australian 'pub-rock' bands of this period is widely attributed to their experiences playing in the rough-and-ready atmosphere of the pub circuit. Unlike the frenzied but generally upbeat atmosphere typical of Sixties pop shows, pub gigs could be a testing experience for even the most accomplished band. Often as not, a significant proportion of the audience were in varying states of intoxication, and groups who did not provide the kind of performance that was required by the audience would be mercilessly heckled by dissatisfied crowds.

=== Regular venues ===
By the late 1970s a significant number of capital-city and regional pubs were presenting rock music on a regular basis, forming a loose but lucrative circuit of venues for bands all over Australia, and the most popular venues offered music every night of the week.

Certain groups became closely associated with formative residencies at particular pubs – a prime example was the long-running residency by Midnight Oil at the Royal Antler Hotel in Narrabeen, on Sydney's northern beaches in the late 1970s.

Some pubs became associated with particular styles – in the early 1980s, the Civic Hotel in Sydney's CBD provided important support for many emerging local "new wave" acts including Mental As Anything, The Choirboys, The Numbers, Sunnyboys, INXS and Matt Finish. Other pub-rock venues became renowned for offering a wide variety of music by the best established and emerging acts; venues of this period include the General Bourke Hotel in Adelaide, the Railway Hotel in Richmond, Victoria, and in Sydney, the Annandale Hotel, the Family Inn in Rydalmere, the Hopetoun Hotel in Surry Hills and the Sandringham Hotel in Newtown.

By the end of the 1970s the pub circuit was a major provider of rock music entertainment in Australia and as a result, early tours by many visiting overseas acts from overseas who were becoming popular in Australia included many performances at major city and regional pubs; this included the first Australian tours by bands like XTC, The Cure and Simple Minds; such bands were often "broken" locally thanks to airplay on the ABC's new non-commercial 24-hour rock radio station Triple J, which played a wide variety of new music not heard on commercial pop-rock stations, and many international rock acts of the 1980s gained live exposure on the Australian pub circuit before gaining wider acceptance.

Pub rock flourished in the 1980s, and this period is now regarded with a degree of nostalgia, and it has come to be considered something of a "golden age" for Australian post-punk rock music. A number of social and economic trends combined to reduce the flourishing pub-rock circuit to a shadow of its former self.

In the late 1980s Australian state governments began relaxing the laws governing legalised gambling. One of the most significant changes was the controversial decision to allow the placement of poker machines in pubs. Poker machines quickly delivered huge financial returns to pub licensees and it soon became much easier and more profitable for licensees to close the rooms formerly used for music shows and refurbish them as poker machine parlours.

=== The effects of real estate development ===
Another related trend that severely affected the pub circuit was the property boom in Australian capital cities in the 1980s. In cities like Sydney, which once boasted dozens of pubs in the central business district alone, rising prices and increased demand for CBD and inner-city properties saw many pubs closed and demolished. Their strategic location made them prime targets for redevelopment, as did the fact that these buildings – which were often only two or three stories high – were relatively easy and cheap to buy up and redevelop.

The interlinked process of urban redevelopment and gentrification also had a major effect on pubs that acted as rock music venues. From the 1970s on, Australian capital-city CBDs began to be redeveloped; many buildings that were once occupied by businesses or offices that operated on a 9-to-5 basis moved to cheaper locations and in the 1990s a significant number of formerly commercial buildings were either demolished to make way for apartment complexes, or were redeveloped for housing.

=== Gentrification ===
Another trend that had a significant impact on the pub circuit was the process of gentrification in inner-city suburbs in Australian cities. For much of the 20th century, suburbs like Port Melbourne and Newtown (Sydney) were working class, low-income areas with a high proportion of migrants, sometimes regarded as slums.

However, in the last quarter of the 20th century, suburbs like Paddington, Glebe and Newtown attracted many younger people because of their colourful character, the availability of cheap rental housing and their proximity to the city and major tertiary institutions like The University of Sydney. Many former students eventually settled in the area and bought property there, and these former "slums" soon became some sought-after locales, beginning a process of gentrification that saw many pub venues put under increasing pressure to modify their trading hours and limit the amount of noise that emanated from pub gigs, which was often considerable. These significant changes to social demographies led to many renowned pub venues such as the Hopetoun Hotel in Surry Hills ceasing their presentation of music and other events. The inherent value of the property occupied by pubs also led to many more being demolished or developed. One notable casualty of this trend in Sydney was the former Harold Park Hotel in Glebe. This once thriving pub venue was a popular music venue from the late 1970s to the mid-1990s, and during its heyday in the 1980s, as well as regular rock gigs, it presented a variety of other events including:

- "Writers in the Park", a weekly performance forum for authors, which featured an appearance by renowned author Tom Wolfe
- "Comics in the Park", which presented some of the best Australian and overseas comedians, including a legendary impromptu stand-up performance by American comedian Robin Williams
- the weekly political discussion forum "Politics in the Park"

== Australian pub design ==
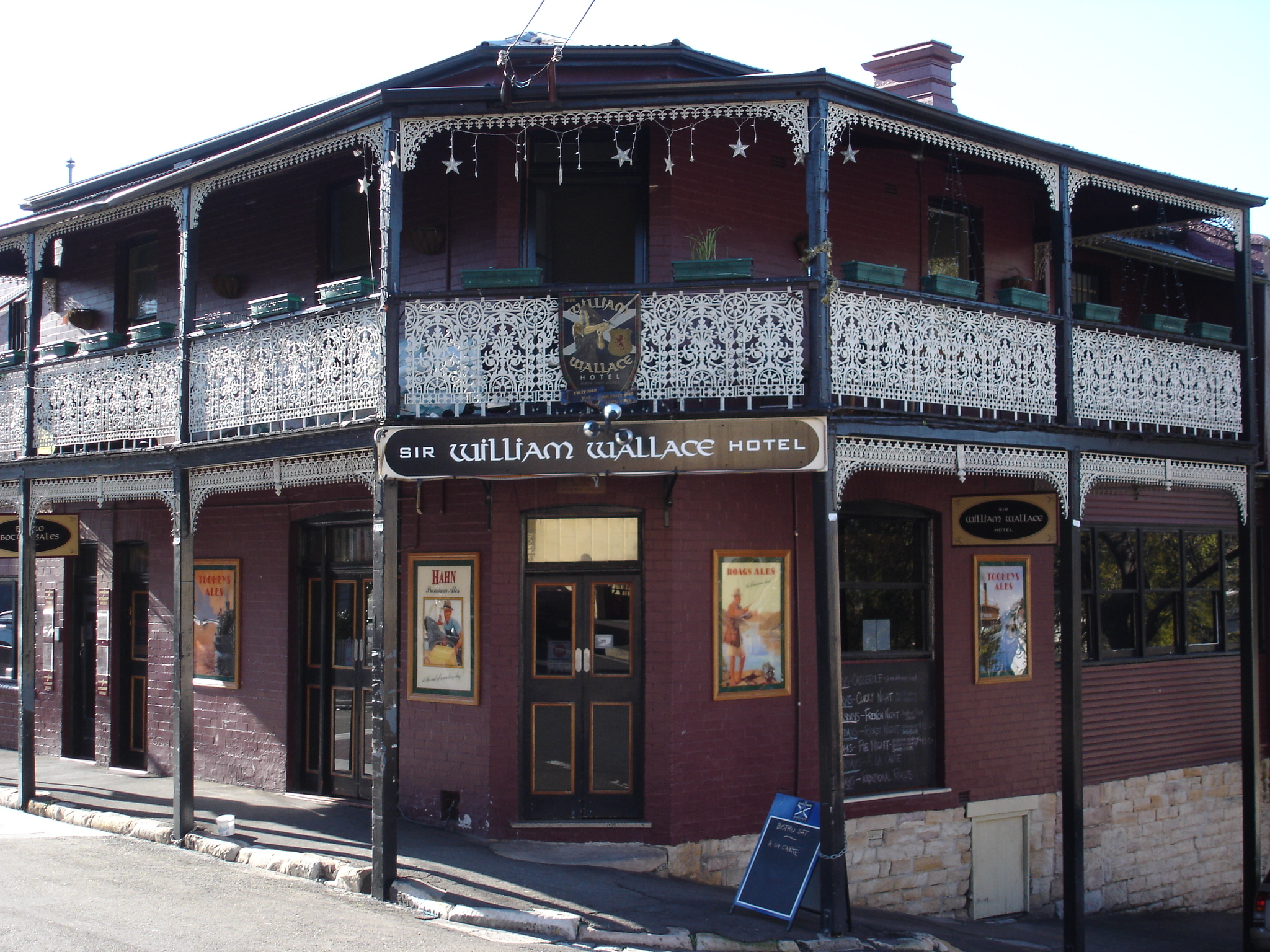
Sir William Wallace Hotel, Balmain

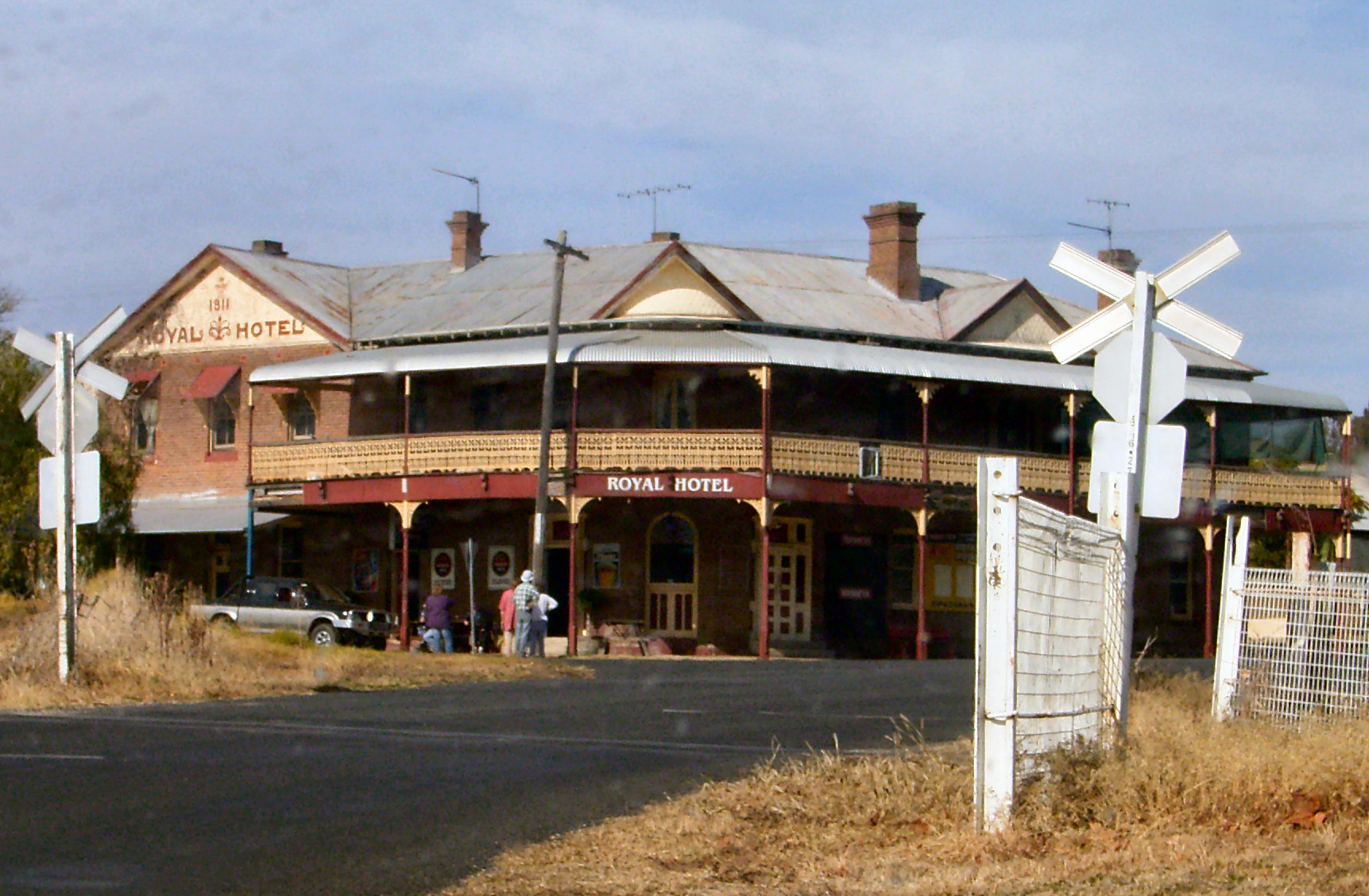
Royal Hotel, Woodstock.

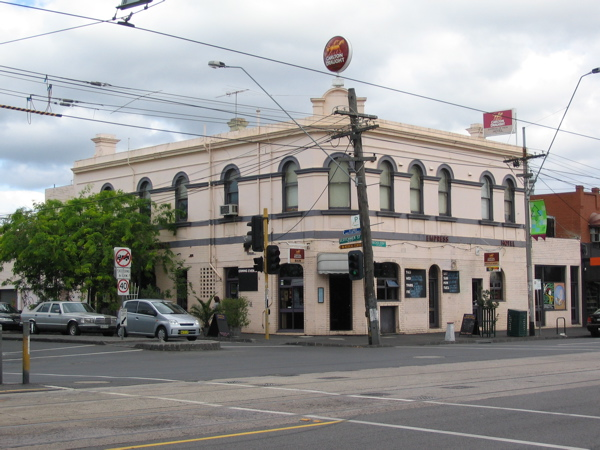
Empress Hotel, Fitzroy North

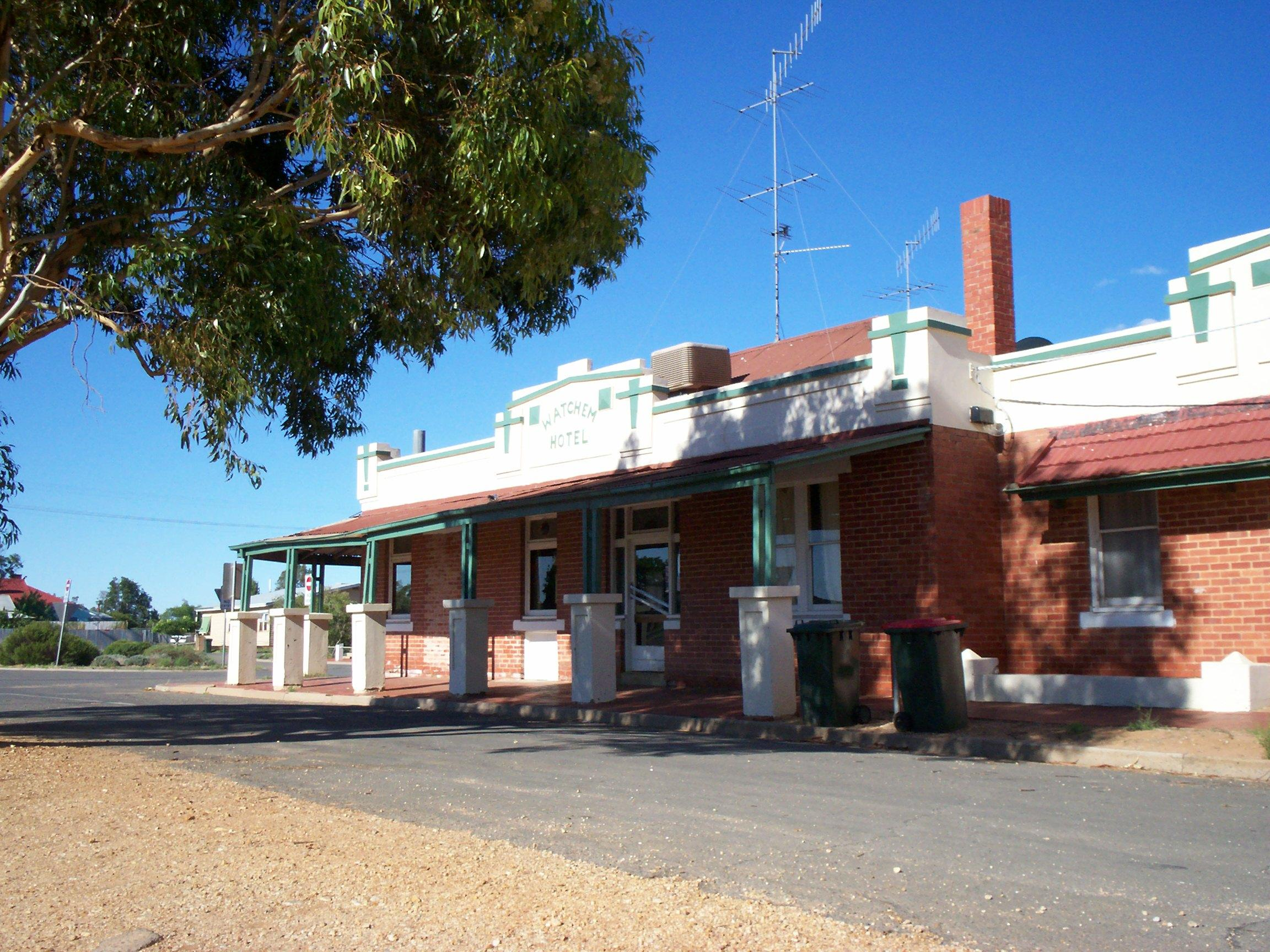
Watchem Hotel, Watchem, Victoria

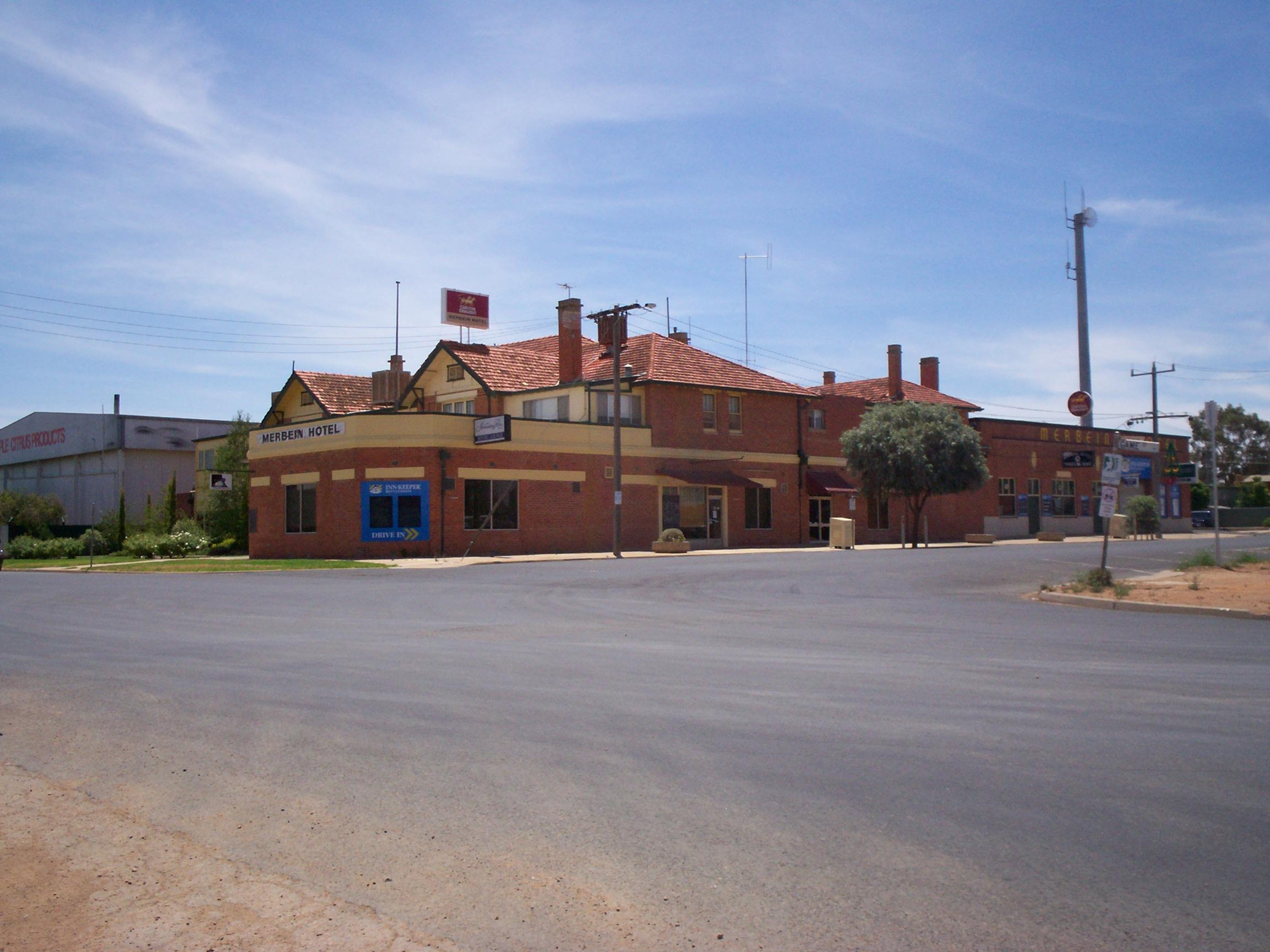
Merbein Hotel, Merbein, Victoria

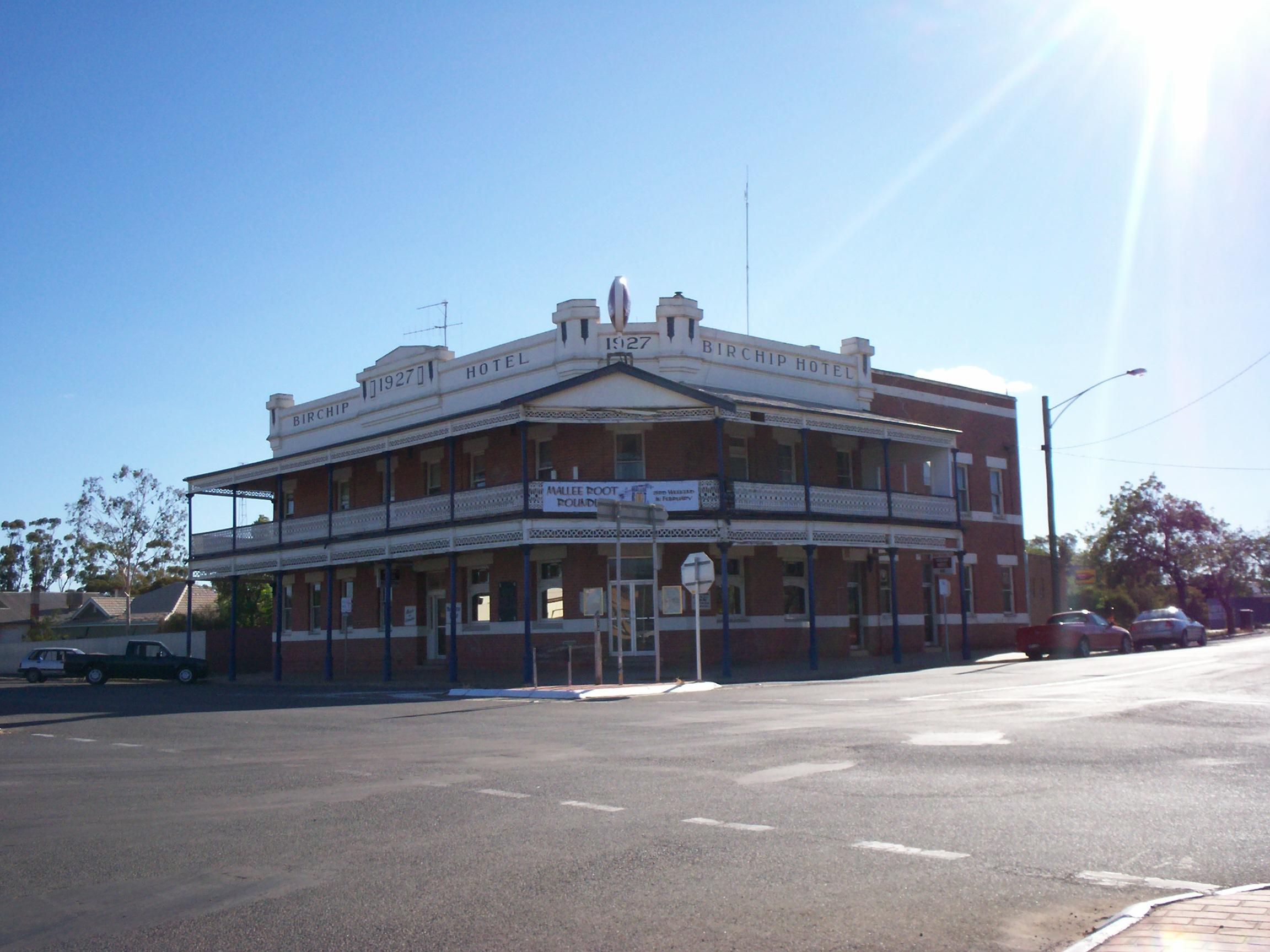
Birchip Hotel, Birchip, Victoria

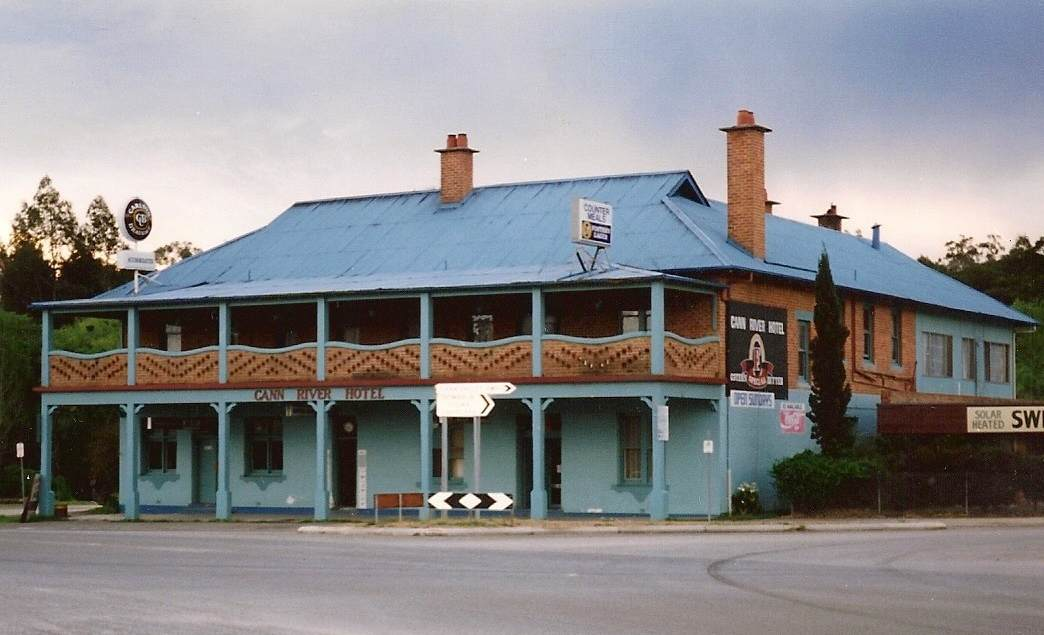
Cann River Hotel, Cann River, Victoria

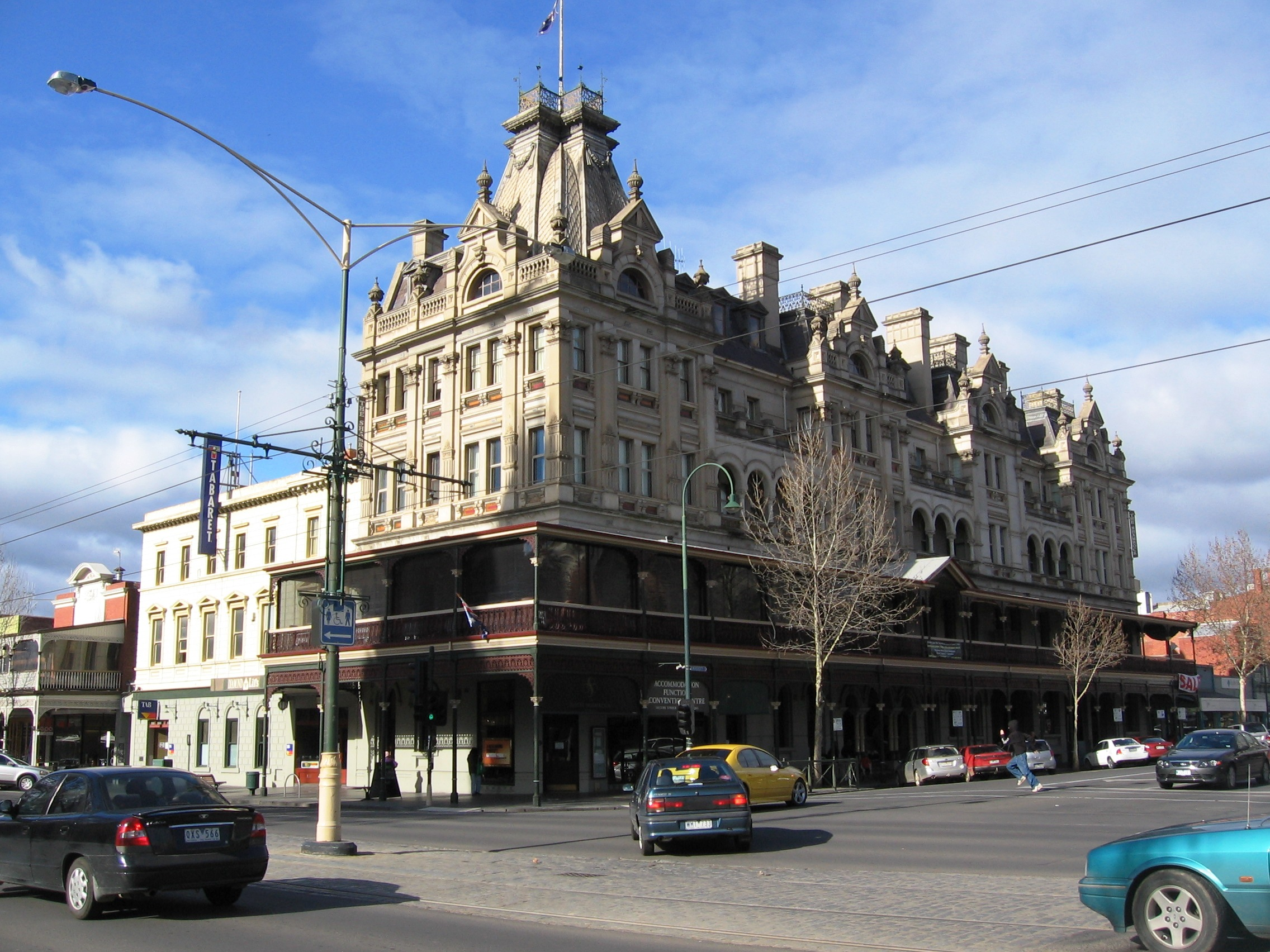
Shamrock Hotel, Bendigo, Victoria

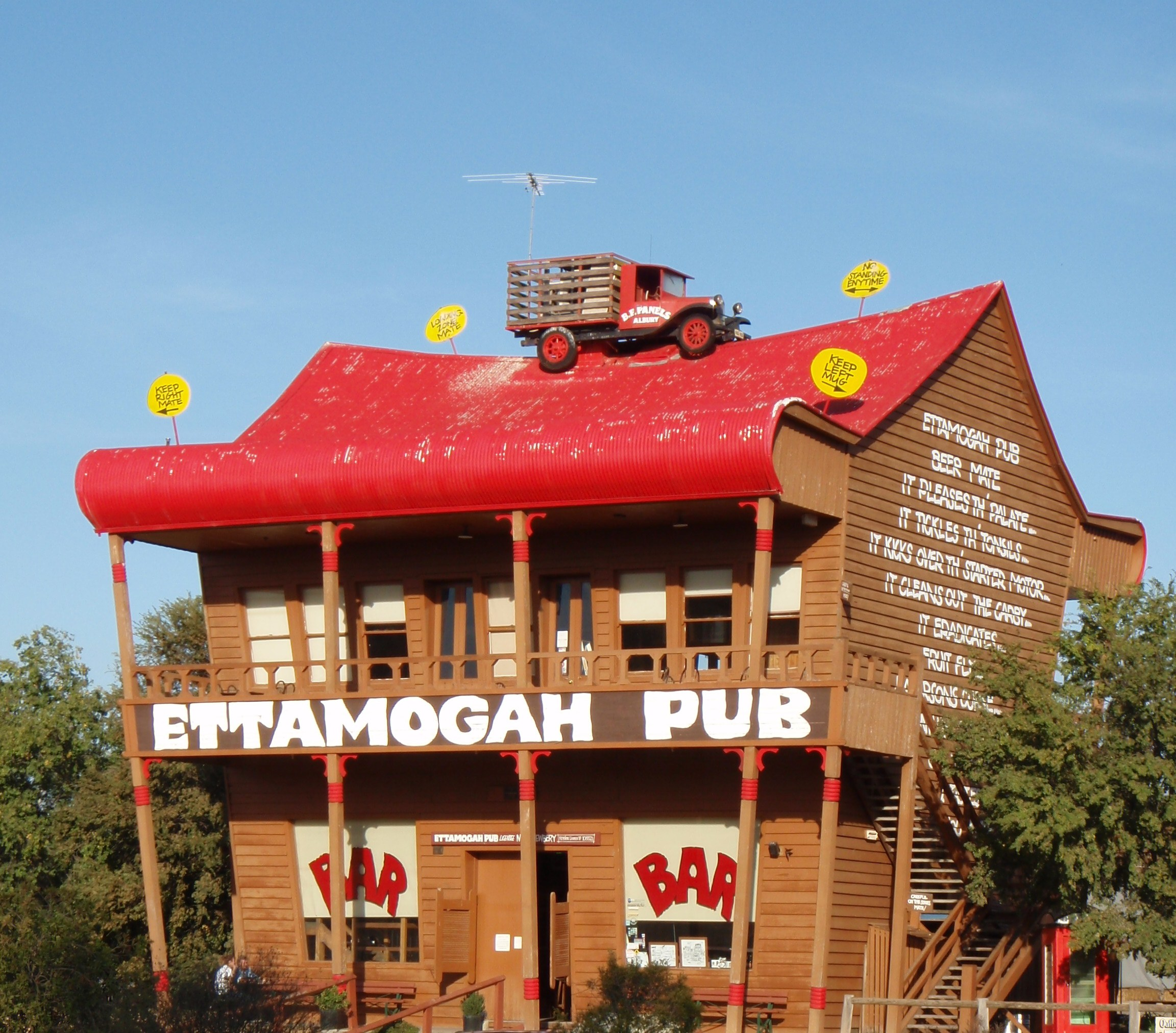
The Ettamogah Pub, near Albury, NSW.

The typical Aussie pub differs markedly from the cosy, welcoming, family-friendly "cottage" atmosphere of British pubs, albeit with some exceptions. Rapid urban development, coupled with a widespread disregard for Australia's colonial architectural history, has played a large part in this. Most older English pubs have been declared protected heritage sites, since many are now centuries old, but this curatorial attitude is yet to achieve widespread acceptance in Australia, and few pubs in Australia date back further than the second half of the 19th century and some of the grandest Victorian-era pubs have also been destroyed.

Surviving late 19th-century pubs such as the Old Canberra Inn in Lyneham, Australian Capital Territory are similar to their British antecedents in layout and atmosphere, although many Australian pubs of this era are typically a good deal larger than the average British pub; many are three stories high or more, and they usually include several very spacious bar areas, as well as large accommodation spaces on the upper floors.

Major regional and country pubs dating from the 19th century and early 20th century are often large and imposing structures, and many were lavishly decorated, both inside and out. Because of Australia's high summer temperatures, wide awnings and verandahs were common around pub exteriors, as they were for most colonial-era commercial buildings. Pub verandahs and balconies were often fitted with elaborate iron lace facings and cast-iron columns, because these new mass-produced components were highly fashionable, relatively cheap, and easily transportable. Sometimes, in areas where wood was plentiful, internal decoration included elaborately carved wooden fretwork panels.

=== In the nineteenth century ===
19th century pub interiors often featured very high ceilings – typically four metres (12 feet) or more. Ceilings and upper walls were often embellished with elaborate plaster panels and cornices. Mass-produced embossed tin panelling was widely used when it became available in the late 19th century. Windows were often glazed with decorative leadlight or etched/sandblasted glass panes.

The main bars in the biggest pubs typically featured large serving bars, featuring intricately carved and finished wood and/or stone features, with brass rails, ceramic or brass pump handles, tiles, mirrors, etched glass panels and many other types of decoration.

By far the most opulent extant example of the 19th-century Australian pub bar is the famed Marble Bar, originally built in the former Tattersall's Hotel in Sydney. Even relatively modest pubs often featured impressive bars carved from native Australian red cedar (which was then in plentiful supply) and other native woods, and often embellished with decorative ceramic tiles and marble and/or brass fittings.

=== In the twentieth century ===
Following the consolidation of the brewery industry in the 20th century, many new pubs were built and in large cities many older pubs were either extensively renovated or demolished and replaced with new structures.

Although Australian pubs vary considerably in size and design, it is possible to define a number of distinctive features that describe the 'classic' Australian urban pub of the mid-20th century. The typical Aussie pub was functionally designed, often in a stripped-back Art Deco or International Style. Usually two or three-storey structures, they are typically built of brick and/or concrete, making extensive use of prefabricated plaster sheeting and cornices, ceramic tiles and terrazzo in their internal linings.

In layout, urban pubs typically feature several inter-connected bar-rooms of different sizes and designations, usually clustered around a large central bar area with several serving outlets. Many suburban pubs also often include an outdoor or semi-enclosed area known as a "beer garden", where food and drink was served and where (especially in recent years) families with children are able to eat (although children of course cannot be served alcohol and they are not permitted in any other area of the pub).

Larger pubs – especially regional cities and large towns – often included a substantial kitchen and dining room and/or a function room of some kind, such as a ballroom, although this was not common in later urban pubs. A feature common to almost all Australian pubs, whether in the city, the suburbs or in rural and regional areas, was the provision of rooms that could be rented out as accommodation, usually located on the floors above the bars.

In an article on Aboriginal drinking in The Townsville Daily Bulletin dated 8 September 1973, J. V. Dillon, district officer with the Department of Aboriginal and Islander affairs criticised the design of many Queensland hotels, which he noted were "geared for straight swill sessions and not conducive to social drinking". He noted "There should be more beer gardens in tropical settings to create a relaxed drinking atmosphere. Licensing Courts should make some provision for this when granting hotel licenses".

Unlike their ornate 19th-century predecessors, 20th century pub bars are relatively spartan in design and decoration. In most pubs the ceilings and upper walls were fairly plain, although some featured moulded Art Deco cornice and ceiling designs. The lower walls were typically tiled for ease of cleaning, and floors were usually paved with terrazzo and/or tiles.

=== Decorative art ===
Compared to America and Europe, relatively few large Art Deco and International Style buildings were constructed in Australia in the 1930s and 1940s. Few of these have survived the recent waves of urban redevelopment and most of Australia's fine Art Deco cinemas, shops, restaurants and office buildings were torn down in the late 20th century. Therefore, Australian pubs of the mid-20th century are among the best surviving examples of Art Deco and International Style urban architecture in Australia.

Although these newer pubs were generally far more utilitarian in design than their predecessors, one especially notable decorative feature of Australian pubs developed in the 1920s and 1930s – the iconic paint-on-glass beer advertisement.

This distinctive Australian graphic genre probably evolved from the elaborate back-painted bar mirrors of the 19th century. Often mounted on the outer walls of pubs, these eye-catching pieces were not printed posters or standard paintings. They were elaborate craft products created by teams of skilled commercial artists, many of whom were employed by the breweries for their entire working lives.

The creation of these beer ads was a specialised craft – they were entirely hand-painted in reverse on thick glass, and then wall-mounted in heavy brass frames, which were kept highly polished. Some exterior displays were made with translucent paint, so that they could be illuminated from behind. They featured striking and often highly stylised designs and compositions, painted in vibrant colours, and in many cases the text and some parts of the graphic were accentuated with real gold leaf.

They varied in size, but the larger examples were as much as a square metre in size or more. Like the example below, they typically depicted archetypal 'Aussie' sporting scenes – swimming, surfing, sailing, horse-racing, cricket or football – or social events such as picnics, dances and parties.

Many Deco-style pubs had sections of curved façade, because a large proportion of Australian pubs are built on street corners, and these spaces were often highlighted by the large curved frames of these colourfully painted beer ads.

Because of their inherent fragility and location, many of these marvellous works either deteriorated beyond repair or were destroyed by accident or vandalism. Over the years, as advertising materials (and the pubs themselves) were progressively modernised during the late 20th century, almost all the hand-painted beer ads were removed, but their distinctive style has become well-recognised and much-loved, and they are still a reference point in modern Australian commercial art. The best surviving examples are now museum pieces and expensive collector's items.

== Pubs and social segregation ==
Perhaps the most striking functional difference between Australian pubs and drinking establishments in other countries is that, for most of their history, Australian pubs were strictly segregated along gender and racial lines.

As author Diane Kirkby has observed: "Masculinity and national identity were ... interwoven with pub culture and the ethnic and sexual exclusivity of that culture was celebrated."

In a controversial move in 2007, the Victorian Civil and Administrative Tribunal granted a gay bar in Collingwood, Victoria the right to refuse entry to heterosexuals and lesbians in order to preserve the bar's gay character.

=== Sex segregation ===
The main bar of the typical Australian pub, usually the largest, was the so-called "Public Bar". However, this title was an ironic misnomer, as until the early to mid-1970s (1969 in Queensland), only men were permitted to drink in Public Bars: most pubs included a "Ladies' Lounge" furnished with chairs and tables where women and men could drink together, but women were usually not admitted to the Lounge Bar unless accompanied by a man, and were usually not permitted to buy their own drinks.

This sexual segregation in pubs began to break down after women's rights activists began to publicly challenge the convention. One of the most famous incidents in this informal campaign took place in January 1973, when a group of feminist activists staged a protest against the rules in the Public Bar of the Hotel Manly in Sydney.

When they entered and ordered drinks, they were refused service by the publican, who typically claimed that the hotel had insufficient toilet facilities to cater for women. The women's response deliberately echoed the tactics of the early Suffragettes: they chained themselves to a railing that ran around the bar. The event gained wide media attention, and caused the hotel industry considerable embarrassment.

Within a few years, this long-standing convention had virtually disappeared in urban areas, and it was eventually enforced by state and federal anti-discrimination legislation in succeeding years.

=== Women in pubs ===
It has been found that, despite their long history of gender segregation, pubs provided an important source of income for many women.

Widowhood and wife desertion were much more common in 19th-century Australia than today, and in the absence of any social safety net for single mothers, women had to explore options to provide for their families, especially in remote areas. Pub-keeping provided jobs not only for widows and deserted wives, but also for many female ex-convicts. It was comparatively lucrative work, so pub-keeping became a welcome and preferred option for many women. The evolution of the 'classic' pub and the women's roles in the pub developed concurrently in the mid-19th century, when the term 'barmaid' first came into common usage.

Barmaids, like many other working women, had to fight against the 'traditional' gender challenges of lower pay rates and social stigmatisation. Unlike other classes of working women, such as domestic servants and shop staff, barmaids were often stigmatised and shunned. This discrimination was exacerbated by the 'morals' campaigns that were waged around Australia from the 1880s to the 1920s, and religiously motivated temperance activists deliberately fostered a negative image of the barmaid as a 'loose woman' who lured men into pubs to drink and squander their money. The reality was often the exact opposite. Barmaids typically prided themselves on their ability to pour, chat, and keep a clean bar simultaneously – not to mention their ability to support themselves and their family – and they deeply resented this characterisation by prohibitionists, but the stereotype stuck. Even though many barmaids loved the job because it offered better pay and greater freedom than typical female occupations like household servants, barmaids remained the object of scorn by 'proper' society.

== Pubs as accommodation ==
Accommodation was another vital facet of Australian pub operation, and indeed it is the origin of the pub's "proper" business title, often required by licensing requirements – Australian pubs are usually registered for business under the formal name "hotel", and the more upmarket pubs often reversed this, placing the word "Hotel" before the name (e.g. the Hotel Australia).

Many city, suburban and country pubs offered reasonably priced accommodation, as well as dining facilities for visitors and business people, and this tradition continues, with pubs joining in an accommodation cooperative that operates under the name "PubStay".

Country-town and rural hotels were of crucial importance in the years before the advent of the motel and modern budget hotel chains. Moreover, licensing laws often required the provision of a minimum level of accommodation, differentiating hotels from bars which themselves came under pressure from de-licensing legislation from the late 1890s onwards. Until the later 20th century, a significant proportion of tourists, commercial travellers, business people and touring performers in Australia regularly relied on pub accommodation. As one former commercial traveller lamented in a recent ABC Radio social history feature, the end of the era of pub accommodation also led to the disintegration of the social networks that centred on rural and regional pubs.

City and suburban pubs were an important accommodation source for country people visiting the cities for major events, such the annual Sydney Royal Easter Show. For single people, pubs also offered an alternative to boarding houses or rental housing, with many pubs renting rooms to long-term tenants who lived and ate at the pub, sometimes over periods of several decades.

== Australian pubs worldwide ==
There are an estimated 3,000 Australian themed pubs worldwide. They have been criticised for a lack of authenticity. They are particularly prevalent wherever expatriate communities are found, arguably due to a sense of connection to the Australian diaspora.

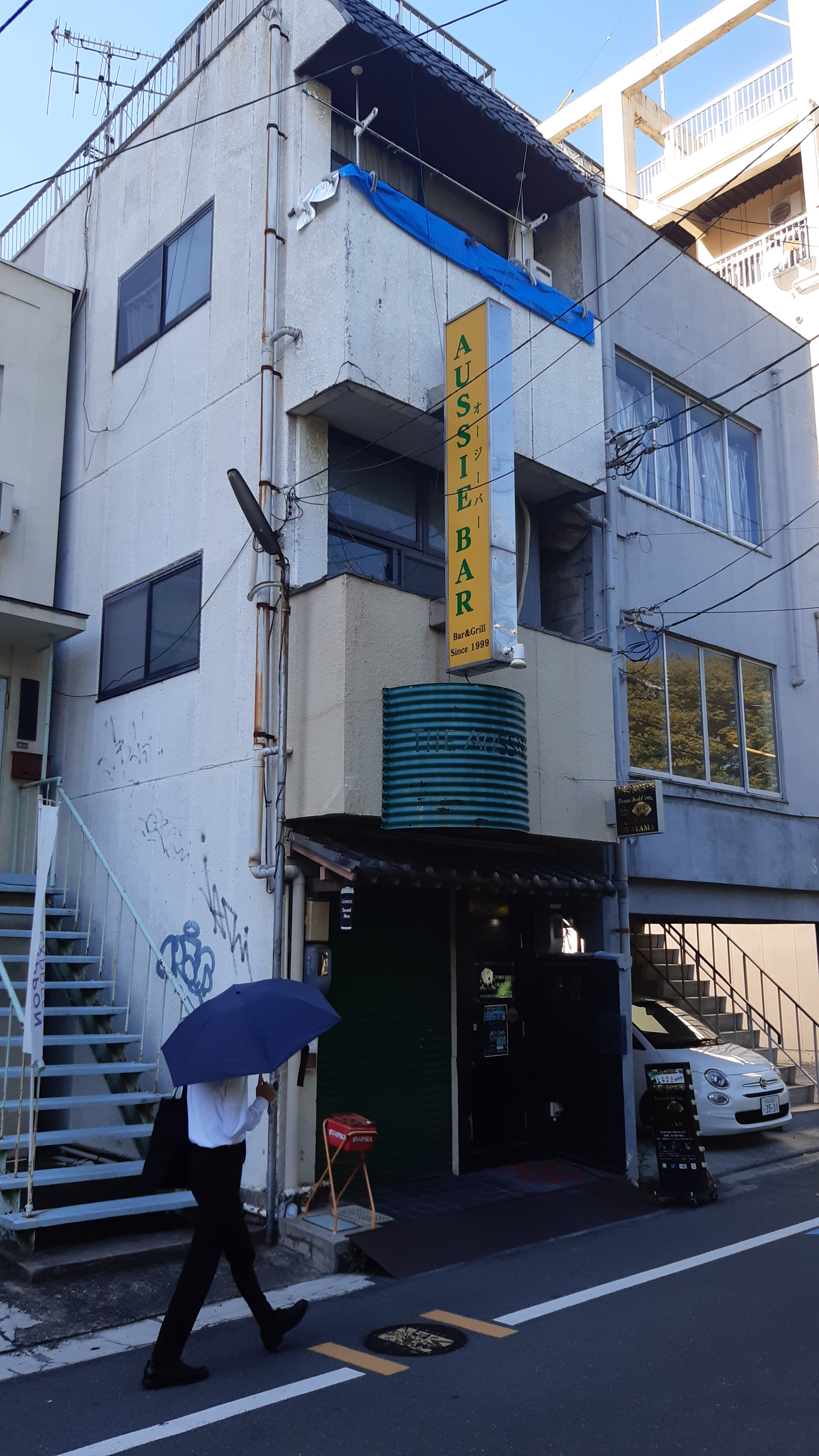
An Australian themed bar in Okayama, Japan

== See also ==
- List of public houses in Australia

== Further information ==
Dunstan, Keith
Wowsers
(Cassell, Melbourne, 1968)

Kirkby, Diane
Barmaids: A History of Women's Work in Pubs 1790-1990s
(Cambridge University Press, 1997)

McGuire, Paul
Inns of Australia
(William Heinemann, Melbourne, 1952)

Sumerling, Patricia
Down at the Local: A social history of the hotels of Kensington and Norwood
(Wakefield Press, Kent Town, SA)

Wright, Clare
Beyond The Ladies' Lounge: Australia's Female Publicans
(Melbourne University Press, Carlton, 2003)
ISBN 0-522-85071-5

http://www.indiana.edu/~engs/articles/ar1096.htm

- Abernethy & Dittmar, "Every Pub Volume 2" – 611 Hotels in South Australia
