= 1976 New South Wales daylight saving referendum =

- 1 May 1976
- At present there is a period commonly called "daylight saving" by which time is advanced by one hour for the period commencing on the last Sunday in October in each year and ending on the first Sunday in March in the following year. Are you in favour of daylight saving?

Results
Choice	Votes	%
Yes	1,879,967	68.41%
No	867,983	31.59%
Valid votes	2,747,950	98.75%
Invalid or blank votes	34,696	1.25%
Total votes	2,782,646	100.00%
Registered voters/turnout	2,989,786	93.07%

A referendum concerning whether daylight saving should be continued in New South Wales was put to voters in conjunction with the state election on 1 May 1976 and was carried with a comfortable majority.

== Background ==
Daylight saving had been introduced in Australia at the end of World War I, from 1 January to 31 March 1917. It was re-introduced during World War II for 3 summers from 1 January 1942. It was first introduced in peace time on 31 October 1971. Neither the governing Liberal/Country coalition nor the Labor opposition campaigned on the issue, with the debate taken up by single interest organisations.

=== Yes case ===
The Daylight Savings Association argued that daylight savings (1) reduced power consumption (2) led to more leisure time for outdoor activities and (3) reduced the road toll.

=== No case ===
The Anti-daylight Savings Association's case was that (1) people had difficulty sleeping because their houses did not cool until later in the night (2) country children had to travel to school in the dark and return in the heat of the afternoon (3) Chickens and dairy cows were less productive because of the change of hours of farm hands. Additional arguments put were that children were irritated in the afternoon heat causing more difficulty for young mothers and that adapting to change was difficult for old people.

== The question ==
The voting paper contained the following directions to the elector:

At present there is a period commonly called "daylight saving" by which time is advanced by one hour for the period commencing on the last Sunday in October in each year and ending on the first Sunday in March in the following year.

Are you in favour of daylight saving?

== Results ==
Result
Question		Votes	%
Sunday trading	Yes	1,879,967	68.41
Sunday trading	No	867,983	31.59
Total formal		2,747,950	98.75
Informal		34,696	1.25
Turnout		2,989,786	93.07

== See also ==
- Referendums in New South Wales
- Referendums in Australia
