= Six o'clock swill =

Australian and New Zealand slang term

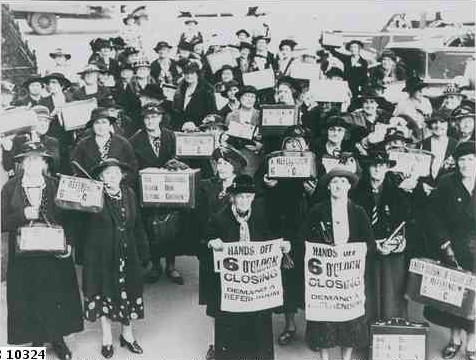
Opposition in South Australia to changes to hotel hours prior to referendum in 1938

"Six o'clock swill" was an Australian and New Zealand slang term for the last-minute rush to buy drinks at a hotel bar before it closed. During a large part of the 20th century, most Australian and New Zealand hotels shut their public bars at 6 pm. A culture of heavy drinking developed during the time between finishing work at 5 pm and the mandatory closing time only an hour later.

== Introduction of early closing ==
Restricted hotel trading hours
Place	Adopted	Abolished
SA	1916	1967
Tas	1916	1937
NSW	1916	1955
Vic	1916	1966
NZ	1917	1967
WA	1917 (9 pm closing)	1959
Qld	1923 (8 pm closing)	1941

Six o'clock closing was introduced during the First World War, partly as an attempt to improve public morality and partly as a war austerity measure. Before this reform, most hotels and public houses in Australia closed their bars at 11 or 11:30 pm. Support for changing hotel closing times originally came from the temperance movement, which hoped that implementing restrictions on the sale of alcohol would lead eventually to its total prohibition. Although the movement had been active since the 1870s, it had been gaining ground since the 1900s following the introduction of 6 o'clock retail trade closing, first legislated in Western Australia in 1897. The argument made by the temperance movement challenged the grounds for public houses being "kept open while bakers' shops were shut". Prominent groups in this movement were the Woman's Christian Temperance Union and the Rechabites. Their agitation was augmented with the outbreak of war in 1914 where it was argued that a "well-ordered, self-disciplined and morally upright home front was a precondition for the successful prosecution of the war."

The first state to introduce early closing was South Australia in March 1916 where the rationale was to reduce drunkenness, and followed a widely subscribed petition. The Council of Churches urged such a measure in support of the war effort, but premier Peake, a teetotal Presbyterian, refused. Such a law was approved in a referendum held in conjunction with the 1915 state election. Six o'clock closing was subsequently adopted in New South Wales, Victoria, and Tasmania in the same year. It was introduced in New Zealand in December 1917. Western Australia adopted a 9 pm closing time, but Queensland retained the old closing times until it introduced 8 o'clock closing in 1923.

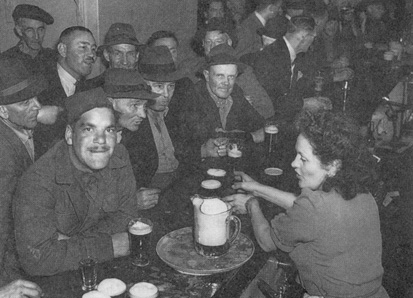
Max Dupain's photograph of A Barmaid at Work in Wartime Sydney. Petty's Hotel, Sydney, 6 pm, 1941.

The question of closing hours was put to New South Wales voters in a referendum held on 10 June 1916. The question had previously been put to the vote in December 1913 when the results of the Local Option Poll were in favour of 11 o'clock closing. The 1916 vote was influenced by a recent riot involving drunken soldiers. In February 1916, troops mutinied against conditions at the Casula Camp. They raided hotels in Liverpool before travelling by train to Sydney, where one soldier was shot dead in a riot at Central Railway station.

Although it was introduced as a temporary measure, it was made permanent in New Zealand in 1918 and in Victoria in 1919. The New South Wales government brought in temporary extensions and discussed putting the matter to a referendum. In 1923, however, without testing the matter by a popular vote, the government enacted 6 pm as the closing time.

== The rush to drink ==
Six o'clock closing often fuelled an hour-long speed-drinking session as men raced to get as drunk as possible in the limited time available. An unintended consequence was that patrons would save their glasses during the hour before closing time until the last call came for drinks, where the glasses would be refilled and patrons attempted to drink them all in the time left. The pressure to serve customers led to innovations such as a pipe from the taps so that the bartender did not need to carry the customer's glass to them.

Hotels catered for the short heavy drinking period after work by extending their bars and tiling walls for easy cleaning. The phenomenon changed Australian and New Zealand pubs as rooms in the building were converted to bar space; billiard rooms and saloon bars disappeared and separate bar counters were combined.

== End of early closing hours ==
ABC news report in 1967, documenting South Australia's changeover away from six o' clock closing

Bar closing times were extended to 10 pm in Tasmania in 1937. Queensland followed suit in December 1941, after opposition within the state government subsided. The issue of ending early closing was put to voters in New South Wales in a referendum in 1947, but it was rejected; in the same year, the Supreme Court of New South Wales ruled that private clubs were exempt from alcohol restrictions, allowing them to trade alcohol legally after 6 pm. A second referendum held in 1954 narrowly passed, and closing hours were extended to 10 pm in New South Wales in the following year. 10 pm closing was restored in Western Australia in 1959, with Victoria following in 1966. South Australia became the last state to abolish six o'clock closing with legislation introduced by Don Dunstan in 1967 and the first legal after-six beer being drunk on 28 September.

Bar closing times were extended to 10 pm in New Zealand on 9 October 1967, three weeks after the 1967 licensing hours referendum. An earlier referendum in 1949 had voted three to one to retain six o'clock closing, but there was a partial repeal of the law in 1961 which allowed restaurants to sell liquor until midnight but not hotel bars.

Early public house closing times had only limited success; they did not have a significant effect on reducing alcohol consumption and probably contributed to the growth of "sly-grog" venues and the illicit alcohol trade. In many cases, patrons would buy alcohol at bottle shops to consume at home after the six o'clock swill. Recent research has indicated that early hotel closing times were indeed effective initially in reducing alcohol consumption levels with consequent improvements in national health indicators. The Great Depression and the Second World War contributed to these trends by lowering disposable income levels, which reduced demand for alcohol. After the Second World War, with the rise in disposable income and expansion in restaurants and purchases of takeaway liquor, the effects of early hotel closing became less clear-cut. By the 1950s, Australia's alcohol consumption levels had returned to pre-First World War levels.

== References in culture ==
The Bar (1954) by John Brack

The Bar (1954), a painting by John Brack which was based on the six o'clock swill, was sold for a record price for an Australian painting of $3.17 million.

Caddie, the Story of a Barmaid, an autobiography of a depression-era barmaid, describes the six o'clock swill, at a time (1952) when it was presumed that the reader would be familiar with the concept.

== See also ==
- Alcohol in Australia
- Alcohol in New Zealand
- List of public house topics
- Longest bar in Australia
- Australian pub
- Temperance movement in Australia
- Temperance movement in New Zealand
