= 1991 Queensland four year terms referendum =

Maximum term of the Parliament of Queensland from three years to four years

Queensland Four-year Term Limits referendum, 1991
- 23 March 1991
- Do you approve of a Bill to extend the maximum term of future Parliaments from three to four years?

Results
Choice	Votes	%
Yes	772,647	48.79%
No	811,078	51.21%

The Queensland parliamentary term extension referendum was a one-question referendum held in the Australian state of Queensland on 23 March 1992. Electors were asked if they approved of extending the maximum term of the Parliament of Queensland from three years to four years. The referendum was conducted by the Electoral Commission Queensland (ECQ).

The referendum failed, with 811,078 No votes (51.1%) received to 772,647 Yes votes (48.9%).

A later 2016 referendum which combined an extension to four years with fixed-term elections was successful.

== See also ==
- 2016 Queensland term length referendum
- 1981 New South Wales referendum
