= 1995 New South Wales referendums =

Referendum on fixed terms of parliament and judicial independence

1995 New South Wales referendum
	Independence of judges	Full 4 year terms
Yes	65.9%	75.5%
No	34.1%	24.5%

Referendums concerning the independence of judges and four-year parliamentary terms were put to New South Wales voters on 25 March 1995. The referendums coincided with that year's New South Wales general election. Both changes had the support of the major political parties and were approved by large majorities.

As of 2026, this is the most recent New South Wales state referendum.

== Independence of judges ==
Voters were asked to strengthen protections of the political independence of judges and magistrates. The text of the question was "Do you approve of the Bill entitled: A Bill for an Act to prevent Parliament from changing laws about the independence of judges and magistrates without a referendum?"

== Four-year terms ==
Voters were asked to fix parliamentary terms at four years. Until then, while the maximum term was four years, premiers would call early elections if the political situation seemed more favourable than it might at the end of the term. This practice was a source of irritation for voters and opposition parties alike. The Fahey coalition government inherited the fixed four-year terms proposal. Fahey's predecessor, Nick Greiner, had promised a referendum on the subject, among other things, to three independents in order to keep office in 1991.

The text of the question was "Do you approve of the Bill entitled: A Bill for an Act to require the Parliament of New South Wales to serve full 4-year terms and to prevent politicians calling early general elections or changing these new constitutional rules without a further referendum?"

== Results ==
Both changes were approved by a large majority.

Result
Question		Votes	%
Independence of judges	Yes	2,225,166	65.90
Independence of judges	No	1,151,255	34.10
Independence of judges	Total Formal	3,376,421	93.81
Independence of judges	Informal	222,720	6.19
Full four year terms	Yes	2,449,796	75.48
Full four year terms	No	795,706	24.52
Full four year terms	Total Formal	3,245,502	90.17
Full four year terms	Informal	353,639	9.83
Turnout (Note: Estimate based on a roll of 3,837,102: Green, Antony. "1995 election totals". New South Wales Election Results 1856-2007. Parliament of New South Wales.)		3,599,141	93.80

== See also ==
- Referendums in New South Wales
- Referendums in Australia
- 1995 New South Wales state election
- Government of New South Wales
