= 1981 New South Wales referendum =

Constitutional Referendum

1981 New South Wales referendum
	4 year terms	Pecuniary interests
Yes	69%	86%
No	31%	14%

The 1981 New South Wales referendum was held on 19 September 1981, the same day as the state election. The referendum contained two questions:

1. Do you approve a Bill for an Act to extend the maximum period between general elections for the Legislative Assembly from 3 years to 4 years?
2. Do you approve a Bill for an Act to require Members of Parliament to disclose certain pecuniary interests and other matters?

== Amendments to the constitution ==
The primary change by the proposal to extend the maximum term was to alter section 7B of the Constitution Act 1902 to provide for a maximum term of 4 years rather than 3.

The proposal to require Members of Parliament to disclose pecuniary interests was to add section 14A to the Constitution Act 1902 which provided that

- the Governor could make regulations requiring members of parliament to disclose their pecuniary interests;
- the relevant house of parliament could declare a seat vacant if the member wilfully contravened any regulation; and
- the regulations could only be disallowed by both houses of parliament.

== Results ==
Both questions were approved with large majorities.

Result
Question		Votes	%
4 year terms	Yes	1,951,455	69.04
4 year terms	No	874,944	30.96
4 year terms	Total Formal	2,826,399	96.53
4 year terms	Informal	101,528	3.47
Pecuniary interests	No	388,791	13.99
Pecuniary interests	Yes	2,391,036	86.01
Pecuniary interests	Total Formal	2,779,827	94.94
Pecuniary interests	Informal	148,100	5.06
Turnout		2,927,927	91.16

== See also ==
- Referendums in New South Wales
- Referendums in Australia
- 2016 Queensland term length referendum
- 1991 Queensland four year terms referendum
