= 2016 Queensland term length referendum =

Parliamentary term referendum in Queensland, Australia

Fixed four-year terms
- 19 March 2016
- A Bill for an Act to provide for fixed four-year terms for the Legislative Assembly in Queensland

Results
Choice	Votes	%
Yes (69 electorates)	1,302,398	52.96%
No (20 electorates)	1,157,043	47.04%
Valid votes	2,459,441	97.05%
Invalid or blank votes	74,728	2.95%
Total votes	2,534,169	100.00%
Registered voters/turnout	3,083,593	82.18%
- Results by electoral district

The 2016 Queensland fixed four-year terms referendum was a one-question referendum held in the Australian state of Queensland on 19 March 2016, in conjunction with the state's local government elections. Electors were asked if they approved of a bill to amend the Constitution of Queensland 2001 and the Constitution Act Amendment Act 1934 to legislate for fixed-term elections for the Legislative Assembly of Queensland, to be held in the last week of October every four years. The referendum was conducted by the Electoral Commission Queensland (ECQ).

The referendum was successful, with just under 53 per cent of electors voting "Yes". It is the third successful Queensland referendum, after the constitutional referendum on Federation in 1899, and the 1910 referendum on religious education in schools. The referendum is also the most recent to be conducted at the state-level by any state in Australia.

== Background ==
Queenslanders had previously voted in a referendum on 23 March 1991 on extending the maximum term of parliament from three to four years (without a fixed term provision). The 1991 referendum failed, with 811,078 No votes (51.1%) received to 772,647 Yes votes (48.9%).

== Arguments ==
The ECQ is required to publish statements for and against the question being put to voters. When the statements were printed and published, supporters of the "No" case complained that the pamphlet for the "Yes" case was more "eye-catching", with a larger, bolder typeface giving their opponents more prominence. The ECQ denied it had given one side more prominence, and that the pamphlets had been written and formatted by members of parliament who had voted for or against the bill to hold the referendum. Shadow attorney-general Ian Walker called the claims of bias a "storm in a teacup".

=== "Yes" case ===
The argument for fixed four-year terms was supported in the parliament by the governing Labor Party, the opposition Liberal National Party and the three independent members of the assembly.

Proponents of the "Yes" case said that four-year fixed terms would reduce the cost of holding elections; provide certainty to business and electors, as well as allow MPs more time for considered policy development; and would take the politics out of the election date being decided by the Premier of the day to their party's advantage.

=== "No" case ===
The argument against fixed four-year terms was supported by Katter's Australian Party.

KAP and other proponents of the "No" case stated that the proposal was wrong for a unicameral parliament without an upper house, and that voters would have to wait longer to vote out a "bad" government. They said there is no guarantee that longer terms would ensure better planning and policy development, and that it would make parliamentarians more complacent and less responsive.

Graeme Orr, professor of law at the University of Queensland, wrote an opinion article on the Brisbane Times online news site titled "Four-year terms in Queensland: Why you should vote no", which argued against the proposal to change.

== Result ==
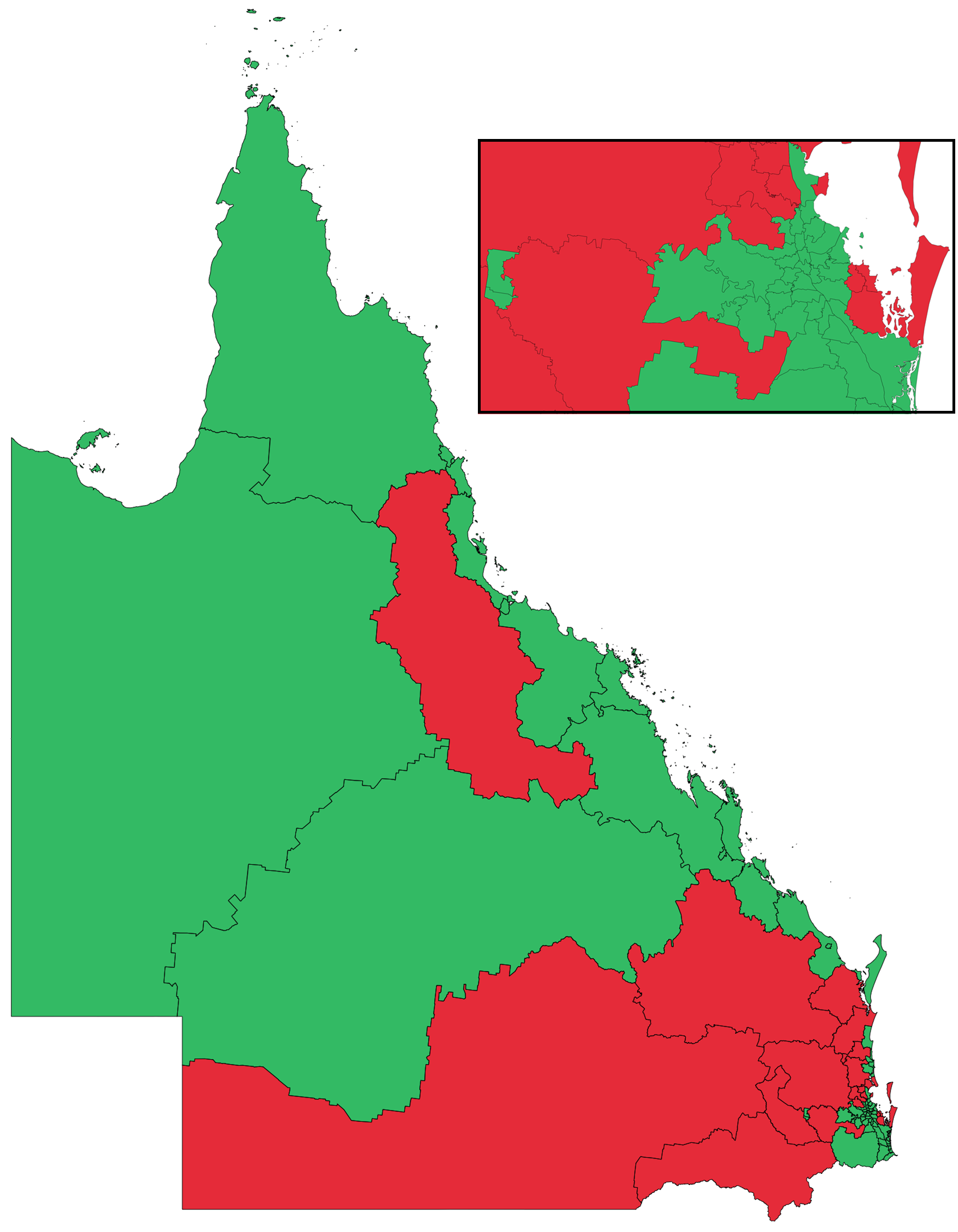
Results by electoral district

On 5 April 2016, the Electoral Commission declared that the referendum had passed, with final counting still under way but with the result beyond doubt. Electoral Commissioner Walter van der Merwe called the result "historic", given that the previous referendum on parliamentary term length in 1991 had failed, and that it was the third successful state referendum in Queensland history.

The final results were 1,302,398 "Yes" votes (52.96%) to 1,157,043 "No" votes (47.04%).

== See also ==
- 1991 Queensland four year terms referendum
- 1981 New South Wales referendum
