= Referendums in New South Wales =

There have been 18 referendums in New South Wales, 8 of which concerned proposals to amend the New South Wales Constitution, half of which concerned the Legislative Council. While the Constitution of Australia was adopted after the 1898 and 1899 referendums in all of the proposed states, the Constitution of New South Wales, promulgated in 1902, was an Act of the Parliament of New South Wales which could be amended by Parliament. Since 1927 the Constitution has included provisions that can only be amended following approval in a referendum. 8 of the referendums, including 5 on the sale of alcohol, did not involve any proposed amendment to the Constitution. While these have traditionally been called referendums, they could also be described as plebiscites.

Local Government Areas (also known as Councils or LGAs) can also propose Constitutional amendments such as when the Council wants to make changes to the method by which the Mayor is elected to office by direct election or indirect election by the Councillors. Councils may also conduct polls which are optional to vote in and may be limited to certain voters on a proposal to gain community opinion on building infrastructure or other matters, the result of these polls (like a plebiscite) is non-binding on the Council.

== Alteration of the Constitution ==
The Constitution Act 1902 as made in 1902 was an Act of the New South Wales Parliament. In contrast to the Constitution of Australia it was not approved by a referendum and did not contain any provision requiring a referendum to alter it. In 1929 the parliament passed an amendment to the Constitution Act which inserted section 7A, requiring a referendum before the Legislative Council could be abolished. In 1930 Labor MLCs put forward two bills, one to repeal section 7A, the other to abolish the Council. Believing that a referendum was necessary before the bills could become law, the Legislative Council permitted the bills to pass without a division on 10 December. The validity of section 7A and the inability to repeal the section without a referendum were upheld by the Supreme Court on 23 December 1930, a majority of the High Court on 16 March 1931, and the Judicial Committee of the Privy Council on 31 May 1932.

As of December 2024, the Constitution Act 1902 has been amended through Parliament by the following Acts:

Act	Ref
Parliamentary Elections Act 1906	
Parliamentary Representatives Allowance Act 1907	
Parliamentary Representatives Allowance Act 1912	
Parliamentary Electorates and Elections Act 1912	
Parliamentary Representatives Allowance and Ministers' Salaries (Amendment) Act 1920	
Parliamentary Allowances and Salaries Act 1922	
Parliamentary Allowances and Salaries Act 1925	
Constitution (Amendment) Act 1925 (Note: Took effect in 1926)	
Audit (Amendment) Act 1929	
Constitution (Legislative Council) Amendment Act 1929	
Parliamentary Allowances and Salaries Act 1930	
Parliamentary Allowances and Salaries Act 1932	
Constitution Amendment (Legislative Council) Act, 1932 (Note: Act received Royal Assent in 1933.)	
Demise of the Crown (Amendment) Act 1936	
Parliamentary Allowances and Salaries Act 1938	
Parliamentary Allowances and Salaries Act 1947	
Constitution Amendment (Legislative Council Members Allowances) Act 1948	
Parliamentary Allowances and Salaries Act 1951	
Parliamentary Allowances and Salaries Act 1956	
Parliamentary Allowances and Salaries Act 1959	
Constitution (Amendment) Act 1962	
Parliamentary Allowances and Salaries (Amendment) Act 1963	
Decimal Currency Act 1965	
Parliamentary Allowances and Salaries (Amendment) Act 1966	
Constitution (Amendment) Act 1968	
Parliamentary Allowances and Salaries (Amendment) Act 1971	
Reprints Act 1972	
Parliamentary Allowances and Salaries (Amendment) Act 1974	
Parliamentary Allowances and Salaries (Amendment) Act 1975	
Parliamentary Remuneration Tribunal Act 1975	
Constitution and Other Acts (Amendment) Act 1975	
Constitution (Ministers of the Crown) Amendment Act 1976	
Constitution (Amendment) Act 1978	
Constitution and Parliamentary Electorates and Elections (Amendment) Act 1978	
Constitution (Amendment) Act 1979	
Constitution (Public Service) Amendment Act 1979	
Constitution (Amendment) Act 1980	
Constitution (Legislative Assembly) Amendment Act 1981 (Note: Act received Royal Assent in 1982 following referendum.)	
Constitution (Disclosures by Members) Amendment Act 1981	
Constitution (Consolidated Fund) Amendment Act 1982	
Miscellaneous Acts (Public Finance and Audit) Repeal and Amendment Act 1983	
Constitution (Enrolment of Acts) Amendment Act 1984	
Statute Law (Miscellaneous Amendments) Act 1984	
Statute Law (Miscellaneous Provisions) Act 1986	
Constitution (Amendment) Act 1986	
Constitution (Local Government) Amendment Act 1986	
Statute Law (Miscellaneous Provisions) Act (No 1) 1987	
Constitution (Amendment) Act 1987	
Constitution (Parliamentary Secretaries) Amendment Act 1988	
Constitution (Governor's Salary) Amendment Act 1988	
Constitution (Legislative Assembly) Amendment Act 1990	
Constitution and Parliamentary Electorates and Elections (Amendment) Act 1990	
Statute Law (Miscellaneous Provisions) Act 1991	
Constitution (Legislative Council) Amendment Act 1991	
Constitution (Legislative Council) Further Amendment Act 1991	
Constitution (Amendment) Act 1992	
Constitution (Fixed Term Parliaments) Amendment Act 1993 (Note: Act received Royal Assent in 1995 following referendum.)	
Constitution (Entrenchment) Amendment Act 1992	
Public Sector Management Amendment Act 1995	
Industrial Relations Act 1996	
Constitution and Parliamentary Electorates and Elections Amendment Act 1997	
Statute Law (Miscellaneous Provisions) Act 1999	
Crimes Legislation Amendment (Sentencing) Act 1999	
Constitution Amendment Act 2000	
Constitution Amendment (Governor's Salary) Act 2003	
Courts Legislation Amendment Act 2005	
Constitution Amendment (Pledge of Loyalty) Act 2006	
Constitution Amendment (Governor) Act 2006	
Statute Law (Miscellaneous Provisions) Act 2007	
Constitution Amendment (Speaker) Act 2007	
Miscellaneous Acts (Local Court) Amendment Act 2007	
Statute Law (Miscellaneous Provisions) Act (No 2) 2008	
Children Legislation Amendment (Wood Inquiry Recommendations) Act 2009	
Parliamentary Remuneration Amendment (Salary Packaging) Act 2009	
Constitution Amendment (Lieutenant-Governor) Act 2009	
Constitution Amendment (Recognition of Aboriginal People) Act 2010	
Constitution Amendment (Prorogation of Parliament) Act 2011	
Constitution Amendment (Restoration of Oaths of Allegiance) Act 2012	
Government Sector Employment Act 2013	
Statute Law (Miscellaneous Provisions) Act 2014	
Constitution Amendment (Parliamentary Presiding Officers) Act 2014	
Government Sector Employment Legislation Amendment Act 2016	
Crown Land Legislation Amendment Act 2017	
Electoral Act 2017	
COVID-19 Legislation Amendment (Emergency Measures) Act 2020	
COVID-19 Legislation Amendment (Stronger Communities and Health) Act 2021	
COVID-19 and Other Legislation Amendment (Regulatory Reforms) Act 2022	
Constitution Amendment (Virtual Attendance) Act 2022	
Constitution Amendment (Appointment of Lieutenant-Governor and Administrator) Act 2022	
Integrity Legislation Amendment Act 2022	
Constitution Amendment (Sydney Water and Hunter Water) Act 2023	
Constitution Amendment (Executive Council) Act 2024	
Government Sector Employment and Other Legislation Amendment Act 2024	

== List of referendums ==
Results of referendums
Year	#	Name	Option	Amend Constitution	Yes % (Note: Where there are options, this is the percentage for the option with the highest number of votes.)	No % (Note: Where there are options, this is the percentage for all other options.)	Ref
1898		Federation of Australia (Note: The enabling legislation in New South Wales required a minimum of 80,000 votes in support, however there were only 71,595 support votes.)			51.95	48.53	
1899		Federation of Australia			56.49	43.51	
1903	1	Number of Members of the Legislative Assembly	Reduce to 90	✗	72.95	17.05	
1916	2	Licensed premises closing hour	6 pm	✗	62.18	37.82	
1928	3	Prohibition with compensation		✗	28.74	71.26	
1933	4	Reform the Legislative Council		✓	51.47	48.53	
1947	5	Licensed premises and clubs closing hour	6 pm	✗	62.46	37.54	
1954	6	Licensed premises and clubs closing hour	10 pm	✗	50.27	49.73	
1961	7	Abolish the Legislative Council		✓	42.42	57.58	
1967	8	New England new state (Note: the referendum was limited to electors in the proposed new state.)		✗	45.82	54.18	
1969	9	Sunday trading for hotels		✗	42.03	57.97	
1976	10	Daylight saving		✗	68.41	32.59	
1978	11	Election of Legislative Council		✓	84.81	15.19	
1981	12	4 year terms		✓	69.04	30.96	
1981	13	Disclosure of pecuniary interests		✓	86.01	13.99	
1991	14	Reduce size of Legislative Council		✓	57.73	42.27	
1995	15	Fixed terms of parliament		✓	75.48	24.52	
1995	16	Judicial independence		✓	65.90	34.10	

== See also ==
- Referendums in Australia
- Government of New South Wales
- Elections in New South Wales
