= 1916 New South Wales closing hour referendum =

1916 New South Wales referendum
Closing hour	Vote %
6:00 pm	62.2%
Later times	37.8%

A referendum concerning the closing hour for licensed premises and registered clubs was put to voters on 10 June 1916. The referendum was conducted on the basis of optional preferential voting. Preferences were not counted as a majority voted for 6:00 pm closing time.

== Background ==
Six o'clock closing was introduced during the First World War, partly as an attempt to improve public morality and partly as a war austerity measure. Before this reform, most hotels and public houses in Australia closed their bars at 11 or 11:30 pm. Support for changing hotel closing times originally came from the temperance movement, which hoped that implementing restrictions on the sale of alcohol would lead eventually to its total prohibition. Although the movement had been active since the 1870s, it had been gaining ground since the 1900s following the introduction of 6 o'clock retail trade closing, first legislated in Western Australia in 1897. The argument made by the temperance movement challenged the grounds for public houses being "kept open while bakers' shops were shut". Prominent groups in this movement were the Woman's Christian Temperance Union and the Rechabites. Their agitation was augmented with the outbreak of war in 1914 where it was argued that a "well-ordered, self-disciplined and morally upright home front was a precondition for the successful prosecution of the war."

The first state to introduce early closing was South Australia in March 1916 where the rationale was to reduce drunkenness, and followed a widely subscribed petition. The Council of Churches urged such a measure in support of the war effort, but premier Peake, a teetotal Presbyterian, refused. Such a law was approved in a referendum held in conjunction with the 1915 state election. Six o'clock closing was subsequently adopted in New South Wales, Victoria, and Tasmania in the same year. It was introduced in New Zealand in December 1917. Western Australia adopted a 9 pm closing time, but Queensland retained the old closing times until it introduced 8 o'clock closing in 1923.

The question of closing hours was put to New South Wales voters in a referendum held on 10 June 1916. The question had previously been put to the vote in December 1913 when the results of the Local Option Poll were in favour of 11 o'clock closing. The 1916 vote was influenced by a recent riot involving drunken soldiers. In February 1916, troops mutinied against conditions at the Casula Camp. They raided hotels in Liverpool before travelling by train to Sydney, where one soldier was shot dead in a riot at Central Railway station.

== The question ==
The voting paper was:

Order of Preference	Closing hour
	Six o'clock
	Seven o'clock
	Eight o'clock
	Nine o'clock
	Ten o'clock
	Eleven o'clock

Indicate your vote by placing the figure 1 in the square opposite the closing hour for which you vote in the first instance, and as your first preference.

You may, in addition, indicate in the order of your preference which of the other closing hours you prefer (in the event of the hour for which you first vote not getting a majority) by placing the figures 2, 3, 4, 5, 6, or any of such figures, in the squares opposite the other closing hours, thereby indicating the order of your preference.

It is not necessary to vote for more than one closing hour, but the hour for which you first vote must have against it the figure 1.

The vote for any preference after the first will only be counted in the event of there not being a majority of votes in favour of any of your prior preferences.

== Results ==
The referendum was overwhelmingly in favour of 6:00 pm closing time.

Result
Question		Votes	%
What should be the closing hour of licensed premises	6:00 pm	325,121	62.18
What should be the closing hour of licensed premises	7:00 pm	5,068	0.97
What should be the closing hour of licensed premises	8:00 pm	20,103	3.84
What should be the closing hour of licensed premises	9:00 pm	168,162	32.16
What should be the closing hour of licensed premises	10:00 pm	1,494	0.29
What should be the closing hour of licensed premises	11:00 pm	2,933	0.56
Total formal votes		522,881	95.93
Informal votes		22,208	4.07
Turnout		545,089	52.51

== Aftermath ==
Although it was introduced as a temporary measure, the government brought in extensions and discussed putting the matter to a referendum. In 1923, however, without testing the matter by a popular vote, the Fuller Nationalist government enacted 6 pm as the closing time.

This was the first of three referendums concerning the closing hour for licensed premises and clubs.

Closing hour referendum results
Referendum	6:00 pm	7:00 pm	8:00 pm	9:00 pm	10:00 pm	11:00 pm
(2) 1916 Licensed premises closing hour	62.18%	0.97%	3.84%	32.16%	0.29%	0.56%
(5) 1947 Licensed premises and clubs closing hour	62.44%			1.60%	35.96%	
(6) 1954 Licensed premises and clubs closing hour	49.73%				50.27%	

== See also ==
- Referendums in New South Wales
