= 1954 New South Wales closing hour referendum =

- 13 November 1954
- The question is the closing hour for premises and clubs licensed under the Liquor Act, 1912: 6 pm or 10 pm ?

Results
Choice	Votes	%
Six o'clock p.m.	892,740	49.73%
Ten o'clock p.m.	902,532	50.27%
Valid votes	1,795,272	97.72%
Invalid or blank votes	41,794	2.28%
Total votes	1,837,066	100.00%
Registered voters/turnout	1,852,787	99.15%

A referendum concerning the closing hour for licensed premises and registered clubs was put to voters in New South Wales on 13 November 1954.

== Background ==
Six o'clock closing was introduced in New South Wales during the First World War following the 1916 referendum. The 1916 vote was influenced by a recent riot involving drunken soldiers. In February 1916, troops mutinied against conditions at the Casula Camp. They raided hotels in Liverpool before travelling by train to Sydney, where one soldier was shot dead in a riot at Central Railway station. Although it was introduced as a temporary measure, the government brought in extensions and discussed putting the matter to a referendum. In 1923, however, without testing the matter by a popular vote, the Fuller Nationalist government enacted 6 pm as the closing time.

== The question ==
The voting paper was:

The elector shall indicate his vote by placing the number "1" in the square opposite the closing hour for which he desires to give his first preference vote, and the number "2" in the remaining square.

Order of Preference	Closing hour
	Six o'clock
	Ten o'clock

== Results ==
The referendum was narrowly in favour of 10:00 pm closing time.

Result
Question		Votes	%
What should be the closing hour of licensed premises	6:00 pm	892,740	49.73
What should be the closing hour of licensed premises	10:00 pm	902,532	50.27
Total formal votes		1,795,272	97.72
Informal votes		41,794	2.28
Turnout		1,837,066	94.02

== Aftermath ==
This was the third of three referendums concerning the closing hour for licensed premises and clubs.

Closing hour referendum results
Referendum	6:00 pm	7:00 pm	8:00 pm	9:00 pm	10:00 pm	11:00 pm
(2) 1916 Licensed premises closing hour	62.18%	0.97%	3.84%	32.16%	0.29%	0.56%
(5) 1947 Licensed premises and clubs closing hour	62.44%			1.60%	35.96%	
(6) 1954 Licensed premises and clubs closing hour	49.73%				50.27%	

== See also ==
- Referendums in New South Wales
