= 1947 New South Wales closing hour referendum =

- 15 February 1947
- The question is the closing hour for premises and clubs licensed under the Liquor Act, 1912: 6 pm or 9 pm or 10 pm ?

Results
Choice	Votes	%
6:00 pm	1,050,260	62.44%
9:00 pm	26,954	1.60%
10:00 pm	604,833	35.96%
Valid votes	1,682,047	99.11%
Invalid or blank votes	15,183	0.89%
Total votes	1,697,230	100.00%
Registered voters/turnout	1,852,787	91.6%

A referendum concerning the closing hour for licensed premises and registered clubs was put to voters on 15 February 1947. The referendum was conducted on the basis of optional preferential voting. Preferences were not counted as a majority voted to maintain the 6:00 pm closing time.

== Background ==
Six o'clock closing was introduced in New South Wales during the First World War following the 1916 referendum. The 1916 vote was influenced by a recent riot involving drunken soldiers. In February 1916, troops mutinied against conditions at the Casula Camp. They raided hotels in Liverpool before travelling by train to Sydney, where one soldier was shot dead in a riot at Central Railway station. Although it was introduced as a temporary measure, the government brought in extensions and discussed putting the matter to a referendum. In 1923, however, without testing the matter by a popular vote, the Fuller Nationalist government enacted 6 pm as the closing time.

== The question ==
The voting paper was:

The elector shall indicate his vote by placing the number "1" in the square opposite the closing hour for which he desires to give his first preference vote, and shall give contingent votes for all the remaining closing hours by placing the numbers "2," and "3" in the squares opposite those closing hours respectively, so as to indicate by numerical sequence the order of his preference for them.

Order of Preference	Closing hour
	Six o'clock
	Nine o'clock
	Ten o'clock

== Results ==
The referendum was overwhelmingly in favour of 6:00 pm closing time.

Result
Question		Votes	%
What should be the closing hour of licensed premises	6:00 pm	1,050,260	62.44
What should be the closing hour of licensed premises	9:00 pm	26,954	1.60
What should be the closing hour of licensed premises	10:00 pm	604,833	35.96
Total formal votes		1,682,047	99.11
Informal votes		15,183	0.89
Turnout		1,697,230	91.60

== Aftermath ==
This was the second of three referendums concerning the closing hour for licensed premises and clubs.

Closing hour referendum results
Referendum	6:00 pm	7:00 pm	8:00 pm	9:00 pm	10:00 pm	11:00 pm
(2) 1916 Licensed premises closing hour	62.18%	0.97%	3.84%	32.16%	0.29%	0.56%
(5) 1947 Licensed premises and clubs closing hour	62.44%			1.60%	35.96%	
(6) 1954 Licensed premises and clubs closing hour	49.73%				50.27%	

== See also ==
- Referendums in New South Wales
