= Liverpool riot of 1916 =

Riot in Central station, Sydney, Australia

Battle of Central Station
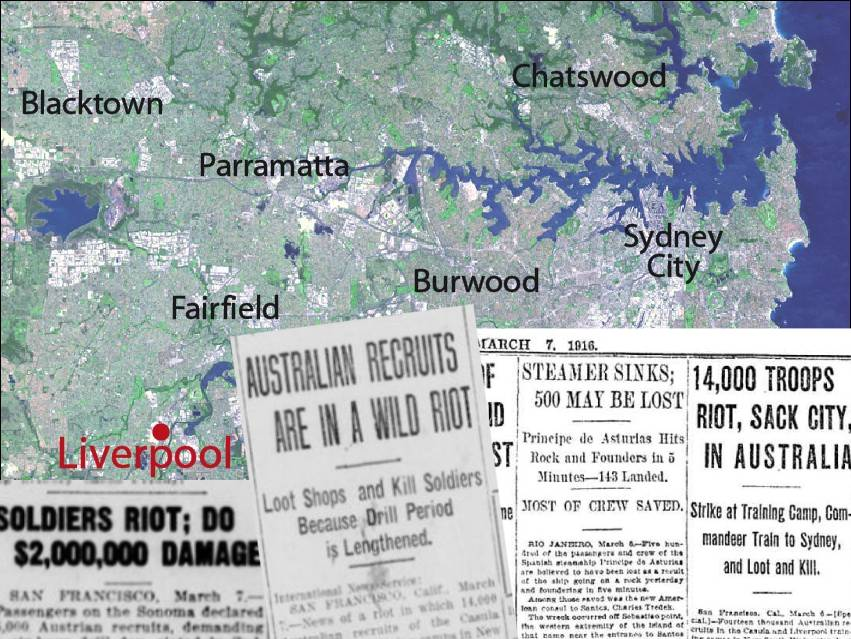
- US news coverage of the 1916 Liverpool Riots
- Date: 14 February 1916
- Location: Sydney, New South Wales, Australia
- Methods: Rioting, protests, looting, attacks

Parties
Rioting soldiers	Australian Army (Australia) Australian citizens

Casualties and losses
1 killed (Gnr Edward S. Webster)	
- Many injuries

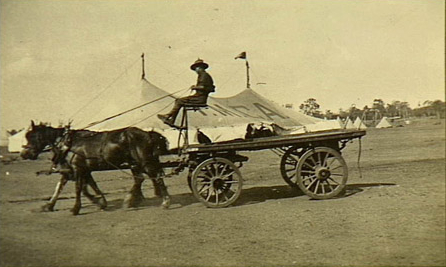
Casula Camp, the spark of the riot

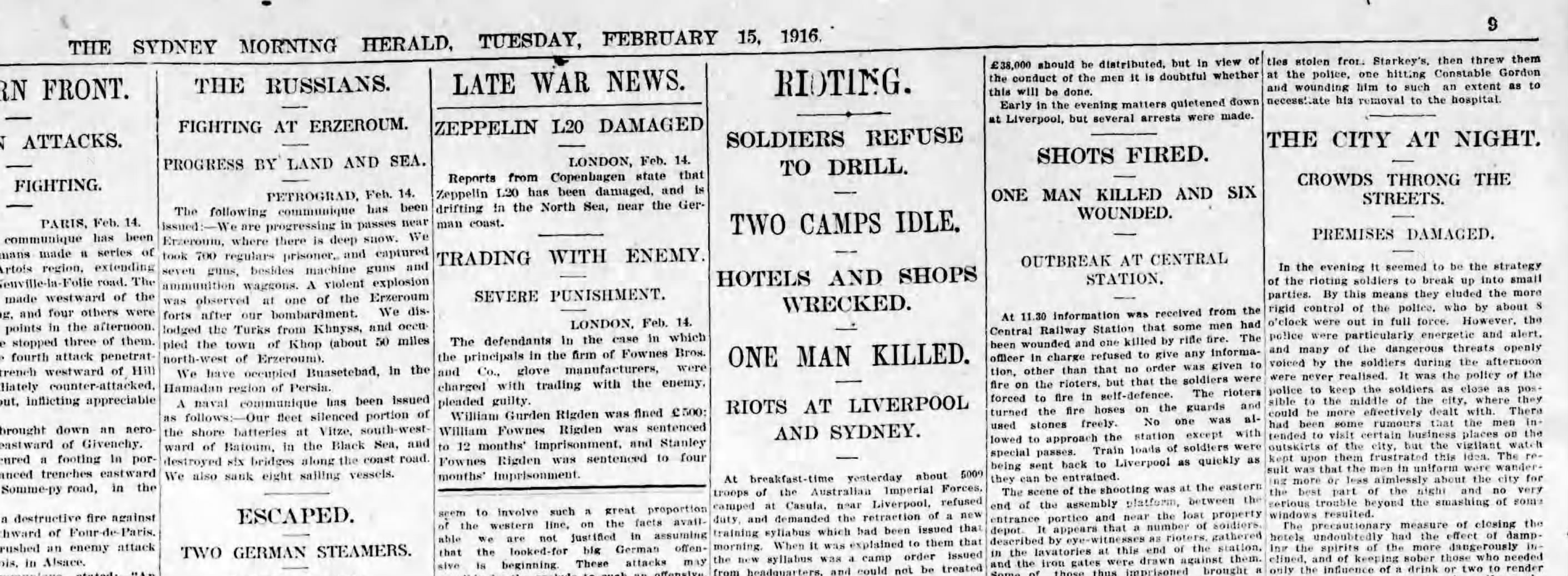
SMH news reports of the riot

The Liverpool riot of 1916 also known as the Battle of Central Station was an event in Sydney, Australia where a large group of Australian soldiers rioted through the streets of Sydney and surrounding areas on 14 February 1916 and into the early morning of 15 February.

There had been an earlier riot by soldiers in the city on 13 December 1915.

== Background ==
Following Australia's entry into World War I, many Australian men volunteered to fight in Europe and were stationed in camps around Australia to receive military training before being shipped to the front. Issues at the Casula Camp in Liverpool in Sydney's south west had resulted in the appointment of George Rich, a High Court judge, to conduct a Royal Commission on the military camp. The report of the Royal Commission, published on 20 August 1915 included the following:

Drink. The evidence before me was that the liquor sold at Liverpool and the vicinity was free from adulteration and up to standard, except in one instance, where the sample taken was five points below standard, the dilution being water. I have no evidence as to the purity of liquor sold elsewhere, except that the effect of some of the liquor on the men was so extraordinary as to suggest alcoholic poisoning. The effect of excessive drink is to impair the efficiency of the soldiers, and endanger their health in the way I have mentioned above, and to expose them to temptations they might otherwise avoid.

If all hotels were closed to soldiers for the sale of liquor it is a matter of policy about which I express no opinion whether a wet canteen should be allowed where the quality and quantity of liquor are under strict control, and the profits are paid back to the soldiers, or a canteen should be established in which liquor would be supplied under a doctor's order, or what other steps should be taken to supervise effectively the sale of drink.

...

6. Public Houses

All public houses throughout the Commonwealth should be closed to soldiers for the sale of liquor. Alternatively the public houses at Liverpool and within a radius of five miles of the Camp, should be closed to soldiers at 6 o'clock. (See War Precautions Regulations 1915, r. 12).

Pickets should be placed in or near the hotels and instructed to see that no drink is carried away from the hotels by the soldiers in bottles or other receptacles for liquor.

A further alternative is to place these hotels out of bounds. The sale of liquor to civilians and smuggling by them to soldiers should be strictly prevented.

== Casula Camp riot ==
At 9.00am on 14 February 1916, at Casula Camp, it was announced to the recruits that the current training session would be extended into the evening, meaning a 27-hour stretch for some of the recruits. Five thousand recruits refused to accept extra duty and went on strike to protest the poor conditions at the camp. The soldiers left the camp and marched towards the centre of Liverpool, where they were joined by other recruits from camps around the area. The number of protesters now reached as many as 15,000. They invaded a number of local hotels, drinking the bars dry, refusing to pay and started to vandalise buildings.

The soldiers then gained control of Liverpool train station, overpowered the engineers and commandeered trains heading towards Sydney, where they began rampaging drunkenly through Sydney streets, smashing windows and targeting anyone with a foreign-sounding name, including Italian restaurants, even though Italy was an ally of Australia in the war. Shops and hotels were looted and people were forced to take refuge in churches to avoid the soldiers. Police reinforcements were called in and began battling the soldiers in the streets of Sydney.

At Sydney's Central Railway Station, armed military guards found a group of over a hundred drunken soldiers destroying a toilet block and demanded they surrender. A shot was fired by a rioting soldier over the guards' heads and in response the guards returned fire, killing one soldier and seriously injuring eight others. This incident had a sobering effect on the soldiers and many began surrendering to police and military guards, although small bands of soldiers continued to cause damage throughout the night.

Following the riot, described as the "most disgraceful episode in our military history", about a thousand soldiers were court-martialled and either gaoled or discharged from the army. However, Australia was desperate for recruits to fight the war, so many soldiers escaped punishment and were sent overseas while the government, anxious to keep the image of the Australian digger as positive as possible, discouraged the media from covering the event.

== Aftermath ==
As a result of the riots, New South Wales, Victoria and Tasmania introduced 6.00 p.m. closing of hotels to guard against a repeat occurrence, matching South Australia's introduction the previous year. It was not until 1955 that New South Wales closing was extended to 10 p.m.

The only remaining physical evidence of the riot is a bullet hole, in marble stonework near the entrance to Platform 1, at Central railway station, Sydney.
