= List of acts of the Parliament of Victoria from 1923 =

This is a list of acts of the Parliament of Victoria, Australia for the year 1923.

== 1923 ==
Short title, or popular name	Citation	Royal assent
Long title
Imperial Acts Application Act 1922	13 Geo. V. No. 3270	25 May 1923 (Note: This act was reserved for approval by His Majesty.)
An Act to declare that certain Enactments of the Parliament of England and of the Parliament of Great Britain and of the Parliament of the United Kingdom of Great Britain and Ireland in force at the time of the passing of the Act 9 George IV. c. LXXXIII. (Note: Australian Courts Act 1828 (9 Geo. 4. c. 83 (Imp))) shall not apply in Victoria and to transcribe or consolidate other Enactments of such Parliaments and for other purposes.
	14 Geo. V. No. 3271	12 July 1923
An Act to apply out of the Consolidated Revenue the sum of Three million three hundred thousand five hundred and sixteen pounds to the service of the year One thousand nine hundred and twenty-three and One thousand nine hundred and twenty-four.
	14 Geo. V. No. 3272	26 July 1923
An Act to apply out of the Consolidated Revenue the sum of Three hundred and eighty-five thousand seven hundred and sixty-two pounds to the service of the year One thousand nine hundred and twenty-two and One thousand nine hundred and twenty-three.
	14 Geo. V. No. 3273	5 September 1923
An Act to apply out of the Consolidated Revenue the sum of One million one hundred and seventy-two thousand and seventy-nine pounds to the service of the year One thousand nine hundred and twenty-three and One thousand nine hundred and twenty-four.
Narre Worran Land Act 1923 (repealed)	14 Geo. V. No. 3277	4 October 1923
An Act to revoke the Permanent Reservation of Portion of certain Land in the Parish of Narre Worran as a Site for Police Purposes. (Repealed by Statute Law Revision Act 1984 (No. 10087))
	14 Geo. V. No. 3280	4 October 1923
An Act to apply out of the Consolidated Revenue the sum of One million one hundred and fifteen thousand six hundred and forty-seven pounds to the service of the year One thousand nine hundred and twenty-three and One thousand nine hundred and twenty-four.
University Act 1923	14 Geo. V. No. 3285	23 October 1923
An Act relating to the University of Melbourne.
	14 Geo. V. No. 3291	1 November 1923
An Act to apply out of the Consolidated Revenue the sum of One million three hundred and fifty-one thousand pounds to the service of the year One thousand nine hundred and twenty-three and One thousand nine hundred and twenty-four.
Victorian Government Stock Act 1923 (repealed)	14 Geo. V. No. 3297	30 November 1923
An Act to amend the Victorian Government Stock Act 1896. (Note: Victorian Government Stock Act 1896 (60 Vict. No. 1468)) (Repealed by Treasury Legislation (Repeal) Act 2005 (No. 73 of 2005))
	14 Geo. V. No. 3301	30 November 1923
An Act to apply out of the Consolidated Revenue the sum of One million two hundred and ninety-four thousand three hundred and sixty-four pounds to the service of the year One thousand nine hundred and twenty-three and One thousand nine hundred and twenty-four.
Land Act 1923	14 Geo. V. No. 3302	18 December 1923
An Act to amend the Land Acts.
Goroke to Morea Railway Construction Act 1923 (repealed)	14 Geo. V. No. 3312	22 December 1923
An Act to authorize the Construction by the State of a Line of Railway from Goroke to Morea. (Repealed by Transport Act 1983 (No. 9921))
Land Tax Act 1923	14 Geo. V. No. 3314	22 December 1923
An Act to declare the Rate of Land Tax for the year ending the thirty-first day of December One thousand nine hundred and twenty-four.
Fire Brigades Act 1923 (repealed)	14 Geo. V. No. 3321	22 December 1923
An Act to authorize the Metropolitan Fire Brigades Board to borrow a Sum of Thirty-five thousand pounds and to amend the Fire Brigades Act 1915 (Note: Fire Brigades Act 1915 (6 Geo. V. No. 2653)) and for other purposes. (Repealed by Statute Law Revision Act 1984 (No. 10087))
Moorpanyal Lands Act 1923 (repealed)	14 Geo. V. No. 3325	22 December 1923
An Act to divest out of The Geelong Harbor Trust Commissioners certain Land in the Parish of Moorpanyal and to revoke the Permanent Reservation of certain other Land in the said Parish and to provide for the Grant to the Commonwealth of Australia as a Site for a Base for Seaplanes of the Australian Air Force of the said Lands and in pursuance of an Arrangement with the Commonwealth for the Exchange of certain Lands in the said Parish to close certain Roads and for other purposes. (Repealed by Statute Law Revision Act 1984 (No. 10087))
Geelong Land Act 1923 (repealed)	14 Geo. V. No. 3327	22 December 1923
An Act to provide for the granting of a Lease of certain Crown Land at Geelong in the Parish of Moorpanyal in the County of Grant to The Phosphate Co-operative Company of Australia limited. (Repealed by Statute Law Revision Act 1984 (No. 10087))
Electoral Act 1923	14 Geo. V. No. 3331	22 December 1923
An Act to amend the Law relating to Parliamentary Elections.
	14 Geo. V. No. 3336	22 December 1923
An Act to apply a sum out of the Consolidated Revenue to the service of the year ending on the thirtieth day of June One thousand nine hundred and twenty-four and to appropriate the Supplies granted in this Session of Parliament.
Black Rock to Beaumaris Electric Street Railway Act 1923	14 Geo. V. No.	
Bowser to Peechelba Railway Construction Act 1923	14 Geo. V. No.	
Closer Settlement Act 1923	14 Geo. V. No.	
Country Roads Act 1923	14 Geo. V. No.	
Electricity Supply Loan Application Act 1923	14 Geo. V. No.	
Friendly Societies Act 1923	14 Geo. V. No.	
Fruit Act 1923	14 Geo. V. No.	
Housing and Reclamation Act 1923	14 Geo. V. No.	
Income Tax Act 1923	14 Geo. V. No.	
Income Tax Acts Amendment Act 1923	14 Geo. V. No.	
Inebriates Act 1923	14 Geo. V. No.	
Kanagulk to Edenhope Railway Construction Act 1923	14 Geo. V. No.	
Kooloonong to West Narrung Railway Construction Act 1923	14 Geo. V. No.	
Local Government (Borrowing Powers) Act 1923	14 Geo. V. No.	
Lunacy Act 1923	14 Geo. V. No.	
Marine Act 1923	14 Geo. V. No.	
Marnoo to Wallaloo Railway Construction Act 1923	14 Geo. V. No.	
Marriage Act 1923	14 Geo. V. No.	
Melbourne and Metropolitan Tramways Act 1923	14 Geo. V. No.	
Metropolitan Drainage and Rivers Act 1923	14 Geo. V. No.	
Mining Development Act 1923	14 Geo. V. No.	
Municipal Endowment Act 1923	14 Geo. V. No.	
Newmerella Land Act 1923	14 Geo. V. No.	
Nurses Registration Act 1923	14 Geo. V. No.	
Parliamentary Elections (Women Candidates) Act 1923	14 Geo. V. No.	
Parliamentary Witnesses Act 1923	14 Geo. V. No.	
Police Pensions Act 1923	14 Geo. V. No.	
Public Safety Preservation Act 1923	14 Geo. V. No.	
Railway Loan Application Act 1923	14 Geo. V. No.	
Railways Advances (Stores Suspense Account) Act 1923	14 Geo. V. No.	
Railways Classification Board Act 1923	14 Geo. V. No.	
Railways Sinking Fund Act 1923	14 Geo. V. No.	
Railways Standing Committee Act 1923	14 Geo. V. No.	
River Murray Waters Act 1923	14 Geo. V. No.	
Smeaton Land Act 1923	14 Geo. V. No.	
Smeaton Show Yards Lands Act 1923	14 Geo. V. No.	
St. Arnaud School of Mines Site Act 1923	14 Geo. V. No.	
State Savings Bank Act 1923	14 Geo. V. No.	
Supreme Court Act 1923	14 Geo. V. No.	
Surplus Revenue Act 1923	14 Geo. V. No.	
Tarranginnie Land Act 1923	14 Geo. V. No.	
Toonallook Land Act 1923	14 Geo. V. No.	
Treasury Bills and Advances Act 1923	14 Geo. V. No.	
Victorian Government Loan Act 1923	14 Geo. V. No.	
Victorian Loan (Public Works) Act 1923	14 Geo. V. No.	
Victorian Loan Act 1923	14 Geo. V. No.	
Water Supply Loans Application Act 1923	14 Geo. V. No.	
Werrimul to The Hut Railway Construction Act 1923	14 Geo. V. No.	
Witchipool Land Act 1923	14 Geo. V. No.	
Wyndham Race-course Act 1923	14 Geo. V. No.	

== Sources ==
- "1923 Victorian Historical Acts". AustLII.
