= List of acts of the Parliament of Victoria from 1938 =

This is a list of acts of the Parliament of Victoria, Australia for the year 1938.

== 1938 ==
Short title, or popular name	Citation	Royal assent
Long title
Constitution (Reform) Act 1937	No. 4533	30 March 1938 (Note: This act was reserved for His Majesty's approval.)
An Act to make Provision with respect to the Relations between the two Houses of Parliament, and for other purposes.
	No. 4534	30 June 1938
An Act to apply out of the Consolidated Revenue the sum of Two million six hundred and sixty-nine thousand one hundred and forty-one pounds to the service of the year One thousand nine hundred and thirty-eight and One thousand nine hundred and thirty-nine.
Royal Melbourne Hospital Act 1938	No. 4536	1 August 1938
An Act to enable The Royal Melbourne Hospital to borrow certain Moneys by the Issue of Debentures and to empower the Treasurer of Victoria on behalf of the Government of Victoria to guarantee the Repayment of such Moneys and Interest thereon and for other purposes.
Williamstown Temperance Hall Act 1938	No. 4538	8 August 1938
An Act to revoke the Reservation of certain Land in the City of Williamstown permanently reserved as a Site for a Temperance Hall, to revoke the Crown Grant of the said Land and to provide for the Sale thereof by Public Auction, and for other purposes.
Brighton Land Act 1938	No. 4539	8 August 1938
An Act to provide for the Crown Grant to the Mayor Councillors and Citizens of the City of Brighton of certain Land in the said City.
Warrnambool Land Act 1938	No. 4541	8 August 1938
An Act to provide, upon the Transfer and Surrender of certain Land in the City of Warrnambool to His Majesty, for the Reservation of such Land as a Site for a Shire Hall and Offices, and for the Revocation of the Reservation of certain other Land in the said City permanently reserved as a Site for a Shire Hall and Offices and for the Subdivision and Sale of such Land and for the Application of the Proceeds of such Sale, and for other purposes.
	No. 4542	22 August 1938
An Act to apply out of the Consolidated Revenue the sum of Five hundred and one thousand four hundred and one pounds to the service of the year One thousand nine hundred and thirty-seven and One thousand nine hundred and thirty-eight.
	No. 4544	31 August 1938
An Act to apply out of the Consolidated Revenue the sum of Two million six hundred and ninety-three thousand nine hundred and twenty-seven pounds to the service of the year One thousand nine hundred and thirty-eight and One thousand nine hundred and thirty-nine.
Doncaster Road Tramway Construction Act 1938	No. 4546	6 September 1938
An Act to authorize the Construction by the Melbourne and Metropolitan Tramways Board of an Electric Tramway in Doncaster Road, Camberwell.
Snowy River Works Act 1938	No. 4548	6 September 1938
An Act to empower the State Rivers and Water Supply Commission to carry out certain Works, and for other purposes.
Echuca (High-street) Flood Protection District Abolition Act 1938	No. 4552	19 September 1938
An Act to abolish the Echuca (High-street) Flood Protection District and to transfer to the Mayor Councillors and Burgesses of the Borough of Echuca the Flood Protection Works constructed for the Service of the said District, and for other purposes.
Outer Circle Railway (Partial Dismantling) Act 1938 (repealed)	No. 4558	26 September 1938
An Act to provide for the Dismantling of Certain Sections of the Outer Circle Railway and for other purposes. (Repealed by Transport Act 1983 (No. 9921))
Unemployment Relief Loan and Application Act 1938 (repealed)	No. 4564	11 October 1938
An Act to amend Section Three of the Unemployment Relief Loan and Application Act 1932. (Note: Unemployment Relief Loan and Application Act 1932 (No. 4097)) (Repealed by Treasury Legislation (Repeal) Act 2005 (No. 73 of 2005))
Miners' Phthisis (Treasury Allowances) Act 1938 (repealed)	No. 4567	11 October 1938
An Act Relating to the Payment of Allowances to certain Persons suffering from Miners' Phthisis. (Repealed by Treasury Legislation (Repeal) Act 2005 (No. 73 of 2005))
Melbourne and Geelong Corporations Act 1938	No. 4574	17 October 1938
An Act to amend the Law relating to the City of Melbourne and the City of Geelong.
	No. 4576	31 October 1938
An Act to apply out of the Consolidated Revenue the sum of Two million five hundred and fifty-one thousand seven hundred and seventy-one pounds to the service of the year One thousand nine hundred and thirty-eight and One thousand nine hundred and thirty-nine.
Apprenticeship Act 1938	No. 4577	31 October 1938
An Act to amend Section Twenty-six of the Apprenticeship Act 1928. (Note: Apprenticeship Act 1928 (19 Geo. V. No. 3636))
Old Colonists' Association Act 1938	No. 4579	31 October 1938
An Act relating to the Funds of the Old Colonists' Association of Victoria.
Electoral (Secrecy of the Ballot) Act 1938	No. 4584	14 November 1938
An Act to ensure greater Secrecy of the Ballot at Parliamentary Elections.
Administration and Probate Duties Act 1938	No. 4586	21 November 1938
An Act to continue the operation of Part III. of the Finance Act 1930. (Note: Finance Act 1930 (No. 3889))
Church of England (Port Fairy) Land Act 1938	No. 4590	21 November 1938
An Act to make provision with respect to the Trusts upon which Certain Land at Port Fairy is held by The Ballarat Diocesan Trustees and with respect to the Sale or other Disposition of such Land and the Application of the Proceeds thereof, and for other purposes.
Black Rock to Beaumaris Electric Street Railway (Dismantling) Act 1938	No. 4591	21 November 1938
An Act to provide for the Dismantling of the Black Rock to Beaumaris Electric Street Railway and for other purposes.
Dried Fruits Act 1938	No. 4594	28 November 1938
An Act to consolidate and amend the Law relating to Dried Fruits and Dried Fruits Packing Houses and for other purposes.
Closer Settlement Act 1938	No. 4597	5 December 1981
An Act relating to Closer Settlement.
Ballaarat Free Library (Borrowing) Act 1938 (repealed)	No. 4600	5 December 1938
An Act to enable the Trustees of the Ballaarat Free Library and Reading Rooms to raise Money by way of Mortgage to pay off existing Liabilities and to effect certain Improvements to the said Library and Reading Rooms, and for other purposes. (Repealed by Legislation Reform (Repeals No. 1) Act 2008 (No. 10 of 2008))
Agricultural Education Act 1938	No. 4601	5 December 1938
An Act to amend the Agricultural Education Acts.
Tourists' Resorts Development Act 1938	No. 4609	19 December 1938
An Act relating to the Financing of the Construction Establishment Development and Maintenance of Tourist Resort Areas, Tourists' Resorts, Tourists' Roads and other Tourist Facilities and for other purposes.
Game (Koala Protection) Act 1938	No. 4615	19 December 1938
An Act to afford greater Protection to Koalas.
Western Metropolitan Market Act 1938 (repealed)	No. 4623	22 December 1938
An Act to provide for the Establishment Control Management and Carrying on of a Market for the Sale of Pigs and Calves in the Shire of Braybrook and for purposes incidental thereto. (Repealed by Statute Law Repeals Act 2007 (No. 21 of 2007))
Warrnambool (Albert Park) Land Act 1938	No. 4627	22 December 1938
An Act to revoke the Reservation of certain Land in the City of Warrnambool permanently reserved as a Site for a Public Park and to provide for the Reservation of Portions of the said Land as Sites for a Mental Hospital, for a Stone Reserve, and for Public Recreation respectively.
Carlton Land Act 1938 (repealed)	No. 4628	22 December 1938
An Act to revoke the Permanent Reservation and Crown Grant of certain Land at Carlton in the City of Melbourne permanently reserved as a Site for Oddfellows' Almshouses, to provide for the Sale thereof to the Mayor Aldermen Councillors and Citizens of the City of Melbourne and for the Application of the Proceeds of such Sale to the Purchase of other Land to be surrendered to His Majesty and reserved as a Site for a Convalescent Home for certain purposes and to the Building Fitting and Furnishing of such Home, and for other purposes. (Repealed by Statute Law Revision Act 1984 (No. 10087))
	No. 4630	22 December 1938
An Act to apply a sum out of the Consolidated Revenue to the service of the year ending on the thirtieth day of June One thousand nine hundred and thirty-nine and to appropriate the Supplies granted in this Session of Parliament.
Carriages Act 1938	No.	
Cattle Breeding Act 1938	No.	
Closer Settlement (Temporary Provisions) Act 1938	No.	
Companies Act 1938	No.	
Country Roads (Traffic Regulation) Act 1938	No.	
Country Roads Board Fund Act 1938	No.	
Explosives Act 1938	No.	
Factories and Shops Act 1938	No.	
Fair Rents Act 1938	No.	
Farmers Advances (Financial) Act 1938	No.	
Farmers Debts Adjustment (Apportionment) Act 1938	No.	
Financial Emergency (Grants and Funds) Act 1938	No.	
Financial Emergency (Mortgages) Continuation Act 1938	No.	
Freezing Works (Overdraft Guarantee) Act 1938	No.	
Friendly Societies Act 1938	No.	
Gold Buyers Act 1938	No.	
Greta Lands Exchange Act 1938	No.	
Hairdressers Registration Act 1938	No.	
Hepburn Springs Land Act 1938	No.	
Income Tax (Rates) Act 1938	No.	
Industrial Life Assurance Act 1938	No.	
Investment Companies Act 1938	No.	
Justices Act 1938	No.	
Land Tax Act 1938	No.	
Landlord and Tenant (Rent Reduction) Amendment Act 1938	No.	
Legislative Council Electors Act 1938	No.	
Licensing Fund Act 1938	No.	
Local Government (Rates) Act 1938	No.	
Local Government (Septic Tanks) Act 1938	No.	
Local Government (Temporary Reduction of Interest) Act 1938	No.	
Local Government Act 1938	No.	
Maintenance Act 1938	No.	
Marriage (Celebration) Act 1938	No.	
Marriage Act 1938	No.	
Medical Act 1938	No.	
Melbourne (Hopetoun Ward) Streets Act 1938	No.	
Melbourne and Metropolitan Board of Works (Rate) Act 1938	No.	
Melbourne and Metropolitan Tramways Act 1938	No.	
Melbourne Municipal Lands Exchange Act 1938	No.	
Milk Supply Committee Act 1938	No.	
Money Lenders Act 1938	No.	
Moorpanyal Land Act 1938	No.	
Morwell Land Act 1938	No.	
Police Offences (Obscene Publications) Act 1938	No.	
Police Regulation Act 1938	No.	
Public Works Committee Act 1938	No.	
Public Works Loan Application Act 1938	No.	
Railway Loan Application Act 1938	No.	
Registration of Births Deaths and Marriages Act 1938	No.	
Revocation of Crown Reservations Act 1938	No.	
Sewerage Districts (Temporary Reduction of Interest) Act 1938	No.	
Sewerage Districts Act 1938	No.	
Slum Reclamation and Housing (Financial) Act 1938	No.	
Slum Reclamation and Housing Act 1938	No.	
Stamps (Increases Duty Continuance) Act 1938	No.	
Stamps Act 1938	No.	
State Accident Insurance Fund Act 1938	No.	
State Forests Loan Application Act 1938	No.	
Superannuation (Retirement) Act 1938	No.	
Superannuation Act 1938	No.	
Unemployment Relief Tax (Rates) Act 1938	No.	
Warehousemen's Liens Act 1938	No.	
Water Supply Loans Application Act 1938	No.	
Wheat Products Prices Act 1938	No.	
Workers' Compensation (Amendment) Act 1938	No.	
Workers' Compensation Act 1938	No.	

== Sources ==
- "1938 Victorian Historical Acts". AustLII.
