= Murders Abroad Act 1817 =

Act of the Parliament of the United Kingdom

Murders Abroad Act 1817 (Note: The citation of this act by this short title was authorised by section 1 of, and the first schedule to, the Short Titles Act 1896. Due to the repeal of those provisions it is now authorised by section 19(2) of the Interpretation Act 1978.)
- Act of Parliament
- Parliament of the United Kingdom
- Long title: An Act for the more effectual Punishment of Murders and Manslaughters committed in Places not within His Majesty's Dominions.
- Citation: 57 Geo. 3. c. 53
- Territorial extent: United Kingdom; Bay of Honduras; New Zealand; (Note: Section 1.)

Dates
- Royal assent: 27 June 1817
- Commencement: 27 June 1817
- Repealed: England and Wales: 1 January 1968; Northern Ireland: 29 August 1967; Scotland: 21 May 1981
Other legislation
Amended by	Statute Law Revision Act 1873; Statute Law Revision (No. 2) Act 1890
Repealed by	England and Wales: Criminal Law Act 1967; Northern Ireland: Criminal Law Act (Northern Ireland) 1967; Scotland: Statute Law (Repeals) Act 1981

Status: Repealed

Text of statute as originally enacted

The Murders Abroad Act 1817 (57 Geo. 3. c. 53) was an act of the Parliament of the United Kingdom. It made it easier for a court to punish "murders or manslaughters committed in places not within His Majesty's dominions", and it received royal assent on 27 June 1817. The act specifically mentioned the Bay of Honduras, New Zealand, and Otaheite (an old name for Tahiti).

== Provisions ==
The original (full) title was: "An Act for the more effectual Punishment of Murders and Manslaughters committed in Places not within His Majesty's Dominions." This was shortened to "The Murders Abroad Act, 1817" by the Short Titles Act 1896. The legislation was passed by Parliament in 1817, and reads in part as such:

All murders and manslaughters committed or that shall be committed on land ... in the islands of New Zealand and Otaheite or within any other islands, countries or places not within his Majesty's dominions, nor subject to any European state or power, nor within the territory of the United States of America, by the master or crew of any British ship or vessel ... or by any person sailing therein or belonging thereto, or that shall have sailed in or belonged to and have quitted any British ship or vessel to live in any of the said islands countries or places ... may be tried, adjudged and punished ... in the same manner as if such offence or offences had been committed on the high seas.

The legislation is notable as it contains the first mention of New Zealand in a British statute. It also clarified that New Zealand was not a British colony, despite Captain James Cook having claimed the country on behalf of King George III. The act thus gave Lachlan Macquarie, the Governor of New South Wales, an increased legal authority over New Zealand and offences could be tried in an admiralty court just as if they had been committed at sea.

The jurisdiction of both the Supreme Court of New South Wales and the Supreme Court of Tasmania over New Zealand was initiated in the New South Wales Act 1823 (4 Geo. 4. c. 96), and lesser offences were included at that time. The Australian Courts Act 1828 (9 Geo. 4. c. 83) repeated the 1823 wording, but added that the punishment of the offence was to be the same as if the crime had been committed in England.

== Subsequent developments ==
Sections 2 and 3 of the act was repealed by section 1 of, and the schedule to, the Statute Law Revision Act 1873 (36 & 37 Vict. c. 91), which came into force on 5 August 1873.

The preamble to the act was repealed by section 1 of, and the first schedule to, the Statute Law Revision (No. 2) Act 1890 (53 & 54 Vict. c. 51), which came into force on 18 August 1890.

The act ceased to have any effect in New Zealand after the Crimes Act 1961, which came into force on 1 January 1962.

The whole act was repealed for England and Wales by section 10(2) of, and part I of schedule 3 to, the Criminal Law Act 1967, which came into force on 1 January 1968.

The whole act was repealed for Northern Ireland by the Criminal Law Act (Northern Ireland) 1967, which came into force on 29 August 1967.

The whole act was repealed for Scotland by section 1(1) of, and part I of schedule 1 to, the Statute Law (Repeals) Act 1981, which came into force on 21 May 1981.
