= List of acts of the Parliament of Victoria from 1891 =

This is a list of acts of the Parliament of Victoria, Australia for the year 1891.

== 1891 ==
Short title, or popular name	Citation	Royal assent
Long title
Marriage Act 1890 (No. 2) (Note: Although passed in the year 1890, and given a short title ending '...Act 1890', the need to obtain approval for this act from the United Kingdom meant it was not proclaimed until the year 1891.)	54 Vict. No. 1204	23 May 1891 (Note: This act was reserved for approval by Her Majesty.)
An Act to amend the Law relating to Marriage.
	55 Vict. No. 1205	9 July 1891
An Act to apply out of the Consolidated Revenue the sum of One hundred and ninety-four thousand nine hundred and eighty-six pounds to the service of the year One thousand eight hundred and ninety and ninety-one.
	55 Vict. No. 1206	29 July 1891
An Act to apply out of the Consolidated Revenue the sum of One million eight hundred and sixty-two thousand nine hundred and fourteen pounds to the service of the year One thousand eight hundred and ninety-one and ninety-two.
Fire Brigades Act 1891 (repealed)	55 Vict. No. 1207	24 August 1891
An Act to amend the Fire Brigades Act 1890. (Note: Fire Brigades Act 1890 (54 Vict. No. 1200)) (Repealed by Fire Brigades Act 1915 (6 Geo. V. No. 2653))
Supreme Court Act 1891 (repealed)	55 Vict. No. 1208	1 October 1891
An Act to amend the Supreme Court Act 1890. (Note: Supreme Court Act 1890 (54 Vict. No. 1142)) (Repealed by Supreme Court Act 1915 (6 Geo. V. No. 2733))
St. James' Church Land Trusts Act 1891	55 Vict. No. 1209	12 October 1891
An Act to alter Trusts and Limitations in respect of portion of the lands in the City of Melbourne generally known as St. James' Church Lands and for other purposes.
	55 Vict. No. 1210	12 October 1891
An Act to apply out of the Consolidated Revenue the sum of One million thirteen thousand two hundred and thirty-two pounds to the service of the year One thousand eight hundred and ninety-one and ninety-two.
Portland Town Hall Act 1891 or the Portland Shire Hall Act 1891 (repealed)	55 Vict. No. 1211	12 October 1891
An Act to enable the Mayor Councillors and Burgesses of the Borough of Portland to sell and convey certain lands at Portland and to apply the proceeds of such sale towards the cost of erecting a Town Hall and Municipal Offices elsewhere within the said borough. (Repealed by Statute Law Revision Act 1984 (No. 10087))
Libraries Act 1891 (repealed)	55 Vict. No. 1212	19 October 1891
An Act to amend the Libraries Act 1890. (Note: Libraries Act 1890 (54 Vict. No. 1110)) (Repealed by Libraries Act 1915 (6 Geo. V. No. 2682))
Land Sales by Auction Fund Act 1891	55 Vict. No. 1213	2 November 1891
An Act to establish a Land Sales by Auction Fund.
Scots' Church Properties Act 1891	55 Vict. No. 1214	2 November 1891
An Act to convert the existing Trusts relating to the Scots' Church Properties into one General Trust.
Mines Act 1891	55 Vict. No. 1215	2 November 1891
An Act to amend the Mines Act 1890. (Note: Mines Act 1890 (54 Vict. No. 1120))
Legal Profession Practice Act 1891 (repealed)	55 Vict. No. 1216	23 November 1891
An Act to regulate the Practice of the Legal Profession. (Repealed by Legal Profession Practice Act 1915 (6 Geo. V. No. 2681))
Victorian Stock Act 1891	55 Vict. No. 1217	23 November 1891
An Act to authorize the raising of Money for Railways and Irrigation Works.
	55 Vict. No. 1218	7 December 1891
An Act to amend the Tramways Act 1890 (Note: Tramways Act 1890 (54 Vict. No. 1148)) and to extend the provisions thereof to the Corporation of the City of Melbourne and the Councils of the Municipalities of Prahran and Saint Kilda within certain limits.
Employers and Employés Act 1891 or the Employers and Employees Act 1891 (repealed)	55 Vict. No. 1219	7 December 1891
An Act to amend the Employers and Employés Act 1890 (Note: Employers and Employés Act 1890 (54 Vict. No. 1087)) and for other purposes. (Repealed by Employers and Employés Act 1915 (6 Geo. V. No. 2646))
Voluntary Liquidation Act 1891	55 Vict. No. 1220	7 December 1891
An Act to amend the Companies Act 1890. (Note: Companies Act 1890 (54 Vict. No. 1074))
Melbourne and Williamstown Tramway Act 1891	55 Vict. No. 1221	14 December 1891
An Act to authorize The Austral-Anglo Tramway and General Agency Company Limited to construct Tramways in the City of South Melbourne the Borough of Port Melbourne and Town of Williamstown and for other purposes.
Partnership Act 1891	55 Vict. No. 1222	14 December 1891
An Act to declare and amend the Law of Partnership.
Bills of Sale Amending Act 1891 (repealed)	55 Vict. No. 1223	14 December 1891
An Act to amend the Law relating to Bills of Sale. (Repealed by Instruments Act 1915 (6 Geo. V. No. 2672))
Municipal Overdrafts (Indemnity) Act 1891	55 Vict. No. 1224	14 December 1891
An Act to indemnify the Councillors of various Municipalities for Borrowing Moneys by Overdrafts on Bankers for the purposes of their Municipalities contrary to the provisions of the Local Government Act 1890 (Note: Local Government Act 1890 (54 Vict. No. 1112)) and for other purposes.
Licensing Arbitration Act 1891 (repealed)	55 Vict. No. 1225	22 December 1891
An Act relating to Arbitrations under the Licensing Act 1890 (Note: Licensing Act 1890 (54 Vict. No. 1111)) and for other purposes. (Repealed by Licensing Act 1915 (6 Geo. V. No. 2683))
Councils of Conciliation Act 1891	55 Vict. No. 1226	22 December 1891
An Act to provide for the establishment of Councils of Conciliation.
Bendigo Art Gallery Site Act 1891	55 Vict. No. 1227	22 December 1891
An Act to authorize the Council of Defence to transfer certain Land to the Trustees of the Bendigo Art Gallery.
Trusts Act 1891	55 Vict. No. 1228	22 December 1891
An Act to amend the Trusts Act 1890 (Note: Trusts Act 1890 (54 Vict. No. 1150)) and for other purposes.
	55 Vict. No. 1229	22 December 1891
An Act to amend the Legal Profession Practice Act 1891. (Note: Legal Profession Practice Act 1891 (55 Vict. No. 1216)) (Repealed by Legal Profession Practice Act 1915 (6 Geo. V. No. 2681))
Railways Standing Committee Act 1891 (repealed)	55 Vict. No. 1230	22 December 1891
An Act to provide for the remuneration of the Parliamentary Standing Committee on Railways. (Repealed by Railways Standing Committee Act 1915 (6 Geo. V. No. 2717))
Crimes Act 1891 (repealed)	55 Vict. No. 1231	23 December 1891
An Act to amend the Crimes Act 1890 (Note: Crimes Act 1890 (54 Vict. No. 1079)) and for other purposes. (Repealed by Crimes Act 1915 (6 Geo. V. No. 2637))
Friendly Societies Act 1891 (repealed)	55 Vict. No. 1232	23 December 1891
An Act to amend the Friendly Societies Act 1890. (Note: Friendly Societies Act 1890 (54 Vict. No. 1094)) (Repealed by Friendly Societies Act 1915 (6 Geo. V. No. 2656))
Treasury Bonds Act 1891	55 Vict. No. 1233	23 December 1891
An Act to authorize the issue of Treasury Bonds.
Railway Loan Application Act 1891	55 Vict. No. 1234	23 December 1891
An Act to apply out of "The Victorian Stock Act 1891 Account" or temporarily out of "The Public Account" certain sums of money for Railway Works and other purposes.
Agricultural and other Grants Act 1891	55 Vict. No. 1235	23 December 1891
An Act to alter the amounts of certain Agricultural and other Grants.
Statute Law Revision Act 1891	55 Vict. No. 1236	23 December 1891
An Act to correct certain errors in Acts.
St. Arnaud School of Mines Site Act 1891	55 Vict. No. 1237	23 December 1891
An Act to authorize a portion of the Market Reserve at St. Arnaud being reserved as a site for a School of Mines.
Administration and Probate Act 1891 (repealed)	55 Vict. No. 1238	23 December 1891
An Act to amend the Administration and Probate Act 1890. (Note: Administration and Probate Act 1890 (54 Vict. No. 1060)) (Repealed by Administration and Probate Act 1915 (6 Geo. V. No. 2611))
Kyneton Market Reserve Act 1891	55 Vict. No. 1239	23 December 1891
An Act to authorize the Sale of part of the Kyneton Market Reserve and for other purposes.
Coal Mines Railway Construction Act 1891	55 Vict. No. 1240	23 December 1891
An Act to authorize the construction of Lines of . Railway from Korumburra on the Great Southern line to Coal Creek, Strezlecki, and Jumbunna Coal Mines respectively.
Police Offences Act 1891 (repealed)	55 Vict. No. 1241	29 December 1891
An Act to amend the Police Offences Act 1890. (Note: Police Offences Act 1890 (54 Vict. No. 1126)) (Repealed by Police Offences Act 1912 (3 Geo. V. No. 2422))
Purification of Rolls Act 1891	55 Vict. No. 1242	29 December 1891
An Act to provide for the Purification of the Electoral Rolls for the Legislative Assembly and for other purposes.
Local Government Act 1891	55 Vict. No. 1243	29 December 1891
An Act to amend the Local Government Act 1890.
Thistle Act 1891	55 Vict. No. 1244	29 December 1891
An Act to amend the Law relating to Thistles.
Water Supply Loans Application Act 1891	55 Vict. No. 1245	29 December 1891
An Act to sanction the issue and application of certain sums of money as Loans for Irrigation Works and Water Supply in the Country Districts and for other purposes.
Land Act 1891 (repealed)	55 Vict. No. 1246	29 December 1891
An Act to amend the Land Act 1890. (Note: Land Act 1890 (54 Vict. No. 1106)) (Repealed by Land Act 1901 (1 Edw. VII. No. 1749))
	55 Vict. No. 1247	29 December 1891
An Act to apply a sum out of the Consolidated Revenue to the service of the year ending on the thirtieth day of June One thousand eight hundred and ninety-two and to appropriate the Supplies granted in this Session of Parliament.
Defences and Discipline Act 1891	55 Vict. No. 1248	29 December 1891
An Act to amend the Defences and Discipline Act 1890. (Note: Defences and Discipline Act 1890 (54 Vict. No. 1083))
	55 Vict. No. 1249	29 December 1891
An Act for the Resumption by the Crown of certain Land in the parishes of Burrumbeet and Brewster.
Railways Act 1891 (repealed)	55 Vict. No. 1250	29 December 1891
An Act to amend the Railways Act 1890 (Note: Railways Act 1890 (54 Vict. No. 1135)) and for other purposes. (Repealed by Railway Lands Acquisition Act 1915 (6 Geo. V. No. 2715))
Mines Act 1891 (No. 2)	55 Vict. No. 1251	29 December 1891
An Act to amend the Mines Act 1890.
Waterworks Construction Encouragement Act 1891	55 Vict. No. 1252	29 December 1891
An Act to further amend The Waterworks Construction Encouragement Act 1886. (Note: Waterworks Construction Encouragement Act 1886 (50 Vict. No. 910))

== Sources ==
- "1891 Victorian Historical Acts". AustLII.
