= List of acts of the Parliament of Victoria from 1903 =

This is a list of acts of the Parliament of Victoria, Australia for the year 1903.

== 1903 ==
Short title, or popular name	Citation	Royal assent
Long title
Ballaarat Court House Land Act 1902 (Note: Although given a short title ending '...Act 1902', this act was passed in the year 1903.) (repealed)	3 Edw. VII. No. 1814	5 February 1903
An Act relating to certain Land granted as a Site for a Market Place in the City of Ballaarat. (Repealed by Ballaarat Lands Act 1939 (No. 4716))
Administration and Probate Act 1903 (repealed)	3 Edw. VII. No. 1815	5 February 1903
An Act to amend the Administration and Probate Acts. (Repealed by Administration and Probate Act 1915 (6 Geo. V. No. 2611))
Seed Advances Act 1903	3 Edw. VII. No. 1816	6 February 1903
An Act to enable Seed and Fodder to be advanced on certain terms to Cultivators of Land.
Acting Victorian Railways Commissioner Act 1903	3 Edw. VII. No. 1817	20 February 1903
An Act to provide for the further Appointment of an Acting Victorian Railways Commissioner.
	3 Edw. VII. No. 1818	27 February 1903
An Act to apply out of the Consolidated Revenue the sum of Three hundred and twenty-three thousand and seventy-three pounds to the service of the year One thousand nine hundred and two and One thousand nine hundred and three.
Income Tax Act 1903 (repealed)	3 Edw. VII. No. 1819	5 March 1903
An Act to declare the Rates of Income Tax for the year ending on the thirty-first day of December One thousand nine hundred and three and to continue and amend the Income Tax Acts. (Repealed by Income Tax Act 1915 (6 Geo. V. No. 2668))
Railways Act 1903 (repealed)	3 Edw. VII. No. 1820	6 April 1903
An Act relating to the Railway Accident Fund and to the Railways Stores Suspense Account. (Repealed by Railway Lands Acquisition Act 1915 (6 Geo. V. No. 2715))
Church of England Act 1903	3 Edw. VII. No. 1821	6 April 1903
An Act relating to the Church of England in Victoria.
Mallee Land Account Act 1903	3 Edw. VII. No. 1822	6 April 1903
An Act providing for the Transfer to the Consolidated Revenue of the Mallee Land Account.
Income Tax Receipts Act 1903 (repealed)	3 Edw. VII. No. 1823	6 April 1903
An Act relating to receipts of Income Tax during July and August One thousand nine hundred and three. (Repealed by Income Tax Act 1915 (6 Geo. V. No. 2668))
Patents Act 1903	3 Edw. VII. No. 1824	6 April 1903
An Act to amend the law concerning Letters Patent for Inventions.
Victorian Railways Commissioners Act 1903 (repealed)	3 Edw. VII. No. 1825	6 April 1903
An Act to provide for the Appointment of three Victorian Railways Commissioners instead of one Commissioner. (Repealed by Railway Lands Acquisition Act 1915 (6 Geo. V. No. 2715))
University Act 1903 (repealed)	3 Edw. VII. No. 1826	6 April 1903
An Act to amend the University Act 1890. (Note: University Act 1890 (54 Vict. No. 1151)) (Repealed by University Act 1915 (6 Geo. V. No. 2742))
Probate Charges Act 1903 (repealed)	3 Edw. VII. No. 1827	6 April 1903
An Act relating to Legal Charges for obtaining Probate or Letters of Administration. (Repealed by Administration and Probate Act 1915 (6 Geo. V. No. 2611))
Coroners Act 1903 (repealed)	3 Edw. VII. No. 1828	6 April 1903
An Act to further amend the Coroners Act 1890. (Note: Coroners Act 1890 (54 Vict. No. 1077)) (Repealed by Coroners Act 1911 (2 Geo. V. No. 2343))
Unlawful Assemblies and Processions Act 1903 (repealed)	3 Edw. VII. No. 1829	6 April 1903
An Act to amend Part I. of the Unlawful Assemblies and Processions Act 1890. (Note: Unlawful Assemblies and Processions Act 1890 (54 Vict. No. 1152)) (Repealed by Unlawful Assemblies and Processions Act 1915 (6 Geo. V. No. 2743))
Yea Race-course and Public Recreation Reserve Land Act 1903	3 Edw. VII. No. 1830	6 April 1903
An Act to provide for the Sale of the Yea Race-course and Public Recreation Reserve and for the Purchase of other Land in lieu thereof.
Land Act 1903 (repealed)	3 Edw. VII. No. 1831	6 April 1903
An Act relating to the Selection and Purchase of Crown Land. (Repealed by Land Act 1915 (6 Geo. V. No. 2676))
Water Act 1903	3 Edw. VII. No. 1832	6 April 1903
An Act to amend the Water Acts so far as relates to the Condah Swamp Lands.
Colac Market Land Act 1903	3 Edw. VII. No. 1833	6 April 1903
An Act to revoke the permanent reservation of certain Crown Land in the County of Polwarth, Town of Colac.
Colac Library Act 1903	3 Edw. VII. No. 1834	6 April 1903
An Act to authorize the Sale of certain Land reserved as a Site for a Public Library and Heading Room at Colac and for other purposes.
Registration of Births Deaths and Marriages Act 1903	3 Edw. VII. No. 1835	6 April 1903
An Act to Legitimize Children by Registration under the Registration of Births Deaths and Marriages Acts.
Insolvency Act 1903 (repealed)	3 Edw. VII. No. 1836	6 April 1903
An Act to amend the Law relating to Insolvency. (Repealed by Insolvency Act 1915 (6 Geo. V. No. 2671))
Legal Profession Practice Act 1903 (repealed)	3 Edw. VII. No. 1837	6 April 1903
An Act to remove some Anomalies in the Law relating to Women. (Repealed by Legal Profession Practice Act 1915 (6 Geo. V. No. 2681))
Benalla Fire Brigade Station Land Act 1903 (repealed)	3 Edw. VII. No. 1838	6 April 1903
An Act to revoke the Proclamation as a Public Road of certain Land in the Town of Benalla and to vest such Land in the Country Fire Brigades Board. (Repealed by Statute Law Revision Act 1984 (No. 10087))
St. Arnaud Land Act 1903	3 Edw. VII. No. 1839	6 April 1903
An. Act to revoke the permanent reservation and grant of certain land at St. Arnaud.
Dairying Companies Act 1903	3 Edw. VII. No. 1840	6 April 1903
An Act to further amend the Dairying Companies Act 1900. (Note: Dairying Companies Act 1900 (63 Vict. No. 1649))
Melbourne Tramways Trust Act 1903	3 Edw. VII. No. 1841	6 April 1903
An Act to provide for the Restriction of Transfer of Debentures held by the Melbourne Tramways Trust.
Mildura Irrigation Trusts Act 1903	3 Edw. VII. No. 1842	6 April 1903
An Act to further amend the Mildura Irrigation Trusts Act 1895 (Note: Mildura Irrigation Trusts Act 1895 (59 Vict. No. 1409)) and for other purposes
Necropolis, Spring Vale, Act 1903 (repealed)	3 Edw. VII. No. 1843	6 April 1903
An Act relating to The Necropolis, Spring Vale. (Repealed by Cemeteries Act 1915 (6 Geo. V. No. 2626))
	3 Edw. VII. No. 1844	7 April 1903
An Act to apply a sum out of the Consolidated Revenue to the service of the year ending on the thirtieth day of June One thousand nine hundred and three and to appropriate the Supplies granted in this and the last preceding Session of Parliament.
	3 Edw. VII. No. 1845	22 May 1903
An Act to apply out of the Consolidated Revenue the sum of Nine hundred and three thousand seven hundred and eleven pounds to the service of the year One thousand nine hundred and three and One thousand nine hundred and four.
Railways Employés Strike Act 1903 or the Railways Employees Strike Act 1903	3 Edw. VII. No. 1846	22 May 1903
An Act relating to the Railways Employés Strike.
Treasury Bonds Act 1903	3 Edw. VII. No. 1847	22 May 1903
An Act to authorize the Issue of Treasury Bonds.
Melbourne and Metropolitan Board of Works Payment Act 1903 (repealed)	3 Edw. VII. No. 1848	22 May 1903
An Act relating to certain Moneys payable by the Melbourne and Metropolitan Board of Works to the Treasurer of Victoria during the financial Year One thousand nine hundred and three and four. (Repealed by Melbourne and Metropolitan Board of Works Act 1915 (6 Geo. V. No. 2696))
Ministers and Special and Other Appropriations Retrenchment Act 1903	3 Edw. VII. No. 1849	25 August 1903 (Note: This act was reserved for approval by His Majesty.)
An Act to provide for the Reduction until the thirtieth day of June One thousand nine hundred and three of the Salaries or Pay of Responsible Ministers of the Crown and certain Officers under The Constitution Act (Note: Constitution Act 1855 (19 Vict.)) or Part IX. of The Constitution Act Amendment Act 1890 (Note: Constitution Act Amendment Act 1890 (54 Vict. No. 1075)) or whose Salaries or Pay are provided for by Special Appropriations.
	3 Edw. VII. No. 1850	30 September 1903
An Act to apply out of the Consolidated Revenue the sum of Three hundred and eighty-three thousand two hundred and twelve pounds to the service of the year One thousand nine hundred and three and One thousand nine hundred and four.
Dairying Companies Act 1903 (No. 2)	3 Edw. VII. No. 1851	13 October 1903
An Act to further amend the Dairying Companies Act 1900.
	3 Edw. VII. No. 1852	26 October 1903
An Act to apply out of the Consolidated Revenue the sum of Forty-three thousand nine hundred and ninety-two pounds to the service of the year One thousand nine hundred and two and One thousand nine hundred and three.
Agricultural Colleges Act 1903 (repealed)	3 Edw. VII. No. 1853	26 October 1903
An Act to confer certain powers upon the Council of Agricultural Education, the Trustees appointed under the Agricultural Colleges Act 1890, (Note: Agricultural Colleges Act 1890 (54 Vict. No. 1062)) and the Municipality of Castle Donnington. (Repealed by Agricultural Colleges Act 1915 (6 Geo. V. No. 2613))
Benalla Fire Brigade Station Act 1903	3 Edw. VII. No. 1854	26 October 1903
An Act to amend the Benalla Fire Brigade Station Land Act 1903. (Note: Benalla Fire Brigade Station Land Act 1903 (3 Edw. VII. No. 1838))
Joint Library Committee Act 1903 (repealed)	3 Edw. VII. No. 1855	26 October 1903
An Act relating to the Parliamentary Joint Library Committee. (Repealed by Constitution Act Amendment Act 1915 (6 Geo. V. No. 2632))
	3 Edw. VII. No. 1856	28 October 1903
An Act to apply out of the Consolidated Revenue the sum of Seven hundred and eleven thousand three hundred and forty-nine pounds to the service of the year One thousand nine hundred and three and One thousand nine hundred and four.
Factories and Shops Act 1903 (repealed)	3 Edw. VII. No. 1857	30 October 1903
An Act to continue and amend the Factories and Shops Act 1896 (Note: Factories and Shops Act 1896 (60 Vict. No. 1445)) and the Acts amending the same. (Repealed by Factories and Shops Act 1905 (5 Edw. VII. No. 1975))
Municipal Overdrafts (Indemnity) Act 1903	3 Edw. VII. No. 1858	12 November 1903
An Act to indemnify the Councillors of various Municipalities for Borrowing Moneys by Overdrafts on Bankers for the purposes of their Municipalities contrary to the provisions of the Local Government Act 1890 (Note: Local Government Act 1890 (54 Vict. No. 1112)) and for other purposes.
Royal Agricultural Show Day Act 1903 (repealed)	3 Edw. VII. No. 1859	12 November 1903
An Aet relating to the Royal Agricultural Show Day. (Repealed by Public Service Act 1915 (6 Geo. V. No. 2713))
Senate Elections (Times and Places) Act 1903 (repealed)	3 Edw. VII. No. 1860	23 November 1903
An Act relating to the election of Senators for Victoria to the Senate of the Commonwealth. (Repealed by Senate Elections (Times and Places) Act 1915 (6 Geo. V. No. 2723))
Railway Passengers' Actions Act 1903 (repealed)	3 Edw. VII. No. 1861	23 November 1903
An Act relating to Actions against the Commissioners of Railways as Carriers of Passengers. (Repealed by Railway Lands Acquisition Act 1915 (6 Geo. V. No. 2715))
Administration and Probate Duties Act 1903 (No. 2) (repealed)	3 Edw. VII. No. 1862	23 November 1903
An Act relating to Duties payable under the Administration and Probate Acts. (Repealed by Administration and Probate Act 1915 (6 Geo. V. No. 2611))
Income Tax Act 1903 (No. 2) (repealed)	3 Edw. VII. No. 1863	23 November 1903
An Act to declare the Rates of Income Tax for the Year ending on the thirty-first day of December One thousand nine hundred and four and to continue and amend the Income Tax Acts. (Repealed by Income Tax Act 1915 (6 Geo. V. No. 2668))
Constitution Act 1903 (repealed)	3 Edw. VII. No. 1864	26 November 1903
An Act to provide for the Reform of The Constitution of Victoria. (Repealed by Constitution Act Amendment Act 1915 (6 Geo. V. No. 2632))
Old-age Pensions Act 1903	3 Edw. VII. No. 1865	9 December 1903
An Act to amend the Old-age Pensions Act 1901. (Note: Old-age Pensions Act 1901 (1 Edw. VII. No. 1733))
Health Act 1903 (repealed)	3 Edw. VII. No. 1866	22 December 1903
An Act to further amend the Health Act 1890 (Note: Health Act 1890 (54 Vict. No. 1098)) and for other purposes. (Repealed by Health Act 1915 (6 Geo. V. No. 2665))
Kerang Lands Act 1903	3 Edw. VII. No. 1867	22 December 1903
An Act to provide for the Sale of certain Land granted as a Site for a Race-course in the Parish of Meran near Kerang.
Ballarat Agricultural and Pastoral Society's Land Act 1903	3 Edw. VII. No. 1868	22 December 1903
An Act to provide for the Resumption by the Crown of certain Land in the County of Ripon, Town of Learmonth, and for other purposes.
Surplus Revenue Act 1903	3 Edw. VII. No. 1869	22 December 1903
An Act relating to the Surplus Revenue of the Financial Year ended on the thirtieth day of June One thousand nine hundred and three.
Municipal Endowment Reduction Act 1903	3 Edw. VII. No. 1870	22 December 1903
An Act to reduce for One Year the Municipal Endowment.
Wombat Land Act 1903	3 Edw. VII. No. 1871	22 December 1903
An Act to revoke the Permanent Reservation of certain Land in the Parish of Wombat.
Electoral Rolls Act 1903 (repealed)	3 Edw. VII. No. 1872	22 December 1903
An Act relating to the preparation of Electoral Rolls for the Legislative Council and for the Legislative Assembly. (Repealed by Constitution Act Amendment Act 1915 (6 Geo. V. No. 2632))
Lunacy Act 1903 (repealed)	3 Edw. VII. No. 1873	22 December 1903
An Act to amend the Law relating to Lunacy. (Repealed by Lunacy Act 1915 (6 Geo. V. No. 2687))
Hepburn Springs Land Act 1903	3 Edw. VII. No. 1874	22 December 1903
An Act to provide for the Leasing of certain Lands for the purpose of working Mineral Springs at Hepburn.
Transfer of Land Act 1903 (repealed)	3 Edw. VII. No. 1875	24 December 1903
An Act to amend the Transfer of Land Act 1890. (Note: Transfer of Land Act 1890 (54 Vict. No. 1149)) (Repealed by Transfer of Land Act 1915 (6 Geo. V. No. 2740))
Cremation Act 1903 (repealed)	3 Edw. VII. No. 1876	24 December 1903
An Act to regulate Cremation and for other purposes. (Repealed by Cemeteries Act 1915 (6 Geo. V. No. 2626))
Committee of Public Accounts Act 1903 (repealed)	3 Edw. VII. No. 1877	24 December 1903
An Act relating to the Committee of Public Accounts. (Repealed by Constitution Act Amendment Act 1915 (6 Geo. V. No. 2632))
Savings Banks Act 1903	3 Edw. VII. No. 1878	24 December 1903
An Act to further amend the Savings Banks Acts.
Burrumbeet Park Railway Construction Act 1903	3 Edw. VII. No. 1879	24 December 1903
An Act to construct n Line of Railway from Burrumbeet Station to Burrumbeet Park Reserve, and for other purposes.
Yarrowee Channel Further Loan Act 1903	3 Edw. VII. No. 1880	24 December 1903
An Act to provide for a further grant and loan by the State for the Yarrowee Channel Works at Ballarat.
Water Supply Loans Application Act 1903	3 Edw. VII. No. 1881	24 December 1903
An Act to sanction the issue and application of certain Sums of Money available under Loan Acts for Water Supply in Country Districts and for other purposes.
Public Works Loan Application Act 1903	3 Edw. VII. No. 1882	24 December 1903
An Act to sanction the issue and application of certain Sums of Money available under Loan Acts for Public Works and other purposes.
Libraries Act 1903 (repealed)	3 Edw. VII. No. 1883	24 December 1903
An Act to further amend the Libraries Act 1890. (Note: Libraries Act 1890 (54 Vict. No. 1110)) (Repealed by Libraries Act 1915 (6 Geo. V. No. 2682))
Railway Loan Application Act 1903	3 Edw. VII. No. 1884	24 December 1903
An Act to sanction the Issue and Application of certain Sums of Money available under Loan Acts for Railways.
South Melbourne Loan Act 1903	3 Edw. VII. No. 1885	24 December 1903
An Act to authorize the City of South Melbourne to construct and provide certain Permanent Works and Undertakings in lieu of certain other Permanent Works and Undertakings.
Companies Act 1903 (repealed)	3 Edw. VII. No. 1886	24 December 1903
An Act to amend the Companies Acts and for other purposes. (Repealed by Companies Act 1915 (6 Geo. V. No. 2631))
Legal Practitioners Reciprocity Act 1903 (repealed)	3 Edw. VII. No. 1887	24 December 1903
An Act to provide for the Admission of Legal Practitioners from other States of the Commonwealth to practise in Victoria on Terms of Reciprocity and for other purposes relating to the Admission of Legal Practitioners. (Repealed by Legal Profession Practice Act 1915 (6 Geo. V. No. 2681))
Public Service Act Amendment Act 1903 (repealed)	3 Edw. VII. No. 1888	24 December 1903
An Act to amend Parts II. and III. of the Public Service Act 1890 (Note: Public Service Act 1890 (54 Vict. No. 1133)) as to the provisions therein relating to Life Insurance of Appointees. (Repealed by Public Service Act 1915 (6 Geo. V. No. 2713))
Fitzroy Loan Act 1903	3 Edw. VII. No. 1889	24 December 1903
An Act to enable the Fitzroy City Council to carry out certain Works with the Surplus Moneys in hand from the No. 6 Loan.
Ballarat Old Colonists' Association Act 1903	3 Edw. VII. No. 1890	24 December 1903
An Act relating to the Old Colonists' Association of Ballarat.
Election Expenses Limitation Act 1903 (repealed)	3 Edw. VII. No. 1891	24 December 1903
An Act to Limit Parliamentary Election Expenses. (Repealed by Constitution Act Amendment Act 1915 (6 Geo. V. No. 2632))
	3 Edw. VII. No. 1892	24 December 1903
An Act to apply a sum out of the Consolidated Revenue to the service of the year ending on the thirtieth day of June One thousand nine hundred and four and to appropriate the Supplies granted in this and the last preceding Session of Parliament.
Local Government Act 1903 (repealed)	3 Edw. VII. No. 1893	24 December 1903
An Act to consolidate and amend the Laws relating to Local Government. (Repealed by Local Government Act 1915 (6 Geo. V. No. 2686))
Unused Roads and Water Frontages Act 1903 (repealed)	3 Edw. VII. No. 1894	24 December 1903
An Act to derive revenue from Unused Public Roads and Water Frontages. (Repealed by Local Government Act 1915 (6 Geo. V. No. 2686))
Electoral Districts Boundaries Act 1903 (repealed)	3 Edw. VII. No. 1895	24 December 1903
An Act for determining the Boundaries and Divisions of the Legislative Assembly Electoral Districts and for other purposes. (Repealed by Constitution Act Amendment Act 1915 (6 Geo. V. No. 2632))
Electoral Provinces Boundaries Act 1903 (repealed)	3 Edw. VII. No. 1896	24 December 1903
An Act for determining the Boundaries and Divisions of the Legislative Council Electoral Provinces and for other purposes. (Repealed by Constitution Act Amendment Act 1915 (6 Geo. V. No. 2632))

== Sources ==
- "1903 Victorian Historical Acts". AustLII.
