= List of acts of the Parliament of Victoria from 1949 =

This is a list of acts of the Parliament of Victoria, Australia for the year 1949.

== 1949 ==
Short title, or popular name	Citation	Royal assent
Long title
Horsham Land Act 1949 (repealed)	No. 5364	10 May 1949
An Act to provide for an Enlargement of the purposes of the Reservation of certain Land at Horsham now reserved as a Site for a Race-course and -other purposes of Public Recreation. (Repealed by Statute Law Revision Act 1984 (No. 10087))
River Murray Waters Act 1949 (repealed)	No. 5369	24 May 1949
An Act to ratify and approve an Agreement for the further Variation of the Agreement entered into between the Prime Minister of the Commonwealth and the Premiers of the States of New South Wales Victoria and South Australia respecting the River Murray and Lake Victoria and other Waters and to amend the River Murray Waters Acts, and for other purposes. (Repealed by Legislation Reform (Repeals No. 2) Act 2008 (No. 16 of 2008))
	No. 5371	31 May 1949
An Act to apply out of the Consolidated Revenue the sum of Six million and fifty-four thousand nine hundred and twenty-six pounds to the service of the year One thousand nine hundred and forty-nine and One thousand nine hundred and fifty.
Agricultural Education Act 1949	No. 5372	31 May 1949
An Act to consolidate and amend the Law relating to Agricultural Education.
	No. 5376	7 June 1949
An Act to apply out of the Consolidated Revenue the sum of Eight hundred and forty thousand pounds to the service of the year One thousand nine hundred and forty-eight and One thousand nine hundred and forty-nine.
Governor's Salary Act 1949	No. 5380	13 July 1949 (Note: This act was reserved for approval by His Majesty.)
An Act to amend Section Ten of The Constitution Act Amendment Act 1928. (Note: Constitution Act Amendment Act 1928 (19 Geo. V. No. 3660))
	No. 5381	16 August 1949
An Act to apply out of the Consolidated Revenue the sum of Six million five hundred and fortysix thousand two hundred and twenty-two pounds to the service of the year One thousand nine hundred and forty-nine and One thousand nine hundred and fifty.
Williamstown Lands Act 1949 (repealed)	No. 5392	11 October 1949
An Act to revoke the Permanent Reservations and Crown Grants of certain Lands at Williamstown, and for other purposes. (Repealed by Statute Law Revision Act 1984 (No. 10087))
	No. 5394	11 October 1949
An Act to apply out of the Consolidated Revenue the sum of One million one hundred and twenty-eight thousand seven hundred and eighty-five pounds to the service of the year One thousand nine hundred and forty-eight and One thousand nine hundred and forty-nine.
Lancefield and Kilmore Railway (Disposal of Land) Act 1949 (repealed)	No. 5399	11 October 1949
An Act to provide for the Sale and otherwise dealing with Land upon which the Lancefield and Kilmore Railway was constructed. (Repealed by Transport Act 1983 (No. 9921))
Administration and Probate Duties Act 1949	No. 5402	11 October 1949
An Act to continue the Operation of Part III. of the Finance Act 1930. (Note: Finance Act 1930 (No. 3889))
	No. 5409	4 November 1949
An Act to apply out of the Consolidated Revenue the sum of Twenty million one hundred and ninety-two thousand and fourteen pounds to the service of the year One thousand nine hundred and forty-nine and One thousand nine hundred and fifty.
Metropolitan Gas Company's Act 1949 (repealed)	No. 5428	28 November 1949
An Act to provide for the Increase of the Capital and the Subdivision of the Shares of The Metropolitan Gas Company and to re-enact Section Two hundred and forty-nine of and to amend consequentially The Metropolitan Gas Company's Act 1878. (Note: Metropolitan Gas Company's Act 1878 (41 Vict. No. 586)) (Repealed by Statute Law Revision Act 1995 (No. 11 of 1995))
	No. 5440	6 December 1949
An Act to apply a sum out of the Consolidated Revenue to the service of the year ending on the thirtieth day of June One thousand nine hundred and fifty and to appropriate the Supplies granted in this Session of Parliament.
Local Government Act 1949	No. 5443	6 December 1949
An Act to amend the Local Government Acts, and for other purposes.
Public Library National Gallery and Museums Act 1949 (repealed)	No. 5447	6 December 1949
An Act to make Provision with respect to the Museum of Applied Science of Victoria, and for other purposes. (Repealed by State Library National Gallery National Museum and Institute of Applied Science (Amendment) Act 1966 (No. 7379))
Barwon River Improvement (Amendment) Act 1949	No.	
Building Operations and Building Materials Control (Amendment) Act 1949	No.	
Business Investigations Act 1949	No.	
Castlemaine Land Act 1949	No.	
Co-operative Housing Societies Act 1949	No.	
Coal (Overseas Purchase) Amendment Act 1949	No.	
Coal Mines Workers Pensions (Amendment) Act 1949	No.	
Collingwood (Unimproved Rating Poll) Act 1949	No.	
Country Roads (Financial) Act 1949	No.	
Country Roads Board Fund (Amendment) Act 1949	No.	
Crimes Act 1949	No.	
Croydon Fruit Cool Stores Act 1949	No.	
Fire Brigades (Appeal Tribunal) Act 1949	No.	
Footwear Regulation (Amendment) Act 1949	No.	
Forestry Pulp and Paper Company's Afforestation Contracts Act 1949	No.	
Forests (Exchange of Lands) Extension Act 1949	No.	
Geelong Waterworks and Sewerage Act 1949	No.	
Grain Elevators (Financial) Act 1949	No.	
Greta Lands Exchange Act 1949	No.	
Health (Cattle) Act 1949	No.	
Health (Tuberculosis Arrangement) Act 1949	No.	
Imported Materials Loan and Application Act 1949	No.	
Judges Pensions Act 1949	No.	
Justices (Service of Process) Act 1949	No.	
Land (Grants and Leases) Act 1949	No.	
Land Tax Act 1949	No.	
Latrobe Valley Development Loan and Application Act 1949	No.	
Legal Profession Practice Act 1949	No.	
Licensing (Amendment) Act 1949	No.	
Liquid Fuel Act 1949	No.	
Local Authorities Superannuation (Amendment) Act 1949	No.	
Masseurs (Registration) Act 1949	No.	
Melbourne and Metropolitan Tramways (Chairman) Act 1949	No.	
Mental Institution Benefits Act 1949	No.	
Mildura Irrigation and Water Trusts (Financial) Act 1949	No.	
Milk Pasteurization Act 1949	No.	
Miners' Phthisis (Treasury Allowances) Amendment Act 1949	No.	
Mines (Amendment) Act 1949	No.	
Minister of Education Act 1949	No.	
Mothercraft Nurses Act 1949	No.	
Motor Car (Amendment) Act 1949	No.	
Motor Car (Registration) Act 1949	No.	
Municipal Endowment (Temporary Discontinuance) Act 1949	No.	
North-West Mallee Settlement Areas (Amendment) Act 1949	No.	
Police Offences (Amendment) Act 1949	No.	
Police Regulation (Amendment) Act 1949	No.	
Portland Harbor Trust Act 1949	No.	
Prices Regulation Act 1949	No.	
Public Account Advances (Amendment) Act 1949	No.	
Public Works Loan and Application Act 1949	No.	
Railway Loan Application Act 1949	No.	
Railways (Long Service) Act 1949	No.	
Revocation and Excision of Crown Reservations Act 1949	No.	
Royal Commission (Communist Party) Act 1949	No.	
Royal Commission (Communist Party) Amendment Act 1949	No.	
Rural Finance Corporation Act 1949	No.	
Shearers Accommodation Act 1949	No.	
Soil Conservation and Land Utilization Act 1949	No.	
Soldier Settlement (Amendment) Act 1949	No.	
Soldier Settlement Act 1949	No.	
Stamps (Increased Duty Continuance) Act 1949	No.	
State Development Act 1949	No.	
State Electricity Commission (Chairman) Act 1949	No.	
State Forests Loan and Application Act 1949	No.	
Superannuation (Amendment) Act 1949	No.	
Tourists' Resorts Development (Financial) Act 1949	No.	
Town and Country Planning (Metropolitan Area) Act 1949	No.	
Treasury Bonds Act 1949	No.	
Vermin and Noxious Weeds Act 1949	No.	
Victorian Mining Accident Relief Fund (Winding-up) Act 1949	No.	
Water Act 1949	No.	
Water Supply Loan and Application Act 1949	No.	
Wrongs (Tort-feasors) Act 1949	No.	

== Sources ==
- "1949 Victorian Historical Acts". AustLII.
