= List of acts of the Parliament of Victoria from 1881 =

This is a list of acts of the Parliament of Victoria, Australia for the year 1881.

== 1881 ==
Continuing the first session of the eleventh parliament of Victoria.

| Short title, or popular name | Citation | Royal assent |
Long title
| | 45 Vict. No. 686 | 21 March 1881 |
An Act to provide for the granting of certain Loans for Water Supply in the country districts for the service of the year ending the thirtieth day of June One thousand eight hundred and eighty-one.
| | 44 Vict. No. 687 | 2 May 1881 |
An Act to further amend "The Local Government Act 1874." (Note: Local Government Act 1874 (38 Vict. No. 506)) (Repealed by Local Government Act 1890 (54 Vict. No. 1112))
| | 45 Vict. No. 688 | 2 May 1881 |
An Act to remove doubts as to the power of Shire Councils to construct and repair Weirs Dams Reservoirs and other works for Water Supply. (Repealed by Local Government Act 1890 (54 Vict. No. 1112))
| | 44 Vict. No. 689 | 2 May 1881 |
An Act to amend an Act (Note: Western Port Coal Mining Company's Act 1871 (35 Vict. No. 410)) intituled "An Act to authorize the 'Western Port Coal Mining Company Limited' to construct a Tramway or Railway and to take and purchase certain lands for that purpose" and to amend an Act (Note: Western Port Coal Mining Company's Act Amendment Act 1873 (37 Vict. No. 471)) intituled "An Act to amend and continue an Act intituled 'An Act to authorize the Western Port Coal Mining Company Limited to construct a Tramway or Railway and to take and purchase certain lands for that purpose.'"
| | No. 690 | |
An Act to apply out of the Consolidated Revenue the sum of Three hundred thousand pounds to the service of the year One thousand eight hundred and eighty and eighty-one.
| University Act 1881 (repealed) | 45 Vict. No. 691 | 7 June 1881 |
An Act to amend the law relating to the University of Melbourne. (Repealed by University Act 1890 (54 Vict. No. 1151))
| | 45 Vict. No. 692 | 8 June 1881 |
An Act to apply out of the Consolidated Revenue the sum of Three hundred thousand pounds to the service of the year One thousand eight hundred and eighty and eighty-one.
| | 45 Vict. No. 693 | 27 June 1881 |
An Act for the further Amendment of the Law relating to Neglected and Criminal Children. (Repealed by Juvenile Offenders Act 1887 (51 Vict. No. 951))
| | 45 Vict. No. 694 | 6 July 1881 |
An Act to apply out of the Consolidated Revenue the sum of Four hundred and seventy-four thousand seven hundred and three pounds to the service of the year One thousand eight hundred and eighty and eighty-one.
| | 45 Vict. No. 695 | 2 August 1881 |
An Act to apply a sum out of the Consolidated Revenue to the service of the year ended on the last day of June One thousand eight hundred and eighty-one and to appropriate the Supplies granted in this Session of Parliament.
| Duties of Customs Act 1881 (repealed) | 45 Vict. No. 696 | 2 August 1881 |
An Act for granting to Her Majesty certain Duties of Customs, for repealing and altering certain other Duties, and for other purposes. (Repealed by Customs Act 1883 (47 Vict. No. 768) and Duties of Customs Act 1883 (47 Vict. No. 769))

The second session of the eleventh parliament of Victoria.

| Short title, or popular name | Citation | Royal assent |
Long title
| | 45 Vict. No. 697 | 5 August 1881 |
An Act to apply out of the Consolidated Revenue the sum of Nine hundred and fifty thousand pounds to the service of the year One thousand eight hundred and eighty-one and two.
| | 45 Vict. No. 698 | 9 August 1881 |
An Act to continue and amend "The Tobacco Act 1880." (Note: Tobacco Act 1880 (44 Vict. No. 668))
| | 45 Vict. No. 699 | 9 August 1881 |
An Act to continue and amend "The Beer Duty Act 1880." (Note: Beer Duty Act 1880 (44 Vict. No. 669))
| | 45 Vict. No. 700 | 28 September 1881 |
An Act to apply out of the Consolidated Revenue the sum of Nine hundred and seventy-six thousand pounds to the service of the year One thousand eight hundred and eighty-one and two.
| | 45 Vict. No. 701 | 18 October 1881 |
An Act to apply temporarily out of the Consolidated Revenue or out of "The Railway Loan Account 1878" certain sums of money for railways and other works.
| Legislative Council Act 1881 (repealed) | 45 Vict. No. 702 | 28 November 1881 (Note: This act was reserved for approval by Her Majesty.) |
An Act for the Reform of the Constitution. (Repealed by Constitution Act Amendment Act 1890 (54 Vict. No. 1075))
| | 45 Vict. No. 703 | 29 November 1881 |
An Act to amend "The Victorian Exhibitions Act 1878." (Note: Victorian Exhibitions Act 1878 (42 Vict. No. 619))
| | 45 Vict. No. 704 | 29 November 1881 |
An Act to further continue and amend "The Tobacco Act 1880."
| | 45 Vict. No. 705 | 29 November 1881 |
An Act to further continue and amend "The Beer Duty Act 1880."
| Victoria Racing Club Act 1881 (repealed) | 45 Vict. No. 706 | 29 November 1881 |
An Act to make valid the grant of an annuity by the Victoria Racing Club to the widow and children of the late Robert Cooper Bagot, and for other purposes. (Repealed by Victoria Racing Club Act 2006 (No. 40 of 2006))
| | 45 Vict. No. 707 | 24 December 1881 |
An Act to sanction the issue and application of certain sums of money as Loans for Water Supply in the country districts for the service of the year ending the thirtieth day of June One thousand eight hundred and eighty-two.
| | 45 Vict. No. 708 | 24 December 1881 |
An Act to further amend "The Electoral Act 1865." (Note: Electoral Act 1865 (29 Vict. No. 279)) (Repealed by Constitution Act Amendment Act 1890 (54 Vict. No. 1075))
| Residence Areas Act 1881 (repealed) | 45 Vict. No. 709 | 24 December 1881 |
An Act to amend the Law relating to Residence Areas in Mining Districts. (Repealed by Mines Act 1890 (54 Vict. No. 1120))
| | 45 Vict. No. 710 | 24 December 1881 |
An Act to abolish the payment of Pensions or Superannuation or other allowances in the case of Persons hereafter entering the Public Service. (Repealed by Public Service Act 1890 (54 Vict. No. 1133))
| Local Government Amendment Act 1881 (repealed) | 45 Vict. No. 711 | 24 December 1881 |
An Act to amend "The Local Government Act 1874." (Note: Local Government Act 1874 (38 Vict. No. 506)) (Repealed by Local Government Act 1890 (54 Vict. No. 1112))
| Protection of Animals Act 1881 (repealed) | 45 Vict. No. 712 | 24 December 1881 |
An Act for the Protection of Animals. (Repealed by Animals Protection Act 1890 (54 Vict. No. 1064))
| | 45 Vict. No. 713 | 24 December 1881 |
An Act to continue "The Land Act 1869" (Note: Land Act 1869 (33 Vict. No. 360)) and Acts amending the same.
| Expiring Laws Continuance Act 1881 | 45 Vict. No. 714 | 24 December 1881 |
An Act to continue various Expiring Laws.
| Tea Act 1881 (repealed) | 45 Vict. No. 715 | 24 December 1881 |
An Act to regulate the Importation and Examination of Tea. (Repealed by Customs Act 1883 (47 Vict. No. 768))
| Victorian Water Conservation Act 1881 | 45 Vict. No. 716 | 24 December 1881 |
An Act to provide for the Conservation and Distribution of Water throughout Victoria.
| Railway Loan Act 1881 | 45 Vict. No. 717 | 24 December 1881 |
An Act to authorize the raising of Money for Railways and for other purposes.
| Geelong District Vine Disease Act 1881 (repealed) | 45 Vict. No. 718 | 24 December 1881 |
An Act to amend "The Phylloxera Vine Disease Act 1880." (Note: Phylloxera Vine Disease Act 1880 (44 Vict. No. 684)) (Repealed by Vine Disease Act 1890 (54 Vict. No. 1155))
| Regulation of Mines Act 1881 (repealed) | 45 Vict. No. 719 | 24 December 1881 |
An Act to amend the Regulation of Mines Statute 1877. (Note: Regulation of Mines Statute 1877 (41 Vict. No. 583)) (Repealed by Regulation of Mines and Mining Machinery Act 1883 (47 Vict. No. 783))
| Legislative Council Elections for 1882 Act 1881 (repealed) | 45 Vict. No. 720 | 24 December 1881 |
An Act to amend "The Legislative Council Act 1881" (Note: Legislative Council Act 1881 (45 Vict. No. 702)) so far as relates to the First periodical Elections to be held thereunder in the year One thousand eight hundred and eighty-two, and to the First preparation of the General Rolls and Rolls of Ratepaying Electors. (Repealed by Constitution Act Amendment Act 1890 (54 Vict. No. 1075))
| | 45 Vict. No. 721 | 24 December 1881 |
An Act to amend "The Rabbit Suppression Act 1880." (Note: Rabbit Suppression Act 1880 (44 Vict. No. 683))
| Companies Act 1881 (repealed) | 45 Vict. No. 722 | 24 December 1881 |
An Act to amend "The Companies Statute 1864." (Note: Companies Statute 1864 (27 Vict. No. 190)) (Repealed by Companies Act 1890 (54 Vict. No. 1074))
| Chinese Act 1881 (repealed) | 45 Vict. No. 723 | 24 December 1881 |
An Act to amend "The Chinese Immigrants Statute 1865." (Note: Chinese Immigrants Statute 1865 (28 Vict. No. 259)) (Repealed by Chinese Act 1890 (54 Vict. No. 1073))
| | 45 Vict. No. 724 | 24 December 1881 |
An Act to apply a sum out of the Consolidated Revenue to the service of the year ending on the last day of June One thousand eight hundred and eighty-two and to appropriate the Supplies granted in this Session of Parliament.

== Sources ==
- "1881 Victorian Historical Acts". AustLII.
