= List of acts of the Parliament of Victoria from 1968 =

This is a list of acts of the Parliament of Victoria, Australia for the year 1968.

== 1968 ==
Short title, or popular name	Citation	Royal assent
Long title
Constitution Act Amendment (Governor's Salary) Act 1968	No. 7656	28 February 1968 (Note: This act was reserved for approval by Her Majesty.)
An Act to amend Section 10 of The Constitution Act Amendment Act 1958. (Note: Constitution Act Amendment Act 1958 (No. 6224))
Administration and Probate (Amendment) Act 1968	No. 7663	2 April 1968
An Act to amend Part I. of the Administration and Probate Act 1958. (Note: Administration and Probate Act 1958 (No. 6191))
Tyabb to Long Island Railway Construction Act 1968 (repealed)	No. 7667	2 April 1968
An Act to authorize the Construction of a Line of Railway to connect the Railway from Frankston to Crib Point with Long Island, and for other purposes. (Repealed by Transport Act 1983 (No. 9921))
	No. 7673	18 April 1968
An Act to apply out of the Consolidated Revenue the sum of One hundred and eleven million and sixteen thousand six hundred and fifty dollars to the service of the year One thousand nine hundred and sixty-eight and One thousand nine hundred and sixty-nine.
Constitution Act Amendment Act 1968	No. 7679	7 May 1968
An Act to amend Sections 25 and 354 of The Constitution Act Amendment Act 1958.
Acts Interpretation (Prior Convictions) Act 1968	No. 7681	7 May 1968
An Act to amend Section 7 of the Acts Interpretation Act 1958. (Note: Acts Interpretation Act 1958 (No. 6189))
Aerial Spraying Control (Amendment) Act 1968	No. 7682	7 May 1968
An Act to amend the Aerial Spraying Control Act 1966. (Note: Aerial Spraying Control Act 1966 (No. 7403))
Royal Society for the Prevention of Cruelty to Animals Act 1968	No. 7690	7 May 1968
An Act relating to the Incorporation and Administration of the Royal Society for the Prevention of Cruelty to Animals and for other purposes.
Liquor Control Act 1968	No. 7695	7 May 1968
An Act to consolidate and amend the Law relating to the Sale Disposal and Consumption of Liquor, to establish a Commission to control the Liquor Industry and for other purposes.
West Moorabool Water Board Act 1968 (repealed)	No. 7698	7 May 1968
An Act to provide for the Construction Maintenance and Operation of Water Storage Works on the West Moorabool River and the Constitution of a Board to Construct Operate and Maintain the said Works, to make Provision concerning the Supply of Water from the said Works, and for other purposes. (Repealed by Water Act 1989 (No. 80 of 1989))
	No. 7702	2 October 1968
An Act to apply out of the Consolidated Revenue the sum of One hundred and nineteen million six hundred and seventy-eight thousand three hundred dollars to the service of the year One thousand nine hundred and sixty-eight and One thousand nine hundred and sixty-nine.
Abolition of Bailiwicks Act 1968	No. 7703	15 October 1968
An Act to abolish Bailiwicks.
Footscray (Recreation Ground) Lands Act 1968	No. 7704	15 October 1968
An Act relating to Certain Lands in the City of Footscray, Parish of Cut-paw-paw, and to authorize the Granting of Leases of a Certain Part thereof and for other purposes.
National Parks (Amendment) Act 1968	No. 7708	22 October 1968
An Act to include additional Land in certain National Parks, to amend the National Parks Act 1958 (Note: National Parks Act 1958 (No. 6326)) and for other purposes.
Agricultural Education (Amendment) Act 1968	No. 7712	30 October 1968
An Act to repeal Sections 3, 4 and 5 of the Agricultural Education Act 1958. (Note: Agricultural Education Act 1958 (No. 6195))
State Coal Mines (Winding Up) Act 1968 (repealed)	No. 7715	14 November 1968
An Act to make Provision with respect to the Closing of Certain State Coal Mines, to repeal Part II. of the Coal Mines Act 1958 (Note: Coal Mines Act 1958 (No. 6221)) and for other purposes. (Repealed by Coal Mines (Amendment) Act 1987 (No. 6 of 1987))
Auction Sales (Night Auctions) Act 1968	No. 7717	14 November 1968
An Act to re-enact Section 30 of the Auction Sales Act 1958. (Note: Auction Sales Act 1958 (No. 6202))
Teaching Service (Amendment) Act 1968	No. 7719	14 November 1968
An Act to amend the Teaching Service Act 1958 (Note: Teaching Service Act 1958 (No. 6391)) and for other purposes.
Aboriginal Affairs (Amendment) Act 1968	No. 7721	26 November 1968
An Act to amend the Aboriginal Affairs Act 1967. (Note: Aboriginal Affairs Act 1967 (No. 7574))
Parliamentary Salaries and Superannuation Act 1968 or the Parliamentary Salaries, Allowances and Superannuation Act 1968	No. 7723	26 November 1968
An Act relating to Parliamentary Salaries and Allowances and Parliamentary Superannuation and for other purposes.
Stock Diseases Act 1968 (repealed)	No. 7724	6 November 1968
An Act to consolidate and amend the Law relating to Diseases in Stock. (Repealed by Livestock Disease Control Act 1994 (No. 115 of 1994))
Parliamentary Committees Act 1968 (repealed)	No. 7727	2 December 1968
An Act to consolidate and amend the Law relating to certain Committees of the Legislative Council and of the Legislative Assembly and to certain Joint Committees of the Legislative Council and the Legislative Assembly and for other purposes. (Repealed by Parliamentary Committees Act 2003 (No. 110 of 2003))
Forests (Amendment) Act 1968	No. 7740	2 December 1968
An Act to amend the Forests Act 1958. (Note: Forests Act 1958 (No. 6254))
Water Supply Loan Application Act 1968 (repealed)	No. 7743	10 December 1968
An Act to sanction the Issue and Application of Loan Money for Works and other Purposes relating to Irrigation Water Supply Drainage Sewerage Flood Protection and River Improvement, and other purposes. (Repealed by Treasury Legislation (Repeal) Act 2005 (No. 73 of 2005))
National Parks (Little Desert and Mount Richmond) Act 1968	No. 7776	18 December 1968
An Act to establish a Married Women's Superannuation Fund and make Provision on a Contributory Basis for Benefits for Certain Officers and Employés and to amend the Teaching Service Act 1958 and for other purposes.
Fisheries Act 1968 (repealed)	No. 7780	18 December 1968
An Act to re-enact with Amendments the Law relating to Fisheries. (Repealed by Fisheries Act 1995 (No. 92 of 1995))
	No. 7784	18 December 1968
An Act to apply out of the Consolidated Revenue the sum of Four million eight hundred and two thousand seven hundred and three dollars to the service of the year One thousand nine hundred and sixty-seven and One thousand nine hundred and sixty-eight.
	No. 7785	10 December 1968
An Act to apply a sum out of the Consolidated Revenue to the service of the year ending on the thirtieth day of June One thousand nine hundred and sixty-nine and to appropriate the Supplies granted in this and the last preceding Session of Parliament.
Bread Industry (Legal Proceedings) Act 1968	No.	
Building Societies (Amendment) Act 1968	No.	
Cemeteries (Exhumation Licences) Act 1968	No.	
Cheltenham Cemetery Lands Exchange Act 1968	No.	
Children's Court (Procedure) Act 1968	No.	
Children's Welfare (Amendment) Act 1968	No.	
Children's Welfare (Prosecutions) Act 1968	No.	
Coal Mines (Pensions) Act 1968	No.	
Commercial Goods Vehicles (Amendment) Act 1968	No.	
Consumers Protection (Amendment) Act 1968	No.	
Country Roads (Amendment) Act 1968	No.	
Country Roads (Borrowing Powers) Act 1968	No.	
Country Roads (Declarations) Act 1968	No.	
County Court (Jurisdiction) Act 1968	No.	
Crimes (Amendment) Act 1968	No.	
Crimes (Evidence) Act 1968	No.	
Dandenong Valley Authority (Amendment) Act 1968	No.	
Door to Door (Sales) (Amendment) Act 1968	No.	
Drought Relief Act 1968	No.	
Evidence (Attestations) Act 1968	No.	
Fences Act 1968	No.	
Goods (Textile Products) Act 1968	No.	
Hairdressers Registration (Amendment) Act 1968	No.	
Health (Amendment) Act 1968	No.	
Housing (Amendment) Act 1968	No.	
Inflammable Liquids (Petrol Service Stations) Act 1968	No.	
Juries (Amendment) Act 1968	No.	
Justices (General Sessions Jurisdiction) Act 1968	No.	
Kew Lands (Grant Amendment) Act 1968	No.	
Kyneton Cattle Market Lands Exchange Act 1968	No.	
La Trobe University (Amendment) Act 1968	No.	
Labour and Industry (Amendment) Act 1968	No.	
Labour and Industry (Miscellaneous Provisions) Act 1968	No.	
Labour and Industry (Shop Trading Hours) Act 1968	No.	
Land (Special Land) Act 1968	No.	
Land Tax Act 1968	No.	
Latrobe Valley (Amendment) Act 1968	No.	
Liquor Control (Amendment) Act 1968	No.	
Local Government (Amendment) Act 1968	No.	
Lotteries Gaming and Betting (Penalties) Act 1968	No.	
Margarine (Amendment) Act 1968	No.	
Margarine (Penalties) Act 1968	No.	
Marketing of Primary Products (Egg and Egg Pulp Marketing Board) Act 1968	No.	
Marriage (Liability in Tort) Act 1968	No.	
Medical (Organ Transplants) Act 1968	No.	
Melbourne and Metropolitan Board of Works (Amendment) Act 1968	No.	
Melbourne and Metropolitan Board of Works (Borrowing Powers) Act 1968	No.	
Melbourne Harbor Trust (Borrowing Powers) Act 1968	No.	
Melbourne Harbor Trust (Exchange of Yarraville Lands) Act 1968	No.	
Melbourne Harbor Trust Land Act 1968	No.	
Melbourne Sailors' Home (Powers of Trustees) Act 1968	No.	
Milk Board (Amendment) Act 1968	No.	
Mines (Amendment) Act 1968	No.	
Motor Car (Further Amendment) Act 1968	No.	
Municipalities (Commutation of Licensing Payments) Act 1968	No.	
Perpetuities and Accumulations Act 1968	No.	
Pesticides (Proclamations) Act 1968	No.	
Police Assistance Compensation Act 1968	No.	
Police Offences (Publications) Act 1968	No.	
Portland Harbor Trust (Borrowing Powers) Act 1968	No.	
Pounds (Amendment) Act 1968	No.	
Property Law (Amendment) Act 1968	No.	
Public Lands and Works (Amendment) Act 1968	No.	
Public Works Loan Application Act 1968	No.	
Racing (Amendment) Act 1968	No.	
Racing (Trotting Meetings) Act 1968	No.	
Railway Loan Application Act 1968	No.	
Revocation and Excision of Crown Reservations Act 1968	No.	
Road Traffic (Crown Land) Act 1968	No.	
Road Traffic (Infringements) Act 1968	No.	
Second-hand Dealers (Amendment) Act 1968	No.	
Settlement Grants and Mortgages Act 1968	No.	
Sewerage Districts Act 1968	No.	
Shearers Accommodation (Amendment) Act 1968	No.	
Shrine of Remembrance Trustees (Powers) Act 1968	No.	
State Electricity Commission (Amendment) Act 1968	No.	
State Electricity Commission Act 1968	No.	
State Forests Loan Application Act 1968	No.	
Stock (Artificial Breeding) (Amendment) Act 1968	No.	
Stock Medicines (Amendment) Act 1968	No.	
Sunday Entertainment (Amendment) Act 1968	No.	
Superannuation (Amendment) Act 1968	No.	
Swine (Application of Fund) Act 1968	No.	
Tomato Processing Industry (Amendment) Act 1968	No.	
Town and Country Planning (Amendment) Act 1968	No.	
Transport Regulation (Amendment) Act 1968	No.	
Valuation of Land (Amendment) Act 1968	No.	
Victorian Limbless Soldiers' Provident Fund (Closing) Act 1968	No.	
Water Act 1968	No.	
West Melbourne Lands Act 1968	No.	
Wheat Industry Stabilization Act 1968	No.	

== Sources ==
- "1968 Victorian Historical Acts". AustLII.
