= List of acts of the Parliament of Victoria from 1943 =

This is a list of acts of the Parliament of Victoria, Australia for the year 1943.

== 1943 ==
Short title, or popular name	Citation	Royal assent
Long title
	No. 4943	1 July 1943
An Act to apply out of the Consolidated Revenue the sum of Three million eight hundred and fifty-three thousand four hundred and fifty-eight pounds to the service of the year One thousand nine hundred and forty-three and One thousand nine hundred and forty-four.
	No. 4944	1 July 1943
An Act to apply out of the Consolidated Revenue the sum of Eight hundred and seventy-five thousand five hundred and nineteen pounds to the service of the year One thousand nine hundred and forty-two and One thousand nine hundred and forty-three.
	No. 4947	1 September 1943
An Act to apply out of the Consolidated Revenue the sum of Three million seven hundred and forty-five thousand and nineteen pounds to the service of the year One thousand nine hundred and forty-three and One thousand nine hundred and forty-four.
National Security (Emergency Powers) Continuation Act 1943 (repealed)	No. 4949	6 September 1943
An Act to continue the Operation of the National Security (Emergency Powers) Act 1939. (Note: National Security (Emergency Powers) Act 1939 (No. 4645)) (Repealed by National Security (Repeal) Act 1945 (No. 5073))
Commonwealth Powers Act 1943	No. 4950	8 September 1943 (Note: This act was reserved for approval by His Majesty.)
An Act to refer certain Matters to the Parliament of the Commonwealth until the Expiration of Five Years after Australia ceases to be engaged in Hostilities in the Present War.
	No. 4951	20 October 1943
An Act to apply out of the Consolidated Revenue the sum of Two million three hundred and seven thousand nine hundred and four pounds to the service of the year One thousand nine hundred and forty-two and One thousand nine hundred and forty-three.
State Schools (Bush Fire Relief) Act 1943	No. 4954	25 October 1943
An Act to provide that a certain Fund for the Relief of Children who suffered through certain Bush Fires in Victoria be available for certain like Objects, and to make Provision for an Increase of the Number of Trustees of the said Fund.
	No. 4955	3 November 1943
An Act to apply out of the Consolidated Revenue the sum of Three million eight hundred and thirty-three thousand seven hundred and twenty-two pounds to the service of the year One thousand nine hundred and forty-three and One thousand nine hundred and forty-four.
Forests (Exchange of Lands) Act 1943	No. 4960	15 November 1943
An Act to make provision with respect to the Exchange of Forest Land for Unoccupied Crown Land.
Railway Construction (Extensions) Act 1943 (repealed)	No. 4962	15 November 1943
An Act relating to the Camperdown and Curdie's River Railway the Wedderburn Road and Wedderburn Railway and the Bowser to Peechelba Railway. (Repealed by Transport Act 1983 (No. 9921))
Administration and Probate Duties Act 1943	No. 4964	22 November 1943
An Act to continue the Operation of Part III. of the Finance Act 1930. (Note: Finance Act 1930 (No. 3889))
Partially Blinded Soldiers Fund Act 1943 (repealed)	No. 4970	29 November 1943
An Act to validate the Trusts upon which certain Funds for the Benefit of Partially Blinded Soldiers are held, and for purposes connected therewith. (Repealed by Statute Law Revision Act 1995 (No. 11 of 1995))
Administration and Probate (War Service) Act 1943	No. 4982	6 December 1943
An Act to amend Section Two of the Administration and Probate (War Service) Act 1940. (Note: Administration and Probate (War Service) Act 1940 (No. 4756))
Melbourne (Widening of Streets) Act 1943 (repealed)	No. 4991	23 December 1943
An Act to amend Sections Three Four and Seven of the Melbourne (Widening of Streets) Act 1940. (Note: Melbourne (Widening of Streets) Act 1940 (No. 4760)) (Repealed by Melbourne (Widening of Streets) (Repeal) Act 1986 (No. 97 of 1986))
	No. 4998	23 December 1943
An Act to apply a sum out of the Consolidated Revenue to the service of the year ending on the thirtieth day of June One thousand nine hundred and forty-four and to appropriate the Supplies granted in this Session of Parliament.
Coal Mine Workers Pensions Act 1943	No.	
Coal Mines Regulation Act 1943	No.	
Country Roads (Forest Roads and Stock Routes) Act 1943	No.	
Country Roads Board Fund Act 1943	No.	
Discharged Servicemen's Preference Act 1943	No.	
Education Act 1943	No.	
Factories and Shops (Chairmen of Wages Boards) Act 1943	No.	
Factories and Shops (Saturday Half-holiday) Act 1943	No.	
Farmers Debts Adjustment Act 1943	No.	
Farmers Protection (Amendment) Act 1943	No.	
Financial Emergency (Grants and Funds) Act 1943	No.	
Forests Act 1943	No.	
Grain Elevators Act 1943	No.	
Housing Act 1943	No.	
Instruments (Insurance Contracts) Act 1943	No.	
Land Settlement (Acquisition) Act 1943	No.	
Land Settlement Loan and Application Act 1943	No.	
Land Tax Act 1943	No.	
Local Government (Valuations) Act 1943	No.	
Lunacy Act 1943	No.	
Melbourne and Metropolitan Board of Works (Contributions) Act 1943	No.	
Mental Hygiene (Mode of Citation) Act 1943	No.	
Milk and Dairy Supervision Act 1943	No.	
Milk Pasteurization Act 1943	No.	
Mines (Petroleum) Act 1943	No.	
Ministry of Health Act 1943	No.	
Petrol Pumps (Licence Fees) Act 1943	No.	
Public Works Loan and Application Act 1943	No.	
Railway Loan Application Act 1943	No.	
Sewerage Districts Act 1943	No.	
South Melbourne to Melbourne Tramway Construction Act 1943	No.	
Springvale Necropolis Land Act 1943	No.	
Stamps (Increased Duty Continuance) Act 1943	No.	
Stamps Act 1943	No.	
State Development Act 1943	No.	
State Forests Loan Application Act 1943	No.	
Superannuation (Contributions) Act 1943	No.	
Surplus Revenue Act 1943	No.	
Water Act 1943	No.	
Water Supply Loans Application Act 1943	No.	
Workers' Compensation Act 1943	No.	

== Sources ==
- "1943 Victorian Historical Acts". AustLII.
