= List of acts of the Parliament of Victoria from 1894 =

This is a list of acts of the Parliament of Victoria, Australia for the year 1894.

== 1894 ==
Short title, or popular name	Citation	Royal assent
Long title
Marine Act 1892 (Note: Although passed in the year 1892, and given a short title ending '...Act 1892', the need to obtain approval for this act from the United Kingdom meant it was not proclaimed until the year 1894.) (repealed)	57 Vict. No. 1357	25 January 1894 (Note: This act was reserved for approval by Her Majesty.)
An Act relating to the Marking of Load Lines on Ships. (Repealed by Marine Act 1915 (6 Geo. V. No. 2688))
Ministers' Salaries Retrenchment Act 1893 (Note: Although passed in the year 1893, and given a short title ending '...Act 1893', the need to obtain approval for this act from the United Kingdom meant it was not proclaimed until the year 1894.)	58 Vict. No. 1358	20 March 1894
An Act providing for the Reduction for Three Years of the Salaries of Responsible Ministers of the Crown.
Special and other Appropriations Retrenchment Act 1893	58 Vict. No. 1359	20 March 1894
An Act providing for the Reduction during Three Years of the Salaries of certain Officers under the Constitution Act (Note: Constitution Act 1855 (19 Vict.)) or Part IX. of The Constitution Act Amendment Act 1890 (Note: Constitution Act Amendment Act 1890 (54 Vict. No. 1075)) or whose Salaries are provided for by special appropriations.
Marine Act 1893 (No. 2) (repealed)	58 Vict. No. 1360	1 May 1894
An Act to amend the Sixty-fifth Section of the Marine Act 1890. (Note: Marine Act 1890 (57 Vict. No. 1357)) (Repealed by Marine Act 1915 (6 Geo. V. No. 2688))
	58 Vict. No. 1361	1 August 1893
An Act to apply out of the Consolidated Revenue the sum of One million two hundred and thirty-four thousand four hundred and eighty-two pounds to the service of the year One thousand eight hundred and ninety-four and ninety-five.
Health Act 1894 (repealed)	58 Vict. No. 1362	6 August 1894
An Act to amend the Health Act 1890. (Note: Health Act 1890 (54 Vict. No. 1098)) (Repealed by Health Act 1915 (6 Geo. V. No. 2665))
	58 Vict. No. 1363	1 November 1893
An Act to apply out of the Consolidated Revenue the sum of Ninety-five thousand five hundred and eighty-one pounds to the service of the year One thousand eight hundred and ninety-three and ninety-four and the sum of One million one hundred and twenty-nine thousand one hundred and sixty-eight pounds to the service of the year One thousand eight hundred and ninety-four and ninety-five.
Licensed Premises Act 1894 (repealed)	58 Vict. No. 1364	29 November 1894
An Act for the Better Protection of Owners and Mortgagees of Licensed Premises. (Repealed by Licensing Act 1915 (6 Geo. V. No. 2683))
Local Government Act 1894 (repealed)	58 Vict. No. 1365	29 November 1893
An Act to declare the Law relating to Appeals to Justices against Municipal Valuations. (Repealed by Local Government Act 1903 (3 Edw. VII. No. 1893))
Municipal Overdrafts (Indemnity) Act 1894	58 Vict. No. 1366	29 November 1893
An Act to indemnify the Councillors of various Municipalities for Borrowing Moneys by Overdrafts on Bankers for the purposes of their Municipalities contrary to the provisions of the Local Government Act 1890 (Note: Local Government Act 1890 (54 Vict. No. 1112)) and for other purposes.
Melbourne Harbor Trust Act 1894 (repealed)	58 Vict. No. 1367	31 December 1894
An Act to further amend the Melbourne Harbor Trust Act 1890. (Note: Melbourne Harbor Trust Act 1890 (54 Vict. No. 1119)) (Repealed by Melbourne Harbor Trust Act 1915 (6 Geo. V. No. 2697)

== Sources ==
- "1894 Victorian Historical Acts". AustLII.
