= Australian States Constitution Act 1907 =

Public General Act of the Parliament of the United Kingdom

- Act of Parliament
- Parliament of the United Kingdom
- Long title: An Act to amend the Law relating to the Reservation for His Majesty's pleasure of Bills passed by the Legislatures of the States forming part of the Commonwealth of Australia, and to confirm certain Acts passed by those Legislatures.
- Citation: 7 Edw. 7. c. 7

Dates
- Royal assent: 2 August 1907
Other legislation
Repealed by	Statute Law (Repeals) Act 1989

Status: Repealed

Text of statute as originally enacted

The Australian States Constitution Act 1907 (7 Edw. 7. c. 7) was an act of the Parliament of the United Kingdom that clarified and simplified the legal requirements for reserving state parliamentary bills for royal assent of the monarch (acting on the advice of UK ministers). Enacted on 2 August 1907, the legislation resolved legal ambiguities that had persisted since the creation of the Commonwealth of Australia in 1901 regarding the mechanism by which state constitutional amendments and executive matters were submitted to the Crown.

== Background ==
Following the federation of the six Australian colonies into the Commonwealth of Australia on 1 January 1901 under the Commonwealth of Australia Constitution Act 1900, the former colonies became states while retaining their individual colonial constitutions. Under earlier Imperial statutes—such as the Australian Constitutions Act 1842 (5 & 6 Vict. c. 76), the Australian Constitutions Act 1844 (7 & 8 Vict. c. 74), the Australian Constitutions Act 1850 (13 & 14 Vict. c. 59), and the Australian Constitutions Act 1862 (25 & 26 Vict. c. 11)—state governors were legally required to "reserve" certain categories of colonial legislation for the direct signification of the sovereign's pleasure (by reference back to UK authorities) rather than granting immediate royal assent in the state. By the early 1900s, uncertainty surrounding which specific state bills still required formal reservation created procedural delays and potential invalidity risks for state legislation. Imperial authorities and state premiers sought a definitive statutory list to streamline state legislative processes.

== Key provisions ==
=== Standardisation of bill reservation ===
Section 1 of the act codified and limited the specific classes of state parliamentary bills that state governors were required to reserve for the king's pleasure. These were restricted primarily to:

- Bills altering the constitution of the legislature of the state or of either house thereof.
- Bills affecting the salary of the governor of the state.
- Bills required to be reserved under any special provision of an act of the parliament of the state or an Imperial act.

By explicitly defining these categories, the act repealed confusing older Imperial directives, removing the general requirement to reserve minor administrative or electoral bills that had previously clogged Imperial communications.

=== Retrospective validation ===
To ensure stability in state law, section 2 of the act provided retrospective validation for any previously enacted Australian state laws that had inadvertently failed to follow the mandatory reservation procedures prescribed by earlier Imperial statutes. This provision confirmed the legal validity of numerous state statutes passed between 1901 and 1907 whose constitutional status had been questioned due to technical non-reservation.

=== Exceptions and governor's discretion ===
The act clarified that state governors were not required to reserve bills in emergency situations or bills that made minor or technical constitutional alterations, provided that the governor had received royal instructions authorizing assent or if the bill contained an urgent operational clause.

== Legacy and constitutional impact ==
The Australian States Constitution Act 1907 served as a vital transitional mechanism that preserved state constitutional autonomy within the federal system while reducing direct Imperial supervision over routine State legislative matters. It remained the governing standard for the reservation of state constitutional legislation for nearly eight decades until the passage of the Australia Act 1986, which formally abolished the requirement to reserve state bills for royal signification and ended remaining Imperial legal oversight over the Australian states.

== See also ==
- Disallowance and reservation

== Bibliography ==
- Castles, Alex (1982). An Australian Legal History. Sydney: Law Book Company. ISBN 978-0-455-19609-1.
- Lumb, Richard D. (1991). The Constitution of the Australian States (5th ed.). University of Queensland Press. ISBN 978-0-7022-2218-4.
