= New South Wales Act 1823 =

Act of the Parliament of the United Kingdom

- Act of Parliament
- Parliament of the United Kingdom
- Long title: An Act to provide, until the First Day of July One thousand eight hundred and twenty-seven, and until the End of the next Session of Parliament, for the better Administration of Justice in New South Wales and Van Diemen's Land, and for the more effectual Government thereof and for other Purposes relating thereto.
- Citation: 4 Geo. 4. c. 96
- Territorial extent: United Kingdom

Dates
- Royal assent: 19 July 1823
- Commencement: 19 July 1823 (Note: The Acts of Parliament (Commencement) Act 1793.)
- Expired: 1 July 1827 (Note: Section 45.)
- Repealed: 1 March 1829
Other legislation
Repealed by	Australian Courts Act 1828

Status: Repealed

Text of statute as originally enacted

The New South Wales Act 1823 (4 Geo. 4. c. 96), or New South Wales Jurisdiction Act 1823, was an act of the Parliament of the United Kingdom, which established the New South Wales Legislative Council and the Supreme Court of New South Wales, in addition to the Supreme Court of Van Diemen's Land.

== Background ==
The act was passed in response to growing criticism in the Colony of New South Wales of the lack of a proper superior court as well the lack of a proper responsible government. At the time, the Governor of New South Wales had virtually unlimited powers and could only be overruled by the Colonial Office in the United Kingdom. In 1819, Commissioner John Bigge was sent from London to report on the state of the colony. Francis Forbes, formerly Chief Justice of Newfoundland, was heavily involved in the drafting of the bill presented to Parliament.

== Provisions ==
The act authorised the creation of the New South Wales Legislative Council, alongside the Supreme Court of New South Wales which was to be a court of equivalent authority to that of the King's Bench in the United Kingdom. Moreover, it established the office of Chief Justice of New South Wales, which was an ex officio member of the legislative council who also had to certify any laws as being proper. Additionally, it authorised the eventual separation of Van Diemen's Land (now Tasmania) from the colony of New South Wales, and created the Supreme Court of Van Diemen's Land, which is now the Supreme Court of Tasmania, which contained the Chief Justice of Tasmania.

== Trial by civilian jury ==
A petition was circulated in 1819 seeking both trial by civilian jury and the establishment of representative government. This was one of the matters considered by Commissioner Bigge in his second report, who recommended against trial by a civilian jury. The House of Commons had narrowly defeated a proposal that civilian juries be introduced for criminal trials, prior to passing the Act which prescribed military juries for criminal trials before the Supreme Court. There was a disagreement between the Attorney-General of NSW, Saxe Bannister and the Solicitor-General of NSW, John Stephen as to the meaning of the Act. Castles describes the case that followed as a fabricated cause, set in train by D'Arcy Wentworth, who was one of the magistrates who had failed to assemble juries, but had been one of the leaders of the 1819 petition seeking their introduction. The matter was argued before the newly created Supreme Court in which Chief Justice Forbes held that civilian juries were required for Court of Quarter Sessions. Trial by civilian jury was short-lived however as it was abolished by the Australian Courts Act 1828 (9 Geo. 4. c. 83 (Imp)).

== Legacy ==
The act is seen within Australia as being the first steps toward representative democracy. The act authorised the issuing of letters patent by the Monarch of the United Kingdom.

In consequence of this legislation, Letters Patent establishing the New South Wales Supreme Court were sealed on 13 October 1823, and proclaimed in Sydney on 17 May 1824. They are known as the Third Charter of Justice.

The Murders Abroad Act 1817 (57 Geo. 3. c. 53) had previously given Lachlan Macquarie, the Governor of New South Wales, an increased legal authority over New Zealand and murders or manslaughters could be tried in an admiralty court just as if they had been committed at sea. The New South Wales Act 1823 extended the jurisdiction to include lesser crimes committed in New Zealand.

The whole act was repealed by section 39 of the Australian Courts Act 1828 (9 Geo. 4. c. 83), which came into force on 1 March 1829.
