= Australian Constitutions Act 1842 =

1842 United Kingdom of Great Britain and Ireland act of Parliament 5 & 6 Vict. c. 76

- Act of Parliament
- Parliament of the United Kingdom
- Long title: An Act for the Government of New South Wales and Van Diemen's Land.
- Citation: 5 & 6 Vict. c. 76

Dates
- Royal assent: 30 July 1842
Other legislation
Amends	Australian Courts Act 1828

Text of statute as originally enacted

The Australian Constitutions Act 1842 (5 & 6 Vict. c. 76), officially titled "An Act for the Government of New South Wales and Van Diemen's Land", was a milestone piece of Imperial legislation enacted by the Parliament of the United Kingdom on 30 July 1842. The act transformed the political structure of the colony of New South Wales by replacing the purely appointed colonial governance model with Australia's first partially representative legislature. It marked a major transition from direct autocratic rule by colonial governors toward local parliamentary representation and eventual constitutional self-government.

== Background ==
By the late 1830s, the economic and social character of New South Wales had changed significantly due to growing numbers of free settlers, the cessation of convict transportation to the colony in 1840, and the expansion of the pastoral economy. The governance framework established by the Australian Courts Act 1828 (9 Geo. 4. c. 83)—which relied on a small Legislative Council appointed entirely by the Crown—was increasingly viewed by colonists as inadequate and unrepresentative. Settler petitions demanded representation in revenue and taxation matters, leading the British Whig administration to draft legislation granting a limited form of representative parliamentary government.

== Key provisions ==
=== Enlargement and reform of the Legislative Council ===
The act reconstituted the Legislative Council of New South Wales, expanding it to 36 members. For the first time in Australian history, a majority of the legislature—24 members—were elected by eligible colonists, while the remaining 12 members were nominated by the governor or the Crown. To ensure regional representation, the 24 elected seats were distributed across electoral districts, including six members specifically allocated to represent the Port Phillip District (present-day Victoria).

=== Franchise qualifications and civil eligibility ===
Voting rights and political candidature were granted based on property qualifications. To vote, an adult male British subject was required to own freehold property valued at a minimum of £200 or pay annual rent of at least £20. Candidates running for office faced higher thresholds, requiring freehold estate worth £2,000 or an annual income of £100. While these property requirements excluded poorer labourers, ex-convicts who met the wealth criteria were formally eligible to vote, reinforcing civil equality among wealthy free settlers and emancipists.

=== Financial powers and district councils ===
The act granted the enlarged Legislative Council significant power over local taxation and legislative appropriations. However, to safeguard imperial interests, the statute set aside fixed annual sums (a civil list) for the salaries of judges, executive officers, and religious worship, which remained outside the Legislative Council's oversight. The act also introduced a framework for local government by authorizing the creation of elective district councils to manage local roads, infrastructure, and regional taxation, though these bodies met with widespread settler resistance and proved largely ineffective.

== Legacy and constitutional Impact ==
The Australian Constitutions Act 1842 established the principle of representative government in Australia and provided an operational template for subsequent colonial constitutional reform. The inclusion of six representatives for the Port Phillip District gave southern colonists a formal political voice, fuelling the movement that ultimately led to the separation of Victoria under the Australian Constitutions Act 1850 (13 & 14 Vict. c. 59). The 1842 act served as the crucial intermediate link between early penal administration and the fully self-governing bicameral parliaments established across the Australian colonies in the 1850s.

== Bibliography ==
- Castles, Alex (1982). An Australian Legal History. Sydney: Law Book Company. ISBN 978-0-455-19609-1.
- Finn, Paul D. (1987). Law and Government in Colonial Australia. Oxford University Press. ISBN 978-0-19-554746-7.
- Kercher, Bruce (1996). Debt, Seduction and Other Disasters: The Birth of Civil Law in Convict New South Wales. Sydney: Federation Press. ISBN 978-1-86287-200-4.
- Lumb, Richard D. (1991). The Constitution of the Australian States (5th ed.). University of Queensland Press. ISBN 978-0-7022-2218-4.
