= Australian Courts Act 1828 =

1828 United Kingdom of Great Britain and Ireland Act of Parliament 9 Geo. 4 c. 83

Australian Courts Act 1828 (Note: The citation of this act by this short title was authorised by the Short Titles Act 1896 (59 & 60 Vict. c. 14), section 1 and the first schedule. Due to the repeal of those provisions it is now authorised by section 19(2) of the Interpretation Act 1978 (c. 30).)
- Act of Parliament
- Parliament of the United Kingdom
- Long title: An Act to provide for the Administration of Justice in New South Wales and Van Diemen's Land, and for the more effectual Government thereof, and for other Purposes relating thereto.
- Citation: 9 Geo. 4. c. 83

Dates
- Royal assent: 25 July 1828
- Commencement: 1 March 1829
- Expired: 17 July 1837
Other legislation
Repeals/revokes	New South Wales Act 1823
Amended by	New South Wales, etc., Government Act 1837; Administration of Justice, New South Wales, etc. Act 1838; New South Wales and Van Diemen's Land Act 1839; New South Wales and Van Diemen's Land Act 1840; Australian Constitutions Act 1842; Australia Act 1986

Text of statute as originally enacted

New South Wales, etc., Government Act 1837
- Act of Parliament
- Parliament of the United Kingdom
- Long title: An Act to continue until the Thirty-first Day of December One thousand eight hundred and thirty-eight, and from thence to the End of the then next Session of Parliament, an Act of the Ninth Year of His Majesty King George the Fourth, for the Administration of Justice in New South Wales and Van Dieman's Land.
- Citation: 7 Will. 4 & 1 Vict. c. 42

Dates
- Royal assent: 12 July 1837
Other legislation
Amends	Australian Courts Act 1828
Repealed by	Statute Law Revision Act 1874

Status: Repealed

Text of statute as originally enacted

Administration of Justice, New South Wales, etc. Act 1838
- Act of Parliament
- Parliament of the United Kingdom
- Long title: An Act to continue until the Thirty-first Day of December One thousand eight hundred and thirty-nine, and from thence to the End of the then next Session of Parliament, an Act of the Ninth Year of His Majesty King George the Fourth, for the Administration of Justice in New South Wales and Van Diemens Land.
- Citation: 1 & 2 Vict. c. 50

Dates
- Royal assent: 27 July 1838
Other legislation
Amended by	Australian Courts Act 1828
Repealed by	Statute Law Revision Act 1874 (No. 2)

Status: Repealed

Text of statute as originally enacted

New South Wales and Van Diemen's Land Act 1839
- Act of Parliament
- Parliament of the United Kingdom
- Long title: An Act to amend an Act of the Ninth Year of King George the Fourth, to provide for the Administration of Justice in New South Wales and Van Diemen's Land, and for the more effectual Government thereof, and for other Purposes relating thereto; and to continue the same until the Thirty-first Day of December One thousand eight hundred and forty, and thenceforward to the End of the then next Session of Pariiament.
- Citation: 2 & 3 Vict. c. 70

Dates
- Royal assent: 24 August 1839
Other legislation
Repealed by	Statute Law Revision Act 1875

Status: Repealed

Text of statute as originally enacted

New South Wales and Van Diemen's Land Act 1840
- Act of Parliament
- Parliament of the United Kingdom
- Long title: An Act to continue until the Thirty-first Day of December One thousand eight hundred and forty-one, and to the End of the then next Session of Parliament, and to extend, the Provisions of an Act to provide for the Administration of Justice in New South Wales and Van Diemen's Land, and for the more effectual Government thereof, and for other Purposes relating thereto.
- Citation: 3 & 4 Vict. c. 62

Dates
- Royal assent: 7 August 1840
Other legislation
Repealed by	Statute Law Revision Act 1891

Status: Repealed

Text of statute as originally enacted

The Australian Courts Act 1828 (9 Geo. 4. c. 83) was an act of the Parliament of the United Kingdom that reformed the administration of justice and government in the colonies of New South Wales and Van Diemen's Land (modern-day Tasmania). Passed on 25 July 1828, the legislation established a formal date of reception for English law, expanded local colonial legislative councils, and reorganized judicial proceedings. It played a pivotal role in the constitutional transition of the Australian penal colonies into self-governing territories under the rule of law.

== Background ==
Prior to 1828, legal and judicial administration in New South Wales operated under the New South Wales Act 1823 (4 Geo. 4. c. 96), which established the first supreme courts and legislative councils. However, the 1823 act was temporary in nature and contained ambiguities regarding the extent to which English statute law applied to colonial matters. Following reports by Commissioner John Bigge and growing agitation from free settlers for rights similar to those in the United Kingdom, Parliament enacted the Australian Courts Act 1828 to establish more permanent statutory foundations for administration and justice.

== Key provisions ==
=== Reception of English Law ===
The most enduring provision of the act was section 24, which declared that all laws and statutes in force within the realm of England on 25 July 1828 were applicable in the courts of New South Wales and Van Diemen's Land, so far as they could be reasonably applied. This fixed date established a clear baseline for legal administration, resolving uncertainty over whether subsequent British statutory reforms automatically applied to the colonies without explicit statutory inclusion.

Provided also, and be it further enacted, That all Laws and Statutes in force within the Realm of England at the Time of the passing of this Act, (not being inconsistent herewith, or with any Charter or Letters Patent or Order in Council which may be issued in pursuance hereof,) shall be applied in the Administration of Justice in the Courts of New South Wales and Van Diemen’s Land respectively, so far as the same can be applied within the said Colonies; and as often as any Doubt shall arise as to the Application of any such Laws or Statutes in the said Colonies respectively, it shall be lawful for the Governors of the said Colonies respectively, by and with the Advice of the Legislative Councils of the said Colonies respectively, by Ordinances to be by them for that Purpose made, to declare whether such Laws or Statutes shall be deemed to extend to such Colonies, and to be in force within the same, or to make and establish such Limitations and Modifications of any such Laws and Statutes within the said Colonies respectively as may be deemed expedient in that Behalf: Provided always, that in the meantime and before any such Ordinances shall be actually made, it shall be the Duty of the said Supreme Courts, as often as any such Doubts shall arise upon the Trial of any Information or Action, or upon any other Proceeding before them, to adjudge and decide as to the Application of ay such Laws or Statutes in the said Colonies respectively. — Section 24, Australian Courts Act 1828 (9 Geo. 4. c. 83)

=== Governance and legislative reform ===
The act expanded the legislative councils of both colonies from small advisory groups into bodies comprising 10 to 15 members appointed by the Crown. While the colonial governors retained the sole power to initiate legislation, the expanded councils gained enhanced authority to review, amend, and reject proposed laws, marking a key structural progression toward representative colonial government.

=== Judicial administration and trial by jury ===
The act authorized the supreme courts of New South Wales and Van Diemen's Land to exercise broad criminal and civil jurisdictions comparable to the English courts of King's Bench, Common Pleas, and Exchequer. Although military panels of seven officers were largely retained for criminal trials, judges in civil actions were granted discretion to order trial by a jury of twelve citizens upon application by either party, representing an incremental step toward full civil jury trials in Australia.

=== Legacy and constitutional impact ===
The Australian Courts Act 1828 served as the legal bedrock for the legal systems of New South Wales, Tasmania, Queensland, and Victoria (the latter two having later separated from New South Wales). The sections relating to the legislative councils were superseded by and repealed by the Australian Constitutions Act 1842 (5 & 6 Vict. c. 76).

The principle of reception enshrined in section 24 ensured that the English common law and pre-1828 Imperial statutes formed the primary foundation of Australian jurisprudence. The act remained central to colonial legal identity until subsequent constitutional evolutions, culminating in the passage of the Australia Act 1986, which severed remaining Imperial legislative links.

=== Temporary nature ===
The act was originally passed as a temporary measure. Its original expiry was extended four times:

- New South Wales, etc., Government Act 1837 (7 Will. 4 & 1 Vict. c. 42)
- Administration of Justice, New South Wales, etc. Act 1838 (1 & 2 Vict. c. 50)
- New South Wales and Van Diemen's Land Act 1839 (2 & 3 Vict. c. 70)
- New South Wales and Van Diemen's Land Act 1840 (3 & 4 Vict. c. 62)

Section 53 of the Australian Constitutions Act 1842 (5 & 6 Vict. c. 76) made the remaining provisions of the act permanent.

==== New South Wales and Van Diemen's Land Act 1839 ====
The New South Wales and Van Diemen's Land Act 1839 (2 & 3 Vict. c. 70) empowered the legislative councils of the colonies to make provision for the administration of justice and the structure of jury trials. This delegated authority allowed local colonial authorities to adapt court procedures to regional needs while Imperial officials finalized broader constitutional overhauls.

==== New South Wales and Van Diemen's Land Act 1840 ====
The New South Wales and Van Diemen's Land Act 1840 (3 & 4 Vict. c. 62) contained significant structural provisions authorizing the Crown to erect any part of the vast territory of New South Wales into separate colonies. This statutory power directly facilitated the formal separation of New Zealand from New South Wales as an independent Crown colony in 1841 and established the legal precedent for the later separation of Victoria and Queensland. The act is therefore the act sometimes known as the Government of New Zealand Act 1840.

== Bibliography ==
- Australian Courts Act 1828
- Camilleri, Marg; Harkness, Alistair (eds.). "Context and Controversies of Australian Courts". Australian Courts: Controversies, Challenges and Change. Palgrave Macmillan. p. 4. ISBN 978-3-031-19062-9.
- Castles, Alex (1982). An Australian Legal History. Sydney: Law Book Company. ISBN 978-0-455-19609-1.
- Kercher, Bruce (1996). Debt, Seduction and Other Disasters: The Birth of Civil Law in Convict New South Wales. Sydney: Federation Press. ISBN 978-1-86287-200-4.
- Lumb, Richard D. (1991). The Constitution of the Australian States (5th ed.). University of Queensland Press. ISBN 978-0-7022-2218-4.
