= Disallowance and reservation =

Constitutional concept

Disallowance and reservation are historical constitutional powers that were instituted in several territories throughout the British Empire as a mechanism to delay or overrule legislation. Originally created to preserve the Crown's authority over colonial governments, these powers are now generally considered politically obsolete, and in many cases have been formally abolished.

== General principles ==
In British Commonwealth and colonial territories, the legislature is typically composed of one or two legislative chambers, together with the governor-general (or colonial governor) acting in the name of the sovereign. Once a bill has passed through the chambers, it is presented to the governor-general for assent on the Sovereign's behalf. The governor-general was formally instructed (or required by the constitution or by statute) in certain circumstances to reserve a bill for the sovereign's "pleasure". That is, the governor-general would neither assent nor refuse assent to the bill, but would instead refer it to the secretary of state for the colonies in the United Kingdom for consideration by the British government; assent, if then given, would be by the King- (or Queen-) in-Council.

A bill assented to by a governor-general or colonial governor would pass into law, but might still be disallowed by the King- or Queen-in-Council, usually within a certain timeframe after its passage. Once notice of the disallowance was communicated to the colonial authorities, the act in question would cease to operate as law. Disallowance was not retroactive, so anything validly done under an act's terms before its disallowance remained legal.

Sometimes a bill that had passed into law might be suspended by its own terms until the sovereign's pleasure was made known, i.e. until the British government had advised the colonial authorities whether they were prepared to accept the legislation. Approval, if given, would again be by the King- or Queen-in-Council.

All three methods were originally used to ensure that legislation was not repugnant to English law, that it did not exceed a legislature's formal competence, that it did not interfere with the British government's imperial or foreign policies, and even simply that the British government did not disagree with the legislation.

The use of these powers declined over the course of the nineteenth century, in particular because of the abolition of the doctrine of general repugnancy by the Colonial Laws Validity Act 1865 and because the British government began to leave it to the court system to rule on the vires of colonial legislation. With the development of responsible government, the use of these powers declined even more rapidly. The 1926 imperial conference approved a committee report that stated:

[A]part from provisions embodied in constitutions or in specific statutes expressly providing for reservation, it is recognised that it is the right of the Government of each Dominion to advise the Crown in all matters relating to its own affairs. Consequently, it would not be in accordance with constitutional practice for advice to be tendered to His Majesty by His Majesty's Government in Great Britain in any matter appertaining to the affairs of a Dominion against the views of the Government of that Dominion.

The Report of the Conference on the Operation of Dominion Legislation and Merchant Shipping Legislation, 1929 (Cmd 3479), which was approved by the 1930 imperial conference, stated that both the prerogative and statutory powers of disallowance had "not been exercised for many years" in relation to dominion legislation (para. 19), and more specifically:

In fact the power of disallowance has not been exercised in relation to Canadian legislation since 1873 or to New Zealand legislation since 1867; it has never been exercised in relation to legislation passed by the Parliaments of the Commonwealth of Australia or the Union of South Africa. (para. 22)

Together with the change from the appointment of governors-general being made on the formal advice of the British government to being made on the advice of the relevant dominion government, the effect of these two conferences was to put an end to the use of both reservation and disallowance as meaningful powers. Later Commonwealth realms, given independence in the 1950s onwards, simply did not include reservation and disallowance in their constitutions in the first place.

== In Australia ==
The powers of disallowance and reservation still exist at the federal level in Australia, and are described in sections 58 to 60 of the Australian Constitution. Section 58 gives the governor-general an additional power, that of returning a bill to Parliament with suggested amendments. Section 74 provided that laws containing limitations on appeal to the Privy Council had to be reserved for the sovereign's assent. Once the governor-general has assented to a law, the sovereign has one year in which to disallow it. If the governor-general reserves a bill for the sovereign's assent, the bill will die unless the sovereign approves it within two years of its passage. However, the power of disallowance has never been used in relation to Australian federal legislation, and reservation has likewise been rare.

When a proposed law passed by both Houses of the Parliament is presented to the Governor-General for the Queen's assent, he shall declare, according to his discretion, but subject to this Constitution, that he assents in the Queen's name, or that he withholds assent, or that he reserves the law for the Queen's pleasure. — Section 58, Constitution of Australia

The Queen may disallow any law within one year from the Governor-General's assent, and such disallowance on being made known by the Governor-General by speech or message to each of the Houses of the Parliament, or by Proclamation, shall annul the law from the day when the disallowance is so made known. — Section 59, Constitution of Australia

The Parliament may make laws limiting the matters in which such leave [to appeal from the High Court to the Privy Council] may be asked, but proposed laws containing any such limitation shall be reserved by the Governor-General for Her Majesty's pleasure. — Section 74, Constitution of Australia

=== Australian state legislatures ===
There were similar arrangements in the Australian states, whose constitutional arrangements predated Australian federation by decades. After federation they were clarified by the Australian States Constitution Act 1907 (7 Edw. 7 c. 7).

Earlier requirements for reservation of colonial acts were contained in the following Imperial acts:

- Australian Constitutions Act 1842 (5 & 6 Vict. c. 76)
  Reservation in New South Wales:
  And be it enacted, That every Bill which has been passed by the said Council, and, also every Law proposed by the Governor which shall have been passed by the said Council, whether with or without Amendments, shall be presented for Her Majesty's Assent to the Governor of the said Colony, and that the Governor shall declare according to his Discretion, but subject nevertheless to the Provisions contained in this Act, and to such Instructions as may from Time to Time be given in that Behalf by Her Majesty, Her Heirs or Successors, that he assents to such Bill in Her Majesty's Name, or that he withholds Her Majesty's Assent, or that he reserves such Bill for the Signification of Her Majesty's Pleasure thereon; and all Bills altering or affecting the Divisions and Extent of the several Districts and Towns which shall be represented in the Legislative Council, or establishing new and other Divisions of the same, or altering the Number of the Members of the Council to be chosen by the said Districts and Towns respectively, or increasing the whole Number of the Legislative Council, or altering the Salaries of the Governor, Superintendent, or Judges, or any of them, and also all Bills altering or affecting the Duties of Customs upon any Goods, Wares or Merchandize imported to or exported from the said Colony, shall in every Case be so reserved, except such Bills for temporary Laws as the Governor shall expressly declare necessary to be forthwith assented to by reason of some public and pressing Emergency. — Section 31, Australian Constitutions Act 1842 (5 & 6 Vict. c. 76)
  Disallowance in New South Wales:
  And be it enacted, That whenever any Bill which shall have been presented for Her Majesty's Assent to the Governor of the said Colony shall by such Governor have been assented to in Her Majesty's Name, the Governor shall by the first convenient Opportunity transmit to One of Her Majesty's Principal Secretaries of State an authentic Copy of such Bill so assented to; and that it shall be lawful, at any Time within Two Years after such Bill shall have been so received by the Secretary of State, for Her Majesty, by Order in Council, to declare Her Disallowance of such Bill; and that such Disallowance, together with a Certificate under the Hand and Seal of the Secretary of State, certifying the Day on which such Bill was received as aforesaid, being signified by the Governor to the Legislative Council of the said Colony, by Speech or Message to the said Council, or by Proclamation in the New South Wales Government Gazette, shall make void and annul the same from and after the Day of such Signification. — Section 32, Australian Constitutions Act 1842 (5 & 6 Vict. c. 76)
- Australian Constitutions Act 1844 (7 & 8 Vict. c. 74)
  Governor can decline assent, or be instructed to directly give assent on bills that would normally require reservation:
  And whereas by the said recited Act (Note: Australian Constitutions Act 1842 (5 & 6 Vict. c. 76)) it is provided, that certain Bills shall in every Case be reserved by the Governor for the Signification of Her Majesty's Pleasure thereon, and the Intent of such Provision was to ensure that such Bills as aforesaid should not be assented to by the Governor without due Consideration; be it enacted, That it shall not be necessary for the Governor to reserve any such Bill for the Signification of Her Majesty's Pleasure thereon from which in the Exercise of his Discretion, as limited in the said recited Act, he shall declare that he withholds Her Majesty's Assent, or to which he shall have previously received Instructions on the Part of Her Majesty to assent, and to which he shall assent accordingly. — Section 7, Australian Constitutions Act 1844 (7 & 8 Vict. c. 74)
- Australian Constitutions Act 1850 (13 & 14 Vict. c. 59)
  Reservation and disallowance are extended to South Australia, Tasmania and Victoria. (Note: Western Australia's legislative council was not established under this act.) Also required that any bills altering the constitutions of a colonial legislative council were tabled in the Imperial Parliament for 30 days as part of the process.
  And be it enacted, That [...] all the Provisions of the said firstly-recited Act of the Sixth Year of the Reign of Her Majesty, as explained and amended by the said secondly-recited Act of the Eighth Year of Her Majesty, (Note: Australian Constitutions Act 1844 (7 & 8 Vict. c. 74)) concerning [...] the giving and withholding of Her Majesty’s Assent to Bills, and the Reservation of Bills for the Signification of Her Majesty’s Pleasure thereon, and the Bills so reserved; the Instructions to be conveyed to the Governor for his Guidance in relation to the Matters aforesaid; and the Disallowance of Bills by Her Majesty, shall apply to and be in force in the Colony of Victoria, and in each of the said Colonics of Van Diemen's Land, South Australia, and Western Australia, in which a Legislative Council shall be established under this Act, as if all such Provisions were here repeated, the Name of such respective Colony being substituted for the Name of the Colony of New South Wales. — Section 12, Australian Constitutions Act 1850 (13 & 14 Vict. c. 59)
- New South Wales Constitution Act 1855 (18 & 19 Vict. c. 54)
  This is the same wording used in section 3 of the Victoria Constitution Act 1855, applying reservation and disallowance to the new Parliament of New South Wales.
- Victoria Constitution Act 1855 (18 & 19 Vict. c. 55)
  Reservation and disallowance are applied to the new Parliament of Victoria:
  The Provisions of the said Act of the Fourteenth Year of Her Majesty, Chapter Fifty-nine, (Note: Australian Constitutions Act 1850 (13 & 14 Vict. c. 59)) and of the Act of the Fifth and Sixth Years of Her Majesty, Chapter Seventy-six, "for the Government of New South Wales and Van Diemen's Land," which relate to the giving and withholding of Her Majesty’s Assent to Bills, and the Reservation of Bills for the Signification of Her Majesty's Pleasure thereon, and the Instructions to be conveyed to Governors for their Guidance in relation to the Matters aforesaid, and the Disallowance of Bills by Her Majesty, shall apply to Bills to be passed by the Legislative Council and Assembly constituted under the said reserved Bill and this Act, and by any other Legislative Body or Bodies which may at any Time hereafter be substituted for the present Legislative Council and Assembly. — Victoria Constitution Act 1855 (18 & 19 Vict. c. 55)
- Australian Constitutions Act 1862 (25 & 26 Vict. c. 11)
  Retrospectively approved colonial acts that had required reservation, where this had not been correctly done at the time they were proclaimed.
- Western Australia Constitution Act 1890 (53 & 54 Vict. c. 26)
  Reservation and disallowance are applied to the new Parliament of Western Australia:
  The provisions of the Acts of the session held in the thirteenth and fourteenth years of Her Majesty, chapter fifty-nine, and of the session held in the fifth and sixth years of Her Majesty, chapter seventy-six (being two of the Acts mentioned in the said schedule), which relate to the giving or withholding of Her Majesty's assent to Bills, and the reservation of Bills for the signification of Her Majesty's pleasure thereon, and the instructions to be conveyed to Governors for their guidance in relation to the matters aforesaid, and the disallowance of Bills by Her Majesty, shall apply to Bills to be passed by the Legislative Council and Assembly constituted under the scheduled Bill and this Act, and by any other legislative body or bodies which may at any time hereafter be substituted for the said Legislative Council and Assembly. — Section 2(a) of the Western Australia Constitution Act 1890 (53 & 54 Vict. c. 26)

Unlike in Canada (see below), disallowance of state laws, and reservation by state governors, remained matters for the Imperial government – the Australian federal government was never given the power to block state laws. Use of disallowance and reservation in the states declined and eventually ceased, and both powers were formally abolished by the Australia Act 1986.

==== Acts that were disallowed ====
Victoria

- An Act to provide for the better regulation and discipline of Armed Vessels in the service of Her Majesty's Local Government in Victoria. (1860) (23 Vict. No. 95)

==== Acts that were reserved ====
Victoria
- An Act for the enforcement of Claims against the Crown. (1858) (21 Vict. No. 49)
- An Act to shorten the duration of the Legislative Assembly. (1859) (22 Vict. No. 89)
- Australian Trust Company Act 1859 (22 Vict. No. 90)
- An Act to limit the number of persons holding offices under the Crown who may sit and vote in the Legislative Council and Assembly of Victoria. (1859) (22 Vict. No. 91)
- An Act to amend the Law relating to Aliens. (1863) (26 Vict. No. 166)
- An Act to repeal the appropriation of the Sum provided for the payment of the Salaries of the Governor's Staff and of the Governor's Travelling and other Expenses. (1864) (27 Vict. No. 189)
- An Act to allay doubts as to the validity of "The Real Property Act." (1864) (27 Vict. No. 210)
- Statute of Trusts 1864 (28 Vict. No. 234)
- An Act to amend the Law relating to the Pensions of Responsible Officers. (1865) (28 Vict. No. 235)
- Marriage and Matrimonial Causes Statute 1864 (28 Vict. No. 268)
- State Aid to Religion Abolition Act 1871 (34 Vict. No. 391)
- An Act to Amend "The Discipline Act 1870." (1872) (35 Vict. No. 417)
- An Act to make valid the Marriage of a Man with the Sister of his Deceased Wife. (1873) (36 Vict. No. 453)
- An Act to amend an Act intituled "An Act to enable the Bishops Clergy and Laity of the United Church of England and Ireland in Victoria to provide for the regulation of the affairs of the said Church." (1873) (36 Vict. No. 454)
- Legislative Council Act 1881 (45 Vict. No. 702)
- Legislative Council Elections for 1882 Validating Act 1882 (46 Vict. No. 745)
- Marriage and Matrimonial Causes Statute Amendment Act 1883 (47 Vict. No. 787)
- Marine Board Act 1887 (52 Vict. No. 965)
- Divorce Act 1889 (53 Vict. No. 1056)
- Banks and Currency Act 1890 (54 Vict. No. 1164)
- Marine Act 1890 (54 Vict. No. 1165)
- Marriage Act 1890 (54 Vict. No. 1166)
- Mint Act 1890 (54 Vict. No. 1167)
- Marriage Act 1890 (No. 2) (54 Vict. No. 1204)
- Ministers' Members' and Officers' Salaries and Reimbursement Retrenchment Act 1892 (56 Vict. No. 1308)
- Marine Act 1892 (57 Vict. No. 1357)
- Ministers' Salaries Retrenchment Act 1893 (58 Vict. No. 1358)
- Special and other Appropriations Retrenchment Act 1893 (58 Vict. No. 1359)
- Marine Act 1893 (No. 2) (58 Vict. No. 1360)
- Governor's Salary Reduction Act 1895 (59 Vict. No. 1393)
- Ministers' Salaries Act 1895 (59 Vict. No. 1394)
- Special and Other Appropriations Retrenchment Limitation Act 1896 (61 Vict. No. 1485)
- Marine Act 1897 (62 Vict. No. 1557)
- Constitution Act Amendment Act 1900 (1 Edw. VII. No. 1723)
- Governor's Salary Further Reduction Act 1900 (1 Edw. VII. No. 1725)
- Ministers and Special and Other Appropriations Retrenchment Act 1903 (3 Edw. VII. No. 1849)
- Constitution Act 1903 (3 Edw. VII. No. 1864)
- Constitution Act 1906 (6 Edw. VII. No. 2075)
- Adult Suffrage Act 1908 (9 Edw. VII. No. 2185)
- Officials in Parliament Act 1914 (5 Geo. V. No. 2578)
- Governor's Deputy's Powers Act 1917 (8 Geo. V. No. 2898)
- Marriage (Validating) Act 1919 (9 Geo. V. No. 2998)
- Imperial Acts Application Act 1922 (13 Geo. V. No. 3270)
- Constitution (Reform) Act 1937 (No. 4533)
- Commonwealth Powers Act 1943 (No. 4950)
- Governor's Salary Act 1949 (No. 5380)
- Governor's Salary Act 1956 (No. 6056)
- Governor's Salary Act 1964 (No. 7106)
- Constitution Act Amendment (Governor's Salary) Act 1968 (No. 7656)
- Constitution Act 1975 (No. 8750)
- Constitution (Governor's Pension) Act 1978 (No. 9251)
- Constitution Act 1981 (No. 9721)
- Historic Shipwrecks Act 1981 (No. 9722)
- Constitution (Governor's Salary) Act 1982 (No. 9773)

== In Canada ==
In Canadian constitutional law, the powers of reservation and disallowance of federal legislation still formally remain in place in Sections 55 and 56 of the Constitution Act, 1867. These are extended to provincial legislation by Section 90. In initial intent, and in practice for the first few years of Confederation, disallowance was considered a means of ensuring constitutional compliance.

For federal bills, reservation was done on the instructions of the United Kingdom until 1878. At the 1930 Imperial Conference, it was agreed that the United Kingdom would not reserve or disallow legislation without the approval of the Canadian cabinet. Between 1867 and 1878, twenty-one federal bills were reserved, six of which were denied royal assent. The only disallowed federal bill was the Oaths Act in 1873, which sought to enable Parliament to call witnesses for examination regarding the Pacific Scandal; the bill was deemed to be outside the power of the Federal parliament as envisioned in the British North America Act.

Reservation and disallowance are made applicable to the provincial bills in Section 90 of the Constitution Act, 1867, with the substitution of the Governor General of Canada for the Queen-in-Council and the lieutenant governor for the governor general. Prime Minister John A. Macdonald and his Conservative successors regularly advised disallowance for provincial legislation, generally citing respect for private contracts, preservation of federal jurisdiction, and the rights of local minorities as justification. Macdonald disallowed 13 railway charters issued by the fledgling provincial government of Manitoba. The election of the Liberals under Wilfrid Laurier in 1896, who regarded both reservation and disallowance as unwarranted interference in provincial affairs, began to see the use of the powers subside. Provincial governments had gained democratic legitimacy and disputes regarding division of powers were decided via judicial review, leaving Liberals such as Oliver Mowat to believe the only motive for using the power was political interference. By 1911 the practice of disallowing provincial bills had become very infrequent. A notable use of disallowance in the 20th century was its use by federal Justice Minister Ernest Lapointe in the 1930s and 1940s to strike down various laws of Alberta's Social Credit government, which tried to legislate in the clearly defined federal powers of banking and currency.

The last disallowance of a provincial law occurred in April 1943, in relation to Alberta legislation restricting land sales regarding Hutterites and "enemy aliens." The last reservation of a provincial law occurred in 1961, when Saskatchewan Lieutenant Governor Frank Lindsay Bastedo, without the instruction or knowledge of the federal government, reserved a CCF government's bill regarding mining contracts. The Diefenbaker Cabinet quickly passed an order-in-council to grant royal assent.

Both powers, while still operative, are generally considered dormant, prompting some debates about whether they have effectively become obsolete through disuse. Comparative public law scholar Richard Albert has argued that both powers have fallen into "constitutional desuetude," which occurs "when an entrenched constitutional provision loses its binding force upon political actors as a result of its conscious sustained nonuse and public repudiation by preceding and present political actors."

Removal of both powers from the constitution was contemplated in the failed Victoria Charter. The first ministers decided not to include abolition in the Constitution Act, 1982, and attempts to revise the powers included in the Charlottetown Accord failed at referendum.

=== Consideration of disallowance and reservation after 1961 ===
The government of Pierre Trudeau faced public pressure to disallow Quebec's Charter of the French Language in 1977, which forbade the use of English language signs and openly contravened some procedural linguistic rights protected by the British North America Act. Trudeau, a constitutional scholar, demurred, believing that disallowance would ultimately cause more political harm, and that it was better to have the conflicting matters adjudicated. Trudeau believed that disallowance was warranted only for laws that clearly violated federal power or that created disorder beyond the boundaries of the province enacting the law.

In 2018, the government of Justin Trudeau was formally asked by Toronto City Council to disallow Ontario's pending Efficient Local Government Act (Bill 31), a bill intended to force the reduction of the number of wards represented in the Toronto City Council after the government's previous attempt to do so was ruled unconstitutional by the Superior Court of Justice. Trudeau said he did not intend to intervene in the matter. The Legislative Assembly dropped Bill 31 when the Ontario Court of Appeal overturned the initial ruling of the Superior Court.

In 2019, the Alberta Leader of the Opposition wrote an open letter to the Lieutenant Governor of Alberta asking her to reserve royal assent on the Reform of Agencies, Boards and Commissions and Government Enterprises Act, 2019. The Lieutenant Governor declined.

== In New Zealand ==
Disallowance and reservation were powers granted to the imperial government and the governor respectively in the New Zealand Constitution Act 1852. They were at first used relatively frequently, but as in other self-governing colonies the practice of overruling local legislation soon stopped. Both powers were formally abolished in 1973.

== See also ==
- Legislatively-referred referendum and abrogative referendum, powers analogous to reservation and disallowance in a constitutional theory based on popular sovereignty, rather than sovereignty of the Crown.
- Canadian federalism
- Manitoba Schools Question
- New Zealand Constitution Act 1852 § Effect
