= List of acts of the Parliament of Victoria from 1884 =

This is a list of acts of the Parliament of Victoria, Australia for the year 1884.

== 1884 ==
Continuing the second session of the twelfth parliament of Victoria.

Short title, or popular name	Citation	Royal assent
Long title
Marriage and Matrimonial Causes Statute Amendment Act 1883 (Note: Although passed in the year 1883, and given a short title ending '...Act 1883', the need to obtain approval for this act from the United Kingdom meant it was not proclaimed until the year 1884.) (repealed)	47 Vict. No. 787	7 May 1884 (Note: This act was reserved for approval by Her Majesty.)
An Act to amend the laws relating to Children and Wives and to Divorce and Matrimonial Causes. (Repealed by Marriage Act 1890 (54 Vict. No. 1156))

The third session of the twelfth parliament of Victoria.

Short title, or popular name	Citation	Royal assent
Long title
Melbourne Tramways Trust Act 1884	48 Vict. No. 788	21 July 1884
An Act io facilitate the Borrowing of Money by the Melbourne Tramways Trust for the Construction of Tramways.
	48 Vict. No. 789	21 July 1884
An Act to apply out of the Consolidated Revenue the sum of One million and fifty-four thousand and ninety-five pounds to the service of the year One thousand eight hundred and eighty-four and five.
	48 Vict. No. 790	1 September 1884
An Act to apply out of "The Railway Loan Account 1881" and "The Victorian Loan and Debenture Redemption Account 1883" certain sums of money for Permanent-way Material, Rolling Stock, and other works.
Duties of Customs Act 1884 (repealed)	48 Vict. No. 791	24 September 1884
An Act for granting to Her Majesty certain Duties of Customs in lieu of certain other Duties. (Repealed by Customs and Excise Duties Act 1890 (54 Vict. No. 1082))
Distillation Amending Act 1884 (repealed)	48 Vict. No. 792	24 September 1884
An Act for granting to Her Majesty certain Duties of Excise in lieu of certain other Duties. (Repealed by Customs and Excise Duties Act 1890 (54 Vict. No. 1082))
	48 Vict. No. 793	25 September 1884
An Act to apply out of the Consolidated Revenue the sum of One million two hundred and forty-two thousand and forty-four pounds to the service of the year One thousand eight hundred and eighty-four and five.
Zoological and Acclimatisation Society Incorporation Act 1884	48 Vict. No. 794	12 November 1884
An Act to provide for the Incorporation and Government of the Zoological and Acclimatisation Society of Victoria and for other purposes.
	48 Vict. No. 795	12 November 1884
An Act to amend "The Mallee Pastoral Leases Act 1883." (Note: Mallee Pastoral Leases Act 1883 (47 Vict. No. 766))
Mining on Private Property Act 1884 (repealed)	48 Vict. No. 796	25 November 1884
An Act to provide for Mining for Gold and Silver on Private Property. (Repealed by Mines Act 1890 (54 Vict. No. 1120))
Anglican Trusts Corporations Act 1884	48 Vict. No. 797	25 November 1884
An Act to provide for the creation of corporate bodies of Trustees in which property belonging to the Church of England in Victoria may be vested and to make further provisions in reference thereto.
	48 Vict. No. 798	25 November 1884
An Act to authorize a payment out of the Assurance Fund under the "Transfer of Land Statute." (Note: Transfer of Land Statute 1866 (29 Vict. No. 301))
	48 Vict. No. 799	25 November 1884
An Act to remove doubts as to the power of the Governor in Council in certain cases. (Repealed by Constitution Act Amendment Act 1890 (54 Vict. No. 1075))
	48 Vict. No. 800	25 November 1884
An Act to further amend "The Passengers Harbors and Navigation Statute 1865." (Note: Passengers Harbors and Navigation Statute 1865 (28 Vict. No. 255)) (Repealed by Marine Board Act 1887 (52 Vict. No. 965))
Residence Areas Act 1884 (repealed)	48 Vict. No. 801	4 December 1884
An Act to amend "The Residence Areas Act 1881." (Note: Residence Areas Act 1881 (45 Vict. No. 709)) (Repealed by Mines Act 1890 (54 Vict. No. 1120))
Attorneys and Solicitors Remuneration Act 1884 (repealed)	48 Vict. No. 802	4 December 188
An Act to provide for the Remuneration of Attorneys and Solicitors. (Repealed by Supreme Court Act 1890 (54 Vict. No. 1142))
	48 Vict. No. 803	4 December 1884
An Act to amend "The Licensing Act 1876." (Note: Licensing Act 1876 (40 Vict. No. 566))
Amending Companies Statute 1884 (repealed)	48 Vict. No. 804	12 December 1884
An Act to further amend "The Companies Statute 1864." (Note: Companies Statute 1864 (27 Vict. No. 190)) (Repealed by Companies Act 1890 (54 Vict. No. 1074))
Victorian Debentures Redemption and Loan Act 1884	48 Vict. No. 805	12 December 1884
An Act to authorize the Raising of Money for the Redemption or Payment of certain Debentures and for other purposes.
Waterworks Act 1884 (repealed)	48 Vict. No. 806	12 December 1884
An Act to amend "The Waterworks Act 1880," (Note: Waterworks Act 1880 (44 Vict. No. 656)) and for other purposes. (Repealed by Water Act 1890 (54 Vict. No. 1156))
Agent-General's Act 1884 (repealed)	48 Vict. No. 807	12 December 1884
An Act to amend an Act intituled "An Act to make better provision for the Office of Agent-General." (Note: Agent-General's Act 1872 (36 Vict. No. 441)) (Repealed by Agent-General's Act 1890 (54 Vict. No. 1061))
Patents Act 1884 (repealed)	48 Vict. No. 808	12 December 1884
An Act to amend the Laws concerning Letters Patent for Inventions. (Repealed by Patents Act 1889 (53 Vict. No. 1034))
Dog Act 1884 (repealed)	48 Vict. No. 809	12 December 1884
An Act to abate the nuisance relating to Dogs. (Repealed by Dog Act 1890 (54 Vict. No. 1084))
Amendment of Informalities Act 1884	48 Vict. No. 810	12 December 1884
An Act to make provision for the amendment of Errors and Informalities in proceedings before Justices of the Peace.
	48 Vict. No. 811	12 December 1884
An Act to amend the "Statute of Trusts 1864." (Note: Statute of Trusts 1864 (28 Vict. No. 234)) (Repealed by Trusts Act 1890 (54 Vict. No. 1150))
Land Act 1884 (repealed)	48 Vict. No. 812	12 December 1884
An Act to amend and consolidate the laws relating to the Sale and Occupation of Crown Lands, and for other purposes. (Repealed by Land Act 1890 (54 Vict. No. 1106))
Rabbit Suppression Act 1884	48 Vict. No. 813	12 December 1884
An Act to amend and continue the Laws relating to the Suppression of Rabbits.
Volunteer (Cadet) Act 1884 (repealed)	48 Vict. No. 814	12 December 1884
An Act to amend "The Volunteer Statute 1865" (Note: Volunteer Statute 1865 (28 Vict. No. 266)) and for other purposes. (Repealed by Defences and Discipline Act 1890 (54 Vict. No. 1083))
Melbourne Tramway and Omnibus Company's Additional Branches and Amendment Act 1884	48 Vict. No. 815	12 December 1884
An Act to authorize the Melbourne Tramway and Omnibus Company Limited to construct Tramway Branches in the Cities of Melbourne and Collingwood and in the Borough of St. Kilda and to amend "The Melbourne Tramway and Omnibus Company's Act 1883" (Note: Melbourne Tramway and Omnibus Company's Act 1883 (47 Vict. No. 765)) and for other purposes.
Hospitals and Charitable Institutions Amending Act 1884 (repealed)	48 Vict. No. 816	12 December 1884
An Act to amend an Act intituled "An Act for Hospitals and Charitable Institutions" (Note: Hospitals and Charitable Institutions Act 1864 (27 Vict. No. 220)) and for other purposes. (Repealed by Hospitals and Charities Act 1890 (54 Vict. No. 1099))
Expiring Laws Continuance Act 1884	48 Vict. No. 817	12 December 1884
An Act to continue various Expiring Laws.
Rosstown Junction Railway Amendment Act 1884 (repealed)	48 Vict. No. 818	12 December 1884
An Act to amend the Rosstown Junction Railway Act No. DCXIV. (Note: Rosstown Junction Railway Act 1878 (42 Vict. No. 614)) and for other purposes. (Repealed by Rosstown Junction Railway Abandonment Act 1916 (7 Geo. V. No. 2880))
Tramways Act 1884 (repealed)	48 Vict. No. 819	12 December 1884
An Act to provide for the construction of Tramway Lines with the consent of the municipal authorities. (Repealed by Tramways Act 1890 (54 Vict. No. 1148))
	48 Vict. No. 820	12 December 1884
An Act to amend "An Act to protect Game." (Note: Game Act 1867 (31 Vict. No. 311)) (Repealed by Game Act 1890 (54 Vict. No. 1095))
Railway Construction Act 1884 or the Octopus Act	48 Vict. No. 821	12 December 1884
An Act to authorize the Construction of certain Lines of Railway by the State and for other purposes.
Trades Unions Act 1884 (repealed)	48 Vict. No. 822	12 December 1884
An Act for the legalization of Trades Unions. (Repealed by Trade Unions Act 1890 (54 Vict. No. 1147))
	48 Vict. No. 823	12 December 1884
An Act to apply a sum out of the Consolidated Revenue to the service of the year ending on the thirtieth day of June One thousand eight hundred and eighty-five and to appropriate the Supplies granted in this Session of Parliament.
	48 Vict. No. 824	12 December 1884
An Act to amend "The Pounds Act 1874." (Note: Pounds Act 1874 (37 Vict. No. 478)) (Repealed by Pounds Act 1890 (54 Vict. No. 1129))
Agricultural Colleges Act 1884 (repealed)	48 Vict. No. 825	12 December 1884
An Act to provide for the establishment of Colleges of Agriculture and for other purposes. (Repealed by Agricultural Colleges Act 1890 (54 Vict. No. 1062))
Mining Accident Relief Fund Act 1884 (repealed)	48 Vict. No. 826	12 December 1884
An Act to establish a Fund for the relief of Sufferers by Mining Accidents and for other purposes. (Repealed by Mines Act 1890 (54 Vict. No. 1120))
County Court Judges Tenure of Office Act 1884 (repealed)	48 Vict. No. 827	12 December 1884
An Act to settle the Tenure of Office of the Judges of the County Courts, and for other purposes. (Repealed by County Court Act 1890 (54 Vict. No. 1078))
Married Women's Property Act 1884 (repealed)	48 Vict. No. 828	12 December 1884
An Act to consolidate and amend the Acts relating to the Property of Married Women. (Repealed by Married Women's Property Act 1890 (54 Vict. No. 1116))
Victorian Water Conservation Act 1884	48 Vict. No. 829	12 December 1884
An Act to amend "The Victorian Water Conservation Acts 1881 (Note: Victorian Water Conservation Act 1881 (45 Vict. No. 716)) and 1883." (Note: Victorian Water Conservation Act 1883 (47 Vict. No. 778))
	48 Vict. No. 830	12 December 1884
An Act to apply out of "The Victorian Railway Loan and Debentures Redemption Account 1883" certain sums of money for Preliminary Surveys of Railways and Tramways.
Local Government Amending Act 1884	48 Vict. No. 831	12 December 1884
An Act to further amend the "Local Government Act 1874." (Note: Local Government Act 1874 (38 Vict. No. 506))

== Sources ==
- "1884 Victorian Historical Acts". AustLII.
