= List of acts of the Parliament of Victoria from 1889 =

This is a list of acts of the Parliament of Victoria, Australia for the year 1889.

== 1889 ==
Short title, or popular name	Citation	Royal assent
Long title
	53 Vict. No. 1012	31 July 1889
An Act to apply out of the Consolidated Revenue the sum of Two million four hundred and thirty thousand six hundred pounds (Note: £2,430,000 in 1889 is equivalent to A$385,900,000 in 2022.) to the service of the year One thousand eight hundred and eighty nine and ninety.
	53 Vict. No. 1013	12 September 1889
An Act relating to Moneys recovered or recoverable for Breaches of "The Legislative Council Act 1881." (Note: Legislative Council Act 1881 (45 Vict. No. 702)) (Repealed by Constitution Act Amendment Act 1890 (54 Vict. No. 1075))
Merchandise Marks Act 1889	53 Vict. No. 1014	7 October 1889
An Act to consolidate and amend the Law relating to Fraudulent Marks on Merchandise and for other purposes.
Victorian Government Stock Act 1889	53 Vict. No. 1015	7 October 1889
An Act to authorize the raising of money for certain purposes by increasing the amount of Victorian Government Stock.
Elsternwick Public Lands Exchange Act 1889	53 Vict. No. 1016	7 October 1889
An Act to effect an exchange between the Victorian Railways Commissioners and the Board of Land and Works of certain Public Lands at Elsternwick.
Municipal Overdrafts (Indemnity) Act 1889 (repealed)	53 Vict. No. 1017	7 October 1889
An Act to indemnify the Councillors of various Municipalities for Borrowing Moneys by Overdrafts on Bankers for the purposes of their Municipalities contrary to the provisions of the "Local Government Act 1874" (Note: Local Government Act 1874 (38 Vict. No. 506)) and for other purposes. (Repealed by Local Government Act 1890 (54 Vict. No. 1112))
	53 Vict. No. 1018	9 October 1889
An Act to apply out of the Consolidated Revenue the sum of One million four hundred and nineteen thousand four hundred pounds (Note: £1,419,400 in 1889 is equivalent to A$225,400,000 in 2022.) to the service of the year One thousand eight hundred and eighty-nine and ninety.
Duties of Customs Act 1889 (repealed)	53 Vict. No. 1019	4 November 1889
An Act for granting to tier Majesty certain Duties of Customs in lieu of certain other Duties and for other purposes. (Repealed by Customs and Excise Duties Act 1890 (54 Vict. No. 1082))
Melbourne Police Court Site Act 1889	53 Vict. No. 1020	4 November 1889
An Act to provide for the acquisition of certain lands situate in the City of Melbourne by the mayor aldermen councillors and citizens thereof and for the erection of a new Police Court therein and for other purposes.
Police Offences Act 1889 (repealed)	53 Vict. No. 1021	4 November 1889
An Act to further amend "The Police Offences Statute 1865." (Note: Police Offences Statute 1865 (28 Vict. No. 265)) (Repealed by Police Offences Act 1890 (54 Vict. No. 1126))
Ammunition Factory Act 1889 (repealed)	53 Vict. No. 1022	4 November 1889
An Act to ratify a Lease of certain land granted by the Government of Victoria to the Colonial Ammunition Company Limited for the purposes of an Ammunition Factory. (Repealed by Statute Law Repeals Act 2007 (No. 21 of 2007))
Education Act 1889	53 Vict. No. 1023	4 November 1889
An Act to further amend the Law relating to Education.
Public Service Act 1889 (repealed)	53 Vict. No. 1024	7 November 1889
An Act to amend "The Public Service Act 1883." (Note: Public Service Act 1883 (47 Vict. No. 773)) (Repealed by Public Service Act 1890 (54 Vict. No. 1133))
Passengers Harbors and Navigation Act 1889 (repealed)	53 Vict. No. 1025	12 November 1889
An Act to amend "The Passengers Harbors and Navigation Statute 1865." (Note: Passengers Harbors and Navigation Statute 1865 (28 Vict. No. 255)) (Repealed by Marine Act 1890 (54 Vict. No. 1165))
Tobacco Act 1889 (repealed)	53 Vict. No. 1026	12 November 1889
An Act to amend "The Tobacco Act 1880." (Note: Tobacco Act 1880 (44 Vict. No. 668)) (Repealed by Customs and Excise Duties Act 1890 (54 Vict. No. 1082))
Life Assurance Companies Act 1889 (repealed)	53 Vict. No. 1027	25 November 1889
An Act to amend "The Life Assurance Companies Act 1873." (Note: Life Assurance Companies Act 1873 (37 Vict. No. 474)) (Repealed by Companies Act 1890 (54 Vict. No. 1074))
Vermin Destruction Act 1889 (repealed)	53 Vict. No. 1028	25 November 1889
An Act to provide for the Destruction and Suppression of Rabbits and other Vermin. (Repealed by Vermin Destruction Act 1890 (54 Vict. No. 1153))
Expiring Laws Continuance Act 1889	53 Vict. No. 1029	25 November 1889
An Act to continue various Expiring Laws.
	53 Vict. No. 1030	25 November 1889
An Act to apply out of "The Railway Loan Account 1888" or temporarily out of "The Public Account" certain sums of money for Railway Works and other purposes.
Melbourne Tramways Trust Amendment Act 1889	53 Vict. No. 1031	25 November 1889
An Act to authorize the Melbourne Tramways Trust to construct a Branch Tramway along Market-street to Collins-street in the City of Melbourne and for other purposes.
Railway Loan Act 1889	53 Vict. No. 1032	25 November 1889
An Act to authorize the Raising of Money for Railways and Irrigation Works and for other purposes.
Sunday (Newspapers) Act 1889 (repealed)	53 Vict. No. 1033	25 November 1889
An Act relating to the Publication and Sale of Newspapers on Sunday. (Repealed by Police Offences Act 1890 (54 Vict. No. 1126))
Patents Act 1889 (repealed)	53 Vict. No. 1034	25 November 1889
An Act to consolidate and amend the Law concerning Letters Patent for Inventions. (Repealed by Patents Act 1890 (54 Vict. No. 1123))
Intestates' Widows Relief Act 1889	53 Vict. No. 1035	25 November 1889
An Act for the Relief of Widows and Children of certain Intestates and for other purposes.
Fences Act 1889 (repealed)	53 Vict. No. 1036	25 November 1889
An Act to amend the Law relating to Fencing. (Repealed by Fences Act 1890 (54 Vict. No. 1092))
Wattle Trees Cultivation Act 1889 (repealed)	53 Vict. No. 1037	25 November 1889
An Act for the better encouragement of the Cultivation of Wattle Trees. (Repealed by Wattles Act 1890 (54 Vict. No. 1157))
Vesting of Lands Act 1889 (repealed)	53 Vict. No. 1038	25 November 1889
An Act to provide for the vesting of certain lands on certain conditions in The Melbourne Harbor Trust Commissioners. (Repealed by Melbourne Harbor Trust Act 1890 (54 Vict. No. 1119))
Water Supply Loans Act 1889	53 Vict. No. 1039	25 November 1889
An Act to sanction the issue and application of certain sums of money as Loans for Irrigation Works and Water Supply in the Country Districts and for other purposes.
Mallee Act 1889 (repealed)	53 Vict. No. 1040	25 November 1889
An Act to further amend "The Mallee Pastoral Leases Act 1883." (Note: Mallee Pastoral Leases Act 1883 (47 Vict. No. 766)) (Repealed by Land Act 1890 (54 Vict. No. 1106))
Medical Practitioners Act 1889 (repealed)	53 Vict. No. 1041	25 November 1889
An Act to enable persons other than natural born or naturalized subjects of Her Majesty to be registered as legally qualified Medical Practitioners and for other purposes. (Repealed by Medical Act 1890 (54 Vict. No. 1118))
Post Office Act 1889	53 Vict. No. 1042	25 November 1889
An Act to amend "The Post Office Act 1883" (Note: Post Office Act 1883 (47 Vict. No. 781)) and for other purposes.
	53 Vict. No. 1043	25 November 1889
An Act to apply a sum out of the Consolidated Revenue to the service of the year ending on the thirtieth day of June One thousand eight hundred and ninety and to appropriate the Supplies granted in this Session of Parliament.
Public Health Act 1889 (repealed)	53 Vict. No. 1044	25 November 1889
An Act to create a Department of Public Health and to further amend the Law relating to Public Health. (Repealed by Health Act 1890 (54 Vict. No. 1098))
Land Act 1889 (repealed)	53 Vict. No. 1045	25 November 1889
An Act relating to Crown Lands permanently reserved from sale and vested in Trustees. (Repealed by Land Act 1890 (54 Vict. No. 1106))
	53 Vict. No. 1046	25 November 1889
An Act relating to certain Grants for Promoting Agricultural and other Industries.
Irrigation Amendment Act 1889 (repealed)	53 Vict. No. 1047	25 November 1889
An Act to amend "The Irrigation Act 1886" (Note: Irrigation Act 1886 (50 Vict. No. 898)) and to extend the provisions of the same and for other purposes. (Repealed by Water Act 1890 (54 Vict. No. 1156))
Port Melbourne Lagoon Act 1889	53 Vict. No. 1048	25 November 1889
An Act to provide for the Suppression of the Nuisance arising from the Port Melbourne Lagoon and for other purposes.
Water Conservation Act 1889 (repealed)	53 Vict. No. 1049	25 November 1889
An Act to amend "The Water Conservation Act 1887." (Note: Water Conservation Act 1887 (51 Vict. No. 946)) (Repealed by Water Act 1890 (54 Vict. No. 1156))
	53 Vict. No. 1050	25 November 1889
An Act to enable the Trustees of the Melbourne Retreat for the Cure of Inebriates at Northcote to transfer the lands and premises vested in them to Her Majesty and for other purposes.
Federal Council Referring Act (Victoria) 1889 (repealed)	53 Vict. No. 1051	25 November 1889
An Act to refer certain matters to the Federal Council of Australasia for the exercise of Legislative Authority thereon. (Repealed by Statute Law Repeals Act 2007 (No. 21 of 2007))
Collingwood Municipal Lands Act 1889 (repealed)	53 Vict. No. 1052	25 November 1889
An Act to enable the Mayor Councillors and Citizens of the City of Collingwood to sell and convey certain lands situate in the said city. (Repealed by Statute Law Revision Act 1984 (No. 10087))
Duties on Estates Amendment Act 1889 (repealed)	53 Vict. No. 1053	25 November 1889
An Act to amend the "Duties on the Estates of Deceased Persons Statute 1870" (Note: Duties on the Estates of Deceased Persons Statute 1870 (34 Vict. No. 388)) and for other purposes. (Repealed by Administration and Probate Act 1890 (54 Vict. No. 1160))
Railway Melbourne Lands Exchange Act 1889	53 Vict. No. 1054	25 November 1889
An Act to amend "The Railway Melbourne Lands Exchange Act 1888" (Note: Railway Melbourne Lands Exchange Act 1888 (52 Vict. No. 1003)) and for other purposes.
Local Government Amendment Act 1889	53 Vict. No. 1055	25 November 1889
An Act to further amend the "Local Government Act 1874."

== Sources ==
- "1889 Victorian Historical Acts". AustLII.
