= List of acts of the Legislative Council of Victoria from 1854 =

This is a list of acts of the Legislative Council of Victoria, Australia for the year 1854.

== 1854 ==
Short title, or popular name	Citation	Royal assent
Long title
	17 Vict. No. 7	31 January 1854
An Act for applying certain Sums arising from the Revenue receivable in the Colony of Victoria to the Service thereof, for the year One thousand eight hundred and fifty-four, and for further appropriating the said Revenue.
	17 Vict. No. 8	23 February 1854
An Act to restrain the careless use of Fire. (Repealed by 21 Vict. No. 55)
	17 Vict. No. 9	1 March 1854
An Act for taking an Account of the Population of the Colony of Victoria.
	17 Vict. No. 10	14 March 1854
An Act to repeal certain Clauses of "An Act to regulate the making and sale of bread, and to prevent the adulteration thereof, and of meal and flour," (Note: 6 Will. IV. No. 1 (NSW)) and to make other provision instead thereof. (Repealed by Bakers and Millers Statute 1865 (28 Vict. No. 243))
	17 Vict. No. 11	14 March 1854
An Act to amend further the Law of Evidence. (Repealed by 21 Vict. No. 8)
	17 Vict. No. 12	23 March 1854
An Act for the Establishment and Management of Cemeteries in the Colony of Victoria. (Repealed by Cemeteries Statute 1864 (27 Vict. No. 201))
Melbourne Improvement Act 1854	17 Vict. No. 13	24 March 1854
An Act to enable the Mayor Aldermen Councillors and Citizens of the City of Melbourne to raise a sum or sums of Money not exceeding Five Hundred Thousand Pounds (Note: £500,000 in 1854 is equivalent to A$45,600,000 in 2022.) in the whole and for further amending the Acts relating to the Corporation thereof.
	17 Vict. No. 14	31 March 1854
An Act to extend the provisions of the Acts relating to legally qualified Medical Practitioners. (Repealed by Medical Practitioners Statute 1865 (28 Vict. No. 262))
Patents Act 1854 (repealed)	17 Vict. No. 15	31 March 1854
An Act to regulate Grants of Patents for Inventions in the Colony of Victoria. (Repealed by Patents Act 1857 (20 Vict. No. 3))
	17 Vict. No. 16	3 April 1854
An Act to give a preferable Lien on Wool from Season to Season and to make Mortgages of Stock valid without delivery. (Repealed by Instruments and Securities Statute 1864 (27 Vict. No. 204))
	17 Vict. No. 17	8 April 1854
An Act to amend an Act intituled "An Act for the general Regulation of the Customs in the Colony of Victoria." (Note: 16 Vict. No. 23) (Repealed by 21 Vict. No. 13)
	17 Vict. No. 18	8 April 1854
An Act to authorize a Tonnage Duty on Shipping. (Repealed by Passengers Harbors and Navigation Statute 1865 (28 Vict. No. 255)
Presbyterian Synod of Victoria Act 1854 or the Presbyterian Church Act Amendment Act 1854	17 Vict. No. 19	8 April 1854
An Act to regulate the Temporal Affairs of the Synod of Victoria and to amend the Law relating thereto.
	17 Vict. No. 20	11 April 1854
An Act to authorize for a limited period an Assessment on Stock. (Repealed by 21 Vict. No. 47)
	17 Vict. No. 21	11 April 1854
An Act to amend and extend an Act intituled "An Act to make provision for the better Administration of Justice in County Courts in the Colony of Victoria." (Note: 16 Vict. No. 11) (Repealed by 21 Vict. No. 29)
	17 Vict. No. 22	11 April 1854
An Act for Electric Telegraphs. (Repealed by Public Works Statute 1865 (29 Vict. No. 289))
Geelong Improvement Act 1854	17 Vict. No. 23	11 April 1854
An Act to enable the Mayor Aldermen Councillors and Burgesses of the Town of Geelong to raise a sum or sums of money not exceeding Two hundred thousand pounds (Note: £200,000 in 1854 is equivalent to A$18,300,000 in 2022.) in the whole and for further amending the Acts relating to the Corporation thereof.
	17 Vict. No. 24	
An Act to amend an Act intituled "An Act to consolidate and amend the Laws relating to the Licensing of Public Houses and to regulate the Sale of Fermented and Spirituous Liquors in New South Wales" (Note: 13 Vict. No. 29 (NSW)) and also an Act intituled "An Act to make provision for the Sale of Fermented and Spirituous Liquors and Refreshments in certain Districts" (Note: 16 Vict. No. 35) and to impose a Fee on the Registration of Names of Spirit Merchants. (Repealed by Wines Beer and Spirit Sale Statute 1864 (27 Vict. No. 227))
	17 Vict. No. 25	11 April 1854
An Act to amend an Act intituled "An Act for the Regulation of the Police Force." (Note: 16 Vict. No. 24) (Repealed by Police Regulation Statute 1865 (28 Vict. No. 257))
	17 Vict. No. 26	11 April 1854
An Act to amend an Act intituled "An Act to make provision for the better controul and disposal of Offenders." (Note: 16 Vict. No. 32) (Repealed by Statute of Gaols 1864 (27 Vict. No. 219))
	17 Vict. No. 27	12 April 1854
An Act for the Protection and Management of Wharfs. (Repealed by Passengers Harbors and Navigation Statute 1865 (28 Vict. No. 255))
	17 Vict. No. 28	12 April 1854
An Act to amend an Act intituled "An Act to consolidate and amend the Law relating to Ports Harbors and Shipping in the Colony of Victoria." (Note: 16 Vict. No. 12) (Repealed by Passengers Harbors and Navigation Statute 1865 (28 Vict. No. 255))
	17 Vict. No. 29	12 April 1854
An Act to amend an Act intituled "An Act for making and improving Roads in the Colony of Victoria." (Note: Roads Act 1853 (16 Vict. No. 40)) (Repealed by Public Works Statute 1865 (29 Vict. No. 289))
Postage Act 1854 (repealed)	17 Vict. No. 30	12 April 1854
An Act to amend the Law relating to the Post Office. (Repealed by Post Office Statute 1864 (27 Vict. No. 226))
Fitz Roy Ward Improvement Act 1854	17 Vict. No. 31	12 April 1854
An Act for Improvements in Fitz Roy Ward in the City of Melbourne.
	17 Vict. No. 32	25 March 1854 (Note: This act was reserved for approval by Her Majesty.)
An Act to extend the Elective Franchise. (Repealed by Electoral Act 1865 (29 Vict. No. 279))
Bank of Victoria Act 1854	17 Vict.	1 March 1854
An Act to Incorporate the Proprietors of a Banking Company called "The Bank of Victoria," and for other purposes therein mentioned.
	18 Vict. No. 1	6 October 1854
An Act to protect the rights of Inventors of articles at the Exhibition in Victoria of One thousand eight hundred and fifty-four. (Repealed by Patents Statute 1865 (28 Vict. No. 240))
Citizen Lists Extension of Time Act 1854	18 Vict. No. 2	20 October 1854
An Act to provide for the extension of the time allowed for the collection publication and exhibition of the Citizen Lists of the City of Melbourne and for the receipt of notices of claims and objections relating thereto.
	18 Vict. No. 3	16 November 1854
An Act to prevent the influx of criminals into Victoria. (Repealed by Crimes Act 1890 (54 Vict. No. 1079))
	18 Vict. No. 4	20 November 1854
An Act to make compulsory the Practice of Vaccination. (Repealed by Public Health Statute 1865 (28 Vict. No. 264))
	18 Vict. No. 5	20 November 1854
An Act to regulate the conveyance of Passengers to Victoria. (Repealed by Passengers Harbors and Navigation Statute 1865 (28 Vict. No. 255))
Foreign Seaman's Act 1854 (repealed)	18 Vict. No. 6	20 November 1854
An Act for the better control of Seamen belonging to Foreign Vessels. (Repealed by Seamen Statute 1865 (28 Vict. No. 245))
	18 Vict. No. 7	30 November 1854
An Act for volunteer corps in Victoria. (Repealed by Volunteer Statute 1864 (27 Vict. No. 205))
Common Lodging Houses' Act 1854 (repealed)	18 Vict. No. 8	30 November 1854
An Act for the well ordering of Common Lodging Houses in the Colony of Victoria. (Repealed by Public Health Statute 1865 (28 Vict. No. 264))
	18 Vict. No. 9	8 December 1854
An Act for granting Duties of Customs in the Colony of Victoria. (Repealed by Duties of Customs Act 1883 (47 Vict. No. 769))
	18 Vict. No. 10	14 December 1854
An Act for the more effectual prosecution of enquiries by Boards and Commissions.
	18 Vict. No. 11	14 December 1854
An Act to alter the law relating to the Chief Commissioner of Insolvent Estates. (Repealed by Insolvency Statute 1865 (28 Vict. No. 273))
City of Melbourne Gas and Coke Company's Act 1854	18 Vict.	14 December 1854
An Act to enable the City of Melbourne Gas and Coke Company to increase the capital of the said Company to the sum of one hundred thousand pounds, (Note: £100,000 in 1855 is equivalent to A$8,600,000 in 2022.) to be raised by the issue of six thousand shares of ten pounds (Note: £10 in 1854 is equivalent to A$860 in 2022.) each.
	18 Vict. No. 12	19 December 1854
An Act to indemnify all persons who have proclaimed or acted under the authority of Martial Law within a certain district in Victoria. (Note: Eureka Rebellion.)
	18 Vict. No. 13	19 December 1854
An Act for promoting the public Health in populous places in the Colony of Victoria. (Repealed by Public Health Statute 1865 (28 Vict. No. 264))
Town and Country Police Act 1854 (repealed)	18 Vict. No. 14	19 December 1854
An Act to provide for the management of Towns and other places in Victoria. (Repealed by Police Offences Statute 1864 (27 Vict. No. 225))
Municipal Institutions Act 1854 (repealed)	18 Vict. No. 15	29 December 1854
An Act for the establishment of Municipal Institutions in Victoria. (Repealed by Municipal Corporations Act 1863 (27 Vict. No. 184))

== Sources ==
- "1854 Victorian Historical Acts". AustLII.
