= State of the art =

Highest development that can be achieved

The state of the art (SOTA or SotA, sometimes cutting edge, leading edge, or bleeding edge) refers to the highest level of general development, as of a device, technique, or scientific field achieved at a particular time. However, in some contexts it can also refer to a level of development reached at any particular time as a result of the common methodologies employed at the time.

The term has been used since 1910, and has become both a common term in advertising and marketing, and a legally significant phrase with respect to both patent law and tort liability.

In advertising, the phrase is often used to convey that a product is made with the best or latest available technology, but it has been noted that "the term 'state of the art' requires little proof on the part of advertisers", as it is considered mere puffery. The use of the term in patent law "does not connote even superiority, let alone the superlative quality the ad writers would have us ascribe to the term".

== Origin and history ==
The concept of the "state of the art" originated at the beginning of the 20th century. The earliest use of the term "state of the art" documented by the Oxford English Dictionary dates back to 1910, from an engineering manual by Henry Harrison Suplee (1856 – after 1943), an engineering graduate (University of Pennsylvania, 1876), titled The Gas Turbine: Progress in the Design and Construction of Turbines Operated by Gases of Combustion. The relevant passage reads: "In the present state of the art this is all that can be done". The term "art" refers to technics, rather than performing or fine arts.

Over time, use of the term increased in all fields where this kind of art has a significant role. In this relation it has been quoted by the author that "although eighteenth-century writers did not use the term, there was indeed in existence a collection of scientific and engineering knowledge and expertise that can be identified as the state of the art for that time".

Despite its actual meaning, which does not convey technology that is ahead of the industry, the phrase became so widely used in advertising that a 1985 article described it as "overused", stating that "[it] has no punch left and actually sounds like a lie". A 1994 essay listed it among "the same old tired clichés" that should be avoided in advertising.

== Legal importance ==
=== Patent law ===
In the context of European and Australian patent law, the term "state of the art" is a concept used in the process of assessing and asserting novelty and inventive step, and is a synonym of the expression "prior art". In the European Patent Convention (EPC), "[t]he state of the art shall be held to comprise everything made available to the public by means of a written or oral description, by use, or in any other way, before the date of filing of the European patent application" according to Article 54(2) EPC. Due account should be taken of Article 54(3) EPC as well, but merely for the examination of novelty.

The expression "background art" is also used in certain legal provisions, such as Rule 42(1)(b) and(c) EPC (previously Rule 27(1)(b) and (c) EPC 1973), and has the same meaning.

=== Tort liability ===
The state of the art is important in the law of tort liability, specifically in the areas of negligence and product liability. With respect to negligence, "an engineer may defend against a claim of negligence by contending that he met the standards of his profession and the state of the art". With respect to product liability, manufacturers generally have strict liability for any injury caused by defects in their products. However, in some jurisdictions a manufacturer may raise as a legal defense the assertion that their product represents the "state of the art", and that the manufacturer therefore could not have made the product any safer in light of the knowledge available at the time. For example, "[u]nder German law, the producer can also raise the state-of-the-art defense: general tort law does not hold him liable if he could not know or discover the defect for lack of fault, and the Product Liability Statute expressly provides for this defense". This defense is available throughout the European Community under the Product Liability Directive, art. 7(e). Pursuant to this article:

The state-of-the-art defense allows a defendant to be absolved of liability if he can prove that the state of technical and scientific knowledge, at the time when he put the product into circulation, was not such as to enable the existence of the defect to be discovered. The Directive allows Member States to eliminate the state-of-the-art defense, but only Luxembourg, which has little manufacturing industry, has done so.

In the United States, the state of an industry is "merely evidence of due care rather than a controlling factor", but a number of states have state-of-the-art statutes that "make a manufacturer's compliance with technological feasibility an absolute defense to a products liability suit". Because the state of the art is constantly advancing, the ability of manufacturers to claim that their products are "state-of-the-art" tracks their potential liability when these products are defective. As an industry magazine explained in 1984:

Remote control rear view mirrors, disc brakes, automatic slack adjusters for drum brakes and sealed lighting systems are just a few examples of products that have advanced the state of the art. When one of these gains a degree of industry acceptance, it begins to bridge a legal gap between what is state of the art from a design standpoint, and what is state of the art from a usage standpoint. This could place a carrier in a vulnerable position in the not too distant future.

== See also ==
- Emerging technologies (List of emerging technologies)
- Innovation
- Luxury goods
- Proof of concept
