= List of acts of the Parliament of Victoria from 1872 =

This is a list of acts of the Parliament of Victoria, Australia for the year 1872.

== 1872 ==
Continuing the first session of the seventh parliament of Victoria.

Short title, or popular name	Citation	Royal assent
Long title
	35 Vict. No. 417	17 May 1872 (Note: This act was reserved for approval by Her Majesty.)
An Act to Amend "The Discipline Act 1870." (Note: Discipline Act 1870 (34 Vict. No. 389)) (Repealed by Defences and Discipline Act 1890 (54 Vict. No. 1083))

The second session of the seventh parliament of Victoria.

Short title, or popular name	Citation	Royal assent
Long title
	36 Vict. No. 418	23 July 1872
An Act to amend "The Prevention of Diseases of Animals Statute 1864." (Note: Prevention of Diseases of Animals Statute 1864 (27 Vict. No. 231)) (Repealed by Diseases in Stock Act 1872 (36 Vict. No. 451))
	36 Vict. No. 419	23 July 1872
An Act to apply out of the Consolidated Revenue the sum of One hundred and nine thousand and forty-one pounds eight shillings and nine pence to the service of the year One thousand eight hundred and seventy-one and two, and Seven hundred thousand pounds to the service of the year One thousand eight hundred and seventy-two and three.
	36 Vict. No. 420	29 August 1872
An Act to sanction the issue and application of certain Sums of Money from "The Railway Loan Account," for Salaries Wages and Contingencies for the Service of the year One thousand eight hundred and seventy-two and One thousand eight hundred and seventy-three.
	36 Vict. No. 421	29 August 1872
An Act to sanction the issue and application of certain sums of money from "The Railway Loan Liquidation and Construction Account" established under the provision of section forty-two of 33 Vict. No. 360. (Note: Land Act 1869 (33 Vict. No. 360))
Exhibitors Protection Act 1872	36 Vict. No. 422	29 August 1872
An Act to protect Exhibitors of New Inventions and Works of Industry and Art.
	36 Vict. No. 423	29 August 1872
An Act to sanction the issue and expenditure of certain sums from "The Public Works Loan Account" for Salaries Wages and Contingencies for the service of the year ending the Thirtieth day of June One thousand eight hundred and seventy-three.
Police Offences Statute Amendment Act 1872 (repealed)	36 Vict. No. 424	23 October 1872
An Act to amend "The Police Offences Statute 1865" (Note: Police Offences Statute 1865 (28 Vict. No. 265)) and for the Suppression of Betting and Gaming Houses. (Repealed by Police Offences Act 1890 (54 Vict. No. 1126))
	36 Vict. No. 425	23 October 1872
An Act to amend the Law relating to the Collection and Payment of the Public Moneys, the Audit of the Public Accounts, and the Protection and Recovery of the Public Property. (Repealed by Audit Act 1890 (54 Vict. No. 1066))
South Melbourne Gas Company's Act 1872	36 Vict. No. 426	23 October 1872
An Act to incorporate a Company to be called "The South Melbourne Gas Company," and for other purposes.
Administration Act 1872	36 Vict. No. 427	23 October 1872
An Act for amending the Law relating to the Administration of the Estates of Deceased Persons.
Public Works Loan Act 1872	36 Vict. No. 428	28 November 1872
An Act to authorize the Raising of Money for Public Works and other purposes.
	36 Vict. No. 429	10 December 1872
An Act to apply out of the Consolidated Revenue the sum of Seventeen thousand pounds to the service of the year One thousand eight hundred and seventy-one and two, and One hundred and eighty-three thousand pounds to the service of the year One thousand eight hundred and seventy-two and three.
	36 Vict. No. 430	17 December 1872
An Act to apply a sum out of the Consolidated Revenue to the service of the year ending on the last day of June One thousand eight hundred and seventy-three, and to appropriate the supplies granted in this Session of Parliament.
Statute of Gaols Further Amendment Act 1872 (repealed)	36 Vict. No. 431	17 December 1872
An Act to further amend the Law relating to Gaols. (Repealed by Gaols Act 1890 (54 Vict. No. 1096))
Patents Act 1872 (repealed)	36 Vict. No. 432	17 December 1872
An Act to amend "The Patents Statute 1865." (Note: Patents Statute 1865 (28 Vict. No. 240)) (Repealed by Patents Act 1889 (53 Vict. No. 1034))
	36 Vict. No. 433	17 December 1872
An Act to further amend the "Real Property Statute 1864." (Note: Real Property Statute 1864 (27 Vict. No. 213)) (Repealed by Real Property Act 1890 (54 Vict. No. 1136))
Drawbacks Act 1872 (repealed)	36 Vict. No. 434	17 December 1872
An Act to enable the allowance of Drawbacks on the exportation of certain Goods from Victoria, and for other purposes. (Repealed by Customs Act 1890 (54 Vict. No. 1081))
	36 Vict. No. 435	17 December 1872
An Act to make better Provision for the Office of Master-in-Equity, and for better securing the Moneys of the Suitors of the Supreme Court.
	36 Vict. No. 436	17 December 1872
An Act to amend the Laws relating to or affecting public Health, and to prevent the Sale of Adulterated or Unwholesome Food or Drink. (Repealed by Public Health Amendment Act 1876 ( 39 Vict. No. 524))
	36 Vict. No. 437	17 December 1872
An Act to further amend an Act intituled "An Act to make provision for the better administration of Justice in the Colony of Victoria." (Note: 15 Vict. No. 10) (Repealed by Supreme Court Act 1890 (54 Vict. No. 1142))
Amended Game Act 1872 (repealed)	36 Vict. No. 438	17 December 1872
An Act to amend an Act intituled "An Act to Protect Game." (Note: Game Act 1867 (31 Vict. No. 311)) (Repealed by Game Act Amendment Act 1873 (37 Vict. No. 464))
Debentures Conversion Act 1872	36 Vict. No. 439	17 December 1872
An Act for converting Debentures into Victorian Stock and to give further facilities to the holders of such Stock.
	36 Vict. No. 440	17 December 1872
An Act to amend "The Importation and Custody of Gunpowder Statute 1864." (Note: Importation and Custody of Gunpowder Statute 1864 (27 Vict. No. 196)) (Repealed by Explosives Act 1885 (49 Vict. No. 853))
Agent-General's Act 1872 (repealed)	36 Vict. No. 441	17 December 1872
An Act to make better provision for the Office of Agent-General. (Repealed by Agent-General's Act 1890 (54 Vict. No. 1061))
Amending Waterworks Statute 1872 (repealed)	36 Vict. No. 442	17 December 1872
An Act to amend "The Waterworks Act 1865," (Note: Waterworks Act 1865 (29 Vict. No. 288)) and "The Waterworks Commissioners Act 1869." (Note: Waterworks Commissioners Act 1869 (33 Vict. No. 347)) (Repealed by Waterworks Act 1880 (44 Vict. No. 656))
	36 Vict. No. 443	17 December 1872
An Act to amend "The Statute of Evidence 1864." (Note: Statute of Evidence 1864 (27 Vict. No. 197)) (Repealed by Evidence Act 1890 (54 Vict. No. 1088))
	36 Vict. No. 444	17 December 1872
An Act to sanction the issue and expenditure of certain sums from "The Public Works Loan Account 1872" for Salaries Wages and Contingencies for the service of the year ending the Thirtieth day of June One thousand eight hundred and seventy-three.
	36 Vict. No. 445	17 December 1872
An Act to amend "The Juries Statute 1865." (Note: Juries Statute 1865 (28 Vict. No. 272)) (Repealed by Juries Statute 1876 (40 Vict. No. 560))
Mining Statute 1865 Amendment Act 1872 (repealed)	36 Vict. No. 446	17 December 1872
An Act to amend the "Mining Statute 1865." (Note: Mining Statute 1865 (29 Vict. No. 291)) (Repealed by Mines Act 1890 (54 Vict. No. 1120))
Education Act 1872 (repealed)	36 Vict. No. 447	17 December 1872
An Act to amend the Law relating to Education. (Repealed by Education Act 1890 (54 Vict. No. 1086))
Local Governing Bodies Loan Act 1872 (repealed)	36 Vict. No. 448	17 December 1872
An Act to authorize Local Governing Bodies to make Rates and give Security on Waterworks Tolls and Rates for Loans advanced. (Repealed by Water Act 1890 (54 Vict. No. 1156))
Inebriates Act 1872	36 Vict. No. 449	17 December 1872
An Act to provide for the Treatment and Cure of Inebriates.
	36 Vict. No. 450	17 December 1872
An Act to direct the application of a sum of One hundred thousand pounds appropriated by "The Public Works Loan Act 1872" (Note: Public Works Loan Act 1872 (?)) for Loans to Municipal and other Corporations for Water Supply.
Diseases in Stock Act 1872 (repealed)	36 Vict. No. 451	17 December 1872
An Act for the Prevention of Diseases in Stock. (Repealed by Stock Diseases Act 1890 (54 Vict. No. 1141))
	36 Vict. No. 452	17 December 1872
An Act to provide further for the Salaries of the Judges of the Supreme Court of the Colony of Victoria. (Repealed by Supreme Court Act 1890 (54 Vict. No. 1142))

== Sources ==
- "1872 Victorian Historical Acts". AustLII.
