= NRDC =

NRDC may refer to:

- Natural Resources Defense Council, an American environmental group
- National Research Development Corporation, a UK company set up to license government research to industrial partners
- NRDC Equity Partners, an American retail holding company
- NATO Rapid Deployable Corps – Italy, an Italian military formation.
- U.S. Army Natick Research and Development Center, a research and development center for soldier equipment
- Nardilysin, an enzyme encoded by the gene NRDC

== See also ==
- National Research Development Corporation v Commissioner of Patents, a 1959 Australian patent law case
- NDRC (disambiguation)
