= List of acts of the Parliament of Victoria from 1890 =

This is a list of acts of the Parliament of Victoria, Australia for the year 1890.

== 1890 ==
Short title, or popular name	Citation	Royal assent
Long title
Divorce Act 1889 (Note: Although passed in the year 1889, and given a short title ending '...Act 1889', the need to obtain approval for this act from the United Kingdom meant it was not proclaimed until the year 1890.) (repealed)	53 Vict. No. 1056	13 May 1890 (Note: This act was reserved for approval by Her Majesty.)
An Act to amend the Law of Divorce. (Repealed by Marriage Act 1890 (54 Vict. No. 1166))
Railway Loan Amendment Act 1890	54 Vict. No. 1057	25 June 1890
An Act to amend The Railway Loan Act 1889. (Note: Railway Loan Act 1889 (53 Vict. No. 1032))
Acts Interpretation Act 1890 (repealed)	54 Vict. No. 1058	10 July 1890
An Act for the Interpretation of Legislative Enactments and for shortening the Language used therein. (Repealed by Acts Interpretation Act 1915 (6 Geo. V. No. 2609))
Aborigines Act 1890 (repealed)	54 Vict. No. 1059	10 July 1890
An Act to consolidate the Laws relating to the Aboriginal Natives or Victoria. (Repealed by Aborigines Act 1915 (6 Geo. V. No. 2610))
Administration and Probate Act 1890 (repealed)	54 Vict. No. 1060	10 July 1890
An Act to consolidate the Law relating to the Administration of the Estates of Deceased Persons. (Repealed by Administration and Probate Act 1915 (6 Geo. V. No. 2611))
Agent-General's Act 1890 (repealed)	54 Vict. No. 1061	10 July 1890
An Act to consolidate the Laws relating to the Agent-General for Victoria. (Repealed by Agent-General's Act 1915 (6 Geo. V. No. 2612))
Agricultural Colleges Act 1890 (repealed)	54 Vict. No. 1062	10 July 1890
An Act to consolidate the Law relating to Colleges of Agriculture. (Repealed by Agricultural Colleges Act 1915 (6 Geo. V. No. 2613))
Aliens Act 1890	54 Vict. No. 1063	10 July 1890
An Act to consolidate the Law relating to Aliens.
Animals Protection Act 1890 (repealed)	54 Vict. No. 1064	10 July 1890
An Act to consolidate the Law relating to the Protection of Animals. (Repealed by Police Offences Act 1912 (3 Geo. V. No. 2422))
Auction Sales Act 1890 (repealed)	54 Vict. No. 1065	10 July 1890
An Act to consolidate the Law relating to Sales by Auction and Auctioneers. (Repealed by Auction Sales Act 1915 (6 Geo. V. No. 2615))
Audit Act 1890 (repealed)	54 Vict. No. 1066	10 July 1890
An Act to consolidate the Law for the Collection and Payment of the Public moneys the Audit of the Public Accounts and the Protection and Recovery of the Public Property. (Repealed by Audit Act 1915 (6 Geo. V. No. 2516))
Bakers and Millers Act 1890 (repealed)	54 Vict. No. 1067	10 July 1890
An Act to consolidate the Laws relating to Bakers and Millers. (Repealed by Bakers and Millers Act 1915 (6 Geo. V. No. 2617))
Building Societies Act 1890 (repealed)	54 Vict. No. 1068	10 July 1890
An Act to consolidate the Law relating to Building Societies. (Repealed by Building Societies Act 1915 (6 Geo. V. No. 2622))
Butchers and Abattoirs Act 1890 (repealed)	54 Vict. No. 1069	10 July 1890
An Act to consolidate the Laws relating to Butchers and Abattoirs. (Repealed by Butchers and Abattoirs Act 1915 (6 Geo. V. No. 2623))
Carriages Act 1890 (repealed)	54 Vict. No. 1070	10 July 1890
An Act to consolidate the Law relating to Licensed Carriages. (Repealed by Carriages Act 1915 (6 Geo. V. No. 2624))
Carriers and Innkeepers Act 1890 (repealed)	54 Vict. No. 1071	10 July 1890
An Act to consolidate the Law relating to Carriers Innkeepers and others. (Repealed by Carriers and Innkeepers Act 1915 (6 Geo. V. No. 2625))
Cemeteries Act 1890 (repealed)	54 Vict. No. 1072	10 July 1890
An Act to consolidate the Laws relating to Cemeteries. (Repealed by Cemeteries Act 1915 (6 Geo. V. No. 2626))
Chinese Act 1890	54 Vict. No. 1073	10 July 1890
An Act to consolidate the Laws affecting the Chinese immigrating to or resident in Victoria.
Companies Act 1890 (repealed)	54 Vict. No. 1074	10 July 1890
An Act to consolidate the Law relating to Companies. (Repealed by Companies Act 1915 (6 Geo. V. No. 2631))
Constitution Act Amendment Act 1890 (repealed)	54 Vict. No. 1075	10 July 1890
An Act to consolidate the Law relating to the Amendment of the Constitution. (Repealed by Constitution Act Amendment Act 1915 (6 Geo. V. No. 2632))
Copyright Act 1890	54 Vict. No. 1076	10 July 1890
An Act to consolidate the Law relating to Copyright.
Coroners Act 1890 (repealed)	54 Vict. No. 1077	10 July 1890
An Act to consolidate the Law relating to Coroners. (Repealed by Coroners Act 1911 (2 Geo. V. No. 2343))
County Court Act 1890 (repealed)	54 Vict. No. 1078	10 July 1890
An Act to consolidate the Laws relating to County Courts. (Repealed by County Court Act 1915 (6 Geo. V. No. 2636))
Crimes Act 1890 (repealed)	54 Vict. No. 1079	10 July 1890
An Act to consolidate the Law relating to Crimes and Criminal Offenders. (Repealed by Crimes Act 1915 (6 Geo. V. No. 2637))
Crown Remedies and Liability Act 1890 (repealed)	54 Vict. No. 1080	10 July 1890
An Act to consolidate the Law relating to the Protection and Recovery of Crown Property and the enforcement of Claims against the Crown. (Repealed by Crown Remedies and Liability Act 1915 (6 Geo. V. No. 2638))
Customs Act 1890	54 Vict. No. 1081	10 July 1890
An Act to consolidate the Laws relating to the Customs.
Customs and Excise Duties Act 1890	54 Vict. No. 1082	10 July 1890
An Act to consolidate the Law relating to Duties of Customs and of Excise.
Defences and Discipline Act 1890	54 Vict. No. 1083	10 July 1890
An Act to consolidate the Laws relating to Defences and Discipline.
Dog Act 1890 (repealed)	54 Vict. No. 1084	10 July 1890
An Act to consolidate the Law relating to Dogs. (Repealed by Dog Act 1915 (6 Geo. V. No. 2641))
Drainage of Land Act 1890 (repealed)	54 Vict. No. 1085	10 July 1890
An Act to consolidate the Law relating to the Drainage of Land for Agricultural and other purposes. (Repealed by Drainage of Land Act 1915 (6 Geo. V. No. 2643))
Education Act 1890 (repealed)	54 Vict. No. 1086	10 July 1890
An Act to consolidate the Law relating to Education. (Repealed by Education Act 1915 (6 Geo. V. No. 2644))
Employers and Employés Act 1890 or the Employers and Employees Act 1890 (repealed)	54 Vict. No. 1087	10 July 1890
An Act to consolidate the Laws relating to Employers and Employés. (Repealed by Employers and Employés Act 1915 (6 Geo. V. No. 2646))
Evidence Act 1890 (repealed)	54 Vict. No. 1088	10 July 1890
An Act to consolidate the Law of Evidence. (Repealed by Evidence Act 1915 (6 Geo. V. No. 2647))
Exhibitions Act 1890	54 Vict. No. 1089	10 July 1890
An Act to consolidate the Law relating to Exhibitions.
Explosives Act 1890 (repealed)	54 Vict. No. 1090	10 July 1890
An Act to consolidate the Laws relating to the Importation Carriage Storage Manufacture and Sale of Explosives. (Repealed by Explosives Act 1915 (6 Geo. V. No. 2648))
Factories and Shops Act 1890 (repealed)	54 Vict. No. 1091	10 July 1890
An Act to consolidate the Law relating to the supervision and regulation of Factories and Workrooms and the limitation of the Hours of Trading in Shops. (Repealed by Factories and Shops Act 1905 (5 Edw. VII. No. 1975))
Fences Act 1890 (repealed)	54 Vict. No. 1092	10 July 1890
An Act to consolidate the Law relating to Dividing Fences. (Repealed by Fences Act 1915 (6 Geo. V. No. 2651))
Fisheries Act 1890 (repealed)	54 Vict. No. 1093	10 July 1890
An Act to consolidate the Law relating to Fisheries. (Repealed by Fisheries Act 1915 (6 Geo. V. No. 2654))
Friendly Societies Act 1890 (repealed)	54 Vict. No. 1094	10 July 1890
An Act to consolidate the Law relating to Friendly Societies. (Repealed by Friendly Societies Act 1915 (6 Geo. V. No. 2656))
Game Act 1890 (repealed)	54 Vict. No. 1095	10 July 1890
An Act to consolidate the Law relating to the Protection of Game. (Repealed by Game Act 1915 (6 Geo. V. No. 2653))
Gaols Act 1890 (repealed)	54 Vict. No. 1096	10 July 1890
An Act to consolidate the Law relating to Gaols. (Repealed by Gaols Act 1915 (6 Geo. V. No. 2659))
Hawkers and Pedlers Act 1890 (repealed)	54 Vict. No. 1097	10 July 1890
An Act to consolidate the Law relating to Hawkers and Pedlers. (Repealed by Hawkers and Pedlers Act 1915 (6 Geo. V. No. 2664))
Health Act 1890 (repealed)	54 Vict. No. 1098	10 July 1890
An Act to consolidate the Law relating to Public Health. (Repealed by Health Act 1915 (6 Geo. V. No. 2665))
Hospitals and Charities Act 1890 (repealed)	54 Vict. No. 1099	10 July 1890
An Act to consolidate the Law relating to Hospitals and Charities. (Repealed by Hospitals and Charities Act 1915 (6 Geo. V. No. 2666))
Imprisonment of Fraudulent Debtors Act 1890 (repealed)	54 Vict. No. 1100	10 July 1890
An Act to consolidate the Law relating to the Imprisonment of Fraudulent Debtors. (Repealed by Imprisonment of Fraudulent Debtors Act 1915 (6 Geo. V. No. 2667))
Inebriates Act 1890 (repealed)	54 Vict. No. 1101	10 July 1890
An Act to consolidate the Law relating to the Care and Cure of Inebriates. (Repealed by Inebriates Act 1904 (4 Edw. VII. No. 1940))
Insolvency Act 1890 (repealed)	54 Vict. No. 1102	10 July 1890
An Act to consolidate the Law relating to Insolvents and their Estates. (Repealed by Insolvency Act 1915 (6 Geo. V. No. 2671))
Instruments Act 1890 (repealed)	54 Vict. No. 1103	10 July 1890
An Act to consolidate the Law relating to Instruments and Securities. (Repealed by Instruments Act 1915 (6 Geo. V. No. 2672))
Juries Act 1890 (repealed)	54 Vict. No. 1104	10 July 1890
An Act to consolidate the Law relating to Juries. (Repealed by Juries Act 1915 (6 Geo. V. No. 2674))
Justices Act 1890 (repealed)	54 Vict. No. 1105	10 July 1890
An Act to consolidate the Law relating to Justices of the Peace and Courts of General and Petty Sessions. (Repealed by Justices Act 1915 (6 Geo. V. No. 2675))
Land Act 1890 (repealed)	54 Vict. No. 1106	10 July 1890
An Act to consolidate the Laws relating to the Sale and Occupation of Crown Lands, and for other purposes. (Repealed by Land Act 1901 (1 Edw. VII. No. 1749))
Land Tax Act 1890	54 Vict. No. 1107	10 July 1890
An Act to consolidate the Law relating to Land Tax.
Landlord and Tenant Act 1890 (repealed)	54 Vict. No. 1108	10 July 1890
An Act to consolidate the Laws relating to Landlord and Tenant. (Repealed by Landlord and Tenant Act 1915 (6 Geo. V. No. 2677))
Lands Compensation Act 1890 (repealed)	54 Vict. No. 1109	10 July 1890
An Act to consolidate the Law relating to the mode of procedure in taking and determining the Compensation to be paid for Lands required by the State for Public Works. (Repealed by Lands Compensation Act 1915 (6 Geo. V. No. 2678))
Libraries Act 1890 (repealed)	54 Vict. No. 1110	10 July 1890
An Act to consolidate the Laws relating to Libraries. (Repealed by Libraries Act 1915 (6 Geo. V. No. 2682))
Licensing Act 1890 (repealed)	54 Vict. No. 1111	10 July 1890
An Act to consolidate the Laws relating to the Licensing of Public Houses and the Sale of Fermented and Spirituous Liquors. (Repealed by Licensing Act 1915 (6 Geo. V. No. 2683))
Local Government Act 1890 (repealed)	54 Vict. No. 1112	10 July 1890
An Act to consolidate the Laws relating to Local Government. (Repealed by Local Government Act 1903 (3 Edw. VII. No. 1893))
Lunacy Act 1890 (repealed)	54 Vict. No. 1113	10 July 1890
An Act to consolidate the Law relating to Lunatics. (Repealed by Lunacy Act 1915 (6 Geo. V. No. 2687))
Marine Stores and Old Metals Act 1890 (repealed)	54 Vict. No. 1114	10 July 1890
An Act to consolidate the Laws relating to Collectors of and Dealers in Special Wares Marine Stores and Old Metals. (Repealed by Marine Stores and Old Metals Act 1915 (6 Geo. V. No. 2689))
Markets Act 1890 (repealed)	54 Vict. No. 1115	10 July 1890
An Act to consolidate the Laws relating to Markets. (Repealed by Markets Act 1915 (6 Geo. V. No. 2690))
Married Women's Property Act 1890 (repealed)	54 Vict. No. 1116	10 July 1890
An Act to consolidate the Law relating to the Property of Married Women. (Repealed by Married Women's Property Act 1915 (6 Geo. V. No. 2692))
Master and Apprentice Act 1890 (repealed)	54 Vict. No. 1117	10 July 1890
An Act to consolidate the Law relating to Masters and Apprentices. (Repealed by Master and Apprentice Act 1915 (6 Geo. V. No. 2693))
Medical Act 1890 (repealed)	54 Vict. No. 1118	10 July 1890
An Act to consolidate the Law relating to Medical Practitioners Dentists and Chemists and to adopt and continue the British Pharmacopœia. (Repealed by Medical Act 1915 (6 Geo. V. No. 2695))
Melbourne Harbor Trust Act 1890 (repealed)	54 Vict. No. 1119	10 July 1890
An Act to consolidate the Law providing for the Regulation Management and Improvement of the Port of Melbourne and certain portions of the River Yarra Yarra and certain portions of the Saltwater River and for other purposes connected therewith. (Repealed by Melbourne Harbor Trust Act 1915 (6 Geo. V. No. 2697)
Mines Act 1890 (repealed)	54 Vict. No. 1120	10 July 1890
An Act to consolidate the Law relating to Mines. (Repealed by Mines Act 1915 (6 Geo. V. No. 2698))
Neglected Children's Act 1890 (repealed)	54 Vict. No. 1121	10 July 1890
An Act to consolidate the Law relating to Neglected Children. (Repealed by Neglected Children's Act 1915 (6 Geo. V. No. 2703))
Partnership Act 1890 (repealed)	54 Vict. No. 1122	10 July 1890
An Act to consolidate the Law relating to the Exemption of certain Contracts from the Law of Partnerships. (Repealed by Partnership Act 1891 (55 Vict. No. 1222))
Patents Act 1890	54 Vict. No. 1123	10 July 1890
An Act to consolidate the Law concerning Letters Patent for Inventions.
Pawnbrokers Act 1890 (repealed)	54 Vict. No. 1124	10 July 1890
An Act to consolidate the Laws relating to Pawnbrokers. (Repealed by Pawnbrokers Act 1915 (6 Geo. V. No. 2705))
Poisons Act 1890 (repealed)	54 Vict. No. 1125	10 July 1890
An Act to consolidate the Law relating to the Sale and Use of Poisons. (Repealed by Poisons Act 1915 (6 Geo. V. No. 2707))
Police Offences Act 1890 (repealed)	54 Vict. No. 1126	10 July 1890
An Act to consolidate the Law relating to the Management of Towns and other Populous Places and for the Suppression of various Offences. (Repealed by Police Offences Act 1912 (3 Geo. V. No. 2422))
Police Regulation Act 1890 (repealed)	54 Vict. No. 1127	10 July 1890
An Act to consolidate the Law relating to the Police Force in Victoria. (Repealed by Police Regulation Act 1915 (6 Geo. V. No. 2709))
Post Office Act 1890	54 Vict. No. 1128	10 July 1890
An Act to consolidate the Law relating to the Post Office and for other purposes.
Pounds Act 1890 (repealed)	54 Vict. No. 1129	10 July 1890
An Act to consolidate the Law relating to the Impounding of Cattle. (Repealed by Pounds Act 1915 (6 Geo. V. No. 2710))
Printers and Newspapers Act 1890 (repealed)	54 Vict. No. 1130	10 July 1890
An Act to consolidate the Laws relating to the pre-venting the Printing and Publishing of Books and Papers by Persons not known and to the Printing and Publishing of Newspapers. (Repealed by Printers and Newspapers Act 1915 (6 Geo. V. No. 2711))
Provident Societies Act 1890 (repealed)	54 Vict. No. 1131	10 July 1890
An Act to consolidate the Law relating to Provident Societies. (Repealed by Provident Societies Act 1915 (6 Geo. V. No. 2712))
Public Moneys Act 1890 (repealed)	54 Vict. No. 1132	10 July 1890
An Act to consolidate the Law relating to Penalties. (Repealed by Penalties Act 1915 (6 Geo. V. No. 2706))
Public Service Act 1890 (repealed)	54 Vict. No. 1133	10 July 1890
An Act to consolidate the Laws relating to the Public Service of Victoria. (Repealed by Public Service Act 1915 (6 Geo. V. No. 2713))
Public Works Act 1890 (repealed)	54 Vict. No. 1134	10 July 1890
An Act to consolidate the Laws relating to Public Works. (Repealed by Public Works Act 1915 (6 Geo. V. No. 2714))
Railways Act 1890 (repealed)	54 Vict. No. 1135	10 July 1890
An Act to consolidate the Law relating to Railways. (Repealed by Railways Act 1915 (6 Geo. V. No. 2716))
Real Property Act 1890 (repealed)	54 Vict. No. 1136	10 July 1890
An Act to consolidate the Laws relating to Real Property. (Repealed by Real Property Act 1915 (6 Geo. V. No. 2719))
Registration of Births Deaths and Marriages Act 1890 (repealed)	54 Vict. No. 1137	10 July 1890
An Act to consolidate the Law relating to the Registration of Births Deaths and Marriages. (Repealed by Registration of Births Deaths and Marriages Act 1915 (6 Geo. V. No. 2720))
Savings Banks Act 1890 (repealed)	54 Vict. No. 1138	10 July 1890
An Act to consolidate the Law relating to Savings Banks. (Repealed by State Savings Bank Act 1915 (6 Geo. V. No. 2729))
Seamen's Act 1890 (repealed)	54 Vict. No. 1139	10 July 1890
An Act to consolidate the Law relating to Seamen. (Repealed by Seamen's Act 1915 (6 Geo. V. No. 2721))
Stamps Act 1890 (repealed)	54 Vict. No. 1140	10 July 1890
An Act to consolidate the Law relating to Stamps. (Repealed by Stamps Act 1915 (6 Geo. V. No. 2728))
Stock Diseases Act 1890 (repealed)	54 Vict. No. 1141	10 July 1890
An Act to consolidate the Laws relating to Diseases in Stock. (Repealed by Stock Diseases Act 1915 (6 Geo. V. No. 2731))
Supreme Court Act 1890 (repealed)	54 Vict. No. 1142	10 July 1890
An Act to consolidate the Law relating to the Supreme Court. (Repealed by Supreme Court Act 1915 (6 Geo. V. No. 2733))
Temperance Halls Act 1890 (repealed)	54 Vict. No. 1143	10 July 1890
An Act to consolidate the Law enabling Trustees of Temperance Halls to demise certain lands for terms of years and to raise Loans on the Rents of such lands and buildings and for other purposes. (Repealed by Temperance Halls Act 1915 (6 Geo. V. No. 2734))
Theatres Act 1890 (repealed)	54 Vict. No. 1144	10 July 1890
An Act to consolidate the Law relating to Licensed Theatres. (Repealed by Theatres Act 1915 (6 Geo. V. No. 2735))
Thistle Act 1890 (repealed)	54 Vict. No. 1145	10 July 1890
An Act to consolidate the Law relating to the Eradication of Thistles. (Repealed by Thistle Act 1915 (6 Geo. V. No. 2736))
Trade Marks Act 1890	54 Vict. No. 1146	10 July 1890
An Act to consolidate the Law relating to Trade Marks.
Trade Unions Act 1890 (repealed)	54 Vict. No. 1147	10 July 1890
An Act to consolidate the Law relating to Trade Unions. (Repealed by Trade Unions Act 1915 (6 Geo. V. No. 2737))
Tramways Act 1890 (repealed)	54 Vict. No. 1148	10 July 1890
An Act to consolidate the Law relating to Tramways. (Repealed by Tramways Act 1915 (6 Geo. V. No. 2739))
Transfer of Land Act 1890 (repealed)	54 Vict. No. 1149	10 July 1890
An Act to consolidate the Law relating to the Simplification of the Title to and the Dealing with Estates in Land. (Repealed by Transfer of Land Act 1915 (6 Geo. V. No. 2740))
Trusts Act 1890 (repealed)	54 Vict. No. 1150	10 July 1890
An Act to consolidate the Law relating to Trusts and Trustees. (Repealed by Trusts Act 1915 (6 Geo. V. No. 2741))
University Act 1890 (repealed)	54 Vict. No. 1151	10 July 1890
An Act to consolidate the Law relating to the University of Melbourne. (Repealed by University Act 1915 (6 Geo. V. No. 2742))
Unlawful Assemblies and Processions Act 1890 (repealed)	54 Vict. No. 1152	10 July 1890
An Act to consolidate the Law relating to Unlawful Assemblies and Processions Special Constables and Riotously Disturbed Districts. (Repealed by Unlawful Assemblies and Processions Act 1915 (6 Geo. V. No. 2743))
Vermin Destruction Act 1890 (repealed)	54 Vict. No. 1153	10 July 1890
An Act to consolidate the Law relating to the Destruction and Suppression of Rabbits and other Vermin. (Repealed by Vermin Destruction Act 1915 (6 Geo. V. No. 2745))
Veterinary Surgeons Act 1890 (repealed)	54 Vict. No. 1154	10 July 1890
An Act to consolidate the Law relating to Veterinary Surgeons. (Repealed by Veterinary Surgeons Act 1915 (6 Geo. V. No. 2746)
Vine Disease Act 1890 (repealed)	54 Vict. No. 1155	10 July 1890
An Act to consolidate the Law relating to Vine Diseases. (Repealed by Vegetation and Vine Diseases Act 1915 (6 Geo. V. No. 2744))
Water Act 1890 (repealed)	54 Vict. No. 1156	10 July 1890
An Act to consolidate the Law relating to the Supply and Conservation of Water. (Repealed by Water Act 1905 (5 Edw. VII. No. 2016))
Wattles Act 1890 (repealed)	54 Vict. No. 1157	10 July 1890
An Act to consolidate the Law relating to the Cultivation of Wattle Trees. (Repealed by Land Act 1901 (1 Edw. VII. No. 1749))
Weights and Measures Act 1890 (repealed)	54 Vict. No. 1158	10 July 1890
An Act to consolidate the Law relating to Weights and Measures. (Repealed by Weights and Measures Act 1915 (6 Geo. V. No. 2748))
Wills Act 1890 (repealed)	54 Vict. No. 1159	10 July 1890
An Act to consolidate the Laws relating to Wills. (Repealed by Wills Act 1915 (6 Geo. V. No. 2749))
Wrongs Act 1890 (repealed)	54 Vict. No. 1160	10 July 1890
An Act to consolidate the Laws relating to Wrongs. (Repealed by Wrongs Act 1915 (6 Geo. V. No. 2751))
Customs Act 1890 (No. 2)	54 Vict. No. 1161	14 July 1890
An Act relating to Appeals under the Acts relating to the Customs.
	54 Vict. No. 1162	28 July 1890
An Act relating to Shire Boundaries.
Electoral Rolls Validating Act 1890 (repealed)	54 Vict. No. 1163	1 August 1890
An Act to validate the Electoral Rolls of certain Electoral Divisions, the boundaries of which were altered in November and December One thousand eight hundred and eighty-nine. (Repealed by Constitution Act Amendment Act 1915 (6 Geo. V. No. 2632))
Banks and Currency Act 1890 (repealed)	54 Vict. No. 1164	8 December 1890 (Note: This act was deemed by section 33 of the Acts Interpretation Act 1890 (54 Vict. No. 1058) to have come into effect on 1 August 1890.)
An Act to consolidate the Laws relating to Banks and the Currency. (Repealed by Banks and Currency Act 1915 (6 Geo. V. No. 2618))
Marine Act 1890 (repealed)	54 Vict. No. 1165	8 December 1890
An Act to consolidate the Law relating to Passengers Harbours and Navigation. (Repealed by Marine Act 1915 (6 Geo. V. No. 2688))
Marriage Act 1890 (repealed)	54 Vict. No. 1166	8 December 1890
An Act to consolidate the Laws relating to Marriage and to Custody of Children and to Deserted Wives and Children and to Divorce and Matrimonial Causes. (Repealed by Marriage Act 1915 (6 Geo. V. No. 2691))
Mint Act 1890 (repealed)	54 Vict. No. 1167	8 December 1890
An Act to consolidate the Law relating to the Maintenance in Victoria of a Branch of the Royal Mint. (Repealed by Mint Act 1915 (6 Geo. V. No. 2700))
	54 Vict. No. 1168	1 August 1890
An Act to apply out of the Consolidated Revenue the sum of Four hundred and twenty thousand eight hundred and twenty-eight pounds to the service of the year One thousand eight hundred and eighty-nine and ninety, and the sum of Two million three hundred and six thousand one hundred and twenty pounds to the service of the year One thousand eight hundred and ninety and ninety-one.
Portland Shire Hall Act 1890 (repealed)	54 Vict. No. 1169	1 September 1890
An Act to enable the President Councillors and Ratepayers of the Shire of Portland to sell and convey certain lands at Walook in the said shire and to apply the proceeds of such sale towards the cost of erecting a Shire Hall and Municipal Offices elsewhere within the said shire. (Repealed by Statute Law Revision Act 1984 (No. 10087))
Land Act 1890 (No. 2) (repealed)	54 Vict. No. 1170	15 September 1890
An Act to amend the Land Act 1890. (Note: Land Act 1890 (54 Vict. No. 1106)) (Repealed by Land Act 1901 (1 Edw. VII. No. 1749))
Census Act 1891 (Note: Although given a short title ending '...Act 1891', this act was passed in the year 1890.)	54 Vict. No. 1171	15 September 1890
An Act for taking a Census of the Population and of the Live Stock in Victoria.
Church of England Land Enabling Act 1890	54 Vict. No. 1172	15 September 1890
An Act to enable the Church of England Trusts Corporation for the Diocese of Melbourne, with the consent of the Bishop in Council, to lease or sell certain settled land at Kew, in the parish of Boroondara, in the colony of Victoria.
Melbourne Tramways Trust (Borrowing Powers) Act 1890	54 Vict. No. 1173	22 September 1890
An Act to facilitate the Borrowing of further Money by The Melbourne Tramways Trust and for other purposes.
Real Property Act 1890 (No. 2) (repealed)	54 Vict. No. 1174	29 September 1890
An Act to amend the Real Property Act 1890 (Note: Real Property Act 1890 (54 Vict. No. 1136)) and for other purposes. (Repealed by Transfer of Land Act 1915 (6 Geo. V. No. 2740))
Presbyterian Trusts Act 1890	54 Vict. No. 1175	6 October 1890
An Act to provide for the creation of a Corporate Body of Trustees in which Property belonging to "The Presbyterian Church of Victoria" may be vested and for other purposes.
Consolidating Acts Revision Act 1890	54 Vict. No. 1176	6 October 1890
An Act to correct errors in the Consolidating Acts and for other purposes.
Railways Standing Committee Act 1890 (repealed)	54 Vict. No. 1177	9 October 1890
An Act to provide for the Appointment of a Parliamentary Standing Committee on Railway Works and for other purposes. (Repealed by Railways Standing Committee Act 1915 (6 Geo. V. No. 2717))
	54 Vict. No. 1178	24 October 1890
An Act to apply out of the Consolidated Revenue the sum of One million one hundred and eighty-nine thousand seven hundred and seventy-three pounds to the service of the year One thousand eight hundred and ninety and ninety-one.
	54 Vict. No. 1179	24 October 1890
An Act to amend The Melbourne Hydraulic Power Company's Act 1887 (Note: Melbourne Hydraulic Power Company's Act 1887 (51 Vict. No. 944)) and for other purposes.
Municipal Overdrafts (Indemnity) Act 1890	54 Vict. No. 1180	8 December 1890
An Act to indemnify the Councillors of various Municipalities for Borrowing Moneys by Overdrafts on Bankers for the purposes of their Municipalities contrary to the provisions of the Local Government Act 1890 (Note: Local Government Act 1890 (54 Vict. No. 1112)) and for other purposes.
Oaths and Evidence Act 1890 (repealed)	54 Vict. No. 1181	9 December 1890
An Act to amend the Law of Evidence. (Repealed by Evidence Act 1915 (6 Geo. V. No. 2647))
Melbourne Harbor Trust Act 1890 (No. 2) (repealed)	54 Vict. No. 1182	19 December 1890
An Act to amend the Melbourne Harbor Trust Act 1890 (Note: Melbourne Harbor Trust Act 1890 (54 Vict. No. 1119)) and for other purposes. (Repealed by Melbourne Harbor Trust Act 1915 (6 Geo. V. No. 2697)
Trade Marks Act 1890 (No. 2)	54 Vict. No. 1183	19 December 1890
An Act to consolidate and amend the Law relating to the Registration of Trade Marks.
Cape Patterson and Kilcunda Junction Railway Act Amendment Act 1890	54 Vict. No. 1184	19 December 1890
An Act to amend and continue an Act intituled "An Act to authorize the construction of the Cape Patterson and Kilcunda Junction Railway and for other purposes." (Note: Cape Patterson and Kilcunda Junction Railway Act 1888 (52 Vict. No. 980))
Consolidating Acts Revision Act 1890 (No. 2)	54 Vict. No. 1185	19 December 1890
An Act to correct further errors in the Consolidating Acts.
Treasury Bonds Act 1890	54 Vict. No. 1186	19 December 1890
An Act to authorize the issue of Treasury Bonds.
Rail Loan Application Act 1890	54 Vict. No. 1187	19 December 1890
An Act to apply out of "The Railway Loan Account 1888" or temporarily out of "The Public Account" certain sums of money for Railway Works and other purposes.
Water Supply Loans Act 1890	54 Vict. No. 1188	19 December 1890
An Act to sanction the issue and application of certain sums of money as Loans for Irrigation Works and Water Supply in the Country Districts and for other purposes.
Mines Act Amendment Act 1890	54 Vict. No. 1189	19 December 1890
An Act to amend the Mines Act 1890. (Note: Mines Act 1890 (54 Vict. No. 1120))
Partition Act 1890 (repealed)	54 Vict. No. 1190	19 December 1890
An Act to amend the Law relating to Partition. (Repealed by Real Property Act 1915 (6 Geo. V. No. 2719))
Declarations and Affidavits Act 1890 (repealed)	54 Vict. No. 1191	19 December 1890
An Act to provide for the Appointment of Commissioners for taking Declarations. (Repealed by Evidence Act 1915 (6 Geo. V. No. 2647))
Geelong Agricultural Site Act 1890	54 Vict. No. 1192	19 December 1890
An Act to authorize the Sale of the Geelong and Western District Agricultural and Horticultural Society's Show Yards Site and for other purposes.
North Melbourne Railway Lands Exchange Act 1890	54 Vict. No. 1193	19 December 1890
An Act to authorize an exchange between the Victorian Railways Commissioners and the proprietors of certain lands at North Melbourne.
	54 Vict. No. 1194	20 December 1890
An Act to apply a sum out of the Consolidated Revenue to the service of the year ending on the thirtieth day of June One thousand eight hundred and ninety-one and to appropriate the Supplies granted in this Session of Parliament.
Suburban Tramways Company Act 1890	54 Vict. No. 1195	20 December 1890
An Act to authorize the Suburban Tramways Company Limited to construct Tramways in the Cities of Melbourne Richmond Prahran Collingwood and St. Kilda and for other purposes.
Victorian Stock Act 1890	54 Vict. No. 1196	20 December 1890
An Act to amend The Railway Loan Act 1888 (Note: Railway Loan Act 1888 (52 Vict. No. 989)) and for other purposes.
Melbourne and Metropolitan Board of Works Act 1890 (repealed)	54 Vict. No. 1197	20 December 1890
An Act to provide for the better Local Management of the Metropolis and for the creation of a Melbourne and Metropolitan Board of Works. (Repealed by Melbourne and Metropolitan Board of Works Act 1915 (6 Geo. V. No. 2696))
Infant Life Protection Act 1890 (repealed)	54 Vict. No. 1198	20 December 1890
An Act to make better provision for the Protection of Infant Life and for other purposes. (Repealed by Infant Life Protection Act 1915 (6 Geo. V. No. 2670))
Supreme Court Rules Act 1890	54 Vict. No. 1199	20 December 1890
An Act relating to the Rules Regulations and Orders of the Supreme Court.
Fire Brigades Act 1890 (repealed)	54 Vict. No. 1200	20 December 1890
An Act to make better provision for the Protection of Life and Property from Fire and for other purposes. (Repealed by Fire Brigades Act 1915 (6 Geo. V. No. 2653))
Evidence Act 1890 (No. 2) (repealed)	54 Vict. No. 1201	20 December 1890
An Act to amend the Law of Evidence. (Repealed by Evidence Act 1915 (6 Geo. V. No. 2647))
Mines Act 1890 (No. 2)	54 Vict. No. 1202	20 December 1890
An Act relating to Mining on Pastoral, Grazing, and Other Lands.
Waterworks Construction Encouragement Act 1890	54 Vict. No. 1203	20 December 1890
An Act to amend The Waterworks Construction Encouragement Act 1886. (Note: Waterworks Construction Encouragement Act 1886 (50 Vict. No. 910))

== Sources ==
- "1890 Victorian Historical Acts". AustLII.
