= List of acts of the Parliament of Victoria from 1865 =

This is a list of acts of the Parliament of Victoria, Australia for the year 1865.

== 1865 ==
Continuing the third session of the third parliament of Victoria.

Short title, or popular name	Citation	Royal assent
Long title
Statute of Trusts 1864 (repealed)	28 Vict. No. 234	27 January 1865 (Note: This act was reserved for approval by Her Majesty.)
An Act to Consolidate the Law relating to Trusts and Trustees. (Repealed by Trusts Act 1890 (54 Vict. No. 1150))
	28 Vict. No. 235	27 January 1865
An Act to amend the Law relating to the Pensions of Responsible Officers. (Repealed by Constitution Act Amendment Act 1890 (54 Vict. No. 1075))

The fourth parliament of Victoria.

Short title, or popular name	Citation	Royal assent
Long title
	28 Vict. No. 236	31 January 1865
An Act to apply out of the Consolidated Revenue the sum of Sixty thousand pounds (Note: £60,000 in 1865 is equivalent to A$8,300,000 in 2022.) to the service of the year One thousand eight hundred and sixty-four and Five hundred thousand pounds (Note: £500,000 in 1865 is equivalent to A$68,800,000 in 2022.) to the service of the year One thousand eight hundred and sixty-five.
Amending Land Act 1865 or the Land Act 1865 (repealed)	28 Vict. No. 237	23 March 1865
An Act to amend "The Land Act 1862." (Note: Land Act 1862 (25 Vict. No. 145)) (Repealed by Land Act 1869 (33 Vict. No. 360))
	28 Vict. No. 238	23 March 1865
An Act to Remove Doubts as to the Validity of Certain Mining Bye-Laws. (Repealed by Mining Statute 1865 (29 Vict. No. 291))
Fences Statute 1865 (repealed)	28 Vict. No. 239	9 May 1865
An Act to Consolidate the Law relating to Dividing Fences. (Repealed by Fences Act 1890 (54 Vict. No. 1092))
Patents Statute 1865 (repealed)	28 Vict. No. 240	9 May 1865
An Act to Consolidate the Law concerning Letters Patent for Inventions. (Repealed by Patents Act 1889 (53 Vict. No. 1034))
Crown Remedies and Liability Statute 1865 (repealed)	28 Vict. No. 241	9 May 1865
An Act to Consolidate the Law relating to the Protection and recovery of Crown Property and the enforcement of Claims against the Crown. (Repealed by Crown Remedies and Liability Act 1890 (54 Vict. No. 1080))
Equity Practice Statute 1865 (repealed)	28 Vict. No. 242	9 May 1865
An Act to Consolidate the Law relating to the Practice in the Supreme Court in its Equitable Jurisdiction. (Repealed by Supreme Court Act 1890 (54 Vict. No. 1142))
Bakers and Millers Statute 1865 (repealed)	28 Vict. No. 243	9 May 1865
An Act to Consolidate the Laws relating to Bakers and Millers. (Repealed by Bakers and Millers Act 1890 (54 Vict. No. 1067))
Religious Trusts Statute 1865 (repealed)	28 Vict. No. 244	9 May 1865
An Act to Consolidate the Law relating to Trusts for Religious purposes. (Repealed by Trusts Act 1890 (54 Vict. No. 1150))
Seamen Statute 1865 (repealed)	28 Vict. No. 245	9 May 1865
An Act to Consolidate the Law relating to Seamen. (Repealed by Seamen's Act 1890 (54 Vict. No. 1139))
Registration of Births Deaths and Marriages Statute 1865 (repealed)	28 Vict. No. 246	9 May 1865
An Act to Consolidate the Law relating to the Registration of Births Deaths and Marriages. (Repealed by Registration of Births Deaths and Marriages Act 1890 (54 Vict. No. 1137))
Unlawful Assemblies and Party Processions Statute 1865 (repealed)	28 Vict. No. 247	9 May 1865
An Act to Consolidate the Law relating to Unlawful Assemblies Special Constables and Riotously Disturbed Districts. (Repealed by Unlawful Assemblies and Processions Act 1890 (54 Vict. No. 1152))
Pawnbrokers Statute 1865 (repealed)	28 Vict. No. 248	9 May 1865
An Act to Consolidate the Laws relating to Pawnbrokers. (Repealed by Pawnbrokers Act 1890 (54 Vict. No. 1124))
Pounds Statute 1865 (repealed)	28 Vict. No. 249	9 May 1865
An Act to Consolidate the Law relating to the Impounding of Cattle. (Repealed by Pounds Act 1874 (37 Vict. No. 478))
Thistle Prevention Statute 1865 (repealed)	28 Vict. No. 250	9 May 1865
An Act to Consolidate the Law relating to the Eradication of Thistles. (Repealed by Thistle Act 1890 (54 Vict. No. 1145))
Statute of Wrongs 1865 (repealed)	28 Vict. No. 251	9 May 1865
An Act to Consolidate the Laws relating to Wrongs. (Repealed by Wrongs Act 1890 (54 Vict. No. 1160))
Licensed Theatres Statute 1865 (repealed)	28 Vict. No. 252	9 May 1865
An Act to Consolidate the Law relating to Licensed Theatres. (Repealed by Theatres Act 1890 (54 Vict. No. 1144))
Coroners Statute 1865 (repealed)	28 Vict. No. 253	9 May 1865
An Act to Consolidate the Law relating to Coroners. (Repealed by Coroners Act 1890 (54 Vict. No. 1077)
Friendly Societies Statute 1865 (repealed)	28 Vict. No. 254	9 May 1865
An Act to Consolidate the Law relating to Friendly Societies. (Repealed by Friendly Societies Act 1890 (54 Vict. No. 1094))
Passengers Harbors and Navigation Statute 1865 (repealed)	28 Vict. No. 255	9 May 1865
An Act to Consolidate the Law relating to Passengers Harbors and Navigation. (Repealed by Marine Act 1890 (54 Vict. No. 1165))
Aliens Statute 1865 (repealed)	28 Vict. No. 256	9 May 1865
An Act to Consolidate the Law relating to Aliens. (Repealed by Aliens Act 1890 (54 Vict. No. 1063))
Police Regulation Statute 1865 (repealed)	28 Vict. No. 257	9 May 1865
An Act to Consolidate the Law relating to the Police Force in Victoria. (Repealed by Police Regulation Statute 1873 (37 Vict. No. 476))
Hawkers and Pedlers Statute 1865 (repealed)	28 Vict. No. 258	9 May 1865
An Act to Consolidate the Law relating to Hawkers and Pedlers. (Repealed by Hawkers and Pedlers Statute 1865 (No. 2) (29 Vict. No. 281))
Chinese Immigrants Statute 1865 (repealed)	28 Vict. No. 259	9 May 1865
An Act to amend the Laws affecting the Chinese immigrating to or resident in Victoria. (Repealed by Chinese Act 1890 (54 Vict. No. 1073))
	28 Vict. No. 260	17 May 1865
An Act to apply out of the Consolidated Revenue the sum of Twenty-four thousand two hundred and ninety-four pounds nineteen shillings and fourpence (Note: £22,294 19s 4d in 1865 is equivalent to A$3,100,000 in 2022.) to the service of the year One thousand eight hundred and sixty-four and Two hundred thousand pounds (Note: £200,000 in 1865 is equivalent to A$27,500,000 in 2022.) to the service of the year One thousand eight hundred and sixty-five.
County Courts Statute 1865 (repealed)	28 Vict. No. 261	1 June 1865
An Act for the Consolidation of the Law relating to County Courts. (Repealed by County Court Statute 1869 (33 Vict. No. 345))
Medical Practitioners Statute 1865 (repealed)	28 Vict. No. 262	1 June 1865
An Act to Consolidate the Laws relating to Medical Practitioners. (Repealed by Medical Act 1890 (54 Vict. No. 1118))
Savings Banks Statute 1865 (repealed)	28 Vict. No. 263	1 June 1865
An Act to Consolidate the Law relating to Savings Banks. (Repealed by Savings Banks Act 1890 (54 Vict. No. 1138))
Public Health Statute 1865 (repealed)	28 Vict. No. 264	1 June 1865
An Act to consolidate the Laws relating to Public Health. (Repealed by Health Act 1890 (54 Vict. No. 1098))
Police Offences Statute 1865 (repealed)	28 Vict. No. 265	1 June 1865
An Act to Consolidate the Law relating to the Management of Towns and other Populous Planes and for the suppression of various Offences. (Repealed by Police Offences Act 1890 (54 Vict. No. 1126))
Volunteer Statute 1865 (repealed)	28 Vict. No. 266	1 June 1865
An Act to Consolidate the Laws relating to the Volunteer Force. (Repealed by Defences and Discipline Act 1890 (54 Vict. No. 1083))
Justices of the Peace Statute 1865	28 Vict. No. 267	1 June 1865
An Act to Consolidate and amend the Law relating to Justices of the Peace and Courts of General and Petty Sessions.
Marriage and Matrimonial Causes Statute 1864 (Note: Although passed in 1864, and given a short title ending '...Statute 1864', the need to obtain approval from the United Kingdom meant this act was proclaimed in 1865.) (repealed)	28 Vict. No. 268	13 June 1865 (Note: This act was reserved for approval by Her Majesty.)
An Act to Consolidate the Laws relating to Marriage and to Deserted Wives and Children and to Divorce and Matrimonial Causes. (Repealed by Marriage Act 1890 (54 Vict. No. 1156))
St. Kilda and Brighton Railway Sale Act 1865 (repealed)	28 Vict. No. 269	15 June 1865
An Act to authorise the Sale and Purchase of the St. Kilda and Brighton Railway and for other purposes. (Repealed by 42 Vict. No. 617)
Melbourne and Hobson's Bay United Railway Company's Act 1865 (repealed)	28 Vict. No. 270	15 June 1865
An Act to Amalgamate the Melbourne and Hobson's Bay Railway Company and the Melbourne Railway Company and for other purposes. (Repealed by 42 Vict. No. 617)
	28 Vict. No. 271	15 June 1865
An Act to Repeal the Thirty-eighth Section of the Act (Note: 16 Vict.) of Incorporation of The Melbourne and Hobson's Bay Railway Company upon the payment and expenditure of certain sums of money and to relieve the United Company formed by the amalgamation of the said company with the Melbourne Railway Company from certain reservations in their Crown grants and to make provisions respecting bridges and level crossings and for other purposes. (Repealed by 42 Vict. No. 617)
Juries Statute 1865 (repealed)	28 Vict. No. 272	15 June 1865
An Act to amend the Law for Regulating Juries. (Repealed by Juries Statute 1876 (40 Vict. No. 560))
Insolvency Statute 1865 (repealed)	28 Vict. No. 273	15 June 1865
An Act to Consolidate the Law relating to Insolvents and their Estates. (Repealed by Insolvency Statute 1871 (34 Vict. No. 379))
Common Law Procedure Statute 1865	28 Vict. No. 274	15 June 1865
An Act to Consolidate the Laws relating to the Pleading and Practice of the Supreme Court in its Common Law Jurisdiction.
	28 Vict. No. 275	15 June 1865
An Act to amend an Act intituled "An Act to amend the Law relating to the Drainage of Quartz Reefs." (Note: 25 Vict. No. 153) (Repealed by Mining Statute 1865 (29 Vict. No. 291))
	29 Vict. No. 276	30 June 1865
An Act to apply out of the Consolidated Revenue the sum of Two hundred thousand pounds to the service of the year One thousand eight hundred and sixty-five.
Post Office Statute 1865 (repealed)	29 Vict. No. 277	28 July 1865
An Act to amend the Law relating to the Post Office. (Repealed by Post Office Statute 1866 (29 Vict. No. 298))
Sandhurst and Inglewood Tramway Act 1865	29 Vict. No. 278	28 July 1865
An Act to incorporate a Company for the purpose of making constructing and maintaining a Tramway or Railway between the Boroughs of Sandhurst and Inglewood to be called "The Sandhurst and Inglewood Tramway Company."
Electoral Act 1865	29 Vict. No. 279	28 July 1865
An Act to Consolidate and Amend the Law relating to Electors and Elections of Members to serve in Parliament.
Liens on Crops Act 1865 (repealed)	29 Vict. No. 280	20 September 1865
An Act to Legalize Preferable Liens on Yearly Crops. (Repealed by Instruments Act 1890 (54 Vict. No. 1103))
Hawkers and Pedlers Statute 1865 (No. 2) (repealed)	29 Vict. No. 281	20 September 1865
An Act to amend the Law relating to Hawkers and Pedlers. (Repealed by Hawkers and Pedlers Act 1890 (54 Vict. No. 1097))
	29 Vict. No. 282	20 September 1865
An Act to provide for the better Administration of Justice in County Courts. (Repealed by County Court Statute 1869 (33 Vict. No. 345))
	29 Vict. No. 283	20 September 1865
An Act to amend and explain "The Instruments and Securities Statute 1864." (Note: Instruments and Securities Statute 1864 (27 Vict. No. 204)) (Repealed by Instruments Act 1890 (54 Vict. No. 1103))
	29 Vict. No. 284	20 September 1865
An Act to amend the Law for Imprisonment for Debt. (Repealed by Imprisonment of Fraudulent Debtors Act 1890 (54 Vict. No. 1100))
Victorian Mint Act 1865 (repealed)	29 Vict. No. 285	20 September 1865
An Act to make permanent provision for a Mint in Victoria. (Repealed by Victorian Mint Act 1867 (31 Vict. No. 307))
	29 Vict. No. 286	12 October 1865
An Act to explain and amend the Fisheries and Game Statute. (Note: Fisheries and Game Statute 1864 (27 Vict. No. 206)) (Repealed by Fisheries Act 1873 (37 Vict. No. 473))
Public Loan Act 1865	29 Vict. No. 287	12 October 1865
An Act to authorise the raising of Money for certain Public Purposes.
Waterworks Act 1865 (repealed)	29 Vict. No. 288	12 October 1865
An Act to authorise Works for Supplying Water to certain districts and places in Victoria. (Repealed by Water Act 1890 (54 Vict. No. 1156))
Public Works Statute 1865 (repealed)	29 Vict. No. 289	12 October 1865
An Act to amend and consolidate the Laws relating to Public Works. (Repealed by Public Works Act 1890 (54 Vict. No. 1134))
	29 Vict. No. 290	12 October 1865
An Act to explain and amend "The Common Law Procedure Statute 1865." (Note: Common Law Procedure Statute 1865 (28 Vict. No. 274)) (Repealed by Supreme Court Act 1890 (54 Vict. No. 1142))
Mining Statute 1865 (repealed)	29 Vict. No. 291	28 November 1865
An Act to provide for the Management of and the Administration of Justice in relation to Mining Interests. (Repealed by Mines Act 1890 (54 Vict. No. 1120))
	29 Vict. No. 292	28 November 1865
An Act to amend the Act numbered Two hundred and eighty-four. (Note: 29 Vict. No. 284) (Repealed by Imprisonment of Fraudulent Debtors Act 1890 (54 Vict. No. 1100))

== Sources ==
- "1865 Victorian Historical Acts". AustLII.
