= List of acts of the Parliament of Victoria from 1857 =

This is a list of acts of the Parliament of Victoria, Australia for the year 1857.

== 1857 ==
The first session of the first parliament of Victoria.

Short title, or popular name	Citation	Royal assent
Long title
	20 Vict. No. 1	25 February 1857
An Act for defining the Privileges Immunities and Powers of the Legislative Council and Legislative Assembly of Victoria respectively. (Repealed by Constitution Act Amendment Act 1890 (54 Vict. No. 1075))
	20 Vict. No. 2	25 February 1857
An Act for taking an account of the Population.
Patents Act 1857 (repealed)	20 Vict. No. 3	11 March 1857
An Act concerning Letters Patent for Inventions. (Repealed by Patents Statute 1865 (28 Vict. No. 240))
	20 Vict. No. 4	11 March 1857
An Act to amend the Laws relative to the vending of Fermented and Spirituous Liquors. (Repealed by Wines Beer and Spirit Sale Statute 1864 (27 Vict. No. 227))
	21 Vict. No. 5	9 July 1857
An Act to amend the Law relating to Bills of Lading. (Repealed by Instruments and Securities Statute 1864 (27 Vict. No. 204))
	21 Vict. No. 6	9 July 1857
An Act to amend the Law relating to Drafts or Checks on Bankers. (Repealed by Instruments and Securities Statute 1864 (27 Vict. No. 204))
	21 Vict. No. 7	9 July 1857
An Act for granting a Duty of Customs on Opium. (Repealed by 29 Vict. No. 293)
	21 Vict. No. 8	9 July 1857
An Act to consolidate and amend the Law of Evidence. (Repealed by 24 Vict. No. 100)
	21 Vict. No. 9	9 July 1857
An Act to reduce the Fee payable for certain Licenses. (Repealed by Wines Beer and Spirit Sale Statute 1864 (27 Vict. No. 227))
	21 Vict. No. 10	27 August 1857
An Act to Reduce the Fees on Registering Friendly Societies. (Repealed by Friendly Societies Statute 1865 (28 Vict. No. 254))
	21 Vict. No. 11	27 August 1857
An Act to ratify an Exchange of Land between Her Majesty and the Corporation of the City of Melbourne and for other purposes. (Repealed by Land (Miscellaneous Matters) Act 1985 (No. 10224))
	21 Vict. No. 12	27 August 1857
An Act to Abolish the Property Qualification required by Members of the Legislative Assembly. (Repealed by Constitution Act Amendment Act 1890 (54 Vict. No. 1075))
Customs Act 1857 (repealed)	21 Vict. No. 13	27 August 1857
An Act to consolidate and amend the Laws relating to the Customs. (Repealed by Customs Act 1883 (47 Vict. No. 768))
	21 Vict. No. 14	27 August 1857
An Act to enable "The City of Melbourne Gas and Coke Company" to Raise the Sum of One Hundred and Fifty Thousand Pounds (Note: £150,000 in 1857 is equivalent to A$15,600,000 in 2022.) by the issue of Thirty Thousand Shares of Five Pounds (Note: £5 in 1857 is equivalent to A$520 in 2022.) each in addition to their present Capital of One Hundred Thousand Pounds (Note: £100,000 in 1857 is equivalent to A$10,400,000 in 2022.) and for other purposes.
	21 Vict. No. 15	27 August 1857
An Act to amend the Law relating to Gold Coin. (Repealed by 29 Vict. No. 293)
	21 Vict. No. 16	
An Act for the continuation of Expiring Laws.
	21 Vict. No. 17	2 October 1857
An Act to direct the payment of certain monies into the Consolidated Revenue. (Repealed by Public Moneys Act 1890 (54 Vict. No. 1132))
Melbourne and Hobson's Bay Railway Act 1857 (repealed)	21 Vict. No. 18	2 October 1857
An Act to enable the Melbourne and Hobson's Bay Railway Company to raise additional Capital and to extend the provisions of the Acts relating to the Company and for conferring on the Company additional powers in relation to the undertaking and for other purposes. (Repealed by 42 Vict. No. 617)
	21 Vict. No. 19	2 October 1857
An Act for Regulating Juries. (Repealed by Juries Statute 1865 (28 Vict. No. 272))
	21 Vict. No. 20	2 October 1857
An Act for the Confirmation of certain Pensions.
	21 Vict. No. 21	2 October 1857
An Act to Regulate the Importation Carriage and Custody of Gunpowder. (Repealed by Importation and Custody of Gunpowder Statute 1864 (27 Vict. No. 196))
	21 Vict. No. 22	2 October 1857
An Act for the interpretation of Legislative Enactments and for shortening the language used therein.
Church of England Belfast Lands Act 1857	21 Vict. No. 23	2 October 1857
An Act to Amend "An Act to enable the Trustees for the time being of certain portions of the Belfast Church of England Lands in the Colony of Victoria to sell certain portions of the said Lands." (Note: Belfast Church Lands Act 1855 (18 Vict.))
	21 Vict. No. 24	2 October 1857
An Act to provide for the Collection and Payment of the Public Monies the Audit of the Public Accounts and the Protection and Recovery of the Public Property. (Repealed by 22 Vict. No. 86)
	21 Vict. No. 25	24 November 1857
An Act to facilitate Leases and Sales of Settled Estates in the Colony of Victoria. (Repealed by Real Property Statute 1864 (27 Vict. No. 213))
	21 Vict. No. 26	24 November 1857
An Act to enable the Shareholders in a Joint Stock Insurance Company carrying on business in the Colony of Victoria under the name style or title of "The Colonial Insurance Company" to sue and be sued in the name of the Chairman for the time being of the Directors of the said Company and for other purposes.
Ballaarat Gas Company's Act 1857	21 Vict. No. 27	24 November 1857
An Act to incorporate a Company to be called "The Ballaarat Gas Company" and for other purposes.
	21 Vict. No. 28	24 November 1857
An Act to make Powers of Attorney valid in certain cases. (Repealed by Instruments and Securities Statute 1864 (27 Vict. No. 204))
	21 Vict. No. 29	24 November 1857
An Act for the more easy Recovery of certain Debts and Demands. (Repealed by County Courts Statute 1865 (28 Vict. No. 261))
	21 Vict. No. 30	24 November 1857
An Act for making and maintaining a Bridge over the Campaspe River at Echuca.
	21 Vict. No. 31	24 November 1857
An Act to establish a Board of Land and Works. (Repealed by Public Works Statute 1865 (29 Vict. No. 289))
	21 Vict. No. 32	24 November 1857
An Act for amending the Laws relative to the Gold Fields. (Repealed by Mining Statute 1865 (29 Vict. No. 291))
	21 Vict. No. 33	24 November 1857
An Act to extend the right of Voting and to provide for the registration of Parliamentary Electors. (Repealed by Electoral Act 1865 (29 Vict. No. 279))
Australasian Fire and Life Insurance Company's Act 1857	21 Vict. No. 34	24 November 1857
An Act to enable the Shareholders of a Joint Stock Insurance Company established in the Colony of Victoria under the style or title of "The Australasian Fire and Life Insurance Company" to sue and be sued in the name of the Chairman for the time being of the Board of Directors of the said Company and to limit the liability of such Shareholders and for other purposes.
	21 Vict. No. 35	24 November 1857
An Act to authorize the Construction of a Main Trunk Line of Railway from Melbourne to the River Murray and of a Main Trunk Line of Railway from Geelong to Ballaarat. (Repealed by Public Works Statute 1865 (29 Vict. No. 289))
Railway Loan Act 1857 (repealed)	21 Vict. No. 36	24 November 1857
An Act to authorize the raising of Moneys for the Construction of certain Railways. (Repealed by Public Works Statute 1865 (29 Vict. No. 289))
	21 Vict. No. 37	24 November 1857
An Act for preventing the spread of Small-Pox.
Railway Act 1857 (repealed)	21 Vict. No. 38	24 November 1857
An Act for the Construction of Railways. (Repealed by Public Works Statute 1865 (29 Vict. No. 289))
	21 Vict. No. 39	24 November 1857
An Act to correct certain errors in Acts of this Session.
	21 Vict. No. 40	24 November 1857
An Act to provide for the Supervision of Railways. (Repealed by Public Works Statute 1865 (29 Vict. No. 289))
	21 Vict. No. 41	24 November 1857
An Act to regulate the residence of the Chinese Population in Victoria. (Repealed by 22 Vict. No. 80)
St. Kilda and Brighton Railway Act 1857 (repealed)	21 Vict. No. 42	24 November 1857
An Act to authorise the making of the St. Kilda and Brighton Railway. (Repealed by 42 Vict. No. 617)
Melbourne and Suburban Railway Act 1857 (repealed)	21 Vict. No. 43	24 November 1857
An Act for making and maintaining of the Melbourne and Suburban Railway. (Repealed by 42 Vict. No. 617)
	21 Vict. No. 44	24 November 1857
An Act to appropriate the Consolidated Revenue to the service of the year One thousand eight hundred and fifty-seven and for other purposes.

== Sources ==
- "1857 Victorian Historical Acts". AustLII.
