= NDRC =

NDRC may refer to:

- National Development and Reform Commission, central planning agency in the People's Republic of China
- National Defense Research Committee, a government body in the United States created in 1940 for funding scientific research for national security purposes.
- National Digital Research Centre, a research and investment organisation in Dublin, Ireland, created in 2006
- National Democratic Redistricting Committee, a United States Democratic Party political group focused on redistricting

== See also ==
- NRDC (disambiguation)
