= National Research Development Corporation v Commissioner of Patents =

Australian patent law case

- Court: High Court of Australia
- Decided: 6 December 1959
- Citations: [1959] HCA 67, (1959) 102 CLR 252

Court membership
- Judges sitting: Dixon CJ, Kitto and Windeyer JJ

National Research Development Corporation v Commissioner of Patents, also known as the NRDC case, was a significant Australian patent law case, decided in the High Court of Australia on 6 December 1959. The case was important in clarifying what is meant by "manner of manufacture" in respects of patent applications in accordance with the Patents Act 1952 (Cth).

== Facts ==
The National Research Development Corporation (NRDC) discovered a new method to apply known chemicals to the soil so as to kill weeds but not the crops. The chemicals were known to science but were never used in the process of eradicating weeds. NRDC applied for a patent for the new process.

The Commissioner of Patents rejected the application on the grounds that it was not a "manner of manufacture" under section 6 of the Statute of Monopolies because

- the invention was neither a new saleable product nor a new process for producing a saleable product
- the invention involved an agricultural process which could not be a manner of manufacture
- the invention was merely a new use for an existing product

NRDC appealed under s. 49(4) to the Court as the Appeal Tribunal for the purposes of the Act. The case was argued before a Full Court.

The complete specification in the present case contains six claims. Those numbered 4, 5 and 6 are for selective herbicidal compositions, and are not here in question. Claims 1, 2 and 3 are in these terms:

1. A method for eradicating weeds from crop areas containing a growing crop selected from leguminous fodder crops of the genera Trifolium and Medicago, celery and parsnip.
2. A method for the control of weeds of the type of charlock, creeping thistle and annual nettle in a lucerne (alfalfa) crop.
3. A method for the control of weeds of the type of charlock, creeping thistle and annual nettle in a clover crop.

The Commissioner did not consider the new process a manner of manufacture and argued that the definition of invention is restricted to vendible products and processes for their production, and excludes all agricultural and horticultural processes.

The appellant (NRDC), argued that the new process can be considered a "manner of manufacture" subject to the definition in the Patents Act 1990 and grant of privilege under s. 6 of the Statute of Monopolies if a process produces, either immediately or ultimately, an economically useful result.

== Issues ==
The issue for the court was to determine if this new process of weed-killing constituted a "manner of manufacture" and could therefore be considered a patentable invention.

The court had to consider whether it is enough that a process produces a useful result or whether it is necessary that some physical thing is either brought into existence or so affected as the better to serve man's purposes.

== Legal issues considered ==
- NRDC brought the appeal under section 49 of the Patents Act 1952 which sets out the ground for acceptance of a patent request.
- The definition of "manner of manufacture" was contained within section 6 of the Statute of Monopolies
- Section 6 Patents Act 1952; definition of "patent" as a "letters patent for an invention".
- The Deputy Commissioner, and on the authority of Re Application by Standard Oil Development Co, decided, in respect of each of the three claims, that the method claimed was not a manner of manufacture, his reason being that it did not result in any vendible product.
- Commissioner of Patents v Microcell Ltd, the Commissioner alleged that NRDC's new process was merely a new use for an existing product pursuant to the precedent set in this case
- G.E.C.'s Application, a test for assessing whether a method or process is a manner of manufacture was formulated in this case. It was held that a method or process is a manner of manufacture if it

(a) results in the production of some vendible product or
(b) improves or restores to its former condition a vendible product or
(c) has the effect of preserving from deterioration some vendible product to which it is applied

The outcome of the NRDC case, reduced these rules to guidelines and the notion of "vendible" and "product" should be given a broad interpretation, pursuant to the broad interpretation of "manner of manufacture" in section 6 of the Statute of Monopolies.

== Decision ==
(i) Processes may be patented provided that it produces a material advantage and has a new and useful effect that produces a physical product.

(ii) NRDC's new process made use of existing chemicals that had never been used in eradicating weeds. A new use of a known substance is patentable provided the use takes advantage of a previously unknown property. That is it must be used in a way that it has never been used or thought to use previously. Therefore, in this case, it is the process not the article that constitutes the invention.

(iii) The outcome of this new process was only arrived at by scientific ingenuity and research and is considered a vendible product because it created an artificial state of affairs in respect of weeds and crops and achieved an economically useful result.

(iv) Agricultural and horticultural processes are not outside the limits of patentable inventions provided they are not excluded by any other of the "traditional principles" as in the case of NV Philips Gloeilampenfabrieken v Mirabella International Pty Ltd, and the new agricultural and horticultural processes produce a new and useful product.
