= Australian patent law =

Australian patent law is law governing the granting of a temporary monopoly on the use of an invention, in exchange for the publication and free use of the invention after a certain time. The primary piece of legislation is the Patents Act 1990. Patents are administered by the Commonwealth Government agency IP Australia. Australia is a member state of the World Intellectual Property Organization, and compliant with Agreement on Trade-Related Aspects of Intellectual Property Rights. This makes Australian patent law broadly comparable with patent law in other major countries.

== Key features ==
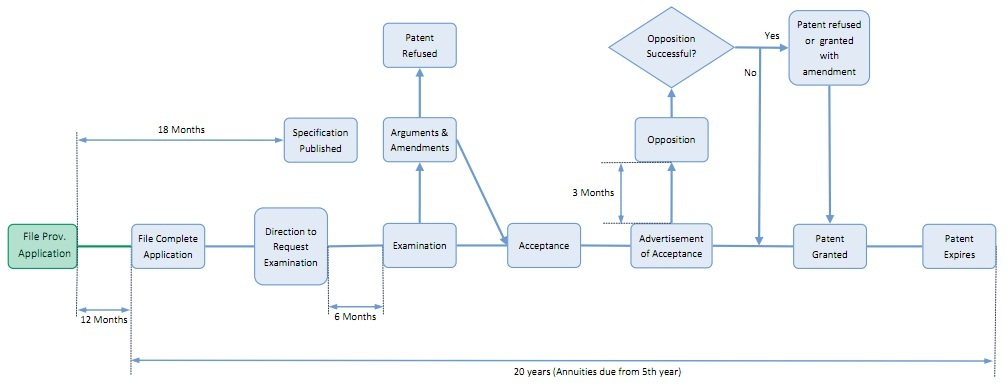
Standard Australian patent procedure

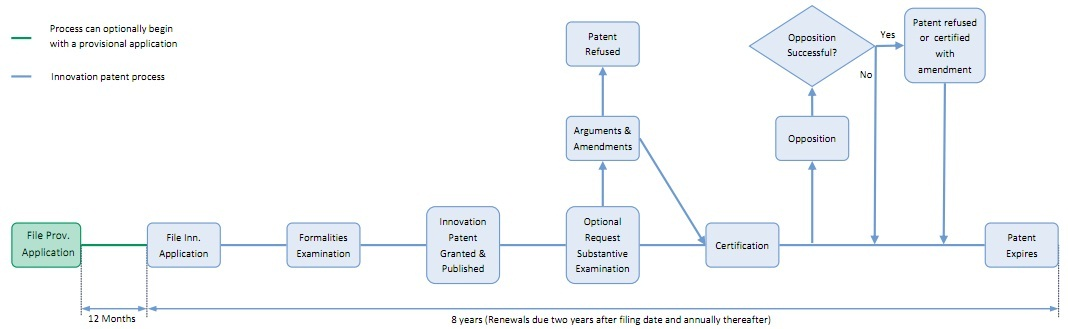
Australian innovation patent procedure

Until August 2021, Australia had two kinds of patents available:

- a standard patent with a term of 20 years and
- an innovation patent, which offered a lower threshold for inventiveness, and a maximum term of 8 years. However, in 2020, the Australian government began phasing them out and the last date for filing an innovation patent in Australia was 25 August 2021.

Innovation patents had a faster approval process and lower fees.

Australia operates a first to file system, like much of the rest of the world.

== Australian patent databases ==
The AusPat Patent database is the official Australian patents database operated by the Australian Intellectual Property Office. AusPat records patents dating back to 1904.

== History ==
=== Pre-Federation ===
The system of granting patents in the six Australian colonies was based upon British law, and can be traced back to the English Statute of Monopolies of 1623. This was enacted in 1624. Prior to the colonies enacting their own legislation in the mid-19th century and forming their own patent offices, inventors applied to England for patent registration and protection.

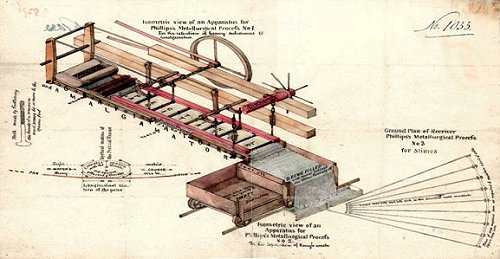
Victorian patent 1033 (1867)

When legislatures were established in the Australian colonies, people could apply (petition the parliament) for a patent to be granted by the governor of the colony, by way of a private bill. The first of these was South Australian Private Act No.1 of 1848, granted to Andrew John Murray of Adelaide for "An improved windlass", on 20 June 1848, for a period of 10 years. A further three private acts were granted in South Australia; and several were granted in Western Australia.

The first general patent act in Australia was introduced into New South Wales in 1852 and came into force on 10 January 1854. Victoria proclaimed its first Patent Act, the act 17 Vict. No. 15, in 1854, with the length of the grant being for 14 years.

=== Post-Federation ===
Section 51(xviii) of the Constitution of Australia gave the new federal parliament the right to legislate with regard to "copyrights, patents of invention and designs, and trade marks". The first federal legislation dealing with patents was the Patents Act 1903, passed by the first Deakin Government. The act transferred the administration of the state patents acts to the federal government with effect from 1 June 1904, and established the Australian Patent Office (APO). The first patent was filed with the office on 13 February 1904. The APO is the direct predecessor of IP Australia, the current Australian government agency responsible for patents. The original 1903 act has been replaced on two occasions – the Menzies Government's Patents Act 1952 and the Hawke government's Patents Act 1990.

== See also ==
- History of patent law
- Australian property law
- National Research Development Corporation v Commissioner of Patents (1959) 102 CLR 252
