= Politics of Tasmania =

Overview of politics in Tasmania

The politics of Tasmania takes place in context of a bicameral parliamentary system. The main parties are the Liberal and the Labor Party. Other minor political parties include the Greens and One Nation along with several independent politicians.

The executive government (called the Tasmanian Government) comprises 8 portfolios, led by a ministerial department and supported by several agencies. There are also a number of independent agencies that fall under a portfolio but remain at arms-length for political reasons, such as the Integrity Commission and Electoral Commission. The state Executive Council, consisting of the governor and senior ministers, exercises the executive authority through the relevant portfolio.

The legislative branch includes the bicameral state parliament, which includes the monarchy as represented by the governor, the House of Assembly, and Legislative Council. The judicial branch consists of three general courts (Magistrates', and Supreme Court), and several specialist courts such as the Coroner's Court.

Tasmania received statehood upon the federation of Australia in 1901, with the state's Constitution establishing a parliamentary democracy. Its relationship with the federal government is regulated by the Australian Constitution. The current government is held by the state Liberal Party, led by Premier Jeremy Rockliff. Rockliff succeeded Peter Gutwein of the Liberal Party on 8 April 2022 following the 2022 Tasmanian Liberal Party leadership election.

== State politics ==
=== Parliament of Tasmania ===
The Australian state of Tasmania has a bicameral parliament. The House of Assembly (lower house) is composed of 35 members of parliament, where each electorate is represented by 7 members. The voting system is preferential. The Legislative Council (upper house) comprises 15 members, who each serve terms of 5 years and are elected in groups of 3 per year. The King is represented by the governor, who formally appoints the premier, as nominated by the majority party in the Assembly.

=== Office holders ===
The formal chief executive of Tasmania is the governor, who is appointed as the King's representative on the advice of the head of the governing party. The current governor is Barbara Baker. The governor holds limited reserve powers, but with few exceptions is required by convention to act on the advice of the government.

The Premier of Tasmania is currently Jeremy Rockliff of the Liberal Party. The 47th Premier, Rockliff assumed office on 21 March 2022. The Deputy Premier of Tasmania is Guy Barnett.

Officially opposing the Tasmanian government is the opposition Labor Party.

The government is decided every four years by election. The most recent election was held in 2022, with the next in 2025.

=== Political parties ===
Tasmania is currently governed by the Liberal Party. The two main parties are the Liberal Party, and the Labor Party. Other currently elected parties in Tasmanian politics include the Greens, and One Nation, along with multiple independents.

== Political structure ==
Tasmania is governed according to the principles of the Westminster system, a form of parliamentary government based on the model of the United Kingdom. Legislative power formally rests with the King, acting with the advice and consent of the House of Assembly and Legislative Council—together known as the Parliament of Tasmania. Executive power is exercised by the Executive Council, which consists of the Governor and senior ministers.

The Governor, as representative of the Crown, is the formal repository of power, which is exercised by him or her on the advice of the Premier of Tasmania and the cabinet. The Premier and ministers are appointed by the Governor, and hold office by virtue of their ability to command the support of a majority of members of the House of Assembly. Judicial power is exercised by the Supreme Court of Tasmania and a system of subordinate courts, but the High Court of Australia and other federal courts have overriding jurisdiction on matters which fall under the ambit of the Australian Constitution.

== State party support by region ==
=== Liberal ===
Northwest Tasmania is considered to be a heartland of the state Liberal Party.

== Federal politics ==
Tasmania has 5 seats in the Australian House of Representatives, the least of any state.

=== Party support by region ===
==== Liberals ====
There is no seat that is considered to be a safe Liberal seat.

==== Labor ====
Franklin is traditionally considered to be a safe Labor seat.

==== Marginal seats ====
Lyons, Bass, Braddon are considered to be marginal seats.

== Referendum results in Tasmania ==
As of 2024, the most recent state referendum in Tasmania was in 1981.

=== Results of referendums ===
Year	No.	Name	National Voters	States	Tas
1906	1	Senate Elections	82.65%	6:0	81.32%
1910	2	State Debts	54.95%	5:1	59.99%
1910	3	Surplus Revenue	49.04%	3:3	80.97%
1911	4	Trade and Commerce	39.42%	1:5	42.11%
1911	5	Monopolies	39.89%	1:5	42.43%
1913	6	Trade and Commerce	49.38%	3:3	45.16%
1913	7	Corporations	49.33%	3:3	45.08%
1913	8	Industrial Matters	49.33%	3:3	45.01%
1913	9	Trusts	49.78%	3:3	45.38%
1913	10	Monopolies	49.33%	3:3	46.85%
1913	11	Railway Disputes	49.13%	3:3	51.26%
1919	12	Legislative Powers	49.65%	3:3	34.08%
1919	13	Monopolies	48.64%	3:3	33.43%
1926	14	Industry and Commerce	43.50%	2:4	44.86%
1926	15	Essential Services	42.80%	2:4	48.59%
1928	16	State Debts	74.30%	6:0	66.89%
1937	17	Aviation	53.56%	2:4	38.94%
1937	18	Marketing	36.26%	0:6	21.88%
1944	19	Post-War Reconstruction and Democratic Rights	45.99%	2:4	38.92%
1946	20	Social Services	54.39%	6:0	50.58%
1946	21	Marketing	48.74%	3:3	42.55%
1946	22	Industrial Employment	50.30%	3:3	48.20%
1948	23	Rents and Prices	40.66%	0:6	35.45%
1951	24	Communists and Communism	49.44%	3:3	50.26%
1967	25	Parliament	40.25%	1:5	33.91%
1967	26	Aboriginals	90.77%	6:0	90.21%
1973	27	Prices	43.81%	0:6	38.22%
1973	28	Incomes	34.42%	0:6	28.31%
1974	29	Simultaneous Elections	47.14%	1:5	65.99%
1974	30	Mode of Altering the Constitution	47.99%	1:5	40.72%
1974	31	Democratic Elections	47.20%	1:5	40.81%
1974	32	Local Government Bodies	46.85%	1:5	42.52%
1977	33	Simultaneous Elections	62.22%	3:3	34.26%
1977	34	Senate Casual Vacancies	73.32%	6:0	53.78%
1977	35	Referendums	77.72%	6:0	62.25%
1977	36	Retirement of Judges	80.10%	6:0	72.46%
1984	37	Terms of Senators	50.64%	2:4	39.29%
1984	38	Interchange of Powers	47.06%	0:6	34.65%
1988	39	Parliamentary Terms	32.92%	0:6	25.34%
1988	40	Fair Elections	37.60%	0:6	28.89%
1988	41	Local Government	33.62%	0:6	27.50%
1988	42	Rights and Freedoms	30.79%	0:6	25.49%
1999	43	Establishment of Republic	45.13%	0:6	40.37%
1999	44	Preamble	39.34%	0:6	35.67%
2023	45	Aboriginal and Torres Strait Islander Voice	39.94%	0:6	41.04%

== Notable Tasmanian political figures ==
- Robert Cosgrove, 30th premier of Tasmania, longest-serving premier (1939–1947, 1948–1958)
- Jacqui Lambie, Senator for Tasmania from (2014–2017, and since 2019)
- Bob Brown, Senator for Tasmania and founder of the Australian Greens.
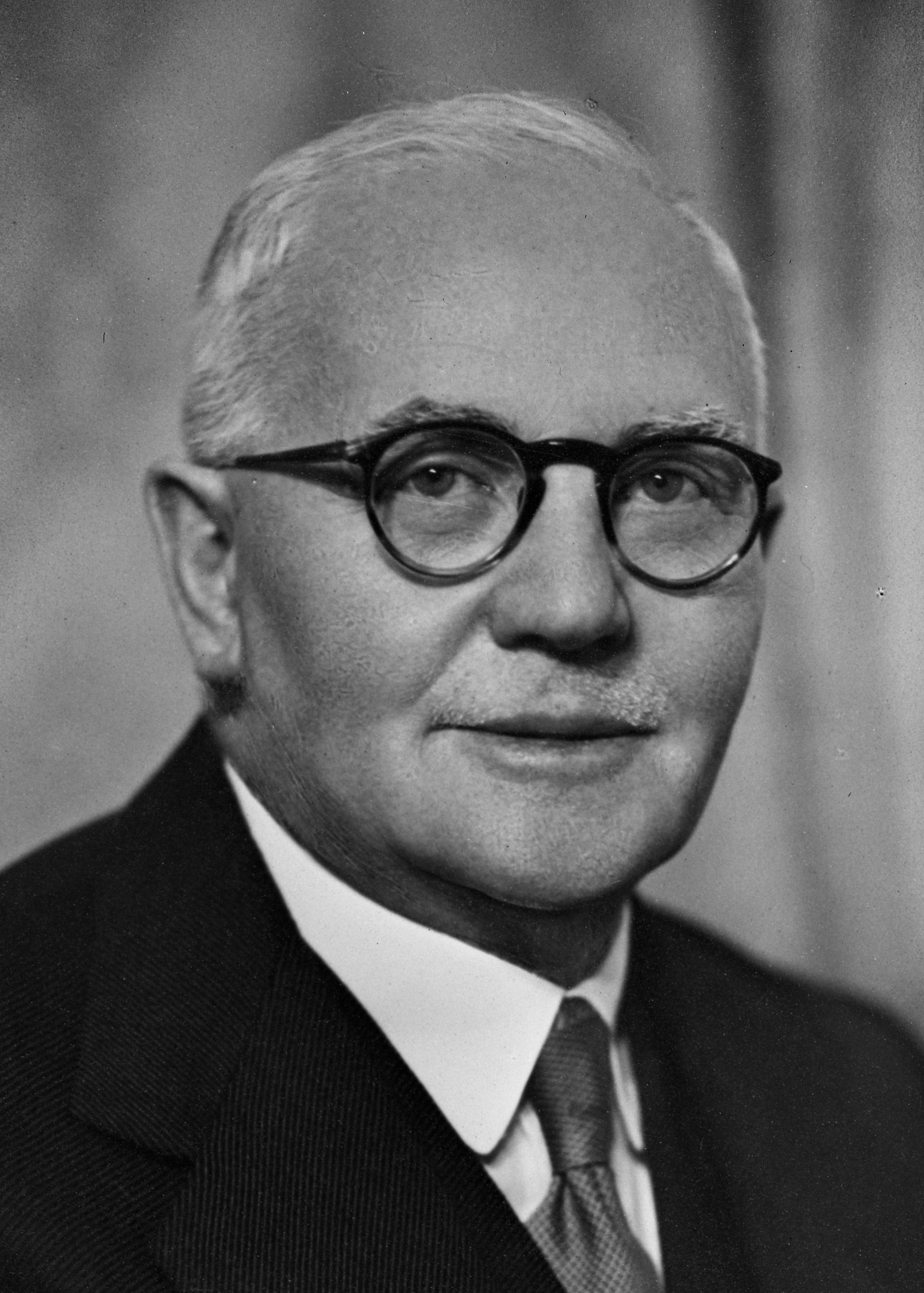
Robert Cosgrove

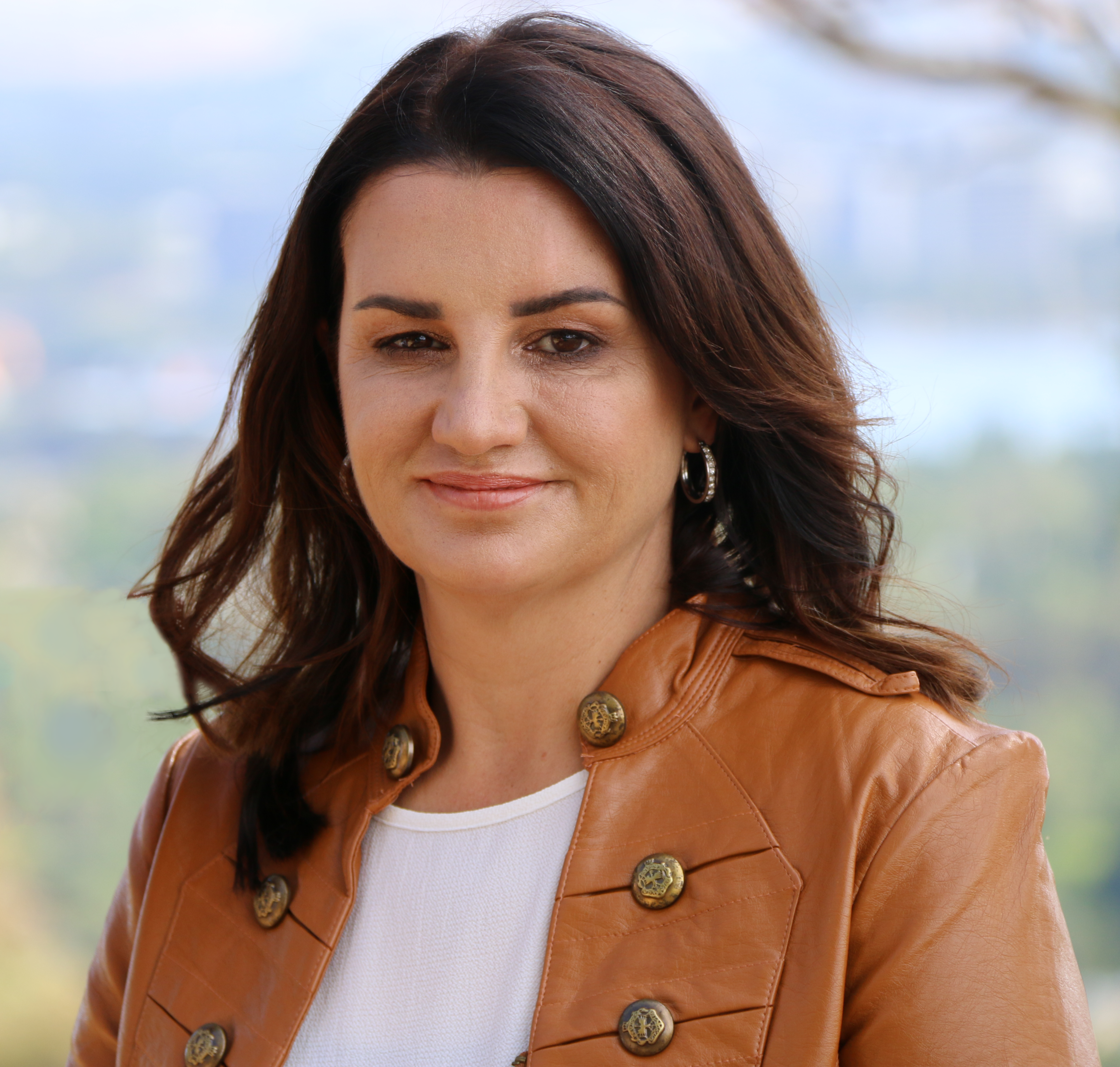
Jacqui Lambie

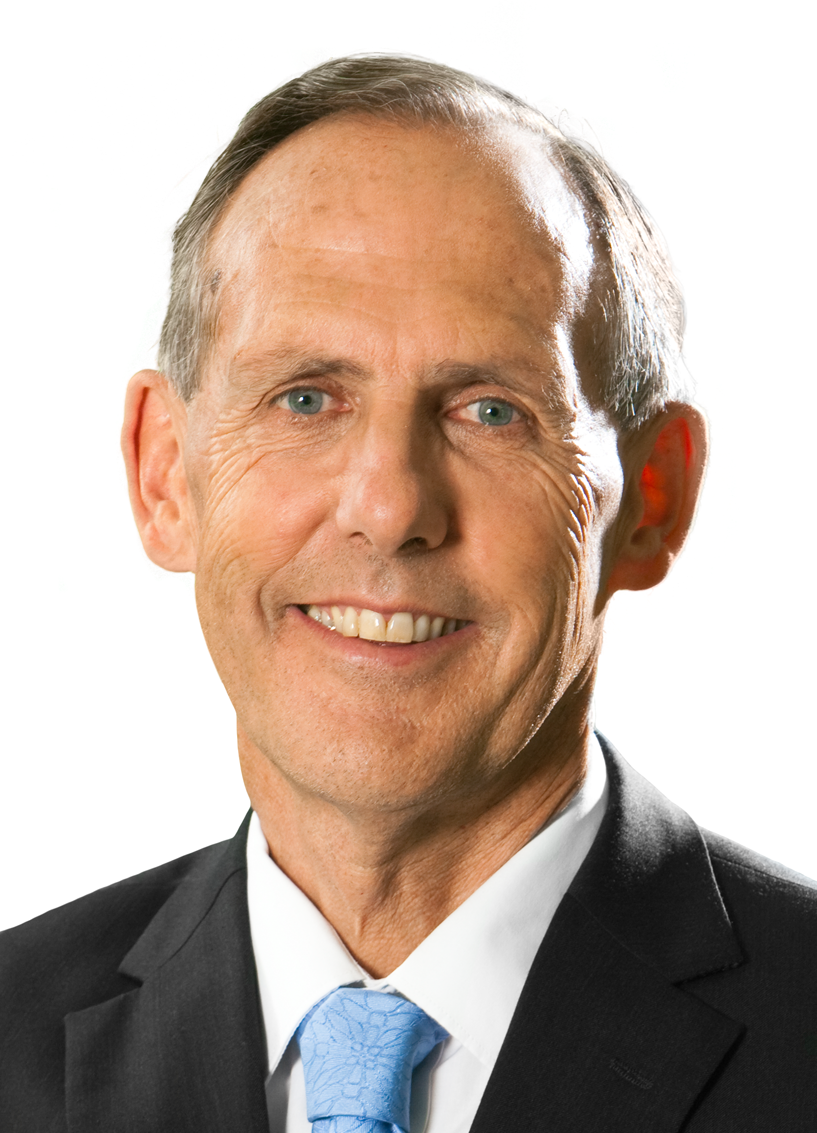
Bob Brown

== Recent state election results ==
	Primary vote		
	ALP	LPA	Oth.
2002 Tasmanian state election	51.88%	27.38%	20.74%
2006 Tasmanian state election	49.27%	31.82%	18.92%
2010 Tasmanian state election	36.88%	38.99%	24.14%
2014 Tasmanian state election	27.33%	51.22%	21.45%
2018 Tasmanian state election	32.63%	50.26%	17.11%
2021 Tasmanian state election	28.20%	48.72%	23.09%
2024 Tasmanian state election	29.00%	36.67%	34.32%
2025 Tasmanian state election	25.87%	39.87%	34.27%

== See also ==
- Premiers of Tasmania
- Governors of Tasmania
- Electoral results for the Australian Senate in Tasmania
