= Politics of New South Wales =

The politics of New South Wales takes place in the context of a bicameral parliamentary system. The main parties are the Liberal and National parties of the Coalition, and the Labor Party. Other minor political parties include the Greens, Shooters, Fishers and Farmers Party, One Nation, and the Libertarian Party, along with several independent politicians.

The executive government (called the NSW Government) comprises 11 portfolios, led by a ministerial department and supported by several agencies. There are also a number of independent agencies that fall under a portfolio but remain at arm's length for political reasons, such as the Independent Commission Against Corruption and Electoral Commission. The state Executive Council, consisting of the governor and senior ministers, exercises the executive authority through the relevant portfolio.

The legislative branch includes the bicameral state parliament, which includes the monarchy as represented by the governor, the Legislative Assembly, and Legislative Council. The judicial branch consists of three general courts (Local, District and Supreme Court), and several specialist courts such as the Children's Court or Coroner's Court.

New South Wales received statehood upon the federation of Australia in 1901, with the state's Constitution establishing a parliamentary democracy. Its relationship with the federal government is regulated by the Australian Constitution. The current government is held by the state Labor Party, led by Premier Chris Minns. Minns succeeded Dominic Perrottet from the Liberal Party on 28 March 2023 following the state election.

The New South Wales Legislative Assembly (lower house where government is formed) is sometimes referred to informally as "the bear pit", as a mark of perceived unruly behaviour within the parliamentary chambers, and 'Macquarie Street', a metonym of the street of that name where Parliament House is located, in Sydney's CBD.

== State politics ==
=== Parliament of New South Wales ===
The Australian state of New South Wales has a bicameral parliament. The Legislative Assembly (lower house) is composed of 93 members of parliament, each of whom represents a single electorate. The voting system is preferential. Until the mid-1990s, members of the Assembly served for up to four years, until the Greiner government made terms a fixed length of four years. The Legislative Council (upper house) comprises 42 members, who serve terms of 8 years. The King is represented by the governor, who formally appoints the premier, as nominated by the majority party in the Assembly.

=== Office holders ===
The formal chief executive of New South Wales is the governor, who is appointed as the King's representative on the advice of the head of the governing party. The current governor is Margaret Beazley. The governor holds limited reserve powers, but with few exceptions is required by convention to act on the advice of the government.

The Premier of New South Wales is currently Chris Minns of the Labor Party. The 47th Premier, Minns assumed office on 28 March 2023. The Deputy Premier of New South Wales is Prue Car.

Officially opposing the New South Wales government is the opposition Liberal–National Coalition

The government is decided every four years by election. The most recent election was held in 2023, with the next in 2027.

=== Political parties ===
New South Wales is currently governed by the Labor Party. The two main parties are the Liberal Party/National Party Coalition, and the Labor Party. Other currently elected parties in New South Wales politics include the Greens, the Shooters, Fishers and Farmers Party, the Animal Justice Party, One Nation, and the Libertarian Party, along with multiple independents.

== Political structure ==
New South Wales is governed according to the principles of the Westminster system, a form of parliamentary government based on the model of the United Kingdom. Legislative power formally rests with the King, acting with the advice and consent of the Legislative Council and Legislative Assembly—together known as the Parliament of New South Wales. Executive power is exercised by the Executive Council, which consists of the Governor and senior ministers.

The Governor, as representative of the Crown, is the formal repository of power, which is exercised by him or her on the advice of the Premier of New South Wales and the cabinet. The Premier and ministers are appointed by the Governor, and hold office by virtue of their ability to command the support of a majority of members of the Legislative Assembly. Judicial power is exercised by the Supreme Court of New South Wales and a system of subordinate courts, but the High Court of Australia and other federal courts have overriding jurisdiction on matters which fall under the ambit of the Australian Constitution.

In 2006, the sesquicentenary of responsible government in New South Wales, the Constitution Amendment (Pledge of Loyalty) Act 2006 No. 6 was enacted to amend the Constitution Act 1902 to require members of the New South Wales Parliament and its Ministers to take a pledge of loyalty to Australia and to the people of New South Wales instead of swearing allegiance to the Queen, her heirs and successors, and to revise the oaths taken by Executive Councillors. The Act was assented to by the Queen on 3 April 2006.

On 5 June 2012, the Constitution Amendment (Restoration of Oaths of Allegiance) Act 2012 No 33 was assented to and made a further amendment to the Constitution Act 1902, by restoring the option of taking the oath of allegiance to the Queen, her heirs and successors, in addition to the option of taking the pledge of loyalty. The change applies to members of Legislative Council, Legislative Assembly and Executive Council.

== State party support by region ==
=== Liberal ===
The Liberals strongest base has always been on the North Shore and Northern Beaches as well as the Hills and Forest districts, creating a 'bloc' on the northern side of Sydney Harbour. The last time the Labor party won an electorate wholly within any of these districts was the electorates of Manly, Wakehurst and Willoughby in the 1978 'Wranslide' election. The electoral districts of North Shore and the single Liberal held electorate of Vaucluse in the Eastern Suburbs are the most affluent areas in the state and have never been lost to the Labor party. In recent decades, the Liberals have consistently held the regional electorates of Albury and Goulburn.

=== Nationals ===
The Nationals (formerly the Country Party) are a party representing country issues and farmers and only generally seek to represent rural and regional electorates. They are ideologically conservative and sit on the centre-right of the political spectrum. Their strongest base within the state has always been the New England, Northern Tablelands, Northern Rivers, Mid North Coast, Riverina and the Central West. The Nationals biggest competitors are the Shooters, Fishers and Farmers and well as local independents from time to time. When there is no incumbent, it is not uncommon for the Liberals to run candidates against the Nationals creating three cornered contests in semi-rural electorates such as Cessnock, Monaro, Goulburn and Wagga Wagga.

=== Labor ===
Labor was traditionally strongest in the Inner West, Western Sydney and South Western Sydney; however, their status has diminished since the late 2000s in the Inner West with the rise of the left-wing Greens in the electorates of Balmain and Newtown. Labor's significant majorities and continual hold-outs with its highest two-party preferred votes are in the electorates with the highest concentration of lower socioeconomic groups such as Mount Druitt, Blacktown and Canterbury. Labor are equally unchallenged in the electorates with known ethnic enclaves such as Lakemba, Cabramatta, Bankstown and Fairfield respectively.

Outside metropolitan Sydney, Labor have consistently recorded majorities in the regions of the Hunter and Central Coast with the Coalition holding only a single electorate in each without interruption, being: Upper Hunter and Terrigal. Labor generally performs well in the Illawarra and in the Far West mining town of Broken Hill.

=== Greens ===
The Greens have solidified support within the Inner West city region of metropolitan Sydney at the expense of Labor. There has been little to no opposition from the Liberals or their predecessors in seats where left-wing candidates have always won by substantial margins such as the current Balmain and Newtown and the former related seats such as Leichhardt, Phillip, Elizabeth, Rozelle and Port Jackson. With the loss of these reliable seats, this creates a harder task for Labor to form majority government into the future. The Greens have seen localised success in the Northern Rivers seat of Ballina which entirely encompasses the Byron Bay district.

=== 'Blue Ribbon' and 'Hard Labor' electorates ===
The following lists current electorates where the opposing party (Liberal/National versus Labor/Greens) have never won each seat or its direct predecessor following a redistribution or since the abolition of proportional representation of the lower house in 1927:

Labor

- Auburn
- Bankstown
- Canterbury
- Fairfield
- Keira
- Maroubra
- Mount Druitt
- Shellharbour
- Summer Hill
- Wallsend
- Wollongong

Liberal

- Castle Hill
- Davidson
- Epping
- Hornsby
- Kellyville
- Lane Cove
- North Shore
- Terrigal
- Vaucluse
- Wahroonga

Nationals

- Clarence
- Coffs Harbour
- Myall Lakes
- Oxley
- Cootamundra

=== Marginal seats ===
For governments to change hands, generally there is a quantity of marginal electorates that determine the result of the election which sustain the most attention from the major parties. In New South Wales, most of these electorates are located in Western Sydney and surrounds and generally after redistribution by the New South Wales Electoral Commission they remain marginal or ± 5% of the previous margin. In the case of electorates that more than often side with the incoming or continuing government, known as a bellwether, the electorate of Monaro holds the record for all but two (1995 and 1999) elections since 1932 in having sided with the government of the day. Other common bellwethers being Oatley (formerly Georges River) and Ryde (formerly Gladesville and Fuller). Other electorates that often change hands between the major parties include: Drummoyne, Gosford, Heathcote, Holsworthy, Parramatta and Penrith.

== Federal politics ==
New South Wales has 47 seats in the Australian House of Representatives, the most of any state. As such, it is nearly impossible to win government without a strong base in New South Wales, while a decent showing in New South Wales can usually make up for a poor night elsewhere. Labor has never won an election without winning a majority in New South Wales.

The 1996 federal election was an example of how critical New South Wales is in federal elections. The election turned into a Coalition rout in large part due to Labor losing 13 of its 33 seats in New South Wales.

=== Liberals ===
Like at the state level, the federal party draws most of its continuous support from north-west Sydney and the surrounds of the Hawkesbury River. However this has eroded in recent elections with the rise of the Teal independents. Only the divisions of Mitchell and Berowra remain with the Liberal Party north of Sydney Harbour. The Party also has strong bases in Southern Sydney and Southern NSW, having continuously held the divisions of Cook, Farrer and Hume for several decades. The party lost its traditional harbour-side base of seats including North Sydney, Warringah, Bradfield, Mackellar and Wentworth to the teal movement between 2018 and 2025.

=== Labor ===
Unlike with state results, Labor has consistently maintained dominance over the Greens in the Inner West and the Liberals through the bulk of the Western Sydney basin to the Blue Mountains. The only inner-metropolitan Sydney seat that changes between Labor and Liberal is the division of Reid (formerly Lowe) which is currently held by Labor as of 2022. Labor dominate the Hunter, Illawarra and South Coast regions, as of 2022 holding every seat. However, the divisions of Dobell, Gilmore, Hunter and Paterson are considered winnable seats for the Liberals in each region. The Central Coast seat of Robertson is the longest-continuous bellwether in the country.

== Referendum results in NSW ==
As of 2024, the most recent state referendum in New South Wales was in 1995.

=== Results of referendums ===
Year	No.	Name	National Voters	States	NSW
1906	1	Senate Elections	82.65%	6:0	83.85%
1910	2	State Debts	54.95%	5:1	33.34%
1910	3	Surplus Revenue	49.04%	3:3	47.35%
1911	4	Trade and Commerce	39.42%	1:5	36.11%
1911	5	Monopolies	39.89%	1:5	36.72%
1913	6	Trade and Commerce	49.38%	3:3	46.93%
1913	7	Corporations	49.33%	3:3	46.79%
1913	8	Industrial Matters	49.33%	3:3	46.88%
1913	9	Trusts	49.78%	3:3	47.12%
1913	10	Monopolies	49.33%	3:3	46.85%
1913	11	Railway Disputes	49.13%	3:3	46.70%
1919	12	Legislative Powers	49.65%	3:3	39.95%
1919	13	Monopolies	48.64%	3:3	38.31%
1926	14	Industry and Commerce	43.50%	2:4	51.53%
1926	15	Essential Services	42.80%	2:4	50.39%
1928	16	State Debts	74.30%	6:0	64.47%
1937	17	Aviation	53.56%	2:4	47.25%
1937	18	Marketing	36.26%	0:6	33.76%
1944	19	Post-War Reconstruction and Democratic Rights	45.99%	2:4	45.44%
1946	20	Social Services	54.39%	6:0	54.00%
1946	21	Marketing	50.57%	3:3	51.83%
1946	22	Industrial Employment	50.30%	3:3	51.72%
1948	23	Rents and Prices	40.66%	0:6	41.66%
1951	24	Communists and Communism	49.44%	3:3	47.17%
1967	25	Parliament	40.25%	1:5	51.01%
1967	26	Aboriginals	90.77%	6:0	91.46%
1973	27	Prices	43.81%	0:6	48.55%
1973	28	Incomes	34.42%	0:6	40.31%
1974	29	Simultaneous Elections	48.30%	1:5	51.06%
1974	30	Mode of Altering the Constitution	47.99%	1:5	51.35%
1974	31	Democratic Elections	47.20%	1:5	50.55%
1974	32	Local Government Bodies	46.85%	1:5	50.79%
1977	33	Simultaneous Elections	62.22%	3:3	70.71%
1977	34	Senate Casual Vacancies	73.32%	6:0	81.62%
1977	35	Referendums	77.72%	6:0	83.92%
1977	36	Retirement of Judges	80.10%	6:0	84.84%
1984	37	Terms of Senators	50.64%	2:4	52.86%
1984	38	Interchange of Powers	47.06%	0:6	49.04%
1988	39	Parliamentary Terms	32.92%	0:6	31.66%
1988	40	Fair Elections	37.60%	0:6	35.57%
1988	41	Local Government	33.62%	0:6	31.70%
1988	42	Rights and Freedoms	30.79%	0:6	29.65%
1999	43	Establishment of Republic	45.13%	0:6	46.43%
1999	44	Preamble	39.34%	0:6	42.14%
2023	45	Aboriginal and Torres Strait Islander Voice	39.94%	0:6	41.04%

== Notable New South Wales political figures ==
- Henry Parkes, 6th premier of New South Wales, longest-serving premier, regarded as the Father of Australian Federation
- Jack Lang, 23rd premier. Dismissed by the governor in 1932.
- Sir Robert Askin, 32nd premier, notable for his long tenure in office and corrupt behaviour.
- Nick Greiner, 37th premier. Widespread reforms and turbulent premiership.
- Bob Carr, 39th premier. Longest continual premiership and continued electoral success.
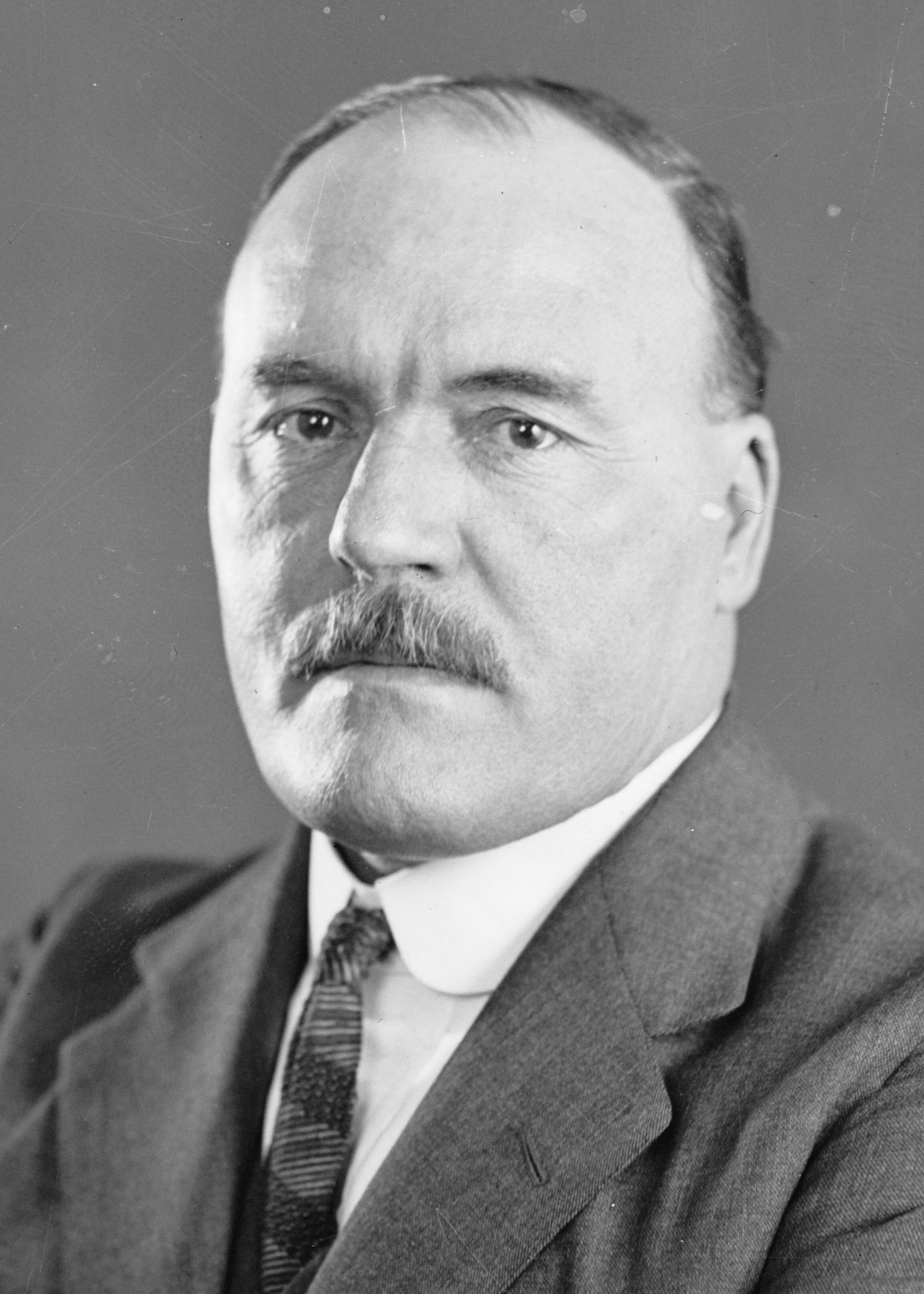
Jack Lang

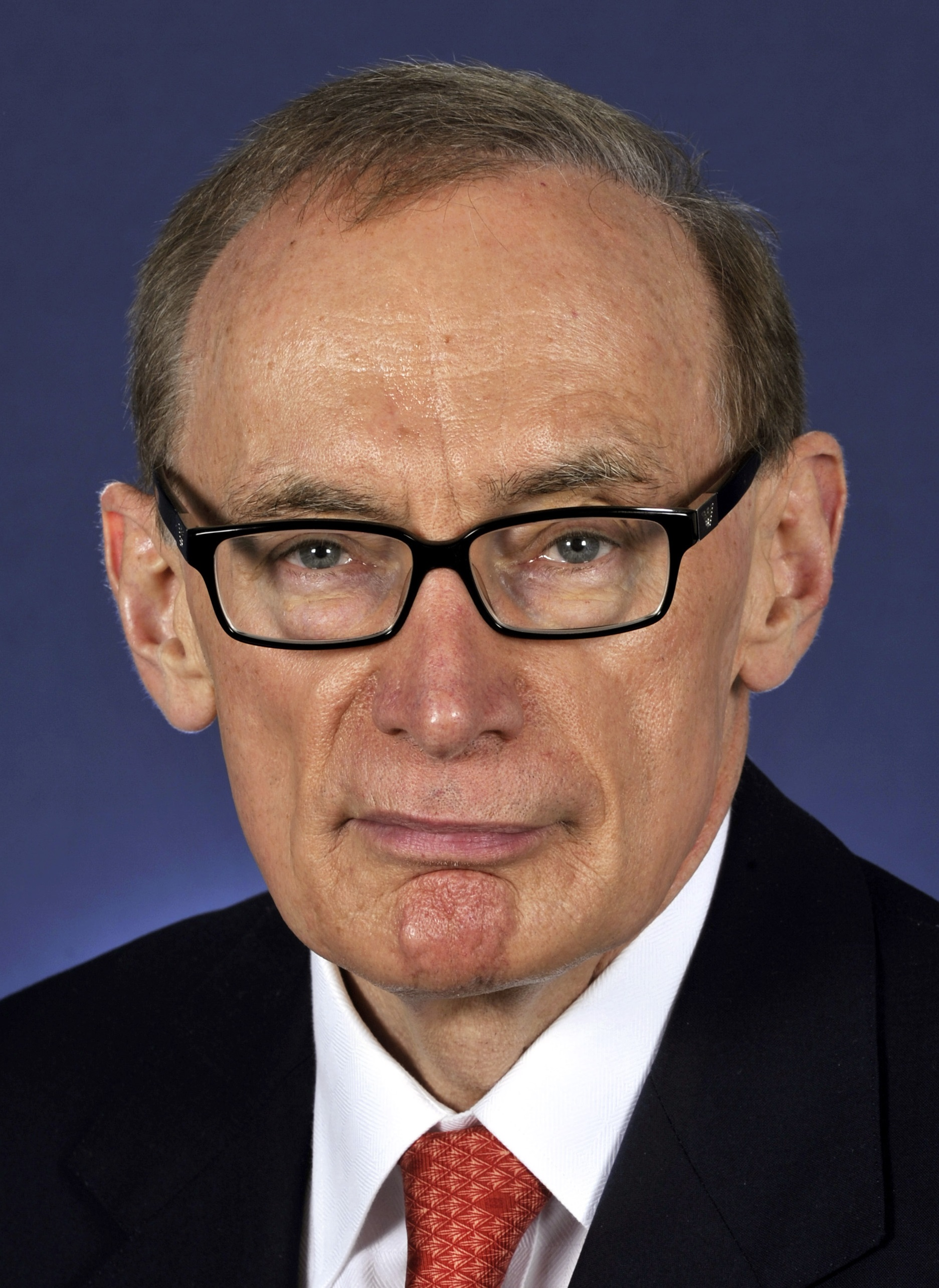
Bob Carr

== Recent state election results ==
	Primary vote		
	ALP	L+NP	Oth.
1999 New South Wales state election	42.21%	33.69%	24.1%
2003 New South Wales state election	42.68%	34.35%	22.98%
2007 New South Wales state election	38.87%	36.88%	24.26%
2011 New South Wales state election	25.55%	51.15%	22.93%
2015 New South Wales state election	34.08%	45.63%	20.29%
2019 New South Wales state election	33.31%	41.58%	25.11%
2023 New South Wales state election	36.97%	35.37%	27.68%

== See also ==
- Premiers of New South Wales
- Governors of New South Wales
- List of New South Wales state elections
- Electoral results for the Australian Senate in New South Wales
