= Politics of South Australia =

Overview of politics in South Australia

The politics of South Australia takes place in context of a bicameral parliamentary system. The main parties are the Liberal and the Labor Party. Minor political parties include the National Party, the Greens, SA Best and One Nation along with several independent politicians.

The executive government (called the South Australian Government) comprises 14 portfolios, led by a ministerial department and supported by several agencies. There are also a number of independent agencies that fall under a portfolio but remain at arms-length for political reasons, such as the Independent Commission Against Corruption and Electoral Commission. The state Executive Council, consisting of the governor and senior ministers, exercises the executive authority through the relevant portfolio.

The legislative branch includes the bicameral state parliament, which includes the monarchy as represented by the governor, the House of Assembly, and Legislative Council. The judicial branch consists of three general courts (Magistrates', District and Supreme Court), and several specialist courts such as the Coroner's Court.

South Australia received statehood upon the federation of Australia in 1901, with the state's Constitution establishing a parliamentary democracy. Its relationship with the federal government is regulated by the Australian Constitution. The current government is held by the state Labor Party, led by Premier Peter Malinauskas. Malinauskas succeeded Steven Marshall from the Liberal Party on 21 March 2022 following the state election.

== State politics ==
=== Parliament of South Australia ===
The Australian state of South Australia has a bicameral parliament. The House of Assembly (lower house) is composed of 57 members of parliament, each of whom represents a single electorate. The voting system is preferential. The Legislative Council (upper house) comprises 22 members, who serve terms of 8 years. The King is represented by the governor, who formally appoints the premier, as nominated by the majority party in the Assembly.

=== Office holders ===
The formal chief executive of South Australia is the governor, who is appointed as the King's representative on the advice of the head of the governing party. The current governor is Frances Adamson. The governor holds limited reserve powers, but with few exceptions is required by convention to act on the advice of the government.

The Premier of South Australia is currently Peter Malinauskas of the Labor Party. The 33rd Premier, Malinauskas assumed office on 21 March 2022. The Deputy Premier of South Australia is Kyam Maher.

Officially opposing the South Australian government is the opposition South Australian Liberal Party.

The government is decided every four years by election. The most recent election was held in 2026, with the next in 2030.

=== Political parties ===
South Australia is currently governed by the Labor Party. The two main parties are the Liberal Party, and the Labor Party. Other currently elected parties in South Australian politics include the Greens, and One Nation along with multiple independents.

== Political structure ==
South Australia is governed according to the principles of the Westminster system, a form of parliamentary government based on the model of the United Kingdom. Legislative power formally rests with the King, acting with the advice and consent of the House of Assembly and Legislative Council—together known as the Parliament of South Australia. Executive power is exercised by the Executive Council, which consists of the Governor and senior ministers.

The Governor, as representative of the Crown, is the formal repository of power, which is exercised by him or her on the advice of the Premier of South Australia and the cabinet. The Premier and ministers are appointed by the Governor, and hold office by virtue of their ability to command the support of a majority of members of the Legislative Assembly. Judicial power is exercised by the Supreme Court of South Australia and a system of subordinate courts, but the High Court of Australia and other federal courts have overriding jurisdiction on matters which fall under the ambit of the Australian Constitution.

== State party support by region ==
=== Liberal ===
Chaffey is now considered to be a safe Liberal seat.

=== Nationals ===
The Nationals' only seat in the recent past is the Chaffey, held between 1997 and 2010 by Karlene Maywald, who became a minister in the Rann Labour government.

=== Labor ===
Taylor is considered to be a safe Labor seat.

=== Marginal seats ===
Elder, Newland, Adelaide, King, Mawson, Wright, Lee, Torrens, Hurtle Vale and Badcoe are considered to be marginal seats.

== Federal politics ==
South Australia has 10 seats in the Australian House of Representatives, the least of any mainland state.

=== Party support by region ===
==== Liberals ====
Grey is considered to be a safe Liberal seat.

==== Labor ====
Adelaide is considered to be a safe Labor seat.

==== Marginal seats ====
Sturt is considered to be a marginal seat.

== Referendum results in South Australia ==
As of 2024, the most recent state referendum in South Australia was in 1991.

=== Results of referendums ===
Year	No.	Name	National voters	States	SA
1906	1	Senate Elections	82.65%	6:0	86.99%
1910	2	State Debts	54.95%	5:1	73.18%
1910	3	Surplus Revenue	49.04%	3:3	49.06%
1911	4	Trade and Commerce	39.42%	1:5	38.07%
1911	5	Monopolies	39.89%	1:5	38.42%
1913	6	Trade and Commerce	49.38%	3:3	51.32%
1913	7	Corporations	49.33%	3:3	51.34%
1913	8	Industrial Matters	49.33%	3:3	51.40%
1913	9	Trusts	49.78%	3:3	51.67%
1913	10	Monopolies	49.33%	3:3	51.26%
1913	11	Railway Disputes	49.13%	3:3	51.28%
1919	12	Legislative Powers	49.65%	3:3	25.28%
1919	13	Monopolies	48.64%	3:3	25.54%
1926	14	Industry and Commerce	43.50%	2:4	29.32%
1926	15	Essential Services	42.80%	2:4	31.32%
1928	16	State Debts	74.30%	6:0	62.68%
1937	17	Aviation	53.56%	2:4	40.13%
1937	18	Marketing	36.26%	0:6	20.83%
1944	19	Post-War Reconstruction and Democratic Rights	45.99%	2:4	50.64%
1946	20	Social Services	54.39%	6:0	51.73%
1946	21	Marketing	50.57%	3:3	48.74%
1946	22	Industrial Employment	50.30%	3:3	48.20%
1948	23	Rents and Prices	40.66%	0:6	42.15%
1951	24	Communists and Communism	49.44%	3:3	47.29%
1967	25	Parliament	40.25%	1:5	33.91%
1967	26	Aboriginals	90.77%	6:0	86.26%
1973	27	Prices	43.81%	0:6	41.16%
1973	28	Incomes	34.42%	0:6	28.25%
1974	29	Simultaneous Elections	48.30%	1:5	47.14%
1974	30	Mode of Altering the Constitution	47.99%	1:5	44.26%
1974	31	Democratic Elections	47.20%	1:5	44.11%
1974	32	Local Government Bodies	46.85%	1:5	42.52%
1977	33	Simultaneous Elections	62.22%	3:3	65.99%
1977	34	Senate Casual Vacancies	73.32%	6:0	76.59%
1977	35	Referendums	77.72%	6:0	83.29%
1977	36	Retirement of Judges	80.10%	6:0	85.57%
1984	37	Terms of Senators	50.64%	2:4	49.98%
1984	38	Interchange of Powers	47.06%	0:6	45.94%
1988	39	Parliamentary Terms	32.92%	0:6	26.76%
1988	40	Fair Elections	37.60%	0:6	30.61%
1988	41	Local Government	33.62%	0:6	29.85%
1988	42	Rights and Freedoms	30.79%	0:6	26.01%
1999	43	Establishment of Republic	45.13%	0:6	43.57%
1999	44	Preamble	39.34%	0:6	38.10%
2023	45	Aboriginal and Torres Strait Islander Voice	39.94%	0:6	35.83%

== Notable South Australian political figures ==
- Thomas Playford IV, 33rd premier of South Australia, longest-serving premier in South Australia and in Australia (1938–1965)
- Don Dunstan, 35th premier of South Australia, fourth longest serving premier in South Australian history (1967-68 and 1970–1979).
- Steele Hall, 36th premier of South Australia, was a state parliamentarian from 1959 to 1974, Australian Senator 1974-1977 and member for Boothby 1981-1996
- John Bannon, 39th premier of South Australia, second longest serving premier in South Australian history.
- Nick Xenophon, Senator for South Australia from 2008 to 2017 and founder of No Pokies and SA Best.
- Cory Bernardi, Senator for South Australia from 2006 to 2020 and founder of Australian Conservatives
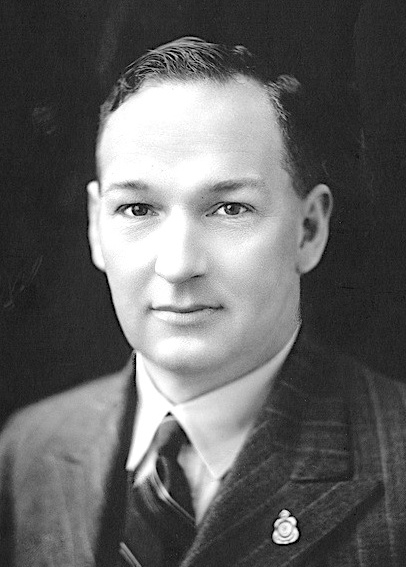
Thomas Playford

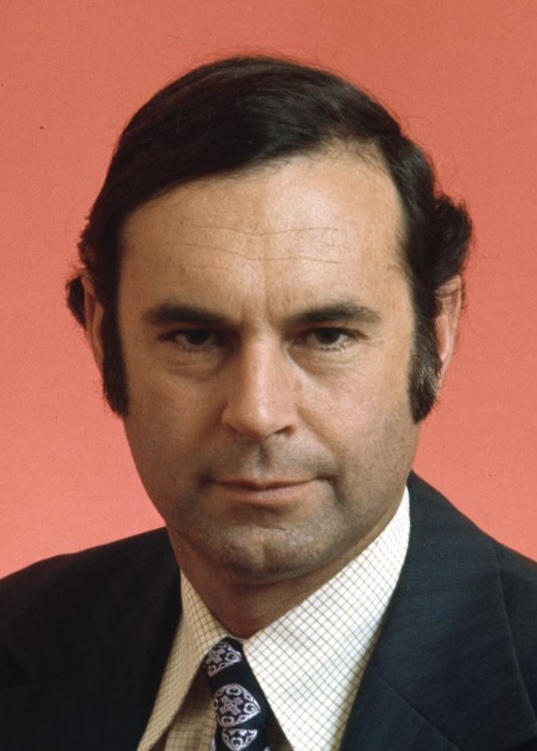
Steele Hall

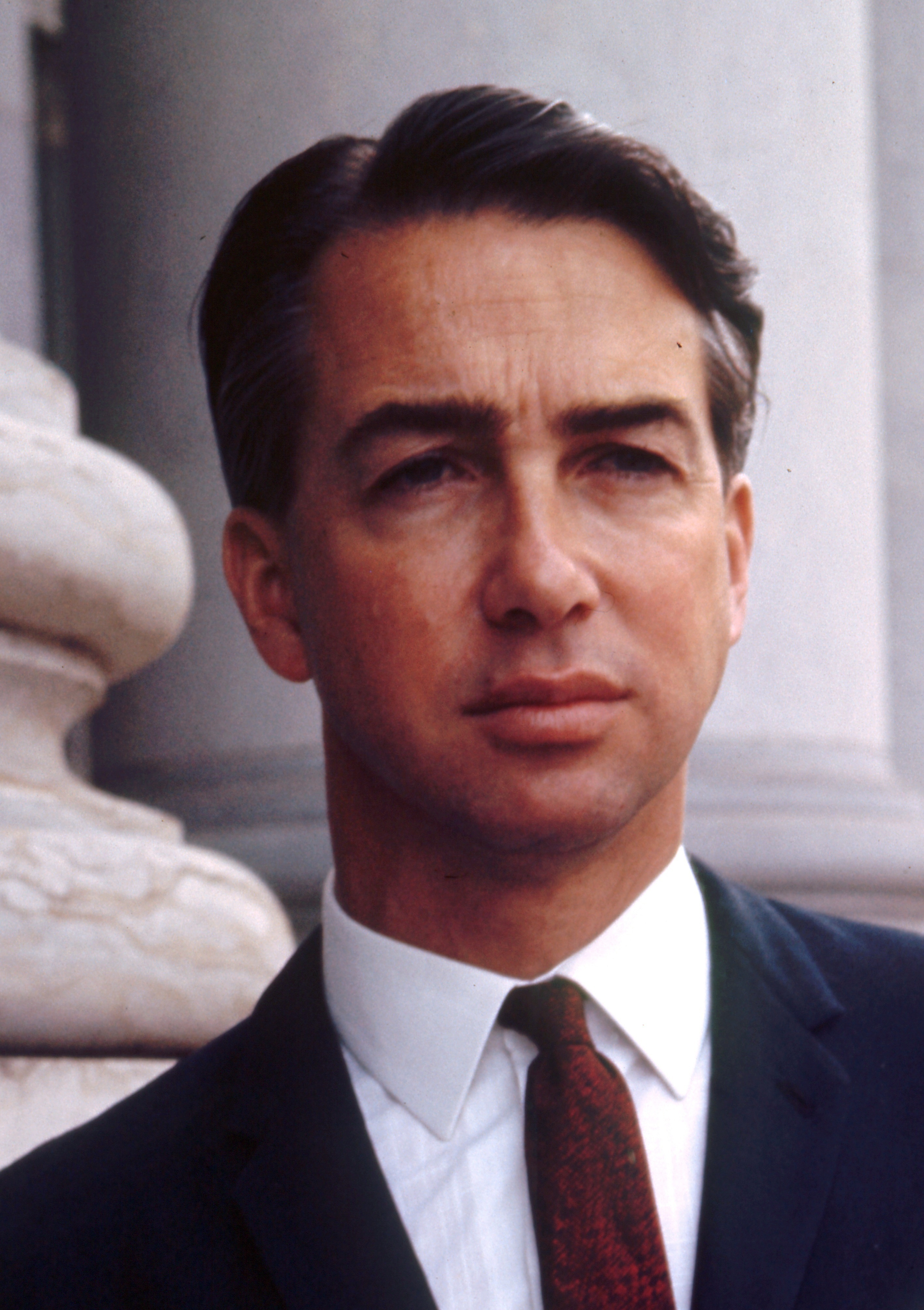
Don Dunstan

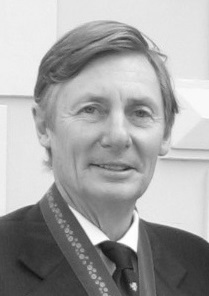
John Bannon

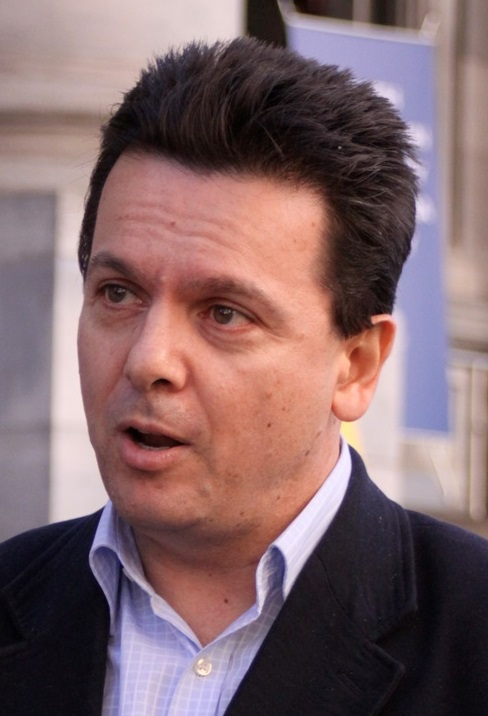
Nick Xenophon

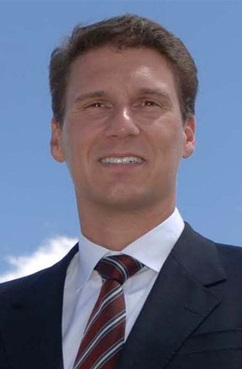
Cory Bernardi

== Recent state election results ==
	Primary vote		
	ALP	LPA	Oth.
2002 South Australia state election	36.34%	39.97%	23.69%
2006 South Australia state election	45.22%	33.97%	20.81%
2010 South Australia state election	37.47%	41.65%	20.88%
2014 South Australia state election	35.80%	44.75%	19.41%
2018 South Australia state election	32.8%	38.0%	29.30%
2022 South Australia state election	39.97%	35.67%	24.36%
2026 South Australia state election	37.47%	18.92%	43.6%

== See also ==
- Premiers of South Australia
- Governors of South Australia
- Electoral results for the Australian Senate in South Australia
