= Politics of Queensland =

Politics of the Australian state of Queensland

One of the six founding states of Australia, Queensland has been a federated state subject to the Australian Constitution since 1 January 1901. It is a parliamentary constitutional monarchy. The constitution of Queensland sets out the operation of the state's government. The state's constitution contains several entrenched provisions which cannot be changed in the absence of a referendum. There is also a statutory bill of rights, the Queensland Human Rights Act 2019. Queensland's system of government is influenced by the Westminster system and Australia's federal system of government.

The powers of the state can be classified into three types:

- Legislature: the unicameral Parliament of Queensland, comprising the Legislative Assembly and the Monarch (represented by the Governor);
- Executive: the Queensland Government, consisting of the Executive Council of Queensland, which formalises decisions of the Cabinet of Queensland, which is composed of the Premier and other ministers of state appointed by the Governor on the advice of the premier;
- Judiciary: the Supreme Court and other state courts, whose judges are appointed by the Governor on advice of the attorney-general.

However, unlike the Commonwealth level of government or the United States, there is no legally enforceable separation of powers. The only restriction is that state parliaments may not abolish or impermissibly interfere with the institutional integrity of supreme (or other) courts under the Kable doctrine.

== Legislature ==
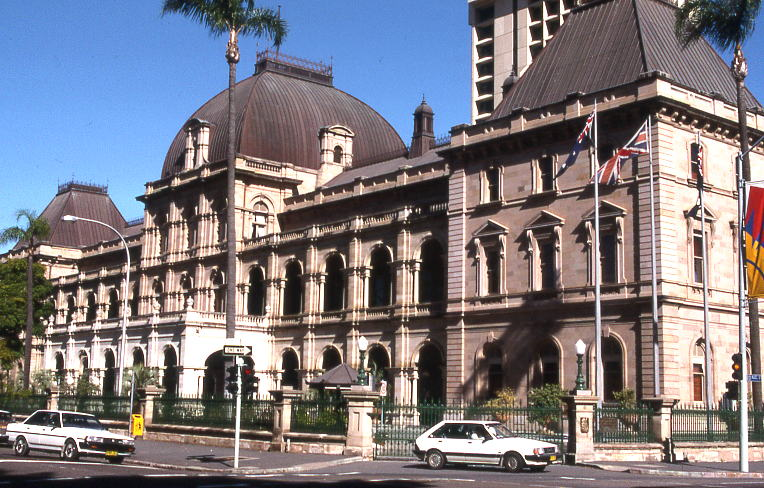
Parliament House, seat of the Queensland Parliament

Legislative authority is formally held by the monarch acting with the advice and consent of the Legislative Assembly (i.e. King-in-parliament). These two bodies together form the Parliament of Queensland, which uniquely for Australian states is unicameral, containing only one house, the Legislative Assembly. The Parliament was bicameral until 1922, when the Legislative Council was abolished by the Labor suicide squad, so called because they were appointed for the purpose of voting to abolish their own offices. Bills receive royal assent from the governor before being passed into law. The Parliament's normally sits at the Parliament House at Gardens Point in Brisbane's CBD, however regional sittings also take place. Members of the Legislative Assembly represent 93 electoral districts under fixed four year terms, with elections utilising full preferential voting.

== Executive ==
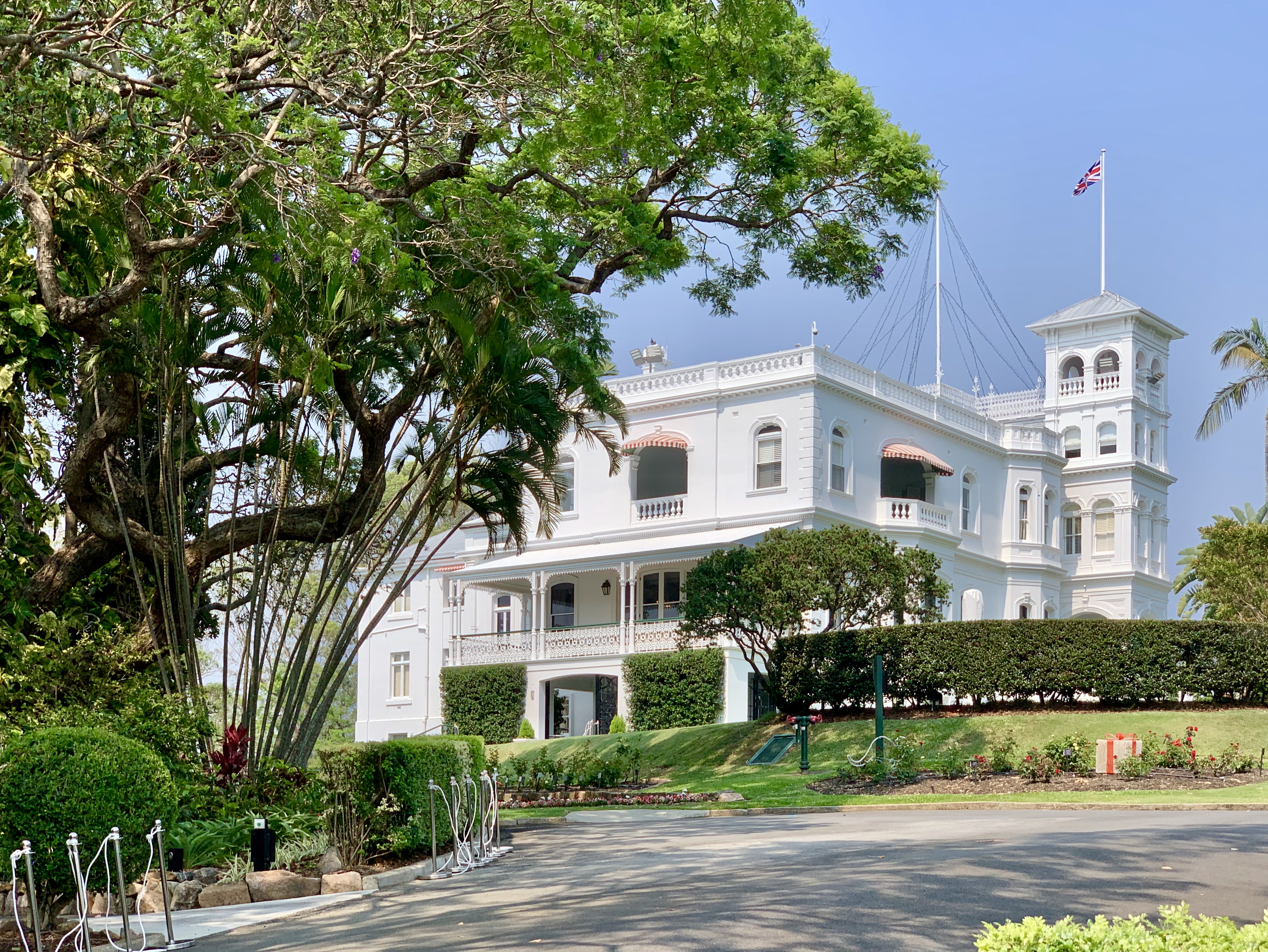
Government House, seat of the Governor

Executive authority is formally exercised by the Governor of Queensland (currently Jeannette Young) as the representative of the monarch (currently King Charles III). However, except for certain reserve powers, the governor only acts in accordance with the advice of the Premier of Queensland. The premier (who is the state's head of government) along with the Cabinet of Queensland (whose decisions are given legal force by the Executive Council), exercise executive authority in practice. The premier is appointed by the governor and must have support of the Legislative Assembly of Queensland. The premier is in practice a leading member of the Legislative Assembly and parliamentary leader of his or her political party, or coalition of parties, and members of Cabinet will be drawn from the same party or coalition. The current Premier and Deputy Premier are David Crisafulli and Jarrod Bleijie of the Liberal National Party of Queensland respectively. Government House at Paddington in Brisbane is the residence of the Governor, having replaced Old Government House at Gardens Point in Brisbane's CBD in the early 20th century.

== Judiciary ==
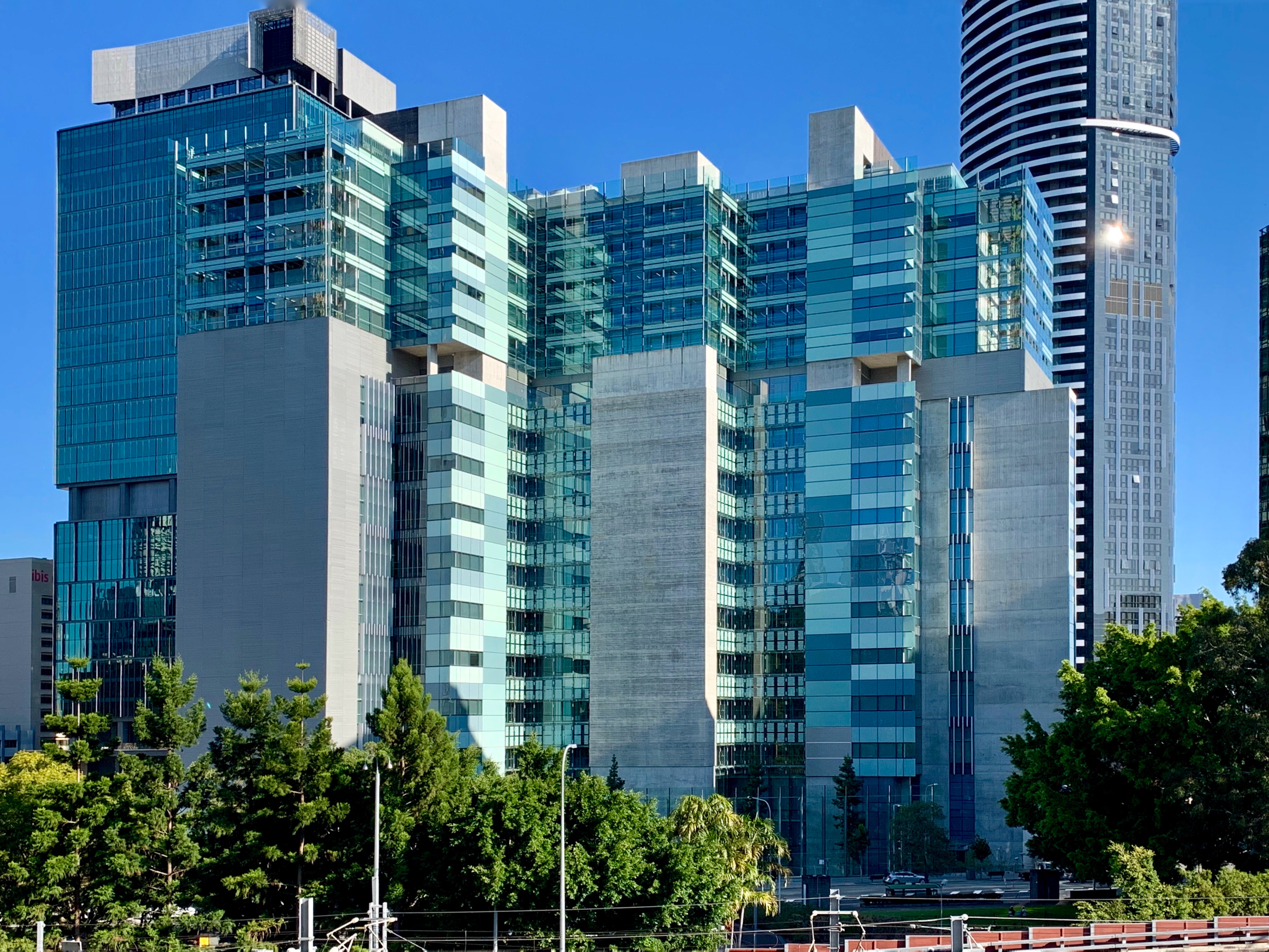
Queen Elizabeth II Courts of Law, headquarters of the Supreme Court of Queensland and District Court of Queensland

The state's judiciary consists of the Supreme Court of Queensland and the District Court of Queensland, established by the Queensland Constitution, as well as the Magistrates Court of Queensland and other courts and tribunals established by legislation. Cases may be appealed to the High Court of Australia. As with all Australian states and territories, Queensland has a common law legal system. The supreme and district courts are headquartered at the Queen Elizabeth II Courts of Law in Brisbane's CBD.

The Supreme Court of Queensland, Trial Division, is the highest original jurisdiction, and the Court of Appeal is the highest appellate jurisdiction within Queensland. The current chief justice is Catherine Holmes. The High Court of Australia hears appeals from the court of appeal.

=== Magistrates Court ===
The Magistrates Court is a lower court of the judicial hierarchy of Queensland. The court's criminal jurisdiction covers summary offences, and indictable offences which may be heard summarily, but all criminal proceedings in Queensland begin in the Magistrates Court, even if they are not within this jurisdiction. For charges beyond its jurisdiction, the court conducts committal hearings in which the presiding magistrate decides, based on the strength of the evidence, whether to refer the matter to a higher court or dismiss it. The court's civil jurisdiction covers matters in which the amount in dispute is less than or equal to $150,000. Appeals against decisions by the Magistrates Court are heard by the District Court.

=== District Court ===
The District Court is the middle tier of the judicial hierarchy of Queensland. The court has jurisdiction to hear all appeals from decisions made in the Magistrates Court. Its criminal jurisdiction covers serious indictable offences (such as armed robbery, rape, and dangerous driving). The court's civil jurisdiction covers matters in which the amount in dispute is more than $150,000 but less than or equal to $750,000. Appeals against decisions by the District Court are heard by the Court of Appeal, a division of the Supreme Court.

=== Supreme Court ===
The Supreme Court is the highest tier of the judicial hierarchy in Queensland. The court has two divisions; the Trial Division and the Court of Appeal. The Trial Division's jurisdiction covers serious criminal offences (including murder and manslaughter), and civil matters involving claims of more than $750,000. The Court of Appeal's jurisdiction allows it to hear cases on appeal from the Trial Division, the District Court, and a number of other judicial tribunals in Queensland. Appeals against decisions by the Court of Appeal are heard by the High Court of Australia.

== Local government ==
Local government is the mechanism by which local government areas can manage their own affairs to the extent permitted by the Local Government Act 2009. Queensland is divided into 77 local government areas, which are created by the state government under legislation. Each local government area has a council responsible for providing a range of local services and utilities. Local councils derive their income from both rates and charges on resident ratepayers, and grants and subsidies from the state and federal governments.

== Federal representation ==
Queensland – Federal parliamentary delegations
Election
Election	House of Representatives			Senate		
Election	Coalition (Note: Includes the Liberal Party of Australia, National Party of Australia, Liberal National Party of Queensland and Country Liberal Party. In 2008, all Coalition parties in Queensland merged into the Liberal National Party of Queensland.)	Labor	Other (Note: Includes independents and minor parties.)	Coalition	Labor	Other
2001	19	7	1	5	4	3
2004	21	5	1	7	4	1
2007	13	15	1	7	5	0
2010	21	8	1	6	5	1
2013	22	6	2	6	4	2
2016	21	8	1	5	4	3
2019	23	6	1	6	3	3
2022	21	5	4	5	3	4
2025	16	12	2	4	4	4

In the federal Parliament of Australia, Queensland accounts for 30 of the 151 electoral divisions in the House of Representatives (on the basis of population size) and 12 of the 76 seats in the Senate (on the basis of equality between the states).

The current partisan makeup of Queensland's House of Representatives delegation is 16 Liberal National, 12 Labor, 1 Greens and 1 Katter's Australian Party.

The current partisan makeup of Queensland's Senate delegation is 5 Liberal National, 3 Labor, 2 One Nation and 2 Green.

== Idiosyncrasies ==
The state's politics are traditionally regarded as being conservative relative to other states. Historically, a gerrymander favouring rural electoral districts and the lack of an upper house has meant that Queensland had a long tradition of domination by strong-willed, populist premiers, often accused of authoritarian tendencies, holding office for long periods. This tendency was exemplified by the government of the state's longest-serving Premier Joh Bjelke-Petersen.

While most Australian states have over 60% of their populations concentrated in the capital cities, Brisbane accounts for about half of Queensland's population. This relative decentralisation of the population made the state a stronghold for the National Party. Before the merger of the Queensland branches of the Liberals and Nationals as the Liberal National Party, the National Party had been the senior partner in the non-Labor Coalition since 1924. In other states and federally, the long-standing coalition between the Nationals and Liberals typically has the National Party as the junior partner.

== Referendum results in Queensland ==
=== Results of referendums ===
Year	No.	Name	National Voters	States	QLD (Note: Queensland is the easiest state to gain majority assent in, with residents assenting to 29 constitutional amendments (the mean state assents to 17 amendments).)
1906	1	Senate Elections	82.65%	6:0	76.84%
1910	2	State Debts	54.95%	5:1	33.34%
1910	3	Surplus Revenue	49.04%	3:3	54.58%
1911	4	Trade and Commerce	39.42%	1:5	43.75%
1911	5	Monopolies	39.89%	1:5	44.26%
1913	6	Trade and Commerce	49.38%	3:3	54.34%
1913	7	Corporations	49.33%	3:3	54.31%
1913	8	Industrial Matters	49.33%	3:3	54.36%
1913	9	Trusts	49.78%	3:3	54.78%
1913	10	Monopolies	49.33%	3:3	54.17%
1913	11	Railway Disputes	49.13%	3:3	54.19%
1919	12	Legislative Powers	49.65%	3:3	57.35%
1919	13	Monopolies	48.64%	3:3	56.92%
1926	14	Industry and Commerce	43.50%	2:4	52.10%
1926	15	Essential Services	42.80%	2:4	50.56%
1928	16	State Debts	74.30%	6:0	88.60%
1937	17	Aviation	53.56%	2:4	61.87%
1937	18	Marketing	36.26%	0:6	38.78%
1944	19	Post-War Reconstruction and Democratic Rights	45.99%	2:4	36.52%
1946	20	Social Services	54.39%	6:0	51.26%
1946	21	Marketing	50.57%	3:3	45.74%
1946	22	Industrial Employment	50.30%	3:3	43.42%
1948	23	Rents and Prices	40.66%	0:6	30.80%
1951	24	Communists and Communism	49.44%	3:3	55.76%
1967	25	Parliament	40.25%	1:5	44.13%
1967	26	Aboriginals	90.77%	6:0	89.21%
1973	27	Prices	43.81%	0:6	38.47%
1973	28	Incomes	34.42%	0:6	31.70%
1974	29	Simultaneous Elections	48.30%	1:5	44.32%
1974	30	Mode of Altering the Constitution	47.99%	1:5	44.29%
1974	31	Democratic Elections	47.20%	1:5	43.70%
1974	32	Local Government Bodies	46.85%	1:5	43.68%
1977	33	Simultaneous Elections	62.22%	3:3	47.51%
1977	34	Senate Casual Vacancies	73.32%	6:0	58.86%
1977	35	Referendums	77.72%	6:0	59.58%
1977	36	Retirement of Judges	80.10%	6:0	65.24%
1984	37	Terms of Senators	50.64%	2:4	45.65%
1984	38	Interchange of Powers	47.06%	0:6	41.69%
1988	39	Parliamentary Terms	32.92%	0:6	35.15%
1988	40	Fair Elections	37.60%	0:6	44.83%
1988	41	Local Government	33.62%	0:6	38.31%
1988	42	Rights and Freedoms	30.79%	0:6	32.90%
1999	43	Establishment of Republic	45.13%	0:6	37.44%
1999	44	Preamble	39.34%	0:6	32.81%
2023	45	Aboriginal and Torres Strait Islander Voice	39.94%	0:6	31.79%

== Recent history ==
In the 1989 state election environmental issues like rainforest protection were prominent, especially in Far North Queensland, contributing to the success of the ALP at the time. The dramatic collapse in support for the Goss government resulted in its returning from the 1995 general election with a majority of only one seat. This in turn was subsequently lost after the controversial and closely fought Mundingburra by-election. The Nationals formed minority government after securing the support of independent Liz Cunningham, with Rob Borbidge becoming Premier.

In stark contrast to some of his predecessors, Borbidge's government was not markedly domineering. However, controversies such as public service purges, disputes with the Criminal Justice Commission, and other scandals did do some damage to the government.

Events were superseded by the meteoric rise of controversial federal politician Pauline Hanson. Especially popular in her native Queensland, Hanson's decision to form her own political party (Pauline Hanson's One Nation) was greeted with apprehension by all the other parties, in particular the Nationals striving to maintain their rural conservative heartland. In 1998, a bitter dispute broke out within and between the Liberal and National parties over whether One Nation candidates should be ranked lower on how-to-vote cards than Labor candidates. Eventually, the Nationals decided to place Labor behind One Nation. This move backfired spectacularly in the election, with the urban Liberal vote deserting to Labor and an unexpectedly high One Nation primary vote of just under 23%, giving the party 11 seats in parliament. Labor attained 44 seats, one short of a majority, and achieved government with the support of Cunningham and new independent Peter Wellington.

The new minority government managed to secure itself a majority in a by-election and was dominated overwhelmingly by the self-confessed "media tart" Peter Beattie. A major controversy broke in 2001 on the eve of the election, when a number of very prominent Labor Party figures were implicated in rorting internal preselection and party ballots. The subsequent Shepardson Commission of Inquiry was widely expected to destroy the government. Beattie immediately undertook a purge, taking the opportunity to dispatch several factional enemies, and promised a "cleanskin" approach.

To the surprise of many, Beattie's public contrition was overwhelmingly popular, and in contrast to its previous tenuous hold on power, the government won a massive majority of 66 seats, with the Liberal Party reduced to only three seats.

In February 2004, The Beattie Labor team was again returned to government with 63 seats, National Party 15 seats, the Liberal Party five seats, one One Nation and five independents. This election saw the continual decline of the once conspicuous One Nation party from three seats in 2001 and 11 seats in 1998. It also saw the entrenched status of the Queensland ALP with its untouchable majority, despite allegations of bullying by senior Ministers, improper private use of public vehicles, the "Winegate" affair involving first-time Minister for Indigenous Affairs, Liddy Clark, and the government's repeated use of freedom of information laws to prevent the publication of potentially damaging information. Some notable outcomes of the 2004 election were the unseating of Labor Minister, Merri Rose, with a two-party swing of 15 points following her involvement in the use of a government vehicle by her son for private purposes, and the victory in former National Party Premier Rob Borbidge's seat, Surfers Paradise, by the Liberal Candidate, John-Paul Langbroek. Following the 2004 election, the National and Liberal parties ended their coalition and the Liberal party became a minor party on the back benches.

2005 saw a similar landscape for Queensland politics as 2004: increasing allegations that the Labor government lacked accountability and that the opposition lacked ability to hold the government to account. The once unstoppable National–Liberal coalition remained in tatters as the parties continued their war of words over who held the greatest chance of electoral success in the one-time National Party heartland of the Gold Coast. The Liberal Party was adamant that it had better electoral prospects by distancing itself from the National party despite the National Party holding three times as many seats. The premier instigated an independent inquiry into allegations of medical malpractice at Bundaberg Hospital, and in particular the circumstances behind the engagement of the unqualified doctor, Jayant Patel, more popularly known as "Dr Death", whose involvement was linked to numerous deaths at the hospital. Opposition parties and community groups protested that the terms of reference were narrow, avoiding investigation into broader allegations of maladministration of Queensland Health and bullying of departmental employees.

The resignations of deputy premier Terry Mackenroth and Speaker Ray Hollis triggered by-elections in the electorates of Chatsworth and Redcliffe on 20 August 2005. Both of the formerly safe Labor seats were lost and Liberal candidates Michael Caltabiano and Terry Rogers were elected as the new members for Chatsworth and Redcliffe respectively.

Following the announcement that Nita Cunningham would be retiring because of cancer, Premier Beattie called a general election for 9 September 2006. The Coalition failed to promote a united team under Lawrence Springborg MP, ready to assume government following a failed attempt to merge to the National Party into the Queensland Liberal Party earlier in the year. With the election due to be called any day, the Liberal Party surprised the public by ejecting long-standing leader, Bob Quinn, and electing Bruce Flegg MP as leader of the Liberal Party.

The election campaign started badly for the Coalition when in the opening days, Flegg was unable to clearly articulate the Coalition position should the Liberals achieve a majority in their party on winning government, and continued with numerous gaffes which were keenly covered by the media. The Coalition found it difficult to gain momentum after these initial blunders and despite a number of real issues to take the government to task over concerning infrastructure, the health system and water, the media remained focused on the personal leadership skills of the Coalition's front men. The ALP campaigned on the theme of a solid leadership team and this was overwhelming endorsed at the polls.

A second attempt at merging the Liberal and National parties was successful with the Liberal National Party being formed in 2008 with former Nationals leader Lawrence Springborg elected as its inaugural leader. Despite a swing towards it, the new Liberal National Party was defeated by the Labor Party, now led by Premier Anna Bligh, in 2009. In 2011 the Liberal Nationals elected Brisbane Lord Mayor Campbell Newman as its new leader. This led to an unusual circumstance in Australian politics, as Newman was not a member of the Legislative Assembly and was, therefore, unable to become the Leader of the Opposition. As a result, former state Nationals' leader Jeff Seeney was elected interim opposition leader while Newman headed the party's election team from outside the legislature.

The 2012 election saw the Liberal National Party defeat Labor in one of the biggest landslides in Australian history, winning 49.65% of the primary vote and 78 of 89 seats, leaving the ALP with seven seats (26.66% of the primary vote), the newly formed Katter's Australian Party winning two seats, and the remaining seats won by independents. Campbell Newman was also successful in entering the Legislative Assembly by defeating Labor incumbent Kate Jones in the seat of Ashgrove.

In 2007, the Queensland Parliament had the highest female parliamentary representation in Australia and the third highest in the world, with 30 out of 89 members having been women. After the 2012 election, Queensland now has the lowest female parliamentary representation in Australia. The LNP government rejected planning policy as a means to address environmental issues. They made the focus of planning throughout Queensland prioritise economic growth only.

Despite its landslide win, the Liberal National Party did not last long in government; it suffered a swing of 14.0% against it at the 2015 state election, while Campbell Newman became the second premier in Queensland history to be defeated in his own seat, by previous incumbent Kate Jones. Coincidentally, this happened almost 100 years after Digby Denham became the first premier to lose his seat when he was defeated in the seat of Oxley by Labor candidate Thomas Llewellyn Jones in 1915. Labor, led by Opposition Leader Annastacia Palaszczuk, won 44 seats and the backing of independent MP Peter Wellington and formed a minority government.

At the 2017 Queensland state election the LNP suffered a 7% swing against it with the Palaszczuk Labor government winning a second term.

The 2020 Queensland state election saw the Palaszczuk Labor government win a third term. Her win meant she will be the longest-serving Australian female head of government as of mid-2021.

	Primary vote		
	ALP	L+NP	Oth.
1998 Queensland state election	38.86%	31.26%	29.88%
2001 Queensland state election	48.93%	28.48%	22.58%
2004 Queensland state election	47.01%	35.46%	17.51%
2006 Queensland state election	46.92%	37.92%	15.16%
2009 Queensland state election	42.25%	41.60%	16.15%
2012 Queensland state election	26.66%	49.66%	23.68%
2015 Queensland state election	37.47%	41.32%	21.21%
2017 Queensland state election	35.43%	33.69%	30.9%
2020 Queensland state election	39.57%	35.89%	24.55%
2024 Queensland state election	32.56%	41.52%	25.92%

== Notable Queensland political figures ==
- Andrew Fisher | Three-time Australian Prime Minister (1908–1909, 1910–1913, 1914–1915) and the first from Queensland
- Joh Bjelke-Petersen | Longest-serving Premier of Queensland (1968–1987)
- Pauline Hanson | Federal MP and senator, founder and leader of One Nation
- Bob Katter | State and federal MP, founder of Katter's Australian Party and Father of the House since 2022
- Annastacia Palaszczuk | Premier of Queensland 2015–2023, the first woman to win the premiership from opposition, leader of the first majority female cabinet in Australian state and federal history
- Kevin Rudd | Prime Minister (2007–2010, 2013), Foreign Minister (2010–2012), Australian Ambassador to the United States (2023-2026)
- Anderson Dawson | Premier of Queensland (1899) and leader of the first Australian Labor Party government in Australia and the first parliamentary Labour Party government anywhere in the world
- Andrew Bartlett | Queensland senator and leader of the Australian Democrats (2002–2004)
- Larissa Waters | Queensland senator and leader of the Australian Greens since 2025
- Anna Bligh | First female Premier of Queensland (2007–2012)
- Peter Dutton | First federal leader of the Liberal Party of Australia from Queensland, first federal Leader of the Opposition to lose their seat at an election
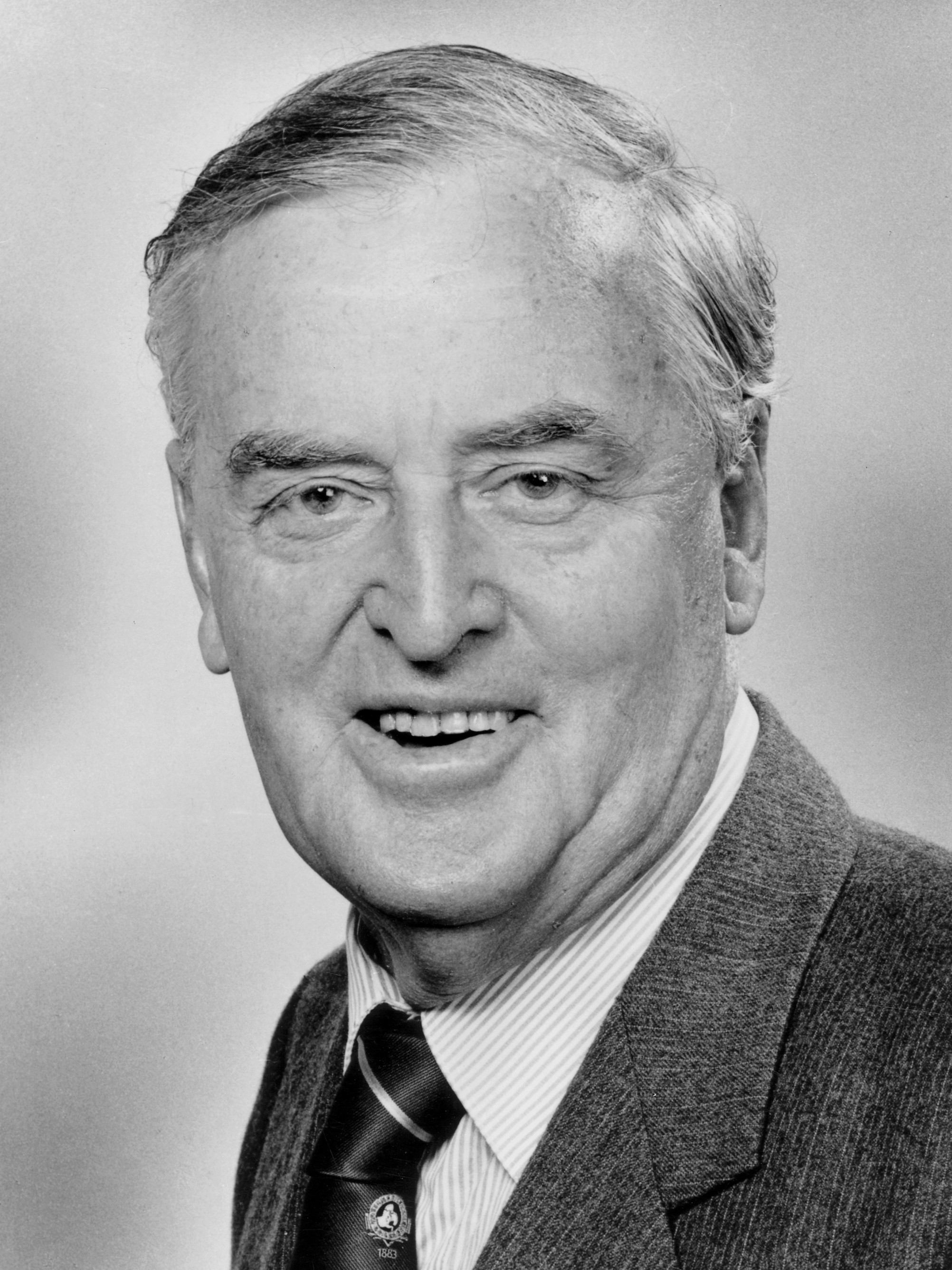
Joh Bjelke-Petersen

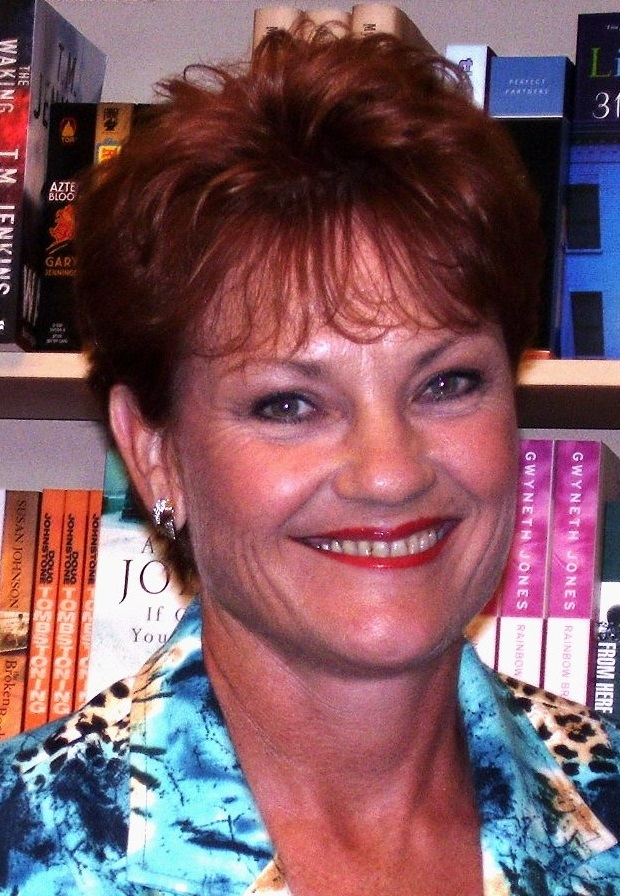
Pauline Hanson

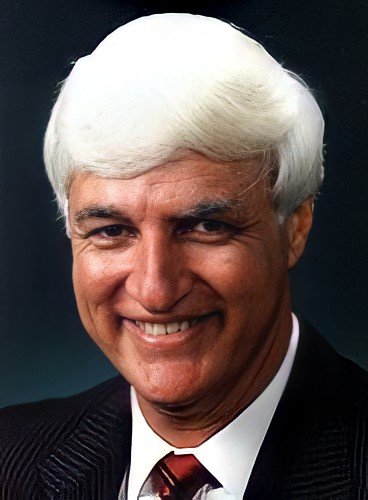
Bob Katter

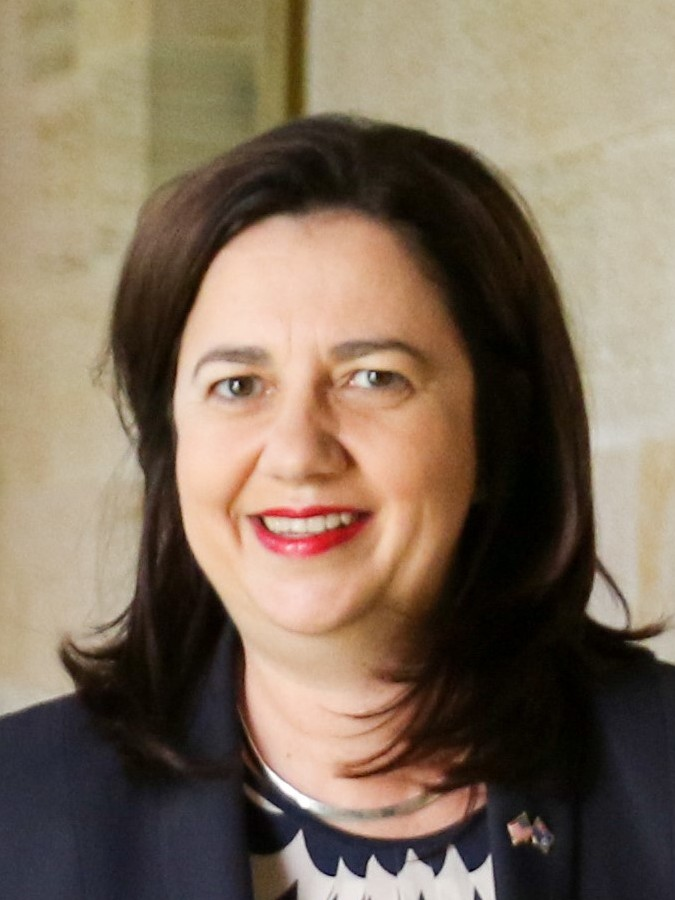
Annastacia Palaszczuk

== See also ==
- Premiers of Queensland
- Governors of Queensland
- State of North Queensland
