= Politics of Victoria =

Overview of politics in Victoria

Politics of the Australian state of Victoria takes place in the context of a constitutional monarchy with a bicameral parliamentary system, and like other Australian states, Victoria is part of the federation known as the Commonwealth of Australia.

== State government ==
The nominal head of the Government of Victoria is the King of Australia, represented in the state by the governor of Victoria. Legislative power rests with the Crown and the two houses of the Parliament of Victoria. The powers and responsibilities of the parliament are defined in the Constitution Act 1975.

The Victorian Government is often referred to as "Spring Street", a metonym of the street of that name where the Parliament House of Victoria is located in Melbourne.

=== Parliament of Victoria ===
The Parliament of Victoria is bicameral, consisting of a Lower and an Upper house.

The Victorian Legislative Assembly (lower house) is composed of 88 members of parliament, each of whom represent a single electoral district and are elected using a preferential voting system/Instant-runoff voting. The Legislative Assembly currently sits for fixed four-year terms. The leader of the party with a majority in the Legislative Assembly (or with the confidence of the Assembly) is appointed by the governor as the premier of Victoria.

The Victorian Legislative Council (upper house) has 40 members (or MLCs), representing eight electoral regions. Five members are elected for each region using a proportional voting system/Single transferable voting. Prior to 2003, the Legislative Council comprised 44 members from 22 two-member provinces until a 2001 constitutional committee recommended the council be re-organised to the current system.

General elections are held every four years, electing the entire Legislative Assembly and the entire Legislative Council. The last state election was on Saturday, 26 November 2022.

=== Executive Government ===
The Victoria State Government enforces acts passed by the parliament through government departments, statutory authorities, and other public agencies. The government is formally presided over by the governor, who exercises executive authority granted by the state's constitution through the Executive Council, a body consisting of senior cabinet ministers. In reality, both the governor and the Executive Council are largely ceremonial, with the premier and ministers having control over policy, appointments, and other executive orders made by the governor.

=== Judiciary ===
Judicial power is exercised by the Supreme Court of Victoria and a system of subordinate courts, but the High Court of Australia and other federal courts have overriding jurisdiction on matters which fall under the ambit of the Australian Constitution.

== Political leanings of Victorians ==
Victorians, and Melburnians in particular, are considered by some analysts to be more progressive than other Australians. The state recorded the highest Yes votes of any state in the republic referendum, same-sex marriage survey and Indigenous Voice referendum. Victorians are said to be "generally socially progressive, supportive of multiculturalism, wary of extremes of any kind".

However, the Liberal Party along with the Nationals at varying points had continuous governance from the 1955 Victorian state election to the 1982 Victorian state election, in part due to the Australian Labor Party split of 1955.

== Federal politics ==
Victorian seats in the Australian Parliament
Political Party	House of Representatives	Senate
ALP	24	4
Coalition	11	5
Independent	3	0
Greens	1	2
UAP	0	1
Source: Australian Parliament House and Australian Electoral Commission 2019

Victoria is divided into 38 federal electoral divisions, each represented by a seat in the Australian House of Representatives. Like other Australian states, Victoria is represented by twelve Senators in the Australian Senate, with six of those Senators elected for two three-year Senate terms at each half-Senate election.

== Political parties ==
The centre-left Australian Labor Party (ALP), the centre-right Liberal Party of Australia, the centre-right National Party of Australia, and the left-wing environmentalist Australian Greens are Victoria's main political parties. Traditionally, Labor is strongest in Melbourne's working and middle class western, northern and inner-city suburbs, and the regional cities of Ballarat, Bendigo and Geelong. The Liberals' main support lies in Melbourne's more affluent eastern suburbs and outer suburbs, and some rural and regional centres. The Nationals are strongest in Victoria's North Western and Eastern rural regional areas. The Greens, who won their first lower house seats in 2014, are strongest in inner Melbourne.

Victoria is currently governed by the Australian Labor Party, which regained power in the 2014 Victorian state election; the Labor Party have governed Victoria for all but eleven of the past 44 years (1982–1992, 1999–2010, 2014–present). The other major parties are the Liberal and National Coalition parties.

Other current Parliamentary parties in Victorian politics include the Greens, the Libertarian Party, the Animal Justice Party, the Democratic Labour Party (DLP), the Shooters, Fishers and Farmers Party, and Pauline Hanson's One Nation. All state Parliamentary parties except for the DLP and Transport Matters are registered to contest federal elections.

Parties not represented in the Parliament include the Companions and Pets Party, the Health Australia Party, and the Victorian Socialists. Of these four parties, only One Nation is registered to contest federal elections.

== Referendum results in Victoria ==
=== Results of referendums ===
Year	No.	Name	National Voters	States	VIC
1906	1	Senate Elections	82.65%	6:0	83.10%
1910	2	State Debts	54.95%	5:1	64.59%
1910	3	Surplus Revenue	49.04%	3:3	45.26%
1911	4	Trade and Commerce	39.42%	1:5	38.64%
1911	5	Monopolies	39.89%	1:5	38.95%
1913	6	Trade and Commerce	49.38%	3:3	49.12%
1913	7	Corporations	49.33%	3:3	49.14%
1913	8	Industrial Matters	49.33%	3:3	49.02%
1913	9	Trusts	49.78%	3:3	49.71%
1913	10	Monopolies	49.33%	3:3	49.07%
1913	11	Railway Disputes	49.13%	3:3	48.79%
1919	12	Legislative Powers	49.65%	3:3	64.65%
1919	13	Monopolies	48.64%	3:3	63.29%
1926	14	Industry and Commerce	43.50%	2:4	36.23%
1926	15	Essential Services	42.80%	2:4	35.55%
1928	16	State Debts	74.30%	6:0	87.78%
1937	17	Aviation	53.56%	2:4	65.10%
1937	18	Marketing	36.26%	0:6	46.58%
1944	19	Post-War Reconstruction and Democratic Rights	45.99%	2:4	49.31%
1946	20	Social Services	54.39%	6:0	55.98%
1946	21	Marketing	50.57%	3:3	52.37%
1946	22	Industrial Employment	50.30%	3:3	52.08%
1948	23	Rents and Prices	40.66%	0:6	44.63%
1951	24	Communists and Communism	49.44%	3:3	48.71%
1967	25	Parliament	40.25%	1:5	30.87%
1967	26	Aboriginals	90.77%	6:0	94.68%
1973	27	Prices	43.81%	0:6	45.18%
1973	28	Incomes	34.42%	0:6	33.44%
1974	29	Simultaneous Elections	48.30%	1:5	49.19%
1974	30	Mode of Altering the Constitution	47.99%	1:5	49.22%
1974	31	Democratic Elections	47.20%	1:5	47.71%
1974	32	Local Government Bodies	46.85%	1:5	47.38%
1977	33	Simultaneous Elections	62.22%	3:3	65.00%
1977	34	Senate Casual Vacancies	73.32%	6:0	76.13%
1977	35	Referendums	77.72%	6:0	80.78%
1977	36	Retirement of Judges	80.10%	6:0	81.43%
1984	37	Terms of Senators	50.64%%	2:4	53.20%
1984	38	Interchange of Powers	47.06%	0:6	49.86%
1988	39	Parliamentary Terms	32.92%	0:6	36.20%
1988	40	Fair Elections	37.60%	0:6	40.12%
1988	41	Local Government	33.62%	0:6	36.06%
1988	42	Rights and Freedoms	30.79%	0:6	33.42%
1999	43	Establishment of Republic	45.13%	0:6	49.84%
1999	44	Preamble	39.34%	0:6	42.46%
2023 (Note: Results for this referendum are preliminary, and percentages may change, however the result is very likely not to change.)	45	Aboriginal and Torres Strait Islander Voice	39.24%	0:6	44.98%

== Notable Victorian political figures ==
Daniel Mannix: Catholic archbishop and opponent of conscription in World War I.

John Wren: Bookmaker, underworld figure and politician. The famous novel Power Without Glory by communist author Frank Hardy was allegedly based on his exploits, although a short TV documentary appearing on Rewind showed Hardy's portrayal of Wren as a lifelong crime figure was itself politically motivated. Unsuccessful attempts were made to suppress the novel on the grounds of libel, although these backfired and caused the fictional life of Hardy's John West to become tangled with Wren's in the minds of most Australians.

Robert Menzies: Australia's longest-serving prime minister serving twice (1939-1941, 1949-1966) for a cumulative 18 years and 5 months. He helped found the Liberal party and his administration was characterised by anti-communist policies, including the Communist Party Dissolution Act. He was awarded by Queen Elizabeth the knighthood of the Order of Australia.

Henry Bolte: Premier of Victoria from 1955 to 1972, notable for his conservative populist style and for his role in the last judicial execution (the hanging of Ronald Ryan in 1967) in Australia.

Jeff Kennett: Premier from 1992 to 1999. His aggressive reforms and populist style led to a surprise electoral loss in 1999 to Steve Bracks.

Daniel Andrews: Premier from 2014 to 2023.

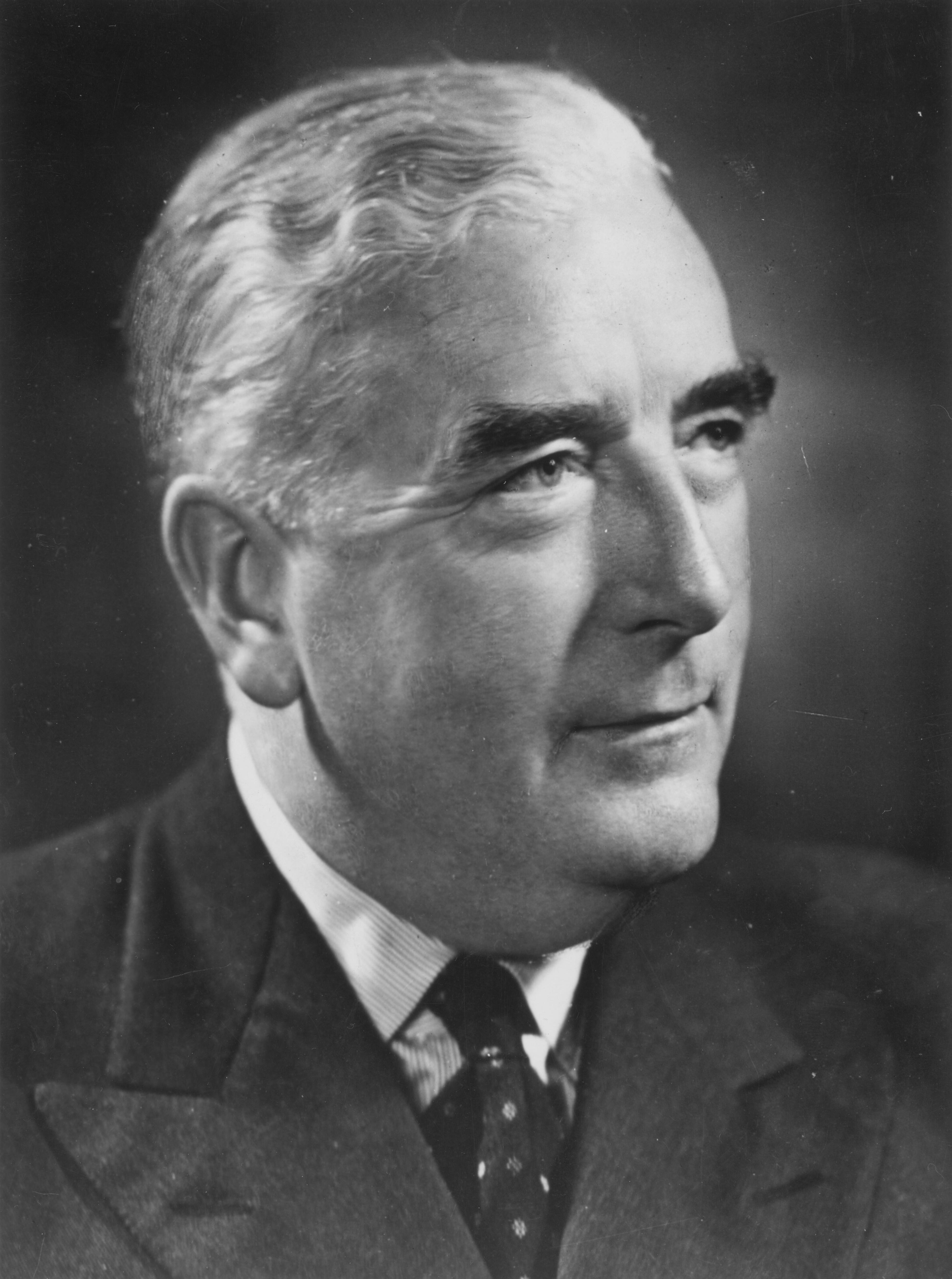
Menzies

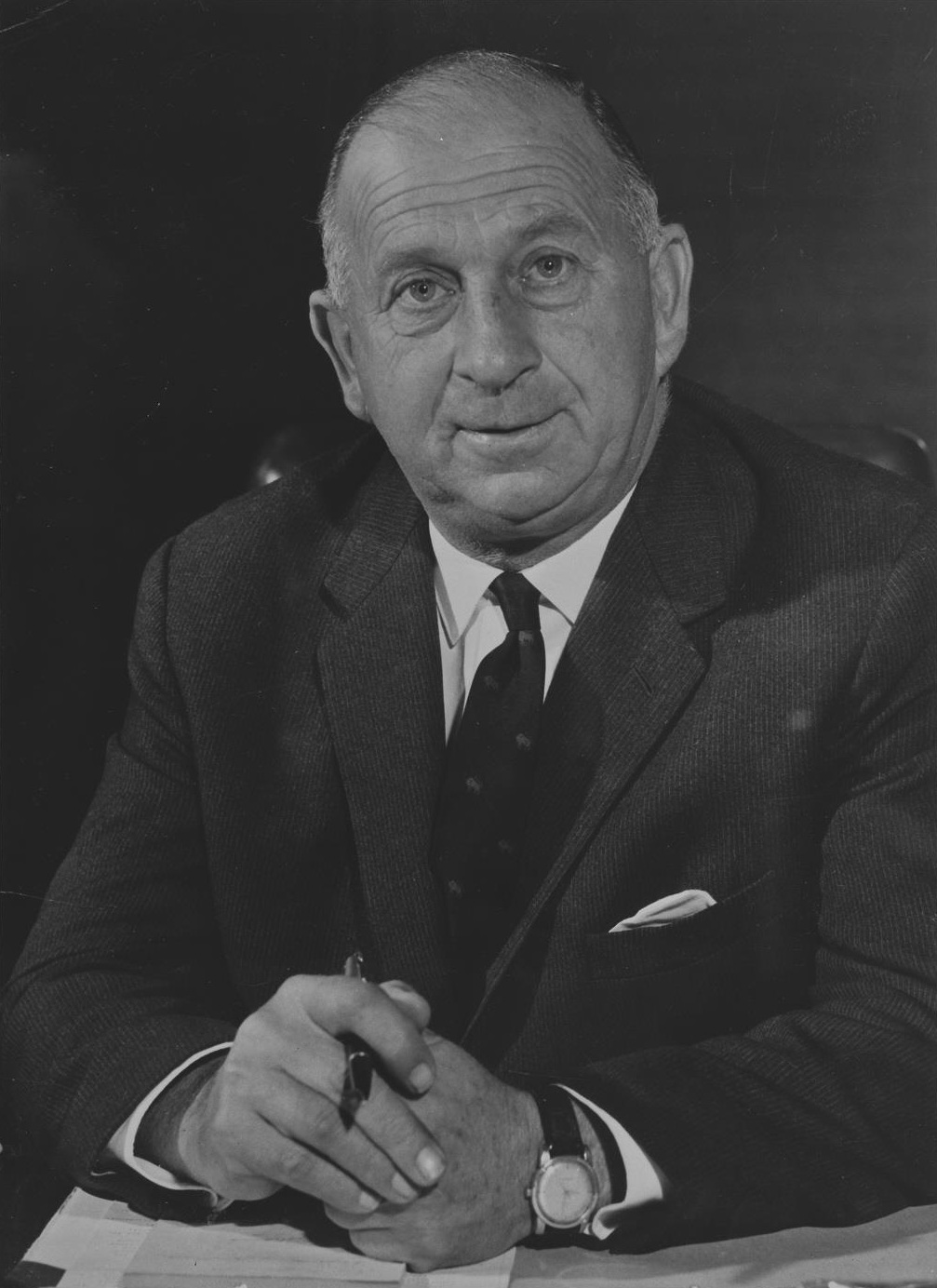
Henry Bolte

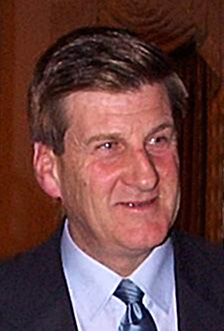
Jeff Kennett

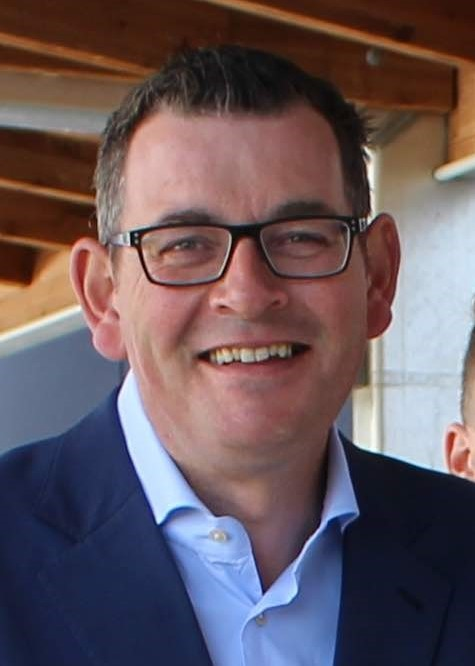
Daniel Andrews

== Recent state election results ==
	Primary vote		
	ALP	L+NP	Oth.
1999 Victorian state election	45.57%	47.02%	7.41%
2002 Victorian state election	47.95%	38.21%	13.84%
2006 Victorian state election	43.06%	39.61%	17.34%
2010 Victorian state election	36.25%	44.78%	18.98%
2014 Victorian state election	38.10%	42.0%	19.9%
2018 Victorian state election	42.86%	35.19%	21.95%
2022 Victorian state election	36.66%	34.48%	28.86%

== See also ==
- 2022 Victorian state election
- List of elections in Victoria
- Electoral results for the Australian Senate in Victoria
- Premiers of Victoria
- Governors of Victoria
- Victorian Pride Lobby
