= Politics of Western Australia =

Overview of Western Australia politics

Western Australia politics takes place in context of a constitutional monarchy with a bicameral parliamentary system, and like other Australian states, Western Australia is part of the federation known as the Commonwealth of Australia.

The main parties are the governing Labor Party and the two Opposition parties (the National Party and the Liberal Party). Other minor political parties include the Greens, Western Australia Party, Shooters, Fishers and Farmers Party, Liberal Democratic Party, Legalise Cannabis WA Party, Pauline Hanson's One Nation and Australian Christians. The other currently registered parties are Animal Justice Party, Democratic Labour Party, and Sustainable Australia Party – Anti-corruption.

== Premier of Western Australia ==
The premier of Western Australia is the head of government of the state of Western Australia. The role of premier at a state level is similar to the role of the prime minister of Australia at a federal level. The premier leads the executive branch of the Government of Western Australia and is accountable to the Parliament of Western Australia. The premier is appointed by the governor of Western Australia. By convention, the governor appoints as premier whoever has the support of the majority of the Western Australian Legislative Assembly. In practice, this means that the premier is the leader of the political party or group of parties with a majority of seats in the Legislative Assembly (lower house). Since Western Australia achieved self-governance in 1890, there have been 31 premiers. Roger Cook is the current premier, having been appointed to the position on 8 June 2023.

== State government ==
The nominal head of the Government of Western Australia is the King of Australia, represented in the state by the Governor of Western Australia. Legislative power rests with the Crown and the two houses of the Parliament of Western Australia. The powers and responsibilities of the parliament are defined in the Constitution Act 1889.

== Parliament of Western Australia ==
The Parliament of Western Australia is bicameral, consisting of a lower and an upper house.

The Western Australian Legislative Assembly (lower house) is composed of 59 members of parliament, each of whom represent a single electoral district and are elected using a preferential voting system. The Legislative Assembly sits for fixed four-year terms. The leader of the party with a majority in the Legislative Assembly (or with the confidence of the Assembly) is appointed by the Governor as the premier of Western Australia.

The Western Australian Legislative Council (upper house) has 36 members (or MLCs), representing six electoral regions. Six members are elected for each province using a proportional voting system.

General elections are held every four years, electing the entire Legislative Assembly and Legislative Council. The next state election is scheduled for March 2025.

== Federal politics ==
Western Australian seats in the Australian Parliament
Political party	House of Representatives	Senate
ALP	9	5
Liberal	5	5
WA Nationals	0	0
Greens	0	2
Independent	1	0
Source: Australian Electoral Commission

Western Australia is divided into 15 federal electoral divisions, each represented by a seat in the Australian House of Representatives. Like other Australian states, Western Australia is represented by twelve Senators in the Australian Senate, with six of those Senators elected for two three-year Senate terms at each half-Senate election.

Historically, most federal elections have already been "decided" (Note: Officially, the results of an election are declared by the Australian Electoral Commission only after all votes in all states have been counted. However it is common practice for the media, and the political parties themselves, to declare a winner based on the votes counted thus far.) by the time the polls close in Western Australia. (Note: Polls close at 6pm local time, and vote counting starts in each state when polls are closed. WA has about 10% of Australia's population and is 1 1/2 hours behind South Australia and the Northern Territory, 2 hours behind the 80% of the population in the eastern states (plus 1 hour in summer, for the majority of states that observe daylight saving time, when WA does not). Consequently, when the results from states other than WA strongly favour either of the two major parties, the overall national "winner" can be determined independently of WA's results, even before WA's polls close.) The only times since the mid-20th century when the state has decided an election were:

- 1998, when the first returns from the state assured a second term for John Howard
- 2010, when the victory of a state Nationals candidate who did not identify with the federal party allowed Julia Gillard to stay in office with a minority government
- 2022, when significant swings to Labor in a number of electorates helped Anthony Albanese become prime minister

== Referendum results in Western Australia ==
As of 2024, the most recent state referendum in Western Australia was in 2009.

Year	No.	Name	National voters	States	WA
1906	1	Senate Elections	82.65%	6:0	78.93%
1910	2	State Debts	54.95%	5:1	72.80%
1910	3	Surplus Revenue	49.04%	3:3	61.74%
1911	4	Trade and Commerce	39.42%	1:5	54.86%
1911	5	Monopolies	39.89%	1:5	55.84%
1913	6	Trade and Commerce	49.38%	3:3	52.86%
1913	7	Corporations	49.33%	3:3	52.84%
1913	8	Industrial Matters	49.33%	3:3	52.71%
1913	9	Trusts	49.78%	3:3	53.59%
1913	10	Monopolies	49.33%	3:3	53.19%
1913	11	Railway Disputes	49.13%	3:3	52.38%
1919	12	Legislative Powers	49.65%	3:3	51.75%
1919	13	Monopolies	48.64%	3:3	53.99%
1926	14	Industry and Commerce	43.50%	2:4	29.29%
1926	15	Essential Services	42.80%	2:4	25.90%
1928	16	State Debts	74.30%	6:0	57.53%
1937	17	Aviation	53.56%	2:4	47.58%
1937	18	Marketing	36.26%	0:6	27.77%
1944	19	Post-War Reconstruction and Democratic Rights	45.99%	2:4	52.25%
1946	20	Social Services	54.39%	6:0	62.26%
1946	21	Marketing	50.57%	3:3	56.21%
1946	22	Industrial Employment	50.30%	3:3	55.74%
1948	23	Rents and Prices	40.66%	0:6	38.59%
1951	24	Communists and Communism	49.44%	3:3	55.09%
1967	25	Parliament	40.25%	1:5	29.05%
1967	26	Aboriginals	90.77%	6:0	80.95%
1973	27	Prices	43.81%	0:6	31.90%
1973	28	Incomes	34.42%	0:6	25.21%
1974	29	Simultaneous Elections	48.30%	1:5	44.07%
1974	30	Mode of Altering the Constitution	47.99%	1:5	42.53%
1974	31	Democratic Elections	47.20%	1:5	42.86%
1974	32	Local Government Bodies	46.85%	1:5	40.67%
1977	33	Simultaneous Elections	62.22%	3:3	48.47%
1977	34	Senate Casual Vacancies	73.32%	6:0	57.11%
1977	35	Referendums	77.72%	6:0	72.62%
1977	36	Retirement of Judges	80.10%	6:0	78.37%
1984	37	Terms of Senators	50.64%	2:4	46.47%
1984	38	Interchange of Powers	47.06%	0:6	44.28%
1988	39	Parliamentary Terms	32.92%	0:6	30.67%
1988	40	Fair Elections	37.60%	0:6	32.02%
1988	41	Local Government	33.62%	0:6	29.76%
1988	42	Rights and Freedoms	30.79%	0:6	28.14%
1999	43	Establishment of Republic	45.13%	0:6	41.48%
1999	44	Preamble	39.34%	0:6	34.73%
2023 (Note: Results for this referendum are preliminary, and percentages may change, however the result is not expected to change.)	45	Aboriginal and Torres Strait Islander Voice	39.24%	0:6	36.01%

== Notable Western Australia political figures ==
- John Forrest – first premier of Western Australia
- Edith Cowan – first Australian woman to serve as a member of parliament
- John Curtin – first and only Prime Minister of Australia to represent an electorate outside the eastern states
- Carmen Lawrence – first woman to become premier of a state of the Commonwealth of Australia
- Jo Vallentine – first person in the world elected to a parliament on a nuclear disarmament platform
- Mark McGowan – former premier of Western Australia
- Julie Bishop – first woman to be Foreign Minister and deputy leader of the federal Liberal Party
- Mia Davies – first woman to lead a branch of the Nationals at state or federal level and become State Opposition leader
- Ben Wyatt – first Aboriginal treasurer in an Australian state or federal government
- Ken Wyatt – first Aboriginal member of the House of Representatives and the first Indigenous federal minister
- Anne Aly – first female federal parliamentarian of Muslim faith
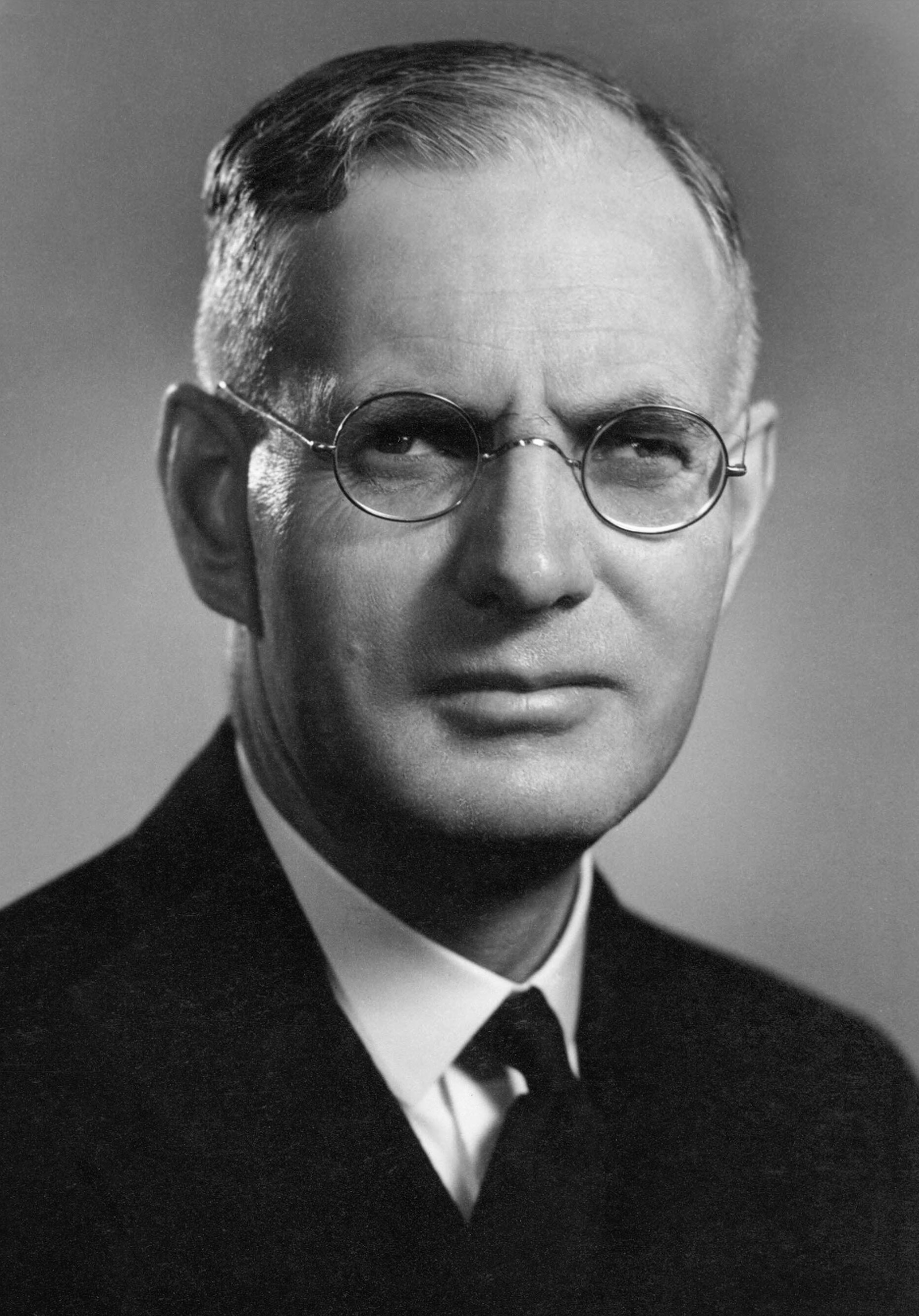
John Curtin

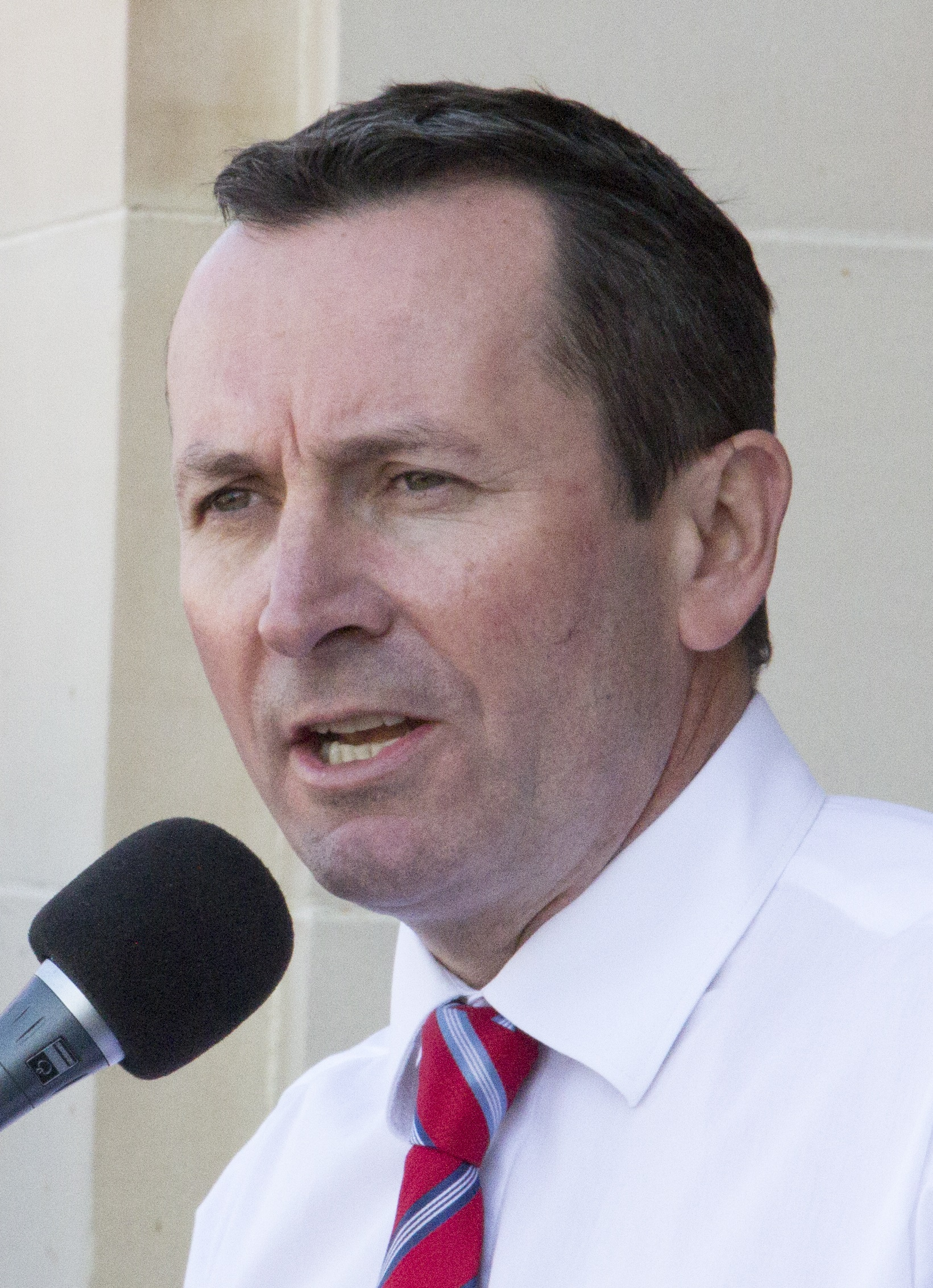
Mark McGowan

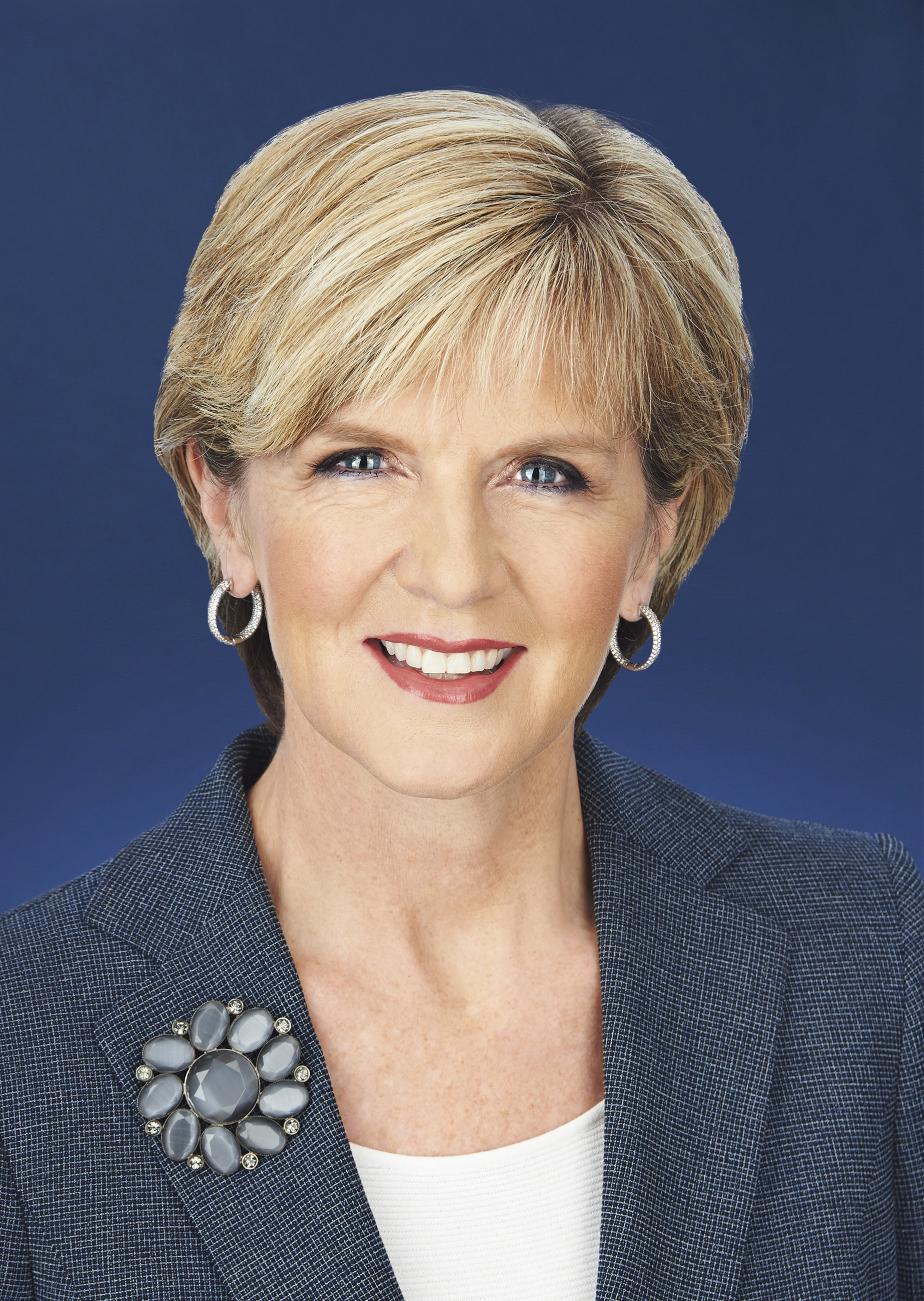
Julie Bishop

== Recent state election results ==
	Primary vote		
	ALP	L+NP	Oth.
2001 Western Australian state election	37.24%	34.42%	28.34%
2005 Western Australian state election	41.88%	39.33%	18.78%
2008 Western Australian state election	35.84%	43.26%	20.91%
2013 Western Australian state election	33.13%	53.15%	13.7%
2017 Western Australian state election	42.20%	36.63%	21.18%
2021 Western Australian state election	59.92%	25.3%	14.78%
2025 Western Australian state election	41.43%	33.17%	25.39%

== See also ==
- Secessionism in Western Australia
- Electoral results for the Australian Senate in Western Australia
