= Wapol (disambiguation) =

Wapol may refer to:

- Wapol, a fictional character from the One Piece manga series
- Politics of Western Australia, abbreviated online as "Wapol"
- Western Australia Police Force
- Wapol, the old English word for Marsh
