= 1913 Australian referendum (Trusts) =

Unsuccessful Australian referendum

1913 Australian Trusts referendum
- 31 May 1913
- Do you approve of the proposed law for the alteration of the Constitution entitled — "Constitution Alteration (Trusts) 1912" ?

Results
| Choice | Votes | % |
|---|---|---|
| Yes | 967,331 | 49.78% |
| No | 975,943 | 50.22% |
| Valid votes | 1,943,274 | 95.69% |
| Invalid or blank votes | 87,496 | 4.31% |
| Total votes | 2,030,770 | 100.00% |
| Registered voters/turnout | 2,760,216 | 73.57% |

The Constitution Alteration (Trusts) Bill 1912, was an unsuccessful referendum held in 1913 that sought to alter the Australian Constitution to give the Commonwealth legislative power in respect to trusts.

== Question ==
Do you approve of the proposed law for the alteration of the Constitution entitled 'Constitution Alteration (Trusts) 1912'?

== Proposed Changes to the Constitution ==
The proposal was to alter the text of section 51 of the Constitution to read as follows: (substituted text in bold)

51. The Parliament shall, subject to this Constitution, have Legislative power to make laws for the peace, order, and good government of the Commonwealth with respect to:

(xl.) Trusts, combinations, and monopolies in relation to the production, manufacture, or supply of goods, or the supply of services.

== Results ==
The referendum was not approved by a majority of voters, and a majority of the voters was achieved in only three states. (Note: Handbook of the 44th Parliament (2014) "Part 5 - Referendums and Plebiscites - Referendum results". Parliamentary Library of Australia.)

Result
| State | Electoral roll | Ballots issued | For | | Against | | Informal |
| State | Electoral roll | Ballots issued | Vote | % | Vote | % | Informal |
|---|---|---|---|---|---|---|---|
| New South Wales | 1,036,187 | 717,855 | 319,150 | 47.12 | 358,155 | **52.88** | 39,294 |
| Victoria | 830,391 | 626,861 | 301,729 | 49.71 | 305,268 | **50.29** | 19,536 |
| Queensland | 363,082 | 280,525 | 147,871 | **54.78** | 122,088 | 45.22 | 10,345 |
| South Australia | 244,026 | 195,463 | 96,400 | **51.67** | 90,185 | 48.33 | 8,661 |
| Western Australia | 179,784 | 132,149 | 67,342 | **53.59** | 58,312 | 46.41 | 6,162 |
| Tasmania | 106,746 | 80,398 | 314,839 | 45.38 | 41,935 | **54.62** | 3,498 |
| Total for Commonwealth | 2,760,216 | 2,033,251 | 967,331 | 49.78 | 975,943 | **50.22** | 87,496 |
| Results | Obtained majority in three states and an overall minority of 8,612 votes. **Not carried** | | | | | | |

== Discussion ==
The 1911 referendum asked a single question that dealt with the acquisition of monopolies. This resolution separated laws in relation to monopolies and the acquisition of monopolies into different questions. Like its forebear, neither resolution was carried. On each of the many occasions a similar question was asked at a referendum the public decided not to vest power in the Commonwealth over these matters.

- 1911 referendum on monopolies

== See also ==
- Politics of Australia
- History of Australia
