= 1919 Australian referendum (Monopolies) =

Australian Nationalisation of Industries referendum, 1919
19 December 1919
- Do you approve of the proposed law for the alteration of the Constitution entitled — "Constitution Alteration (Nationalisation of Monopolies) 1919" ?
- Outcome: Amendment Failed

Results
Choice	Votes	%
Yes	813,880	48.64%
No	859,451	51.36%
Valid votes	1,673,331	82.39%
Invalid or blank votes	357,580	17.61%
Total votes	2,030,911	100.00%
Registered voters/turnout	2,849,862	71.26%

The Constitution Alteration (Nationalization of Monopolies) Bill 1919, was an unsuccessful Australian referendum seeking to alter the Australian Constitution to extend the government's power to legislate in respect of monopolies. The question was put to a referendum in 1919, held in conjunction with the 1919 federal election.

== Question ==
Do you approve of the proposed law for the alteration of the Constitution entitled —

"Constitution Alteration (Nationalisation of Monopolies) 1919"?

== Prosposed Changes to the Constituation ==
The proposal was to alter the text of section 51 of the Constitution as reads as follows:

51a.—(1.) The Parliament shall have power to make laws for carrying on by or under the control of the Commonwealth, the industry or business of producing, manufacturing, or supplying any specified goods, or of supplying any specified services, and for acquiring for that purpose on just terms the assets and goodwill of the industry or business, where each House of the Parliament has in the same Session, by resolution passed by an absolute majority of its members, referred to the High Court, for inquiry and report by a Justice thereof, the question whether the industry or business is the subject of a monopoly, and where, after the report of the Justice has been received, each House of the Parliament has, in one Session, by resolution passed by an absolute majority of its members, declared that the industry or business is the subject of a monopoly.

== Results ==
Result (Note: Handbook of the 44th Parliament (2014) "Part 5 - Referendums and Plebiscites - Referendum results". Parliamentary Library of Australia.)
State	Electoral roll	Ballots issued	For		Against		Informal
State	Electoral roll	Ballots issued	Vote	%	Vote	%	Informal
New South Wales	1,079,439	717,565	227,156	38.31	365,847	61.69	124,330
Victoria	837,408	638,098	324,343	63.29	188,129	36.71	124,834
Queensland	389,200	330,231	162,062	56.92	122,650	43.08	45,209
South Australia	268,235	178,092	38,503	25.54	112,259	74.46	27,203
Western Australia	163,544	103,235	45,285	53.99	38,584	46.01	19,019
Tasmania	112,036	65,716	16,531	34.08	31,982	65.92	16,985
Total for Commonwealth	2,849,862	2,032,937	813,880	48.64	859,451	51.36	357,580
Results	Obtained majority in three states and an overall minority of 45,571 votes. Not carried						

== Discussion ==
The 1919 Australian Referendum on Monopolies was the third and final time that such a question would be asked and put to voter, ultimately failing to pass each time.

- 1911 referendum on trade and commerce, industrial relations and monopolies
- 1913 referendum on monopolies

== See also ==
- Referendums in Australia
- Politics of Australia
