= 1913 Australian referendum (Railway Disputes) =

1913 Australian Railway Disputes referendum
- 31 May 1913
- Do you approve of the proposed law for the alteration of the Constitution entitled — "Constitution Alteration (Railway Disputes) 1912" ?

Results
| Choice | Votes | % |
|---|---|---|
| Yes | 956,358 | 49.13% |
| No | 990,046 | 50.87% |
| Valid votes | 1,946,404 | 95.85% |
| Invalid or blank votes | 84,366 | 4.15% |
| Total votes | 2,030,770 | 100.00% |
| Registered voters/turnout | 2,760,216 | 73.57% |

The Constitution Alteration (Railways Disputes) Bill 1912 was an unsuccessful referendum held in 1913 that sought to alter the Australian Constitution to give the Commonwealth legislative power over industrial relations in the state railway services. The question was put to a referendum in the 1913 Australian referendum.

== Question ==
Do you approve of the proposed law for the alteration of the Constitution entitled 'Constitution Alteration (Railway Disputes) 1912'?

== Proposed Changes to the Constitution ==
The proposal was to alter the text of section 51 of the Constitution to read as follows: (substituted text in bold)

51. The Parliament shall, subject to this Constitution, have Legislative power to make laws for the peace, order, and good government of the Commonwealth with respect to:

(xxxv.A.) Conciliation and arbitration for prevention and settlement of industrial disputes in relation to employment in the railway service of a State.

== Results ==
The referendum was not approved by a majority of voters, and a majority of the voters was achieved in only three states. (Note: Handbook of the 44th Parliament (2014) "Part 5 - Referendums and Plebiscites - Referendum results". Parliamentary Library of Australia.)

Result
| State | Electoral roll | Ballots issued | For | | Against | | Informal |
| State | Electoral roll | Ballots issued | Vote | % | Vote | % | Informal |
|---|---|---|---|---|---|---|---|
| New South Wales | 1,036,187 | 717,855 | 316,928 | 46.70 | 361,743 | **53.30** | 37,928 |
| Victoria | 830,391 | 626,861 | 296,255 | 48.79 | 310,921 | **51.21** | 19,357 |
| Queensland | 363,082 | 280,525 | 146,521 | **54.19** | 123,859 | 45.81 | 9,924 |
| South Australia | 244,026 | 195,463 | 96,072 | **51.28** | 91,262 | 48.72 | 7,912 |
| Western Australia | 179,784 | 132,149 | 65,957 | **52.38** | 59,965 | 47.62 | 5,894 |
| Tasmania | 106,746 | 80,398 | 34,625 | 45.01 | 42,296 | **54.99** | 3,351 |
| Total for Commonwealth | 2,760,216 | 2,033,251 | 956,358 | 49.13 | 990,046 | **50.87** | 84,366 |
| Results | Obtained majority in three states and an overall minority of 33,688 votes. **Not carried** | | | | | | |

== Discussion ==
The 1911 referendum asked a single question that dealt with trade and commerce, corporations and industrial matters. This was an additional resolution that went beyond the previous proposal to directly address industrial disputes in the state railways. Like its forebear, none of these resolutions were carried. On each of the many occasions a similar question was asked at a referendum the public decided not to vest power in the Commonwealth over these matters.

- 1911 referendum on trade and commerce

== See also ==
- Politics of Australia
- History of Australia
