= 1911 Australian referendum =

The 1911 Australian referendum was held on 26 April 1911. It contained two referendum questions.

Result (Note: Handbook of the 44th Parliament (2014) "Part 5 - Referendums and Plebiscites - Referendum results". Parliamentary Library of Australia.)
Question	NSW	Vic	Qld	SA	WA	Tas	States in favour	Voters in favour	Result
(4) Trade and Commerce	No	No	No	No	Yes	No	1:5	39%	Not carried
(5) Nationalisation of Monopolies	No	No	No	No	Yes	No	1:5	40%	Not carried

== Results in detail ==
=== Trade and Commerce ===
Question: Do you approve of the proposed law for the alteration of the Constitution entitled "Constitution Alteration (Legislative Powers) 1910"?

Result
State	Electoral roll	Ballots issued	For		Against		Informal
State	Electoral roll	Ballots issued	Vote	%	Vote	%	Informal
New South Wales	868,194	384,188	135,968	36.11	240,605	63.89	7,396
Victoria	723,377	448,566	170,288	38.64	270,390	61.36	7,554
Queensland	293,003	162,135	69,552	43.75	89,420	56.25	3,002
South Australia	216,027	133,802	50,358	38.07	81,904	61.93	1,374
Western Australia	138,697	61,482	33,043	54.86	27,185	45.14	870
Tasmania	102,326	58,053	24,147	42.11	33,200	57.89	673
Total for Commonwealth	2,341,624	1,248,226	483,356	39.42	742,704	60.58	20,869
Results	Obtained majority in one state and an overall minority of 259,348 votes. Not carried.						

This section is an excerpt from 1911 Australian referendum (Trade and Commerce) § Results

=== Monopolies ===
Question: Do you approve of the proposed law for the alteration of the Constitution entitled "Constitution Alteration (Monopolies) 1910"?

Result
State	Electoral roll	Ballots issued	For		Against		Informal
State	Electoral roll	Ballots issued	Vote	%	Vote	%	Informal
New South Wales	868,194	384,188	138,237	36.72	238,177	63.28	7,618
Victoria	723,377	448,566	171,453	38.95	268,743	61.05	8,041
Queensland	293,003	162,135	70,259	44.26	88,472	55.74	3,200
South Australia	216,027	133,802	50,835	38.42	81,479	61.58	1,344
Western Australia	138,697	61,482	33,592	55.84	26,561	44.16	898
Tasmania	102,326	58,053	24,292	42.43	32,960	57.57	753
Total for Commonwealth	2,341,624	1,248,226	488,668	39.89	736,392	60.11	21,854
Results	Obtained majority in one state and an overall minority of 247,724 votes. Not carried						

This section is an excerpt from 1911 Australian referendum (Monopolies) § Results

== See also ==
- Referendums in Australia
- Politics of Australia
- History of Australia
