= 1919 Australian referendum =

Unsuccessful proposals to expand the Commonwealth powers

The 1919 Australian referendum was held on 13 December 1919. It contained two referendum questions. The referendums were held in conjunction with the 1919 federal election.

Results (Note: Handbook of the 44th Parliament (2014) "Part 5 - Referendums and Plebiscites - Referendum results". Parliamentary Library of Australia.)
Question	NSW	Vic	Qld	SA	WA	Tas	States in favour	Voters in favour	Result
(12) Legislative Powers	No	Yes	Yes	No	Yes	No	3:3	49.7%	Not carried
(13) Nationalisation of Monopolies	No	Yes	Yes	No	Yes	No	3:3	48.6%	Not carried

== Results in detail ==
=== Legislative Powers ===
Question: Do you approve of the proposed law for the alteration of the Constitution entitled 'Constitution Alteration (Legislative Powers) 1919'?

Result
State	Electoral roll	Ballots issued	For		Against		Informal
State	Electoral roll	Ballots issued	Vote	%	Vote	%	Informal
New South Wales	1,079,439	717,565	259,751	39.95	390,450	60.05	67,132
Victoria	837,408	638,098	369,210	64.65	201,869	35.35	66,227
Queensland	389,200	330,231	175,225	57.35	130,299	42.65	24,397
South Australia	268,235	178,092	40,520	25.28	119,789	74.72	17,656
Western Australia	163,544	103,235	48,142	51.75	44,892	48.25	9,854
Tasmania	112,036	65,716	18,509	33.43	36,861	66.57	10,128
Total for Commonwealth	2,849,862	2,032,937	911,357	49.65	924,160	50.35	195,394
Results	Obtained majority in three states and an overall minority of 12,803 votes. Not carried						

This section is an excerpt from 1919 Australian referendum (Legislative Powers) § Results

=== Monopolies ===
Question: Do you approve of the proposed law for the alteration of the Constitution entitled 'Constitution Alteration (Nationalisation of Monopolies) 1919'?

Result
State	Electoral roll	Ballots issued	For		Against		Informal
State	Electoral roll	Ballots issued	Vote	%	Vote	%	Informal
New South Wales	1,079,439	717,565	227,156	38.31	365,847	61.69	124,330
Victoria	837,408	638,098	324,343	63.29	188,129	36.71	124,834
Queensland	389,200	330,231	162,062	56.92	122,650	43.08	45,209
South Australia	268,235	178,092	38,503	25.54	112,259	74.46	27,203
Western Australia	163,544	103,235	45,285	53.99	38,584	46.01	19,019
Tasmania	112,036	65,716	16,531	34.08	31,982	65.92	16,985
Total for Commonwealth	2,849,862	2,032,937	813,880	48.64	859,451	51.36	357,580
Results	Obtained majority in three states and an overall minority of 45,571 votes. Not carried						

This section is an excerpt from 1919 Australian referendum (Monopolies) § Results

== See also ==
- Referendums in Australia
- Politics of Australia
- History of Australia
