= 1926 Australian referendum (Essential Services) =

Australian Essential Services referendum 1926
| 4 September 1926 |
- Do you approve of the proposed law for the alteration of the Constitution entitled — "Constitution Alteration (Essential Services) 1926" ?
- Outcome: Amendment Failed

Results
| Choice | Votes | % |
|---|---|---|
| Yes | 1,195,502 | 42.80% |
| No | 1,597,793 | 57.20% |
| Valid votes | 2,793,295 | 94.23% |
| Invalid or blank votes | 171,089 | 5.77% |
| Total votes | 2,964,384 | 100.00% |
| Registered voters/turnout | 3,254,952 | 91.07% |

The Constitution Alteration (Essential Services) Bill 1926, was an unsuccessful referendum held in 1926 that sought to alter the Australian Constitution to give the Commonwealth legislative power to protect the public from any actual or probable interruption of essential services.

== Question ==
Do you approve of the proposed law for the alteration of the Constitution entitled 'Constitution Alteration (Essential Services) 1926'?

== Proposed Changes to the Constitution ==
The proposal was to alter section 51 of the Constitution as follows:

Section fifty-one of the Constitution is altered by inserting after paragraph (v.) the following paragraph:—

(v.) a. Protecting the interests of the public in case of actual or probable interruption of any essential service.

== Results ==
The referendum was not approved by a majority of voters, and a majority of the voters was achieved in only two states, New South Wales and Queensland. (Note: Handbook of the 44th Parliament (2014) "Part 5 - Referendums and Plebiscites - Referendum results". Parliamentary Library of Australia.)

Result
| State | Electoral roll | Ballots issued | For | | Against | | Informal |
| State | Electoral roll | Ballots issued | Vote | % | Vote | % | Informal |
|---|---|---|---|---|---|---|---|
| New South Wales | 1,241,635 | 1,131,656 | 545,270 | 50.39 | 536,734 | 49.61 | 49,652 |
| Victoria | 968,861 | 888,661 | 296,548 | 35.55 | 537,560 | 64.45 | 54,553 |
| Queensland | 440,632 | 399,664 | 188,473 | 50.56 | 184,320 | 49.44 | 26,871 |
| South Australia | 303,054 | 281,492 | 81,966 | 31.32 | 179,740 | 68.68 | 19,786 |
| Western Australia | 190,286 | 164,555 | 39,566 | 25.90 | 113,222 | 74.10 | 11,767 |
| Tasmania | 110,484 | 98,356 | 43,679 | 48.59 | 46,217 | 51.41 | 8,460 |
| Total for Commonwealth | 3,254,952 | 2,964,384 | 1,195,502 | 42.80 | 1,597,793 | 57.20 | 171,089 |
| Results | Obtained majority in two states and an overall minority of 402,291 votes. Not carried | | | | | | |
