= 1913 Australian referendum (Monopolies) =

1913 Australian Nationalization of Monopolies referendum
- 31 May 1913
- Do you approve of the proposed law for the alteration of the Constitution entitled — "Constitution Alteration (Nationalization of Monopolies) 1912" ?

Results
Choice	Votes	%
Yes	917,165	49.33%
No	941,947	50.67%
Valid votes	1,859,112	91.55%
Invalid or blank votes	171,658	8.45%
Total votes	2,030,770	100.00%
Registered voters/turnout	2,760,216	73.57%

The Constitution Alteration (Nationalization of Monopolies) Bill 1912, was an unsuccessful referendum held in 1913 that sought to alter the Australian Constitution to give the Commonwealth legislative power in respect to monopolies.

== Question ==
Do you approve of the proposed law for the alteration of the Constitution entitled 'Constitution Alteration (Nationalization of Monopolies) 1912'?

== Proposed Changes to the Constitution ==
The proposal was to alter the text of section 51 of the Constitution to read as follows: (substituted text in bold)

51a. (1) When each House of the Parliament, in the same session, has by resolution, passed by an absolute majority of its members, declared that the industry or business of producing, manufacturing, or supplying any specified services, is the subject of a monopoly, the Parliament shall have power to make laws for carrying on the industry or business by or under the control of the Commonwealth, and acquiring for that purpose on just terms any property used in connexion with the industry or business.

(2) This section shall not apply to any industry or business conducted or carried on by the Government of a State or any public authority constituted under a State.

== Results ==
The referendum was not approved by a majority of voters, and a majority of the voters was achieved in only three states. (Note: Handbook of the 44th Parliament (2014) "Part 5 - Referendums and Plebiscites - Referendum results". Parliamentary Library of Australia.)

Result
State	Electoral roll	Ballots issued	For		Against		Informal
State	Electoral roll	Ballots issued	Vote	%	Vote	%	Informal
New South Wales	1,036,187	717,855	301,192	46.85	341,724	**53.15**	73,683
Victoria	830,391	626,861	287,379	49.07	298,326	**50.93**	40,828
Queensland	363,082	280,525	139,019	**54.17**	117,609	45.83	23,676
South Australia	244,026	195,463	91,411	**51.26**	86,915	48.74	16,920
Western Australia	179,784	132,149	64,988	**53.19**	57,184	46.81	9,644
Tasmania	106,746	80,398	33,176	45.22	40,189	**54.78**	6,907
Total for Commonwealth	2,760,216	2,033,251	917,165	49.33	941,947	**50.67**	171,658
Results	Obtained majority in three states and an overall minority of 24,782 votes. **Not carried**						

== Discussion ==
The 1911 referendum asked a single question that dealt with the acquisition of monopolies. This resolution separated laws in relation to monopolies and the acquisition of monopolies into different questions. Like its forebear, neither resolution was carried. On each of the many occasions a similar question was asked at a referendum the public decided not to vest power in the Commonwealth over these matters.

- 1911 referendum on monopolies

== See also ==
- Politics of Australia
- History of Australia
