= 1911 Australian referendum (Monopolies) =

1911 Australian Monopolies referendum
- 26 April 1911
- Do you approve of the proposed law for the alteration of the Constitution entitled — "Constitution Alteration (Monopolies) 1910" ?
- Outcome: Amendment Failed

Results
Choice	Votes	%
Yes	488,668	39.86%
No	737,392	60.14%
Valid votes	1,226,060	98.25%
Invalid or blank votes	21,854	1.75%
Total votes	1,247,914	100.00%
Registered voters/turnout	2,341,624	53.29%

The Constitution Alteration (Monopolies) Bill 1910, was put to voters for approval in a referendum held in 1911 that sought to alter the Australian Constitution to give the Commonwealth power to nationalise any corporation deemed by both houses of parliament to be a monopoly.

== Question ==
Do you approve of the proposed law for the alteration of the Constitution entitled 'Constitution Alteration (Monopolies) 1910'?

== Proposed Changes to the Constitution ==
The proposal was to add section 51a to the Constitution to read as follows (substituted text in bold):

51a. When each House of the Parliament, in the same session, has by Resolution declared that the industry or business of producing manufacturing or supplying any specified goods, or of supplying any specified services, is the subject of a monopoly, the Parliament shall have power to make laws for carrying on the industry or business by or under the control of the Commonwealth, and acquiring for that purpose on just terms any property used in connexion with the industry or business.

== Results ==
The referendum was not approved by a majority of voters, and a majority of the voters was achieved in only one state, Western Australia. (Note: Handbook of the 44th Parliament (2014) "Part 5 - Referendums and Plebiscites - Referendum results". Parliamentary Library of Australia.)

Result
State	Electoral roll	Ballots issued	For		Against		Informal
State	Electoral roll	Ballots issued	Vote	%	Vote	%	Informal
New South Wales	868,194	384,188	138,237	36.72	238,177	**63.28**	7,618
Victoria	723,377	448,566	171,453	38.95	268,743	**61.05**	8,041
Queensland	293,003	162,135	70,259	44.26	88,472	**55.74**	3,200
South Australia	216,027	133,802	50,835	38.42	81,479	**61.58**	1,344
Western Australia	138,697	61,482	33,592	**55.84**	26,561	44.16	898
Tasmania	102,326	58,053	24,292	42.43	32,960	**57.57**	753
Total for Commonwealth	2,341,624	1,248,226	488,668	39.89	736,392	**60.11**	21,854
Results	Obtained majority in one state and an overall minority of 247,724 votes. **Not carried**						

== Discussion ==
This was the first of many times that similar questions were asked at a referendum. On every occasion the public decided not to vest power in the government over monopolies.

- 1913 Australian Referendum (Monopolies)
- 1919 Australian Referendum (Monopolies)

== See also ==
- Referendums in
- Politics of Australia
- History of Australia
