= Daylight saving time in Australia =

Australian time zones during daylight-saving time (from southern spring to southern autumn)

Daylight saving time (DST) is currently observed in the Australian states of New South Wales, South Australia, Tasmania, and Victoria, as well as the Australian Capital Territory, Jervis Bay Territory and Norfolk Island. Other Australian jurisdictions – the states of Queensland and Western Australia, the Northern Territory and Australia's other external territories – do not observe daylight saving time.

Each state and territory determines whether or not to use daylight saving time. During World War I and World War II all states and territories had daylight saving by federal law, under the defence power in section 51 of the constitution. In 1967, Tasmania was the first state since the war to adopt daylight saving. In 1971, New South Wales, Queensland, South Australia, Victoria, and the Australian Capital Territory also adopted daylight saving, while Western Australia and the Northern Territory did not. Queensland abandoned daylight saving in 1972. Queensland and Western Australia have subsequently observed daylight saving on a trial basis on several occasions.

As a result of the inconsistent adoption of daylight saving, during the Australian summer the mainland's three standard time zones increase to five time zones. South Australia time diverges from Northern Territory time to become UTC+10:30, known as Central Daylight Time (CDT) or Australia Central Daylight Time (ACDT), while the time in the southeastern states diverges from Queensland time to become UTC+11:00, known as Eastern Daylight Time (EDT) or Australia Eastern Daylight Time (AEDT).

Officially, the change to and from DST takes place at 02:00 local standard time (which is 03:00 DST) on the appropriate Sunday. Of the states that observe DST, most began on the last Sunday in October, and ended on the last Sunday in March, until 2007. Tasmania, owing to its further southern latitude began DST earlier, on the first Sunday in October, and ended on the last Sunday in March. In the 2007–08 season, Tasmania started on the first Sunday in October whilst the ACT, NSW, Vic and SA started in the last Sunday in October. As part of the transition to earlier daylight saving, those states and Tasmania all finished on the first Sunday in April. For subsequent years, DST in the south-eastern states and SA now starts on the first Sunday in October, finishing on the first Sunday in April the next year. Western Australia was not affected by these changes to DST, being the only state in 2007–08 to observe daylight saving from the last Sunday in October to the last Sunday in March. However, since 2009, it is on Standard time all year round.

== Summary table ==
State/territory	Start of DST	UTC	End of DST	Notes and other mentions
Australian Capital Territory (ACT)	First Sunday in October (since 2008–09)	+11:00	First Sunday in April (2005–06 and since 2007–08)	Since 1971.
New South Wales (NSW) excluding Broken Hill	First Sunday in October (since 2008–09)	+11:00	First Sunday in April (2005–06 and since 2007–08)	Observed DST in 1917, 1942–1944, and since 1971.
Northern Territory (NT)	—N/a	+9:30	—N/a	Observed DST in 1917 and 1942–1944.
Queensland (QLD)	—N/a	+10:00	—N/a	Observed DST in 1917, 1942–1944, 1971–1972, and 1989–1992.
South Australia (SA) and Broken Hill	First Sunday in October (since 2008–09)	+10:30	First Sunday in April (2005–06 and since 2008–09)	Observed DST in 1917, 1942–1944, and since 1971.
Tasmania (TAS)	First Sunday in October (since 1992–93 except for 2000–01 when it began on the Last Sunday in August)	+11:00	First Sunday in April (2005–06 and since 2007–08)	Observed DST in 1916–1917, 1942–1944, and since 1967.
Victoria (VIC)	First Sunday in October (since 2008–09)	+11:00	First Sunday in April. (2005–06 and since 2007–08)	Observed DST in 1917, 1942–1944, and since 1971.
Western Australia (WA)	—N/a	+8:00	—N/a	Observed DST in 1917, 1942–1943, 1974–1975, 1983–1984, 1991–1992, and 2006–2009.

== Debate over daylight saving time – trials, referendums and politics ==
=== Queensland ===
Queensland had a particularly involved debate over daylight-saving time, with public opinion geographically divided. A referendum on daylight saving was held on 22 February 1992, following a three-year trial (1989/90 – 1991/92), and was defeated with a 54.5% 'no' vote. The referendum result displayed a distinct trend – that public opinion on daylight saving in Queensland is geographically divided, with the 'no' vote strongest in the north and west regional districts, while the 'yes' vote was strongest in the state's metropolitan south-east.

Since the early 2000s, there have been a number of petitions submitted to Queensland Parliament, lobbying for the introduction of daylight-saving time or for another referendum to be held. A petition in 2006 was signed by 62,232 people. In response to these petitions, then Queensland Premier Peter Beattie commissioned research to find out if daylight-saving time should be re-introduced into Queensland. Around this time, Beattie claimed that daylight-saving time in Queensland would increase the rate of skin cancer in the state, an unfounded claim for which there is no evidence according to the Queensland Cancer Fund.

In October 2007, the completed government-commissioned research was presented to a newly sworn-in Premier Anna Bligh, who ruled out holding a new referendum, despite the report indicating 59% of Queensland residents and 69% of South East Queenslanders to be in favour of adopting daylight-saving time.

In December 2008, the Daylight Saving for South East Queensland (DS4SEQ) political Party was officially registered, advocating the implementation of a dual-time zone arrangement for daylight saving time in South East Queensland while the remainder of the state maintains standard time. The party contested the March 2009 Queensland State election with 32 candidates and received around one percent of the statewide primary vote, equating to around 2.5% across the 32 electorates contested.

In early 2010, the DS4SEQ political party approached independent Member, Peter Wellington, to introduce a private member's Bill for daylight saving. As Wellington agreed with the principles of the DS4SEQ proposal, specifically the dual time zone arrangement, he drafted the Daylight Saving for South East Queensland Referendum Bill 2010 and tabled the Bill into Queensland Parliament on 14 April 2010. Wellington has called for a referendum to be held at the next State election on the introduction of daylight saving into south-east Queensland under a dual-time zone arrangement.

In response to this Bill, Premier of Queensland, Anna Bligh, announced a community consultation process, which resulted in over 74,000 respondents participating, 64 percent of whom voted in favour of a trial and 63% were in favour of holding a referendum. The decision announced by the Premier on 7 June 2010 was that her Government would not support the Bill, because regional Queenslanders were overwhelmingly opposed to daylight saving. The Bill was defeated in Queensland Parliament on 15 June 2011.

=== Western Australia ===
Western Australia also had a particularly involved debate over daylight-saving time, with the issue being put to a referendum four times, 1975, 1984, 1992 and 2009. All were defeated. Voters returned a "no" vote of 54.57% in 2009, the highest in all four referendums. Each referendum followed a trial period during which the state observed daylight saving time. The first three followed a one-year trial, while the 2006 Western Australian Daylight Saving Bill (No. 2) 2006 instituted a daylight-saving trial that began on 3 December 2006 and lasted for three years.

=== Special events ===
In 2000, all eastern jurisdictions that normally observe daylight-saving time – New South Wales, Victoria, the Australian Capital Territory and Tasmania – started daylight-saving time early, due to the 2000 Summer Olympics in Sydney. These jurisdictions changed on 27 August 2000. South Australia did not change until the regular time, which that year was on 29 October.

In 2006, all states that followed daylight-saving time (the above listed states plus South Australia) delayed the return to their respective Standard Times by a week, due to the 2006 Commonwealth Games in Melbourne. Daylight-saving time ended on 2 April 2006.

== History ==
1970 ABC interviews with Tasmanians about the introduction of Daylight Saving.

Daylight saving was first used in Australia during World War I, and was applied in all states. It was used again during World War II. A drought in Tasmania in 1967 led to the reintroduction of daylight saving in that state during the summer, which has been repeated every summer since then. In 1971, New South Wales, Victoria, Queensland, South Australia, and the Australian Capital Territory followed Tasmania by observing daylight saving. Western Australia and the Northern Territory did not. Queensland abandoned daylight saving time in 1972.

Until 2008, Tasmania commenced daylight saving on the first Sunday in October, while the other states began on the last Sunday in October and finished on the last Sunday in March. From 2008/09 daylight saving was extended another four weeks in NSW, Victoria, SA and the ACT, in addition to Tasmania, from the first Sunday in October to the first Sunday in April.

Queensland again trialled daylight between 1989 and 1992. A referendum on daylight saving was held on 22 February 1992, which resulted in 54.5% of voters rejecting its continuation. Regional and rural areas were strongly opposed, while those in the metropolitan areas of South East Queensland were in favour.

In December 2008, the Daylight Saving for South East Queensland (DS4SEQ) political party was officially registered, advocating the implementation of a dual-time zone arrangement, with daylight saving applying in South East Queensland while the rest of the state maintained standard time. The party contested the 2009 state election with 32 candidates and received around one percent of the statewide primary vote, equating to around 2.5% across the 32 electorates contested.

On 14 April 2010, after being approached by the Daylight Saving for South East Queensland (DS4SEQ) political party, Queensland Independent member Peter Wellington, introduced the Daylight Saving for South East Queensland Referendum Bill 2010 into Queensland Parliament, calling for a referendum to be held at the next State election on the introduction of daylight saving in South East Queensland under a dual-time zone arrangement. The bill was defeated on 15 June 2011.

In Western Australia, four referendums, in 1975, 1984, 1992 and 2009, have all rejected the introduction of daylight saving. In 2006, the Parliament of Western Australia approved a three-year daylight saving trial, to be followed by a referendum to decide whether DST should be put in place permanently. However, public opposition mounted during the first year of the trial, and the WA Nationals announced a public campaign to bring the referendum forward to 2007. The trial continued until the referendum, held on 16 May 2009. The result was another rejection of DST, by a larger margin compared to the three previous referendums. Although as previously the suburbs of the state capital, Perth, supported the proposal, it was by a much narrower margin than before with significant swings against it in several areas, most notably in the East Metropolitan region. As a result, the then Premier Colin Barnett said that the DST issue should not be considered for at least another 20 years.

Despite that, in September 2016 the Daylight Saving Party was established by brothers Brett and Wilson Tucker to contest seats in the Legislative Council at the upcoming 2017 state election. Tucker argued that in the seven years since the last referendum there had been a generational shift in Western Australia and that the fifth referendum would be successful. The party won 0.68% of the vote, or 9,209 votes statewide, but failed to win any seat in the Legislative Council. Wilson Tucker went on to win a seat in the Legislative Council at the 2021 election with only 0.18% of the primary vote.

The Northern Territory experimented with daylight saving in the early part of the 20th century. It was last used in 1944.

In September 2020, Monash University Professor of Diabetes Paul Zimmet claimed that the switch to daylight saving time caused an increase in heart attacks, road accidents, workplace accidents, and cognitive dysfunction, and could amplify the health problems during the COVID-19 pandemic. However, Premier of Victoria Daniel Andrews responded that daylight saving would be part of the forthcoming summer season.

Daylight saving was widely believed to be introduced as a consumer spending initiative by local councils and tourism boards throughout New South Wales.

== See also ==
- Time in Australia

== Sources ==
- Pearce, Chris (1 August 2017). "History of daylight saving time in Queensland". Queensland History Journal. 23 (6): 389–403. ISSN 1836-5477.
