= Referendums in Australia =

In Australia, referendums (also spelt referenda) are public votes held on important issues where the electorate may approve or reject a certain proposal. In contemporary usage, polls conducted on non-constitutional issues are known as plebiscites, with the term referendum being reserved solely for votes on constitutional changes, which is legally required to make a change to the Constitution of Australia.

In the past, however the terms were used interchangeably, with the non-constitutional 1916 Australian conscription referendum and the 2009 Western Australian daylight saving referendum being examples.

Voting in a referendum is compulsory for those on the electoral roll, in the same way that it is compulsory to vote in a general election. As of 2023, 45 nationwide referendums have been held, only eight of which have been carried. Of those eight, all but one had bi-partisan support. Since multiple referendum questions are often asked on the same ballot, there have only been 20 separate occasions that the Australian people have gone to the polls to vote on constitutional amendments—of which 8 have been concurrent with a federal election. There have also been three nationwide non-constitutional plebiscites (two on conscription and one on the national song), and one postal survey (on same-sex marriage).

== Federal referendums ==
=== Constitutional provisions ===
Section 128 of the Constitution specifies that alterations to the Constitution cannot be made without a public vote. A bill containing the amendment must first be passed by both houses of parliament or, in certain limited circumstances, by only one house of parliament. If the bill has only been passed in one house, the governor-general must, under the deadlock provision of section 128, then decide whether or not to submit the referendum to the people. By convention, this is done on the advice of the prime minister. Since the prime minister normally controls the House of Representatives, the effect of this convention is to make it virtually impossible for a referendum to be put to the people if approved by the Senate, but not the House.

If the bill to alter the Constitution is approved by both houses or satisfies the deadlock provision, the bill is submitted to the electors for approval. The referendum is conducted according to the Referendum (Machinery Provisions) Act 1984. If the bill is approved by an absolute majority of both houses, the Constitution provides that it must be submitted to the electors no less than two months but no later than six months after passage. However, this requirement has not always been complied with, with a proposed amendment in 2013 not proceeding to a vote despite the passage of legislation. There is no similar time limitation if the bill is approved by one House of the Commonwealth Parliament only.

To pass a referendum, the bill must ordinarily achieve a double majority: a majority of those voting nationwide, as well as separate majorities in a majority of states (i.e., 4 out of 6 states). This provision, which gives the small Australian states effectively a built-in veto, was one of those constitutional provisions accepted in order for the smaller colonies to agree to Federation. In circumstances where a state is significantly affected by a referendum (such as through an alteration of its borders or through a reduction of its representation), a majority of voters in that state must also agree to the change.

When a referendum question is carried, the amending bill is presented for royal assent by the governor-general.

=== Territories ===
Prior to the 1977 referendum, only electors in the six states could vote at a referendum. Since the 1977 amendment was carried, voters of the territories have been eligible to vote in referendums. Territory votes are now counted towards the national total but the territories do not count as states for the purpose of the requirement for a majority of states.

=== Alteration of states ===
Section 123 of the Constitution also requires that where the "limits of the State" are proposed to be altered by the relevant state and federal parliaments, the approval of a majority of the electors of that state is also required.

=== Other aspects ===
Voting for federal elections and referendums has been compulsory in Australia since 1924.

Non-constitutional plebiscites, are conducted by the government to decide a matter relating to ordinary statute law, an advisory question of policy, or as a prelude to the submission of a formal referendum question, rather than a binding and entrenched alteration (amendment) to the Constitution. Plebiscites can offer a variety of options, rather than a simple yes/no question. Four national plebiscites have been held as of 2017. Unlike in constitutional referendums, voting in previous plebiscites has been optional.

In 1998, the Howard government amended the Flags Act 1953 to require a plebiscite to change the Flag of Australia. There is some debate over whether such legislation is legally enforceable, and a new parliament could simply amend or repeal the legislation at any time.

=== Success rate ===
Australians have rejected most proposals for constitutional amendments, approving only 8 out of 45 referendums submitted to them since federation. Noting the difficulty of the referendum process, then prime minister Robert Menzies said in 1951: "The truth of the matter is that to get an affirmative vote from the Australian people on a referendum proposal is one of the labours of Hercules."

Of forty-five referendums, there have been five instances – in 1937, twice in 1946, and once each in 1977 and 1984 – where a national Yes vote has been achieved but failed to win a majority of states. In three of these instances, the referendum received a majority in three states. The converse situation, where there is a majority of states but not an overall majority, has not yet occurred.

Apart from 1937, in which Victoria and Queensland were the only two states in favour, only these cases have followed a consistent pattern: a Yes vote in the two most populous states, New South Wales and Victoria, and a No vote in most or all of the other states. The rejection of these referendums was due to the less populous states voting contrary to the most populous states.

A contributing factor to the predominance of the No vote comes from the unwillingness of the Australian voters to extend the powers of the federal government. Although none of the votes was over additional powers over commerce and industry granted to the government, at least two successful referendums can be characterised as giving the Commonwealth more powers: in 1946, the Commonwealth was given power to make laws with respect to a range of health and welfare services; and in 1967, the Commonwealth was given a power to make laws with respect to Indigenous Australians. The government hoped that support for this amendment would encourage electors to vote yes for the second referendum submitted at the same time, which would have abolished the nexus between the numbers of members in each House. However, this second law was not approved by the electors.

== List of referendums and plebiscites ==
Each question asked electors to answer "Yes" or "No", except for the national song plebiscite where electors were asked to choose between four songs.

Additionally, legislation authorising a referendum to allow the federal government to directly fund local councils passed in 2013, however the government decided not to proceed with a vote.

=== Results of referendums ===
| Year | No. | Name | National voters | States | NSW | VIC | QLD (Note: Queensland has historically assented to the most proposals, having approved 29 constitutional amendments compared to the mean of 17 assents.) | SA | WA | TAS (Note: Tasmania has historically assented to the fewest proposals, having approved 10 constitutional amendments compared to the mean of 17 assents.) | ACT (Note: Residents of the Australian Capital Territory and Northern Territory could not vote in referendums until the passing of the 1977 Referendums Constitutional Amendment. The votes of those territories are counted in the national total, but not toward the count of states which have received a majority.) | NT |
|---|---|---|---|---|---|---|---|---|---|---|---|---|
| 1906 | 1 | Senate Elections | 82.65% | 6:0 | 83.85% | 83.10% | 76.84% | 86.99% | 78.93% | 81.32% | —N/a | —N/a |
| 1910 | 2 | State Debts | 54.95% | 5:1 | 33.34% | 64.59% | 64.57% | 73.18% | 72.80% | 80.97% | —N/a | —N/a |
| 1910 | 3 | Surplus Revenue | 49.04% | 3:3 | 47.35% | 45.26% | 54.58% | 49.06% | 61.74% | 59.99% | —N/a | —N/a |
| 1911 | 4 | Trade and Commerce | 39.42% | 1:5 | 36.11% | 38.64% | 43.75% | 38.07% | 54.86% | 42.11% | —N/a | —N/a |
| 1911 | 5 | Monopolies | 39.89% | 1:5 | 36.72% | 38.95% | 44.26% | 38.42% | 55.84% | 42.43% | —N/a | —N/a |
| 1913 | 6 | Trade and Commerce | 49.38% | 3:3 | 46.93% | 49.12% | 54.34% | 51.32% | 52.86% | 45.16% | —N/a | —N/a |
| 1913 | 7 | Corporations | 49.33% | 3:3 | 46.79% | 49.14% | 54.31% | 51.34% | 52.84% | 45.08% | —N/a | —N/a |
| 1913 | 8 | Industrial Matters | 49.33% | 3:3 | 46.88% | 49.02% | 54.36% | 51.40% | 52.71% | 45.20% | —N/a | —N/a |
| 1913 | 9 | Trusts | 49.78% | 3:3 | 47.12% | 49.71% | 54.78% | 51.67% | 53.59% | 45.38% | —N/a | —N/a |
| 1913 | 10 | Monopolies | 49.33% | 3:3 | 46.85% | 49.07% | 54.17% | 51.26% | 53.19% | 45.22% | —N/a | —N/a |
| 1913 | 11 | Railway Disputes | 49.13% | 3:3 | 46.70% | 48.79% | 54.19% | 51.28% | 52.38% | 45.01% | —N/a | —N/a |
| 1919 | 12 | Legislative Powers | 49.65% | 3:3 | 39.95% | 64.65% | 57.35% | 25.28% | 51.75% | 33.43% | —N/a | —N/a |
| 1919 | 13 | Monopolies | 48.64% | 3:3 | 38.31% | 63.29% | 56.92% | 25.54% | 53.99% | 34.08% | —N/a | —N/a |
| 1926 | 14 | Industry and Commerce | 43.50% | 2:4 | 51.53% | 36.23% | 52.10% | 29.32% | 29.29% | 44.86% | —N/a | —N/a |
| 1926 | 15 | Essential Services | 42.80% | 2:4 | 50.39% | 35.55% | 50.56% | 31.32% | 25.90% | 48.59% | —N/a | —N/a |
| 1928 | 16 | State Debts | 74.30% | 6:0 | 64.47% | 87.78% | 88.60% | 62.68% | 57.53% | 66.89% | —N/a | —N/a |
| 1937 | 17 | Aviation | 53.56% | 2:4 | 47.25% | 65.10% | 61.87% | 40.13% | 47.58% | 38.94% | —N/a | —N/a |
| 1937 | 18 | Marketing | 36.26% | 0:6 | 33.76% | 46.58% | 38.78% | 20.83% | 27.77% | 21.88% | —N/a | —N/a |
| 1944 | 19 | Post-War Reconstruction and Democratic Rights | 45.99% | 2:4 | 45.44% | 49.31% | 36.52% | 50.64% | 52.25% | 38.92% | —N/a | —N/a |
| 1946 | 20 | Social Services | 54.39% | 6:0 | 54.00% | 55.98% | 51.26% | 51.73% | 62.26% | 50.58% | —N/a | —N/a |
| 1946 | 21 | Marketing | 50.57% | 3:3 | 51.83% | 52.37% | 45.74% | 48.74% | 56.21% | 42.55% | —N/a | —N/a |
| 1946 | 22 | Industrial Employment | 50.30% | 3:3 | 51.72% | 52.08% | 43.42% | 48.20% | 55.74% | 41.37% | —N/a | —N/a |
| 1948 | 23 | Rents and Prices | 40.66% | 0:6 | 41.66% | 44.63% | 30.80% | 42.15% | 38.59% | 35.45% | —N/a | —N/a |
| 1951 | 24 | Communists and Communism | 49.44% | 3:3 | 47.17% | 48.71% | 55.76% | 47.29% | 55.09% | 50.26% | —N/a | —N/a |
| 1967 | 25 | Parliament | 40.25% | 1:5 | 51.01% | 30.87% | 44.13% | 33.91% | 29.05% | 23.06% | —N/a | —N/a |
| 1967 | 26 | Aboriginals | 90.77% | 6:0 | 91.46% | 94.68% | 89.21% | 86.26% | 80.95% | 90.21% | —N/a | —N/a |
| 1973 | 27 | Prices | 43.81% | 0:6 | 48.55% | 45.18% | 38.47% | 41.16% | 31.90% | 38.22% | —N/a | —N/a |
| 1973 | 28 | Incomes | 34.42% | 0:6 | 40.31% | 33.44% | 31.70% | 28.25% | 25.21% | 28.31% | —N/a | —N/a |
| 1974 | 29 | Simultaneous Elections | 48.30% | 1:5 | 51.06% | 49.19% | 44.32% | 47.14% | 44.07% | 41.37% | —N/a | —N/a |
| 1974 | 30 | Mode of Altering the Constitution | 47.99% | 1:5 | 51.35% | 49.22% | 44.29% | 44.26% | 42.53% | 40.72% | —N/a | —N/a |
| 1974 | 31 | Democratic Elections | 47.20% | 1:5 | 50.55% | 47.71% | 43.70% | 44.11% | 42.86% | 40.81% | —N/a | —N/a |
| 1974 | 32 | Local Government Bodies | 46.85% | 1:5 | 50.79% | 47.38% | 43.68% | 42.52% | 40.67% | 40.03% | —N/a | —N/a |
| 1977 | 33 | Simultaneous Elections | 62.22% | 3:3 | 70.71% | 65.00% | 47.51% | 65.99% | 48.47% | 34.26% | —N/a | —N/a |
| 1977 | 34 | Senate Casual Vacancies | 73.32% | 6:0 | 81.62% | 76.13% | 58.86% | 76.59% | 57.11% | 53.78% | —N/a | —N/a |
| 1977 | 35 | Referendums | 77.72% | 6:0 | 83.92% | 80.78% | 59.58% | 83.29% | 72.62% | 62.25% | —N/a | —N/a |
| 1977 | 36 | Retirement of Judges | 80.10% | 6:0 | 84.84% | 81.43% | 65.24% | 85.57% | 78.37% | 72.46% | —N/a | —N/a |
| 1984 | 37 | Terms of Senators | 50.64% | 2:4 | 52.86% | 53.20% | 45.65% | 49.98% | 46.47% | 39.29% | 56.68% | 51.87% |
| 1984 | 38 | Interchange of Powers | 47.06% | 0:6 | 49.04% | 49.86% | 41.69% | 45.94% | 44.28% | 34.65% | 56.10% | 47.78% |
| 1988 | 39 | Parliamentary Terms | 32.92% | 0:6 | 31.66% | 36.20% | 35.15% | 26.76% | 30.67% | 25.34% | 43.62% | 38.13% |
| 1988 | 40 | Fair Elections | 37.60% | 0:6 | 35.57% | 40.12% | 44.83% | 30.61% | 32.02% | 28.89% | 51.99% | 42.99% |
| 1988 | 41 | Local Government | 33.62% | 0:6 | 31.70% | 36.06% | 38.31% | 29.85% | 29.76% | 27.50% | 39.78% | 38.80% |
| 1988 | 42 | Rights and Freedoms | 30.79% | 0:6 | 29.65% | 33.42% | 32.90% | 26.01% | 28.14% | 25.49% | 40.71% | 37.14% |
| 1999 | 43 | Establishment of Republic | 45.13% | 0:6 | 46.43% | 49.84% | 37.44% | 43.57% | 41.48% | 40.37% | 63.27% | 48.77% |
| 1999 | 44 | Preamble | 39.34% | 0:6 | 42.14% | 42.46% | 32.81% | 38.10% | 34.73% | 35.67% | 43.61% | 38.52% |
| 2023 | 45 | Aboriginal and Torres Strait Islander Voice | 39.94% | 0:6 | 41.04% | 45.85% | 31.79% | 35.83% | 36.73% | 41.06% | 61.29% | 39.70% |

=== Results of plebiscites ===
The four plebiscites were all non-binding polls and not referendums to change the constitution. Consequently, the majority of states requirement was not applicable.

| Year | No. | Name | States | Voters | Carried |
|---|---|---|---|---|---|
| 1916 | – | Military Service | 3:3 | 48.39% | No |
| 1917 | – | Military Service | 2:4 | 46.21% | No |
| 1977 | – | National Song | 5:1 | 43.29% | Yes (Note: The plebiscite was a choice between four songs. "Advance Australia Fair" received a plurality of votes, so the plebiscite carried despite the choice not receiving a majority.) |
| 2017 | – | Australian Marriage Law Postal Survey | 6:0 | 61.60% | Yes |

== State and territory referendums ==
States and territories of Australia may also hold referendums. Certain examples are listed below.

- In the years leading up to the Federation of Australia in 1901, all six colonies (as the states then were) passed referendums in favour of Federation.
- In 1933, voters in Western Australia voted for their state to leave the Commonwealth of Australia with the aim of reverting to the British Empire as an autonomous territory. The Western Australian Government sent a delegation to Westminster; however the United Kingdom House of Commons refused to intervene, declaring it had no power to grant secession, and therefore no action was taken to implement this decision.
- In 1967, voters in north-east New South Wales were asked if they favoured creating a new state in their region. The no vote won, with 54.1% of the formal vote.
- In 1968, Tasmanian voters took part in a referendum to approve the granting of Australia's first casino licence to the Federal Group to operate the Wrest Point Hotel Casino in Hobart. The referendum passed with 53% of the formal vote.
- In 1975, voters in Western Australia voted against permanent daylight saving/summer time.
- In 1978, the Australian Capital Territory voted at a referendum on whether the ACT should be granted self-government. Voters were given the choice of becoming a self-governing territory, a local government or continuing with the Legislative Assembly being an advisory body to the Department of the Capital Territory. 63.75% voted to continue with the then current arrangement. Despite the outcome of the referendum, the Parliament of Australia passed the Australian Capital Territory (Self-Government) Act in 1988 and the ACT became a self-governing territory in 1989.
- In 1981, the Tasmanian Government held a controversial referendum to decide the location of a hydro-electric dam on the Franklin River. With the electorate simply given a choice of two different dams, approximately 33% of the electorate voted informal by writing "No Dams" on their ballot paper.
- In 1984, voters in Western Australia voted against permanent daylight saving/summer time for a second time.
- In 1992, after trialling Daylight Saving in Queensland for a total of three years, a referendum was held, with 54.5% of Queenslanders voting against daylight saving. Regional and rural areas strongly opposed daylight saving, while those in the metropolitan south-east voted in favour of it.
- In 1992, a referendum to amend constitutional law in Queensland to extend the maximum parliamentary term from three to four years was defeated by 51.1% to 48.9%.
- Also in 1992, voters in Western Australia voted against permanent daylight saving/summer time for a third time.
- In 1992, voters in the Australian Capital Territory would vote to choose a proportional Hare-Clark electoral system over a single member system in the 1992 Australian Capital Territory electoral system referendum, held alongside the 1992 ACT election. Previously the Legislative Assembly was elected at large under a modified d’Hondt method.
- In 1995, voters in New South Wales voted for a fixed four-year term for the state parliament.
- In 2005, voters in Western Australia rejected two referendums related to weekday trading and Sunday trading.
- In 2009, after a three-year trial, voters in Western Australia voted against permanent daylight saving/summer time for a fourth time in four decades.
- In 2016, voters in Queensland voted 52.96% for a fixed four-year term for the state unicameral parliament.

As of 2024, the most recent state referendum in New South Wales was in 1995, in Queensland was in 2016, in South Australia was in 1991, in Tasmania was in 1981, in Western Australia was in 2009 and in Victoria in 1898.

== See also ==
- Proposed 2013 Australian constitutional referendum
