= 1948 Australian rents and prices referendum =

Unsuccessful Australian constitutional amendment vote

- 29 May 1948
- Do you approve of the proposed law for the alteration of the Constitution entitled — "Constitution Alteration (Rents and Prices) 1947" ?
- Outcome: Amendment Failed

Results
Choice	Votes	%
Yes	1,793,712	40.66%
No	2,618,183	59.34%
Valid votes	4,411,895	98.57%
Invalid or blank votes	64,106	1.43%
Total votes	4,476,001	100.00%
Registered voters/turnout	4,783,887	93.56%

The Constitution Alteration (Rents and Prices) Bill 1947, was an unsuccessful proposal to alter the Australian Constitution to give the Commonwealth power to make laws with respect to rents and prices. It was put to voters for approval in an Australian referendum held on 29 May 1948.

== Question ==
Do you approve of the proposed law for the alteration of the Constitution entitled 'Constitution Alteration (Rents and Prices) 1947'?

== Proposed Changes to the Constitution ==
The proposal was to insert into section 51 that the Parliament have power to make laws with respect to:

(xivA.) Rents and prices (including charges);

== Background ==
Control over prices was one of the 14 post-war powers that had been rejected in the 1944 referendum. (Note: Handbook of the 44th Parliament (2014) "Part 5 - Referendums and Plebiscites - Referendum results". Parliamentary Library of Australia.) The proposal was put forward and supported by the Chifley Labor government and was opposed by the Liberal–Country Coalition.

=== For ===
The Prime Minister Ben Chifley summed up his arguments for the proposal in the Sydney Morning Herald on 28 May 1948 as:

First, because rising prices threaten the value of wages or salaries, and of savings, and undermine the stability of the economy.

Secondly, because price control by six controlling authorities in the States will not work - the choice is Commonwealth control or no control.

Thirdly, because the Government can be relied on to administer price control sanely, to decentralise as much as possible, and to remove controls as supplies become adequate.

Fourthly, because a stable Australia will be a maximum help to Britain and to a world struggling back to economic health.

=== Against ===
The Leader of the Opposition, Robert Menzies summed up his arguments against the proposal as:

First is that the Federal Government's campaign of fear, with its predictions of chaos and of soaring rents and prices if the referendum is defeated, has been thoroughly and rightly discounted from one end of Australia to another.

Secondly, the State Governments, including, of course, the Governments in those States which still have Labour Administrations, have all acknowledged that the powers of the States are ample, and have declared their willingness to undertake control, if necessary, when the Commonwealth retires from the price and rent fixing field.

The third point, now generally recognised, is that this is in no sense a referendum on the desirability or otherwise of controls. ... This is a referendum simply to determine whether the controls involved should eventually revert to the States or whether they should be given to Canberra for ever. ... everyone in the Commonwealth is doubtless aware now that whatever the result of Saturday's vote, the present Federal controls will continue for some considerable period.

== Results ==
Result
State	Electoral roll	Ballots issued	For		Against		Informal
State	Electoral roll	Ballots issued	Vote	%	Vote	%	Informal
New South Wales	1,880,779	1,762,091	723,183	41.66	1,012,639	58.34	26,269
Victoria	1,351,853	1,270,037	559,361	44.63	693,937	55.37	16,739
Queensland	669,555	617,678	187,955	30.80	422,236	69.20	7,487
South Australia	422,809	402,778	167,171	42.15	229,438	57.85	6,169
Western Australia	301,223	278,282	105,605	38.59	168,088	61.41	4,589
Tasmania	157,668	145,135	50,437	35.45	91,845	64.55	2,853
Armed forces (Note: Armed forces totals are also included in their respective states.)		11,905	6,557		5,213		135
Total for Commonwealth	4,783,887	4,476,001	1,793,712	40.66	2,618,183	59.34	64,106
Results	Obtained majority in no state and an overall minority of 824,471 votes. Not carried						

== Discussion ==
This was the second of 11 referendums (as of October 2021) that failed to achieve a majority in any state. Power to control prices was sought for a third time in the 1973 referendum.

== See also ==
- Politics of Australia
- History of Australia
- Referendums in Australia
