= 1973 Australian referendum =

The 1973 Australian referendum was held on 8 December 1973. It contained two referendum questions.

Results (Note: Handbook of the 44th Parliament (2014) "Part 5 - Referendums and Plebiscites - Referendum results". Parliamentary Library of Australia.)
Question	NSW	Vic	Qld	SA	WA	Tas	States in favour	Voters in favour	Result
(27) Prices	No	No	No	No	No	No	0:6	44%	Not carried
(28) Incomes	No	No	No	No	No	No	0:6	34%	Not carried

== Results in detail ==
=== Prices ===
Result
State	Electoral roll	Ballots issued	For		Against		Informal
State	Electoral roll	Ballots issued	Vote	%	Vote	%	Informal
New South Wales	2,827,989	2,618,673	1,257,499	48.55	1,332,485	51.45	28,689
Victoria	2,129,494	2,001,924	891,144	45.18	1,081,120	54.82	29,660
Queensland	1,128,417	1,055,299	402,506	38.47	643,770	61.53	9,023
South Australia	737,573	700,333	282,754	41.16	404,181	58.84	13,398
Western Australia	588,789	542,122	169,605	31.90	362,121	68.10	10,396
Tasmania	241,207	229,016	85,631	38.22	138,416	61.78	4,969
Total for Commonwealth	7,653,469	7,147,367	3,089,139	43.81	3,962,093	56.19	96,135
Results	Obtained majority in no state and an overall minority of 872,954 votes. Not carried						

This section is an excerpt from 1973 Australian referendum (Prices) § Results

=== Incomes ===
Result
State	Electoral roll	Ballots issued	For		Against		Informal
State	Electoral roll	Ballots issued	Vote	%	Vote	%	Informal
New South Wales	2,827,989	2,618,673	1,041,429	40.31	1,542,217	59.69	35,027
Victoria	2,129,494	2,001,924	657,756	33.44	1,309,302	66.56	34,866
Queensland	1,128,417	1,055,299	331,163	31.70	713,562	68.30	10,574
South Australia	737,573	700,333	193,301	28.25	490,943	71.75	16,089
Western Australia	588,789	542,122	133,531	25.21	396,199	74.79	12,392
Tasmania	241,207	229,016	63,135	28.31	159,862	71.69	6,019
Total for Commonwealth	7,653,469	7,147,367	2,420,315	34.42	4,612,085	65.58	114,967
Results	Obtained majority in no state and an overall minority of 2,191,770 votes. Not carried						

This section is an excerpt from 1973 Australian referendum (Incomes) § Results

== See also ==
- Referendums in Australia
- Politics of Australia
- History of Australia
