= 1973 Australian incomes referendum =

Constitutional referendum

Australian Income Control referendum, 1973
| 8 December 1973 |
- Do you approve the proposed law for the alteration of the Constitution entitled "An Act to alter the Constitution so as to enable the Australian Parliament to make laws with respect to incomes"?
- Outcome: Amendment Failed

Results
| Choice | Votes | % |
|---|---|---|
| Yes | 2,420,315 | 34.42% |
| No | 4,612,085 | 65.58% |
| Valid votes | 7,032,400 | 98.39% |
| Invalid or blank votes | 114,967 | 1.61% |
| Total votes | 7,147,367 | 100.00% |
| Registered voters/turnout | 7,653,469 | 93.39% |
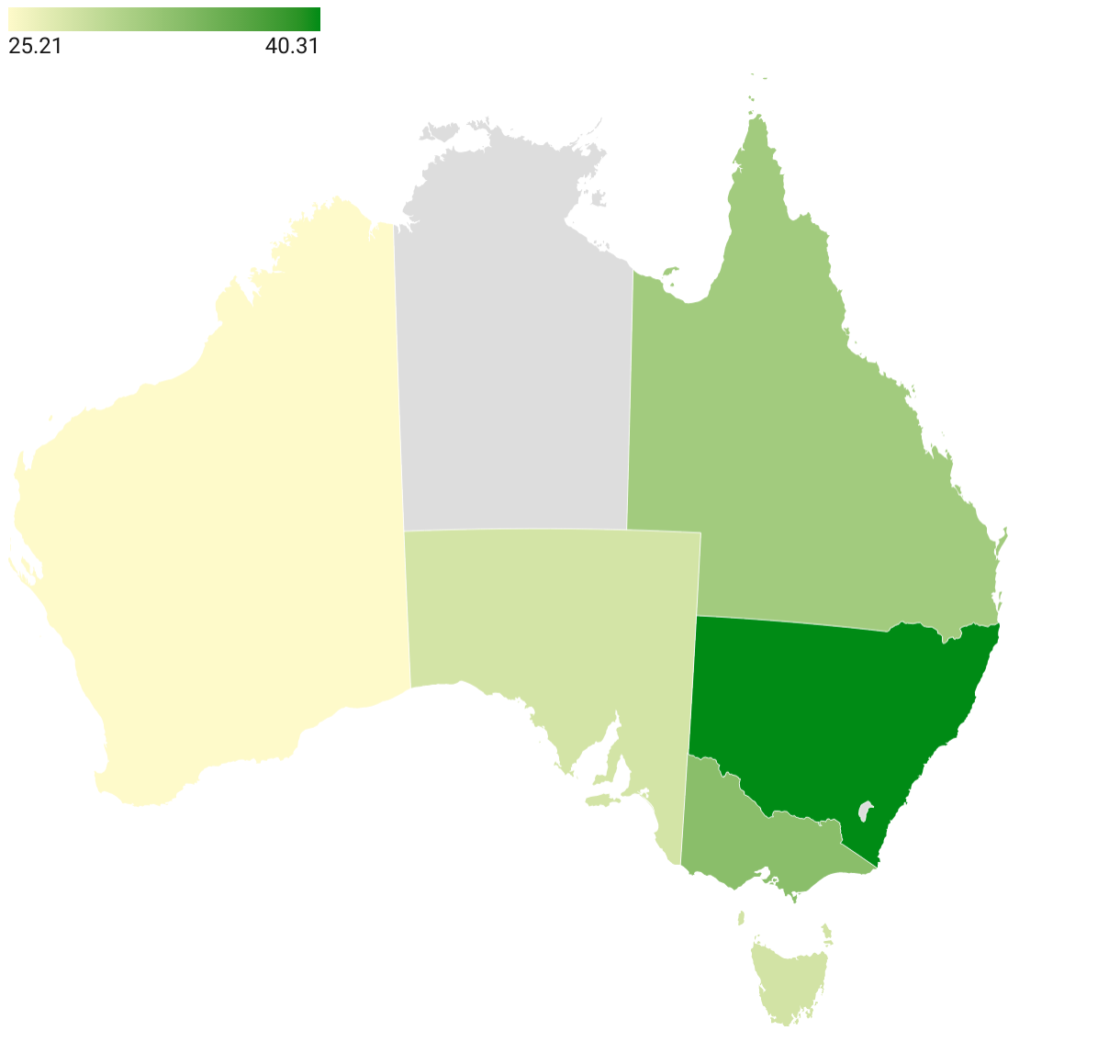
- Results by state
- Note: The darker the shade of green, the more "yes" votes

The Constitution Alteration (Incomes) 1973 was a referendum proposed by the Australian Labor Party in December 1973 which sought to alter section 51 of the Australian Constitution to give the Commonwealth legislative power over incomes. The Whitlam government's most prominent reason for posing this amendment was the issue of inflation, as they argued that with government power over incomes, inflation would be better managed.

The proposal did not pass due to a majority "no" vote from all states. This referendum was extremely unpopular and had the lowest percentage of public support when compared to any previous referendum held in Australia.

== Question ==
The question presented on the ballot paper:

Do you approve the proposed law for the alteration of the Constitution entitled "An Act to alter the Constitution so as to enable the Australian Parliament to make laws with respect to incomes"? (Note: Handbook of the 44th Parliament (2014) "Part 5 – Referendums and Plebiscites – Referendum results". Parliamentary Library of Australia.)

== Background ==
=== Economic context ===
Inflation escalated rapidly from the early 1970s to 1980s. The Consumer Price Index (CPI) in 1970 was 3.5% pa but quickly rose to 15.3% pa in 1975, indicating a significant increase in the rate of inflation. In addition, a supply shock hit the Australian economy with the Organization of the Petroleum Exporting Countries (OPEC) strikes and "Oil Shock", which not only led to an increase in oil prices but an international recession. The Australian economy became increasingly unstable within the global context. Significant pressure was placed on the Whitlam government to overcome these economic issues and restabilise the economy resulting in the 1973 Referendum (Incomes), Whitlam’s main attempt to control inflation.

=== Political context ===
The Whitlam government held power from 1972–1975, and was the first Labor government to be elected in 23 years. Whitlam’s government was prone to criticism over the number of policies his government tried to implement in a short period of time. Whitlam was also frequently criticised by some media, economists and the public for his management of the economy, especially in a time of economic crisis.

Many Australians supported Whitlam for his charisma and charm, believing he made positive impacts on Australia. Whilst others believed that he failed to effectively govern Australia, especially economically. ABC political journalist Annabel Crabb stated that it was Whitlam’s "irrepressible curiosity and quest for wisdom in his life" that was so appealing. However, some Australian commentators, such as Andrew Bolt, argue that this charisma was not enough, and that Whitlam governed "chaotically" as Prime Minister. Whitlam’s government remained controversial, especially in regard to its economic decisions and support for First Nations Australians. This overall controversy meant that there was no likely outcome for Whitlam’s 1973 Income referendum, especially considering the failed history of many Australian referendums.

== Public opinion and polls ==
At the beginning of the campaign before any major press or debates surrounding the income referendum, public opinion polls revealed that three states (NSW, VIC, and SA) would potentially vote ‘Yes’. However, as more press was garnered and Whitlam and Snedden began to make their cases for and against, public approval dwindled significantly, and polls suggested that no state was predicted to vote ‘Yes’.

The McNair Gallup opinion poll was published in the Melbourne Herald in October 1973. This poll was conducted before the referendum campaign had properly begun and therefore only showed early opinions. It contained the following data:

| | Yes | No | Undecided |
| Voting Intention | 49 | 37 | 3 |

The Bulletin opinion poll was conducted in mid-November 1973, published on 8 December 1973 and indicated the following spread of public opinion:

| | Yes | No | Undecided |
| Voting Intention | 47 | 37 | 16 |

The Age opinion poll was conducted on 6 December 1973 and revealed the following data:

| | Yes | No | Undecided |
| Voting Intention | 41.6 | 51.5 | 6.9 |

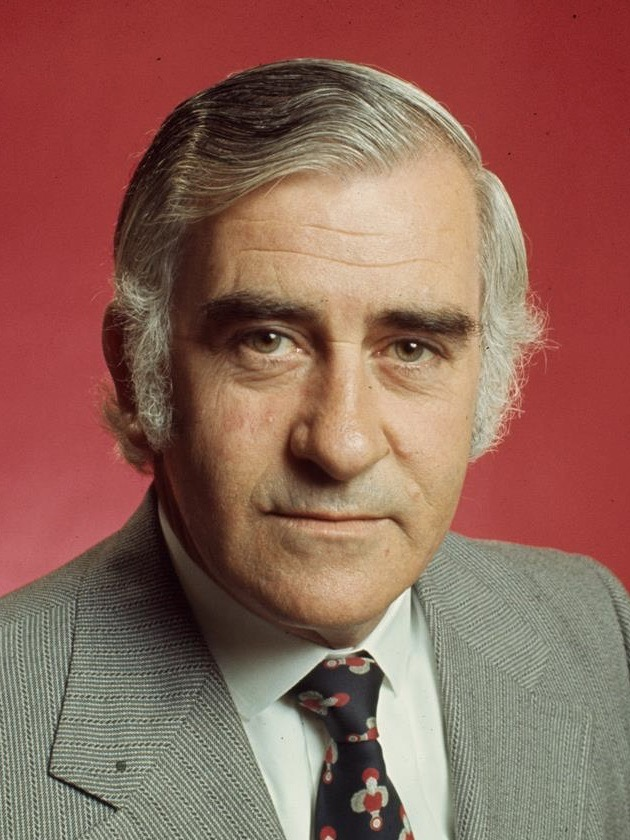
Billy Snedden, Leader of the Opposition.

This level of opposition to the referendum was a result of many factors. The referendum was posed at a time when Whitlam’s government was dealing with the Watergate scandal as well as anxieties surrounding the conflict in Vietnam. Much of the Australian public blamed Whitlam for these issues and were therefore less willing to place more power and trust in his government. Furthermore, polls suggested the public felt that the Whitlam government was not being clear enough about how the Labor government intended to use its power over income and believed their campaign to be unconvincing and vague. The general public confusion surrounding the referendum was emphasised by newspapers and journalists, such as Kenneth Davidson from The Australian, reporting that the parties themselves were confused about how income powers would be exercised.

The Sydney Morning Herald stated that incomes were a particularly personal and "hip pocket" issue for Australians, justifying the large degree of hesitation and apprehension around the proposed bill, revealed in numerous public opinion polls. The Sydney Morning Herald also argued that due to the personal nature of this referendum, The Liberal Party has been using this apprehension to foster a sense of fear, promoting a "When in doubt vote No" campaign. Public opinion polls revealed that the public had a general lack of understanding of the implications of the referendum and an overall ambivalent attitude towards the income referendum. The public's general lack of understanding, and their ambivalent attitude surrounding the incomes referendum was reflected throughout much of the campaign, revealed in many public opinion polls.

== Support and opposition ==
Whitlam’s Labor government proposed this bill and argued the ‘Yes’ case. Snedden’s Liberal party was the opposing party, arguing ‘No’.

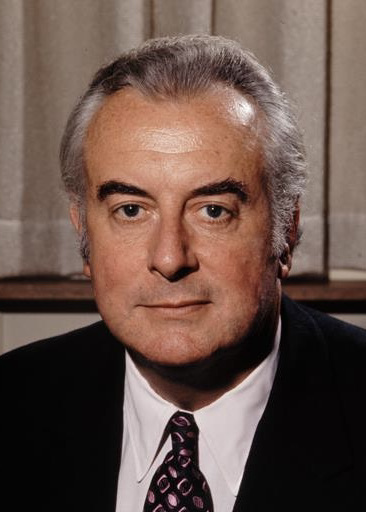
Gough Whitlam, Australian Prime Minister

=== Labor (support) ===
The main arguments from Whitlam’s Labor government in support of increasing income power were:

1. States were not able to effectively deal with inflation themselves, and therefore, an increase of federal power over incomes was needed.
2. Inflation could be dealt with through the introduction of quarterly wage adjustments and without the need for wage freezes or increased unemployment.
3. This power would advance equal pay for women and would create a more equitable income and wage system.
4. It would not be enough to just have powers over prices. Power over incomes was crucial in stabilising the economy.

=== Liberal (opposition) ===
The main arguments in opposition to the increase of income power from Snedden’s Liberal party were:

1. The increase in federal powers would be a direct threat to federalism and defeat the purpose of the separation and division of powers to the states.
2. The proposal would be unnecessary as states were capable of managing income control.
3. That the Labor government were trying to abuse the declining economy to secure more power.
4. That it was unclear how the federal government intended on using this power once obtained.
5. Concerns about the permanency of the power and how that could be used and potentially abused by governments that succeeded Whitlam.
6. There would be a better way of dealing with inflation by holding a conference with federal and state governments and a variety of unions and other industry organisations. Here, they would create an effective plan to deal with the declining economy.

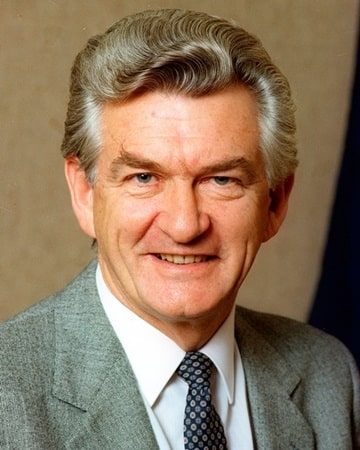
Bob Hawke, then-leader of the ACTU.

=== Other opposition ===
The Australian Council of Trade Unions (ACTU), and other trade unions, almost unanimously advocated for a ‘No’ vote to federal powers over incomes. The leader of the ACTU, Bob Hawke, had significant influence in leading the trade union campaigns against the income referendum. Their main concerns focused on what those powers could be used for in the future by non-labor governments and they did not believe wages should be controlled by the federal government. The unions did not believe that the proposed powers would be effective in controlling inflation.

Other minor political parties including the Country Party, led by Doug Anthony, also voted and supported the ‘No’ campaign as they believed that by controlling incomes and capping wages it would be more difficult to maintain productive workplaces.

=== Other support ===
Whilst the support for the passing of the income referendum did fall in the minority, some economists and academics in support of increasing income controls, such as Stephen J. Turnovsky and Michael Parkin, believed that the government had little choice to do anything else. Their views were that if the government did not increase their controls over income, they would have to allow for unemployment to grow and the economy to stagnate. However, they believed that if they didn’t gain control over incomes, inflation would be likely to continue escalating.

Economists from The Australian Economic Review acknowledged that inflation in Australia in 1973 was a result of a ‘wage-price spiral’. They argued that the increasing price levels in Australia resulted in the Australian public demanding higher wages, thus, resulting in a "wage-price spiral". Many economists, including those at The Australian Economic Review, argued that if the Whitlam government did not step in and take control over incomes and manage this ‘wage-price spiral’, inflation would continue to escalate, and the public would be negatively impacted.

== Results ==
The 1973 Referendum (Incomes) failed to achieve a ‘Yes’ majority from any state. 34.42% of voters voted ‘Yes’ to the incomes question with a minority of 2 191 770 votes.

Result
| State | Electoral roll | Ballots issued | For | | Against | | Informal |
| State | Electoral roll | Ballots issued | Vote | % | Vote | % | Informal |
|---|---|---|---|---|---|---|---|
| New South Wales | 2,827,989 | 2,618,673 | 1,041,429 | 40.31 | 1,542,217 | 59.69 | 35,027 |
| Victoria | 2,129,494 | 2,001,924 | 657,756 | 33.44 | 1,309,302 | 66.56 | 34,866 |
| Queensland | 1,128,417 | 1,055,299 | 331,163 | 31.70 | 713,562 | 68.30 | 10,574 |
| South Australia | 737,573 | 700,333 | 193,301 | 28.25 | 490,943 | 71.75 | 16,089 |
| Western Australia | 588,789 | 542,122 | 133,531 | 25.21 | 396,199 | 74.79 | 12,392 |
| Tasmania | 241,207 | 229,016 | 63,135 | 28.31 | 159,862 | 71.69 | 6,019 |
| Total for Commonwealth | 7,653,469 | 7,147,367 | 2,420,315 | 34.42 | 4,612,085 | 65.58 | 114,967 |
| Results | Obtained majority in no state and an overall minority of 2,191,770 votes. Not carried | | | | | | |

== Aftermath ==
=== Legacy ===
Owing to the failure of this referendum and the majority opposition towards increased controls over income, the Labor government were unable gain control over incomes. Whitlam’s main impact on issues surrounding income was the implementation of universal healthcare and policies to improve social housing. Both of these reforms aimed to give more equal opportunities to those with lower incomes, however, they could not manage inflation. Academic Joan Rydon, writing in 1974, asserted that "Already the referendum seems to have faded into the past.", indicating the insignificant legacy of this referendum.

=== Reasons for rejection ===
The rejection of the income referendum was believed to be due to a multitude of reasons. Alec Robertson, a political journalist for Tribune, the newspaper for the Communist Party of Australia, stated that this rejection of the referendum would significantly impact Australians on lower wages. This was due to the disproportionate impact that inflation, and particularly "stagflation", had on those with lower socio-economic statuses as unemployment increased along with the increase of prices. Furthermore, Robertson argued that a major reason that this referendum did not pass was due to the Labor government’s insistence on posing two referendum questions at once. One question on government control over prices and one on incomes. Robertson asserted that "workers were torn between loyalty to the Labor Government and loyalty to the trade union movement." He believed that if one question had been asked, this would have allowed the government to gain some economic controls to manage inflation as there would have been less confusion and the public would have been less divided.

For the Whitlam government, the failure of this referendum was a clear sign that no other referendum proposed by his government, succeeding the 1973 referendum, would have any hope of passing. This referendum ultimately served to affirm the notion that the Australian constitution is notoriously difficult to amend, and continued the history of failed referendums. Of the twenty seven referendums posed since Federation in 1901, the incomes referendum was the twenty second failed referendum. It also became the most unpopular referendum in Australian history, with the lowest amount of support from voters.

=== Economic trajectory ===
Inflation continued to escalate rapidly, exacerbated by a ‘wages explosion’ in 1974. Inflation levels peaked at 19 percent in 1974 and continued to remain at a high level for the next two decades. Economists, such as Richard Holden, in hindsight, view Whitlam’s increase in government spending after the failed referendum to be a large failing by the Labor government. Holden believed that Whitlam only served to worsen the inflation crisis and ‘wage price spiral’ at the time with his economic management. The rejection of Whitlam's 1973 income referendum gave way to later policies that attempted to manage the Australian economy such as the 1975 Wage Indexation Policy. This policy was in response to rapidly increasing wages and attempted to restrict any further growth. However, Bruce Hockman, former Chief Economist at the Australian Bureau of Statistics, argues that this indexation policy only ended up "locking in inflation in the long run". The Australian economy fell into a greater recession from 1982–83.

== See also ==
- Another question was put to the people on the same day, see 1973 Australian referendum (Prices).
- Referendums in Australia
- Politics of Australia
- History of Australia
