= 1951 Australian Communist Party ban referendum =

Australian communist ban referendum

- 22 September 1951
- Do you approve of the proposed law for the alteration of the Constitution entitled— "Constitution Alteration (Powers to deal with Communists and Communism) 1951" ?
- Outcome: Amendment Failed

Results
Choice	Votes	%
Yes	2,317,927	49.44%
No	2,370,009	50.56%
Valid votes	4,687,936	98.60%
Invalid or blank votes	66,653	1.40%
Total votes	4,754,589	100.00%
Registered voters/turnout	4,974,337	95.58%
- Results by state, and division
- Note: Saturation of colour denotes strength of vote

On 22 September 1951, a referendum was held in Australia which sought approval to alter the Australian Constitution to give Parliament the power to make laws regarding communism and communists, so that the Parliament would be empowered to instate a law similar to the Communist Party Dissolution Act of 1950. It was not carried.

== General background ==
After World War II, membership of the Communist Party of Australia had peaked at around 20,000 and Fred Paterson had won the seat of Bowen in the 1944 Queensland state election. Communists became prominent in trade unions as well as cultural and literary circles. Following the attempted nationalisation of the Australian Banks in 1948, Opposition Leader Robert Menzies became concerned that communist ideas were infiltrating the Labor Party. A Queensland rail strike in that same year cemented that idea. Menzies vowed that if elected he would outlaw communism.

=== 1949 federal election campaign ===
In the 1949 general election, the newly formed Liberal Party campaigned on a strongly anti-communist, anti-interventionist platform, which targeted the Labor government's attempt to nationalise banking in Australia, as well as what Menzies considered to be a growing communist threat in the wake of World War II.

On 27 June 1949, coal miners went out on strike, supported by the Communist Party and various unions. Bargaining quickly broke down between the unions and government and on 1 August, Prime Minister Chifley sent in troops from the Australian Armed Forces to run the mines until the dispute was resolved. By its fourth day, the Sydney docks were congested with coal ships unable to leave the port, the loading of ships being severely delayed by restricted transport. By 1 July the government was examining the possibility of importing coal from Britain. The strike lasted over 6 weeks, until 15 August. Later that year, PM Chifley also brought in legislation to begin the rationing of petrol. Both of these events became key issues in the 1949 federal election campaign.

During the campaign, Menzies asserted that socialism was the "outstanding issue" of the day. He accused the Labor Party of having communist leanings, citing as proof its banking legislation and regulation in other areas of the economy. "A vote for Labor," he suggested, "is a vote for the socialist objective". Socialism was, according to Menzies, detrimental to the freedom and prosperity of the nation, and to be considered a real and prominent threat to the Australian way of life.

In December 1949, the Liberal Party with Robert Menzies as Prime Minister won a majority in the House of Representatives with 74 of 121 seats.

=== The Communist Party Dissolution Act ===
On 23 June 1950, the Communist Party Dissolution Bill 1950 (Cth) was introduced. In his speech introducing the Bill, PM Menzies read out the names of 53 members of the Communist Party of Australia, referring to them as a "traitorous minority" which threatened the security of the nation. The Bill passed the House of Representatives, but struggled to pass the Senate, which had a Labor party majority. Labor senators agreed that the Communist Party should be dissolved, but held reservations about allowing the Governor-General in Council (the executive government) to 'declare' people communists. These reservations were especially strong after Menzies admitted that the names of Communist Party members which had been read out on the House floor contained errors. Amendments were proposed that removed this power, but the Labor Party later withdrew its opposition and the Bill passed the Senate without amendments on 19 October 1950. It was brought into effect as the Communist Party Dissolution Act 1950 (Cth) on 20 October 1950.

The Act authorised the Governor-General to declare any person a communist, where the executive government was satisfied that person is "engaged, or is likely to engage, in activities prejudicial to the security and defence of the Commonwealth or to the execution or maintenance of the Constitution or of the laws of the Commonwealth". Such persons were not allowed to be employed by the Commonwealth in public service, or in industries considered vital to the defence of Australia. They were not permitted to run for office and were prohibited from joining a union. The Communist Party of Australia was declared an unlawful organisation and was dissolved, its property forfeited to the Commonwealth without compensation. Affiliated organisations were also liable to be declared unlawful, at the government’s discretion.

=== Australian Communist Party v Commonwealth (1951) ===
Immediately following the passage of the Act, a challenge was filed in the High Court. The case was heard beginning on 14 November 1950 by all seven judges of the High Court. The question was whether the federal government had the power to pass this law under the Section 51(vi) of the Constitution of Australia (also known as the defence power). Section 51(vi) of the Constitution gives the Parliament power to make laws in regard to "the naval and military defence of the Commonwealth and of the several States, and the control of the forces to execute and maintain the laws of the Commonwealth". The Commonwealth claimed that the Act was valid under this power because communists presented a real threat to Australian security, as revolution was a central theme of marxism.

On 19 March 1951, the Court ruled 6:1 (Latham CJ dissenting) that the Act was invalid. In his opinion, Fullagar J summarised the position of the majority writing,

The validity of a law or of an administrative act done under a law cannot be made to depend on the opinion of the law-maker, or the person who is to do the act, that the law or the consequence of the act is within the constitutional power upon which the law in question itself depends for its validity. A power to make laws with respect to lighthouses does not authorize the making of a law with respect to anything which is, in the opinion of the law-maker, a lighthouse. A power to make a proclamation carrying legal consequences with respect to a lighthouse is one thing: a power to make a similar proclamation with respect to anything which in the opinion of the Governor-General is a lighthouse is another thing.

== Question ==
Do you approve of the proposed law for the alteration of the Constitution entitled Constitution Alteration (Powers to deal with Communists and Communism) 1951?

== Referendum ==
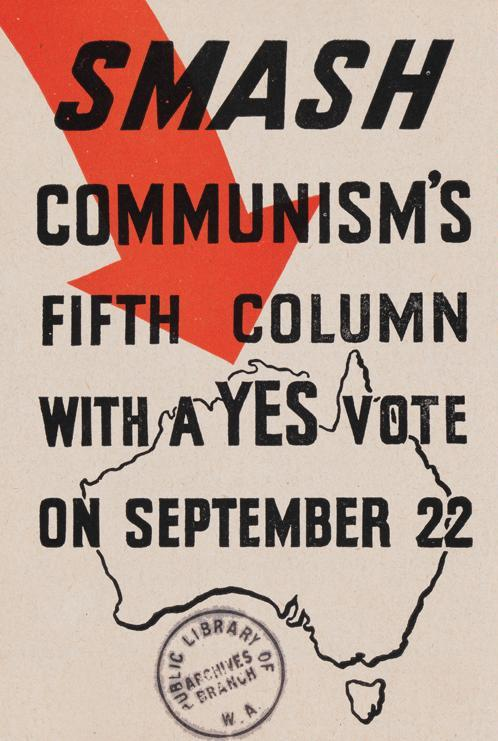
Australian Prime Minister Menzies proposed a federal referendum on 22 September 1951 asking voters to give the Commonwealth Government the power to make laws regarding communists and communism.

A referendum was called on 23 August 1951, which sought to insert a clause into the constitution that empowered the Federal Parliament make laws in reference to communism and communists. Newspaper editorials were overwhelmingly in favour of the ban with 12 editorials in support, two papers not taking a stance (Daily Mirror and Daily News), and just one newspaper against it (The Argus). The Labor party had decided to campaign for a No vote despite supporting the Bill through the senate the previous year. Opposition Leader HV Evatt held more speeches than Menzies and started campaigning earlier, campaigning vigorously against what he perceived as Menzies' attempt to establish a police state in Australia. Menzies' speeches were often interrupted by the No campaign's hecklers, although Menzies claimed to have been happy with the uproar because it demonstrated the communists' "disrespect for Liberal norms".

Some Liberal Party members and non-affiliated conservatives also supported the No campaign, which undermined Menzies efforts to convince the public that this was a necessary measure. Despite this, seven weeks before the ballot, the ban was supported by 73.3% percent of respondents in a Gallup Poll. The reason behind the Gallup support plummeting for Yes has been estimated to have been especially middle class Liberal voters slipping away from the Coalition position, whereas Labor kept their ranks better. Bi-partisan support was usually required for constitutional amendments to pass in Australia.

The referendum was held on 22 September 1951. The question which appeared on the ballot was:

Do you approve of the proposed law for the alteration of the Constitution entitled 'Constitution Alteration (Powers to deal with Communists and Communism) 1951'?

The referendum was not carried. Reflecting on the outcome, Menzies remarked "to get an affirmative vote from the Australian people on a referendum proposal is one of the labours of Hercules".

== Proposed Changes to the Constitution ==
The 'Constitutional Alteration (Power to deal with Communists and Communism) 1951' proposed to insert into the constitution after section 51 the following text.

51A.--(1.) The Parliament shall have power to make such laws for the peace, order and good government of the Commonwealth with respect to communists or communism as the Parliament considers to be necessary or expedient for the defence or security of the Commonwealth or for the execution or maintenance of this Constitution or of the laws of the Commonwealth.

(2.) In addition to all other powers conferred on the Parliament by this Constitution and without limiting any such power, the Parliament shall have power---

(a) to make a law in the terms of the Communist Party Dissolution Act 1950--

(i) without alteration; or

(ii) with alterations, being alterations with respect to a matter dealt with by that Act or with respect to some other matter with respect to which the Parliament has power to make laws;

(b) to make laws amending the law made under the last preceding paragraph, but so that any such amendment is with respect to a matter dealt with by that law or with respect to some other matter with respect to which the Parliament has power to make laws; and

(c) to repeal a law made under either of the last two preceding paragraphs.

(3.) In this section, 'the Communist Party Dissolution Act 1950' means the proposed law passed by the Senate and the House of Representatives, and assented to by the Governor-General on the twentieth day of October, One thousand nine hundred and fifty, being the proposed law entitled 'An Act to provide for the Dissolution of the Australian Communist Party and of other Communist Organizations, to disqualify Communists from holding certain Offices, and for purposes connected therewith'.

== Results ==
Result (Note: Handbook of the 44th Parliament (2014) "Part 5 - Referendums and Plebiscites - Referendum results". Parliamentary Library of Australia.)
State	Electoral roll	Ballots issued	For		Against		Informal
State	Electoral roll	Ballots issued	Vote	%	Vote	%	Informal
New South Wales	1,944,219	1,861,147	865,838	47.17	969,868	52.83	25,441
Victoria	1,393,556	1,326,024	636,819	48.71	670,513	51.29	18,692
Queensland	709,328	675,916	373,156	55.76	296,019	44.24	6,741
South Australia	442,983	427,253	198,971	47.29	221,763	52.71	6,519
Western Australia	319,383	305,653	164,989	55.09	134,497	44.91	6,167
Tasmania	164,868	158,596	78,154	50.26	77,349	49.74	3,093
Armed Forces (Note: Armed forces totals are also included in their respective states.)		9,472	6,478		2,917		82
Total for Commonwealth	4,974,337	4,754,589	2,317,927	49.44	2,370,009	50.56	66,653
Results	Obtained majority in three states and an overall minority of 52 082 votes. Not carried						

== See also ==
- List of banned political parties
- Anti-communism
- Politics in Australia
- History of Australia
- Referendums in Australia
