= Turnovský =

Turnovský is a Czech surname, meaning "Turnov's". Notable people with the surname include:

- Frederick Turnovsky (1916–1994), New Zealand manufacturer, entrepreneur, advocate and community leader
- Jan Trojan Turnovský (before 1550 – 1606), Czech composer
- Jaromír Turnovský (1912–?), Czech speed skater
- Josef Turnovský (born 1922), Czech table tennis player
- Martin Turnovský (1928–2021), Czech conductor
- Stephen J. Turnovsky (born 1941), New Zealand economist
