= 2009 Western Australian daylight saving referendum =

Western Australian Daylight Saving referendum, 2009
- 16 May 2009
- Are you in favour of daylight saving being introduced in Western Australia by standard time in the State being advanced one hour from the last Sunday in October 2009 until the last Sunday in March 2010 and in similar fashion for each following year?

Results
Choice	Votes	%
Yes	519,899	45.44%
No	624,304	54.56%
Valid votes	1,144,203	99.60%
Invalid or blank votes	4,650	0.40%
Total votes	1,148,853	100.00%
Registered voters/turnout	1,341,554	85.64%

The 2009 Western Australian daylight saving referendum was held on 16 May 2009 in the Australian state of Western Australia to decide if daylight saving time should be adopted. It was the fourth such proposal which had been put to Western Australian voters and followed a three-year trial period. The referendum resulted in the proposal being rejected, with 54.56% voting against the proposal.

As of 2026, this is the most recent Western Australian state referendum.

== Background ==
Various states and territories in Australia adopted daylight saving time between 1968 and 1971, but Queensland, the Northern Territory and Western Australia did not do so. In Western Australia, three referendums were held in 1975, 1984 and 1992 on the issue, with daylight saving being rejected each time.

On 25 October 2006, two members of the Western Australian Legislative Assembly, former Labor minister turned independent member John D'Orazio and Liberal leader Matt Birney, introduced a private members' bill for a three-year trial of daylight saving to begin in December 2006. The Labor government of Western Australia backed the trial and both main parties agreed to hold a free vote on the issue. Farming groups quickly came out against the move, along with the mining lobby, but the move was backed by business groups. The bill was approved by the lower house 37–14 and then by the upper house 21–10, enabling the trial to start from 3 December.

During 2007 there was growing opposition to daylight saving time with some in the National Party calling for people to ignore the trial. In October 2007 the Liberal Party proposed a bill to bring the referendum forward to early 2008 because of the backlash against daylight saving, and a petition was signed by 66,000 people supporting holding the referendum in 2008. However this was not successful and the referendum was called for 16 May 2009.

== Question ==
The question voted on in the referendum was:

Are you in favour of daylight saving being introduced in Western Australia by standard time in the State being advanced one hour from the last Sunday in October 2009 until the last Sunday in March 2010 and in similar fashion for each following year?

== Campaign ==
Business groups were among the main supporters of daylight saving time and financed the 'yes' campaign. The 'yes' campaign argued that it would make dealing with businesses from the east of Australia easier during the summer as it would reduce the time difference. They also put the case that with daylight saving time, families would be able to spend more time together outdoors after work while it was still light.

Opposition was strongest in rural areas of Western Australia with farmers arguing that it caused problems for them. Opponents argued that daylight saving led to more deaths on the roads and that it was inconvenient for families. With daylight saving they also said that electricity consumption was increased, damaging the environment.

Campaigning was intense during the week before the poll. On 11 May, the WA Farmers Federation claimed the Electoral Commission was biased as, while voters were instructed to write the words "Yes" or "No" in the box, a tick would be accepted as a yes, while a cross would be marked as an invalid vote. On 13 May, Kalgoorlie independent MP John Bowler, who was a daylight saving supporter, pledged that if the referendum was passed, he would move a private member's bill to exclude March from the period. However, supporters labelled this a stunt, as there was no guarantee the bill would pass Parliament.

Opinion polls gave no clear indication as to the eventual result. While The West Australian tipped a 53% 'no' vote, The Sunday Times, which conducted an online poll via its PerthNow portal, tipped a 53% 'yes' vote. The Premier of Western Australia Colin Barnett did not declare which way he would vote until the day of the referendum, when he said that he had voted yes, but that a no vote was the most likely outcome of the referendum.

== Results ==
The referendum proposition was rejected, with 54.56% voting no, as against 45.44% who voted yes.

It was compulsory to vote at the referendum, and 1,148,853 voters, representing 85.64% of enrolled voters, turned out to cast a vote. Non-voters faced a fine of $20 to $50.

The 'no' vote was strongest in regional and rural areas as well as the outer suburbs of Perth. The 'no' vote had a majority in 35 of the state's 59 electorates, including all of the non-metropolitan electorates ranging from 85.36% in Wagin to 55.91% in Birney's former electorate of Kalgoorlie, but also including 18 of metropolitan Perth's 42 electorates. The 'yes' vote achieved a majority in 24 electorates, all but two of which were in the North Metropolitan and South Metropolitan regions. The electorates of Ocean Reef (63.01%), Perth (59.96%), Joondalup (59.20%), Hillarys (58.33%) and Kingsley (56.66%) recorded the highest 'yes' votes.

Following the fourth rejection of daylight saving time in a referendum the issue was described as being dead for a generation, with Premier Colin Barnett saying that "it should not be considered for another 20 years."

Electorate	Turnout	For	Against
1,341,554	1,148,853 (85.64%)	519,899 (45.44%)	624,304 (54.56%)
Source: Western Australian Electoral Commission
