= John Brudenall =

Michael John Brudenall (31 October 1938 – 27 January 2016) was an Australian librarian and library educator. He contributed to the development of library technician education and employment in Australia. He planned the Commonwealth Parliamentary Library for the new Parliament House building in Canberra and advocated for stronger collaboration between the parliamentary libraries in the Asia Pacific region.

== Early life ==
Michael John Brudenall was born on 31 October 1938. He attended Melbourne High School and he moved from Melbourne to Canberra in 1960 to join the staff of the newly created National Library of Australia.He was one of 16 graduates selected Australia wide to train as professional librarians at the National Library. His wife, Sue Morcombe also joined as part of this group. They subsequently had 4 children.

== Career ==
John worked at the National Library of Australia from 1960 to 1966. In 1966, the Commonwealth Parliamentary Library separated from the National Library of Australia and John joined the Parliamentary Library staff where he worked in a variety of roles including preparation librarian, chief reference librarian, senior executive officer, assistant parliamentary librarian. In April 1983 he was appointed to the role of deputy parliamentary librarian where he was responsible for planning the library at the new Parliament House in Canberra and relocation into the new building, which opened in 1988. His work at the Commonwealth Parliamentary Library included overseeing the digitisation of its catalogue.

=== Contribution to librarianship ===
John participated in international parliamentary library organisations such as the Association of Parliamentary Libraries of Australasia and the Association of Parliamentary Libraries of Asia and the Pacific. He advocated for the development of links between parliamentary libraries. When civilian government was restored in Cambodia in 1993, he spent time there advising the new government on the establishment of a parliamentary library.

John was closely associated with the Library Association of Australia, serving on a number of committees was elected president of the Library Association of Australia from 1979-1980 and was a member of the executive committee from 1978 to 1980. He was a member of the National Library of Australia's Working Party on Library Services for the Handicapped in 1977 to 1979, which developed comprehensive policy recommendations for library services to the disabled in Australia. He joined the AACOBS Working Party on User Needs in 1983 and was chairman of the AACOBS ACT Committee from 1984. In 2014, he was interviewed about his professional career

=== Library technicians ===
John Brudenall was a major figure in the development of library technician education and employment in Australia. John spent time as a part-time tutor and lecturer in Librarianship at Canberra CAE. He encouraged the establishment of the Library Technicians Section of the Association in 1979, arguing that the Association had a strong role to play in support of technicians. He was a key figure in the development of the curriculum for the Library Technicians Course at Canberra College of TAFE.

== Bibliography ==
- Brudenall, John (1978), Librarians in the service of Parliament : the recent experience of the Australian Parliamentary Library, Kuring-gai College of Advanced Education, ISBN 978-0-909177-08-9
- "Bringing the electronic library to parliament: opportunities and challenges." IFLA. General conference. 1996.
- Brudenall, John (September 2001). "A man for his time : Allan Percy Fleming, CBE OBE". National Library of Australia News. XI (12): 10–13. Archived from the original on 19 January 2012.

== Awards ==
- 1986 Fellow of the Australian Library and Information Association

== See also ==
- Parliamentary Library of Australia
