= Sneddon =

Sneddon is a surname. Notable people with the surname include:

- Alan Sneddon (born 1958), Scottish footballer (Celtic FC, Hibernian FC)
- Arthur Sneddon, former New Zealand wrestler
- Bob Sneddon (1921–2012), American football running back
- David Sneddon (born 1978), Scottish singer, songwriter, musician and music producer
- Ian Sneddon (1919–2000), Scottish mathematician
- Ian Sneddon (footballer) (born 1946), Scottish footballer (Heart of Midlothian FC)
- James Sneddon, Australian linguist
- Jamie Sneddon (born 1997), Scottish football goalkeeper (Partick Thistle FC)
- Kevin Sneddon (born 1970), American ice hockey coach
- Megan Sneddon (born 1985), Scottish female footballer (Motherwell LFC)
- Paul Sneddon (1955/1956–2026), known as Vladimir McTavish, Scottish comedian
- Thomas W. Sneddon Jr. (1941–2014), former district attorney of Santa Barbara County, California

== See also ==
- Snedden (disambiguation)
- Sneddon's syndrome
