= 1973 Australian price control referendum =

Australian Price Control referendum, 1973
- 8 December 1973
- "Do you approve the proposed law for the alteration of the Constitution entitled "An Act to alter the Constitution so as to enable the Australian Parliament to control prices"?

Results
Choice	Votes	%
Yes	3,089,139	43.81%
No	3,962,093	56.19%
Valid votes	7,051,232	98.65%
Invalid or blank votes	96,135	1.35%
Total votes	7,147,367	100.00%
Registered voters/turnout	7,653,469	93.39%
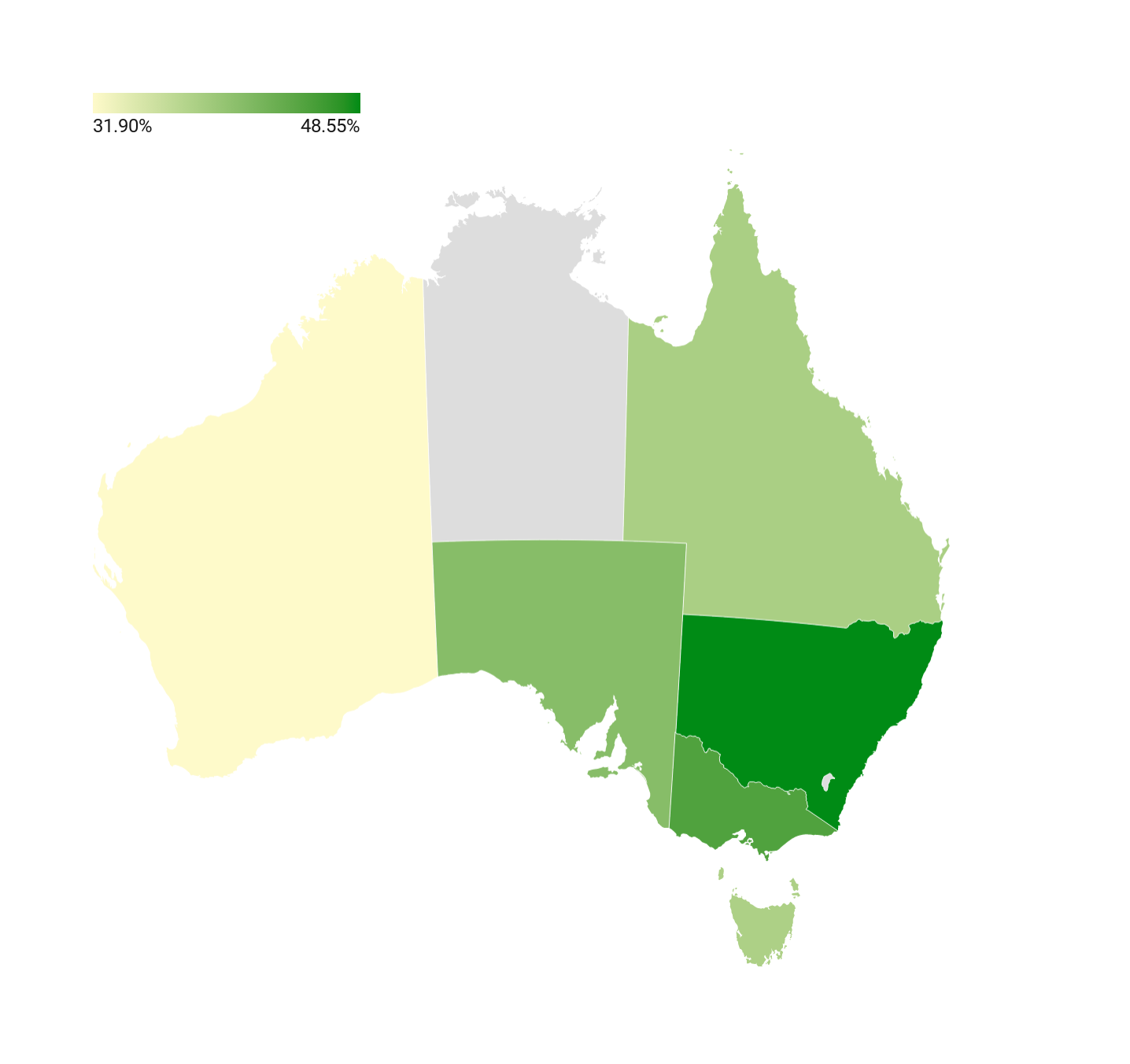
- Results by state
- Note: Darkness of colour denotes strength of vote

The Constitution Alteration (Prices) 1973 was a bill proposing amendments to section 51 of the Australian Constitution which would give the Commonwealth legislative power over prices. The proposed changes to the constitution were not upheld, with Australians voting against the constitutional alteration.

The Whitlam government proposed the amendments to the constitution reasoning that by granting increased power to federal government over prices they would be able to control inflation, which at the time was increasing significantly. However, it was ultimately determined by the voters that this was an unnecessary intervention by government, with concerns raised about the future possibility of the abuse of such powers.

== Background ==
=== Economic context ===
The economic context that led to the eventual proposition of the 1973 Prices Referendum was driven by numerous economic factors. A resource boom derived from the demands of Japanese industrialisation and increased capital inflows due to the Australian dollar being perceived as undervalued drove Australia's economy in the early 1970s. These factors contributed to an economic environment in 1971 that was generally considered strong, with the AUD rising to $1.40, unemployment at 2% and economic growth rising 5% per year.

However, in the same period, inflation rose steadily to 7.3% as average weekly earnings rose to over 10% per annum. Australia's inflation post World War II averaged around 2%. Therefore, this increase in inflation was very significant at the time. Fiscal policy was expansionary with concerns over the slow rise of unemployment. The Whitlam Labor government announced tax cuts, along with spending on education, health, urban development and the environment. Additionally, Whitlam's government supported pay rises, improvements in working conditions and gender equality in income. This led to an increase in minimum wage for women from 75% to 100% of the corresponding male wage.

In 1973, average weekly earnings had increased to 15.3% driven by wage decisions and consequently the inflation rate began to push double figures. In October 1973, the Arab-Israel conflict quadrupled world oil prices, triggering global high unemployment and high inflation or "stagflation". Australia's own inflation rate rose to 10.1% in 1973.

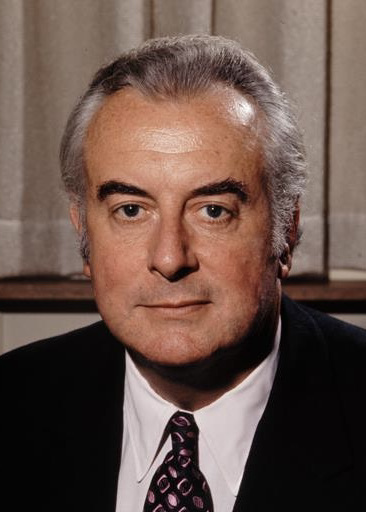
Prime Minister Gough Whitlam, pictured in 1972.

=== Political context ===
By 1973, Gough Whitlam's government was under growing pressure to slow the rising inflation. Snedden's Liberal party opposition accused Whitlam of allowing inflation to get out of control, while instead spending extensively on social issues like education and health. They also criticised Labor as hypocritical, because as the opposition Labor scrutinised the Liberal government for not acting on inflation which at the time was in a more stable state.

Whitlam argued the Labor Party had inherited 'stagflation' from the previous government who had instigated wage rises and created circumstances for an overvalued dollar. Whitlam offered several policies to address the issue, such as famously cutting tariffs by 25% across the board. In August 1973, Whitlam introduced legislation that established the Prices Justification Tribunal, which ultimately scrutinised price changes by large corporations. Although this provided the federal government with some general powers on pricing, the Prices Justification Tribunal was not given the power to act on decisions found from their enquiries. Opponents of the tribunal criticised its ineffectiveness, arguing that the tribunal had no real power in effecting market prices and thus curbing inflation. The ineffective nature of the tribunal was under fire with Snedden ironically calling it the Prices "Exemption" Tribunal. However, supporters of the tribunal argued that it was effective in holding back price rises. The first Prices Justification Tribunal Annual Report identified the difference between prices originally proposed to the tribunal and the prices found to be justified by the tribunal was $253 million. Additionally, the existence of the tribunal made companies more cautious about price rises, although the effect of this is unquantifiable. In a ploy to boost the effectiveness of the tribunal and silence critics, Whitlam on 22 September proposed the Prices Referendum that sought to give power to Australian Parliament to control prices as one element in an anti-inflationary strategy.

== Question ==
The question appeared on the ballot paper as:

Do you approve the proposed law for the alteration of the Constitution entitled "An Act to alter the Constitution so as to enable the Australian Parliament to control prices"?

== Public opinion polls ==
Numerous polls were published before the referendum by reputable polling organisations. Overwhelmingly, these public opinion polls predicted that voting intentions were to affirm the referendum.

A poll published in The Age on 6 December predicted:

	Yes	No	Undecided
Opinion poll	54.6%	39.8%	5.6%

Another poll was taken by the McNair Gallup Poll on 23 October, which was published in The Herald. This poll was taken early in the referendum campaign and may not have captured accurate public voting intentions. The poll predicted:

	Yes	No	Undecided
Opinion poll	70%	27%	3%

Morgan Polls published a poll in The Bulletin in mid-November. This poll predicted:

	Yes	No	Undecided
Opinion poll	57%	28%	15%

== Arguments for and against ==
=== Major political parties ===
The referendum was debated primarily on party lines, with Whitlam's Labor Party proposing the "Yes" case and Snedden's Liberal Party proposing the "No" case.

Whitlam's "Yes" case can be summarised into three arguments:

1. For the government to be effective in fighting inflation, it must have every possible weapon at its disposal to effectively curb inflation.
2. The government should have the power to prevent, where necessary and logical, at times of global economic uncertainty the excessive rise of prices in essential commodities.
3. It is logical that power over prices are exercised by the federal government and not by state government. State government have historically been unable and unwilling to utilise its power over prices in an effective manner.

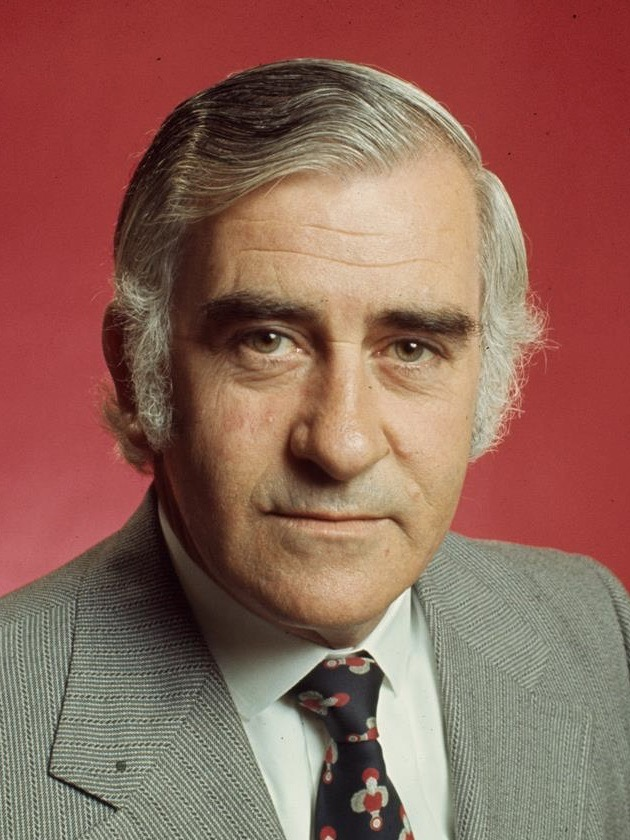
Billy Snedden, Leader of the Opposition, pictured in 1973.

Snedden's "No" case can be summarised into three arguments:

1. The uncertain economic circumstance is being taken advantage by government to get a power that has the potential to change the social and economic circumstances of Australia. A "No" vote would safeguard federalism, ensuring that an already centralist government would not gain additional power, which is essential in maintaining democracy and individual liberty. This was an especially potent argument with the Watergate scandal at its height, raising the level of scrutiny on governments globally.
2. There is no evidence that giving government power over prices will prove an effective tool in curbing inflation. Additionally, the government have been ambiguous and secretive of details in how it intends to use this power.
3. The opposition proposed differing policy in curbing inflation. The policy was threefold; pulling back public sector spending, a temporary freeze on incomes and prices and a national conference of federal and state governments, unions and employer organisations to agree on a plan to fight inflation.

A Melbourne-based newspaper, The Age, summarised the debate: "If you hate inflation, love your country and trust Gough Whitlam, vote "yes"... If you hate controls, fear the unknown and believe Bill Snedden, vote "no"..."

=== Minor parties ===
Other minor party stances included support for the proposal by the Australia Party and Aarons Communist Party. Opposition to the proposed changes were supported by the Democratic Labour Party and Maoists.

=== Organised groups ===
Groups other than political parties took clear sides in regard to the proposal outside of Parliament. It is a common occurrence for organised groups to participate actively in referendums, where they usually would not in general elections.

Trade unions such as the ACTU and Queensland Trades and Labour Unions along with other unions generally advocated in favour of the proposed change. Strong public opposition to the proposed changes came from organisations that considered the governments control of prices a direct threat to their industry. Such organisations included the Chamber of Commerce, Chamber of Manufacturers, Real Estate Institutes, the Wool Growers and Grazer’s Association, the NSW Institute of Public Affairs and various other organisations that had a vested interest in the proposal.

== Results ==
Result (Note: Handbook of the 44th Parliament (2014) "Part 5 - Referendums and Plebiscites - Referendum results". Parliamentary Library of Australia.)
State	Electoral roll	Ballots issued	For		Against		Informal
State	Electoral roll	Ballots issued	Vote	%	Vote	%	Informal
New South Wales	2,827,989	2,618,673	1,257,499	48.55	1,332,485	51.45	28,689
Victoria	2,129,494	2,001,924	891,144	45.18	1,081,120	54.82	29,660
Queensland	1,128,417	1,055,299	402,506	38.47	643,770	61.53	9,023
South Australia	737,573	700,333	282,754	41.16	404,181	58.84	13,398
Western Australia	588,789	542,122	169,605	31.90	362,121	68.10	10,396
Tasmania	241,207	229,016	85,631	38.22	138,416	61.78	4,969
Total for Commonwealth	7,653,469	7,147,367	3,089,139	43.81	3,962,093	56.19	96,135
Results	Obtained majority in no state and an overall minority of 872,954 votes. Not carried						

Before the 1977 Australian Referendum citizens living in Australian Territories were not able to vote in referendums.

== Aftermath ==
=== Prices Justification Tribunal ===
Following the failed referendum in 1974 Whitlam further strengthened the powers of the Prices Justification Tribunal. The power was extended so that the tribunal could inquire and report on prices charged by a company irrespective of their annual turnover. Where previously the tribunal could only inquire and report on companies with annual turnover of $20 million or more. These changes were aimed at examining retail prices and the price of imported goods, which were previously not examined by the tribunal. However, the jurisdiction of the tribunal was not extended to make the findings of inquiries mandatory for companies to comply with. Therefore, the tribunal was scrutinised for lacking the appropriate power to make real economic differences. Additionally, separate legislation that gave pricing power to state governments such as New South Wales, South Australia, Australian Capital Territory and Northern Territory meant that giving the tribunal further power over prices would contradict this existing legislation.

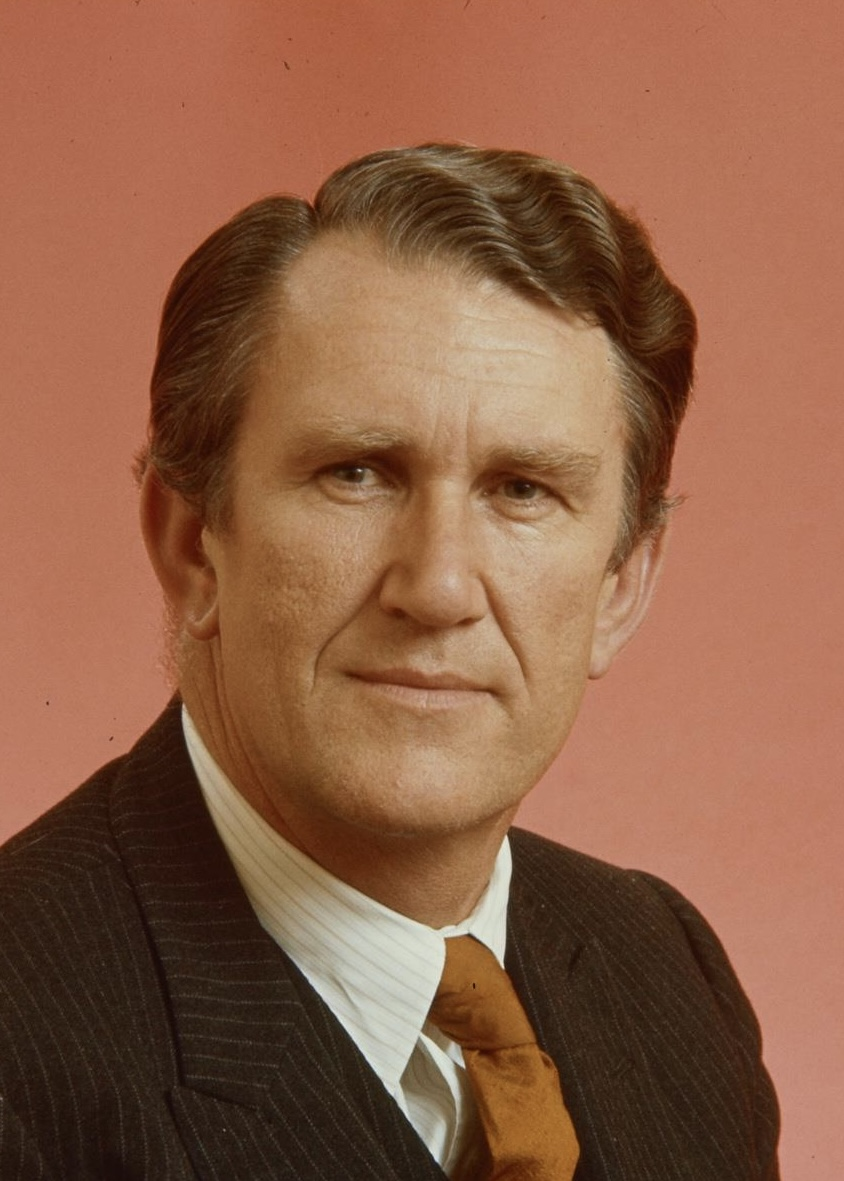
Malcolm Fraser, the 22nd Prime Minister of Australia, pictured in 1974.

The coverage and role of the Prices Justification Tribunal was reduced, as Fraser's Liberal party took office in 1975. In addition to scrutiny over the ineffective nature of the tribunal, concerns were raised about compliance costs, the overlapping of the tribunals operations with existing government bodies and the effect of the tribunal on industry efficiency and investment decisions. The tribunal was ultimately abolished in 1981.

=== Economic policy ===
The rejection of the referendum and the ultimate reduction of the Prices Justification Tribunal, meant that other economic policies took greater credence. As such two key economic policies were adopted; monetary targeting and indexation.

Following the global trend of inflation targeting, the Reserve Bank of Australia employed a loose form of monetary targeting. The policy objective was to reduce the rate of increase in domestic prices. From 1976 to 1985, between which monetary targeting was employed, the inflation rate decreased from 13% to 8.4%. Although the decline in inflation would suggest this policy was a success, the policy relied on a consistent and stable relationship between growth rates and price changes. However, this period proved this consistent relationship was not the case suggesting a causal link between the decrease in domestic prices and monetary targeting. This led to the RBA's ultimate transition to inflation targeting.

Indexation was adopted by the Arbitration Commission in 1975, on the basis that it would restrain wage increases. Indexation linked wage increases to past price increases. Inflation began to decrease with the establishment of indexation, decreasing from a peak of nearly 20% in 1975 to 10% by 1977. This showed the effectiveness of wage indexation in constraining wage increases. However, after 1977 wages rapidly increased due to pressure from unions who argued that wage increases were falling behind cost of living increases. The Arbitration Commission was unable to keep relevant parties in agreement with its indexation approach. As such indexation was abolished in 1981.

Although these policies had contributed to decreasing the inflation rate to 10% in 1977, further success proved difficult. In 1977 Australia experienced high economic growth and rising oil prices which forced an increase in inflation before it was back under control.

== See also ==
- Another question was put to the people on the same day, Australian referendum, 1973 (Incomes)
- Referendums in Australia
- History of Australia
- Politics of Australia
