= 2013 Australian constitutional referendum attempt =

Proposal for direct local council funding

An Australian constitutional referendum was planned, and then abandoned, in 2013.

== History ==
The referendum was proposed to change section 96 of the Constitution of Australia to allow the Commonwealth of Australia to directly fund local councils. Similar referendums failed to pass in 1974 and 1988.

The proposed constitutional alteration was passed by both Houses of Parliament as the Constitution Alteration (Local Government) 2013.

The "yes" campaign was supported by both the Labor government and the opposition leader Tony Abbott.

The federal government allocated $10 million to the "yes" campaign, but just $500,000 to the "no" campaign. The difference in funding led seven senators from the Coalition to vote against the referendum bill in the Senate, although it passed by 46 votes to eight.

Section 128 of the Constitution requires a proposed constitutional amendment be submitted to the electors in a referendum no less than two months but no later than six months after passage. The referendum was originally planned to be held on the same day as the 2013 federal election, originally set for 14 September 2013. However, on 4 August, Prime Minister Kevin Rudd changed the general election date to 7 September, and Local Government Minister Catherine King announced that the referendum would be held on a later date.

The Australian Labor Party was defeated at the 7 September 2013 federal election, and in October 2013 the Abbott Coalition government announced it would not proceed with the referendum.
