= 1944 Australian Post-War Reconstruction and Democratic Rights referendum =

Unsuccessful referendum in Australia

- 19 August 1944
- Do you approve of the proposed law for the alteration of the Constitution entitled — "Constitution Alteration (Post-War Reconstruction and Democratic Rights) 1944" ?
- Outcome: Amendment Failed

Results
Choice	Votes	%
Yes	1,963,400	45.99%
No	2,305,418	54.01%
Valid votes	4,268,818	98.69%
Invalid or blank votes	56,633	1.31%
Total votes	4,325,451	100.00%
Registered voters/turnout	4,483,949	96.47%

The Constitution Alteration (Post-War Reconstruction and Democratic Rights) Bill 1944 was an unsuccessful proposal to alter the Australian Constitution to give the Commonwealth an additional 14 powers for a period of five years, with Prime Minister John Curtin saying that maintaining wartime controls was necessary for Australia to re-adjust to peacetime conditions. It was put to voters for approval in an Australian referendum held on 19 August 1944.

== Background ==
In 1942 Attorney-General H. V. Evatt introduced the Constitution Alteration (War Aims and Reconstruction) Bill 1942 to parliament to give plenary power to the federal government to legislate on any matter it declared relevant to achieving 'economic security and social justice'. The bill was met with heavy opposition, and the Curtin government decided to instead hold a convention to reach consensus on the bill and on the federal powers needed for post-war reconstruction. The convention decided against amending the Constitution, agreeing unanimously that the states would instead use their referral powers to temporarily give the federal government the authority to legislate in 14 specific areas.

After only some of the states passed the necessary legislation to give effect to this decision, Evatt introduced new legislation in 1944 for the agreed powers from the convention to be conferred through a constitutional amendment, requiring a referendum. He also amended the bill to include a guaranteed freedom of speech in the proposal, and to expand the constitution's freedom of religion provision to the states.

== Proposed amendment ==
The referendum was known as the "14 powers", or the "14 points referendum". It sought to give the federal government power, over a period of five years, to legislate on a wide variety of matters, including control over employment, profiteering and prices, and related subjects. The points referring to aviation, employment, marketing, trusts, corporations, combines and monopolies had previously been the subject of referendums advanced by both Labor and conservative parties that had not been carried.

=== The 14 powers ===
The powers the government sought to gain through the referendum included:

- The rehabilitation of former servicemen
- National health
- Family allowances
- Employment and unemployment
- The ability to legislate for 'The People Of The Aboriginal Race'
- Corporations, or combines
- Foreign investment
- Trust laws
- Monopolies
- Air transport
- Uniformity of railway gauges
- Marketing of commodities
- Manufacturing (production) and sales of goods
- National infrastructure (subject to state approval)

Many of these powers also included limitations as safeguards against the abuse of legislative power.

=== Restrictions on government power ===
- Freedom of speech

Freedom of speech and freedom of expression were restrictions on state and government power that the commonwealth sought to legislate on.

- Freedom of religion

The government also sought to apply the right to freedom of religion to state governments.

=== Question ===
The referendum was put in a single question:

Do you approve of the proposed law for the alteration of the Constitution entitled 'Constitution Alteration (Post-War Reconstruction and Democratic Rights) 1944'?

== For and against ==
The proposal was put forward and supported by the Australian Labor Party government. It was opposed by the federal opposition (United Australia Party and the Country Party).

=== For ===
Prime Minister John Curtin gave his broadcast to the nation on 25 July 1944. The Prime Minister said to abandon wartime controls on the declaration of peace would cause disorganization to the social system and destroy the capacity of the system to meet the need of the first few disturbed years after the war.

=== Against ===
The Country Party leader, Arthur Fadden, gave his broadcast against the motion, stating: Its proposal means that in peacetime, you will work under government compulsion, you will eat and wear what the bureaucrats ration out to you: you will live in mass-produced government dwellings: and your children will work wherever the bureaucrats tell them to work! If granted nothing can be made, produced, built or grown without permission. Everything that is grown or made, carried or carted, sold or exchanged will be under government control. A yes vote would enable the Government to implement Labor's policy of socialization. Nationalization of Industry would follow.

== Results ==
Do you approve of the proposed law for the alteration of the Constitution entitled 'Constitution Alteration (Post-War Reconstruction and Democratic Rights) 1944'?

Result (Note: Handbook of the 44th Parliament (2014) "Part 5 - Referendums and Plebiscites - Referendum results". Parliamentary Library of Australia.)
State	Electoral roll	Ballots issued	For		Against		Informal
State	Electoral roll	Ballots issued	Vote	%	Vote	%	Informal
New South Wales	1,758,166	1,694,119	759,211	45.44	911,680	54.56	23,228
Victoria	1,266,662	1,227,571	597,848	49.31	614,487	50.69	15,236
Queensland	633,907	599,568	216,262	36.52	375,862	63.48	7,444
South Australia	403,133	392,443	196,294	50.64	191,317	49.36	4,832
Western Australia	278,722	272,339	140,399	52.25	128,303	47.75	3,637
Tasmania	143,359	139,411	53,386	38.92	83,769	61.08	2,256
Armed forces (Note: Armed forces totals are also included in their respective states.)		417,082	218,452		195,148		3,482
Total for Commonwealth	4,483,949	4,325,451	1,963,400	45.99	2,305,418	54.01	56,633
Results	Obtained majority in two states and an overall minority of 342,018 votes. Not carried						

== See also ==
- Curtin government
- Politics of Australia
- Referendums in Australia
