= Australian Parliamentary Handbook =

Official publication of the Australian parliament

The Australian Parliamentary Handbook (officially the Parliamentary Handbook of the Commonwealth of Australia), is the official record of the Parliament of Australia. The handbook is published once during each three-year Parliament by the Parliamentary Library of Australia, within the Department of Parliamentary Services, under the authority of the Parliament.

The first edition of the Handbook was released in 1915 under the title "Biographical Handbook and Record of Elections for the Parliament of the Commonwealth." This publication followed a resolution by the Joint Library Committee to produce a handbook containing political biographies of all members of both Houses since Federation in 1901, along with other pertinent information. Since its inception, there have been 30 editions of the Handbook. An edition has been published after every federal election since 1917, except for the years 1928 (due to another election the following year), 1940 and 1943 (owing to wartime printing restrictions), 1946 and 1949 (for reasons unknown), and 1954 (following a very short Parliament). The 1976 edition was described as a "supplement to the 19th edition," which was published in 1975.

Until the election of the Whitlam Labor government in 1972, the Handbook was officially titled the Commonwealth Parliamentary Handbook. Whitlam's desire to replace the phrase "Commonwealth of Australia" with the word "Australia" in all official usages led to the renaming of the Handbook's 18th edition in 1973 as the Australian Parliamentary Handbook. The Fraser Liberal government renamed the Handbook Parliamentary Handbook of the Commonwealth of Australia.

For many years the Handbook was the only readily accessible source of statistical information about elections to the Australian Parliament. Since the 1970s, however, these have been published separately by the Australian Electoral Commission (AEC) and are now easily accessible at the AEC website (current elections only) or at Adam Carr's Election Archive (all elections since 1901).

The modern Handbook contains full biographies of all Members and Senators, details of the Ministry and Shadow Ministry, membership of all Parliamentary committees, statistical information on the composition of the Parliament, summaries of recent election results, the text of the Australian Constitution, results of referendums to change the Constitution, and historical information including the names and career details of all Members and Senators since 1901.

The Handbook is now available in an online edition.
