= Daylight Saving for South East Queensland Referendum Bill 2010 =

Daylight Saving referendum bill tabled in Queensland Parliament in 2010

The Daylight Saving for South East Queensland Referendum Bill 2010 was a bill tabled in the Queensland Parliament on 14 April 2010, by Independent Member Peter Wellington. Wellington had called for a referendum to be held at the next State election on introduction of daylight saving time for South East Queensland. The Bill proposed a split-time zone for the state of Queensland and had suggested that the local government areas of Brisbane, Gold Coast, Sunshine Coast, Ipswich, Logan, Scenic Rim, Redland and Moreton Bay be included in the daylight saving time zone, while the rest of the state remains on standard time.

== Drafting ==
In early 2010, the Daylight Saving for South East Queensland (DS4SEQ) political party approached Wellington to introduce a private member's bill. As Wellington agreed with the principles of the DS4SEQ proposal, specifically the dual time zone arrangement, he drafted the Daylight Saving for South East Queensland Referendum Bill 2010.

== Response ==
In response to this bill, Leader of the Opposition John-Paul Langbroek, immediately announced that he would not support the bill, saying "We will not be supporting a referendum on daylight saving," and "I don't want to make an interstate problem an intrastate problem."

The Premier of Queensland, Anna Bligh, announced a community consultation process, which resulted in over 74,000 respondents participating, 64 per cent of whom supported a trial of daylight saving, while 63 per cent were also in favour of holding a referendum. On 7 June 2010, and after reviewing the favourable consultation results, Bligh announced that her Government would not support the bill because regional Queenslanders were overwhelmingly opposed to daylight saving. DS4SEQ called for Bligh and her government to reconsider their position.

The bill was defeated in Queensland Parliament on 15 June 2011.

== Previous daylight saving referendum ==
Queensland had had one referendum on daylight saving, held on 22 February 1992, with the question: "Are you in favour of daylight saving?", which was defeated with a 54.5 per cent 'no' vote. The vote on this referendum was after Queensland had trialled daylight saving over a three-year period, from 1989/90 to 1991/92. The referendum result displayed a distinct trend—that public opinion on daylight saving in Queensland is geographically divided, with the 'no' vote strongest in the north and west regional districts, while the 'yes' vote was strongest in the state's metropolitan south-east.

== See also ==
- Time in Australia
- Daylight saving time around the world
