= Electoral results for the district of Coomera =

Queensland, Australia, district election results

This is a list of electoral results for the electoral district of Coomera in Queensland state elections.

== Members for Coomera ==
Member	Party	Term
Michael Crandon	Liberal National	2009–present

== Election results ==
=== Elections in the 2020s ===
2024 Queensland state election: Coomera
Party	Candidate	Votes	%	±%
Liberal National	Michael Crandon	19,108	44.35	+4.38
Labor	Chris Johnson	11,897	27.61	−8.69
One Nation	Nick Muir	4,575	10.62	+2.30
Greens	Stuart Fletcher	2,847	6.61	−1.61
Legalise Cannabis	Suzette Luyken	2,667	6.19	+6.19
Family First	Nathan O'Brien	1,993	4.62	+4.62
Total formal votes		43,087	95.16	+0.06
Informal votes		2,193	4.84	−0.06
Turnout		45,280	84.03	−0.30
Two-party-preferred result
Liberal National	Michael Crandon	25,866	60.03	+8.95
Labor	Chris Johnson	17,221	39.97	−8.95
Liberal National hold		Swing	+8.95	

2020 Queensland state election: Coomera
Party	Candidate	Votes	%	±%
Liberal National	Michael Crandon	14,655	39.97	+0.62
Labor	Chris Johnson	13,310	36.30	+5.06
One Nation	Tabita Wilkinson	3,051	8.32	−12.14
Greens	Lissy Gavranich	3,015	8.22	−0.72
Animal Justice	Darryl Prout	977	2.66	+2.66
United Australia	Heath Gallagher	618	1.69	+1.69
Independent	Kris Bourbon	558	1.52	+1.52
Informed Medical Options	She D'Montford	481	1.31	+1.31
Total formal votes		36,665	95.10	+0.91
Informal votes		1,888	4.90	−0.91
Turnout		38,553	84.33	+0.25
Two-party-preferred result
Liberal National	Michael Crandon	18,727	51.08	−2.40
Labor	Chris Johnson	17,938	48.92	+2.40
Liberal National hold		Swing	−2.40	

=== Elections in the 2010s ===
2017 Queensland state election: Coomera
Party	Candidate	Votes	%	±%
Liberal National	Michael Crandon	11,535	39.4	−7.8
Labor	Christopher Johnson	9,158	31.2	−1.1
One Nation	Ronald Pigdon	5,998	20.5	+20.5
Greens	Tayla Kerwin	2,620	8.9	+3.3
Total formal votes		29,311	94.2	−3.2
Informal votes		1,806	5.8	+3.2
Turnout		31,117	84.1	+6.4
Two-party-preferred result
Liberal National	Michael Crandon	15,673	53.5	−2.3
Labor	Christopher Johnson	13,638	46.5	+2.3
Liberal National hold		Swing	−2.3	

2015 Queensland state election: Coomera
Party	Candidate	Votes	%	±%
Liberal National	Michael Crandon	16,916	50.53	−11.36
Labor	Brett McCreadie	10,377	31.00	+11.10
Palmer United	Shirley Morgan	3,115	9.30	+9.30
Greens	Chris Wisbey	1,834	5.48	−0.56
Family First	Cathy O'Brien	1,236	3.69	+3.69
Total formal votes		33,478	97.41	+0.11
Informal votes		889	2.59	−0.11
Turnout		34,367	87.87	−2.76
Two-party-preferred result
Liberal National	Michael Crandon	18,018	58.53	−14.73
Labor	Brett McCreadie	12,766	41.47	+14.73
Liberal National hold		Swing	−14.73	

2012 Queensland state election: Coomera
Party	Candidate	Votes	%	±%
Liberal National	Michael Crandon	17,951	61.89	+14.76
Labor	Graeme Higgs	5,771	19.90	−22.93
Katter's Australian	Peter Cobb	2,902	10.01	+10.01
Greens	Chris Wisbey	1,751	6.04	−0.11
Independent	Rowan Harrip	628	2.17	+2.17
Total formal votes		29,003	97.30	−0.18
Informal votes		805	2.70	+0.18
Turnout		29,808	90.63	+1.03
Two-party-preferred result
Liberal National	Michael Crandon	18,932	73.26	+21.35
Labor	Graeme Higgs	6,910	26.74	−21.35
Liberal National hold		Swing	+21.35	

=== Elections in the 2000s ===
2009 Queensland state election: Coomera
Party	Candidate	Votes	%	±%
Liberal National	Michael Crandon	11,840	47.1	+9.5
Labor	Leeanne Enoch	10,761	42.8	−10.3
Greens	Petrina Maizey	1,545	6.1	+0.3
DS4SEQ	Russell Anderson	977	3.9	+3.9
Total formal votes		25,123	96.9	
Informal votes		650	3.1	
Turnout		25,773	89.6	
Two-party-preferred result
Liberal National	Michael Crandon	12,404	51.9	+10.2
Labor	Leeanne Enoch	11,489	48.1	−10.2
Liberal National gain from Labor		Swing	+10.2	
