= Stephen J. Turnovsky =

New Zealand economist (born 1941)

- Born: 1941 (age 84–85); Wellington, New Zealand

Academic background
- Education: Harvard University; Victoria University of Wellington

Academic work
- Discipline: Macroeconomics, international economics
- Institutions: University of Washington; University of Illinois at Urbana–Champaign; Australian National University
- Website: Information at IDEAS / RePEc

Stephen J. Turnovsky (born 1941) is a New Zealand economist and the Ford and Louisa Van Voorhis Professor of Political Economy at the University of Washington. He is one of the most highly cited economists in the world. As of November 2015, Research Papers in Economics ranks him as the 32nd most influential economist. RePEc reports that he has published over 5000 pages in academic journals, making him one of the top 5 most prolific economists.

A native of Wellington, New Zealand, Turnosky attended Victoria University of Wellington, majoring in mathematics and economics. After earning a bachelor's degree in 1962, and a master's in 1963, he continued his education at Harvard University, receiving his Ph.D. In 1968.

Turnovsky's economic interests are largely centered around macroeconomics. Turnovsky also serves on various advisory boards for a number of journals. He currently serves as a co-editor of Macroeconomics Dynamics and as an associate editor of the Journal of Public Economic Theory.
