= Snedden =

Snedden is a surname. Notable people with the surname include:

- Billy Snedden (1926–1987), Australian politician
- Bob Snedden (1867–1931), South African rugby union footballer
- Charles Willis "Bill" Snedden (1913–1989), publisher of the Fairbanks Daily News-Miner from 1950
- Christopher Snedden, Australian political scientist
- Colin Snedden (1918–2011), New Zealand cricketer
- James Snedden (1849–1919?), Scottish-born recipient of the Medal of Honor for valor during the American Civil War
- Martin Snedden (born 1958), New Zealand cricketer
- Nessie Snedden (1892–1968), New Zealand cricketer
- Warwick Snedden (1920–1990), New Zealand cricketer
- James Sneddon (2005–), American soccer player

== See also ==
- Sneddon (disambiguation)
