= 1992 Queensland daylight saving referendum =

Referendum held in Queensland, Australia

Queensland Daylight Saving referendum, 1992
22 February 1992
- Are you in favour of daylight saving

Results
Choice	Votes	%
Yes	744,686	45.50%
No	892,119	54.50%
Valid votes	1,636,805	99.56%
Invalid or blank votes	7,313	0.44%
Total votes	1,644,118	100.00%
Registered voters/turnout	1,835,727	89.56%
- Results by electorate

Daylight saving time was trialled in the state of Queensland, Australia, during the 1989/90 season, with the trial extended for a further two years—1990/91 and 1991/92. The last full day of daylight saving in Queensland was Saturday 29 February 1992, with clocks officially wound back an hour on Sunday 1 March at 3am.

== Daylight Saving Task Force ==
During the initial one-year trial in 1989/90, a Daylight Saving Task Force was appointed to monitor and report community opinions, as well as provide recommendations to the Queensland Government. The task force made five recommendations, of which only two were implemented, these being: the extension of the daylight saving trial for a further two years (1990/91 – 1991/92); and that a statewide referendum be held after the extended daylight saving trial period. The task force had noted that the Brisbane and Moreton regions (south-east Queensland) were "clearly in favour of daylight saving", which led them to the following further recommendation: "that daylight saving be introduced for that part of the State east of 151°East longitude", i.e., that there be a dual time zone arrangement for Queensland.

== Daylight saving referendum ==
After trialling daylight saving in Queensland for a total of three years, a referendum was held on 22 February 1992, with the question: "Are you in favour of daylight saving?" It was defeated with a 54.5% 'no' vote. The referendum result displayed the same distinct trend that the task force had recognised—that public opinion on daylight saving in Queensland is geographically divided, with the 'no' vote strongest in the north and west regional districts, while the 'yes' vote was strongest in the state's metropolitan south-east.

== See also ==
- Time in Australia
- Daylight saving time
