= 1984 Western Australian daylight saving referendum =

Western Australian Daylight Saving referendum, 1984
7 April 1984
- Are you in favour of the standard time in the State being advanced one hour from the last Sunday in October in each year until the first Sunday in the following March?

Results
Choice	Votes	%
Yes	329,536	45.65%
No	392,340	54.35%

A referendum was held on 7 April 1984 in the Australian state of Western Australia on the topic of introducing daylight saving. It was the second of four such proposals which have been put to Western Australian voters, and followed a trial over the 1983–1984 summer. The referendum failed to pass, with a 54.35% majority voting against the proposal.

== Referendum results ==
Question: Are you in favour of the standard time in the State being advanced one hour from the last Sunday in October in each year until the first Sunday in March the following year?

Trial Period	Referendum Date	Outcome
30 October 1983 – 4 March 1984	7 April 1984	REJECTED

YES	NO
45.65%	54.35%
