= 1975 Western Australian daylight saving referendum =

Western Australian daylight saving referendum, 1975
8 March 1975
- Are you in favour of the standard time in the State being advanced one hour from the last Sunday in October in each year until the first Sunday in March next following?

Results
Choice	Votes	%
Yes	250,644	46.34%
No	290,179	53.66%

A referendum was held on 8 March 1975 in the Australian state of Western Australia on the topic of introducing daylight saving. It was the first of four such proposals which have been put to Western Australian voters and followed a trial over the 1974–1975 summer, from 27 October 1974 until 2 March 1975. The referendum failed to pass, with 53.66% voting against the proposal.

== Referendum results ==
Question: Are you in favour of the standard time in the State being advanced one hour from the last Sunday in October in each year until the first Sunday in March next following?

Result
District	Valid votes	For		Against	
District	Valid votes	Vote	%	Vote	%
Albany	7,060	3,843	54.43	3,217	45.57
Ascot	13,304	6,234	46.86	7,070	53.14
Avon	6,945	1,682	24.22	5,263	75.78
Balga	14,253	7,649	53.67	6,604	46.33
Boulder-Dundas	6,579	3,102	47.15	3,477	52.85
Bunbury	7,414	3,508	47.32	3,906	52.68
Canning	21,856	12,474	57.07	9,382	42.93
Clontarf	14,981	7,778	51.92	7,203	48.08
Cockburn	15,817	8,718	55.12	7,099	44.88
Collie	7,032	2,033	28.91	4,999	71.09
Cottesloe	13,559	7,071	52.15	6,488	47.85
Dale	10,459	5,218	49.89	5,241	50.11
East Melville	15,645	8,586	54.88	7,059	45.12
Floreat	14,982	8,295	55.37	6,687	44.63
Fremantle	13,969	6,698	47.95	7,271	52.05
Gascoyne	2,777	993	35.76	1,784	64.24
Geraldton	7,063	2,347	33.23	4,716	66.77
Greenough	6,478	1,194	18.43	5,284	81.57
Kalamunda	9,161	4,648	50.74	4,513	49.26
Kalgoorlie	5,994	2,749	45.86	3,245	54.14
Karrinyup	19,709	11,236	57.01	8,473	42.99
Katanning	6,880	1,597	23.21	5,283	76.79
Kimberley	2,530	1,274	50.36	1,256	49.64
Maylands	14,317	6,643	46.40	7,674	53.60
Melville	14,393	7,350	51.07	7,043	48.93
Merredin-Yilgarn	6,477	1,218	18.81	5,259	81.19
Moore	6,578	1,056	16.05	5,522	83.95
Morley	17,694	9,777	55.26	7,917	44.74
Mount Hawthorn	13,527	6,269	46.34	7,258	53.66
Mount Lawley	14,297	7,159	50.07	7,138	49.93
Mount Marshall	6,076	840	13.82	5,236	86.18
Mundaring	8,210	3,872	47.16	4,338	52.84
Murchison-Eyre	1,535	479	31.21	1,056	68.79
Murray	7,903	2,535	32.08	5,368	67.92
Narrogin	7,104	1,407	19.81	5,697	80.19
Nedlands	13,316	6,809	51.13	6,507	48.87
Perth	11,387	5,177	45.46	6,210	54.54
Pilbara	7,555	4,121	54.55	3,434	45.45
Rockingham	8,560	4,445	51.93	4,115	48.07
Roe	7,230	2,308	31.92	4,922	68.08
Scarborough	14,339	7,836	54.65	6,503	45.35
South Perth	12,948	6,555	50.63	6,393	49.37
Stirling	7,047	2,290	32.50	4,757	67.50
Subiaco	12,589	6,376	50.65	6,213	49.35
Swan	14,738	6,364	43.18	8,374	56.82
Toodyay	17,867	9,506	53.20	8,361	46.8
Vasse	7,817	2,479	31.71	5,338	68.29
Victoria Park	13,918	6,429	46.19	7,489	53.81
Warren	6,587	2,108	32.00	4,479	68.00
Wellington	7,562	2,937	38.84	4,625	61.16
Welshpool	14,805	7,372	49.79	7,433	50.21
Total	540,823	250,644	46.34	290,179	53.66
Result	An overall minority of 39,535 votes. Rejected				
