= 1992 Western Australian daylight saving referendum =

Western Australian Daylight Saving referendum, 1992
4 April 1992
- Are you in favour of the standard time in the State being advanced one hour from the last Sunday in October 1992 until the first Sunday in March 1993 and in similar fashion for each year thereafter?

Results
Choice	Votes	%
Yes	399,441	46.86%
No	452,985	53.14%

A referendum was held on 4 April 1992 in the Australian state of Western Australia on the topic of introducing daylight saving. It was the third of four such proposals which have been put to Western Australian voters, and followed a trial over the 1991–1992 summer. The referendum failed to pass, with a majority of 53.14% voting against the proposal.

== Referendum results ==
Question: Are you in favour of the standard time in the State being advanced one hour from the last Sunday in October 1992 until the first Sunday in March 1993 and in similar fashion for each year thereafter?

Trial Period	Referendum Date	Outcome
17 November 1991 – 1 March 1992	4 April 1992	REJECTED

YES	NO
46.86%	53.14%
