= Parliamentary Library of Australia =

The Parliamentary Library of Australia (or Commonwealth Parliamentary Library) is the library of the Parliament of Australia, administered by its Department of Parliamentary Services. It provides library services to elected officials, namely members of the Senate and House of Representatives, as well as their staff, parliamentary committees, the Governor-General of Australia, and the staff of parliamentary departments.

== History ==
The library was established in 1901, the year of the federation of the Commonwealth of Australia. Control of the new library was controversial as the fledgling parliament was located in Melbourne where the Victorian premier and the library committee of the State Library of Victoria sought to influence the control and management of the library.

From 1923 the library used two names describing the two roles and two collections Commonwealth Parliament Library which designated the parliamentary collection and Commonwealth National Library to designate the national collection. The collections were relocated from Melbourne to Canberra in 1927.

Sir Harold White served as Parliamentary Librarian from 1947 to 1967. In 1960 the National Library of Australia was created by act of parliament. The collections were separated when the National Library of Australia building was completed.

== Organisation and services ==
The Parliamentary Library lies within the Department of Parliamentary Services (DPS), one of four departments supporting the functioning of Parliament.

The staff of the Library is led by the Parliamentary Librarian, a statutory officer responsible for the control and management of the Library, who is on the DPS Executive Committee. This committee is the department's primary governance body, comprising the Secretary (chair), Deputy Secretary, Parliamentary Librarian, Chief Operating Officer, Chief Information Officer, First Assistant Secretary for Building and Security Division and Chief Finance Officer.

As of May 2020, the Parliamentary Librarian is Dr Dianne Heriot. First appointed in February 2012, her five-year term was extended on 10 May 2017.

The staff provide a media monitoring service, research and analysis as well as managing the library collection.

The Parliamentary Library publishes the Australian Parliamentary Handbook, which provides information about Parliament including the parliamentary service and political careers of Senators and Members, parliamentary committees and elections.

== See also ==
- National Library of Australia
- John Brudenall
