= R v Burgess; Ex parte Henry =

Judgement of the High Court of Australia

- Court: High Court of Australia
- Full case name: The King v Burgess; Ex parte Henry
- Decided: 10 November 1936
- Citations: [1936] HCA 52, (1936) 55 CLR 608

Case history
- Related actions: R v Poole; Ex parte Henry (1939) 61 CLR 634

Court membership
- Judges sitting: Latham CJ, Starke, Dixon, Evatt & McTiernan JJ

Case opinions
- (5:0) The Commonwealth government's power to regulate interstate trade and commerce does not extend to intrastate trade and commerce. (per Latham CJ, Starke, Dixon, Evatt & McTiernan JJ) (3:2) The implementation of an international treaty is valid where the treaty is bona fide and the subject matter is of international concern. (per Latham CJ, Starke, Evatt & McTiernan JJ; Dixon J dissenting) (4:1) The regulations were invalid because they did not carry out and give effect to the convention. (per Latham CJ, Dixon, Evatt & McTiernan JJ; Starke J dissenting)

R v Burgess; Ex parte Henry is a 1936 High Court of Australia case where the majority took a broad view of the external affairs power in the Constitution but held that the interstate trade and commerce power delineated trade and commerce within a state, rejecting an argument that the power extended to activities that were commingled with interstate activities. The court set aside the conviction of daredevil pilot Goya Henry for breach of the regulations as they went further than was necessary to carry out and give effect to the convention.

== Background ==
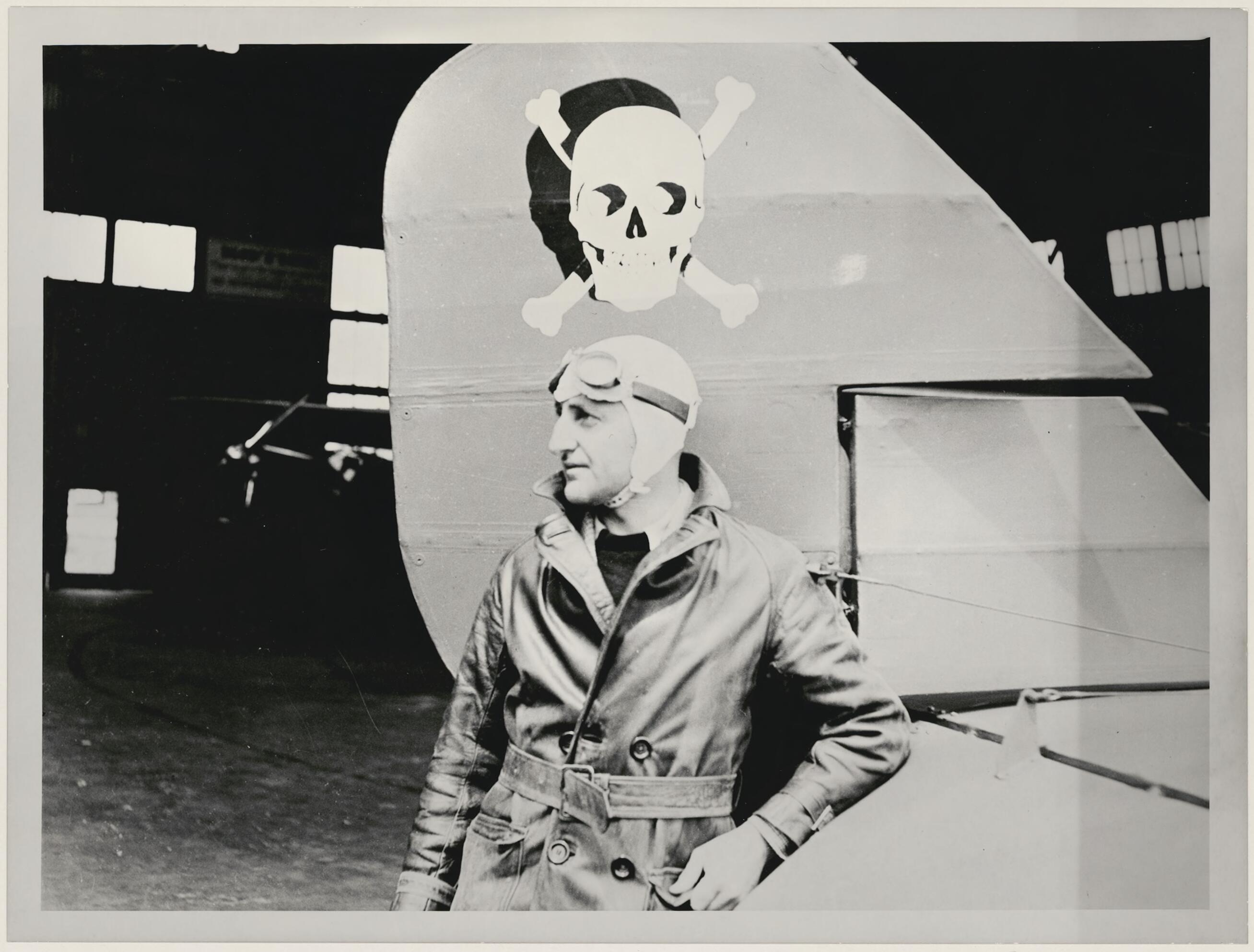
Aviator Goya Henry in front of his Genairco Biplane

In 1919 Australia had entered into the Convention Relating to the Regulation of Aerial Navigation, and parliament enacted the Aircraft Navigation Act 1920, which authorised the Governor-General to make regulations to give effect to the convention. Henry was convicted of flying without a license, having flown around, over and under the Sydney Harbour Bridge. The Commonwealth relied upon 3 sources of constitutional power, interstate trade and commerce, foreign affairs and territories.

Goya Henry was an aviator who had his aviation licence suspended. Two days after the suspension he nevertheless flew a plane, setting off from Mascot airport and then flying around, over and under the Sydney Harbour Bridge. He was convicted of breaching regulation 6 of the federal Air Navigation Regulations which prohibited an unlicensed person from flying an aircraft "within the limits of the Commonwealth". The regulations were made pursuant to section 4 of the Aircraft Navigation Act 1920, which authorised the Governor-General to make regulations to give effect to the Convention for the Regulation of Aerial Navigation. He challenged the constitutional validity of the regulation.

== Decision ==
=== External affairs ===
The Constitution gave no express power to the Commonwealth to regulate aviation, a subject that did not exist when the Constitution was drafted at the end of the 19th century. The Commonwealth argued that its rules were made in pursuance of an international convention and were, therefore, laws with respect to external affairs.

The majority (Latham CJ, Evatt & McTiernan JJ) took a broad view of the external affairs power, and accepted that the Commonwealth could enact legislation pursuant to a bona fide international treaty. Latham CJ dismissed arguments attempting to exclude the external affairs power from encompassing certain domestic subjects. Evatt and McTiernan JJ concluded that once a treaty was signed and entered into, the provisions contained therein were brought under the external affairs power by virtue of their inclusion in the treaty.

The minority (Starke & Dixon JJ) took a narrower approach, with Starke J holding that the treaty may have to be 'of sufficient international significance to make it a legitimate subject for international co-operation and agreement', however this convention was of sufficient significance. Dixon J considered that the power of the Commonwealth to implement treaties through legislation was necessarily limited by the federal nature of the Constitution, so the subject matter of the treaty upon which it was based had to be 'indisputably international in character'.

Even under the broad view of the external affairs power, the Court invalidated the regulations on the grounds that they did not carry out and give effect to the conventions of the treaty.

=== Trade and commerce ===
The only other power that seemed available was 'trade and commerce with other countries and among the States'. Henry however, had not been flying from or to any other state or country. The Commonwealth argued that the commingling in air routes and airports of aircraft proceeding intrastate with those traveling interstate, enabled it to control all aircraft. The Court rejected the commingling argument, preferring to maintain a distinction between interstate and intrastate trade. Henry could not be prevented by the Commonwealth from stunt-flying around Sydney Harbour under the commerce power. The Constitution clearly distinguished between intrastate and interstate commerce, and confined the Commonwealth to the latter.

== Aftermath ==
The Commonwealth held a referendum in 1937 to have the Constitution amended to give it express power over aviation. Although the measure received 53.56% of the 'yes' vote nationwide, it did not gain a majority support in a majority of states, with only Victoria and Queensland supporting the measure. The uniform regulation of air navigation was achieved by uniform state laws which applied the Commonwealth regulations.

In 1939 Henry was convicted of another aviation offence, this time flying too low over Mascot aerodrome. The High Court upheld the 1937 regulations and his conviction.

== See also ==
- Section 51(i) of the Australian Constitution
- Section 51(xxix) of the Australian Constitution
- Australian constitutional law
