= Seaplane Squadron RAAF =

Royal Australian Air Force squadron

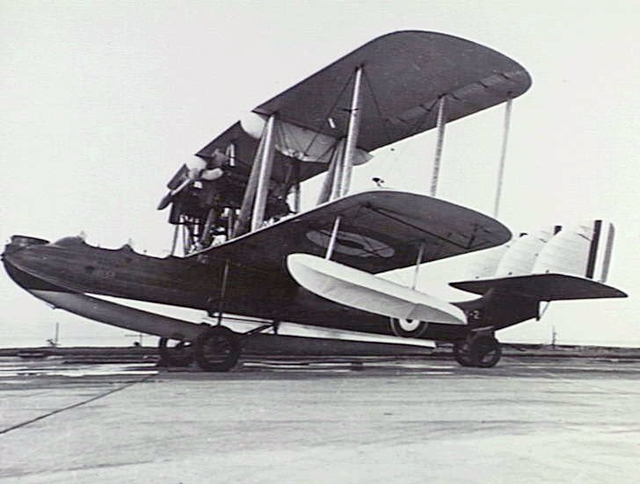
- Supermarine Southampton at RAAF Point Cook in 1939
- Active: 1928–1939
- Country: Australia
- Branch: Royal Australian Air Force
- Role: Seaplane training/reconnaissance
- Part of: No. 1 Flying Training School
- Headquarters: RAAF Point Cook

Commanders
- Notable commanders: Bill Garing (1937, 1938)

Aircraft flown
- Patrol: Supermarine Southampton

Seaplane Squadron was a flying unit of the Royal Australian Air Force (RAAF) between the wars. It operated Supermarine Southampton flying boats from January 1928, as well as other types. Along with Fighter Squadron, Seaplane Squadron was a component of No. 1 Flying Training School, based at RAAF Point Cook, Victoria. Seaplane Squadron was responsible for coastal reconnaissance, training aircrew to operate seaplanes, and supporting the Royal Australian Navy. It also conducted survey flights over remote parts of Australia and mapped the Darwin–Sydney section of the Empire Air Mail Scheme route. Seaplane Squadron was disbanded in June 1939.

== History ==
Although the first entry in Seaplane Squadron records is dated 16 February 1934, the official history of the Royal Australian Air Force (RAAF) between the wars refers to the unit as having been in operation when Australia acquired two Supermarine Southampton flying boats, which entered service in January 1928. The Southamptons formed a coastal reconnaissance flight within Seaplane Squadron, which also operated other aircraft for seaplane training. Seaplane Squadron was one of two formations raised at RAAF Point Cook, Victoria, under the auspices of No. 1 Flying Training School (No. 1 FTS), the other being Fighter Squadron, which operated Bristol Bulldogs. No. 1 FTS had been the first unit to be formed as part of the new Australian Air Force on 31 March 1921 (the prefix "Royal" was added in August that year).

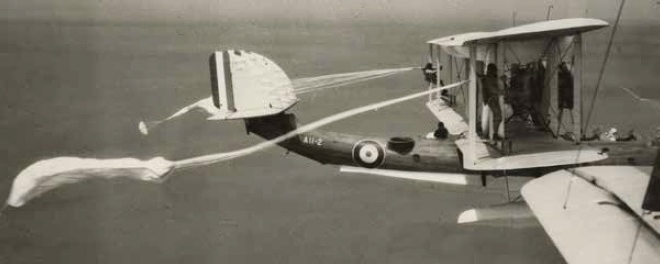
RAAF parachutists demonstrating "pull-off" from Southampton flying boat

The Southamptons (nicknamed "Swamptons") were the biggest aircraft in the RAAF's inventory at the time and a new seaplane hangar was specially constructed for them at Point Cook. On 22 June, one of the flying boats was overturned by strong wind on the Torrens River en route to meet the four Southamptons of the Royal Air Force's Far East Flight near Adelaide. In their naval cooperation role, the Southamptons were required to locate and shadow "enemy" cruisers on exercises. They also trialled radio communications between aircraft and naval ships.

The Southamptons were used for parachute training with the "pull-off" technique, which involved standing on a small platform near the outer wing struts, opening the parachute and being dragged from the aircraft by the wind. In the early 1930s, the flying boats took part in several forestry surveys in Tasmania. From June 1935 to February 1936, a Southampton was employed to map the Darwin–Sydney section of the Empire Air Mail Scheme route; its survey work ultimately took it to New Guinea and around the Australian continent. Seaplane Squadron undertook search-and-rescue work with both the Southamptons and Supermarine Seagulls; the former were involved in the abortive search for the airliner Miss Hobart, a de Havilland DH.86 that vanished in Bass Strait on 19 October 1934. One of the Southamptons was taken out of service in 1937; the other continued flying until 1939.

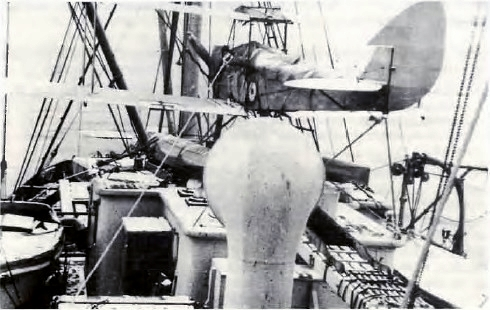
Gipsy Moth of Seaplane Squadron bound for Antarctica aboard RRS Discovery II, December 1935

In October 1929, Seaplane Squadron received a locally designed amphibian, the Wackett Widgeon II; it crashed into the sea off Point Cook on 6 January 1930, killing all three occupants. Another Wackett design, the Warrigal II landplane, was fitted with floats and assigned to Seaplane Squadron in September 1932 for trials and possible use as a trainer and patrol aircraft; it was considered successful in the latter role but maintenance issues led to its disposal in July 1933. The squadron also operated de Havilland Moths. In May 1934, one of these was flown to Darwin, Northern Territory, where it was fitted with floats and undertook reconnaissance and survey work in cooperation with HMAS Morseby, before being converted back to a landplane and returning to Point Cook in July. In December 1935, a Gipsy Moth fitted with skis embarked for Antarctica aboard the RRS Discovery II to locate missing explorer Lincoln Ellsworth. Seaplane Squadron began operating Avro Ansons for navigation courses and cross-country exercises in 1937; one exercise in November 1938 involved a round-Australia flight. A new headquarters building for the squadron was constructed at Point Cook in the late 1930s, as part of general improvements to RAAF facilities owing to the threat of war in Europe.

Throughout their existence, Seaplane and Fighter Squadrons remained under the control of No. 1 FTS and were "really little more than flights", in the words of the official history. The final entry in Seaplane Squadron records was made on 30 June 1939. The unit became the nucleus for No. 10 (Reconnaissance) Squadron, formed at Point Cook the following day.
