= 1937 Australian referendum (aviation) =

1937 Australian Aviation referendum
- 6 March 1937
- Do you approve of the proposed law for the alteration of the Constitution entitled — "Constitution Alteration (Aviation) 1936" ?
- Voting system: A simple majority of voters nationwide.; A majority in 4 out of the 6 states.
- Outcome: Proposal rejected due to gaining a majority in only 2 of the 6 states.
Majority in each state.
Yes: Queensland; Victoria	No: New South Wales; South Australia; Tasmania; Western Australia

The Constitution Alteration (Aviation) Bill 1936, was an unsuccessful proposal to alter the Australian Constitution to extend the Commonwealth legislative power in respect to air navigation and aircraft. It was put to voters for approval in a referendum held on 6 March 1937.

== Question ==
Do you approve of the proposed law for the alteration of the Constitution entitled 'Constitution Alteration (Aviation) 1936'?

== Proposed Changes to the Constitution ==
The proposal was to alter section 51 of the Constitution by adding

(vi.A.) Air navigation and aircraft.

== Background ==
Aviation was a subject that did not exist when the Constitution was drafted at the end of the 19th century. In 1919, Australia had entered into the Convention Relating to the Regulation of Aerial Navigation, and parliament enacted the Aircraft Navigation Act 1920, which authorised the Governor-General to make regulations to give effect to the Convention. Daredevil pilot Goya Henry was convicted of flying without a licence, having flown around, over and under the Sydney Harbour Bridge. The Commonwealth relied upon three sources of constitutional power, interstate trade and commerce, foreign affairs and territories. The High Court held in R v Burgess; Ex parte Henry that the parliament has no general control over the subject matter of civil aviation and that implementation of the convention did not require the Commonwealth to control civil aviation. The court rejected an argument that the interstate trade and commerce power extended to activities that were commingled with interstate activities. The regulations were invalid as they went further than was necessary to carry out and give effect to the convention. The regulations were amended so they implemented the convention for aviation within a state.

A 22 page booklet was prepared setting out the arguments in favour of the proposal and those against that were endorsed by a majority of members of parliament who voted for and against the proposal.

=== Yes case ===
The argument in favor of the amendments was prepared by the Attorney-General Robert Menzies. The Sun summarised the yes case as follows:

The object is to amend the Constitution to confer upon the Commonwealth Parliament the power to make laws regarding air navigation and aircraft— to enable what is obviously a national problem to be dealt with by the National Parliament.

Under existing powers the Commonwealth may control interstate but not intra-State aerial transport.

It is ludicrous that an instrument of transport so flexible and so incapable of being kept within narrow geographical limits should still be subject in many ways to six different sets of State laws, also the Commonwealth laws.

The view that an aeroplane competes with State railways, and therefore should be under State control, in the interests of transport co-ordination, becomes less tenable each year.

The real question is whether the people desire divided or uniform control.

=== No case ===
The case in opposition to the aviation referendum was prepared by New South Wales Labor members and some other members who opposed the Referendum Bill. The Sun summarised the no case as follows:

In 1934. Mr. Menzies. as Acting Premier of Victoria, opposed a proposal similar to that he is now putting to the people.

The Lyons Government plans to hand over air transport to the Imperial Airways Trust. A "Yes" vote will mean dearer freights and fares for the people of every State.

The present proposal is designed to make the Imperial Air Trust, with privately subscribed capital, a serious rival of the State railway services. This same Imperial Air Trust has already begun a sinister influence in the political life of Australia.

A "Yes" vote will wreck State railway systems, in which the electors have £311,486,688 invested, and in which 79,145 are employed. A "Yes" vote would bankrupt country towns, mean dearer freights, and dearer food, and would pave the way for an Imperial Air Trust.

The Lyons Government has no case for a referendum, and since the Goya Henry case has introduced new regulations, which are working satisfactorily.

== Results ==
Result (Note: Handbook of the 44th Parliament (2014) "Part 5 - Referendums and Plebiscites - Referendum results". Parliamentary Library of Australia.)
State	Electoral roll	Ballots issued	For		Against		Informal
State	Electoral roll	Ballots issued	Vote	%	Vote	%	Informal
New South Wales	1,550,947	1,461,860	664,589	47.25	741,821	52.75	55,450
Victoria	1,128,492	1,074,278	675,481	65.10	362,112	34.90	36,685
Queensland	562,240	519,933	310,352	61.87	191,251	38.13	18,330
South Australia	358,069	341,444	128,582	40.13	191,831	59.87	21,031
Western Australia	247,536	221,832	100,326	47.58	110,529	52.42	10,977
Tasmania	133,444	125,016	45,616	38.94	71,518	61.06	7,882
Total for Commonwealth	3,980,728	3,744,363	1,924,946	53.56	1,669,062	46.44	150,355
Results	Obtained majority in two states and an overall majority of 255,884 votes. Not carried						

== Discussion ==
For a referendum to approve an amendment of the constitution, it must ordinarily achieve a double majority: approved by a majority of states (i.e., four of the six states) as well as a majority of those voting nationwide. This was the first of five referendums (as of October 2021) to achieve an overall majority, but fail the requirement of a majority of states.

The uniform regulation of air navigation was achieved by uniform state laws which applied the Commonwealth regulations, and the High Court subsequently upheld the validity of those regulations.

== See also ==
- Politics of Australia
- History of Australia
- Aviation in Australia
