= Fighter Squadron RAAF =

Royal Australian Air Force squadron

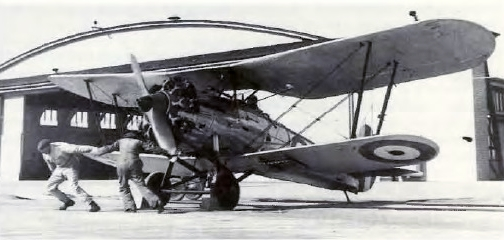
- Ground crew starting the engine of a Bristol Bulldog at Point Cook
- Active: 1930–1935
- Country: Australia
- Branch: Royal Australian Air Force
- Role: Fighter training/aerobatics
- Part of: No. 1 Flying Training School
- Headquarters: RAAF Point Cook

Aircraft flown
- Fighter: Bristol Bulldog

Fighter Squadron was a flying unit of the Royal Australian Air Force (RAAF) in the early 1930s. It operated Bristol Bulldog single-seat fighters. Along with Seaplane Squadron, Fighter Squadron was a component of No. 1 Flying Training School, based at RAAF Point Cook, Victoria. As well as participating in training exercises, Fighter Squadron was frequently employed for aerobatic displays and flag-waving duties.

== History ==
Although the first entry in Fighter Squadron records is dated 12 February 1934, the official history of the Royal Australian Air Force (RAAF) between the wars refers to the unit as having been established for the specific purpose of operating Australia's eight Bristol Bulldog fighters, which began entering service in May 1930. Fighter Squadron was one of two formations raised at RAAF Point Cook, Victoria, under the auspices of No. 1 Flying Training School (No. 1 FTS), the other being Seaplane Squadron, which operated Supermarine Southamptons among other types. No. 1 FTS had been the first unit to be formed as part of the new Australian Air Force on 31 March 1921 (the prefix "Royal" was added in August that year). The single-seat Bulldogs were procured to give the RAAF a dedicated air defence capability following the retirement of the Royal Aircraft Factory S.E.5 fighter in 1928. Although only a "token" combat force according to the official history, the Bulldogs represented the latest technology available and gave Fighter Squadron the aura of an elite formation.

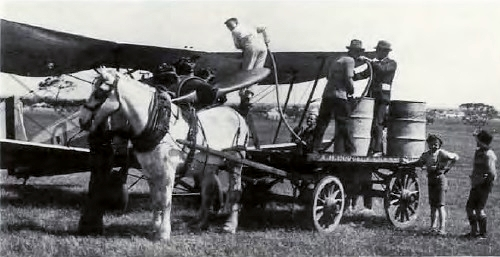
Flight Lieutenant Scherger refuels his Bulldog at Nhill, Victoria, on his way to compete in an aerial derby in Adelaide, October 1931

On 15 May 1930, barely two weeks after delivery, one of the Bulldogs crashed due to structural failure while performing an inverted loop; the pilot parachuted to safety, the first time an RAAF member had done so in an emergency. In September 1931, Fighter Squadron began flight testing the prototype Wackett Warrigal general-purpose biplane; testing was still under way when the aircraft's undercarriage collapsed during landing, putting off its service trials until the following January.

As well as participating in training exercises, Fighter Squadron was often employed for aerobatic displays and flag-waving duties. The young Air Force was keen to show off its skills and equipment to the public, leading to regular participation in aerial pageants and races as far afield as Western Australia and Tasmania; this had the added benefit of providing exposure to a variety of conditions on long-distance flights, as pilots were required to fly their aircraft to and from displays in remote areas. The commanding officer of Fighter Squadron, Squadron Leader Johnny Summers, considered that it gave personnel "most useful experience in the handling and maintenance of their aircraft under adverse conditions". One of No. 1 FTS's leading instructors during the early 1930s, Flight Lieutenant Frederick Scherger, was also a flight commander in Fighter Squadron. In October 1931, during a flight to Adelaide to take part in an aero club pageant, Scherger had to land at Nhill, Victoria, in strong winds; his Bulldog finished up on its nose but the damage was slight, allowing him to complete the journey and win his air race with a top speed of 160 mph (260 km/h).

Fighter Squadron's public displays often involved mock dogfights and simulated dive bombing, sometimes at night. On 12 February 1934, Summers, Scherger and another pilot demonstrated night-time combat tactics over the Exhibition Ground in Melbourne, the sky being lit with searchlights. In October and November that year, the Bulldogs took part in several aerial displays in Victoria to commemorate the visit of Prince Henry, Duke of Gloucester. The following month, Fighter Squadron aircraft escorted the Duke on his visit to Brisbane aboard HMAS Australia. The Bulldogs were also occasionally detailed for meteorological and photographic survey work. Throughout their existence, Fighter and Seaplane Squadrons remained under the control of No. 1 FTS and were "really little more than flights", in the words of the official history. Fighter Squadron was dissolved in December 1935 when its six surviving Bulldogs were re-designated as fighter-bombers and transferred from Point Cook to nearby RAAF Laverton, where they joined the Hawker Demons of No. 1 Squadron. During its service with Fighter Squadron, the Bulldog had been the only single-seat fighter in the RAAF's inventory, and no specialist fighter type took its place for the remainder of the decade.
