= Section 51(xxx) of the Constitution of Australia =

Section 51(xxx) of the Constitution of Australia grants the Commonwealth the power to make laws with respect to "the relations of the Commonwealth with the islands of the Pacific".

== History ==
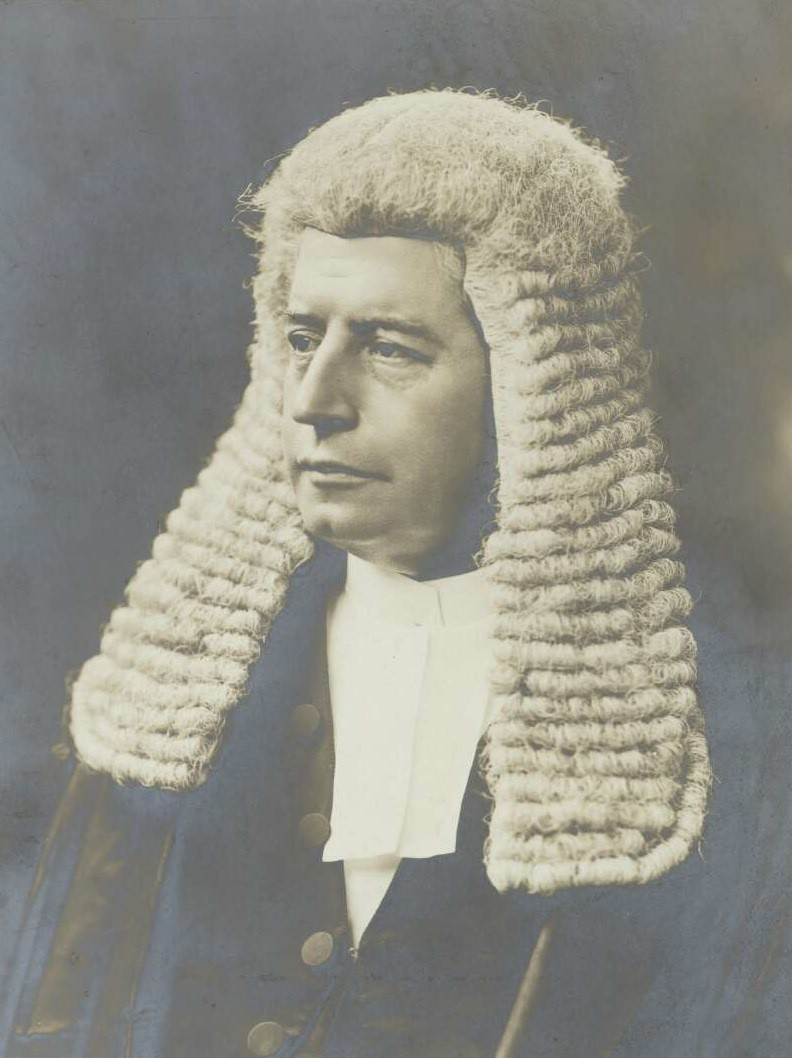
Edmund Barton, who would become Australia's first Prime Minister, spoke on the necessity of the power

At the time of drafting, there were concerns that the power was not necessary, as the external affairs power, contained in section 51(xxix) was broad enough that it already contained this power. In his speech, Edmund Barton summarised the situation as follows:

It has been suggested that this sub-section is embraced in the preceding one-"External affairs and treaties." That is arguable; it is quite possible that it may be true; but there are a very large number of people who look forward with interest to the Commonwealth undertaking, as far as it can as part of the British Empire, the regulation of the Pacific Islands... as there is a doubt as to whether the one thing is included in the other, and as there are a large number of people who are interested in this question... it is better in deference to their views to leave the words as they are.

It was later suggested that the external affairs power and the power to regulate the relations of the Commonwealth and the Pacific islands be combined, for example "external affairs, including the relations of the Commonwealth with the islands of the Pacific", although this was not eventually followed up.

== Application ==
Because of the wide scope of the external affairs power, section 51(xxx) has remained largely unused, though it was considered in Ruhani v Director of Police (a case which dealt with the High Court of Australia's ability to hear appeals from the Supreme Court of Nauru) and was held obiter as being "conferred for reasons entirely unrelated to judicial power". (Note: Ruhani, par. 298, and explained in fn. 249 as including "a vulnerability to other nations seeking to establish Pacific empires and the acquisition, use, residence and repatriation of Pacific island labour.")
