= Goya Henry =

Australian aviator, seaman and snake-catcher

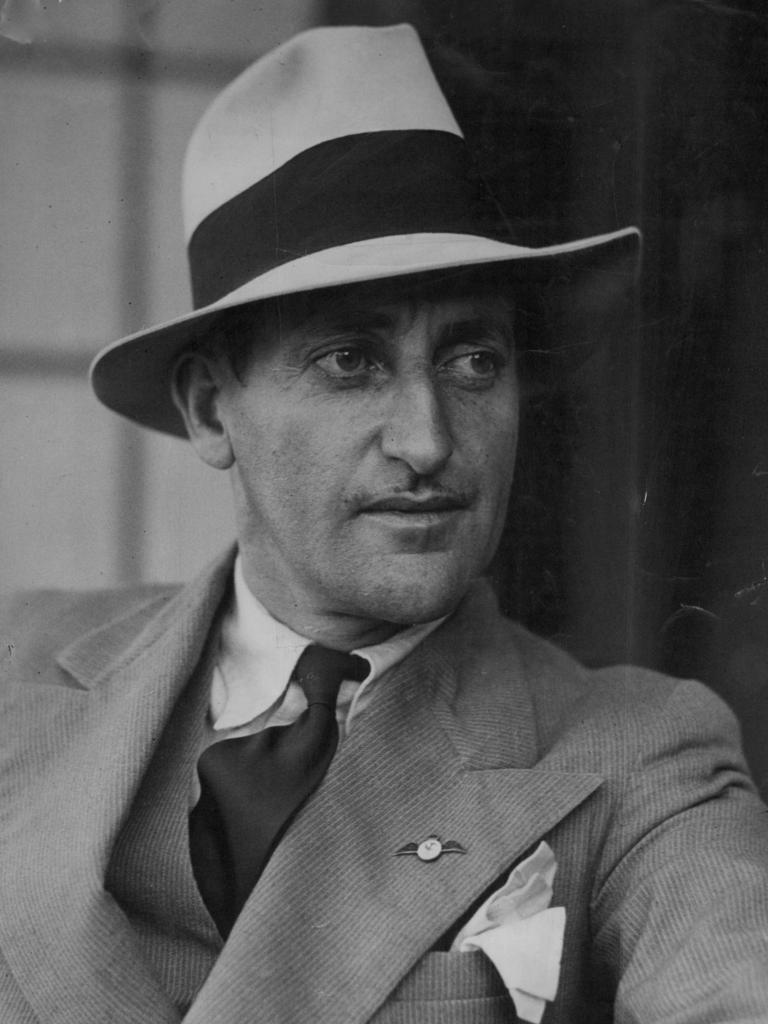
- Born: Henry Goya Henry; 17 June 1901; Grafton, New South Wales, Australia
- Died: 14 July 1974 (aged 73); Manly, New South Wales, Australia
- Education: Grafton High School; University of Sydney
- Occupation: Aviator
- Relatives: Alfred Henry (brother); Ernest Henry (brother)

Henry Goya Henry (17 June 1901 – 14 July 1974) was an Australian aviator, seaman and snake-catcher. He was reputedly the first pilot to fly a plane under the Sydney Harbour Bridge, despite having earlier lost a leg in a plane crash. Prosecution by aviation authorities led him to sue the federal government, with the High Court ruling in his favour and declaring aviation regulations unconstitutional. His aviation career ended when he was declared bankrupt in 1938. He later moved to the Territory of Papua and New Guinea where he worked as a sea captain around coastal New Guinea.

== Early life ==
Henry was born on 17 June 1901 in Grafton, New South Wales. He was the son of Emily (née Stephen) and Thomas James Henry; his mother was related to the Stephen legal family. He attended Grafton High School and went on to study science at the University of Sydney from 1922 to 1923. He initially intended to pursue a medical career but discontinued his studies and found work as a clerk. He and his brothers were known for their swimming prowess, with Ernest an Olympic silver medalist.

== Aviation ==
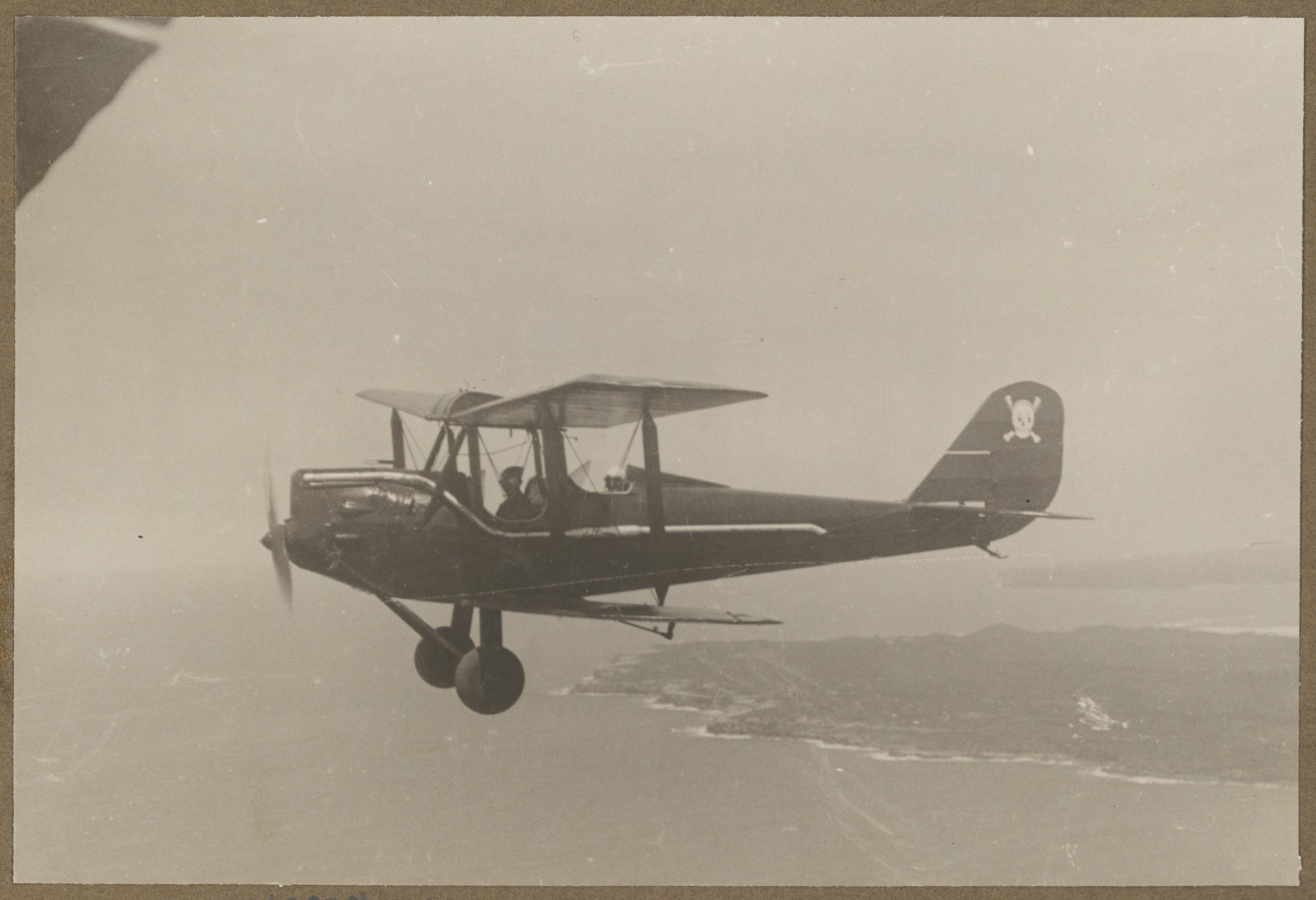
Henry's Genairco Biplane, VH-UOG, with Jolly Rogerinsignia on the tail

Henry obtained his pilot's licence in January 1928 and was issued a commercial licence in June 1929.

=== Fatal crash ===
On 5 July 1930, Henry crashed while piloting a Junkers A50 from Sydney to Brisbane with his friend Arthur Lumb as a passenger. He turned back after encountering bad weather at Broken Bay, but was unable to return to Sydney Airport due to poor visibility and sought to make an emergency landing. An attempt at Manly Golf Club was aborted due to flooding. While circling over the North Harbour the plane's engine lost power over Fairlight and nosedived into the ground "with such force that the engine was buried in the ground and the front of the fuselage crumpled like a concertina".

Lumb was killed in the crash, while Henry suffered severe injuries to his head, chest and legs. His left leg was later amputated 15 centimetres (5.9 in) below the knee. Henry's parents witnessed the crash, which occurred only around 200 metres (660 ft) from their home, although they were unaware it was their son's aircraft.

After receiving an artificial leg, Henry regained his commercial pilot's licence in 1932 and worked for Air Taxi Ltd for a period flying charter flights. In 1934 he purchased a Genairco Biplane, VH-UOG, which he used for joy-rides. His plane was acquired by the Powerhouse Museum in Sydney in 2007, and was reportedly one of only three surviving Genaircos.

=== Legal troubles ===
In September 1934, Henry's pilot's licence was suspended for two weeks for breaching federal air navigation regulations. He continued to fly and consequently had his licence suspended indefinitely. He retained his solicitor brother Alfred Henry as legal counsel and launched action in the High Court in October 1934. He continued to fly without authorisation and notably became the first person to fly a plane under the Sydney Harbour Bridge.

The High Court ruled in Henry's favour in 1936 in the case of R v Burgess; Ex parte Henry, holding that the federal government did not have the power to regulate intrastate civil aviation under the constitution. As a result, the Lyons government held a constitutional referendum in 1937 to extend the government's powers. A majority of voters were in favour of the proposed amendment, but it was defeated after failing the secure the double majority of states and voters required by the constitution.

In 1938, Henry was successfully sued in the District Court of New South Wales for damages from a collision at Sydney Airport. The case bankrupted him and effectively ended his aviation career, with his bankruptcy not discharged until 1940.

== Snakecatching ==
During his aviation career, Henry had a side venture as a snake catcher, supplying snakes to warehouses in Sydney for vermin control and venomous snakes to laboratories for anti-venom research. He would use flights to country areas as an opportunity to collect snakes, with the Macquarie Marshes a major source of specimens. His method was to "land in snake-infested country, trap snakes with a forked stick, and put them into snake bags", which he carried in the cockpit. On one occasion a snake escaped while mid-flight, a problem which he claimed to have solved by taking the plane to a higher altitude to render the snake unconscious.

In January 1940, Henry was hospitalised after being bitten three times on the hand by a black snake at Mount Kuring-gai.

== Seafaring and later life ==
Henry attempted to enlist in the Royal Australian Air Force during World War II but was denied due to his artificial leg. He instead joined the US Army Small Ships Section in 1943, sailing a small boat around New Guinea.

After the war's end Henry worked for the Department of Supply & Shipping, including as chief mate on the vessel Kelanoa sailing between Rabaul and Kavieng and as master of Matoko from 1950 to 1951. The shipping service was subsequently taken over by the administration of the Territory of Papua and New Guinea and Henry became master of Thetis, running a service on the Sepik River.

Henry retired to Sydney in the early 1960s and died of arteriosclerosis on 14 July 1974 in Manly.
