= Tugan Aircraft =

- Industry: Aerospace
- Founded: 1933
- Founder: Leo Turl, Frank Gannon
- Defunct: 1936
- Fate: Acquired
- Successor: Commonwealth Aircraft Corporation
- Headquarters: Mascot, New South Wales, Australia
- Products: Aircraft

Tugan Aircraft Ltd. was an Australian aircraft manufacturer of the 1930s. It was based at Mascot aerodrome, now Sydney Airport. It is best known for having manufactured the Gannet, the first Australian-designed aircraft to enter series production.

== History ==
The company was formed in 1933 by Leo Turl and Frank Gannon as Turl & Gannon. Both were former employees of The General Aircraft Company Genairco, which had gone out of business earlier that year after producing DH.60Xs and 9 of their own locally designed Genairco Biplane; they started offering aircraft maintenance services in the former Genairco hangar and quickly acquired the Royal Australian Air Force (RAAF) and Charles Kingsford Smith as customers. In order to expand the business into aircraft manufacture, Tugan Aircraft Ltd. was registered as a public company on 5 December 1933 with backing from members of the Carpenter family (owners of W. R. Carpenter & Co. Airlines in Papua New Guinea, later known as Mandated Airlines). The first aircraft manufactured was actually a Genairco Biplane, this was built using the wreckage of the third Genairco to be produced and was substantially modified, featuring an enclosed cabin and a de Havilland Gipsy III engine.

Charles Kingsford Smith approached the company to develop an improved version of the Codock twin-engine aircraft that Lawrence Wackett had designed and built for him while working for the Cockatoo Island Docks & Engineering Company. Tugan Aircraft in turn approached Wackett, who at the time was working for New England Airways; on 14 March 1934 Wackett agreed to act as a consultant to Tugan to design the new type. The name Gannet was suggested for the new aircraft by Kingsford Smith as a contraction of the names Gannon and Wackett.

In order to expand the product line the company entered negotiations with Miles Aircraft Limited to allow licence-production of the Hawk, but agreement could not be reached and none were built. Tugan then proposed building a type broadly similar to the Percival Gull, to be called the Tugan Aircraft Hawk. Although an advanced stage of design was reached, no manufacturing took place.

The Prime Minister of Australia Joseph Lyons announced the formation of the Commonwealth Aircraft Corporation (CAC) on 19 June 1936, and that CAC would take over Tugan Aircraft. The takeover was effected on 7 November that year and CAC continued the business of aircraft manufacture in the old Genairco hangar until November 1937, when its new factory in Melbourne was ready.

== Aircraft ==
General Aircraft Company Genairco
one aircraft built using some parts from a crashed example; substantially modified compared to original design

C3 Hawk
Four-seat single-engine design; none built

LJW7 Gannet
six-passenger twin-engine airliner; eight built

== Bibliography ==
- Meggs, Keith Raymond (2009). Australian-built Aircraft and the Industry Volume 1. Seymour, Victoria: Finger-Four Publishing. ISBN 978-1-920892-77-7.
- Cookson, Bert (1996). The Historic Civil Aircraft Register of Australia (pre War), G-AUAA to VH-UZZ. Toombul, Queensland (privately published): AustAirData.
