= Tugan Gannet =

Small twin-engined airliner built by Tugan Aircraft

LJW7 Gannet
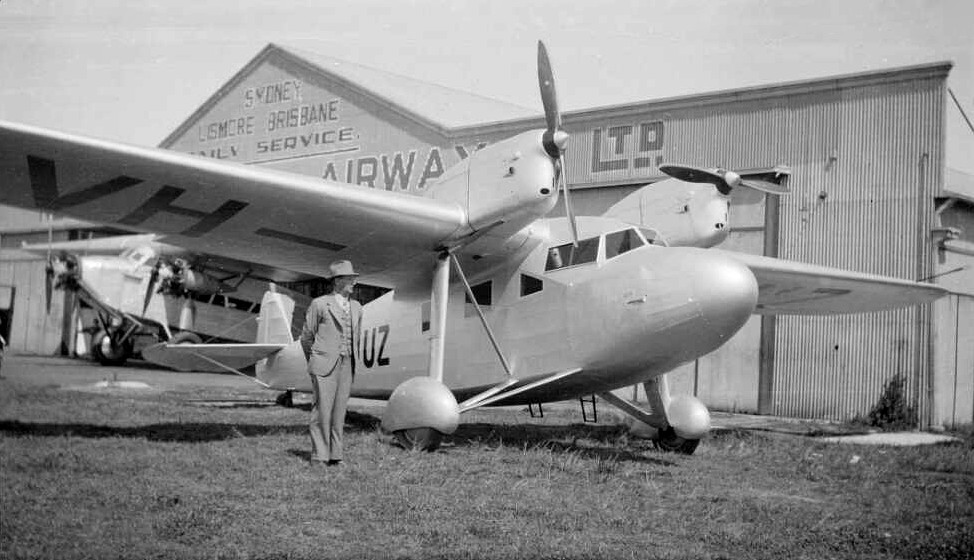

General information
- Type: Airliner
- National origin: Australia
- Manufacturer: Tugan Aircraft
- Designer: Lawrence Wackett
- Number built: 8

History
- First flight: 1935
- Developed from: Cockatoo Dockyard Codock

The Tugan LJW7 Gannet, also known later as the Wackett Gannet after its designer Lawrence Wackett, was a small twin-engined airliner built by Tugan Aircraft in Australia in the 1930s. It was the first Australian-designed aircraft to enter series production. It was also the first Australian-designed and built aircraft to be taken on strength (put into operational service) by the Royal Australian Air Force. In February 1938 Allan Walters piloted the first overseas flight in an aircraft designed and built in Australia when he flew the Chief of the Air Staff, Air Vice Marshal Richard Williams, to Singapore in a Gannet (A 14-3).

== Design and development ==
The Gannet was a strut-braced, high-wing monoplane of conventional design, with twin engines mounted in nacelles on the wings. The undercarriage was of fixed, tailwheel configuration with divided main units. The wings were of wooden construction, skinned in plywood, and the fuselage was built from welded steel covered in fabric. The prototype Gannet underwent flight testing in October 1935, and was destroyed in a crash shortly thereafter. The pilot and passengers perished in the ensuing fire, but despite this, the Gannet entered series production.

The type was operated by Butler Air Transport between Sydney and Broken Hill and at least one flew with Ansett Airways in 1943. RAAF Gannets saw service as survey aircraft between 1935 and 1942 when they were converted into air ambulances for the newly-formed No.2 Air Ambulance Unit. The last RAAF Gannets were scrapped in 1946.

== Operators ==
Australia

- Ansett Airways
- Butler Air Transport
- Royal Australian Air Force
- Western and Southern Provincial Airlines

== Specifications ==
Data from "A14 Wackett Gannet"

General characteristics

- Crew: one pilot
- Capacity: six passengers
- Length: 10.51 m (34 ft 6 in)
- Wingspan: 15.85 m (52 ft 0 in)
- Height: 3.50 m (11 ft 6 in)
- Empty weight: 1,470 kg (3,234 lb)
- Gross weight: 2,449 kg (5,388 lb)
- Powerplant: 2 × de Havilland Gipsy Six , 150 kW (200 hp) each

Performance

- Maximum speed: 240 km/h (150 mph, 130 kn)
- Range: 885 km (553 mi, 481 nmi)
- Service ceiling: 5,180 m (17,000 ft)
- Rate of climb: 4.3 m/s (850 ft/min)

== See also ==
Related lists

- List of aircraft of World War II
