= Wackett Warrigal =

RAAF Experimental Section Warrigal
- Side profile of the Warrigal II aircraft

General information
- Type: Training aircraft
- National origin: Australia
- Manufacturer: Royal Australian Air Force Experimental Section
- Designer: Lawrence Wackett
- Primary user: RAAF
- Number built: 2

History
- First flight: 4 December 1928 (Warrigal I); 7 July 1930 (Warrigal II)

The Warrigal I and II were Australian aircraft designed by Squadron Leader Lawrence James Wackett and built by the Experimental Section of the Royal Australian Air Force (RAAF) at Randwick, New South Wales, during the late 1920s. They were both single-engined, two-seat biplanes of mixed wood and metal construction. The Warrigal I was the first aircraft designed and built in Australia to an official RAAF specification.

== Development ==
The Warrigal (an Aboriginal word meaning "wild" or "untamed") I aircraft was designed to meet Air Board specification AC34 for an advanced training aircraft suitable to replace the ageing RAAF Avro 504K fleet. The aircraft was not only required to carry out flight training, but also training in aerial combat, bombing, wireless communication, aerial photography and observation. A mock-up was completed in February 1926 and construction was commenced shortly after. Wackett expected that construction would take around 6 months. However work on the Widgeon II and spare parts for RAAF No. 1 Air Depot delayed completion until mid-September 1928. A further two-month delay ensued when it was discovered that the centre of gravity was not as designed and several items of equipment needed to be relocated to obtain the correct balance.

Wackett made the first flight in the Warrigal I on 4 December 1928 at RAAF Richmond.

A series of extensive trials covering all the intended roles was carried out by No. 1 Flying Training School. These showed that performance was lower than the designer's predicted figures and, while it met many of the requirements in specification AC34, the Warrigal I had handling problems which made it unsuitable for use as a trainer. Wackett was dismissive of the final report on the trials, claiming that the results were qualitative only, lacking a "recognised or rational system of observation or measurement". He claimed that the improved Warrigal II design would resolve issues raised in the report.

The Warrigal II was designed to meet an RAAF specification for an Army co-operation aircraft to replace the aging fleet of DH.9 aircraft, and was equipped with a more powerful (and heavier) 450 hp (340 kW) Jaguar engine which resulted in a shorter nose to keep the centre of gravity in the correct range. Drawings for the Warrigal II were submitted to the Air Board in August 1929 with the explanation that all defects found in the first aircraft had been rectified and that construction was well underway. This led to questions by the Auditor-General since there was no written authority for the RAAF Experimental Section to commence construction of a second aircraft. However the situation was rectified with the correct authorisation coming from the Minister for Defence in January 1930 by which time the aircraft was almost complete. The closure of the RAAF Experimental Section at Randwick which had been recommended by the Salmond Report was delayed until 30 March 1930 so the aircraft could be completed. The Warrigal II was moved to RAAF Richmond in April 1930 for final assembly and rigging. The first flight was delayed by the requirement to re-check the design stress calculations following the crash of the Widgeon II seaplane which had also been designed by Wackett. The checks were carried out by the Director of Technical Services, Squadron Leader H.C. Harrison and were found to be satisfactory. The first flight of the Warrigal II was carried out by Flying Officer R.H. Simms on 7 July 1930. Shortly after this it suffered a hard landing at Mascot airport and required repairs to the undercarriage and wings.

== Operational history ==
The two Warrigal aircraft had short service careers, which consisted mostly of testing and evaluation trials. The Warrigal I was delivered to RAAF base Point Cook on 29 January 1929 after a seven-hour cross-country flight with stops at Golburn and Cootamundra. On 31 January the aircraft was christened by Mrs. Ettie Williams, the wife of the Chief of Air Staff Richard Williams and handed over to the Commonwealth Air Board for a series of performance, handling and operational tests. Numerous RAAF pilots were invited to test the handling of the aircraft, including Charles Eaton, who described an alarming incident when he was unable to recover from an intentional spin until the last moment possible, almost resulting in the loss of the aircraft.

In September 1929 it suffered from a heavy landing which damaged the undercarriage. Due to the lack of spare parts and the cost of repairs, the Air Board recommended that the aircraft should be written off, the Minister for Defence giving approval for this course of action in November.

The Warrigal II was delivered to No. 1 FTS on 12 September 1930 and within a month it had to be partly dismantled to repair chafing of the wires supporting the wings. Meanwhile, the Warrigal I was stripped of its engine and fittings and the airframe was disposed in a fire in November 1930. It had completed a total flying time of 40 hours and 5 minutes. Flight testing of the Warrigal II commenced in September 1931 and were completed in February 1932 when an inspection revealed that the joint between the front and rear sections of the fuselage had weakened and opened up. Repairs took 6 months but then further problems appeared with the undercarriage in September 1932 so it was decided to mount the aircraft on floats for trials as a seaplane. The results of these trials were positive and it was found that the Warrigal II was capable of handling rougher seas than the smaller Moth seaplanes. By March 1933 after a total flying time of 37 hours and 15 minutes the Warrigal II was unserviceable again and Wing Commander H.F. De La Rue (C.O. of No.1 FTS) recommended its disposal. This was approved by the Minister for Defence in July, and following the removal of the engine and instruments the Warrigal II was donated to Melbourne Technical College for use in the teaching of aircraft design.

== Variants ==
- Warrigal I – original 200 hp (150 kW) version designed as an advanced training aircraft with capacity for pilot and instructor (one produced)
- Warrigal II – improved 450 hp (340 kW) version designed as an army co-operation aircraft with capacity for pilot and observer/rear gunner (one produced)

== Operators ==
Australia

- Commonwealth Air Board
- Royal Australian Air Force

== Specifications (Warrigal I) ==
Data from Meggs 2009

General characteristics

- Crew: 1
- Capacity: 1
- Length: 25 ft 9 in (7.85 m)
- Upper wingspan: 36 ft 6.75 in (11.1443 m)
- Height: 9 ft 11.5 in (3.035 m) to tip of propeller
- Wing area: 377 sq ft (35.0 m^{2})
- Empty weight: 2,148 lb (974 kg)
- Gross weight: 3,429 lb (1,555 kg)
- Fuel capacity: 40 gallons
- Powerplant: 1 × Armstrong Siddeley Lynx seven cylinder radial air-cooled engine, 200 hp (150 kW)
- Propellers: 2-bladed wooden, 8 ft 4 in (2.54 m) diameter

Performance

- Maximum speed: 97 mph (156 km/h, 84 kn) at sea level
- Endurance: 3 hours
- Service ceiling: 9,000 ft (2,700 m)

Armament

- Guns: One fixed Vickers 0.303" machine gun firing through the propeller arc with a magazine for 600 rounds. Provision for one Scarff-ring mounted Lewis 0.303" machine gun in the rear cockpit, with 2 spare magazines (97 rounds each) in the top decking of the rear fuselage.
- Bombs: Provision for four 20-pound bombs or one 112-pound bomb for training purposes. A prone bomb sighting position was included in the rear cockpit.
