= 1937 Australian referendum =

Unsuccessful referendum on Commonwealth legislative power

The 1937 Australian referendum was held on 6 March 1937. It contained two referendum questions.

Question	NSW	Vic	Qld	SA	WA	Tas	States in favour	Voters in favour	Result
(17) Aviation	No	Yes	Yes	No	No	No	2:4	53.6%	Not carried
(18) Marketing	No	No	No	No	No	No	0:6	36.3%	Not carried

== Results ==
=== Results in detail ===
==== Aviation ====
Result
State	Electoral roll	Ballots issued	For		Against		Informal
State	Electoral roll	Ballots issued	Vote	%	Vote	%	Informal
New South Wales	1,550,947	1,461,860	664,589	47.25	741,821	52.75	55,450
Victoria	1,128,492	1,074,278	675,481	65.10	362,112	34.90	36,685
Queensland	562,240	519,933	310,352	61.87	191,251	38.13	18,330
South Australia	358,069	341,444	128,582	40.13	191,831	59.87	21,031
Western Australia	247,536	221,832	100,326	47.58	110,529	52.42	10,977
Tasmania	133,444	125,016	45,616	38.94	71,518	61.06	7,882
Total for Commonwealth	3,980,728	3,744,363	1,924,946	53.56	1,669,062	46.44	150,355
Results	Obtained majority in two states and an overall majority of 255,884 votes. Not carried						

==== Marketing ====
Result
State	Electoral roll	Ballots issued	For		Against		Informal
State	Electoral roll	Ballots issued	Vote	%	Vote	%	Informal
New South Wales	1,550,947	1,461,860	456,802	33.76	896,457	66.24	108,601
Victoria	1,128,492	1,074,278	468,337	46.58	537,021	53.42	68,920
Queensland	562,240	519,933	187,685	38.78	296,302	61.22	35,946
South Australia	358,069	341,444	65,364	20.83	248,502	79.17	27,578
Western Australia	247,536	221,832	57,023	27.77	148,308	72.23	16,501
Tasmania	133,444	125,016	24,597	21.88	87,798	78.12	12,621
Total for Commonwealth	3,980,728	3,744,363	1,259,808	36.26	2,214,388	63.74	270,167
Results	Obtained majority in no state and an overall minority of 954,580 votes. Not carried						

== See also ==
- Referendums in Australia
- Politics of Australia
- History of Australia
