= Polyukhovich v Commonwealth =

Judgement of the High Court of Australia

- Court: High Court of Australia
- Full case name: Polyukhovich v The Commonwealth of Australia and Another
- Decided: 14 August 1992
- Citations: (1991) 172 CLR 501; [1991] HCA 32.

Case history
- Prior action: Polyukhovich v Commonwealth (1991) 172 CLR 501

Court membership
- Judges sitting: Mason CJ, Brennan, Deane, Dawson, Toohey, Gaudron and McHugh JJ

Case opinions
- (6:1) Section 9 of the War Crimes Act 1945 (Cth) was valid as a law with respect to external affairs. (per Mason CJ, Deane, Dawson, Toohey, Gaudron & McHugh JJ; Brennan J dissenting) (4:2) The statute did not invalidly usurp the judicial power of the Commonwealth. (per Mason CJ, Dawson, Toohey & McHugh JJ; Deane & Gaudron JJ dissenting; Brennan J not deciding)

Polyukhovich v Commonwealth (1991) 172 CLR 501; [1991] HCA 32, commonly referred to as the War Crimes Act Case, was a significant case decided in the High Court of Australia regarding the scope of the external affairs power in section 51(xxix) of the Constitution and the judicial power of the Commonwealth.

== Background ==
The War Crimes Act 1945 provided that any person who committed a war crime between 1 September 1939 and 8 May 1945 was guilty of an indictable offence. Ivan Timofeyevich Polyukhovich had been charged under the Act with war crimes, alleged to have been committed between September 1942 and May 1943 in Ukraine while it was under German occupation in World War II.

Polyukhovich's lawyers argued that the law was beyond the scope of Commonwealth legislative power in section 51(vi) (defence) and section 51(xxix) (external affairs) of the Constitution. He further argued that the attempt to make past criminal conduct an offence was an invalid attempt to usurp the judicial power of the Commonwealth, that power being vested by the Constitution in Chapter III courts, by enacting what was effectively a bill of attainder.

== Decision ==
=== External affairs power ===
By a majority of 6 to 1 (Brennan J dissenting) the court held that the Act was a valid exercise of the external affairs power. The six majority judges all wrote separate opinions. Mason CJ, Deane, Dawson, Gaudron & McHugh JJ were all of the opinion that as the subject matter of the legislation was external to Australia then the law was a valid one under the external affairs power. Mason CJ also said that if the Parliament considered that Australia had an interest or concern it was not for the court to examine whether there was a relevant interest or concern.

Toohey J, however, considered that it was not sufficient that the Act dealt with matters outside Australia. In his opinion, the subject matter had to 'touch and concern' Australia, In the event, he found that there was a sufficient connection between the subject matter of the Act and Australia to allow the law under section 51(xxix).

In dissent, Brennan J suggested that there must be a nexus between Australia and the 'external affair' involved. He held that, because the subject of war crimes in World War II was not an external affair at the time, i.e., 1939 to 1945, the subsequent acquisition of citizenship or residence in Australia by an individual was not enough to transform the subject matter into an external affair.

=== Judicial power ===
In relation to Polyukhovich's contention that the Act purported to usurp the judicial power of the Chapter III courts, the court held by a majority of 4 to 2 (Brennan J not deciding) that the statute did not invalidly usurp the judicial power of the Commonwealth. While the majority all accepted that a bill of attainder would offend the Commonwealth separation of powers, the fact that a law operated ex post facto did not automatically make the law a bill of attainder. In addition, an ex post facto law of the kind under consideration was not a usurpation of judicial power.

== See also ==
- List of High Court of Australia cases
