= 1937 Australian referendum (marketing) =

1937 Australian referendum

1937 Australian Commercial Sales Regulation referendum
- 6 March 1937
- Do you approve of the proposed law for the alteration of the Constitution entitled — "Constitution Alteration (Marketing) 1936" ?

Results
Choice	Votes	%
Yes	1,259,808	36.26%
No	2,214,388	63.74%
Valid votes	3,474,196	92.78%
Invalid or blank votes	270,167	7.22%
Total votes	3,744,363	100.00%
Registered voters/turnout	3,980,728	94.06%

The Constitution Alteration (Marketing) Bill 1936, was an unsuccessful proposal to alter the Australian Constitution to ensure that the Commonwealth could continue legislative schemes for the marketing of agricultural produce such as the quota for dried fruits. It was put to voters for approval in a referendum held on 6 March 1937.

== Question ==
Do you approve of the proposed law for the alteration of the Constitution entitled 'Constitution Alteration (Marketing) 1936'?

== Proposed Changes to the Constitution ==
The proposal was to insert section 92a into the constitution as follows:

92a. The provisions of the last preceding section [ie section 92] shall not apply to laws with respect to marketing made by, or under the authority of, the Parliament in the exercise of any powers vested in the Parliament by this Constitution.

== Background ==
The proposal was intended to overcome the effect of the decision of the Privy Council in James v Commonwealth which the found that the Commonwealth legislation regulating the sales of dried fruit was invalid. This judgment overturned a previous High Court decision in W & A McArthur Ltd v Queensland that section 92 of the constitution applied to state legislation but not to legislation passed by the Australian parliament.

A 22-page booklet was prepared setting out the arguments in favour of the proposal and those against that were endorsed by a majority of members of parliament who voted for and against the proposal.

=== Yes case ===
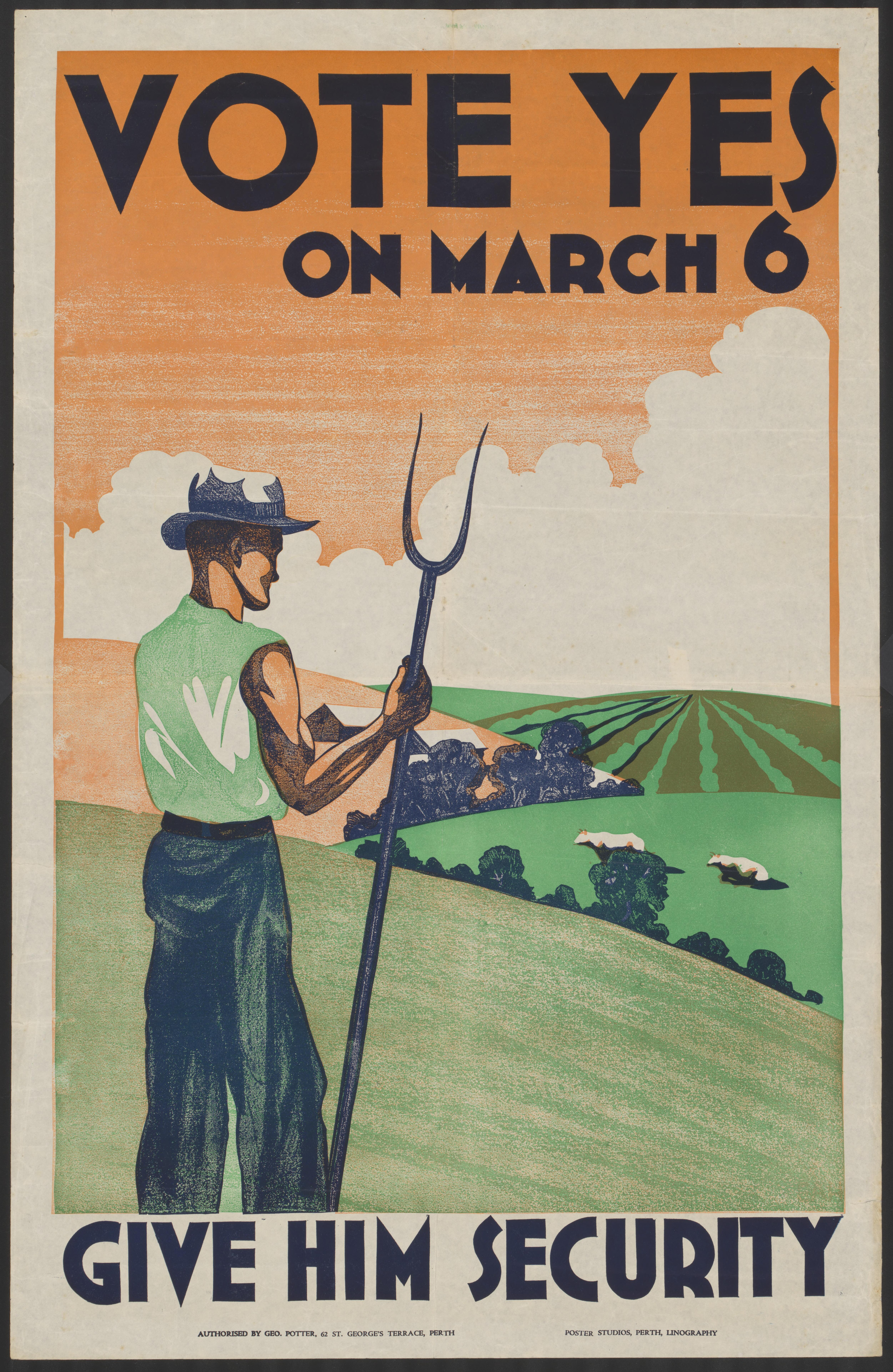
Advertising material for the "Yes" vote

The argument in favor of the amendments was prepared by the Attorney-General Robert Menzies. (Note: 45 members voted in favour of the proposal, 28 United Australia, 13 Country and 4 Labor from Queensland.) The Sun summarised the yes case as follows:

There can be no effective control of marketing of products in Australia, unless there can be control of interstate transactions in these products.

By 1928 it had been realised, as a result of legal decision, that no State Parliament was in a position to exercise effective control over Interstate trade. The Commonwealth Parliament was not bound by Section 92 of the Constitution, and the States concerned eagerly asked the Commonwealth to pass a law relating to interstate trade in dried fruits, which would be supplementary to and give effect to States' schemes of control, already in operation. The Commonwealth agreed, and the result was the Dried Fruits Act.

The Privy Council decided the Commonwealth had no power to pass an interstate trade or commerce law which interfered with the absolute freedom of that trade or commerce. The Commonwealth law became unconstitutional and the State laws were reduced to equal futility. The marketing of other primary products was affected.

The amendment is one to permit co-operation between the Commonwealth and the States in the marketing field, which is at present constitutionally impossible. There is no invasion of State rights. The

States cannot legislate for the Australian marketing of goods without the Commonwealth help, and that help cannot be given unless the amendment is carried.

=== No case ===
The case in opposition to the marketing referendum was prepared by Labor and Lang Labor who opposed the Referendum Bill. (Note: 21 members voted against the proposal, 12 Labor outside of Queensland and 9 Lang Labor.) The Sun summarised the no case as follows:

A "Yes" majority will give a few people power to tax many without their consent.

Monopolies will coerce small farmers, farm employees will get nothing, and wage-earners' wages will shrink as prices are artificially forced up.

When the Commonwealth legislated for dried fruits it did not protect the consumer, the farm employee, or the minority growers, but merely fastened together a collection of State laws.

In August, 1930, Mr. Menzies said it was ludicrous to suggest that prices of important commodities could be put up without reducing what the ordinary consumer would be able to buy week for week with his wages or salary.

We support full Commonwealth powers over marketing. We normally consume most of our own food. Reject this proposal and the way is cleared for a national and equitable solution of our marketing problems.

Under the cloak of technical and ambigious [sic] language upon the pretext of an emergency, the Government is making another attempt to whittle away self-government.

== Results ==
Result (Note: Handbook of the 44th Parliament (2014) "Part 5 - Referendums and Plebiscites - Referendum results". Parliamentary Library of Australia.)
State	Electoral roll	Ballots issued	For		Against		Informal
State	Electoral roll	Ballots issued	Vote	%	Vote	%	Informal
New South Wales	1,550,947	1,461,860	456,802	33.76	896,457	66.24	108,601
Victoria	1,128,492	1,074,278	468,337	46.58	537,021	53.42	68,920
Queensland	562,240	519,933	187,685	38.78	296,302	61.22	35,946
South Australia	358,069	341,444	65,364	20.83	248,502	79.17	27,578
Western Australia	247,536	221,832	57,023	27.77	148,308	72.23	16,501
Tasmania	133,444	125,016	24,597	21.88	87,798	78.12	12,621
Total for Commonwealth	3,980,728	3,744,363	1,259,808	36.26	2,214,388	63.74	270,167
Results	Obtained majority in no state and an overall minority of 954,580 votes. Not carried						

== Discussion ==
This was the first of 12 referendums (as of October 2023) that failed to achieve a majority in any state.

== See also ==
- Politics of Australia
- History of Australia
