= Wackett Widgeon =

RAAF Experimental Section Widgeon
- The Widgeon I (around February 1927) following modifications for amphibious operation

General information
- Type: Single-engined amphibious biplane
- National origin: Australia
- Manufacturer: Royal Australian Air Force Experimental Section
- Designer: Lawrence Wackett
- Primary user: Royal Australian Air Force
- Number built: 2

History
- First flight: 3 December 1925 (Widgeon I); 21 February 1928 (Widgeon II)

The Wackett Widgeon seaplanes were built by the Experimental Section of the Royal Australian Air Force (RAAF) at Randwick, NSW during the mid- to late-1920s. They were single-engined amphibious biplanes of wooden construction. Although only two were built, they featured in several newsworthy aviation events of the time.

== Development ==
The Widgeon was designed by Squadron Leader Lawrence James Wackett as an academic exercise in his spare time during 1923. Late in the same year the Air Board (which controlled and administered the RAAF) submitted a proposal to the Minister of Defence recommending the establishment of an Experimental Station at the Royal Australian Navy Randwick Wireless Station. Following the submission of the proposal the Minister, Mr. Eric Kendall Bowden, visited the Station for an inspection. Formal approval for the formation of the RAAF Experimental Section was given by the Minister of Defence in December, and at the same time approval was granted for the construction of a flying boat based on Wackett's design for delivery to the Civil Aviation Branch (a division of the Department of Defence Control responsible for all civil aviation).

Construction commenced at Randwick during March 1924, but proceeded slowly due to the need to overhaul much of the machinery in the workshop. The aircraft was built to craftsman standards, with all planking in Queensland maple fixed with boat-builder's copper nails and brass screws. The rear upper fuselage was installed as a detachable inverted wooden dinghy. By April 1925 construction was almost at the final assembly stage, allowing the components to be weighed. Their total weight varied by only 6.5 lbs compared to design calculations carried out 18 months prior at Victoria Barracks.

In June 1925 the Widgeon was subjected to a series of "searching tests" with satisfactory results, and the engine was run for the first time at Randwick following a delay caused by the late delivery of exhaust valves. The Widgeon was launched into Botany Bay for the first time on 7 July. At this stage the Widgeon was a seaplane, only able to take off and land on water – the removable wheels were only suitable for launching and ground handling. The Widgeon was given the registration G-AEKB (in disregard of the correct Australian registration template of G-AUxx) in honour of the supportive Minister for Defence, Eric Kendall Bowden.

The first attempt at a take-off from Botany Bay was made during the morning of 8 July, powered by a 240 hp (180 kW) Siddeley Puma engine, but further attempts were delayed until the afternoon because the water was too rough. At 3:30pm the aircraft was christened by Mrs. Wackett. There were rainstorms reported in the area and during an attempted takeoff in the afternoon, the Widgeon was observed to "swerve suddenly and hit a sandbank". A subsequent attempt ended in disaster when a heavy swell caused the aircraft to become airborne too early and stall, nosediving into the bay. The four occupants, Squadron Leader Wackett, Colonel H. Brinsmead (Controller of Civil Aviation), Sergeant Harry Becker and Sergeant T.L. "Jack" Cropp did not suffer any injuries. Upon first inspection, Col. Brinsmead suggested it would take about two weeks to repair the damage to the aircraft.

Repairs actually took much longer and modifications to improve the craft's handling were also made including a deeper step further aft, cutting away the side windscreens and new centre-section tanks faired into the airfoil instead of above the wings. Just under five months later on 3 December 1925 the Widgeon successfully completed its first flight from Botany Bay piloted by Squadron Leader Wackett, lasting ten minutes and reaching a height of about 400 ft (120 m). Following a series of trials carried out by the Civil Aviation Branch, it was agreed that the Widgeon could be tested by the RAAF to assess its suitability as a training aircraft. Prior to its handover in June 1927 another series of modifications were carried out to convert the Widgeon for amphibious operation (able to land and take off from both water and land). These included the addition of retractable landing gear, tailskid, dual controls, extra fuel tanks, an increase in dihedral from 3.5° to 4.75°, new deeper floats with less aileron interference, a wider windscreen, a gun-mount above the rear cabin entry, cabin side windows below the wing and a more powerful 300 hp (220 kW) ADC Nimbus engine.

At the same time as these modifications were being carried out work commenced on a larger and improved aircraft, the Widgeon II. Taxiing tests of the Widgeon II were commenced on 16 February 1928 at Mascot aerodrome and it flew for the first time on 21 February following a one-day delay due to engine problems. Following an extended flight from Melbourne to Darwin and back in 1928 to accompany flying boats of the RAF Far East Flight, a final series of improvements were made to the Wackett II. These included the addition of automatic wing leading edge slats, a water rudder, an exhaust manifold ring, and a metal rear-cabin structure. The forward hull beam was increased by adding blisters to extend the chines.

== Operational history ==
The Civil Aviation Branch completed tests on the Widgeon I in April 1926 and following a request from the RAAF it was converted to amphibious operation. In April 1927 the Widgeon I provided an escort to the Duke and Duchess of York as they left Sydney Harbour aboard HMS Renown. Bad weather on the return required a landing at Rose Bay where the aircraft rode out stormy weather for three days on a mooring. After this an attempt was made to take off at Rose Bay, but one wing was immersed in water and damaged. The aircraft had to be dismantled and returned to Randwick by truck.

A request was made to have the Widgeon I allotted to No. 101 Flight RAAF (the flying boat unit). The unit was carrying out a survey of the Great Barrier Reef, and it was proposed to test the Widgeon I under operational conditions. The Widgeon was instead allotted to No. 1 Flying Training School, where it would be assessed for suitability as a flying-boat training aircraft. The delivery flight from Mascot to RAAF Point Cook took 5 1/2 hours non-stop, with fuel fed from tins into the fuselage tank then pumped to the wing tank. In February 1928 the Air Board requested the use of the Widgeon II for RAAF trials with a positive response. Prior to its delivery to the RAAF, the Widgeon II flew in the Sydney Aerial Derby (with floats removed) and took third place in a field of 23 aircraft in the speed section at an average of 109 mph over a course of 42 miles. The Widgeon II arrived at Point Cook and was handed over to the RAAF on 13 April 1928 after flying from Mascot.

In May 1928 the Widgeon II flew from Melbourne to Darwin with the intention of flying to Singapore to rendezvous with the Supermarine Southampton flying boats of the Royal Air Force Far East Flight for the Australian leg of their "great flying-boat cruise". However the Widgeon II was not able to take off from Darwin on its first leg en route to Singapore due to its heavy load and the hot tropical conditions. Instead Wackett flew the Widgeon II along the coast to Broome and met the Southamptons there on 1 June 1928. The Widgeon then accompanied the RAF Southamptons all the way to Melbourne, with stops at Port Hedland, Carnarvon, Perth, Ceduna and Adelaide. The arrival of the five flying boats in Melbourne on 29 June 1928 was a major event, with the pilots of each aircraft taken to St. Kilda pier to be greeted by the Minister of Defence, the Victorian Premier and the Lord-Mayor of Melbourne, among other dignitaries. Following the reception the aircraft took off and flew to Point Cook. The Widgeon II returned to Mascot a week later for modifications and then took part in aerial races at Penrith in January 1929.

On 31 March 1929, Charles Kingsford Smith made a forced landing about 220 miles WSW of Wyndham, Western Australia, an incident that became known as the Coffee Royal Affair. A number of aircraft were requested to conduct an aerial search for the missing airman and his crew; and the Widgeon II, which had been out of commission for several months due to modifications to enable trials aboard HMAS Albatross, was prepared for the long flight from Sydney. Wackett took off from Richmond Air Base on 6 April but returned after the Widgeon II was not able to climb sufficiently.

In July and August 1929 the Widgeon II embarked on HMAS Albatross for its voyage of the New Guinea area to conduct trials under tropical conditions. After arriving back in Melbourne aboard the Albatross the aircraft was handed over to the Civil Air Board. In October No. 1 Flight Training School at Point Cook was requested to determine the suitability of the Widgeon II for seaplane training. The Widgeon I had been used intermittently for flying training, however in October the Minister for Defence recommended that the Widgeon I be struck off strength since the cost of extensive overhaul and repairs could not be justified. Around 17 February the airframe of the Widgeon I was burnt at Point Cook, after logging 99 hours of flying time.

== Accidents ==
On 6 January 1930 the Widgeon II crashed into Port Phillip Bay off Point Cook, killing all three occupants including Captain Hugh Grosvenor, who was the heir of Lord Stalbridge and had been planning a flight from Australia to England.

== Variants ==
- Widgeon I – original version with capacity for two crew and four passengers (one produced)
- Widgeon II – improved and enlarged version with capacity for two crew and six passengers (one produced)

== Operators ==
Australia

- Civil Aviation Branch of the Department of Defence
- Royal Australian Air Force No.1 Flight Training School

Several companies expressed an interest in manufacturing or operating Widgeons but none of these plans came to fruition:

- A.G. Simpson of Air Transport Ltd indicated his willingness to fund the construction of a Widgeon.Australian-built aircraft and the industry
- A company formed by Lt. Col. T.W. White expressed an interest in operating three Widgeons on routes from Townsville to Mackay; Adelaide to Port Lincoln; and Geelong to Launceston (all coastal towns); however this never eventuated.
- The Commonwealth Shipping Board placed a request with the Department of Defence for the construction of six Widgeons.Australian-built aircraft and the industry

== Specifications (Widgeon I) ==
Data from Australian-built aircraft and the industry

General characteristics

- Crew: one
- Capacity: three
- Length: 29 ft 6.75 in (9.0107 m)
- Upper wingspan: 29 ft 3.75 in (8.9345 m)
- Lower wingspan: 29 ft 3.75 in (8.9345 m)
- Height: 14 ft 0.75 in (4.29 m) to tip of propeller
- Wing area: 424.3 sq ft (39.42 m^{2})
- Empty weight: 2,900 lb (1,315 kg)
- Gross weight: 3,960 lb (1,796 kg)
- Fuel capacity: 44 gallons
- Powerplant: 1 × ADC Nimbus 6-cylinder inline water-cooled engine, 300 hp (220 kW)
- Propellers: 4-bladed wooden, 8 ft 6 in (2.59 m) diameter

Performance

- Maximum speed: 103 mph (166 km/h, 90 kn) at sea level
- Endurance: 3 hours
- Service ceiling: 11,000 ft (3,353 m)

== Bibliography ==
- Grant, James Ritchie. "Anti-Clockwise: Australia the Wrong Way". Air Enthusiast, No. 82, July–August 1999, pp. 60–63. ISSN 0143-5450
