= Genairco Biplane =

Biplane
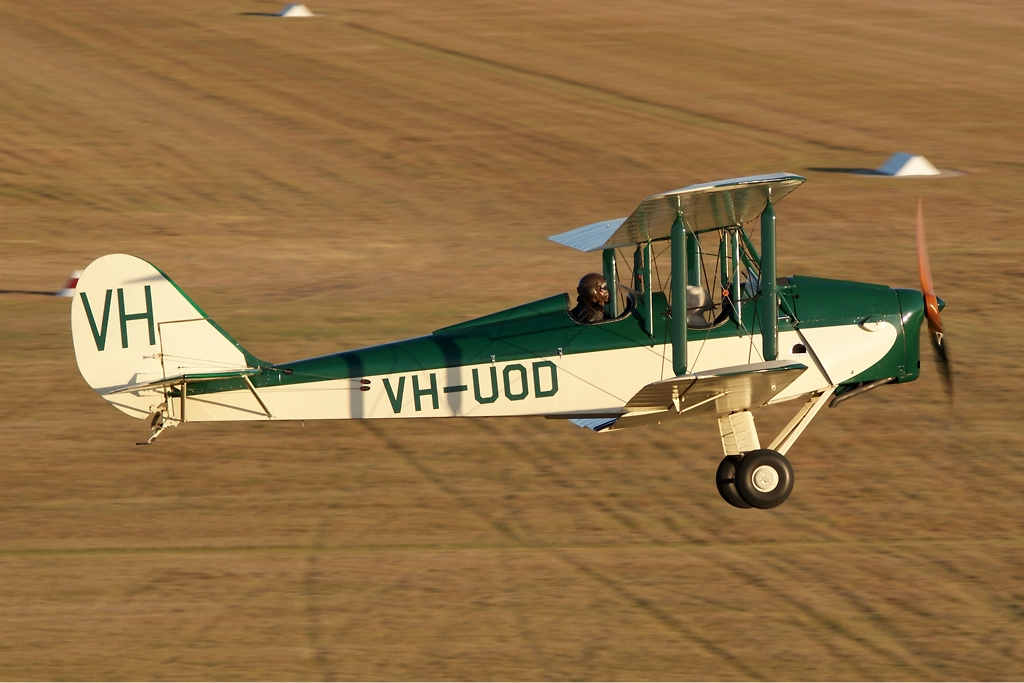
- Genairco inflight at Bundaberg Airport

General information
- Type: Utility aircraft
- National origin: Australia
- Manufacturer: Genairco
- Designer: George Beohm
- Status: Three extant
- Number built: 9

History
- First flight: 1929

The Genairco Biplane (also known as the Genairco Moth) was a utility biplane built in small numbers in Australia in the late 1920s and early 1930s.

The General Aircraft Company, (Genairco) in Australia, had been overhauling and repairing 6 DH60 Cirrus Moths for the RAAF and then building 3 local examples of the DH60X Cirrus II Moth, before they went on to design and build their own derivative "Aussie Moth" biplane.

This Genairco design was strongly influenced and based on the DH60 fuselage layout but with intended improvements including a wider fuselage able to seat 2 in the front cockpit, deeper cockpit doors and with a different wing and rudder profile. While initially called a "Genairco Moth" and now more correctly called a "Genairco Biplane", these later 9 aircraft (with 2 built as cabin bi-planes) are not variants of the DH60 Moth despite some DH production lists including them.

The Genairco series of biplanes were often referred to as "Aussie Moths", but in fact their airframe was of larger dimensions, with few similarities when closely compared with the DH.60 Moth range. Their inspiration was to provide a simple biplane which would allow two passengers to be carried - compared with the contemporary range of Moths, Avians, Widgeons and Klemms which could carry just a single passenger.

The three seater Genaircos were expected to find a market with the Australian aviators of the era who were making a living out of joyrides and barnstorming tours, who could double their payload for each flight at a minimal increase in operating cost.

The later Genairco development, the Genairco Cabin, has been dismissed as a copy of the DH.83 Fox Moth. However work on the prototype had commenced in Sydney six months before news of the new DH.83 had reached Australia in those days before air mail.

== Design and construction ==
It was a conventional single-bay biplane with fixed tailskid undercarriage, with a fuselage based on the de Havilland Moth and wings based on the Avro Avian. The fuselage, however, was wider than that of the Moth, allowing two passengers to be carried seated side-by-side in an open cockpit ahead of the pilot's. Some later examples of the type featured an enclosed cabin for the passengers, and these were known as Genairco Cabin Biplanes, with the original design retrospectively named the Genairco Open Biplane.

9 Genaircos were built by the General Aircraft Company (GAC), 8 as open cockpit biplanes, and one as an enclosed cabin biplane, with a second converted later into a cabin biplane. A number of these aircraft operated on floats.

A 10th Genairco was built as Cabin Floatplane by Tugan Aircraft who took over the GAC premises when that business collapsed during the Depression.

All but three were built with ADC Cirrus Hermes upright engines, the seventh example was fitted with the locally designed 4 water cooled upright 4 cylinder inline, the Harkness Hornet, but while its performance was satisfactory, the extra weight of the engine and its radiator offered no benefit over the air cooled ADC Cirrus.

The ninth example was fitted with a 120 hp Siemens-Halske SH12 radial engine, while the last example, built by Tugan Aircraft as a cabin floatplane, was fitted with a Gipsy III inverted engine.

Interestingly 2 survivors of the original 6 that were fitted with ADC Cirrus upright engines, are now fitted with inverted Gipsy Major engines. While the 3rd survivor, which is the 7th airframe built, was fitted with an upright DH Gipsy II engine after the Hornet was removed.

== Surviving aircraft ==
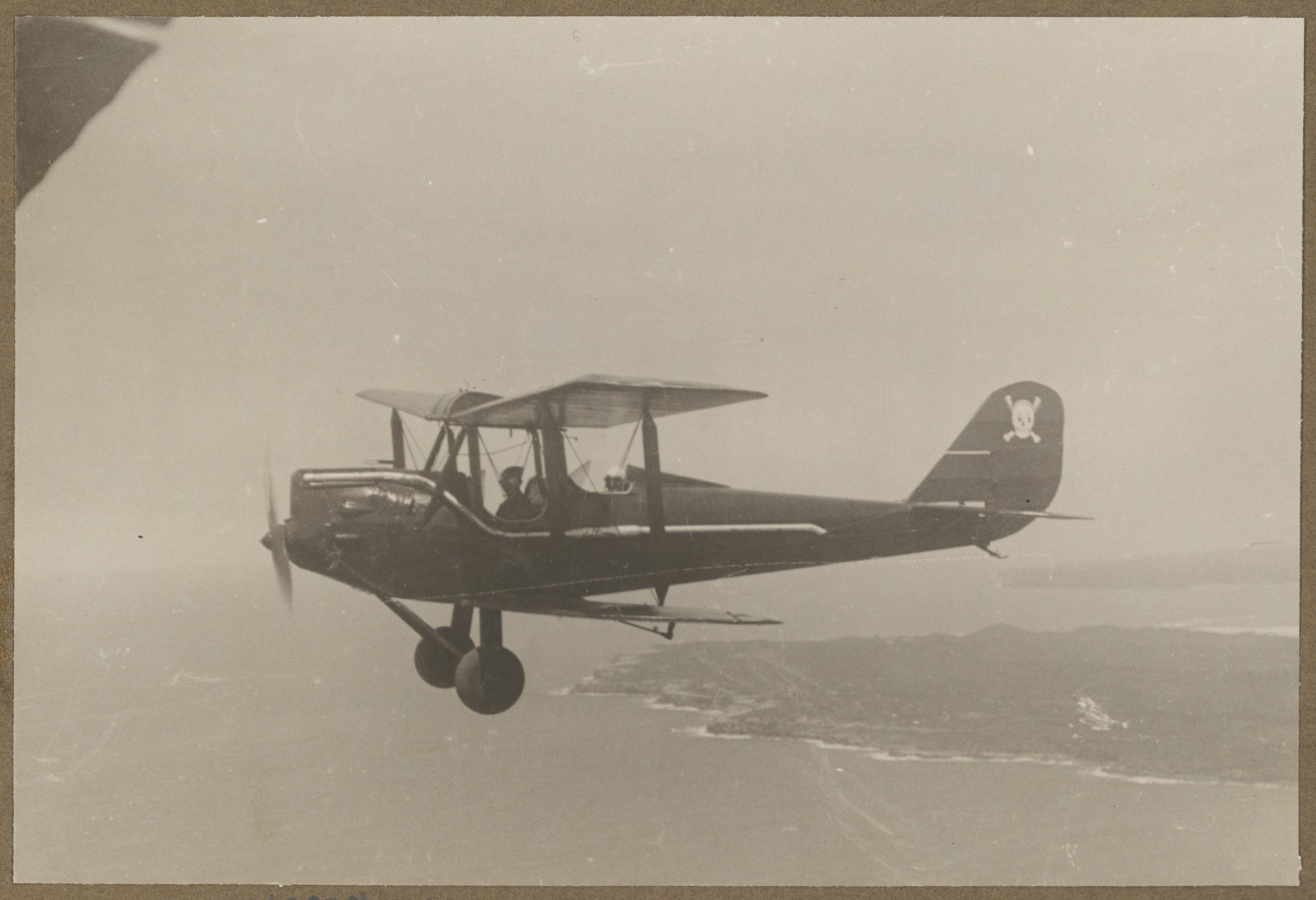
Genairco Biplane VH-UOG owned by Goya Henry with Jolly Roger insignia on the tail

Three Genairco biplanes have survived.

=== Australia ===
Airworthy

- VH-UOD, an Open Biplane, was restored and is maintained in airworthy condition.

Stored

- VH-UOG, an Open Biplane originally owned by daredevil pilot Goya Henry, is owned by the Museum of Applied Arts and Sciences, also known as the Powerhouse Museum, in Sydney, New South Wales.

=== United States ===
Stored

- N240G (previously VH-UOH and then VH-UUI), a Cabin Biplane, was exported from Australia in 1966 and is awaiting restoration by the Fantasy of Flight museum at Polk City, Florida.

== Specifications ==
Data from

General characteristics

- Crew: 1
- Capacity: 2 pax
- Wingspan: 30 ft 9 in (9.37 m)
- Height: 8 ft 10 in (2.7 m)
- Empty weight: 944 lb (428 kg)
- Gross weight: 2,100 lb (953 kg)
- Powerplant: 1 × Harkness Hornet , 115 hp (86 kW)
- Propellers: 2-bladed wooden fixed-pitch propeller

Performance

- Maximum speed: 105 mph (169 km/h, 91 kn) *Landing speed:38 mph (33 kn; 61 km/h)
- Rate of climb: 800 ft/min (4.1 m/s)
