= Lawrence Wackett =

Australian aviation pioneer

Sir Lawrence Wackett
- Born: 2 January 1896; Townsville, Queensland
- Died: 18 March 1982 (aged 86); St Leonards, New South Wales
- Relatives: Air Vice Marshal Ellis Wackett (brother)
- Military career
- Allegiance: Australia
- Branch: Australian Military Forces (1913–15); Australian Flying Corps (1915–21); Royal Australian Air Force (1921–30)
- Service years: 1913–1930
- Rank: Wing Commander
- Commands: RAAF Experimental Section (1924–30); No. 7 Squadron (1919)
- Conflicts: First World War; Sinai and Palestine Campaign; Western Front; Battle of Hamel; Second World War
- Awards: Knight Bachelor; Distinguished Flying Cross; Air Force Cross; Mentioned in Despatches

Sir Lawrence James Wackett, DFC, AFC (2 January 1896 – 18 March 1982) is widely regarded as "father of the Australian aircraft industry". He has been described as "one of the towering figures in the history of Australian aviation covering, as he did, virtually all aspects of activities: pilot, designer of airframes and engines, entrepreneur and manager". He was knighted for his services to aviation and was a winner of the Oswald Watt Gold Medal. He was also a keen angler and wrote two books on the subject.

== Early years, war service and education ==
Wackett was born in Townsville, Queensland, on 2 January 1896. He joined the Australian Military Forces in 1913, graduated from the Royal Military College, Duntroon, and then with the rank of lieutenant joined No. 1 Squadron of the Australian Flying Corps (AFC), which had formed at Point Cook the day before his 20th birthday. He was one of twelve pilots that went to Egypt with the squadron to operate in support of the Sinai and Palestine Campaign, embarking on 16 March 1916 and arriving at Suez four weeks later.

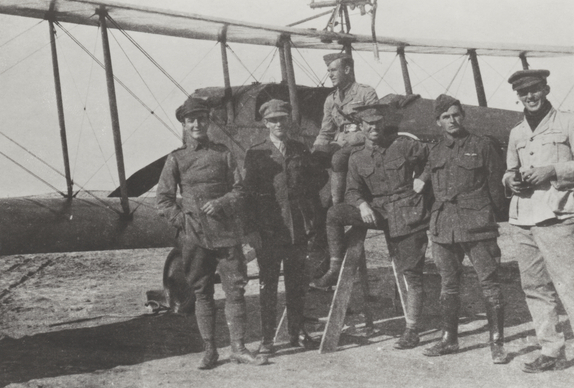
At Kantara, Egypt, circa. May 1917 (far right)

In Egypt Wackett designed a mount to attach a Lewis Gun to the upper wing of his Royal Aircraft Factory B.E.2c; considerably improving the fighting ability of a type that was described by Hudson Fysh (who served with Wackett in No. 1 Squadron) as the "poorest of all offensive, or defensive aircraft". The B.E.2c was normally armed with a machine gun at the observer's position, but the observer sat in front of the pilot and behind the engine, and between the upper and lower wings. This meant that the machine gun could only be fired in fairly narrow arcs if the observer was to avoid hitting his own aircraft. Wackett's modification meant that all he had to do was point the whole aircraft at his adversary and that he had a measure of protection when on a bombing mission (because the BE2c could carry bombs or an observer, but not both).

Wackett used his modified B.E.2c to good effect on several occasions. He once gave the enemy pause when, while on a reconnaissance mission, he was attacked by two Rumpler C.Is. Wackett flew towards them firing the gun and the Rumplers broke off the fight. On 11 November 1916 he was in his B.E.2c on a 7-hour bombing mission to Beersheba with four other B.E.2s and a Martinsyde G.100 when the formation came under attack by two much superior German aircraft. Wackett was able to use his aircraft to assist the Martinsyde in defending their comrades and fighting off the attack. On the night of the 14/15 January 1917, 16 Jewish workers (mostly masons, carpenters and plumbers) who had been working in Beersheba under the Turkish Military Authority, were sleeping in a railway carriage at Beersheba Railway Station when a RAF B.C.2c dropped a 45 kg bomb very near the carriage, killing all of them. Later investigations by British and Australian air force historians confirmed that the pilot was an Australian. Further investigation and in-depth study of British, Australian and Turkish records by researcher Ilan Gal Peer, confirmed that the most likely pilot was Wackett, who believed a non-existent ammunitions shed was located in the immediate vicinity.

Wackett later transferred to No. 3 Squadron AFC in France and played a role in the Battle of Hamel, fought on 4 July 1918. Captured German documents revealed that they had been experimenting with dropping ammunition from aircraft and No. 3 Squadron was asked to investigate doing the same. Wackett was asked to do the work as his reputation had spread; "he had a gift for mechanical inventions", according to his superiors. Now a captain, he devised a small parachute that could be used to drop supplies to troops, designed a modified bomb rack to hold the supplies and then trained No. 3 Squadron personnel in the required technique. Lieutenant General Sir John Monash's battle plan for Hamel involved resupplying the engaged machine-gunners with ammunition dropped by aircraft. In the event No. 3 Squadron was assigned other tasks during the battle and the ammunition drop was performed by No. 9 Squadron RAF. Monash later wrote, "at least 100,000 rounds of ammunition were [dropped] during the battle with obvious economy in lives and wounds. The method thus initiated became general in later months". Later that year, on 25 September, Wackett undertook a daring reconnaissance mission in No. 3 Squadron's first Bristol F.2 Fighter, when he with his rear gunner/observer Lieutenant Max Robert Shelley penetrated six miles (10 km) behind enemy lines to take aerial photographs of the German Joncourt-Villers Outreaux line, which were needed for a forthcoming attack. Two days later he carried out an ammunition resupply flight to some isolated troops using the equipment he had designed. As a result of these two actions he was awarded the Distinguished Flying Cross. By the end of the war he had been promoted to the rank of major. On 6 January 1919 he was appointed the commanding officer of No. 7 Squadron AFC based at Leighterton in England. No. 7 Squadron had acted as the training unit for No. 3 Squadron during the war and Wackett remained the in command until the squadron was disbanded in March that year, at which time he returned to Australia.

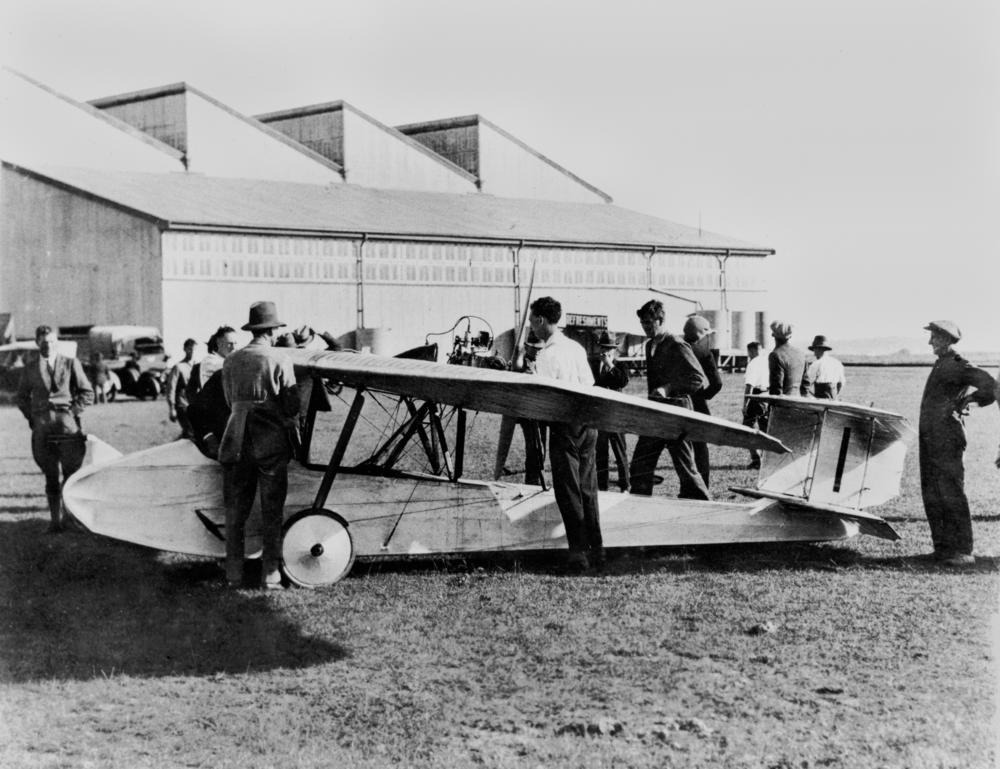
The Warbler at the Australian Aerial Derby, 1924.

Post-war, Wackett was one of just 21 officers who formed the nucleus of the new Royal Australian Air Force (RAAF) in 1921. He had a strong belief in the need to develop an Australian aircraft industry and completed a Bachelor of Science degree at the University of Melbourne, then had two years of advanced training in aircraft design under Frank Barnwell, designer of the F.2 Fighter aircraft that he had flown while serving with No. 3 Squadron AFC. He entered and won second prize in the 1924 Low-Powered Aeroplane Competition (held at Richmond in December that year) with his first design, the Warbler. This was a parasol wing monoplane powered by an engine also of his own design, the Wizard, a two-cylinder horizontally-opposed monosoupape-type pusher engine developing 25 hp (19 kW).

== RAAF Experimental Section ==
Wackett learned of war surplus machine tools slated for disposal from a workshop in Randwick, Sydney, and prevailed upon his superiors to acquire the workshop. The RAAF Experimental Aircraft Section was thus established in January 1924 and Wackett, by then a squadron leader, was placed in charge. He sought to obtain permission to design and build an entirely Australian aircraft, but the RAAF had no money in its budget for this and would not give the go-ahead unless Wackett could obtain funds from some other source. Wackett then approached the Controller of Civil Aviation, Colonel H. C. Brinsmead, and managed to persuade the Civil Aviation Branch (of the Department of Defence, there not being a separate Department of Civil Aviation at this time) to fund the construction of a small flying boat.

The result was the Widgeon, a wooden hull biplane flying boat powered by an Armstrong Siddeley Puma of 230 hp (170 kW) located below and forward of the upper wing. This aircraft, the first flying boat to be wholly designed and constructed in Australia, was registered to the Civil Aviation Branch out of the Australian sequence (i.e. G-AUxx) as G-AEKB, after E. K. Bowden, Minister for Defence. The aircraft was launched on 7 July 1925 into Botany Bay. The following day it hit a sandbank during taxi tests and later overturned whilst attempting a takeoff. Wackett was on board with Brinsmead and two mechanics; all were unhurt. The aircraft was repaired and made its first flight on 3 December that year. Wackett subsequently installed a more powerful 300 hp (220 kW) ADC Nimbus engine and an undercarriage, converting it into an amphibian. Following the modifications the Widgeon I was transferred to the RAAF and used at Point Cook for flying boat training from 1927. The aircraft operated with the RAAF until 1929, when it was scrapped. A larger amphibian, the Widgeon II, powered by a 440 hp (330 kW) Armstrong Siddeley Jaguar engine, was the next aircraft to emerge from the Experimental Section workshop. Wackett himself flew the Widgeon II extensively, later saying, "I proved its capability by flying it on a 9,000-mile (14,000 km) journey across and around part of the Australian continent in 1928". The next aircraft developed at Randwick was the two-seat Warrigal I of 1929, a biplane trainer of conventional design, powered by a 180 hp (130 kW) Armstrong Siddeley Lynx radial engine. This was followed in 1930 by the improved Warrigal II, powered by a 450 hp (340 kW) Armstrong Siddeley Jaguar radial engine.

Wackett was elected the inaugural chairman of the NSW Division of the Institution of Aeronautical Engineers (IoAE) in Sydney on 21 March 1927. The following year, after the amalgamation of the Royal Aeronautical Society (RAeS) and the IoAE parent body in Britain, he was appointed the inaugural deputy chairman of the Australasian Branch of the RAeS. He also found time to act as the New South Wales RAAF aide de camp to the Governor-General of Australia, although the duties were not onerous.

== Wackett in the 1930s ==
As a result of a government-sponsored report and pressure from British manufacturers, who saw Wackett as a threat to their monopoly on Australian orders, the Randwick Station was closed in 1931. Wackett resigned from the RAAF with the rank of wing commander and transferred (with some personnel and equipment) to the Cockatoo Island Naval Dockyard. Here, he was involved in the design of watercraft as well as aircraft. He continued working for the RAAF – a single de Havilland D.H.60G Gipsy Moth was built at the Dockyard under his supervision and entered RAAF service in 1933. He also undertook civilian aviation projects including repair and modification projects, and built the Cockatoo Docks & Engineering LJW.6 Codock, a six passenger airliner powered by two Napier Javelin engines of 160 hp (120 kW), for Sir Charles Kingsford Smith. A later design for a larger aircraft, the 4-engined Corella, did not leave the drawing board, nor did his other aircraft concepts; VH-URP, the solitary Codock, was the only Wackett aircraft design built at the Dockyard. His marine designs at the Dockyard included small motorboats such as the Cettien (which won the Griffith Cup in 1934 and 1935) and the racing hydroplane Century Tire II, and larger commercial passenger-carrying vessels as well.

In 1934, Wackett and some of his staff joined Tugan Aircraft at Mascot aerodrome. The following year, following a series of accidents involving Australian-operated de Havilland D.H.86s, he and his brother Ellis (who was then the Director of RAAF Technical Services) were asked to provide their views and recommendations to a special conference convened by the Civil Aviation Branch, held to examine the type and its shortcomings. In 1936 he was seconded to an aviation syndicate to lead a technical mission to Europe and the United States to evaluate modern aircraft types and select a type suitable to Australia's defence needs and within Australia's capabilities to build. The three-man mission lasted five months and on its return advised that the North American NA-16 was the most suitable type.

Wackett was able to acquire the rights for the NA-32 and NA-33 versions of the aircraft, plus the 600-hp Pratt & Whitney R-1340-S1H1G engine. On completion of the mission Wackett returned to Tugan Aircraft, where the Codock design was developed into the LJW7 Gannet six/seven passenger airliner powered by two de Havilland Gipsy Six engines. This was the first of Wackett's designs to enter series production. The first aircraft was delivered in late 1935 and a total of eight Gannets were built for civilian customers and the RAAF. The RAAF took delivery of one new Gannet and subsequently operated another five second-hand examples. One RAAF aircraft was temporarily modified with Menasco engines as the LJW7A during the Second World War.

Shortly after the establishment of the Commonwealth Aircraft Corporation (CAC), Tugan Aircraft was purchased to give CAC a nucleus of experienced personnel. Upon joining CAC, Wackett immediately became the general manager and oversaw the entry into production of the first aircraft mass-produced in Australia, the CAC Wirraway development of the NA-16 he had earlier recommended. The second type to emerge from CAC under Wackett's stewardship was the eponymous Wackett Trainer, the first prototype flying for the first time just after the outbreak of the Second World War.

== Commonwealth Aircraft Corporation, the Second World War and beyond ==
During the Second World War, Wackett presided over a company – that had not even existed a mere three years before the outbreak – employing thousands of people, that was now delivering hundreds of aircraft as well as engines and propellers for those aircraft. Aircraft types emerging from CAC during the war period included the innovative and advanced Woomera and CA-15, however like many of his pre-war designs these were built as prototypes only, being the victims of circumstance and changing requirements. He also suffered personal tragedy during the war when his son, Squadron Leader Wilbur Wackett, was killed in 1944 while serving as a Beaufighter pilot with No. 31 Squadron RAAF.

Following the Second World War, Wackett's influence was again exerted over the RAAF when it became necessary to replace the de Havilland Vampire first-generation jet fighters then in service. CAC initially offered the advanced CAC CA-23 design to the RAAF but this lost out to the Hawker P.1081 then in development in the UK. When the P.1081 was cancelled, Gloster Meteors were ordered in the interim, but the combat experiences of No. 77 Squadron RAAF during the Korean War showed that a more modern type was urgently needed. The anglophile government of the day wanted to wait for the Hawker Hunter to become available, but Wackett decided otherwise. He negotiated with North American Aviation and Rolls-Royce to manufacture the Sabre jet fighter and Avon engine of those companies under licence. The use of the Avon and other features such as using 30mm Aden cannon armament instead of .50in Browning machine guns necessitated a 60% redesign of the Sabre fuselage and resulted in perhaps the best variant of that aircraft. The RAAF Chief of Air Staff at the time, Air Marshal George Jones (who had known Wackett since the time both served in No. 1 Squadron AFC), was suitably impressed by the Avon-Sabre as it became known, and threw his weight behind the project and the Sabre was ordered for the RAAF.

When the time came to replace the Sabre, Wackett once again was largely responsible for deciding which aircraft was selected, albeit with less desirable results from CAC's point of view. The selection race was even more wide open than that which saw the Sabre selected, with six types in the running. The Lockheed Starfighter was considered (by almost everyone except Wackett it seems) to be the best aircraft for the RAAF; the process had got to the stage where the Starfighter had been selected and the decision was about to be made public when Wackett declared to George Jones (by this time a member of the board of directors of CAC), "I think that I should decide what aircraft the RAAF should buy!" and once more set to work to do just that. Wackett, together with some members of the RAAF, had the decision for the Starfighter overturned in favour of the Dassault Mirage and CAC staff commenced working with Dassault (in the expectation that CAC would build the Mirage under licence as it had the Sabre and P-51 Mustang fighters). However, in a serious reverse to CAC, the Government Aircraft Factories was selected to build the Mirage instead, this being a move by the government of the day to rationalise the Australian aircraft industry. Wackett and the CAC Board undertook extensive lobbying to reverse the decision but the best that could be achieved was a subcontract to build the Mirage's wings, tails and engines. The production programme was the last that Wackett oversaw; he retired in 1966 with the delivery of Mirage components in full swing.

Lawrence Wackett died on 18 March 1982. Four years after his death the company with which he was bound for so long, CAC, had ceased to exist. His name lives on – the RMIT University established the Sir Lawrence Wackett Centre for Aerospace Design Technology in 1991 at the former CAC factory.

Two portraits of Wackett are held by the National Portrait Gallery, an oil painting by William Dargie (c. 1961) and an undated pen-and-ink drawing by Louis Kahan.

== Aircraft designs ==
- LJW1 – Wackett Warbler, a parasol wing monoplane of 1924, powered by an engine also of his own design, the Wizard, a two-cylinder horizontally opposed monosoupape-type pusher engine developing 25 hp (19 kW).[9]
- LJW2 – Wackett Widgeon (I), (RAAF Experimental Section), a wooden hull biplane flying boat powered by an Armstrong Siddeley Puma of 230 hp (170 kW) located below and forward of the upper wing. This aircraft, the first flying boat to be wholly designed and constructed in Australia, was registered to the Civil Aviation Branch out of the Australian sequence (i.e. G-AUxx) as G-AEKB, after E. K. Bowden, Minister for Defence. The aircraft was launched on 7 July 1925 into Botany Bay.
- LJW3 – Wackett Widgeon II, (RAAF Experimental Section), a biplane amphibian, powered by a 440 hp (330 kW) Armstrong Siddeley Jaguar engine, was the next aircraft to emerge from the Experimental Section workshop. Wackett himself flew the Widgeon II extensively, later saying, "I proved its capability by flying it on a 9,000-mile (14,000 km) journey across and around part of the Australian continent in 1928".[10]
- LJW4 – Wackett Warrigal I of 1929, (RAAF Experimental Section), a two seat biplane trainer of conventional design, powered by a 180 hp (130 kW) Armstrong Siddeley Lynx radial engine.
- LJW5 – Wackett Warrigal II of 1930, (RAAF Experimental Section), powered by a 450 hp (340 kW) Armstrong Siddeley Jaguar radial engine.[11]
- LJW6 – Cockatoo Docks & Engineering Codock, a six passenger airliner powered by two Napier Javelin engines of 160 hp (120 kW), for Sir Charles Kingsford Smith. A later design for a larger aircraft, the 4-engined Corella, did not leave the drawing board, nor did his other aircraft concepts; VH-URP, the solitary Codock, was the only Wackett aircraft design built at the Dockyard.
- Wackett Waterhen – A 2 seat amphibian reconnaissance biplane proposed for the Royal Australian Navy in 1931.
- LJW7 – Tugan Gannet, Wackett left the Dockyards and joined Tugan Aircraft (itself an evolution of the earlier Genairco aircraft manufacturer), where the Codock design was developed into the LJW7 Gannet six/seven passenger airliner powered by two de Havilland Gipsy Six engines. This was the first of Wackett's designs to enter series production. The first aircraft was delivered in late 1935 and a total of eight Gannets were built for civilian customers and the RAAF. The RAAF took delivery of one new Gannet and subsequently operated another five second-hand examples. One RAAF aircraft was temporarily modified with Menasco engines as the LJW7A during World War II.
- "LJW8" – CAC Wackett, a two seat monoplane basic trainer with tandem enclosed cockpit, the CA-2 prototypes and CA-6 production Wackett Trainers, although not formally referred to as LJW8, are clearly acknowledged as his design, and has apparent design and structural links to the earlier LJW7 Tugan Gannet. They are his last formal design. Wackett left Tugan to join the Commonwealth Aircraft Corporation, where he led the local production of the licence built NA-16 as the CAC Wirraway. The second type to emerge from CAC under Wackett's stewardship was the eponymous Wackett Trainer, the first prototype flying for the first time just after the outbreak of World War II. The CAC Wackett trainer was the first aircraft type designed in-house by the Commonwealth Aircraft Corporation of Australia. The name was derived from its designer Lawrence Wackett. The type was designed to meet RAAF Specification 3/38 for an ab initio training aircraft. It was a tandem seat fixed tailwheel-undercarriage monoplane aircraft with a fuselage of steel tube and fabric construction and wings and tail made of wood. Despite the simplicity of the design, construction of the first of two CA-2 prototypes, begun in October 1938, was not completed until September 1939 (this was partly because CAC was still building its factory during this time period). The first prototype flew for the first time on 19 September 1939 fitted with a Gipsy Major engine. The aircraft proved to be underpowered with this engine so the second prototype was fitted with a Gipsy Six prior to its first flight in early November the same year (the first prototype was subsequently also re-engined with a Gypsy Six). Although in-flight performance was improved, the heavier engine negated any benefits to take-off performance obtained from the increased power, so the decision was made to install a Warner Scarab radial engine driving a Hamilton two-bladed propeller. The two prototypes were fitted with Scarabs in mid-1940. With two CA-2 prototypes and 200 CA-6 production examples, the type was the most numerous of Wackett's designs to be produced, (and his only design to enter mass production), and also the most successful, with 200 serving in the RAAF as elementary and wireless trainers, Following retirement and disposal at the end of the war, with 30 being sold to the Netherlands East Indies ML-KNIL, the first Australian design to serve with a foreign military service, more than 40 went into civil service after WW2 on the Australian VH- civil register and 25 were later modified into the K.S.3 Cropduster and the Yeoman Cropmaster. It is also the only Wackett design to be preserved through extent survivors.
- Lawrence Wackett played a major design role on the CA-4 Wackett Bomber, that also took his name, but by that time he was leading a design team consisting of Herb Knight, Schulz, Frewin and Fred David among others.
- Lawrence Wackett clearly played a significant technical role in the introduction and local licensed production of the NA-16 / NA-33, including its conversion to British hardware etc as the CAC Wirraway, and is likely to have also had a strong technical influence over the designs of the CA-12, CA-13, CA-19 and CA-14 Boomerang, CA-4 Wackett Bomber and later CA-11 Woomera bomber, CA-15 Fighter, the CA-28 Ceres, CA-22 and CA-25 Winjeel and CA-26 & CA-27 Avon Sabre, but these later aircraft were all products of what had become a very large corporation with an extensive design team, and Wackett by this time had moved onto the management phase of his career.

== Awards and honours ==
- 1918 Distinguished Flying Cross
- 1919 Air Force Cross
- 1954 Knight Bachelor
- 1959 Kernot Memorial Medal
- 1974 Royal Federation of Aero Clubs of Australia Oswald Watt Gold Medal.
- 1978 Royal Society of New South Wales James Cook Medal.
- Fellow of the Royal Aeronautical Society.
- 2013 Australian Aviation Hall of Fame
- 2015 Queensland Business Leaders Hall of Fame

== Bibliography ==
- My Hobby is Trout Fishing J.T. Picken & Sons, 1946.
- Studies of an Angler J.T. Picken & Sons, 1950.
- Aircraft Pioneer: an Autobiography Angus and Robertson, 1972.
