= Royal Australian Air Force Experimental Section =

- Active: 1924-1930
- Country: Australia
- Role: Research and Development
- Garrison/HQ: Randwick

The Experimental Section was an experimental aircraft design and testing section of the Royal Australian Air Force. The section was formed in January 1924 at Randwick, Sydney and produced a number of aircraft designs before closing in 1930. The Commanding Officer of the Station was Lawrence Wackett who was an early trainee pilot at Point Cook and became the leading figure in Australian aircraft design and construction.

Wackett moved his unit to Cockatoo Island in 1930 after the section at Randwick was closed.
