= Section 51(xxix) of the Constitution of Australia =

Subsection in the Australian Constitution

Section 51(xxix) of the Australian Constitution is a subsection of Section 51 of the Australian Constitution that gives the Commonwealth Parliament of Australia the right to legislate with respect to "external affairs".

In recent years, most attention has focused on the use of the power to pass legislation giving effect within Australia to its obligations under international treaties and conventions. In some cases, as with human rights or environmental protection, the activities regulated by treaty-implementing legislation have not been international in nature but rather located solely within Australia or even solely within a particular State.

In Australia, developments in international law have no direct effect for domestic purposes unless a deliberate law-making act by the proper law-making authority has "transformed" the international rule into a domestic rule.

== Origins ==
According to Constitutional law academic Michael Coper, it is "not entirely clear what the founding fathers intended" by conferring upon the Commonwealth Parliament the right to legislate with respect to "external affairs". Section 51(xxix) was amended a number of times in the Constitutional Conventions that debated the draft Constitution in the 1890s. The draft Constitution adopted by the 1891 Sydney Convention allowed the Parliament to make laws with respect to "External affairs and Treaties". This wording carried through the 1897 Adelaide Convention but the New South Wales Legislative Council, when considering whether to ratify the draft, resolved to omit the words "and Treaties" on the basis that only the Imperial Parliament ought to enter treaties that bound Australia. The removal of the explicit reference to treaties was confirmed by the delegates to the 1897 Sydney Convention and the 1898 Melbourne Convention.

In 1901, Robert Garran and John Quick suggested that the external affairs power would "prove to be a great constitutional battle-ground." Some 86 years later, Coper remarked that their prediction "showed remarkable foresight".

== External affairs ==
=== Relations with other countries ===
The term "external affairs" was used in section 51(xxix) rather than "foreign affairs" to make it clear that relations with the United Kingdom and other parts of the British Empire were intended to be included. When the Australian Constitution was created in 1901, the United Kingdom and its possessions were not conceived of as "foreign" to Australia.

Chief Justice Latham said in R v Sharkey (1949) that "external affairs" was not confined to the "preservation of friendly relations with other Dominions", but extended to relations with "all countries outside Australia". Justice Brennan in Koowarta v Bjelke-Petersen (1982) extended this to relations with other "international persons", especially the United Nations and its various specialised agencies.

The judges in Seas and Submerged Lands case (1975) differed as to whether the "external affairs" power entitled the Commonwealth to assert its sovereignty over Australia's territorial sea, though a majority held that it did. The underlying reason for this was that the idea of national rights with respect to the "continental shelf" had emerged since 1945 distinctly as a product of international relations and international law.

=== Matters external to Australia ===
According to Chief Justice Barwick in Seas and Submerged Lands Case, the external affairs power extends to anything "which in its nature is external to" Australia, or according to Justice Mason "to matters or things geographically situated outside Australia". These suggestions were reinforced in later cases, and finally assumed decisive importance in Polyukhovich v Commonwealth (War Crimes Act Case) (1991). In this case, all judges other than Justice Brennan held that s 51(xxix) contained a sufficient grant of power to support a law to identify and prosecute "war crimes" committed in Europe during World War II. Chief Justice Mason, and justices Deane, Dawson and McHugh held that this conclusion was sufficiently based on the fact that the geographical location in which the relevant acts were alleged to have been done was physically external to Australia.

=== Implementing treaties (international law) ===
To some extent, there has been debate over whether the ratification of an international treaty may justify the exercise of Commonwealth legislative power for the purpose of the implementation of that treaty. There is a marked difference between earlier and modern approaches to this issue. Initial approaches produced an unqualified view that Parliament could legislate to give effect to any obligation or even non-binding recommendation contained in an international treaty once ratified. It was later qualified by Stephen J that it was necessary that the treaty at the very least deals with an area of international concern. However, this test of 'international concern' was rejected by Mason J in Tasmanian Dam Case in 1983, which outlines the current approach to implementing treaties and was later confirmed by subsequent cases.

== See also ==
- Section 51(xxx) of the Constitution of Australia
