= Melbourne Steamship Co Ltd v Moorehead =

Judgement of the High Court of Australia

The Melbourne Steamship Company Limited v Moorehead
- Court: High Court of Australia
- Decided: 21 October 1912
- Citations: [1912] HCA 69, (1910) 15 CLR 333

Case history
- Prior actions: Court of Petty Sessions of Victoria, 26 April 1912.

Court membership
- Judges sitting: Griffith CJ, Barton & Isaacs JJ

Melbourne Steamship Co Ltd v Moorehead was the last of a series of cases in which members of a cartel, described as the "Coal Vend" were prosecuted under the Australian Industries Preservation Act. The majority of the High Court held that the investigation power was spent once a prosecution had commenced and that under the Act, a corporation could not be required to answer questions. While the decision was based on the wording of the specific legislation, its ongoing significance is its foundation for the requirement that the government act as a model litigant.

== Background ==
Since 1855 there have been various price fixing arrangements in the Newcastle coal fields that were effective for a period in raising prices and restricting production before waning over time. In 1872 a cartel described as the Coal Vend formed and was effective in raising the price of coal from 7 shillings to 14 shillings a ton until it ceased in 1880. In around 1900 a coal owners association was formed which engaged in price fixing but without restrictions on production, however this arrangement broke down in 1903. A new Coal Vend cartel was formed that had horizontal (coal miners) and vertical (shipping companies) dimensions. The coal miners were organised in April 1906 as the Associated Northern Collieries, which comprised virtually all of the proprietors of coal mines in Newcastle and Maitland. The shipping companies joined the Coal Vend in late September 1906, initially involving were Adelaide Steamship, Howard Smith Co, Huddart Parker & Co and McIlwraith McEacharn & Co, each of which had colliery interests. The cartel later expanded to include the Union Steam Ship Company of NZ, Melbourne Steamship Co and James Patterson & Co.

=== Australian Industries Preservation Act ===
In 1906 the second Deakin government was in power, with support from the Australian Labor Party. Prime Minister Alfred Deakin's New Protection policy was to provide tariff protection to employers in exchange for 'fair and reasonable' wages for employees. The Australian Industries Preservation Bill, introduced by Sir William Lyne in December 1905, was a part of the package of legislation drafted by the then Attorney-General, Isaac Isaacs. The reason for the Bill was explained as being to protect Australian industries from unfair competition, particularly the International Harvester Co, given the pejorative label of the "American Octopus Trust" as part of a campaign by H.V. McKay who was a Victorian manufacture of harvesters and other agricultural machinery.

While the focus in 1905 was on unfair competition from foreign companies, the debate shifted during 1906 to unfair competition within Australia, including the Coal Vend. By 1907 the parliament was concerned at price fixing within Australia in oil, coal, boot and shoe machinery, bricks, confectionery, tobacco, and proprietary articles and the Australian Industries Preservation Act was amended to give the Comptroller-General of Customs investigative powers including requiring people to answer questions.

=== Huddart Parker and Co Pty Ltd v Moorehead ===
The first action against the Coal Vend were notices issued by Moorehead, who was an officer of Customs, requiring Huddart Parker & Co and its manager William Appleton to answer questions about the alleged arrangement that:

1. Huddart Parker would only purchase or ship coal from mining companies that were members of the Coal Vend;
2. those mining companies would only use shipping companies that were members of the Coal Vend; and
3. Huddart Parker had entered into various price fixing agreements about coal and shipping.

There was a subtle difference between the allegations against the company and Appleton in that Appleton was suspected of breaching sections of the Act, which depended on the trade and commerce power, while Huddart Parker were suspected of breaching sections of the Act, which depended on the corporations power. Both Huddart Parker and Appleton were convicted of failing to answer the questions and challenged their convictions in the High Court.

The High Court upheld the validity of the inquiry provisions and of those based on the trade and commerce power, thus upholding the conviction of Appleton. The conviction of Huddart Parker however was set aside, with the majority, Griffith CJ, Barton & O'Connor JJ, holding that the provisions based on the corporations power were invalid. Their Honours were strongly influenced by the now discredited doctrine of reserved State powers, holding that the corporations power was to be construed narrowly because the trade and commerce power did not include intrastate trade and commerce such that the Parliament could not make a valid law controlling the intra-State trading operations of foreign, trading or financial corporations.

=== The High Court prosecution ===
The second action, R v Associated Northern Collieries, was a prosecution by the Attorney-General against each of the colliery members of Associated Northern Collieries and the original shipping companies, Adelaide Steamship, Howard Smith, Huddart Parker and McIlwraith McEacharn, commenced in June 1910. The prosecution occupied 76 hearing days between 13 April and 22 December 1911. The corporate and individual defendants challenged every aspect of the prosecution, including denials of membership of the Coal Vend, despite making and receiving payments. Isaacs J found that each of the defendants were engaged in a combination with intent to restrain inter-state trade and commerce in Newcastle coal to the detriment of the public.

The shipping companies and their managing directors appealed to the High Court, primarily on the basis that the Australian Industries Preservation Act required proof of intent not just to increase prices, but to cause detriment to the public. The High Court, Griffith CJ, Barton and O'Connor JJ, held in Adelaide Steamship Co Ltd v R, delivered in September 1912, that the intent of the agreement was to prevent unlimited and ruinous competition and to fix the "hewing rate" paid to miners. The public was not just the consumers of coal, but also the mining companies and the workers. Raising the price paid for coal was held to be of benefit to the public of Newcastle. The intent of members of the Coal Vend was to protect the prosperity of the Newcastle & Maitland Districts. There was no proof that the public suffered a detriment and no intent to cause such a detriment. The appeal was allowed and the prosecutions were dismissed. The Attorney-General unsuccessfully appealed to the Privy Council.

=== Melbourne Steamship inquiry and prosecution ===
Melbourne Steamship were not a defendant in the prosecution of the original shipping companies in the High Court, however the statement of claim included its role in joining the Coal Vend. In the month before the hearing of that prosecution, commencing in April 1911, Melbourne Steamship was directed to answer various questions about its involvement in the Coal Vend. Melbourne Steamship resisted answering the questions, in which the Crown Solicitor's office stated that the answers were needed for the purposes of the prosecution of the original shipping companies. Moorehead, represented by Starke, prosecuted Melbourne Steamship, represented by Mitchell KC before a Police Magistrate, charged with failing to answer the questions in the time given. On 26 April 1912 the company was convicted and fined £5 plus £10 10s costs. The judgement was stayed pending an appeal to the High Court.

== The High Court ==
In the High Court Melbourne Steamship was again represented by Mitchell KC, challenged its conviction in the High Court arguing that (1) the investigative powers could not be used in aid of the pending criminal proceedings and (2) the Australian Industries Preservation Act did not require an incorporated company to answer questions. Starke continued to represent Moorehead and argued that the investigative powers included asking questions for the purposes of pending court proceedings, but not from a party to those proceedings.

=== Investigation after prosecution commenced ===
Griffith CJ & Barton J held that Melbourne Steamship could not be asked questions about pending prosecutions. Griffith CJ held the evident purpose of the section was in relation to the commission of an alleged offence and that once a prosecution for that offence has commenced, the investigation power has been spent. Barton J accepted that questions might have been asked for the purpose of prosecuting Melbourne Steamship, however the evidence as to the purpose of the investigation did not support that approach. Isaacs J agreed that once a prosecution had been commenced the investigation power in relation to a defendant had been exhausted. Isaacs J dissented on the basis that the motive of the Executive was irrelevant and that as Customs had the right to ask questions of a person who had not yet been charged, the request was lawful.

=== Answers by a corporation ===
Griffith CJ noted that definition of "answer questions" in the Act was to the best of the person's knowledge, information and belief and held that a corporation could not give evidence in that regard. Barton J similarly held that the investigation power was for the purpose of obtaining evidence and a corporation could not be a witness. Isaacs J noted that the section applied to a corporation unless there was a contrary intention and disagreed that the section demonstrated a contrary intention.

=== Obligations of the Crown ===
Griffith CJ stated that one of the arguments put by the government was a technical point of pleading and that it was axiomatic that the government never take a technical point, stating

I am sometimes inclined to think that in some parts – not all – of the Commonwealth, the old-fashioned traditional, and almost instinctive, standard of fair play to be observed by the Crown in dealing with subjects, which I learned a very long time ago to regard as elementary, is either not known or thought out of date. I should be glad to think that I am mistaken.

== Aftermath ==
The Coal Vend was the only cartel prosecuted under the Australian Industries Preservation Act. There was little interest or impact in promoting competitive markets until the late 1960s. The members of the Coal Vend had successfully resisted each of the prosecutions against them. Its role in raising prices and restricting production was challenged by a drop in the demand for coal such that it collapsed as a cartel by 1912. The Coal Vend continued to exist through to at least 1929, with the Campbell Royal Commission in 1919 finding that it had ceased to operate outside the law, and the Davidson Royal Commission in 1929 confirmed the continued existence of the Coal Vend, although again there was no suggestion of it operating illegally.

=== The referendums ===
The Attorney-General, Billy Hughes, had held a referendum in 1911 to amend section 51 of the Constitution to give the Australian Parliament power to make laws about "Combinations and monopolies in relation to the production, manufacture, or supply of goods or services", however this was widely rejected, obtaining support from just 39% of the voters and a majority in just one state, Western Australia.

In 1913 the Attorney-General tried again, arguing that the changes were said to be necessary because the Commonwealth's powers had been cut down by successive decision of the High Court in applying the inter-governmental immunities and reserved state powers doctrines until they were said to be futile. Huddart Parker v Moorehead and Melbourne Steamship v Moorhead were among the cases referred to by the Attorney-General. This time the proposals were divided into six different questions, with each question addressing a different power. While it was proposed that the Australian Parliament would have power with respect to "trusts, combinations, and monopolies" it is not apparent how the proposed change would have affected the outcome of Melbourne Steamship v Moorehead. In any event there was a significant increase in support for all questions, however each question fell just short of a majority of voters, and a majority of the voters was achieved in 3 out of 6 states,

Writs were issued for a further referendum to be held on 11 December 1915 to cover substantially the same questions as were rejected in 1911 and 1913, however the referendum was cancelled and the writs withdrawn.

In 1926 the proposal from Prime Minister Bruce was again a compendium of measures, of which power to make laws about trusts and combinations in restraint of trade was a part. The proposal was supported by just 44% of voters, and a majority of the voters was achieved in 2 out of 6 states,

Results
Year	Question	NSW	Vic	Qld	SA	WA	Tas	States in favour	Voters in favour	Result
1911	(4) Trade and Commerce	36.11%	38.64%	43.75%	38.07%	54.86%	42.11%	1:5	39.42%	Not carried
1913	(9) Trusts	47.12%	49.71%	54.78%	51.67%	53.59%	45.38%	3:3	49.78%	Not carried
1926	(14) Industry and Commerce	51.53%	36.23%	52.10%	29.32%	29.29%	44.86%	2:4	43.50%	Not carried

=== Model Litigant provisions ===
The judgement of Griffith CJ continues to be cited as authority for the proposition that a public officer or agency is required to act as a "model litigant", reflecting the standards of fair dealing expected in the conduct of litigation. While aspects of the model litigant obligations are found in policy documents, the obligations have been held to be broader and more fundamental. The model litigant requirements have been applied to all three tiers of government, Australia, States, and local councils. Acting as a model litigant has both positive obligations and negative proscriptions, such as:

Positive obligations

- a public body has an obligation of "conscientious compliance with the procedures designed to minimise cost and delay";
- assisting "the court to arrive at the proper and just result":
- acting with a level of detachment in the interests of justice, rather than as a partisan seeking a particular outcome.

Negative proscriptions

- not taking purely technical points of practice and procedure:
- not unfairly impairing the other party's capacity to defend itself; and
- not taking advantage of its own default:
