= 1913 Australian referendum =

The 1913 Australian referendum was held on 31 May 1913. It contained six referendum questions and was held in conjunction with the 1913 federal election.

== Background ==
Having failed with the 1911 referendum, the Attorney-General, Billy Hughes, tried again, breaking each of the changes into separate questions. The changes were said to be necessary because the Commonwealth's powers had been cut down by successive decision of the High Court in applying the inter-governmental immunities and reserved state powers doctrines until they were said to be futile. The cases referred to by the Attorney-General were:

- Union label case (1908) - trade marks
- Huddart, Parker & Co Ltd v Moorehead (1909) - control of corporations
- SS Kalibia v Wilson (1910) - navigation power
- Melbourne Steamship Co Ltd v Moorehead (1912) - trade & commerce power
- Railway servants Case (1906) - State railways employees could not be part of an interstate industrial dispute
- Jumbunna Coal Mine NL v Victorian Coal Miners’ Association (1908) - appeal from the Court of Conciliation and Arbitration
- R v Commonwealth Court of Conciliation and Arbitration; Ex parte BHP (1909) - prohibition against the Court of Conciliation and Arbitration
- Federated Sawmill Employees Association v James Moore & Sons Pty Ltd (1909) - federal award could not be inconsistent with a State wages board determination
- Australian Boot Trade Employees' Federation v Whybrow & Co (1910) - Court of Conciliation and Arbitration could not make a common-rule award to prevent industrial disputes
- Federated Engine Drivers' & Firemen's Association of Australasia v Broken Hill Pty Co Ltd (1911) - a union in different industries could not be registered
- R v Barger (1908) - the New Protection policy, in which protection was linked to paying fair & reasonable wages, was invalid

== The results ==
Results
| Question | NSW | Vic | Qld | SA | WA | Tas | States in favour | Voters in favour | Result |
|---|---|---|---|---|---|---|---|---|---|
| (6) Trade and Commerce | 46.93% | 49.12% | 54.34% | 51.32% | 52.86% | 45.16% | 3:3 | 49.38% | Not carried |
| (7) Corporations | 46.79% | 49.14% | 54.31% | 51.34% | 52.84% | 45.08% | 3:3 | 49.33% | Not carried |
| (8) Industrial Matters | 46.88% | 49.02% | 54.36% | 51.40% | 52.71% | 45.20% | 3:3 | 49.33% | Not carried |
| (9) Trusts | 47.12% | 49.71% | 54.78% | 51.67% | 53.59% | 45.38% | 3:3 | 49.78% | Not carried |
| (10) Nationalization of Monopolies | 46.85% | 49.07% | 54.17% | 51.26% | 53.19% | 45.22% | 3:3 | 49.33% | Not carried |
| (11) Railway Disputes | 46.70% | 48.79% | 54.19% | 51.28% | 52.38% | 45.01% | 3:3 | 49.13% | Not carried |

== Aftermath ==
Writs were issued for a further referendum to be held on 11 December 1915 to cover substantially the same questions as were rejected in 1911 and 1913, however the referendum was cancelled and the writs withdrawn.

== See also ==
- Referendums in Australia
- Politics of Australia
- History of Australia
