= Australian Boot Trade Employees' Federation v Whybrow & Co =

Judgement of the High Court of Australia

Australian Boot Trade Employees Federation v Whybrow & Co (No 1)
- Court: High Court of Australia
- Full case name: Australian Boot Trade Employees Federation v Whybrow & Co and others
- Decided: 30 March 1910
- Citations: [1910] HCA 8, (1910) 10 CLR 266

Case history
- Prior actions: Australian Boot Trade Employees Federation v Whybrow & Co (Boot Trades Case) (1909) 4 CAR 1 per Higgins J President.

Court membership
- Judges sitting: Griffith CJ, Barton, O'Connor, Isaacs & Higgins JJ

R v Commonwealth Court of Conciliation and Arbitration; Ex parte Whybrow & Co (No 2)
- Court: High Court of Australia
- Full case name: The King v the Commonwealth Court of Conciliation and Arbitration and the President thereof and the Boot Trade Employees Federation. Ex parte Whybrow & Co and others.
- Decided: 10 July 1910
- Citations: [1910] HCA 33, (1910) 11 CLR 1

Court membership
- Judges sitting: Griffith CJ, Barton, O'Connor & Isaacs JJ

Australian Boot Trade Employees' Federation v Whybrow & Co (No 3)
- Court: High Court of Australia
- Full case name: Australian Boot Trade Employees' Federation v Whybrow & Co and others
- Decided: 10 October 1910
- Citations: [1910] HCA 53, (1910) 11 CLR 311

Court membership
- Judges sitting: Griffith CJ, Barton, O'Connor, Isaacs & Higgins JJ

Australian Boot Trade Employees Federation v Whybrow & Co, commonly known as Whybrow's case or the Boot Trades case, was the third of a series of decisions of the High Court of Australia in 1910 concerning the boot manufacturing industry and the role of the Commonwealth Court of Conciliation and Arbitration in preventing and settling industrial disputes. In doing so the High Court considered the constitutional power of the Federal Parliament to provide for common rule awards and the jurisdiction of the High Court to grant prohibition against the Arbitration Court. The majority held in Whybrow (No 1) that the Arbitration Court could not make an award that was inconsistent with a State law, but that different minimum wages were not inconsistent as it was possible to obey both laws. In Whybrow (No 2) the High Court established the doctrine of ambit, with the emphasis on the precise claim made and refused, and the practice with respect to "paper disputes" being treated "prima facie as genuine and real", with the majority holding that the High Court had power to order prohibition to correct jurisdictional error as part of its original jurisdiction. Finally in Whybrow (No 3) the High Court unanimously held that the Federal Parliament had no constitutional power to provide for common rule awards.

== Background ==
=== The constitution ===
One of the contentious issues in the Constitutional Conventions of the 1890s was the power of the Australian parliament to make laws concerning industrial disputes. The proposal was soundly defeated at the 1891, and 1897 conventions, but narrowly succeeded in 1898. All five High Court judges in 1910 had been leading participants in the Constitutional Conventions and all are properly seen as among the framers of the Constitution. The three inaugural 'federalist' judges, Griffith CJ, Barton & O'Connor JJ had all opposed the industrial dispute power while the two 'nationalist' judges, Isaacs & Higgins JJ had supported the power. Thus the clash between them is a continuation of the debate from the conventions concerning not only the capacity of the Australian parliament but also the nature of the Federal system.

The Australian parliament's conciliation and arbitration power is in subsection 51(xxxv) of the Constitution which provides:

The Parliament shall, subject to this Constitution, have power to make laws for the peace, order, and good government of the Commonwealth with respect to:

(xxxv) conciliation and arbitration for the prevention and settlement of industrial disputes extending beyond the limits of any one State;

The scope of this constitutional power had previously been considered by the High Court in 1908 in the Jumbunna case, and in 1909 in the Broken Hill case, and the Sawmiller's case,

=== Court of Conciliation and Arbitration ===
The Australian Boot Trade Employees Federation, a registered union sought the assistance of the Commonwealth Court of Conciliation and Arbitration under the Commonwealth Conciliation and Arbitration Act 1904, in relation to what the union said was an industrial dispute with boot manufacturers that extended beyond the limits of any one State. While Whybrow & Co is named in each of the three judgements, it was one of a wide range of boot manufacturers in four States, New South Wales, Queensland, South Australia and Victoria, who had received a letter from the union which gave the employers an ultimatum, either the employer agreed to the union's demands or the union would approach the Arbitration Court. Higgins J held that this was a valid means of establishing an industrial dispute and that there was discontent among employees that would have broken out in strikes but for the hope of relief from the Arbitration Court. The process of an establishing a dispute by way of serving a "log of claims", referred to as a paper dispute, was controversial at the time. The demands primarily concerned wages, unskilled labour, apprentices and boy labourers. In the Arbitration Court George Beeby appeared for the union, Mitchell KC and Starke appeared for some employers and various other employers were separately represented. In fixing the minimum wages, Higgins J adopted the requirement of a "living wage" he had established in the Harvester case despite the High Court holding in R v Barger that the Excise Act 1906 which gave rise to the Harvester decision was constitutionally invalid. Higgins J attributed criticism of the living wage as "the natural discontent of defeated parties and their partisans". In considering the claims in relation to apprentices, the Arbitration Court looked at the conditions for apprentices in the boot trade, community concerns, the implications for employers as well as the availability of technical schools as part of that apprenticeship. While the decision states that the scale of wages should be higher towards the end of the apprenticeship, the proposed award set wages for apprentices and other boys according to their age.

=== The question of law for the High Court ===
In the Sawmillers' case, the High Court had been divided 2:2 and thus the decision of the Chief Justice prevailed, in what is sometimes described as a statutory majority. Griffith CJ, O'Connor J agreeing, held that the Arbitration Court could not make an award that was inconsistent with the minimum wages fixed by a Wages Board under a State law. Higgins J stated two questions of law to be determined by the full court of the High Court:

1. Whether under the Constitution it is competent for the Commonwealth Court or Conciliation and Arbitration to make any award which is inconsistent with certain awards or determinations of State Wages Board in the States of New South Wales, Queensland, South Australia, and Victoria.
2. Whether in the draft award annexed to the special case there are any provisions inconsistent with such awards or determinations.

Higgins J did not refer a question in relation to making the award a common rule as the respondent employers would be bound by the award and the High Court would not decide the point without hearing from employers who were not respondents.

== Australian Boot Trade Employees Federation v Whybrow and Co (No 1) ==
The High Court answered both questions in the negative. The majority, Griffith CJ, Barton & O'Connor JJ, in separate decisions, applied the decision in the Sawmillers case, holding that the Arbitration Court could not make an award that was inconsistent with a State law. There were two fundamental propositions that were central to the judgments of the majority, (1) the reserved powers doctrine that power to regulate the domestic trade and commerce was reserved to the State and that the Australian parliament could not invade that sphere and (2) that arbitration was the exercise of judicial power and that the Arbitration Court was required to determine the matter according to law, including State law. Section 109 of the Constitution, did not apply because the Arbitration Court was required to declare and administer the law, not make it, thus an award made by the Arbitration Court was not a federal law that would prevail over a State law. Discontent with a State law was not an industrial dispute between employees and their employer. On the question of inconsistency the majority held the question was whether it was impossible to obey both laws. Because an employer could agree to pay more than the State minimum wage, the Arbitration Court could order the employer to pay more than the minimum.

Isaacs & Higgins JJ maintained their rejection of the reserved powers doctrine, and their dissent from the Sawmillers case. Isaacs J held that arbitration that imposes new obligations was not the exercise of judicial power, but rather legislation. The binding nature of an award arose because of the federal law, thus if there was inconsistency, the federal law prevailed. The judgment of Isaacs J argues from the premise that the fundamental basis of the Australian legal system was as an enactment of the Imperial Parliament. On the question of inconsistency, Isaacs J set out what would become the cover the field test. Higgins J similarly held that a rule of conduct prescribed by the Arbitration Court was given the character of a law by the federal Conciliation and Arbitration Act. On the question of inconsistency, Higgins J adopted the same test as the majority, whether it was impossible to obey both laws.

== R v Commonwealth Court of Conciliation and Arbitration; Ex parte Whybrow and Co (No 2) ==
After the High Court gave the answers to the stated case, the Arbitration Court made an award in accordance with the proposed minutes. The boot manufacturing employers applied to the High Court for a writ of prohibition compelling the Arbitration Court, the President who was a judge of the High Court, and the union to appear before the High Court to show cause why they should not be prohibited from further proceeding on the award. Because Higgins J was a defendant to the application he did not hear the case. The grounds for the application concerned

- the constitutional power of the Australian parliament to provide for compulsory arbitration and common rule awards;
- whether the "paper dispute" established an interstate industrial dispute
- whether the award went beyond the matters in dispute.

=== Prohibition ===
The union objected to the application for prohibition, arguing that the order sought was an exercise of the High Court's appellate jurisdiction, and not its original jurisdiction. The significance of the objection was that the Constitution permits the Australian Parliament to limit appeals to the High Court, but not to limit the exercise of its original jurisdiction. The Conciliation and Arbitration Act provided at s 31 that "No award of the Court shall be challenged, appealed against, reviewed, quashed, or called in question in any other Court on any account whatever", an issue that had not been considered by the High Court in R v Commonwealth Court of Conciliation and Arbitration; Ex parte BHP. The majority, Griffith CJ, Barton & O'Connor JJ held that prohibition was an exercise of the High Court's original jurisdiction. and that s 31 of the Conciliation and Arbitration Act was not effective to deny the High Court's jurisdiction to order prohibition. Isaacs J dissented on this point, holding that prohibition was an exercise of the High Court's appellate jurisdiction. The High Court was required to consider the operation of the power to grant prohibition, rather than whether prohibition was the appropriate remedy. In this way the High Court granted prohibition where certiorari would have been an appropriate remedy and extended the scope of prohibition beyond generally accepted limits.

=== Compulsory arbitration ===
The boot manufacturers argued that arbitration required the voluntary submission to the tribunal and a choice by the disputants as to how the tribunal was constituted and that the compulsory arbitration provided for by the Conciliation and Arbitration Act, was unconstitutional. This argument was rejected by each of the judges.

=== Common rule award ===
The Conciliation and Arbitration Act provided at s 38(f) that the Arbitration Court could declare an award to be a common rule of any industry. The other constitutional argument was that the Australian parliament had no power to provide for common rule awards. There were two impediments to this argument (1) the award had not at that time been declared to be a common rule award and (2) The boot manufacturers who applied to the High Court were all parties to the dispute and thus would be bound by the Award regardless. As Higgins had noted, the High Court will not answer a constitutional question unless it is necessary. The State of Victoria had intervened in the case to protect the public of that State from the operation of what it said was an invalid federal law. The argument was that the common rule provisions were invalid and could not be severed from the balance of the Act, such that the entire Act was invalid.

Barton O'Connor and Isaacs JJ declined to express a view on whether the common rule provisions were invalid, holding that on the assumption that the common rule provisions were unconstitutional, they were severable from the Act. That is the Award was valid, even if the common rule aspect was unconstitutional.

Griffith CJ expressed stronger views in relation to the constitutionality of the common rule provisions, stating that the function of an arbitrator was a judicial function that could only be exercised between parties to the dispute and after hearing them. The power to make a common rule award was a legislative function which, consistent with the decision in Whybrow (No 1), could not be conferred on the Arbitration Court. Griffith CJ emphasised the settlement of disputes between parties, with no apparent consideration as to the constitutional power in relation to the prevention of disputes. Griffith CJ held that the common rule provisions being unconstitutional did not invalidate the entire Act.

=== Paper dispute as to wages ===
The President found that of the 23 matters in the log of claims, only two matters were really in dispute, wages and the use of boy labour. The boot manufacturers argued that this finding meant that there was no industrial dispute necessary for the Arbitration Court to have jurisdiction. The establishment of a dispute by way of a log of claims had been rejected by the majority of the High Court in the Sawmillers case. Griffiths CJ, with whom Barton J relevantly agreed, held that the evidence established a dispute extending over the four States in relation to wages and that the service of the log of claims crystallised this dispute into a claim for a definite sum. Isaacs J held that a clear demand from the union, coupled with the absence of any response from the employers was sufficient, that a "a dispute raised in a formal and complete way is to be taken prima facie as genuine and real".

=== Ambit ===
On the question of apprentices or boy labour, Griffith CJ held that prior to the service of the log of claims the only dispute common to the States related to their number as a proportion of journeymen. The log of claims demanded wages for apprentices that were fixed upon the basis of experience. Griffith CJ held that the Arbitration Court had no jurisdiction to go beyond the demand made. The award could not stand until the error was corrected in that otherwise apprentices would have to be paid the full adult wage. O'Connor J similarly held that the Arbitration Court had exceeded its jurisdiction when it was never in controversy between the parties that experience combined with age was the basis on which the pay of apprentices should be regulated. Likewise Isaacs J held that that "as to some apprentices more [was] awarded than was asked for and refused, and therefore more than was in dispute. It is the dispute that has to be regarded and adjudicated upon."

== Australian Boot Trade Employees' Federation v Whybrow and Co (No 3) ==
The union, represented by Arthur, applied for the award to be declared a common rule for the boot, shoe and slipper industry within New South Wales, Victoria, South Australia, Queensland and Tasmania. No employer in Tasmania had been served with the log of claims. 35 employers, represented by Starke, objected to the award being made a common rule on the ground that the provisions were unconstitutional. The President again stated a case for the High Court to decide the question of law. Beeby, having previously represented the union, now represented some employers who were respondents to the award, including Whybrow & Co. The respondent employers argued that the common rule was necessary for the effective settlement and prevention of dispute, This argument reflected the employer's economic interest in competition from boot manufacturers paying lower wages. The Commonwealth, represented by Duffy KC intervened to support the validity of the Act while Victoria, represented by Irvine KC intervened to argue the Act was invalid.

With the question of the common rule directly raised, Griffith CJ considered the constitutional power for the prevention of disputes, maintaining his view that both dispute and arbitration connotes the existence of parties taking opposite sides. Both the employer and employees may be happy with their current arrangements such that there was no dispute to be prevented and that the making of a common rule award was the exercise of legislative power. Barton J reiterated that arbitration for the settlement of a dispute confines the award to the ambit of the dispute and to binding only the disputants. Barton J similarly rejected the notion that there could be arbitration to prevent a dispute and that arbitration connotes the settlement of a dispute between parties. O'Connor J held that arbitration involved "a judicial settlement of matters in difference between parties to a dispute" and that the effect of a common rule "is to confer a law making power, and not an arbitral power". There could be no arbitration in the absence of disputing parties.

Isaacs J put it slightly differently, rejecting a level of precision about the scope of the differences, but holding that arbitration, whether for settlement or prevention of a dispute, could only occur "where some difference can be perceived, and expressed in terms, however/general, between the parties who are to be affected by the decision."

While all five judges are properly seen as among the framers of the Constitution, it was Higgins J who had taken a leading role in the Constitutional Conventions for the federal government the power to make laws relating to the conciliation and arbitration of industrial disputes. As with the judgement of Isaacs J in Whybrow (No 1), Higgins J argues from the premise that the fundamental basis of the Australian legal system was that power was conferred on the Federal Parliament, not by the people of Australia but by the British parliament. Higgins J rejected the premise that the parties to the dispute needed to have taken a definite stand or made definite claims, but that an order or award could not be made except as against identified or identifiable parties.

== Aftermath ==
The propositions in Whybrow (No 1) did not survive long. The notion that making an award, as opposed to its enforcement, was the exercise of the judicial power of the Commonwealth was challenged by Isaacs, Rich & Powers JJ in their judgments in Waterside Workers' Federation of Australia v J W Alexander Ltd, and in R v Hibble; Ex parte BHP. The reserved powers doctrine on which the decision of the majority was based was unambiguously rejected by the High Court in the 1920 Engineers' Case, after changes in the composition of the Court. The proposition that the Arbitration Court could not make an award that was inconsistent with a State law was reversed in the 1926 case of Clyde Engineering Co Ltd v Cowburn, with the majority adopting the "cover the field" test for inconsistency first propounded by Isaacs J in Whybrow (No 1).

The effect of Whybrow (No 2) was much more long lived. It was the foundation of the doctrine of ambit, with the emphasis on the precise claim made and refused, and the practice with respect to "paper disputes" as being treated "prima facie as genuine and real" had been followed by the High Court ever since.

=== Prohibition ===
On the question of prohibition, Whybrow (No 2) was one of a series in which the High Court asserted its power to correct jurisdictional error and in doing so expanded the scope of prohibition beyond the reach it had in English courts. The Parliament subsequently amended the Conciliation and Arbitration Act in an attempt to prevent the High Court from granting prohibition against the Arbitration Court.

- Tramways case, (1914): in which the High Court considered the effect of the amendment. The Court refused to overrule Whybrow (No 2) and held that the amendments to s 31 were not effective to remove the constitutional availability of prohibition and mandamus.
- R v Hibble; Ex parte BHP (1921): the High Court held that prohibition lies under s 75(v) of the constitution in relation to jurisdictional error.
- R v Hickman; Ex parte Fox and Clinton (1945): the High Court again considered the nature of prohibition and held that prohibition lies under s 75(v) of the constitution in relation to jurisdictional error.
- Kirk v Industrial Court of NSW (2010): the High Court held that State Parliaments cannot prevent State Supreme Courts from issuing prerogative relief for jurisdictional error.

=== Common rule awards ===
The 1911 referendum sought to address the decision in Whybrow (No 3) to give the Federal parliament the power to directly regulate the wages and conditions of labour, however this was soundly defeated, obtaining the support of 39.4% of voters and a majority in only one State, Western Australia. Whybrow (No 3) was one of 11 decisions of the High Court referred to by the Attorney-General, Billy Hughes, as cutting down the Commonwealth's powers until they were futile and justifying the changes proposed in the 1913 referendum. The 1913 referendum would have given the Federal parliament the power to directly regulate the terms and conditions of employment, however this too was defeated, albeit narrowly, obtaining the support of 49.3% of voters and a majority in only three States, Queensland, South Australia and Western Australia.

One effect of the emphasis in Whybrow (No 3) to the parties to the dispute was to exclude the possibility of an award being binding on employers who did not employ union members. This emphasis was overturned by the High Court in Burwood Cinema Ltd v Australian Theatrical and Amusement Employees Association, on the basis that unions have an interest in protecting their members' working conditions and consequently, ensuring that these conditions are not undermined by employers employing non-union members at lower rates of pay or on lower conditions. The emphasis on the need for a dispute has been said to have resulted in the prevention limb of the Federal parliaments power going largely unused.

There were no federal common rule awards until Victoria referred powers to the Commonwealth, in 2003 to provide for the Australian Industrial Relations Commission to make common rule awards for Victoria.

The constitutional basis for the regulation of terms and conditions of employment changed as a result of the Workplace Relations Amendment (Work Choices) Act 2005 (Cth), which did not rely on the Australian parliament's conciliation and arbitration power instead being primarily founded on the corporations power.

WorkChoices was replaced by the Fair Work Act 2009, which was similarly founded on the corporations power and not the conciliation and arbitration power. In addition the Fair Work Act relied on a referral of power from most States. The Fair Work Act established common rule awards called "Modern Awards" that are of general application and set out minimum terms and conditions for particular industries and occupations. As of May 2016 there were 122 modern awards of general application.
