= Janet Charlotte Mitchell =

Australian journalist and author (1896–1957)

Janet Charlotte Mitchell (3 November 1896 – 6 September 1957) was an Australian banker, journalist and author who travelled regularly, including to China, where she researched and wrote her novel Tempest in Paradise (1935).

She was the first Australian woman to hold an executive position in any major Australian Bank.

== Biography ==
Mitchell was born in Melbourne and was the fourth daughter of Edward Fancourt Mitchell and his wife Eliza née Fraser; her older sister is Isabel Mary Mitchell. She attended school at Scotch College, where their maternal grandfather Alexander Morrison was the headmaster, and also at home under the supervision of a governess. As a young woman Mitchell was also able to take extended European tours, some of which coincided with her father's travel there to try cases.

In 1917 Mitchell became a licentiate of the Royal Academy of Music, a conservatory in London, and, in 1922 graduated from the University of London with a Bachelor of Arts.

After completing her studies Mitchell returned to Australia where she was involved in various charitable works including as the education secretary of the Young Women's Christian Association in Melbourne (1924–1926) and directing the thrift services of the Government Savings Bank of New South Wales (1926–1931) where she was the first woman to hold an executive position within a big Australian bank.

Mitchell was also active in the League of Nations Union between 1925 and 1931 and acted as a delegate to international conferences including one in Honolulu at the Institute of Pacific Relations in 1925 where she learnt about a new radium cure for leprosy which she then reported back to Australian newspapers about. Another conference she attended was in the 1931 conference of the Institute of Pacific Relations in Hangzhou, and while there she travelled on further to Harbin to report on the Japanese occupation of Manchuria, which she witnessed over a year long period in 1932, at some personal risk. This visit would form the basis of her only novel Tempest in Paradise (1935) which she dedicated to her cousin George Ernest Morrison.

In 1933 Mitchell became the acting principal of The Women's College at the University of Sydney until 1936 when she became the warden at Ashburne College within the University of Manchester before resigning in 1940 citing health reasons; during this period she also worked as a journalist and published her autobiography Spoils of Opportunity (1938). She then returned to Australia again and converted to Catholicism and began working for the Australian Broadcasting Commission as an assistant in youth education between 1941 and 1955.

She died on 6 September 1957.
