= Federated Sawmill Employees Association v James Moore & Sons Pty Ltd =

Landmark Australian court case

- Court: High Court of Australia
- Full case name: The Federated Saw Mill, Timber Yard, and General Woodworkers Employees' Association of Australasia Claimants v James Moore and Sons Proprietary Limited and Others Respondents.
- Decided: 25 June 1909
- Citations: [1909] HCA 43, (1909) 8 CLR 465

Court membership
- Judges sitting: Griffith CJ, O'Connor, Isaacs & Higgins JJ

Case opinions
- 2:2 The Arbitration Cort could not make an award that was inconsistent with a State wages board determination. (per Griffith CJ & O'Connor J; Isaacs & Higgins JJ dissenting)

Federated Sawmill Employees Association v James Moore & Sons Pty Ltd, commonly known as the Woodworkers case or the Sawmillers case was a decision of the High Court of Australia in 1909 concerning the question whether the Commonwealth Court of Conciliation and Arbitration could make an award that was inconsistent with a State wages board determination. The High Court was divided 2:2 and thus the decision of the Chief Justice prevailed, in what is sometimes described as a statutory majority. Griffith CJ, O'Connor J agreeing, held that the Arbitration Court could not make an award that was inconsistent with the minimum wages fixed by a Wages Board under a State law.

The case dealt with three issues, (1) whether arbitration was a judicial or legislative function, (2) the position of federal awards in relation to a conflict of laws and (3) the facts necessary to establish the existence of an interstate industrial dispute.

Fundamental to the opinions of Griffith CJ and O'Connor J was the reserved powers doctrine, that the powers of the Australian Parliament were limited to preserve the powers that were intended to be left to the States. The reserved powers doctrine was challenged by Isaacs and Higgins JJ and ultimately abandoned by the High Court in 1920 in the Engineers' Case. While Griffith CJ and O'Connor J approached the arbitral function as an exercise of judicial power, this would also be subsequently rejected by the High Court resolving that arbitration was the exercise of a legislative function. The decision of Griffiths CJ and Higgins J approached the conflict of laws issue on the narrow test of whether it was possible to obey both laws, an approach that was considerably expanded from 1926 by the adoption of the "cover the field test". The paper dispute, doubted by Griffith CJ and O'Connor J in this case, would become an enduring feature of Australian industrial relations.

== Background ==
All five High Court judges in 1909 had been leading participants in the Constitutional Conventions and all are properly seen as among the framers of the Constitution. The conciliation and arbitration power had been a contentious issue in those debates, in which the three inaugural 'federalist' judges, Griffith CJ, Barton & O'Connor JJ had all opposed the industrial dispute power, while the two 'nationalist' judges, Isaacs & Higgins JJ had supported the power. The case is properly seen as a continuation of unresolved debates from the Constitutional Conventions of the 1890s about the roles of the state and national governments,

The conciliation and arbitration power had arisen following the bitter and protracted strikes of the 1890s, particularly the 1890 maritime strike and the shearer's strikes of 1891 and 1894. By reference to this history, O'Connor J characterised an industrial dispute as being characterised as unable to be resolved by ordinary tribunals as it was not about the breach or observance of existing contracts, but rather grievances that had developed under the existing contracts and for securing a new agreement.

Prior to 1900 there had been various attempts to legislate with respect to industrial disputes, including South Australia, NSW, New Zealand, and the United Kingdom.

The passage of the Conciliation and Arbitration Bill in the Australian Parliament was itself problematic, as Alfred Deakin's Protectionist Party relied upon the support of the Labour Party. The Labour Party sought to amend the Bill to cover State railway employees, and a number of radicals in Deakin's government, including Isaacs and Higgins, supported the amendments and helped bring down the government, with Labour forming a minority government under Prime Minister Chris Watson. The Commonwealth Conciliation and Arbitration Act 1904 was finally passed in December 1904,

The Federated Sawmill, Timber Yard, and General Woodworkers' Union was one of the first unions registered. It was represented by Arthur and applied for an award to be made, seeking to establish the existence of an inter-state dispute by evidence they had served written claims on employers in various states. The majority of employers were represented by Mitchell KC with one employer represented by Irvine KC. The first issue in contention was whether there was an industrial dispute that extended beyond the limits of one state. One of the arguments advanced was that the businesses were distinct and were not acting in concert, an argument that passed without any apparent reference to almost all employers being represented by the same lawyers. The second issue was whether there was a genuine dispute, as the union sought to establish the dispute by reference to the service by it of written claims and the non-acceptance by the employers. A third issue concerned the extent to which the Arbitration Court could make an award that was inconsistent with a state wages board determination or a state award. In the High Court NSW intervened, represented by Blacket as did the Commonwealth represented by Duffy KC.

== Decision ==
One aspect of the decision on which all judges agreed was that the High Court would not determine hypothetical or abstract question with Griffith stating "The questions submitted in the case are to a great extent of an abstract character. In my judgment the provisions of sec. 31 were not intended to allow the submission of hypothetical or abstract questions of law which may never arise for actual decision. Any opinions expressed by the Court on such questions can only be obiter dicta of more or less weight, but having no binding authority". Higgins J agreed with the principle, but having formulated the questions stated for consideration, disagreed that the questions were abstract or hypothetical. Higgins J did accept that some of the questions could not be categorically answered as the involved cinsideration of facts that had not been determined.

Fundamental to the judgment of Griffith CJ was the doctrine of reserved powers, stating "pl. xxxv. is to be construed having regard to the rest of the Constitution, and particularly with reference to the doctrine repeatedly laid down by this Court that any invasion by the Commonwealth of the sphere of the domestic concerns of the States appertaining to trade and commerce is forbidden except so far as the invasion is authorized by some power conferred in express terms or by necessary implication". O'Connor J similarly held that the States had exclusive control over industry operating solely within a State. Isaacs and Higgins JJ had rejected the reserved powers doctrine from the moment of their appointment in 1906, a position they maintained in their judgments.

=== Judicial or legislative function ===
The view expressed by Griffith CJ, and O'Connor J, was that arbitration was a judicial function, decided in accordance with the law, including state laws. The opposing view was described by Griffiths CJ as akin to a legislative power, was that the ability to settle an industrial dispute was not limited by the effect of state laws, although neither Isaacs J, nor Higgins J, ascribed to the categorisation of the arbitral power as judicial or legislative, instead holding that the state laws did not limit the arbitral power or its exercise.

=== Conflict of laws ===
The way in which the Australian Parliament sought to deal with State laws was set out in section 30 of the Conciliation and Arbitration Act which provided that:

30. When a State law or an award order or determination of a State Industrial Authority is inconsistent with an award or order lawfully made by the Court, the latter shall prevail, and the former shall, to the extent of the inconsistency, be invalid.

Isaacs J saw the conflict of laws as the central question to be determined, holding in emphatic terms that "The moment we depart from the clear terms of sec. 109 of the Constitution, there is nothing but chaos. That clause and covering clause V. form the keystone of the federal structure, and if they are once loosened, Australian union is but a name, and will reside chiefly in the pious aspirations for unity contained in the preamble to the Constitution."

Both Griffiths CJ, and Higgins J, were more circumspect, limiting their consideration on the question of inconsistency to whether it was possible to obey both commands.

=== A paper dispute ===
Griffith CJ and O'Connor J rejected the attempt to establish jurisdiction to make an award by way of a "paper dispute". Griffith CJ held that the term "industrial dispute" connotes a real and substantial difference having some element of persistency, and likely, if not adjusted, to endanger the industrial peace of the community. It must be a real and genuine dispute, not fictitious or illusory. Such a dispute is not created by a mere formal demand and formal refusal without more".

Similarly O'Ocnnor J held that "the Convention and the British Parliament were dealing with the subject practically, that they had in mind actual differences between employers and employees, differences of the kind which the public interests demanded should be submitted to a federal tribunal. They were thinking of real industrial disputes, not of industrial disputes that existed only on paper, or were got up for the attainment of some other and ulterior object than the settlement of differences between employers and employees."

== Aftermath ==
The significance of the Sawmillers case does not arise from the dubious nature of its authority as a precedent in that it was a split decision, but rather from the adoption of its reasons by the majority in Whybrow's case (No 1), which also held that the question for inconsistency was whether it was impossible to obey both laws. Because an employer could agree to pay more than the State minimum wage, the Arbitration Court could order the employer to pay more than the minimum. The reserved powers doctrine on which the decision of the majority was based was unambiguously rejected by the High Court in the 1920 Engineers' Case, after changes in the composition of the Court.

=== Arbitration as a judicial function ===
The exercise of arbitration as a judicial function was first challenged in Waterside Workers' Federation of Australia v J W Alexander Ltd, where the majority, Barton, Isaacs, Powers and Rich JJ held that a judge of a federal court was required to be appointed for life. Because the President of the Arbitration Court was appointed for seven years, the Arbitration Court could not exercise federal judicial power. This raised the issue as to whether the invalidity extended to awards that had been made under the arbitration power. A different majority, Isaacs, Higgins, Powers and Rich JJ held that the making of an award was not the exercise of a judicial function, these portions of the Act could be severed and that the rest of the Act was valid.

From 1926 the Arbitration Court was constituted by judges who were appointed for life and the Court exercised byoth judicial and arbitral functions. In 1956 the High Court held that no federal court could exercise both judicial and arbitral powers. Following this decision the judicial and arbitral functions were separated, with the judicial functions performed by the Commonwealth Industrial Court, now the Federal Court while the arbitral functions were performed by the Commonwealth Conciliation and Arbitration Commission, now the Fair Work Commission.

=== Conflict of laws ===
The judgment of Griffith CJ was criticised by later Chief Justice Owen Dixon as taking a pedantic construction drawn from a verbal formalism. The proposition that the Arbitration Court could not make an award that was inconsistent with a State law had been reversed in the 1926 case of Clyde Engineering Co Ltd v Cowburn, with the majority adopting the "cover the field" test for inconsistency first propounded by Isaacs J in Whybrow (No 1). There was no relevant change way in which the legislation approached the potential conflict between federal awards and state laws, continuing to expressly provide that federal awards should operate to the exclusion of state laws and awards, and instead what had changed was the interpretation of those words by the High Court from 1926. A subsequent High Court explained the approach as follows:

The basis of the application of s 109 to a State law affecting industrial relations regulated by an award is not that the award is a law of the Commonwealth within the meaning of s 109 but that the Conciliation and Arbitration Act constitutes the inconsistent Federal law inasmuch as it means that an award purporting to make an exhaustive regulation shall be treated as the exclusive determination of the industrial relations which it affects. "The award itself is, of course, not law, it is a factum merely. But once it is completely made, its provisions are by the terms of the Act itself brought into force as part of the law of the Commonwealth"

=== Paper disputes ===
The High Court held in Whybrow's case held that the ambit of an interstate industrial dispute could be established by way of a paper dispute, provided the court was satisfied as a question of fact that the dispute was real and genuine. In the Whybrow case Higgins J had held that of the 23 matters in the log of claims there were only two matters that were genuinely in dispute. In this way the establishment of a paper dispute by serving a log of claims and its counterpoint argument as to whether the dispute was real and genuine were a feature of Australian industrial relations.
