= SS Kalibia v Wilson =

The Owners of the S.S. Kalibia v Alexander Wilson
- Court: High Court of Australia
- Decided: 30 March 1910
- Citations: [1970] HCA 77, (1910) 11 CLR 689

Case history
- Prior action: In re Wilson (1910) 27 WN (NSW) 73 per Gordon J
- Appealed from: Supreme Court (NSW)

Court membership
- Judges sitting: Griffith CJ, Barton, O'Connor, Isaacs & Higgins JJ

SS Kalibia v Wilson, was the first decision of the High Court of Australia on the extent of the power of the Australian Parliament to make laws about shipping and navigation, including the Admiralty jurisdiction of the High Court. The High Court held that the power was limited to overseas and interstate trade and commerce. There was no separate power about navigation and shipping.

== Background ==
=== The Constitution ===
Section 51 of the Constitution provides that the Australian Parliament has the power to make laws with respect to:

(i) trade and commerce with other countries, and among the States;

Section 98 of the Constitution then provides that

The power of the Parliament to make laws with respect to trade and commerce extends to navigation and shipping, and to railways the property of any State.

The Parliament can also make laws conferring original jurisdiction on the High Court in any matter of Admiralty and maritime jurisdiction.

The early drafts of the Constitution gave the Australian parliament power to make laws with respect to "navigation and shipping" as a separate head of power under section 51. In 1898 the drafting committee made two relevant changes, to remove shipping and navigation to section 98 and to make it a part of the trade and commerce power in section 51(1). It is not apparent from the debates why this was done, nor was there any apparent consideration as to the effect of the change.

=== The Seamen's Compensation Act ===
The Seamen's Compensation Act was a uniform law that applied to all seamen on Australian registered ships and to Australian seamen on British and foreign ships engaged in the Australian coasting trade. The coasting trade was defined as carrying cargo from one port in Australia to another, even if those ports were in the same State. Because the trade and commerce power is limited to overseas and inter-state trade, there needed to be some other head of federal power to support its validity in providing for intrastate trade. The Commonwealth argued this power was found in sections 76(iii) and 98 of the Constitution.

=== The Facts ===
The Kalibia was a British flagged screw steamer (SS) owned by the Clyde Shipping Company of Glasgow, that in 1909 had been chartered to carry cargo from New York to Australia, offloading cargo at Adelaide, Melbourne, Sydney and Brisbane. The first officer agreed to transport a small package from Adelaide to Brisbane that had been mistakenly offloaded from another cargo ship. It was alleged that the SS Kalibia had taken horses from Melbourne to Brisbane, but this was later agreed to be wrong.

In Melbourne the crew, described as Lascars, deserted the ship, complaining of being ill-treated and underfed. On arrival in Sydney the men were charged with combining to disobey lawful commands and were sentenced to imprisonment for 6 weeks, being the time the vessel would be absent from Sydney, at the end of which they would be placed on the vessel for the homeward journey.

The crew were replaced for the voyage to Brisbane by an Australia crew, including Alexander Wilson. Wilson was seriously injured on 29 April 1910 when he was knocked into the vessel's hold. He applied to the Supreme Court of NSW for an order that the ship be detained until a security bond was paid to cover any compensation that might be awarded to Wilson. Justice Street made an order in the absence of the owners of the SS Kalibia (ex parte). The owners sought to have the order set aside however Justice Gordon refused, holding that there was some evidence that the ship was engaged in the coasting trade and whether this was correct was a matter to be determined at trial. If the ship was permitted to depart Australia without providing security then Wilson would have no recourse. The security was subsequently set by consent at £500.

== The High Court ==
=== Nature of the order ===
It was argued for Wilson that the order of Street J was "ministerial" rather than judicial and as such Gordon J had no jurisdiction to discharge the order and there was no appeal to the High Court. Griffith CJ was the only judge to deal with this argument in detail, holding that a power conferred upon a judicial officer was judicial unless there were "clear words to show that it was dictatorial and unappealable". It was an elementary rule of justice that a party affected by an ex-parte order could apply to have the order discharged.

=== The coasting trade ===
Wilson had been engaged in Australia on a British ship, the critical point for the success of his application was whether the Kalibia was engaged in the coasting trade which required loading cargo in one Australian port to be unloaded at another. The only thing taken on board in Australia was the small case carried by the first officer as a favour for a shipping agent. Griffith CJ held that the essence of trade was a contract of carriage made on behalf of the ship and the case was therefore not cargo. Barton J similarly held that gratuitous carriage was not sufficient and that trading in this context connoted payment for freight. O'Connor J held that the isolated transaction had no trace of trade or business and was not conducted with the authority of the owners. Isaacs J also held that the captain had no apparent authority to engage in the coasting trade.

=== The Act was unconstitutional ===
The court's finding that the Kalibia was not engaged in the coasting trade meant it was unnecessary to decide the constitutional validity of the Act, and the Court would not normally do so. On this occasion however each of the judges felt it was appropriate to express their opinion on the validity of the Act. albeit Higgins J did so with considerable reservation. One objection was that compensation for seamen did not fall within trade and commerce. None of the judges determined this objection. Each of the judges held that by including all coasting trade in Australia, including intrastate trade, the Act went beyond the Commonwealth power. Section 98 of the constitution explained the meaning of "trade and commence" and did not remove the need for such trade to be "with other countries, and among the States". There are echoes of the reserved powers doctrine in the judgments of Griffiths CJ, Barton and O'Connor JJ however their judgments were not based on it. Isaacs and Higgins JJ, who steadfastly rejected the reserved powers doctrine, similarly found that there was no constitutional power to regulate shipping and navigation within the limits of a State.

Where the judges differed was in applying the test from the decided cases, whether the invalid provisions could be severed. Griffith CJ held that the Act intended to apply to all ships engaged in the coasting trade without distinction and that the provisions could not therefore be severed. Barton J held that the definition of coasting trade was unambiguous and it was not the role of the Court to re-write the definition to make it constitutional. O'Connor J held that the provisions of the Act could not be separated, such that the entire Act was invalid. Isaacs J held that Parliament had made no distinction between inter-State and intra-State trade and that the enactment was therefore invalid.

Higgins J dissented on the question of severability. His Honour had no doubt the Parliament intended the Act to apply to the coasting trade within the limits of a State, but that if Parliament had understood the limits of its power, the Act would have been limited to inter-State seamen.

=== s76(iii) ===
The Commonwealth argued that the Act was a valid exercise of power under section 76(iii) of the Constitution, asserting that "the Parliament may make laws in any matter of admiralty and maritime jurisdiction". That is that the power to give the High Court jurisdiction with respect to admiralty and maritime matters implied a power on the part of the Commonwealth tho legislate as to those matters. Griffith CJ described the argument as quite untenable. Barton J held that this was a matter in which the over-riding power on the subject was the Parliament of the United Kingdom. Isaacs J noted that section 76 related solely to Parliament conferring original jurisdiction on the High Court. His Honour distinguished between the interpretation and enforcement of admiralty and maritime law and the alteration of that law.

== Aftermath ==
The effect of the decision was that the Australian Parliament did not have power to alter maritime law or to deal with maritime affairs other than by reliance upon the heads of power in s 51, importantly (but not solely) the trade and commerce power. The decision has never been over-turned by the High Court, however doubts have been expressed about the legitimacy of the High Court's decision, with Higgins J describing the views on the reach of s 76(iii) expressed by Griffiths CJ, Barton and Isaacs JJ as obiter. More recently Justice Gummow, then sitting in the Federal Court, noted that Barton J's reasoning that Australia was not, in 1910, a "separated nation of independent sovereignty in its relation to the United Kingdom" no longer represented the modern constitutional position.

A replacement Seamen's Compensation Act was passed in 1911, which was limited in its application to ships engaged in trade and commerce with other countries or among the States. The 1911 Act was challenged in Australian Steamships Ltd v Malcolm on the basis that compensation for seamen did not fall within trade and commerce. The majority, Isaacs, Gavan Duffy, Powers and Rich JJ (Griffith CJ & Barton J dissenting) held that the Act was a valid exercise of the trade and commerce power.

In the Navigation Act 1912 (Cth) the Parliament sought to overcome the question of severability by the inclusion of a provision that the Act was to be "construed subject to the Constitution, and so as not to exceed the legislative power of the Commonwealth" a provision that, in 1930, would be added to the Acts Interpretation Act. There are limitations to the effectiveness of such an approach.

The Australian Law Reform Commission was asked to review all aspects of the Admiralty jurisdiction in Australia and chapter 5 of its report looked at both the history of the jurisdiction in Australia and made various recommendations for change, including the use of other constitutional heads of power as the foundation for Australian legislation. The report noted that the High Court had held in the Sea and Submerged lands case, that the territory of the States stopped at the low-water mark or at the line closing a bay, such that the external affairs power would permit the Parliament to make laws about ships voyaging from one port in Australia to another, even if those ports were in the same State. The Parliament subsequently enacted the Seafarers Rehabilitation and Compensation Act 1992 which relied upon additional heads of power, including the corporations power. In 2014 a Full Court of the Federal Court held that this meant the Act was effective in regulating the rights of employees of a trading corporation who worked on a vessel that was working in an area confined to the seas off Western Australia. The Court held it was unnecessary to decide the complex questions, arising from the decision in SS Kalibia v Wilson around whether the employer's business dealings were such that the ship was engaged in overseas or interstate trade or commerce.

=== The referendums ===
The Labor Party twice held referendums to consider proposed changes to the Constitution to overcome the decision of the High Court by removing the limitation on the trade and commerce power to be with other countries or among the States. Neither referendum was successful.

Results
Year	Question	NSW	Vic	Qld	SA	WA	Tas	States in favour	Voters in favour	Result
1911	(4) Trade and Commerce	36.11%	38.64%	43.75%	38.07%	54.86%	42.11%	1:5	39.42%	Not carried
1913	(6) Trade and Commerce	46.96%	49.12%	54.34%	51.32%	52.86%	45.16%	3:3	49.38%	Not carried

Writs were issued for a further referendum to be held on 11 December 1915 to cover substantially the same questions as were rejected in 1911 and 1913, however the referendum was cancelled and the writs withdrawn.

=== The SS Kalibia ===
On 30 November 1917, the SS Kalibia was in the Atlantic Ocean 29 nautical miles (54 km) south west of The Lizard, Cornwall (49°31′N 5°32′W) when it was torpedoed and sunk by the German submarine SM UB-80 with the loss of 25 of her crew.
