= 1913 Australian referendum (Industrial Matters) =

1913 Australian Industrial Matters referendum
- 31 May 1913
- Do you approve of the proposed law for the alteration of the Constitution entitled — "Constitution Alteration (Industrial Matters) 1912" ?

Results
Choice	Votes	%
Yes	961,601	49.33%
No	987,611	50.67%
Valid votes	1,949,212	95.98%
Invalid or blank votes	81,558	4.02%
Total votes	2,030,770	100.00%
Registered voters/turnout	2,760,216	73.57%

The Constitution Alteration (Industrial Matters) Bill 1912, was an unsuccessful referendum held in 1913 that sought to alter the Australian Constitution to give the Commonwealth legislative power in respect to industrial matters.

== Question ==
Do you approve of the proposed law for the alteration of the Constitution entitled 'Constitution Alteration (Industrial Matters) 1912'?

== Proposed Changes to the Constitution ==
The proposal was to alter the text of section 51 of the Constitution to read as follows:

51. The Parliament shall, subject to this Constitution, have Legislative power to make laws for the peace, order, and good government of the Commonwealth with respect to:

(xxxv.) ~~Conciliation and arbitration for the prevention and settlement of industrial disputes extending beyond the limits of any one State:~~

Labour, and employment, and unemployment, including-

(a) the terms and conditions of labour and employment in any trade, industry, occupation, or calling;
(b) the rights and obligations of employers and employés;
(c) strikes and lockouts;
(d) the maintenance of industrial peace; and
(e) the settlement of industrial disputes.

== Results ==
Result (Note: Handbook of the 44th Parliament (2014) "Part 5 - Referendums and Plebiscites - Referendum results". Parliamentary Library of Australia.)
State	Electoral roll	Ballots issued	For		Against		Informal
State	Electoral roll	Ballots issued	Vote	%	Vote	%	Informal
New South Wales	1,036,187	717,855	318,622	46.88	361,044	53.12	36,933
Victoria	830,391	626,861	297,892	49.02	309,804	50.98	18,837
Queensland	363,082	280,525	147,171	54.36	123,554	45.64	9,579
South Australia	244,026	195,463	96,626	51.40	91,361	48.60	7,259
Western Australia	179,784	132,149	66,451	52.71	59,612	47.29	5,753
Tasmania	106,746	80,398	34,839	45.20	42,236	54.80	3,197
Total for Commonwealth	2,760,216	2,033,251	961,601	49.33	987,611	50.67	81,558
Results	Obtained majority in three states and an overall minority of 26,010 votes. Not carried						

== Discussion ==
The 1911 referendum asked a single question that dealt with trade and commerce, corporations and industrial matters. This resolution separated each of those matters into a different question. Like its forebear, none of these resolutions were carried. On each of the many occasions a similar question was asked at a referendum the public decided not to vest power in the Commonwealth over these matters.

- 1911 referendum on trade and commerce

== See also ==
- Politics of Australia
- History of Australia
