= R v Commonwealth Court of Conciliation and Arbitration; Ex parte BHP =

Judgement of the High Court of Australia

- Court: High Court of Australia
- Full case name: The King v the Commonwealth Court of Conciliation and Arbitration. Ex parte the Broken Hill Proprietary Company Limited; the Commonwealth of Australia intervening.
- Decided: 23 April 1909
- Citations: [1909] HCA 20, (1909) 8 CLR 419

Case history
- Prior action: Barrier Branch of the Amalgamated Miners' Association of Broken Hill v Broken Hill Proprietary Co (1909) 3 CAR 1 per Higgins President.

Court membership
- Judges sitting: Griffith CJ, O'Connor & Isaacs JJ

R v Commonwealth Court of Conciliation and Arbitration; Ex parte BHP, was an early decision of the High Court of Australia concerning the jurisdiction of the Commonwealth Court of Conciliation and Arbitration in which the High Court controversially, granted prohibition against the Arbitration Court to prevent it from enforcing aspects of an industrial award. The High Court held that the Arbitration Court had gone beyond settling the dispute that had been submitted to it and in doing so had made a jurisdictional error.

== Background ==
=== Mining at Broken Hill ===
Mining commenced at Broken Hill, NSW in 1885, initially for lead in the form of galena and then the ore deposit was found to contain silver & zinc. As well as the mine at Broken Hill, the Broken Hill Proprietary Company Limited (BHP) had also established smelter operations at Port Pirie in South Australia. In 1892 there was a strike by miner's at Broken Hill that was precipitated by a decision to terminate the 1889 and 1890 agreements that prevented the introduction of a contract system for ore excavation and reduced the working week from 48 hours to 46. The strike was abandoned after 16 weeks when several strike leaders were imprisoned for 'unlawful conspiracy and inciting riots'. As a result of the defeat of the strike, there was a 10% reduction in wages, the working week went back up to 48 hours and contract mining continued. The defeat of this and other strikes of the 1890s, the maritime dispute and the shearers' strike, have been seen as the cause of the creation and electoral support for the Australian Labor Party. Not all historians accept this thesis with some doubting the simple causal relationship between the strike and the formation of the Labor party.

=== The constitution ===
The constitutional convention in 1891 came after the maritime dispute and at the start of the shearers' strike. It was with this background that Charles Kingston, the then Premier of South Australia, unsuccessfully proposed that the Australian parliament have the power to establish courts of conciliation and arbitration for the settlement of industrial disputes. The proposal was taken up at the 1897 conventions by H. B. Higgins, then a member of the Parliament of Victoria, later to become a judge of the High Court and the second President of the Arbitration court. The industrial disputes proposal was initially unsuccessful, however Higgins was undeterred and the proposal succeeded in 1898.

The Commonwealth power to make laws in relation to interstate industrial disputes is in subsection 51(xxxv) of the Constitution which provides:

The Parliament shall, subject to this Constitution, have power to make laws for the peace, order, and good government of the Commonwealth with respect to:

(xxxv) conciliation and arbitration for the prevention and settlement of industrial disputes extending beyond the limits of any one State;

=== The dispute at the BHP mine ===
In December 1906 BHP and the unions entered into a two-year agreement that increased wages at the mine with the lowest paid workers receiving a 15% increase from 7s 6d, per 8-hour shift to 8s 7½d, In August 1908 the Chairman of BHP stated that wages needed to be cut at its Broken Hill mine because low metals prices, particularly lead, were making the mine uneconomic. On 7 December 1908 BHP posted notices at Broken Hill and Port Pirie stating that "The bonus granted for two years dating from 1st January, 1907, will cease on 1st January, 1909, and that the present rate of wages, less the bonus, will remain in force" The bonus referred to was the agreed increase from 1906 and that what BHP intended to do was drop wages to the 1906 rates. The unions sought the assistance of the Commonwealth Court of Conciliation and Arbitration, seeking that the agreement reached with the other mining companies at Broken Hill should govern BHP and its employees. BHP wouldn't pay the 1908 rates and the employees wouldn't accept the 1906 rates with the result that all of BHPs operations at Broken Hill and Port Pirie shut down, with around 4,000 employees out of work. BHP offered to pay the employees the 1906 rates and put the difference into a trust fund that would depend on the decision of the Arbitration Court. The unions and employees set up pickets outside the operations to prevent them being operated by 'scabs'. The pickets were marred by violence, on Monday 4 January the Silverton Tramway was damaged by dynamite and stones were thrown at police. On Saturday 9 January 1909 the violence escalated with bloody clashes involving thousands of protesters and police, resulting charges of riot, rout and unlawful assembly. Five of those charged were tried in Albury with the balance dealt with by the local court. Walter Stokes, John May, Sid Robinson & E.H. Gray being convicted, while Tom Mann was subsequently acquitted. Harry Holland, Secretary of the Socialist Federation of Australia, was also tried in Albury on charges of sedition and inciting to violence over a speech he gave on 14 February in which he was alleged to have said "If you are going to fight, put a little ginger into it, or to be plain-spoken—dynamite. That's the way to win." He was convicted and sentenced to two years in gaol, although he was released after serving five to six months.

The President of the Court, Higgins J, maintained the requirement of a "living wage" he had established in the Harvester case, despite the High Court holding in R v Barger that the Excise Act 1906 which gave rise to the Harvester decision was constitutionally invalid. Higgins J made an award on 12 March 1909. holding that "unless great multitudes of people are to be irretrievably injured in themselves and in their families, it is necessary to keep this living wage as a thing sacrosanct, beyond the reach of bargaining". In this regard his Honour relied on the Court's function to settle disputes, holding that:

I cannot conceive of any such industrial dispute as this being settled effectively which fails to secure to the labourer enough wherewith to renew his strength and to maintain his home from day to day. He will dispute, he must dispute, until he gets this minimum; even as a man immersed can never rest until he gets his head above the water.

The award, to be applied at Broken Hill and Port Pirie was as follows:

1. Forty-eight hours per week shall constitute a full week's work.
2. The following official holidays shall be recognised and allowed :-Eight-hours Day, Christmas Day, Boxing Day, New Year's Day, Good Friday, Easter Monday.
3. Overtime shall be paid for at the rate of time and a quarter, including all time of work on a seventh day in any week, or on official holidays, and all time of work done in excess of the ordinary shift during each day of twenty-four hours shall be reckoned as overtime.
4. In setting contracts for breaking ore underground the representative of the Mining Company and the contractors shall exercise their best judgment so as to provide that each contractor shall earn 12S. per shift of eight hours.
5. Prescribe that the rates of wages appearing in the Schedule be the minimum rates paid to all members of the claimant organization who may be employed by the respondent Company during the term of this award.
6. Order that no contracts be set by the Company except as to work for which contracts have been usually set by the Company since the 11th December 1906.

=== The High Court application ===
BHP applied to the High Court for a writ of prohibition compelling the Arbitration Court and the President, a judge of the High Court, to appear before the court to show cause why they should not be prohibited from further proceeding on the award. BHP challenged the award on 7 grounds

1. There was no interstate industry;
2. There was no interstate dispute;
3. The miners had ceased to be employed before making the award;
4. Clauses (1) & (3) of the award was not part of the dispute at Port Pirie;
5. Clause 6 was not part of the dispute between the parties;
6. Clause 6 was beyond jurisdiction of the Arbitration Court;
7. If clause 6 was within jurisdiction then Act is unconstitutional.

Blackett appeared for the Arbitration Court. Arthur appeared for the Miners Association, Irvine KC represented BHP and Cullen KC appeared for the Commonwealth which intervened.

== Decision ==
The High Court made an order prohibiting the Arbitration Court from enforcing clauses 1 & 3 of the award at Port Pirie and clause 6.

=== Interstate industrial dispute ===
The majority, Griffith CJ & O'Connor J briefly rejected an interpretation of section 51(xxxv) that there must be an interstate industry, holding that this did not reflect the words of the constitution. Isaacs J held that even if there was such a requirement, the operations of BHP, from mining to smelting was part of the same industry.

Each of Griffith CJ, O'Connor & Isaacs JJ considered in detail whether the evidence established as a question of fact that there was an interstate dispute, referring to the decision in Jumbunna Coal Mine NL v Victorian Coal Miners' Association, before concluding that there was a "dispute extending beyond the limits of any one State". Implicit in the decision is that upon an application for a prerogative writ under s. 75 (v.) of the Constitution it is for the High Court to determine for itself whether a dispute really exists and to determine that upon evidence placed before the High Court.

=== The miners had ceased to be employed before making the award ===
None of the judges considered there was any substance to the argument that the miners in stopping work had ceased to be employed before the award was made, holding as a question of fact that the employees, while ceasing work, did not intend to end the employment relationship.

=== The extent of the dispute ===
Griffiths CJ rejected the contention of the President during the arbitration hearing that "in settling the dispute I have power to do anything in pursuance of the Act that may settle the dispute". holding that :

I cannot assent to that assertion of power in those terms. Sec. 38, par. (u), of the Act authorizes the Court to give all such directions and do all such things as it deems necessary or expedient in the premises. I apprehend that those words empower the President to deal with all matters incidental and ancillary, provided they are within the ambit of the dispute submitted to him. But the Court cannot of its own motion give directions in a matter not substantially involved in or connected with the disputes submitted to it.

It was a condition of the jurisdiction of the Arbitration Court not only that there should be a dispute extending beyond the limits of any one State, but also that the court should obtain cognizance of the dispute in accordance with the provisions of the Act. "This ... is a condition of jurisdiction: the dispute must not only exist but must be submitted to the court"

Similarly O'Connor J held that there were three conditions required to give the Arbitration Court jurisdiction: (1) the dispute must be an industrial dispute, extending beyond the limits of one State; (2) it must be between employer and employee; and (3) it must be duly brought under the cognizance of the Court, it being one of "the first principles of judicial determination, that no person should be called upon to answer a claim unless it is put in such a form as will give him notice of what he has to answer,"

The dispute in relation to contracts only went so far as clause 4 and did not extend to a limitation on any other contract and therefore clause 6 was beyond the jurisdiction of the Arbitration Court. Similarly the award limitation on hours at Port Pirie (clause 1) and the payment of overtime for work beyond those hours (clause 3) were not part of the dispute and were beyond the jurisdiction of the Arbitration Court.

=== Prohibition ===
The order sought by BHP was to prevent the Arbitration Court from enforcing the award, however the decision says nothing about who may enforce the award, in that section 44 permits any affected union member to enforce the award before any magistrate. The argument set out in the law report does not address the question of whether prohibition was the appropriate remedy and none of the judges referred to the issue. The traditional supervisory writ to keep an inferior court within the bounds of its authority was the writ of certiorari by which the decision of the lower court is brought up and quashed. The constitution however omits certiorari from those powers contained in setting out the original jurisdiction of the High Court. In this way the High Court granted prohibition where certiorari would have been an appropriate remedy and extended the scope of prohibition beyond generally accepted limits.

The Conciliation and Arbitration Act 1904 provided at s 31 that "No award of the Court shall be challenged, appealed against, reviewed, quashed, or called in question in any other Court on any account whatever". This aspect does not appear to have been given any consideration, neither in argument nor in the decision.

== Aftermath ==
Higgins J issued a statement following the decision of the High Court in which he took issue with various findings of fact made by the High Court.

While the award restored the miners wages to 8s 7½d per day, none of the miners received those wages as the mine had been closed since January 1909, and would not re-open for two years.

The case was one of 11 decisions of the High Court referred to by the Attorney-General, Billy Hughes, as cutting down the Commonwealth's powers until they were futile and justifying the changes proposed in the 1913 referendum. The case however was not decided on the basis of the constitution, thus despite the reference to this case by the Attorney-General, there was nothing in the 1913 referendum that would have affected its outcome.

The decision was one of a series in which the High Court asserted its power to correct jurisdictional error and in doing so expanded the scope of prohibition beyond the reach it had in English courts.

- Whybrow's case (1910): the High Court again granted prohibition against the Arbitration Court, holding that prohibition was an exercise of the Court's original rather than appellate jurisdiction.
- After Whybrow the Parliament amended the Conciliation and Arbitration Act in an attempt to prevent the High Court from granting prohibition against the Arbitration Court.
- Tramways case, (1914): in which the High Court considered the effect of the amendment. The Court refused to overrule Whybrow and held that the amendments to s 31 were not effective to remove the constitutional availability of prohibition and mandamus.
- R v Hibble; Ex parte BHP (1921): the High Court held that prohibition lies under s 75(v) of the constitution in relation to jurisdictional error.
- R v Hickman; Ex parte Fox and Clinton (1945): the High Court again considered the nature of prohibition and held that prohibition lies under s 75(v) of the constitution in relation to jurisdictional error.
- Kirk v Industrial Court of NSW (2010): the High Court held that State Parliaments cannot prevent State Supreme Courts from issuing prerogative relief for jurisdictional error.
