= 1913 Australian referendum (Corporations) =

Australian Corporations referendum, 1913
- 31 May 1913
- Do you approve of the proposed law for the alteration of the Constitution entitled — "Constitution Alteration (Corporations) 1912" ?

Results
Choice	Votes	%
Yes	960,711	49.33%
No	986,824	50.67%
Valid votes	1,947,535	95.90%
Invalid or blank votes	83,235	4.10%
Total votes	2,030,770	100.00%
Registered voters/turnout	2,760,216	73.57%

The Constitution Alteration (Corporations) Bill 1912, was an unsuccessful proposal to alter the Australian Constitution to extend the Commonwealth legislative power in respect to corporations that was put to voters for approval in a referendum held in 1913.

== Question ==
Do you approve of the proposed law for the alteration of the Constitution entitled "Constitution Alteration (Corporations) 1912"?

== Proposed Changes to the Constituation ==
The proposal was to alter the text of section 51 of the Constitution to read as follows: (removed text stricken through; substituted text in bold)

51. The Parliament shall, subject to this Constitution, have Legislative power to make laws for the peace, order, and good government of the Commonwealth with respect to:

(xx.) ~~Foreign corporations, and trading or financial corporations formed within the limits of the Commonwealth:~~

Corporations, including

(a) the creation, dissolution, regulation, and control of corporations;
(b) corporations formed under the law of a State, including their dissolution, regulation, and control; but not including municipal or governmental corporations, or any corporation formed solely for religious, charitable, scientific, or artistic purposes, and not for the acquisition of gain by the, corporation or its members; and
(c) foreign corporations, including their regulation and control:

== Results ==
Result (Note: Handbook of the 44th Parliament (2014) "Part 5 - Referendums and Plebiscites - Referendum results". Parliamentary Library of Australia.)
State	Electoral roll	Ballots issued	For		Against		Informal
State	Electoral roll	Ballots issued	Vote	%	Vote	%	Informal
New South Wales	1,036,187	717,855	317,668	46.79	361,255	**53.21**	37,676
Victoria	830,391	626,861	298,479	49.14	308,915	**50.86**	19,139
Queensland	363,082	280,525	146,936	**54.31**	123,632	45.69	9,736
South Australia	244,026	195,463	96,309	**51.34**	91,273	48.66	7,664
Western Australia	179,784	132,149	66,595	**52.84**	59,445	47.16	5,776
Tasmania	106,746	80,398	34,724	45.08	42,304	**54.92**	3,244
Total for Commonwealth	2,760,216	2,033,251	960,711	49.33	986,824	**50.67**	83,235
Results	Obtained majority in three states and an overall minority of 26,113 votes. **Not carried**						

== Discussion ==
The 1911 referendum asked a single question that dealt with trade and commerce, corporations and industrial matters. This resolution separated each of those matters into a different question. Like its forebear, none of these resolutions were carried. On each of the many occasions a similar question was asked at a referendum the public decided not to vest power in the Commonwealth over these matters.

- 1911 referendum on trade and commerce

== See also ==
- Huddart, Parker & Co Pty Ltd v Moorehead
- Politics of Australia
- History of Australia
