= R v Associated Northern Collieries =

Judgement of the High Court of Australia

- Court: High Court of Australia
- Full case name: The King and the Attorney-General of the Commonwealth v The Associated Northern Collieries and others
- Decided: 22 December 1911
- Citations: [1911] HCA 73, (1911) 14 CLR 387

Case history
- Prior action: Huddart, Parker & Co Pty Ltd v Moorehead (1909) 8 CLR 330
- Subsequent action: Melbourne Steamship Co Ltd v Moorehead (1912) 15 CLR 333

Court membership
- Judge sitting: Isaacs J

Case opinions
- I convict the defendants, and each and every of them, of the several offences severally found against them respectively as above stated.

Laws applied
- Overruled by
- Adelaide Steamship Co Ltd v The King [1912] HCA 58, (1912) 15 CLR 65

R v Associated Northern Collieries (the Coal-Vend Case) is a decision of the High Court of Australia concerning the activities of the Coal-Vend cartel. The convictions entered by Isaacs J in this decision were later set aside by the Full Court (Griffith CJ, Barton and O'Connor JJ) in Adelaide Steamship Co Ltd v The King.

== Decision ==
Following a trial in the original jurisdiction of the High Court, Isaacs J convicted each of the 40 defendants (16 individuals, 22 corporations and 2 commercial trusts) of cartel offences against the Australian Industries Preservation Act, a (now repealed) antitrust law based on the United States' Sherman Act.

== Political context ==
The trial was eagerly followed in the news media. Newspapers such as the Sydney Morning Herald regularly reported on the daily course of the trial.

== See also ==
- Huddart, Parker & Co Pty Ltd v Moorehead (1909) 8 CLR 330
- Melbourne Steamship Co Ltd v Moorehead (1912) 15 CLR 333
