= Isabel Mary Mitchell =

Australian author (1893–1973)

Isabel Mary Mitchell MBE (1893–1973) was an Australian known for her services to literature. She went blind in the 1940s and wrote about this in "Uncharted country [braille] : aspects of life in blindness." She wrote eight novels after losing her sight through the use of dictaphone and typewriter.

Mitchell also wrote three detective novels under the name Josephine Plain. The Secret of the Sandbank was first published in the Melbourne afternoon daily newspaper The Herald in instalments.

Mitchell was made a Member of the Order of the British Empire in 1970 for service to literature.

== Selected works ==
- Mitchell, Mary (1934), A Warning to Wantons:A Fantastic Romance Setting Forth the Not Undeserved but Awful Fate Which Befell a Minx, Doubleday Doran
- Mitchell, Mary (1935), The Secret of the Sandbank, Thornton Butterworth
- Mitchell, Mary (1935), The Secret of the Snows, Thornton Butterworth
- Plain, Josephine (1936), The Pazenger Problem, London Thornton Butterworth Ltd

== Family ==
She was the daughter of Edward Fancourt Mitchell. She was the sister of Janet Charlotte Mitchell and Agnes Eliza Fraser Mitchell, who wrote as Nancy Adams.
