= R v Licensing Court of Brisbane; Ex parte Daniell =

Judgement of the High Court of Australia

- Court: High Court of Australia
- Decided: 22 April 1920
- Citations: [1920] HCA 24, (1920) 28 CLR 23

Court membership
- Judges sitting: Knox CJ, Isaacs, Higgins, Gavan Duffy, Powers, Rich and Starke JJ

Case opinions
- (6:1) The Commonwealth and Queensland laws were inconsistent because of the impossibility of simultaneous obedience (per Knox CJ, Isaacs, Gavan Duffy, Powers, Rich & Starke JJ; Higgins J dissenting)

R v Licensing Court of Brisbane; Ex parte Daniell is a High Court of Australia case about inconsistency between Commonwealth and State legislation, which is dealt with by s 109 of the Australian Constitution. It is the leading example of what is known as the impossibility of simultaneous obedience test.

== Background ==
Section 166 of the Liquor Act 1912 (Qld) stated that a State referendum on liquor trading hours was to be held on the same day as the Senate elections. However, section 14 of the Commonwealth Electoral (Wartime) Act 1917 (Cth) forbid electors from voting at a State referendum or vote on the same day as the Senate elections, which were held on 5 May 1917.

== The decision ==
It was held that there was an inconsistency between the Queensland and Commonwealth Acts, and thus the State law, to the extent of the inconsistency, is invalid. It is an example of impossibility of simultaneous obedience because had State officials obeyed the State law by conducting the State referendum on 5 May 1917, they would have contravened the Commonwealth law forbidding such an occurrence.

== See also ==
- Section 109 of the Australian Constitution
- Australian constitutional law
