= Section 109 of the Constitution of Australia =

Interaction between federal and state law

Section 109 of the Constitution of Australia is the part of the Constitution of Australia that deals with the legislative inconsistency between federal and state laws, and declares that valid federal laws override ("shall prevail") inconsistent state laws, to the extent of the inconsistency. Section 109 is analogous to the Supremacy Clause in the United States Constitution and the paramountcy doctrine in Canadian constitutional jurisprudence, and the jurisprudence in one jurisdiction is considered persuasive in the others.

== Text ==
Section 109 of the Constitution of Australia provides that:

When a law of a State is inconsistent with a law of the Commonwealth, the latter shall prevail, and the former shall, to the extent of the inconsistency, be invalid.

Section 109, together with section 5 of the Commonwealth of Australia Constitution Act 1900 (which is not part of the Australian Constitution) have been considered to be the foundation for the existence of the judicial review power in Australia. The section provides:

5. This Act, and all laws made by the Parliament of the Commonwealth under the Constitution, shall be binding on the courts, judges, and people of every State and of every part of the Commonwealth, notwithstanding anything in the laws of any State...

"Invalidity of a State law" does not mean that the state law is invalid in the positivist sense that the state parliament lacks power to pass it. The state law, though enacted with full procedural validity, merely ceases to have operative force. Hence, in order for section 109 to come into operation at all, there must be a valid state law and a valid Commonwealth law. When section 109 takes effect, the state law yields to the Commonwealth law, but remains a valid law of the parliament which enacted it. The practical significance of this will become apparent if, at some later date, the over-riding Commonwealth law ceases to operate. This effect applies also to laws passed by a state (i.e., while it was a colony) prior to the establishment of the Australian Constitution as well as those passed by a state after the Commonwealth had passed a relevant law.

== History of approach ==
The High Court of Australia in D'Emden v Pedder (1904), in the first substantial constitutional case presented before the court, cited and drew on the jurisprudence of the United States case of McCulloch v. Maryland, recognising that the case was not binding. Following the reasoning in the American case, the court adopted the doctrine of implied intergovernmental immunities.

In the Engineers Case (1920), the High Court of Australia swept away the earlier doctrines of implied intergovernmental immunities and reserved State powers, firmly establishing the modern basis for the legal understanding of federalism in Australia. The Court also rejected the use of American precedent and said that they would apply the settled rules of construction giving primacy to the text of the Constitution, anchoring interpretation in its express words. In 2003, former Chief Justice of Australia Sir Anthony Mason wrote:

The combination of literal interpretation and a broad construction of Commonwealth powers led to the Commonwealth assuming a dominant position in the Australian federation vis-a-vis the states. The Engineers Case ushered in a period of literal interpretation of the Constitution. Literal interpretation and legalism (of which Sir John Latham was the chief exponent) were characteristic of the Court's constitutional interpretation for the greater part of the 20th century.

In conjunction with the doctrine outlined in the Engineers Case, it has also significantly extended the reach of Federal legislative power in Australia.

== Approach to interpretation ==
The evolution of High Court doctrine in s. 109 cases has led to three broad approaches to determine when there is inconsistency:

- is it impossible to obey both laws? (the "simultaneous obedience" test)
- does one law confer a right which the other purports to take away? (the "conferred rights" test)
- does the federal law cover the field in question? (the "cover the field" test)

The first two tests, and in particular the first, are said to involve direct inconsistency, while the third test is said to be one involving indirect inconsistency.

=== Impossible to obey both laws ===
Instances may arise when it is impossible to obey two laws simultaneously. A classical example is R v Licensing Court of Brisbane; Ex parte Daniell. A state referendum on liquor trading hours was fixed by State law for the same day as a federal Senate election. The Commonwealth law provided that a State referendum could not be held on that day. It was held that the State law, to the extent of the inconsistency, was invalid. As Isaacs J. observed:

But the position is much stronger here, where there is a prohibition coming, not from the Act itself, but ab extra — from the Act of a Parliament which must be treated as paramount. The State Act operates not through the Federal Act or Constitution, but by virtue of the State Constitution; and it is valid in all respects except so far as the Federal Act and Constitution obstruct it. If the Federal Act, in place of merely forbidding the poll and prescribing penalties for the taking of the poll, had said that no reduction of licences should result from an affirmative poll, it would seem that there could be no reduction; but it has not said so.

=== One law confers a right which the other purports to take away ===
In some situations, one law may purport to confer a legal right, privilege or entitlement, while another law purports to take away or diminish some right or entitlement. In other words, one law says that you can do X, the other that you cannot do X. For example, the Commonwealth provision in Colvin v Bradley Brothers Pty Ltd affirmed that employers in certain industries could employ women to work on certain machines whilst the State provision made it an offence to do so. It was not impossible to obey both laws, since nothing in the Commonwealth law required the employment of females. This type of inconsistency may require a working-out of the actual effect of both laws in an individual case. Because of this, it could require a more subtle analysis than test 1. Similar reasoning was later used in Telstra v Worthing, in discussing conflicting workers' compensation laws, and in Bell Group v Western Australia, where a Western Australia Act that sought to accelerate the dissolution and administration of the Bell Group was held to conflict with the Commonwealth's income tax laws.

Chief Justice Knox and Justice Gavan Duffy agreed in Clyde Engineering Co Ltd v Cowburn that a simple test of logical contradiction was "not sufficient or even appropriate in every case", and enunciated this test: where one statute confers a right, and the other takes away the right, even if the right may be waived or abandoned, there is an inconsistency, whereupon the State law would then be invalid to the extent of the inconsistency.

=== Covering the field ===
It may happen that the Commonwealth law evinces a legislative intention to "cover the field". In such a case there need not be any direct contradiction between the two enactments. What is imputed to the Commonwealth Parliament is a legislative intention that its law shall be all the law there is on that topic. In that event, what is "inconsistent" with the Commonwealth law is the existence of any State law at all on that topic.

The "cover the field" test must be implemented in three steps:

- a finding as to the field or subject matter regulated by the Commonwealth Act,
- a determination as to whether the Commonwealth law intended to regulate that subject matter completely, and
- a determination as to whether the State law interferes with or intrudes upon the field covered by the Commonwealth law.

Questions 1 and 2 can be problematic as they frequently depend on a subjective assessment of the scope and operation of a Commonwealth law. In the absence of express intention, the Court will look to a variety of factors, such as the subject-matter of the law and whether for the law to achieve its purpose it is necessary that it be a complete statement of the law on that topic.

This test involves a more indirect form of inconsistency and makes s 109 a much more powerful instrument for ensuring the supremacy of Commonwealth law.

It had first been suggested by Isaacs J in 1910 in Australian Boot Trade Employees Federation v Whybrow. Justice Dixon had foreshadowed a similar test in 1920 when appearing for the Commonwealth in Commonwealth v Queensland. This test received its first clear formulation in Clyde Engineering Co Ltd v Cowburn by Justice Isaacs. In that case, by covering the field, Isaacs was able to ensure the supremacy of the Commonwealth system.

The "cover the field" test became fully authoritative when Justice Dixon adopted it in Ex parte McLean, stating:

Close consideration of the reasons given by Isaacs, Rich and Starke JJ. in Clyde Engineering Co Ltd v Cowburn shows that the view upon which they acted in that case and applied afterwards in H. V. McKay Pty. Ltd. v. Hunt was substantially that the Constitution empowered the Parliament to give and that Parliament had given the award this exclusive authority. The view there taken, when analyzed, appears to consist of the following steps, namely:

1. The power of the Parliament to make laws with respect to conciliation and arbitration for the prevention and settlement of industrial disputes extending beyond the limits of any one State enables the Parliament to authorize awards which, in establishing the relations of the disputants, disregard the provisions and the policy of the State law;
2. the Commonwealth Conciliation and Arbitration Act confers such a power upon the tribunal, which may therefore settle the rights and duties of the parties to a dispute in disregard of those prescribed by State law, which thereupon are superseded
3. sec. 109 gives paramountcy to the Federal statute so empowering the tribunal, with the result that State law cannot validly operate where the tribunal has exercised its authority to determine a dispute in disregard of the State regulation.

In practice, the three tests overlap. For example, in Commercial Radio Coffs Harbour v Fuller, the finding that there was no inconsistency between Federal and State laws depended on all three tests. In doing so, the reasoning by Mason J. in Ansett Transport Industries (Operations) Pty Ltd v Wardley was affirmed:

If, according to the true construction of the Commonwealth law, the right is absolute, then it inevitably follows that the right is intended to prevail to the exclusion of any other law. A State law which takes away the right is inconsistent because it is in conflict with the absolute right and because the Commonwealth law relevantly occupies the field. So also with a Commonwealth law that grants a permission by way of positive authority. The Commonwealth legislative intention which sustains the conclusion that the permission is granted by way of positive authority also sustains the conclusion that the positive authority was to take effect to the exclusion of any other law. Again it produces inconsistency on both grounds: cf. Airlines of NSW Pty Ltd v New South Wales (No 2) , where the permission for which Commonwealth law provided was neither absolute nor comprehensive.

=== Clearing the field ===
The Commonwealth can avoid covering a legislative "field" by passing an express provision declaring its intention not to do so. This means in practice that the Commonwealth can control the operation of s.109 in a negative way by making it clear that related State laws are to operate concurrently with the Commonwealth law. The leading case is R v Credit Tribunal; Ex parte General Motors Acceptance Corporation, where Mason J. noted:

28. The judgments to which I have referred make the point that although a provision in a Commonwealth statute which attempts to deny operational validity to a State law cannot of its own force achieve that object, it may nevertheless validly evince an intention on the part of the statute to make exhaustive or exclusive provision on the subject with which it deals, thereby bringing s. 109 into play. Equally a Commonwealth law may provide that it is not intended to make exhaustive or exclusive provision with respect to the subject with which it deals, thereby enabling State laws, not inconsistent with Commonwealth law, to have an operation. Here again the Commonwealth law does not of its own force give State law a valid operation. All that it does is to make it clear that the Commonwealth law is not intended to cover the field, thereby leaving room for the operation of such State laws as do not conflict with Commonwealth law.

29. It is of course by now well established that a provision in a Commonwealth statute evincing an intention that the statute is not intended to cover the field cannot avoid or eliminate a case of direct inconsistency or collision, of the kind which arises, for example, when Commonwealth and State laws make contradictory provision upon the same topic, making it impossible for both laws to be obeyed. In Reg. v. Loewenthal; Ex parte Blacklock..., I pointed out that such a provision in a Commonwealth law cannot displace the operation of s. 109 in rendering the State law inoperative. But where there is no direct inconsistency, where inconsistency can only arise if the Commonwealth law is intended to be an exhaustive and exclusive law, a provision of the kind under consideration will be effective to avoid inconsistency by making it clear that the law is not intended to be exhaustive or exclusive.

== See also ==
- Supremacy Clause—analogous provision in the United States Constitution
- Paramountcy doctrine used in Canadian constitutional jurisprudence
- Rule according to higher law
