= 1919 Australian referendum (Legislative Powers) =

Unsuccessful proposal to temporarily expand Commonwealth power

Australian Legislative Powers referendum, 1919
19 December 1919
- Do you approve of the proposed law for the alteration of the Constitution entitled — "Constitution Alteration (Legislative Powers) 1919" ?
- Outcome: Amendment Failed

Results
Choice	Votes	%
Yes	911,357	49.65%
No	924,160	50.35%
Valid votes	1,835,517	90.38%
Invalid or blank votes	195,394	9.62%
Total votes	2,030,911	100.00%
Registered voters/turnout	2,849,862	71.26%

The Constitution Alteration (Legislative Powers) Bill 1919, was an unsuccessful proposal to alter the Australian Constitution to temporarily extend Commonwealth legislative powers with respect to trade and commerce, corporations, industrial matters and trusts that was put to voters for approval in a referendum held in 1919. If approved, the amendments would have operated for a maximum of 3 years. The 1919 referendum was held in conjunction with the 1919 federal election.

== Question ==
Do you approve of the proposed law for the alteration of the Constitution entitled 'Constitution Alteration (Legislative Powers) 1919'?

== Results ==
Result (Note: Handbook of the 44th Parliament (2014) "Part 5 - Referendums and Plebiscites - Referendum results". Parliamentary Library of Australia.)
State	Electoral roll	Ballots issued	For		Against		Informal
State	Electoral roll	Ballots issued	Vote	%	Vote	%	Informal
New South Wales	1,079,439	717,565	259,751	39.95	390,450	60.05	67,132
Victoria	837,408	638,098	369,210	64.65	201,869	35.35	66,227
Queensland	389,200	330,231	175,225	57.35	130,299	42.65	24,397
South Australia	268,235	178,092	40,520	25.28	119,789	74.72	17,656
Western Australia	163,544	103,235	48,142	51.75	44,892	48.25	9,854
Tasmania	112,036	65,716	18,509	33.43	36,861	66.57	10,128
Total for Commonwealth	2,849,862	2,032,937	911,357	49.65	924,160	50.35	195,394
Results	Obtained majority in three states and an overall minority of 12,803 votes. Not carried						
