= No liability =

A no-liability company in Australia (suffix NL) is a company which, under the Corporations Act 2001 (Cth), must have as its stated objects that it is solely a mining company and that it is not entitled to calls on the unpaid issue price of shares. It is a company which is restricted to mining activities and is the only sort of corporation which is entitled to this form of liability, given the sometimes financially risky business of mining. Most of the usual rules in the Act apply to no-liability companies, save that a mining company must adopt a constitution which states their objects as mining.

No-liability companies should not be confused with the concept of limited liability.

No-liability companies are differentiated from other companies as their shareholders are not liable to pay calls on unpaid shares. This differs from traditional company structure where the purchase of shares is a binding contract. Should the shareholder choose not to pay when there is a call, the shareholder forfeits both the unpaid and paid shares. This encourages investment in potentially risky mining ventures, as a shareholder with unpaid shares can choose to withdraw from the company with no legal consequences. A successful mining company usually converts to a limited liability company when advantageous.

== Forfeiture ==
Shares upon which calls had not been paid were forfeit and offered for sale by auction after 14 days. Former owners could redeem their forfeited shares by paying the call and perhaps a fee to cover expenses.

== Company names ==
Early on in the life of the No Liability system, such companies were identified as

- ABC Mining (registered)

Then the "No Liability" tag took over, such as

- ABC Mining (no liability)
- DEF Mining no liability

And finally

- GHI Mining N.L.

The word "mining" does not have to appear in the name of the company. Oil exploration is a form of mining.

- Poseidon NL

== Timeline ==
- No Liability companies were introduced at a time when there were six colonies, and therefore six sets of laws.
- 1845 – South Australian Mining Association was founded as a "no responsibility" (with the same meaning) company.
- 1869 – no liability companies introduced in Victoria
- 1877 – No-liability Mining Companies Bill introduced in New South Wales
- 1895 – No-liability Mining Companies Bill; in New South Wales

== Conversions ==
Ordinary mining and exploration companies could convert to No Liability status, subject to approval of shareholders and approval of creditors. This was particularly useful when NL status was first introduced.

No Liability companies which discovered a payable deposit of ore would normally convert to Limited status as this facilitated the financing of that mine.

== Stock exchange ==
Companies in Australia listed on the ASX have a three-character symbol. NL companies may have more than one class of contributing shares. A typical set of symbols might be:

- XYZ – fully paid
- XYZCA – contributing shares class A
- XYZCB – contributing shares class B

The code does not distinguish between No Liability companies and ordinary companies, only the full company name does that.
