= 1926 Australian referendum =

The 1926 Australian referendum was held on 4 September 1926. It contained two referendum questions.

Results (Note: Handbook of the 44th Parliament (2014) "Part 5 - Referendums and Plebiscites - Referendum results". Parliamentary Library of Australia.)
Question	NSW	Vic	Qld	SA	WA	Tas	States in favour	Voters in favour	Result
(14) Industry and Commerce	Yes	No	Yes	No	No	No	2:4	43.5%	Not carried
(15) Essential Services	Yes	No	Yes	No	No	No	2:4	42.8%	Not carried

== Results in detail ==
=== Industry and Commerce ===
Question: Do you approve of the proposed law for the alteration of the Constitution entitled 'Constitution Alteration (Industry and Commerce) 1926'?

Result
State	Electoral roll	Ballots issued	For		Against		Informal
State	Electoral roll	Ballots issued	Vote	%	Vote	%	Informal
New South Wales	1,241,635	1,131,656	566,973	51.53	533,284	48.47	31,399
Victoria	968,861	888,661	310,261	36.23	546,138	63.77	32,262
Queensland	440,632	399,664	202,691	52.10	186,374	47.90	10,599
South Australia	303,054	281,492	78,983	29.32	190,396	70.68	12,113
Western Australia	190,286	164,555	46,469	29.29	112,185	70.71	5,901
Tasmania	110,484	98,356	41,711	44.86	51,278	55.14	5,367
Total for Commonwealth	3,254,952	2,964,384	1,247,088	43.50	1,619,655	56.50	97,641
Results	Obtained majority in two states and an overall minority of 372,567 votes. Not carried						

This section is an excerpt from 1926 Australian referendum (Industry and Commerce) § Results

=== Essential Services ===
Question: Do you approve of the proposed law for the alteration of the Constitution entitled 'Constitution Alteration (Essential Services) 1926'?

Result
State	Electoral roll	Ballots issued	For		Against		Informal
State	Electoral roll	Ballots issued	Vote	%	Vote	%	Informal
New South Wales	1,241,635	1,131,656	545,270	50.39	536,734	49.61	49,652
Victoria	968,861	888,661	296,548	35.55	537,560	64.45	54,553
Queensland	440,632	399,664	188,473	50.56	184,320	49.44	26,871
South Australia	303,054	281,492	81,966	31.32	179,740	68.68	19,786
Western Australia	190,286	164,555	39,566	25.90	113,222	74.10	11,767
Tasmania	110,484	98,356	43,679	48.59	46,217	51.41	8,460
Total for Commonwealth	3,254,952	2,964,384	1,195,502	42.80	1,597,793	57.20	171,089
Results	Obtained majority in two states and an overall minority of 402,291 votes. Not carried						

This section is an excerpt from 1926 Australian referendum (Essential Services) § Results

== See also ==
- Referendums in Australia
- Politics of Australia
- History of Australia
