= 1913 Australian referendum (Trade and Commerce) =

1913 Australian Trade and Commerce referendum
- 31 May 1913
- Do you approve of the proposed law for the alteration of the Constitution entitled — "Constitution Alteration (Trade and Commerce) 1912" ?

Results
Choice	Votes	%
Yes	958,419	49.38%
No	982,615	50.62%
Valid votes	1,941,034	95.58%
Invalid or blank votes	89,736	4.42%
Total votes	2,030,770	100.00%
Registered voters/turnout	2,760,216	73.57%

The Constitution Alteration (Trade and Commerce) Bill 1912, was an unsuccessful referendum held in 1913 that sought to alter the Australian Constitution to extend Commonwealth legislative power in respect to trade and commerce.

== Issues ==
The "Yes" Case

- The trade and commerce power is the keystone of the powers of the federal parliament. The present limitation to inter-state trade and commerce paralyses the parliament's action in almost every direction.
- The present division of the trade and commerce power between federation and states is artificial, indefinite, illogical and mischievous.
- Trade and commerce are national matters and state laws are not adequate.

The "No" Case

- If passed, this proposal will vest in the federal government the control of all business within the Commonwealth. This will mean that the centralised government will dominate all trade and commerce, including that which is carried on within state borders.
- The proposal will lead to a great deal of legal uncertainty and will no doubt be challenged in the High Court.
- The new power will enable the federal parliament to pass legislation which will profoundly disturb trade and commerce within the states.

== Question ==
Do you approve of the proposed law for the alteration of the Constitution entitled 'Constitution Alteration (Trade and Commerce) 1912'?

== Proposed Changes to the Constitution ==
The proposal was to alter the text of section 51 of the Constitution to read as follows: (removed text stricken through; substituted text in bold)

51. The Parliament shall, subject to this Constitution, have Legislative power to make laws for the peace, order, and good government of the Commonwealth with respect to:

(i.) Trade and commerce ~~with other countries, and among the States~~ but not including trade and commerce upon railways the property of a State, except so far as it is trade and commerce with other countries or among the States:

== Results ==
The referendum was not approved by a majority of voters, and a majority of the voters was achieved in only three states.

Result
State	Electoral roll	Ballots issued	For		Against		Informal
State	Electoral roll	Ballots issued	Votes	%	Votes	%	Informal
New South Wales	1,036,187	717,855	317,848	46.93	359,418	**53.07**	39,333
Victoria	830,391	626,861	297,290	49.12	307,975	**50.88**	21,268
Queensland	363,082	280,525	146,187	**54.34**	122,813	45.66	11,304
South Australia	244,026	195,463	96,085	**51.32**	91,144	48.68	8,017
Western Australia	179,784	132,149	66,349	**52.86**	59,181	47.14	6,286
Tasmania	106,746	80,398	34,660	45.16	42,084	**54.84**	3,528
Total for Commonwealth	2,760,216	2,033,251	958,419	49.38	982,615	**50.62**	89,736
Results	Obtained majority in three states and an overall minority of 24,196 votes. **Not carried**						

== Discussion ==
The 1911 referendum asked a single question that dealt with trade and commerce, corporations and industrial matters. This resolution separated each of those matters into a different question. Like its forebear, none of these resolutions were carried. On each of the many occasions a similar question was asked at a referendum the public decided not to vest power in the Commonwealth over these matters. However, although many at the time felt strongly about the need for the Commonwealth to have limited control over commerce between the states, the High Court eventually gave much of the power to Commonwealth indirectly through later decisions, thus effectively removing the need for the Constitution to be changed anyway.

- 1911 referendum on trade and commerce

== See also ==
- Politics of Australia
- History of Australia
