= Clyde Engineering Co Ltd v Cowburn =

High court of Australia case

- Court: High Court of Australia
- Decided: 19 April 1926
- Citations: [1926] HCA 6, (1926) 37 CLR 466

Case history
- Prior action: none
- Subsequent action: none

Court membership
- Judges sitting: Knox CJ, Isaacs, Higgins, Gavan Duffy, Powers, Rich and StarkeJJ

Case opinions
- (5:2) The New South Wales Act was held to be inconsistent with the Commonwealth award (per Knox CJ, Gavan Duffy, Isaacs, Rich & Starke JJ; Higgins & Powers JJ dissenting)

Clyde Engineering Co Ltd v Cowburn, is a High Court of Australia case about inconsistency between a Commonwealth and a State law, which is dealt with in s 109 of the Australian Constitution. It contains classic statements of the denial of rights test and the covering the field test for inconsistency.

== Background ==
The Forty-Four Hours Week Act 1925 (NSW) provided that workers under a Commonwealth award which stipulated a working week longer than 44 hours should be paid their full wages if they had worked for 44 hours. Cowburn was an employee of Clyde Engineering, and worked a 44-hour week. However, the Commonwealth award stated that a worker who performed less than 48 hours of work should have pay deducted for non-attendance.

== The decision ==
Knox CJ and Gavan Duffy J noted that the impossibility of obedience test (see R v Licensing Court of Brisbane; Ex parte Daniell) may not be appropriate in all circumstances. They formulated a new test: where one statute confers a right, and the other takes away the right, even if the right may be waived or abandoned, there is an inconsistency, whereupon the State law would then be invalid to the extent of the inconsistency. Isaacs and Rich JJ agreed with Knox CJ and Gavan Duffy J regarding the denial of rights test. This test was re-stated by Dixon J in Victoria v Commonwealth: "When a State law, if valid, would alter, impair or detract from the operation of a law of the Commonwealth Parliament, then to that extent it is invalid."

Isaacs and Starke JJ also concluded an inconsistency based on the covering the field test. An inconsistency may arise where the Commonwealth law, expressly or impliedly, intends to cover the field completely, and supersede or exclude any other laws in that area. If the State law then enters that field, or the part of the field covered by the Commonwealth law, then the State law will be inconsistent, even though it may be possible to obey both laws simultaneously.

== See also ==
- Australian constitutional law
- Section 109 of the Australian Constitution
