= Jumbunna Coal Mine NL v Victorian Coal Miners' Association =

Judgement of the High Court of Australia

- Court: High Court of Australia
- Full case name: Jumbunna Coal Mine NL v Victorian Coal Miners' Association
- Decided: 6 October 1908
- Citations: [1908] HCA 95, (1908) 6 CLR 309

Case history
- Prior action: Commonwealth Court of Conciliation and Arbitration reported in (1908) 6 CLR 309 per Higgins P.

Court membership
- Judges sitting: Griffith CJ, Barton, O'Connor & Isaacs JJ

Jumbunna Coal Mine NL v Victorian Coal Miners' Association is a landmark Australian judgment of the High Court. The matter related to the Commonwealth Government's power to make laws for the conciliation and arbitration of interstate industrial disputes under subsection 51(xxxv) of the Australian Constitution and the incidental power under subsection 51(xxxix), but in reaching a decision set principles on matters of statutory interpretation affecting the Constitution.

== Background ==
Following strike action across Australia and New Zealand in the 1890s, the Constitution had been drafted to allow the federal government to make laws about the conciliation and arbitration of industrial disputes, but only where such disputes went beyond state boundaries. In 1903 there was industrial action in the Victorian coalfields which lasted for 70 weeks, initially at Outtrim, Victoria before spreading to the nearby Jumbunna Coal Mine in Victoria.

Subsequently, the Victorian Coal Miners' Association sought to be registered as a union under the Conciliation and Arbitration Act 1904. The two coal mining employers affected by the strike, Jumbunna Coal Mine NL and Outtrim, Howitt and British Consolidated Coal Co NL. The Industrial Registrar decided to register the union and the two companies applied to have the registration annulled and presented two arguments, that a union could not be involved in an industrial dispute beyond one state when its membership was only from one State and the provisions that allowed the union's registration were constitutionally ultra vires.

== Decision of the Commonwealth Court of Conciliation and Arbitration ==
In the Commonwealth Court of Conciliation and Arbitration the application for review was heard by H. B. Higgins. (Note: H.B. Higgins heard the application in his capacity as President of the Commonwealth Court of Conciliation and Arbitration. While his Honour was a judge of the High Court and his judgement that was the subject of the appeal is included in the law report, he did not sit on the appeal to the High Court.) His Honour rejected the companies argument that an interstate industrial dispute could not occur unless an employer carried on business in at least two states and . From this decision the two companies then appealed to the High Court. The union did not appear on the appeal in the High Court, however the Industrial Registrar was represented.

== Finding in the High Court ==
Each of the judges of the High Court of Australia gave separate judgements however all judges agreed as to the result.

The court held that a union that was limited to one state could be a party to an industrial dispute that extended beyond that state. Griffith CJ held that an industrial dispute could extend beyond one state by organizations of different States in temporary alliance for a common purpose. Barton J similarly held that disputants in different States may make common cause to defend a common interest.

The court ruled that for a law to be valid pursuant to sub-section 51(xxxix) as incidental to another head of power, such a law depends on its ends to be legitimate and the law must be appropriate and adaptable to that end. Because the provisions of the Conciliation and Arbitration Act 1904 were a legitimate means of achieving the ends set out in the head of power under sub-section 51(xxxv) of the Constitution they were therefore incidental to that power and were therefore valid laws. Griffith CJ held that the Parliament is unfettered in its choice of means, provided that they are really incidental to the attainment of these ends, and not manifestly unconnected with them. Both Barton J and O'Connor J cited with approval the decision of the Supreme Court of the United States in McCulloch v. Maryland including "Let the end be legitimate, let it be within the scope of the Constitution, and all means which are appropriate, which are plainly adapted to that end, which are not prohibited, but consistent with the letter and spirit of the Constitution are constitutional.”

In reaching this decision the court held that in matters where there are variable interpretations, the Court should assume that the intention of Parliament was that the statute would not exceed the constitutional power. O'Connor J held that "In the interpretation of general words in a Statute there is always a presumption that the legislature does not intend to exceed its jurisdiction" and that "… every statute is to be interpreted and applied so far as its language admits so as not to be inconsistent with the comity of nations or with the established rules of international law".
