= Alexander Morrison (headmaster) =

Scottish-Australian educator, headmaster of Scotch College

- Born: 3 February 1829; Moray, Scotland
- Died: 31 May 1903 (aged 74); Melbourne, Australia
- Occupations: Educator, headmaster
- Spouse: Christina Morrison née Fraser (m. 1855)
- Children: 7 (4 sons, 3 daughters)

Alexander Morrison (3 February 1829 – 31 May 1903) was a Scottish-born educator who was the headmaster of the Scotch College (Melbourne) for 47 years.

== Early life and education ==
Morrison first taught in Scottish institutions in Moray, Scotland, and later at the Elgin Academy, King's College, and the University of Aberdeen. He began teaching at Elgin Academy three years after graduating, later becoming rector of St John's Grammar School, Hamilton for three years. During this period, enrolment at the school doubled from 194 to 397.

In 1855, Morrison married Christina Fraser. The following year, after the resignation of the inaugural headmaster, Robert Lawson, Morrison accepted the position of headmaster at Scotch College. He emigrated aboard the Essex with his wife, son, and younger brother Robert (who later became vice-principal at Scotch College from 1869 to 1904). They arrived in Melbourne on 25 July 1857, and Morrison began his duties the following month.

== Career in Australia ==
The University of Aberdeen conferred on Morrison the honorary degree of Doctor of Laws in 1876. He was the author of A First Latin Course.

== Legacy ==
Morrison had a 47-year tenure at Scotch College (from 1857 until his death in 1903). In this period, the number of enrolled students grew significantly, and in 1870, a larger proportion passed university examinations than at any previous point in the college's history. Other masters included Weigall, Alexander Sutherland, and W. F. Ingram.

Morrison died from heart failure on 31 May 1903 in Melbourne. He was survived by four sons and three daughters.
