= 1926 Australian referendum (Industry and Commerce) =

Unsuccessful proposal to expand Commonwealth power on Industry and Commerce

1926 Australian Industry and Commerce referendum
4 September 1926
- Do you approve of the proposed law for the alteration of the Constitution entitled — "Constitution Alteration (Industry and Commerce) 1926" ?
- Outcome: Amendment Failed

Results
Choice	Votes	%
Yes	1,247,088	43.50%
No	1,619,655	56.50%
Valid votes	2,866,743	96.71%
Invalid or blank votes	97,641	3.29%
Total votes	2,964,384	100.00%
Registered voters/turnout	3,254,952	91.07%

The Constitution Alteration (Industry and Commerce) Bill 1926, was an unsuccessful proposal to alter the Australian Constitution to extend the Commonwealth legislative power in respect to corporations, and to give it the power to make laws with respect to trusts and combinations in restraint of trade, trade unions and employer associations. It was put to voters for approval in a referendum held on 4 September 1926.

== Question ==
Do you approve of the proposed law for the alteration of the Constitution entitled 'Constitution Alteration (Industry and Commerce) 1926'?

== Proposed Changes to the Constituation ==
The proposal was to alter section 51 of the Constitution as follows:

Section fifty-one of the Constitution is altered— industry and Commerce.

{a) by omitting from paragraph (xx.) the words “Foreign corporations, and trading or financial corporations formed within the limits of the Commonwealth ”, and inserting in their stead the words ‘‘Corporations, including—

(a) the creation, regulation, control and dissolution of corporations;
(b) the regulation, control and dissolution of corporations formed under the law of a State; and
(c) the regulation and control of foreign corporations; but not including municipal or governmental corporations, or any corporation formed solely for religious, charitable, scientific or artistic purposes, or any corporation not formed for the acquisition of gain by the corporation or its members ”;

(b) by omitting from paragraph (xxxv.) the words “ extending beyond the limits of any one State ”; and
(c) by inserting after paragraph (xxxix.) the following paragraphs:—

(xl.) Establishing authorities with such powers as the Parliament confers on them with respect to the regulation and determination of terms and conditions of industrial employment and of rights and duties of employers and employees with respect to industrial matters and things:
(xli.) Investing State authorities with any powers which the Parliament, by virtue of paragraph (Xxxv.) or paragraph (xl.) of this section, has vested or has power to vest in any authority established by the Commonwealth:
(xlii.) Trusts and combinations (whether composed of individuals or corporations or both) in restraint of trade, trade unions, and associations of employers or of employees for industrial purposes, including the formation, regulation control and dissolution thereof.

== Results ==
The referendum was not approved by a majority of voters, and a majority of the voters was achieved in only two states, New South Wales and Queensland. (Note: Handbook of the 44th Parliament (2014) "Part 5 - Referendums and Plebiscites - Referendum results". Parliamentary Library of Australia.)

Result
State	Electoral roll	Ballots issued	For		Against		Informal
State	Electoral roll	Ballots issued	Vote	%	Vote	%	Informal
New South Wales	1,241,635	1,131,656	566,973	51.53	533,284	48.47	31,399
Victoria	968,861	888,661	310,261	36.23	546,138	63.77	32,262
Queensland	440,632	399,664	202,691	52.10	186,374	47.90	10,599
South Australia	303,054	281,492	78,983	29.32	190,396	70.68	12,113
Western Australia	190,286	164,555	46,469	29.29	112,185	70.71	5,901
Tasmania	110,484	98,356	41,711	44.86	51,278	55.14	5,367
Total for Commonwealth	3,254,952	2,964,384	1,247,088	43.50	1,619,655	56.50	97,641
Results	Obtained majority in two states and an overall minority of 372,567 votes. Not carried						

== See also ==
- Referendums in Australia
- Politics of Australia
- History of Australia
