= Edward Fancourt Mitchell =

Australian barrister

Sir Edward Fancourt Mitchell KCMG KC (21 July 1855 – 7 May 1941) was an Australian barrister who was one of the leading experts in Australian constitutional law in the early part of the 20th century.

== Early life ==
Mitchell was born in Richmond, Surrey, England, the son of William Henry Fancourt Mitchell and the former Christina Templeton. His father, a long-serving member of the Victorian Legislative Council, had arrived in Australia in 1833; he was born on an extended visit home. Mitchell attended Geelong Grammar School and Melbourne Grammar School, and was then sent to England to attend Trinity Hall, Cambridge. He was called to the bar at the Inner Temple in 1881, but returned to Australia the same year and was also admitted to the Victorian Bar. He began his professional career as a junior to James Purves.

== Legal career ==
Mitchell by David Low

Mitchell eventually established his own practice, frequently appearing before the Supreme Court of Victoria. He also served as chairman of Goldsbrough Mort & Co. from 1893 to 1896. After Federation in 1901, Mitchell made regular appearances before the High Court and occasionally before the Judicial Committee of the Privy Council in London. He was appointed King's Counsel in 1904 and made a Knight Commander of the Order of St Michael and St George (KCMG) in 1918.

== Other interests ==
Mitchell was a keen sportsman. He played interstate tennis for Victoria in 1886 and 1887, and was a founding member of the Royal Melbourne Golf Club. He also represented Victoria on the Australian Cricket Board, and was president of the Melbourne Cricket Club from 1933 to 1941.

Mitchell was a devout Anglican, and served as chancellor of the Anglican Diocese of Melbourne from 1910 until his death. He was a supporter of the Nationalist Party, and in 1918 contested the preselection process for the Flinders by-election. He was defeated by Stanley Bruce, a future prime minister, and was apparently let down by his poor public speaking.

== Personal life ==
Mitchell married Eliza Fraser Morrison on 16 December 1886. He and his wife had four daughters. His third daughter was the blind novelist, Isabel Mary Mitchell. His father-in-law was the educationist Alexander Morrison, headmaster of Scotch College.
