= 1911 Australian referendum (Trade and Commerce) =

1911 Australian Trade and Commerce referendum
26 April 1911
- Do you approve of the proposed law for the alteration of the Constitution entitled — "Constitution Alteration (Legislative Powers) 1910" ?
- Outcome: Amendment Failed

Results
Choice	Votes	%
Yes	483,356	39.42%
No	742,704	60.58%
Valid votes	1,226,060	98.33%
Invalid or blank votes	20,869	1.67%
Total votes	1,246,929	100.00%
Registered voters/turnout	2,341,624	53.25%

The Constitution Alteration (Legislative Powers) Bill 1910, was put to voters for approval in a referendum held in the 1911 referendums. The bill sought to alter the Australian Constitution to extend the Commonwealth power in respect of trade and commerce, the control of corporations, labour and employment and combinations and monopolies. All of the proposed changes were contained within the one question.

== Question ==
Do you approve of the proposed law for the alteration of the Constitution entitled 'Constitution Alteration (Legislative Powers) 1910'?

== Proposed Changes to the Constitution ==
The proposal was to alter the text of section 51 of the Constitution to read as follows (removed text stricken through; substituted text in bold):

51. The Parliament shall, subject to this Constitution, have Legislative power to make laws for the peace, order, and good government of the Commonwealth with respect to:

(i.) Trade and commerce ~~with other countries, and among the States~~;
...
(xx.) ~~Foreign corporations, and trading or financial corporations formed within the limits of the Commonwealth:~~

Corporations, including

(a) the creation, dissolution, regulation, and control of corporations;
(b) corporations formed under the law of a State (except any corporation formed solely for religious, charitable, scientific or artistic purposes, and not for the acquisition of gain by the corporation or its members), including their dissolution, regulation, and control; and
(c) foreign corporations, including their regulation and control:

...
(xxxv.) ~~Conciliation and arbitration for the prevention and settlement of industrial disputes extending beyond the limits of any one State:~~

Labour and employment, including

(a) the wages and conditions of labour and employment in any trade industry or calling; and
(b) the prevention and settlement of industrial disputes, including disputes in relation to employment on or about railways the property of any State':

...
(xl.) Combinations and monopolies in relation to the production, manufacture, or supply of goods or services.

== Results ==
The referendum was not approved by a majority of voters, and a majority of the voters was achieved in only one state, Western Australia. (Note: Handbook of the 44th Parliament (2014) "Part 5 - Referendums and Plebiscites - Referendum results". Parliamentary Library of Australia.)

Result
State	Electoral roll	Ballots issued	For		Against		Informal
State	Electoral roll	Ballots issued	Vote	%	Vote	%	Informal
New South Wales	868,194	384,188	135,968	36.11	240,605	63.89	7,396
Victoria	723,377	448,566	170,288	38.64	270,390	61.36	7,554
Queensland	293,003	162,135	69,552	43.75	89,420	56.25	3,002
South Australia	216,027	133,802	50,358	38.07	81,904	61.93	1,374
Western Australia	138,697	61,482	33,043	54.86	27,185	45.14	870
Tasmania	102,326	58,053	24,147	42.11	33,200	57.89	673
Total for Commonwealth	2,341,624	1,248,226	483,356	39.42	742,704	60.58	20,869
Results	Obtained majority in one state and an overall minority of 259,348 votes. Not carried.						

== Discussion ==
This was the first of many times that similar questions were asked at a referendum. On every occasion the public decided not to vest power in the Commonwealth over these matters.

- 1913 referendum on trade and commerce
- 1919 referendum on trade and commerce, corporations, industrial matters and trusts.
- 1926 referendum on Industry and Commerce.

== See also ==
- Huddart, Parker & Co Pty Ltd v Moorehead
- Referendums in Australia
- Politics of Australia
- History of Australia
